= Liuyang Two-oriented Industrial Park =

Industrial park in Liuyang, China

Liuyang Two-oriented Industrial Park (Chinese: 浏阳两型产业园) is an agricultural products processing industrial park at province level in Liuyang City, Hunan Province, China. It is the 3rd largest one of Liuyang by economic size, after the Liuyang ETZ and HTZ. The industrial park is the original Modern Agricultural Park (Chinese: 浏阳现代农业园) created in 1999, it was Changed to Agricultural Technology Industrial Park (Chinese: 浏阳农业科技产业园) in 2007 and to the present name in 2012. Functionally, it is a demonstration area of two - oriented society, food industrial cluster, new industries demonstration area, new urban area of ecological and suitable residence.

As of 2015, there are 50 registered enterprises, it has a builtup area of roughly 3 km^{2} (1.2 sq mi), it has completed the cumulative construction investment of CNY 12,600 million (rough USD 1,938 million) since its establishment. The industrial park is located at the intersection of Gugang and Yanxi towns, it covers an area of 21.55 square kilometres (8.32 sq mi). As of 2015, its gross output value of industries is CNY 7,600 million (US$ 1,220 million), the financial revenue reaches CNY 118 million (US$ 19 million).
