= Jiaoxi =

Jiaoxi may refer to the following places:

- Jiaoxi Commandery, a historical commandery of China
- Jiaoxi, Liuyang, a township in Liuyang, Hunan, China
- Jiaoxi, Yilan, a township in northern Yilan County, Taiwan
