= Dahu, Liuyang =

Dahu Town 达浒镇
- Town
- Location in Hunan
- Coordinates: 28°25′17″N 113°55′09″E
- Country: People's Republic of China
- Province: Hunan
- Prefecture-level city: Changsha
- County-level city: Liuyang

Area
  - Total: 185.6 km^{2} (71.7 sq mi)

Population (2015)
  - Total: 27,100
  - Density: 146/km^{2} (378/sq mi)
- Time zone: UTC+8 (China Standard)
- Postal code: 410305
- Area code: 0731

Dahu Town (simplified Chinese: 达浒镇; traditional Chinese: 達滸鎮; pinyin: Dáhǔ Zhèn) is a rural town in Liuyang City, Hunan Province, People's Republic of China. According to the 2015 census, it had a population of 27,100 and an area of 185.6 square kilometres (71.7 sq mi). The town is bordered to the north by Pingjiang County, to the east by Daweishan Town, to the south by Guandu Town, and to the west by Yanxi Town

== Administrative divisions ==
The town is divided into four villages and two communities:

- Mazhou Community (麻洲社区)
- Changyi Community (达浒社区)
- Jintian Village (金田村)
- Xiangxing Village (象形村)
- Shuxiang Village (书香村)
- Shuhuaxin Village (淑花新村)

== Geography ==
The Daxi River (大溪河) flows through the town.

Banbei Reservoir (板贝水库) is the largest reservoir and largest water body in the town.

There are a number of popular mountains located immediately adjacent to the townsite which include Mount Liuyang'ao (浏阳坳, 947.5 metres (3,109 ft)); Mount Lianyun (连云山, 1,600.4 metres (5,251 ft)); Mount Huozi'ao (火子坳, 955.5 metres (3,135 ft)); and Mount Wangpojian (王婆尖, 951 metres (3,120 ft)).

== Economy ==
The town's main industries are agriculture, mining and fireworks.

== Education ==
- Dahu Middle School

== Transportation ==
The County Road X002 passes across the town west to east.

== Religion ==
The Catholic Church (天主堂) is a church in the town.

The Arhat Temple (罗汉寺) is a Buddhist temple in the town.

The Ancestral Temple of Kong Family (孔氏家庙) is a famous scenic spot, it was originally built in 1586, during the Ming dynasty (1368–1644).

== Attractions ==
The Xiangxing Scenic Spot (象形风景区) is an AAA-level tourist attraction in the town.
