= Liuyang =

Liuyang 浏阳市
- County-level city
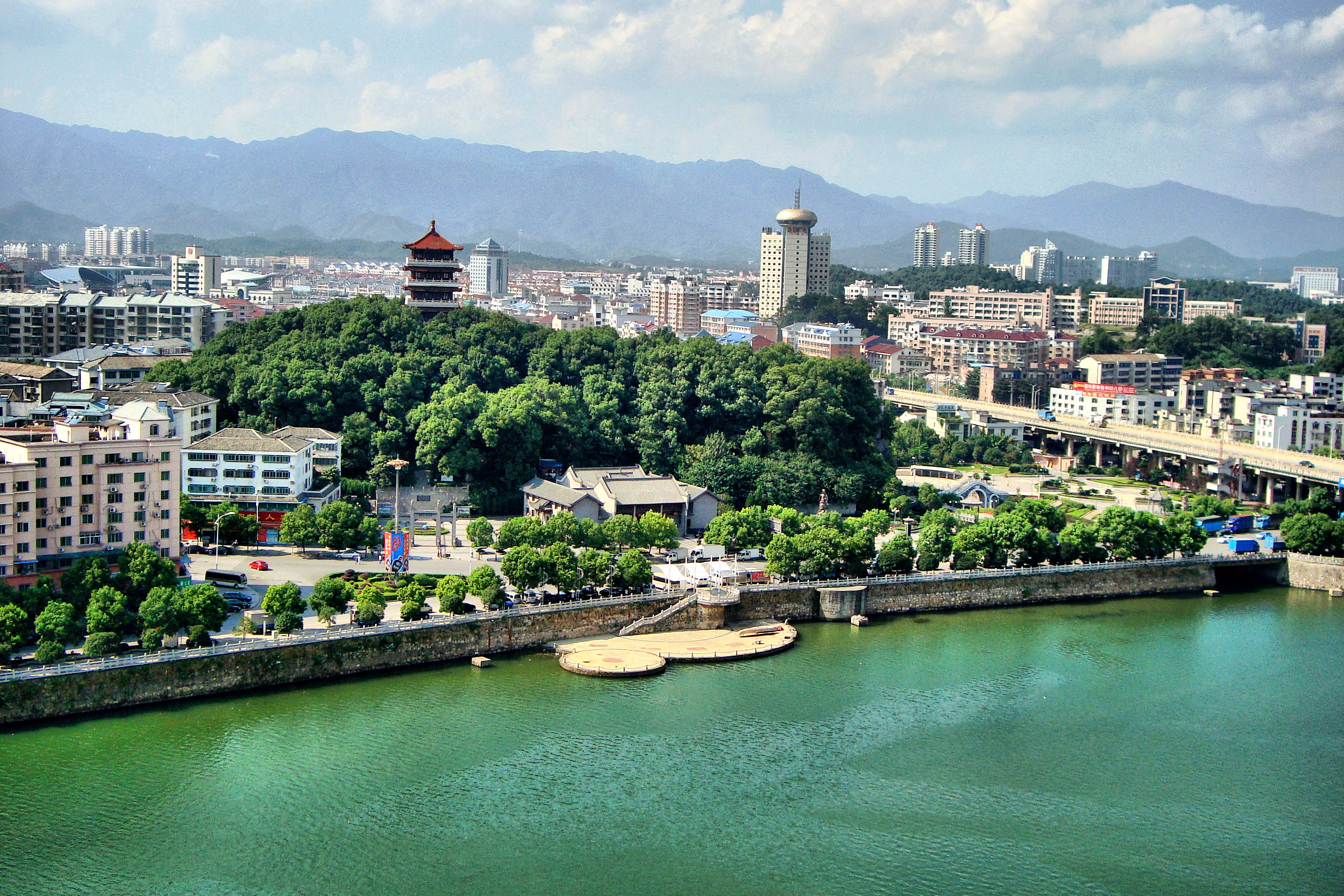

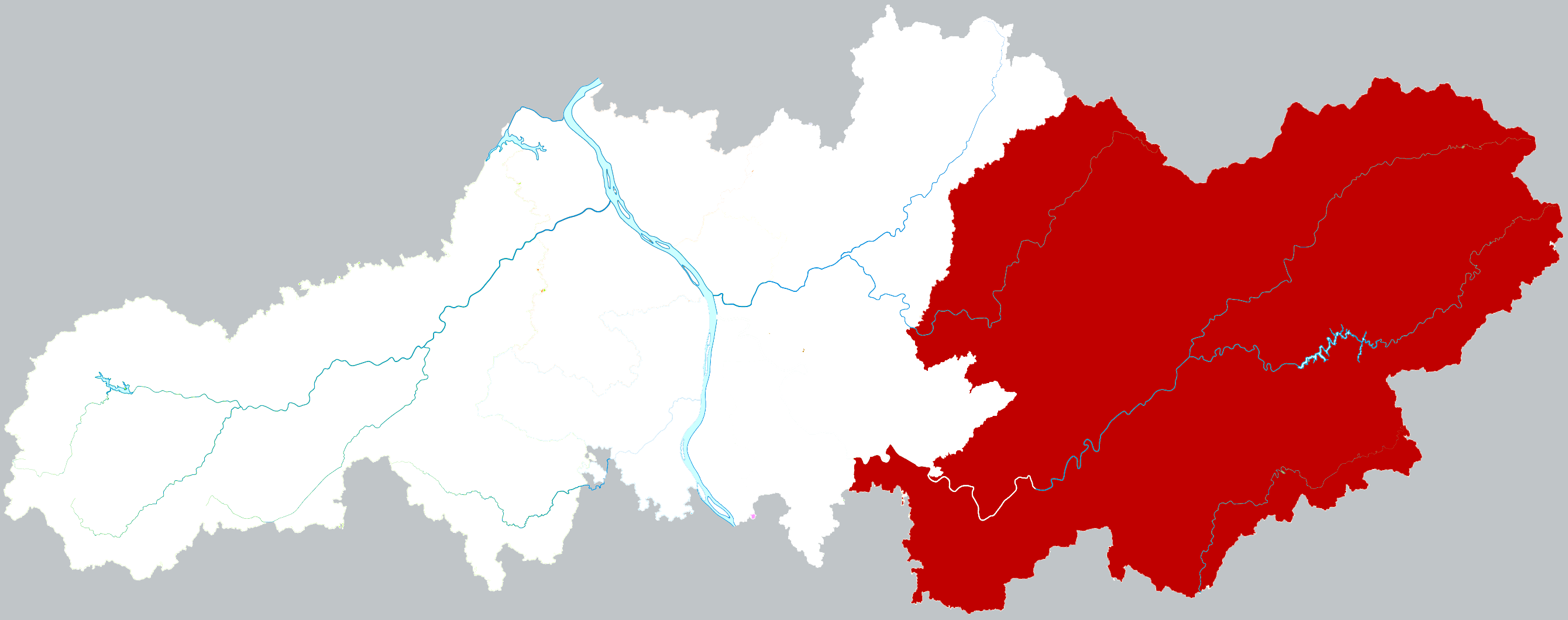
- Location of Liuyang City within Changsha

- Location of downtown in Hunan
- Coordinates (Liuyang government): 28°10′2″N 113°38′16″E
- Country: People's Republic of China
- Province: Hunan
- Prefecture-level city: Changsha
- Seat: Guankou

Area
  - County-level city: 5,008 km^{2} (1,934 sq mi)
  - Urban: 27.90 km^{2} (10.77 sq mi)

Population (2010)
  - County-level city: 1,278,928
  - Estimate (2017): 1,515,000
  - Density: 255.4/km^{2} (661.4/sq mi)
  - Urban: 260,000
- Time zone: UTC+8 (China Standard)
- Postal code: 410312
- Area code: 0731
- Website: liuyang.gov.cn

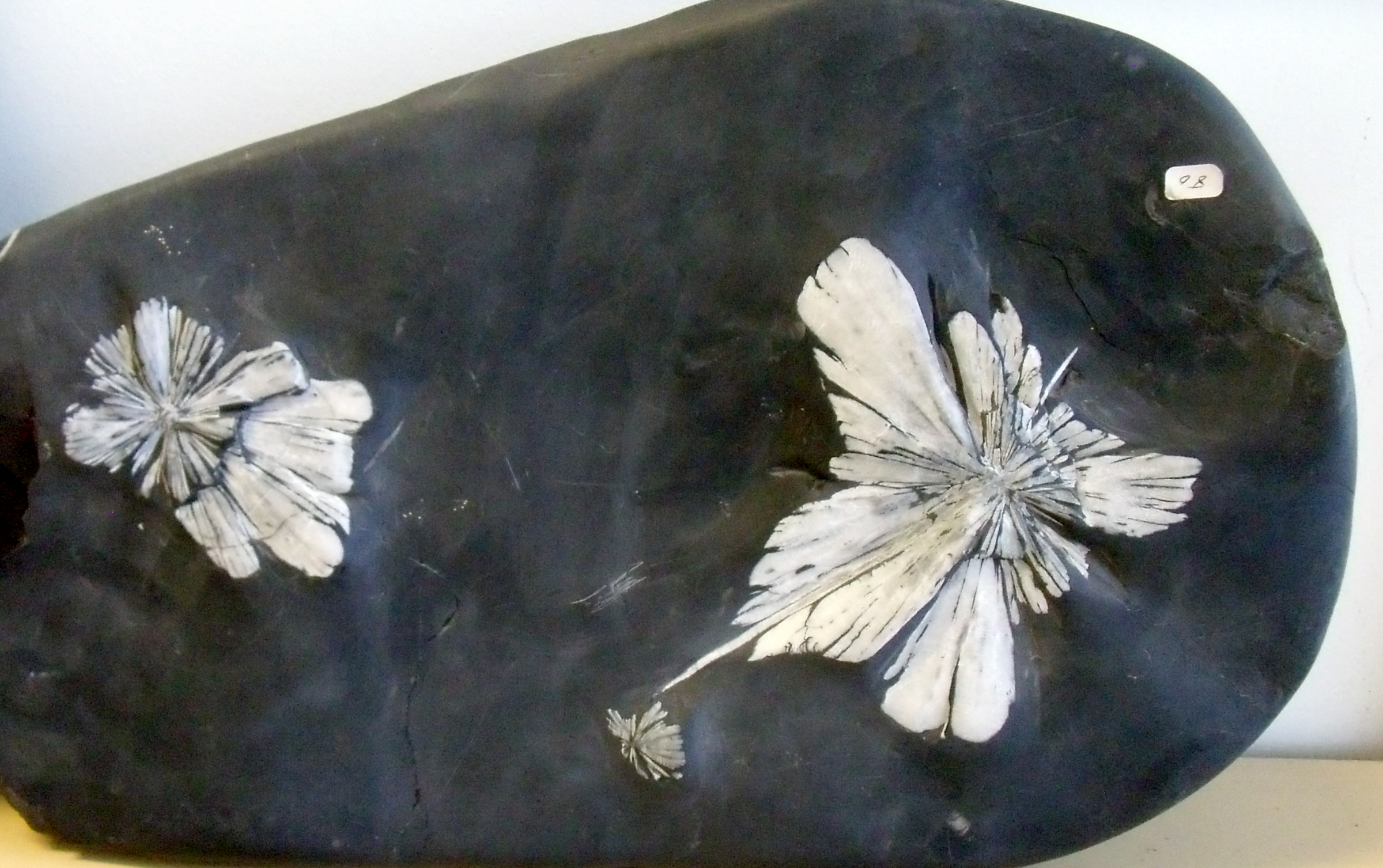
Chrysanthemum Stone (celestine in limestone) from Liuyang

Liuyang (simplified Chinese: 浏阳; traditional Chinese: 瀏陽; pinyin: Liúyáng) is a county-level city, the most populous and the easternmost county-level division of Hunan Province, China. It is under the administration of the prefecture-level city of Changsha, the provincial capital. Located on the northeastern margin of Hunan, the city is bordered to the north by Pingjiang County, to the west by Changsha County and Yuhua District, to the south by Shifeng, Hetang Districts of Zhuzhou and Liling City, to the southeast and the east by Yuanzhou District of Yichun, Shangli, Wanzai and Tonggu Counties of Jiangxi. Liuyang City covers 4,997.35 km^{2} (1,929.49 sq mi) with registered population of 1,453,246 and resident population of 1,297,700 (as of 2014). The city has four subdistricts, 26 towns and two townships under its jurisdiction. Its administrative centre is at Guankou Subdistrict (关口街道).

Liuyang is home to the Hakka people with a population of more than 200,000, who immigrated here from Meizhou of Guangdong or Jiangxi in later Ming and early Qing dynasties. It is one of the richest counties and county-level cities in tourism resources. As it was a revolutionary base area in the Chinese Communist Revolution, there are many red tourism attractions and former residences of famous figures.

Liuyang is one of the most developed counties and county-level cities. It is one of the best developed manufacturing counties and county-level cities in the province, with the manufacturing industry serving as its economic pillar. Liuyang's manufacturing engines are electronics and information, biomedicine, machinery manufacturing, fireworks and firecrackers, food and beverage, materials and energy, furniture and decoration. Liuyang had a total GDP of CN¥111.28 billion (US$17.87 billion) in 2015, of which the manufacturing industry contributed CN¥71.37 billion (US$11.46 billion), or 64.14% of the city's GDP.

Fireworks and firecrackers originated in Liuyang and it has always been the center of fireworks production in China, spanning more than 1,400 years. Fireworks sales by Liuyang account for about half of China's gross sales of CN¥ 29.41 billion (US$4.34 billion). Liuyang is also home of the International Fireworks Association.

== History ==
According to historical relics discovered in Yong'an Middle School's construction site in 1991, in the Old Stone Age, there were people living in Liuyang. In the eastern Han dynasty (in 209 AD), Liuyang was established as a county, and its government was located in Juling (now the northern Guandu). In the Tang dynasty, the government was moved to Huaichuan (now the Huaichuan Street), and in the Yuan dynasty (in 1295 AD), the government was moved back to Juling, and Liuyang became a "state". In the Ming dynasty (in 1369 AD), Liuyang was degraded as a county, and its government was moved to Huaichuan again. In the eastern Han dynasty, Sun Quan set Liuyang (刘阳). In the Three Kingdoms-Wu, Liuyang belonged to Changsha Prefecture. In the Liu Song period of Southern Dynasties, the name was changed from Liuyang (刘阳) to Liuyang (浏阳), and the new name is used until now. In the Sui dynasty, Liuyang was merged into Changsha, and in the Tang dynasty (in 708 AD) Liuyang was established as a county again. In the Sui dynasty and the Tang dynasty, Liuyang belonged to Tanzhou. In the Ming dynasty and the Qing dynasty, Liuyang belonged to Changsha. In the 26th reign year of the Republic of China (in 1937 AD), Liuyang belonged to the First District, Hunan Province Chief Inspector's Office. In 1949, the First District, Hunan Province Chief Inspector's Office, was renamed as Changsha prefecture. In 1952, Changsha prefecture was replaced by Xiangtan prefecture, and Liuyang belonged to Xiangtan prefecture (later, it was called Xiangtan area). In February 1983, Xiangtan area was cancelled, and Liuyang was attributed to Changsha city. On 16 January 1993, Liuyang was not a county any more, and it becomes a county-level city, called Liuyang city. In September 1927 Mao Zedong assembled Left-Kuomintang troops here, in the town of Wenjiashi (文家市) on the Jiangxi border, for the Com-Intern-planned seizure of Changsha, the provincial capital, 100 km to the west. Mao led the troops 170 km south into the Jinggang Mountains. Half a year later, he was joined there by the troops of Zhu De.

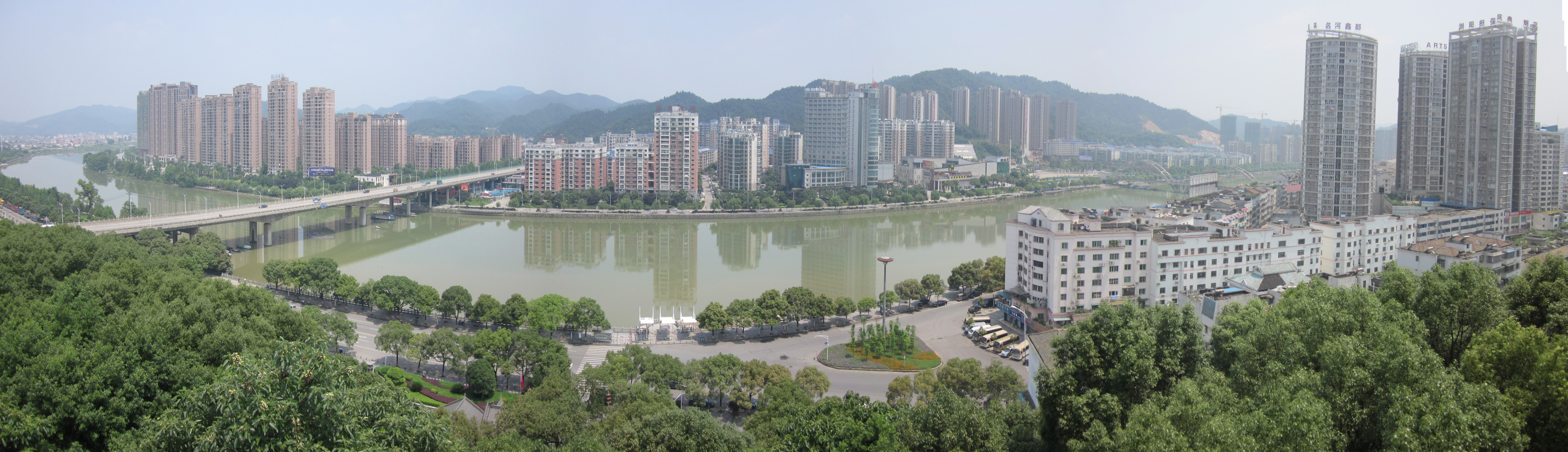
A panoramic view of Liuyang in 2014.

== Administrative divisions ==
After an adjustment of township-level administrative divisions of Liuyang on 18 November 2015 and the Gejia Township was reformed as a town in the same year, Jiaoxi Township also was reformed in 2018. As of 2020, Liuyang City has four subdistricts, 27 towns and one township under its jurisdiction. They are:

1 township

- Xiaohe (小河乡)

27 towns

- Baijia (柏加镇)
- Beisheng (北盛镇)
- Chengchong (枨冲镇)
- Chengtanjiang (澄潭江镇)
- Chunkou (淳口镇)
- Dahu (达浒镇)
- Daweishan (大围山镇)
- Dayao (大瑶镇)
- Dongyang (洞阳镇)
- Gaoping (高坪镇)
- Gejia (葛家镇)
- Guandu (官渡镇)
- Guanqiao (官桥镇)
- Gugang (古港镇)
- Jingang (金刚镇)
- Longfu (龙伏镇)
- Puji (普迹镇)
- Shashi (沙市镇)
- Shegang (社港镇)
- Wenjiashi (文家市镇)
- Yanxi (沿溪镇)
- Yong'an (永安镇)
- Yonghe (永和镇)
- Zhangfang (张坊镇)
- Zhentou (镇头镇)
- Zhonghe (中和镇)
- Jiaoxi (蕉溪镇)

4 subdistricts

- Guankou (关口街道)
- Hehua (荷花街道)
- Huaichuan (淮川街道)
- Jili (集里街道)

== Geography ==
Liuyang is located in the northeast of Hunan province, and it is in the upstream regions of the Liuyang River. Liuyang covers an area of 5,007.75 square kilometers. There are 105.8 kilometers from east to west and 80.9 kilometers from north to south. Liuyang is surrounded by mountains and hills. There are 53% mountain lands, 25% hills, 21% plains around hills and 1% water in Liuyang. The terrain of Liuyang is that north-east is higher than south-west, and landscape types change because of a lot of rivers. Liuyang is in a subtropical monsoon climate zone. Annual average temperature is 17.3 °C, and annual precipitation is 1562 mm. There are two national roads, G106 and G319. Besides, there are three main rivers, Liuyang River, Laodao River and Nanchuan River, which can be used as shipping lanes throughout the whole year. Liuyang lies in the south of Pingjiang county, Yueyang city, and in the east of Tonggu, Wanzai, Yichun and Shangli, Jiangxi province, and in the north of Liling and Zhuzhou City, and in the east of Changsha county. Liuyang is about 50 kilometers far from Changsha city.

=== Climate ===
Climate data for Liuyang, elevation 101 m (331 ft), (1991–2020 normals, extremes 1981–present)
Month	Jan	Feb	Mar	Apr	May	Jun	Jul	Aug	Sep	Oct	Nov	Dec	Year
Record high °C (°F)	24.6 (76.3)	28.8 (83.8)	33.4 (92.1)	34.8 (94.6)	36.4 (97.5)	37.4 (99.3)	40.2 (104.4)	40.5 (104.9)	38.4 (101.1)	35.4 (95.7)	31.9 (89.4)	25.1 (77.2)	40.5 (104.9)
Mean daily maximum °C (°F)	9.8 (49.6)	12.7 (54.9)	16.7 (62.1)	23.1 (73.6)	27.6 (81.7)	30.4 (86.7)	33.8 (92.8)	33.5 (92.3)	29.9 (85.8)	24.7 (76.5)	18.8 (65.8)	12.8 (55.0)	22.8 (73.1)
Daily mean °C (°F)	5.7 (42.3)	8.2 (46.8)	12.0 (53.6)	17.8 (64.0)	22.4 (72.3)	25.8 (78.4)	28.7 (83.7)	28.1 (82.6)	24.5 (76.1)	19.1 (66.4)	13.1 (55.6)	7.7 (45.9)	17.8 (64.0)
Mean daily minimum °C (°F)	2.9 (37.2)	5.0 (41.0)	8.6 (47.5)	14.0 (57.2)	18.6 (65.5)	22.3 (72.1)	24.6 (76.3)	24.3 (75.7)	20.7 (69.3)	15.1 (59.2)	9.3 (48.7)	4.2 (39.6)	14.1 (57.4)
Record low °C (°F)	−6.2 (20.8)	−5.2 (22.6)	−3.6 (25.5)	1.2 (34.2)	8.7 (47.7)	13.7 (56.7)	17.6 (63.7)	18.5 (65.3)	12.5 (54.5)	2.2 (36.0)	−2.3 (27.9)	−10.7 (12.7)	−10.7 (12.7)
Average precipitation mm (inches)	80.2 (3.16)	95.9 (3.78)	175.7 (6.92)	186.5 (7.34)	221.2 (8.71)	264.1 (10.40)	178.9 (7.04)	120.8 (4.76)	78.5 (3.09)	56.3 (2.22)	82.3 (3.24)	56.9 (2.24)	1,597.3 (62.9)
Average precipitation days (≥ 0.1 mm)	14.4	13.6	18.2	17.3	16.4	16.2	11.8	11.8	9.2	8.8	10.1	10.8	158.6
Average snowy days	2.9	1.9	0.4	0	0	0	0	0	0	0	0.1	1.0	6.3
Average relative humidity (%)	83	82	83	81	81	83	78	79	79	79	81	80	81
Mean monthly sunshine hours	65.2	69.6	82.1	110.7	137.3	139.0	221.9	211.8	171.4	145.7	119.7	105.5	1,579.9
Percentage possible sunshine	20	22	22	29	33	33	52	52	47	41	37	33	35
Source: China Meteorological Administration

== Population ==
According to the sixth population census in 2010, the number of permanent resident population of Liuyang is 1,278,928, and the number of registered population is 1,407,104. In registered population, the agricultural population is 1, 252, 238, and the nonagricultural population is 154, 866. Natural population growth rate is 2.5 ‰. There are more than 300,000 Hakka whose ancestors moved from Meizhou of Guangdong to Liuyang.

== Language ==
Traditionally, there are three dialect areas in Liuyang, Gan Dialect, new Xiang Dialect and Hakka. Gan Dialect is Jiangxi Dialect, and it is used in downtown, northern Liuyang, eastern Liuyang and southern Liuyang. This is the most popular dialect in Liuyang, and people may call it Liuyang Dialect. Besides, new Xiang Dialect is used in western Liuyang, like Puji, Zhentou, Baijia, Guanqiao, Gejia and Chengchong, and it is also used in some areas in northern Liuyang, like Beisheng and Yong'an. This kind of dialect is not exactly the same as Changsha Dialect, but it is similar to it. As for Hakka, most people living in the east of Liuyang use this, and it is almost the same as Hakka in Meizhou area.

== Economy ==
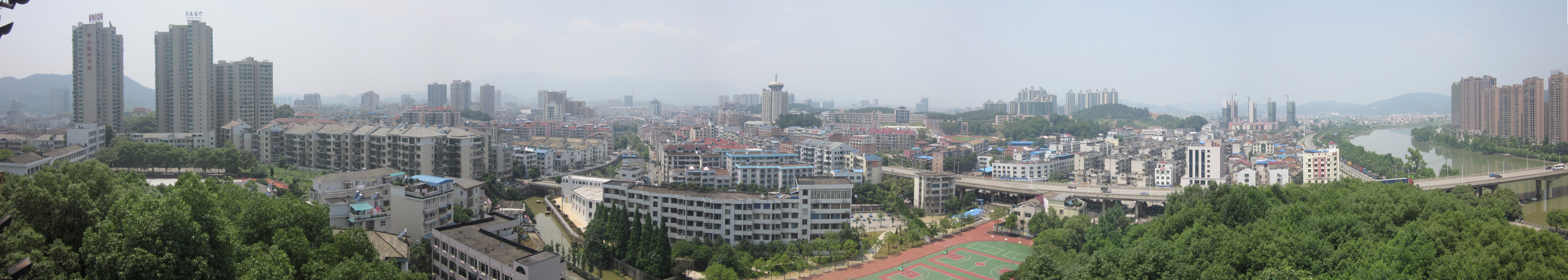
A panoramic view of Liuyang in 2014.

Liuyang is one of the most developed counties in Hunan, it ranked the 11th in the Top100 of counties and county-level cities of China by comprehensive strength in 2020. According to preliminary accounting of the statistical authority, the gross domestic product of Liuyang City in 2017 was 136,510 million yuan (20,218 million US dollars), up by 10.8 percent over the previous year. Of this total, the value added of the primary industry was 10,680 million yuan (1,582 million US dollars), up by five percent, that of the secondary industry was 93,940 million yuan (13,913 million US dollars), up by 11 percent and that of the tertiary industry was 31,890 million yuan (4,723 million US dollars), up by 12.3 percent. The value added of the primary industry accounted for 7.82 percent of the GDP; that of the secondary industry accounted for 68.82 percent; and that of the tertiary industry accounted for 23.36 percent. The per capita GDP by year-end household population in 2017 was 92,006 yuan (13,627 US dollars).

Liuyang cultivates food crops, like rice. Main cash crops are flue-cured tobacco, medicinal materials, vegetables, oil-seed camellias, flowers and plants. Liuyang has been mining some natural resources, like sepiolite, chrysanthemum stone, coal and phosphorite. Industries include fireworks production, bio-pharmaceuticals and food processing. Liuyang fireworks have been in the global market for more than 100 years, and they were sold to Hong Kong, Macao and the Southeast Asia in the Guangxu period of the Qing dynasty, and fireworks become an important brand and pillar industry of Liuyang. Liuyang fireworks are protected as an original product and hold the honor of China's famous brand. In 2010, Liuyang's GDP was up to 55.677 billion RMB (8.225 billion dollars). The added value of the primary sector was 5.169 billion RMB (0.764 billion dollars). The added value of the secondary sector was 37.905 billion RMB (5.599 billion dollars). The added value of the tertiary sector was 12.603 billion RMB (1.862 billion dollars). The total value of out-put of Agriculture Animal Husbandry and Fishery was 8.006 billion RMB (1.183 billion dollars). In agriculture, except for grain production, the annual output of flue-cured tobacco was 131,670,000 tons. Liuyang's total industrial output value was 90.289 billion RMB (13.338 billion dollars). There are 89 cooperates with a more than 100,000,000 RMB turnover. Total sales of fireworks industry is 12.43 billion RMB (1.84 billion dollars), and the revenue of fireworks industry is 0.97 billion RMB. The total industrial output value of Liuyang Biomedical Park is 17.082 billion RMB (2.523 billion dollars). The volume of export goods is 0.39 billion dollars. Liuyang's general financial revenue is 3.324 billion RMB, including 29% fireworks' revenue. The per-capita disposable income of rural residents is 10,747 RMB (1,588 dollars), and the per-capita disposable income of city dwellers is 21,258 RMB (3,140 dollars).

=== Agriculture ===
Liuyang's main grain crops are rice, and Liuyang is one of the top counties for food production in Hunan province. Main cash crops are flue-cured tobacco, vegetables, flowers and plants, and oil-seed camellias. Production of fruits, corns, bamboo shoots, phyllostachys pubescens, and medicinal materials also has a certain scale. In fish breeding and poultry feeding, except for traditional pigs raising, black goats and bees' raising are also competitive to some extent. Liuyang enjoys the honor as a city of flowers and plants' cultivation in China, and it is famous for Hongzhimu (a kind of plants). In regional distribution of agricultural industry, eastern Liuyang focus on fruits, and western Liuyang focus on flowers and plants, and northern Liuyang focus on tobacco, and these contribute to a grain, vegetables, flue-cured tobacco, flowers and plants-oriented agricultural economy. Liuyang is one of the top 100 counties that have advantages in grain production, and it is a big city for raising pigs and black goats. Vegetable production in Liuyang is up to 304,239 tons, and it is in the second place in Hunan province. The meat output is 80,450 tons, and it is in the 21st place in China. Liuyang runs scale operation, and the quantity of black goats is more than 700 thousand.

=== Fireworks industry ===
Liuyang fireworks have a history of more than 1,400 years. During the Northern Song dynasty, Liuyang fireworks prospered greatly. During the Qing dynasty (in 1723), Liuyang fireworks served as tribute. Since 1875, Liuyang fireworks have been exported to Japan, Korea, India, Iran, the UK, United States, Russia, etc. In the 1990s, Liuyang's fireworks were the area's biggest export. However, in 1998, Liuyang fireworks went through a bottleneck period because of technological deficiencies. Since 1998, Liuyang has been reforming its industry. It is currently undergoing industrial consolidation and the upgrading of technology. Liuyang sets a ban on more than 10 thousand illegal factories, and Liuyang sets a standard to ensure the safety of fireworks production. Liuyang cooperates with some institutions of higher education and research institutes to invent fireworks with better technology and safety. On 8 August 2001, Liuyang fireworks went public in Shanghai. In 2003, Liuyang succeeded in getting a fireworks display project in Brazil. Liuyang has invested more than one million dollars to buy lands in Brazil to build fireworks factories. There are more than 30 fireworks companies in Liuyang.

=== Industrial districts ===
Liuyang has three main industrial districts of Economic and Technological Development Zone, High-Tech Industrial Development Zone and Two-oriented Industrial Park, the economy of its three industrial districts occupies a large proportion of the city. As of 2015, the gross output value of industries in the city reaches CNY 236.66 billion (US$38.00 billion), that of the total in three industrial districts is CNY 123.57 billion (US$19.84 billion). The total financial revenue of Liuyang reaches 11.19 billion yuan (US$1.80 billion), that of the three industrial districts has 4.16 billion yuan (US$0.67 billion), accounting for 37.19% of the total.

=== Biopharmaceutical industry ===
Liuyang Economic and Technological Development Zone is a national biological industry base created on 10 January 1998, located in Dongyang Town. Its pillar industry comprises biological pharmacy, Information technology and Health food. As of 2015, It has more than 700 registered enterprises. The total industrial output value of the zone hits 85.6 billion yuan (US$13.7 billion) and its business income is 100.2 billion yuan (US$16.1 billion). Its builtup area covers 16.5 km^{2} (6.4 sq mi).

== Natural resources and special local products ==
The Daweishan Nature Reserve is home to the red-billed leiothrix and many other species. The Liuyang area is abundant in mineral deposits such as coal, tungsten, sulphur, phosphorus, and barite. There are four main special local products of Liuyang, glycinemax, grass cloth, chrysanthemum stone and fireworks.

== Culture and tourism ==
In 2010, Liuyang attracted 5.7 million tourists which brought an income of 3.5 billion RMB. Since Liuyang was established as a county in the Han dynasty, it is abundant in historical tourist resources. There are two national relic protection units, the Former Residence of Tan Sitong and Site of Joining Forces in Wenjiashi of Autumn Harvest Uprising in Wenjiashi Town. There are eight provincial culture and relics sites, like Xin'an Wind-Rain Bridge that was built in the Ming dynasty and the Liuyang Confucius Temple built in the Song dynasty. There are 13 Changsha city cultural relics' protection units, like the Stone Frost Temple built in the Tang dynasty. There are 17 county cultural relics' protection units, like Yaotou Mountain site and Luobei Mountain site.

The Ouyang Yuqian Grand Theater, named after Chinese dramatist Ouyang Yuqian, was founded in 2002 and is used for drama, musical and children's theater performances.

Major Buddhist Temples in Liuyang include Wenjin Temple (built in Tang dynasty) and Shishuang Temple. Major Taoist Temples include Yaowang Shengchong Palace. Major tourist destinations include Former Residence of Tan Sitong, Former Residence of Song Renqiong, Former Residence of Wang Zhen, Former Residence of Yang Yong, and Former Residence of Hu Yaobang.

The Liuyang Confucius Temple

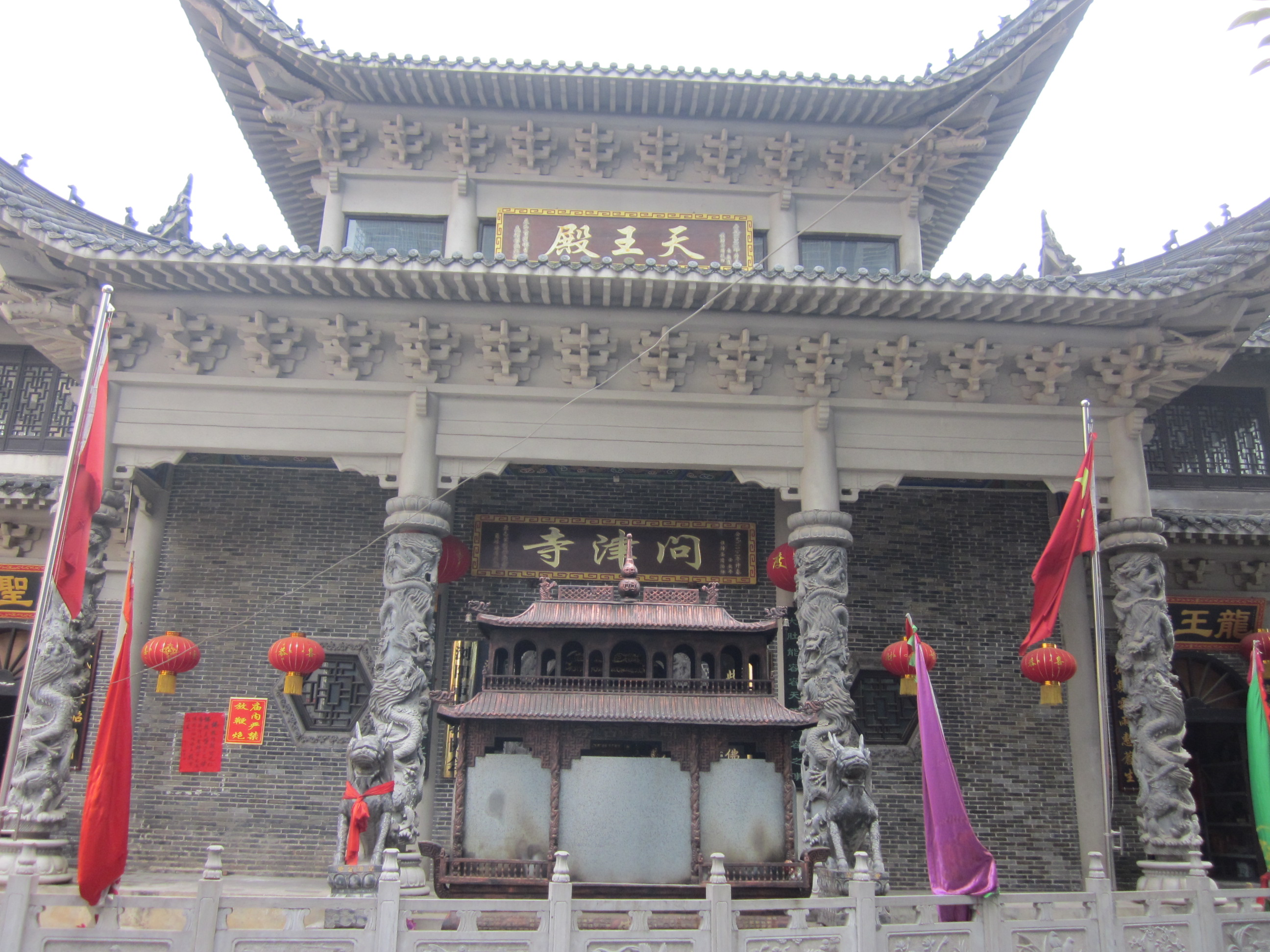
The Wenjin Temple

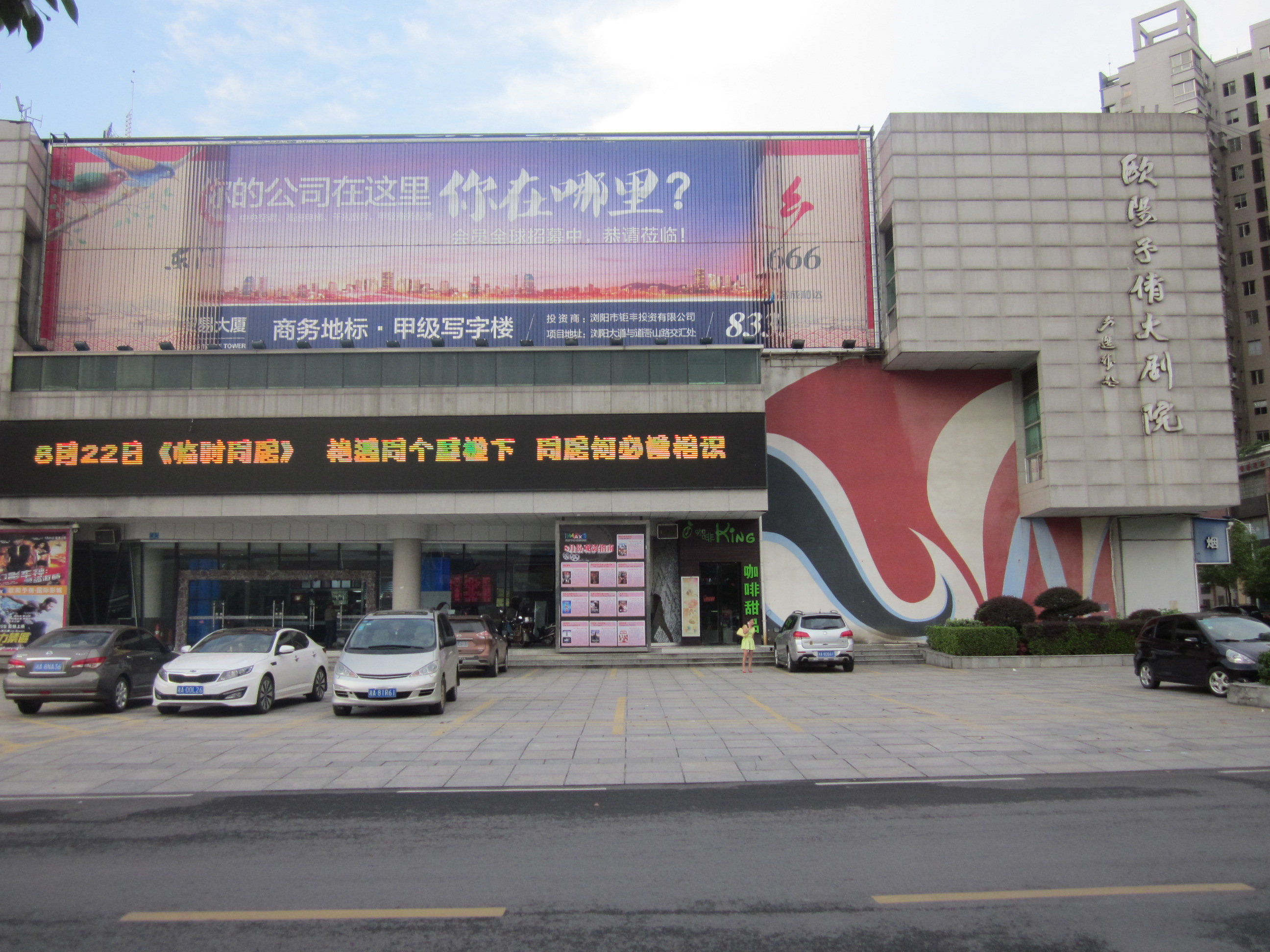
The Ouyang Yuqian Grand Theater

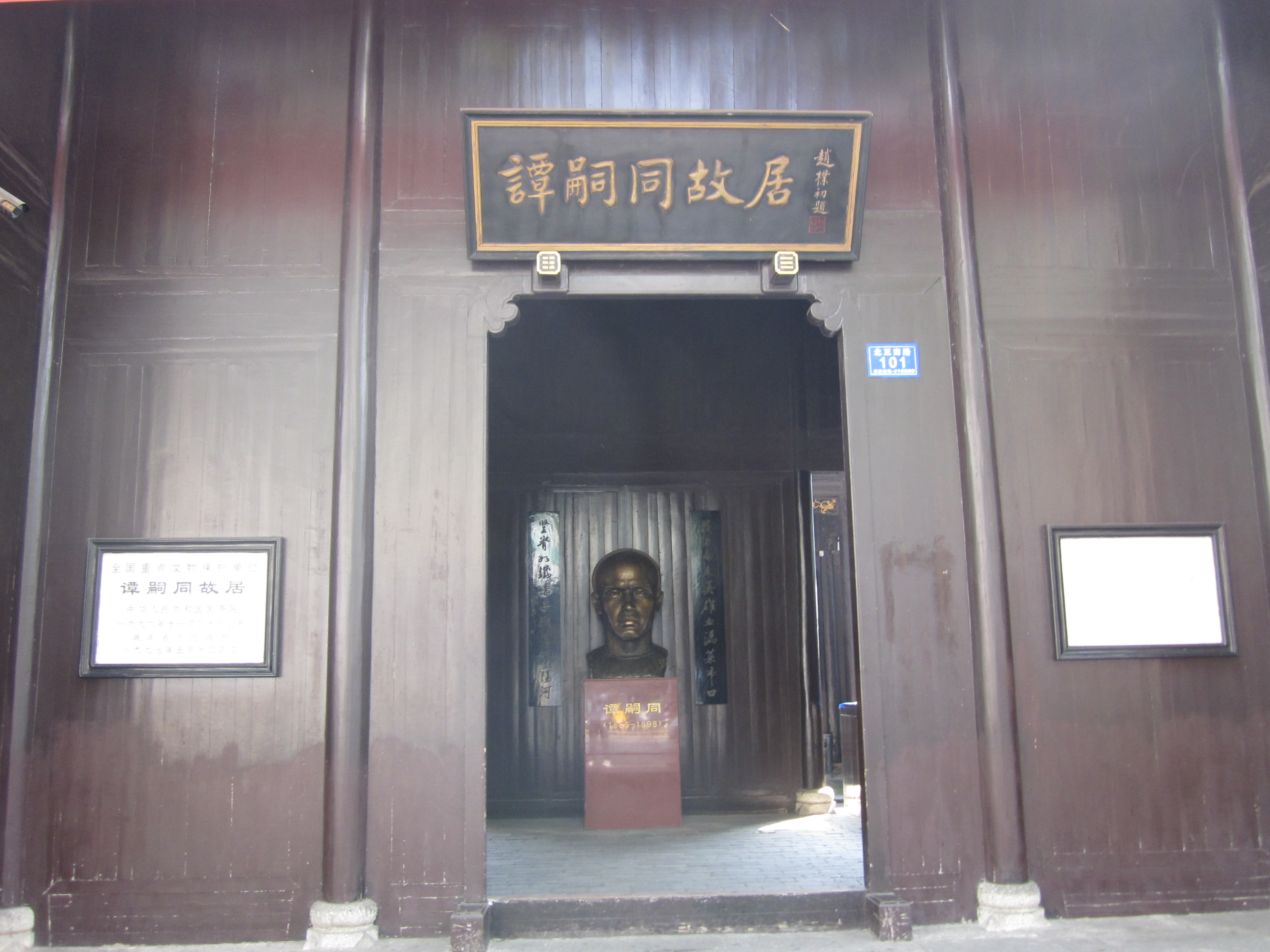
The Former Residence of Tan Sitong

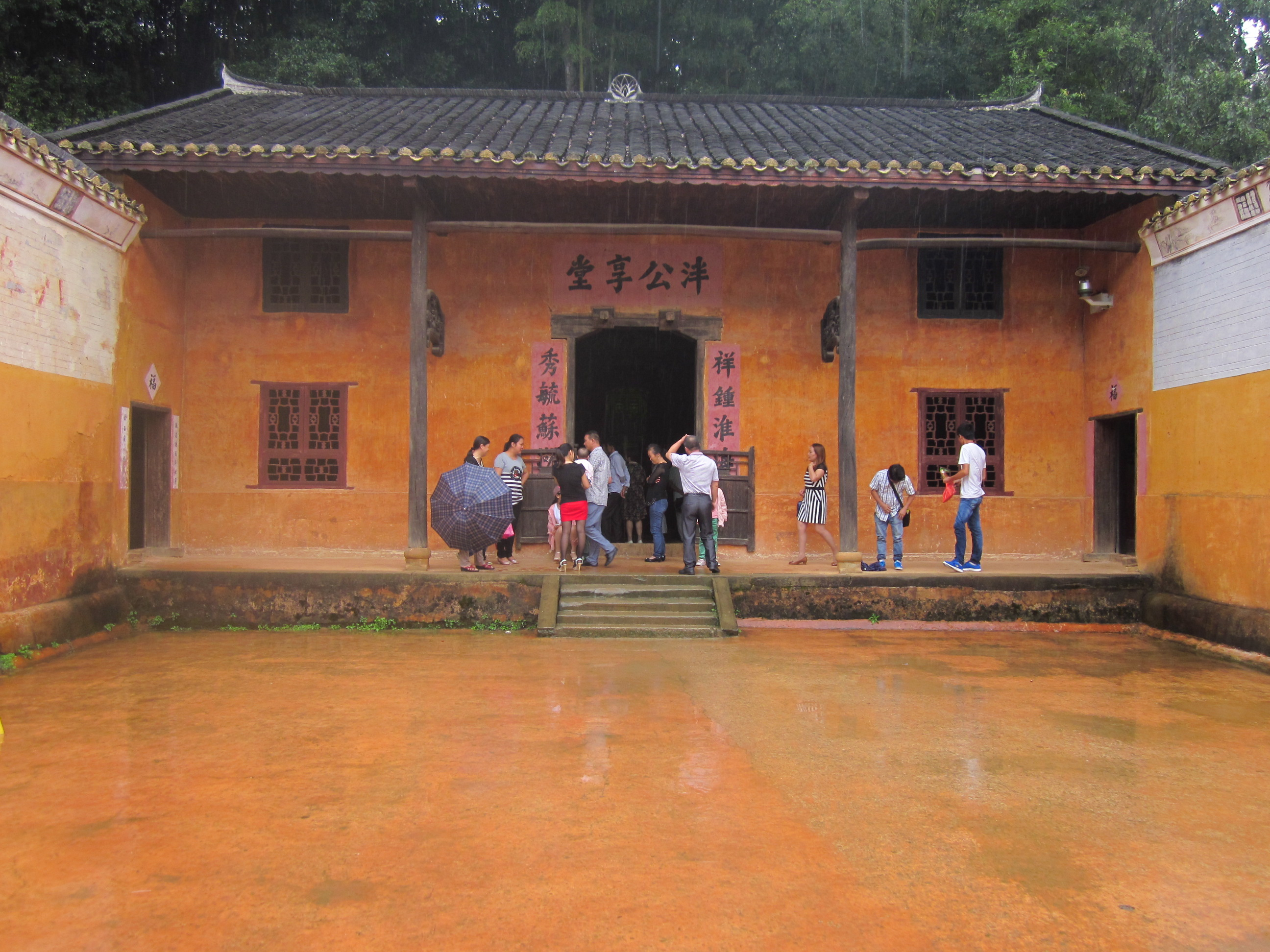
The Former Residence of Hu Yaobang

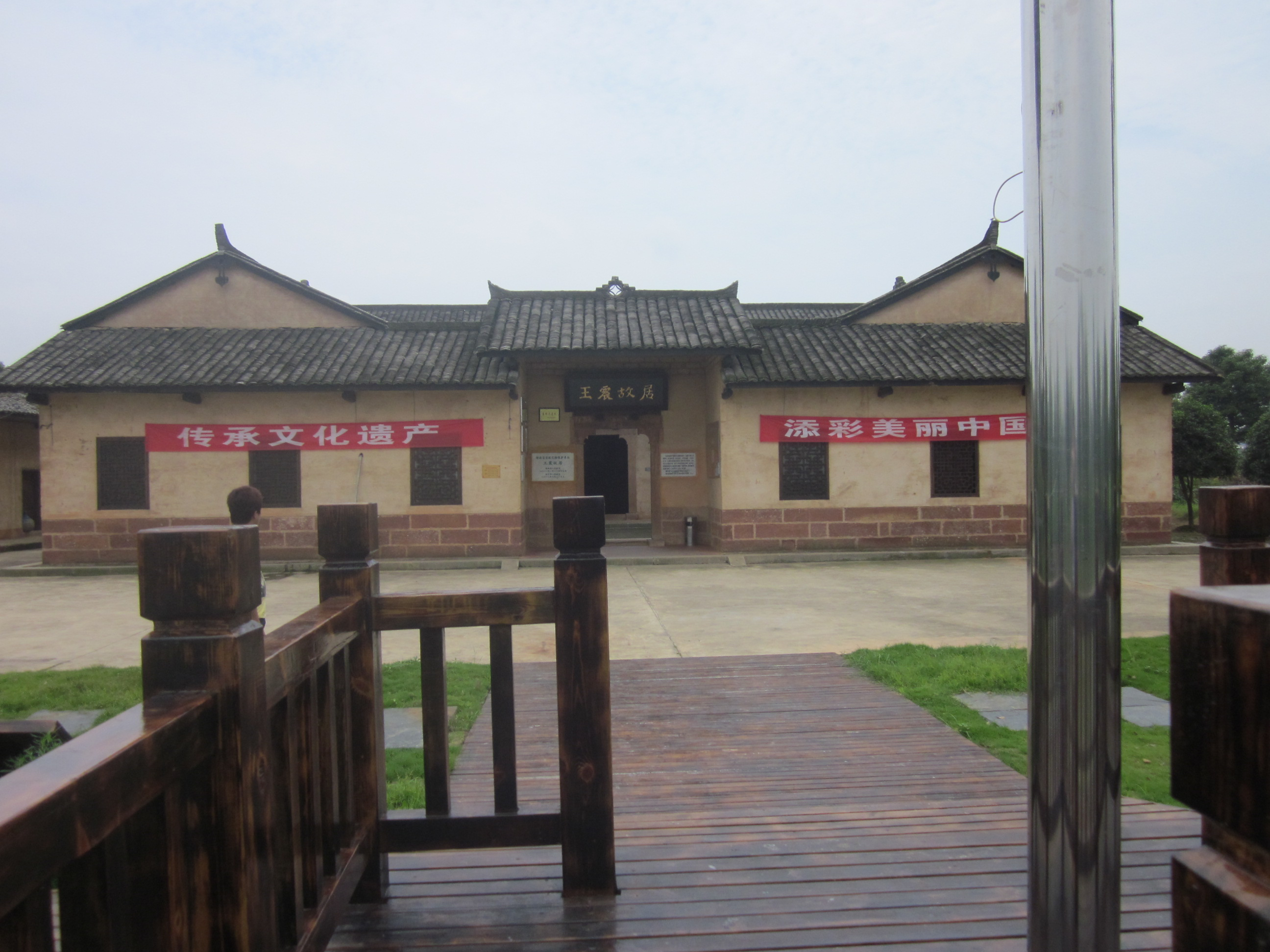
The Former Residence of Wang Zhen

== Transportation ==
=== Rail ===
The Liling–Liuyang railway, more commonly known as "Liliu railway", is a branch from Liling to Yonghe Town of Liuyang, through downtown. It opened on 1 May 1966, in order to provide rail access to Yonghe phosphorus mine and Qibaoshan iron mine. It was closed in 2004, after a serious train crash the previous year.

The Hangzhou–Changsha high-speed railway passes through the southwestern Liuyang's Baijia Town, Zhentou Town and Guanqiao Town.

=== Expressway ===
The G60 Shanghai–Kunming Expressway passes across the southwestern Liuyang's Guanqiao Town.

The Liuyang–Liling Expressway, commonly abbreviated as "Liuli Expressway", is a north–south highway passing through the western city.

The Changsha–Liuyang Expressway, locally known as "Changliu Expressway", is a west–east highway passing through the central Liuyang city.

=== National Highway ===
The National Highway G106, more commonly known as "G106", is a north–south highway traveling through central Liuyang city.

The National Highway G319, commonly abbreviated as "G319", is a west-southeast highway passing through the city's downtown, commercial, and industrial subdistricts.

=== Provincial Highway ===
The Provincial Highway S103, which heads west to Changsha and east to Liuyang, passing through the southwestern part of the city.

The Provincial Highway S309, connecting downtown Liuyang to Paibu Town of Jiangxi.

The Provincial Highway S310 passes through the city's towns of Dayao, Chengtanjiang, Zhonghe and Wenjiashi, leading eastwards to Jiangxi province.

== Notable people ==
- Ouyang Yuqian (欧阳予倩)
- Tan Sitong (谭嗣同)
- Tang Caichang (唐才常)
- Hu Yaobang, general secretary (1980–87) and chairman (1981–82) of the Chinese Communist Party (CCP)
- Liu Chao-shiuan (刘兆玄)
- Wang Zhen, politician and general, who was an uncompromising hard-liner who used his position as vice president (1988–93) of China to promote Maoism
- Song Renqiong, one of the Eight Elders of the Chinese Communist Party
- Yang Yong (杨勇)
- Tang Liang (唐亮)
- Li Zhimin (李志民)
- Li Bai (李白)
- Luo Zhanglong (罗章龙)
- Long Yun (龙云)
- Peng Peiyun (彭佩云)
- Zhou Qifeng (周其凤), President of Peking University
- Zhang Chu (张楚)
