= Hehua, Liuyang =

Hehua Subdistrict 荷花街道
- Subdistrict
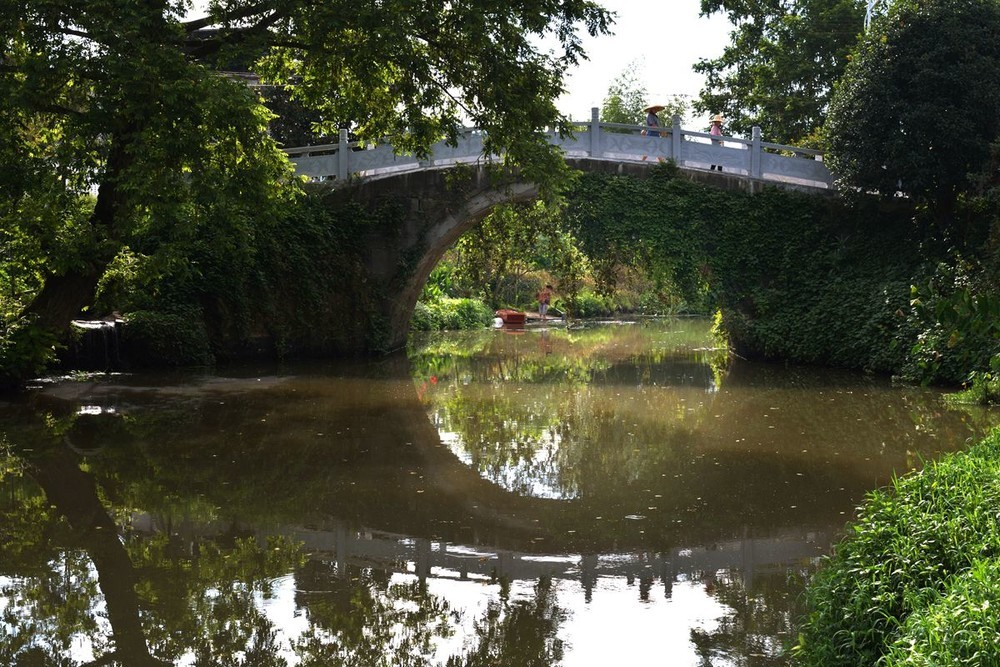
- Nanliu bridge on the Puzigang River, Hehua

- Location in Hunan
- Coordinates: 28°07′29″N 113°38′08″E
- Country: People's Republic of China
- Province: Hunan
- Prefecture-level city: Changsha
- County-level city: Liuyang

Area
  - Total: 134 km^{2} (52 sq mi)

Population (2015)
  - Total: 46,700
  - Density: 349/km^{2} (903/sq mi)
- Time zone: UTC+8 (China Standard)
- Postal code: 412033
- Area code: 0731

Hehua Subdistrict (Chinese: 荷花街道; pinyin: Héhuā Jiēdào Literally means "Lotus") is an urban subdistrict in Liuyang City, Hunan Province, People's Republic of China. As of the 2015 census it had a population of 46,700 and an area of 134 square kilometres (52 sq mi). The subdistrict is bordered to the north by Guankou Subdistrict, to the northeast by Gaoping Town, to the southeast by Chengtanjiang Town, to the northwest by Jili Subdistrict, to the southwest by Chengchong Town, and to the south by Dayao Town.

== Administrative divisions ==
The subdistrict is divided into eight villages and three communities, which include the following areas:

- Hehuayuan Community (荷花园社区)
- Tangzhou Community (唐洲社区)
- Nanshi Community (南市社区)
- Yangjianong Village (杨家弄村)
- Niushiling Village (牛石岭村)
- Nanhuan Village (南环村)
- Xihuan Village (西环村)
- Sitong Village (嗣同村)
- Donghuan Village (东环村)
- Liuhe Village (浏河村)
- Jianxin Village (建新村)

== Geography ==
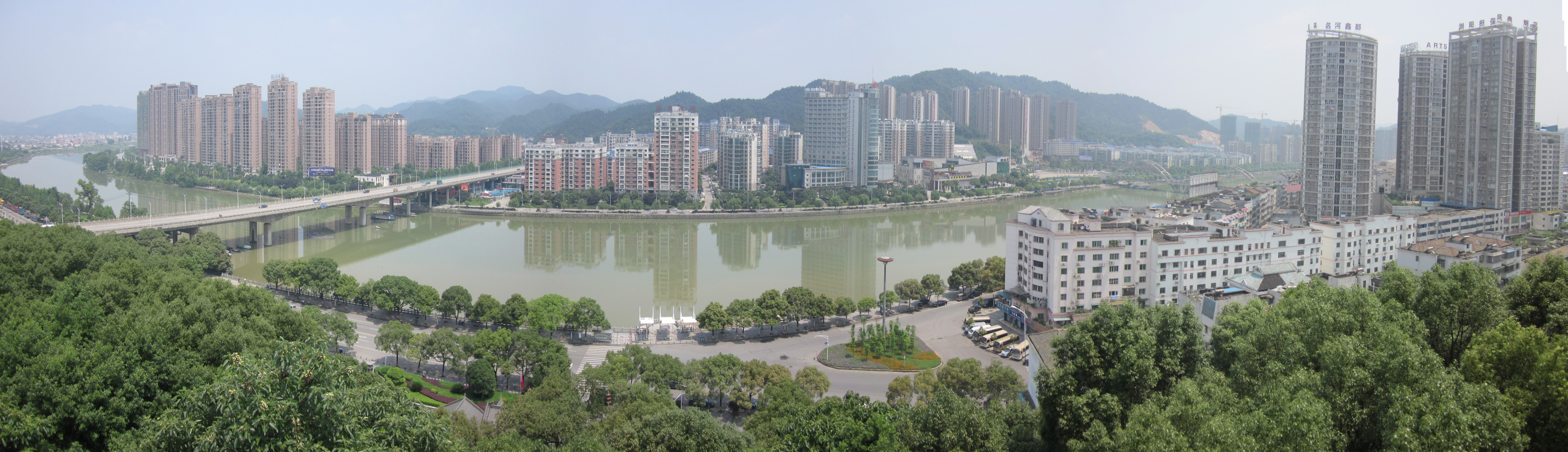
A panoramic view of Liuyang in 2014. The Liuyang River flows through Huaichuan and Hehua Subdistricts of Liuyang city.

Zhangcao Reservoir (漳槽水库) is the largest reservoir and largest water body in the town.

Liuyang River, also known as the mother river, flows through the subdistrict.

== Economy ==
The economy is supported primarily by commerce and aquatic products industry.

== Education ==
- Hehua Middle School
- Jinshalu School (金沙路小学)

== Hospital ==
- Liuyang No. 7 Hospital

== Transportation ==
The South Bus station is situated at the subdistrict.

=== National Highway ===
The subdistrict is connected to two national highways: G319 and G106.

=== Expressway ===
The Changsha–Liuyang Expressway, from Changsha, running northwest to southeast through the subdistrict to Jiangxi.

=== Railway ===
The Liling–Liuyang railway, passes across the subdistrict northwest to southeast. A railway stations is settled: Gujia (古家). This branch was removed in 2004.

== Attractions ==
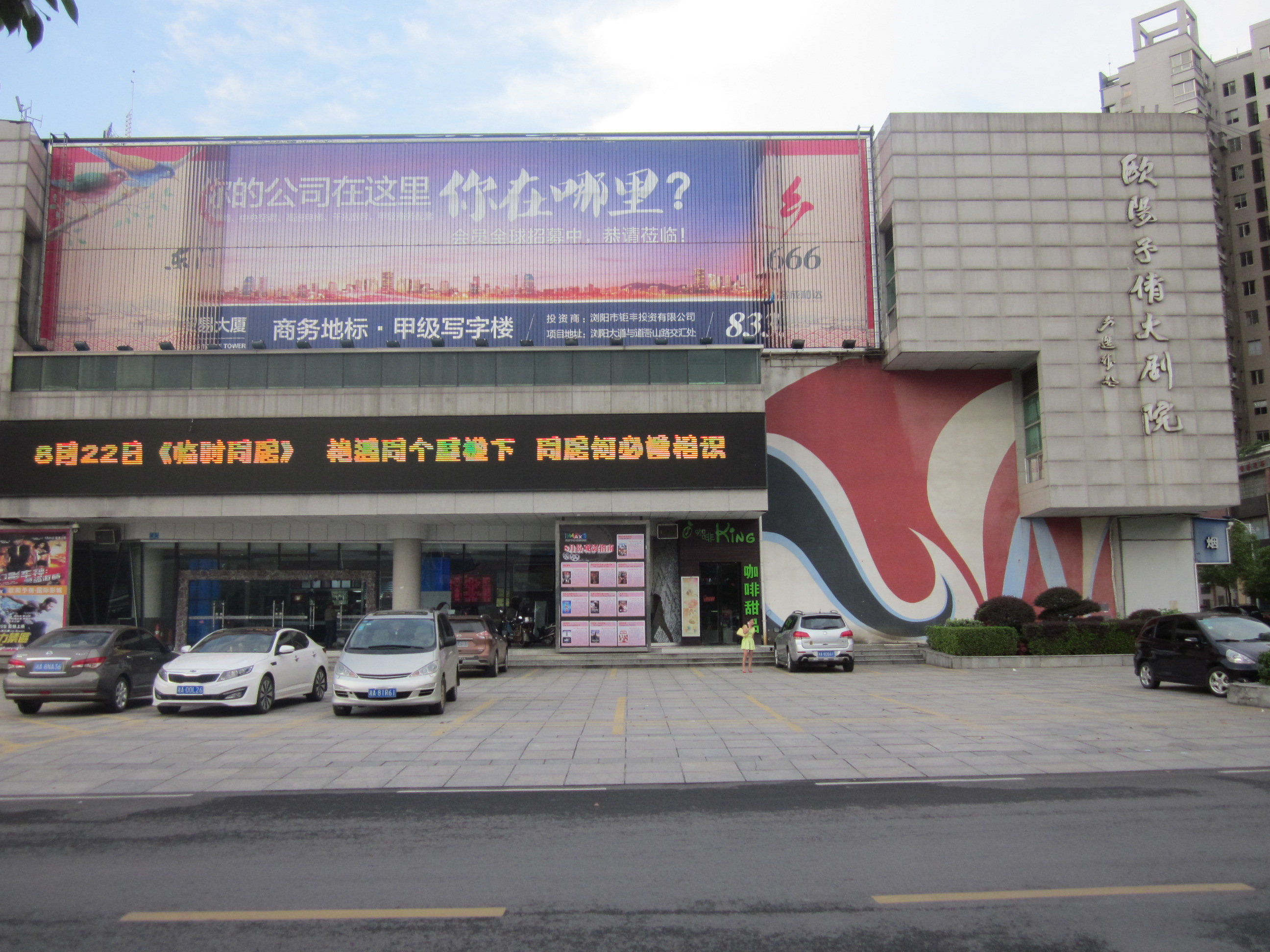
Ouyang Yuqian Grand Theater.

The main attractions are the Tomb of Tan Sitong, Ouyang Yuqian Grand Theater and Ancestral Temple of Ouyang Xuan (欧阳玄祠).

Tianmashan Park or Tianma Mountain Park (天马山公园) is a public and urban park in the subdistrict.

Liuyang River Wetland Park (浏阳河湿地公园) situated at the subdistrict.

== Notable people ==
- Ouyang Xuan (欧阳玄; 1283–1358), scholar.
