= Chrysanthemum stone =

Andalusite stone that resembles a flower

Chrysanthemum Stone
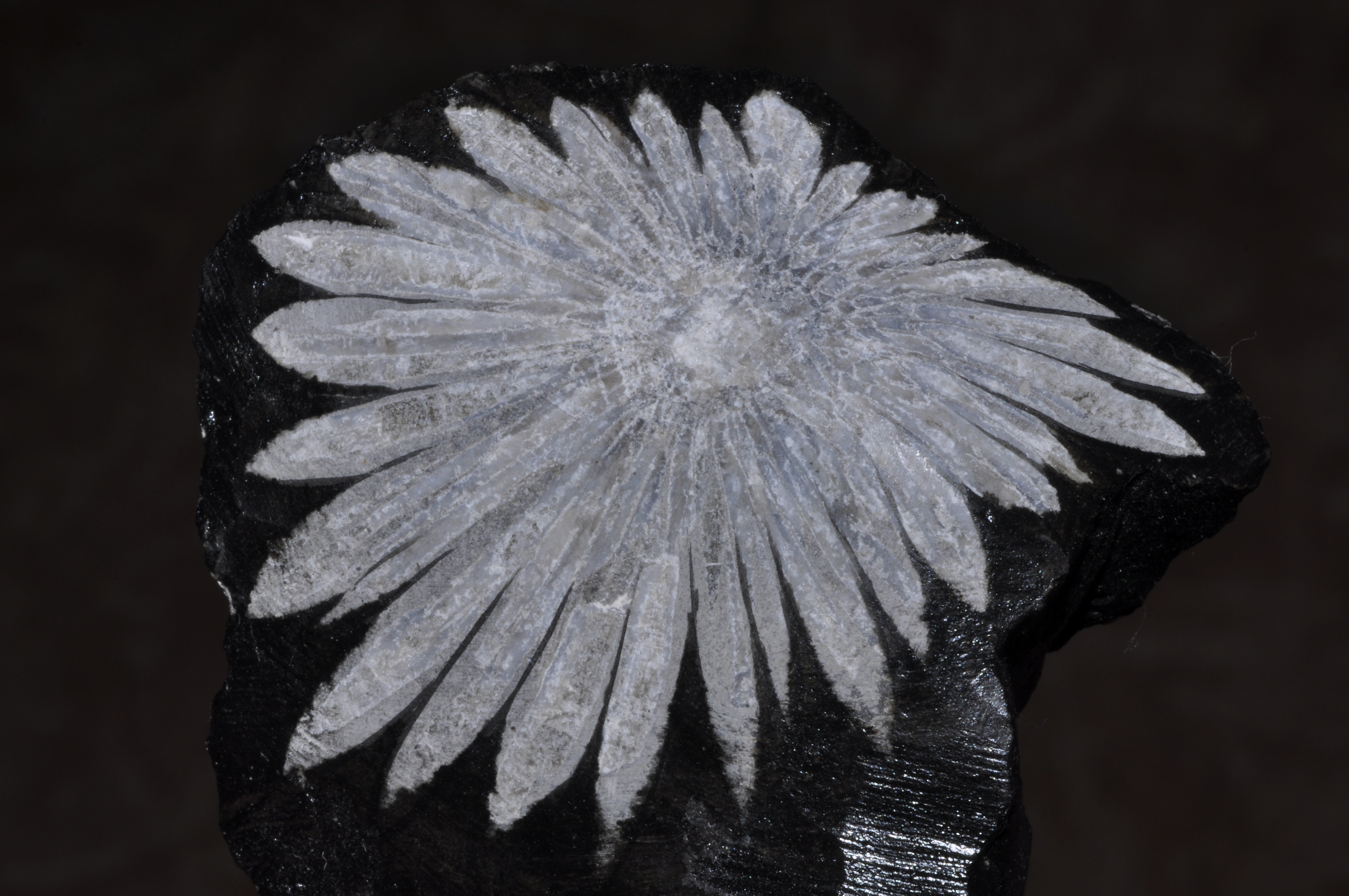

General
- Category: Minerals
- Formula: Al2SiO5
- Crystal system: Rhombohedral

Identification
- Colour: Dark grey to black support with milky white crystals
- Luster: Matte
- Diaphaneity: Opaque
- Common impurities: Strontium, Selenium, trace elements

Chrysanthemum stone, sometimes called "flower stone," is a stone "flower" produced millions of years ago due to geological movement and natural formation in the rock. The stone's pattern resembles the chrysanthemum flower. The flower is milky white and grain is clear.

Chrysanthemum stone is generally dark-gray or black, and does not contain radioactive elements, so it has a high collection value. Although the composition of chrysanthemum stone itself is not very rare, the formation is uncommon, so the stone is listed as a gem.

Vancouver Island in British Columbia Canada, is a well known place to find Flower Stone, mainly on the east coast. It was once commercially mined on Texada island which is off the east coast of Vancouver Island, but there is now a moratorium on mining there, although rock hounds may still hand pick it. Walking on the beach at low tide on either island flower stone can be found, along with Dalasite and Red Jasper.

== The basic features ==
The main component of chrysanthemum stone is Andalusite, so the basic components of the rock are very similar to that of Andalusite. The main component of the mineral is Al_{2}SiO_{5} and it typically forms a rhombic crystal system with columnar crystals. The cross section is close to the regular quadrilateral, and bicrystals are rare.

Chrysanthemum stone has a hard texture. The stone is dark-gray to black in color with naturally formed white chrysanthemum shaped crystals. The "chrysanthemum" part of the "flower" is a collection of crystalline minerals. Each "petal" is a rhombohedral crystal form. The mineral composition varies according to the variety. Chysanthemum stone from Liuyang City, Hunan Province is mainly calcite and chalcedony (quartz), some with ling strontium ore and lapis lazuli.

Chrysanthemum stone carving is a unique handicraft in Liuyang City. Work is created from stone formed approximately 270 million years ago.

=== The physical and chemical analysis ===
Assay proved: chrysanthemum stone does not contain radioactive elements, so it is harmless to human body. The content of beneficial elements such as Fe, Zn, Ca and Se is high.

According to archaeological findings, about 200 million years ago, the hometown of chrysanthemum was still vast ocean and sea. Later, due to the changes of the earth, Liuyang in Hunan entered a period of recession and the sea water accumulated in low-lying places on the surface continued to evaporate. When the concentration of strontium sulfate in seawater increased to a certain extent, crystals are formed and gradually attached to the core of flint.

== Color classification ==
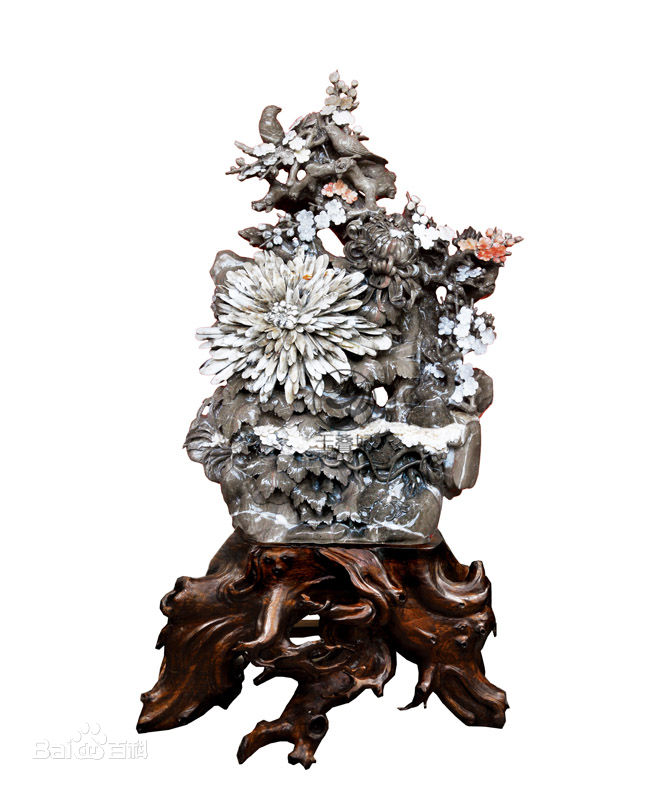

=== Colored chrysanthemum stone ===
Colored chrysanthemum stone is a natural flower in geology. It is only produced in Liuyang, Hunan province. The shape of the petals is lifelike, rich in layers, hard and fine in texture, and the jade is crystal clear, just like the autumn chrysanthemum in full bloom against the frost. It is rich in stone color, tough and fine in stone, and contains strontium, selenium and other trace elements beneficial to human body, which highlights the rarity of chrysanthemum stone.

=== Brown chrysanthemum stone ===
The brown chrysanthemum stone is mainly produced in Liuyang, Hunan province. It is light gray-brown and off-white, and its matrix color is either brown, light gray-black or light gray-brown. Generally, it needs coloring. Brown river stone with smaller flower shape is harder, the flower layer is less, and is easily polished. The brown river stone with larger flower shape has moderate hardness and is easy to sculpt.

=== Black chrysanthemum stone ===
The black chrysanthemum stone is mainly produced in Xuanen, Hubei province. Hubei chrysanthemum stone flower has the shape of irises, claw flower shape, and cylindrical flower shape. The cylindrical flower-shaped stamens are obvious, three-dimensional shaped into a rod with a certain bending. The iris-shaped ones are more common, they are not conspicuous. Petals generally range from 10 to 40, the size is not uniform, the branching is compound with presence of interpenetration and other phenomena.

== Authenticity identification ==
The intact chrysanthemum stone from the naturally exposed environment has become extinct, but in general, it is fragile and easily damaged after being changed by chemical methods. Using the method of a few chemistry or physics to pledge the stone material with loose material consolidates will only strengthen the surface. The crystal in the heart of the chrysanthemum stone is its soul. In addition, it can also be judged from the chrysanthemum stone carving as a whole. The crystal in the center of the real chrysanthemum stone is basically the same color as the petal, and the petal is radially diffused around. And theoretically, a complete three-dimensional chrysanthemum can be obtained by grinding along the central axis of the petals in any direction. Some chrysanthemum stone carvings are combined with real chrysanthemum stone flowers through ordinary stone bodies. The value of this chrysanthemum stone is much lower than that of the real chrysanthemum stone, and such a finished product is also easy to find and identify with the naked eye.

== The difference with peony stone ==
People often confuse the chrysanthemum stone with peony. Peony stone is also found in the Luoyang area and is also a kind of natural stone, the quality of the material is black, white or green flowers. The stone distribution is like a peony in full bloom, peony flower petals are fuller, the size is evener and different from chrysanthemum stone strip petals.

Chrysanthemum stone and peony stone are called strange stones. Peony is also a natural mineral like chrysanthemum stone and can not be regenerated, so it also has a high collection value. In the world, peony stone is also recognized as rare, with collection significance and ornamental value. Peony stone originated in Luoyang, China, and its composition belongs to neutral salt rock.

Although chrysanthemum stone is as rare as peony stone and is often regarded as the same object, the two are completely different. First of all, the composition of the two is different, peony stone is said to be more delicate, the color more obvious. However, the flower pattern of chrysanthemum stone is more three-dimensional and lifelike, so some collectors are more inclined to collect chrysanthemum stone. In addition, when grinding, chrysanthemum stone takes shape faster and is not easy to destroy.

== The meaning of culture ==
It is said that in ancient times, there was a pair of immortals in heaven who fell in love with each other. They sprinkled chrysanthemum which fell in Liuyang river and over time, turned into today's chrysanthemum stone. There is another saying that a pair of lovers fell in love, one of them turned into a stone, the other into a chrysanthemum. They loved each other and did not wish to depart till death, so they became today's chrysanthemum stone finally.

As Hunan's golden card, chrysanthemum stone carving technology came into being in 1740 and had a history of 270 years. Because chrysanthemum stone belongs to non-renewable resources, and only one place in Liuyang belongs to the concentrated origin in the world, it has the title of "the first stone in the world". In 2008, Liuyang chrysanthemum stone carving technology- with its exquisite craftsmanship, ingenious conception and unique natural strange existence- has become the second batch of national intangible cultural heritage projects.

The value and significance of chrysanthemum stone collection lies in its absolute naturalness.

== Historical development ==
The earliest chrysanthemum stone found in China was from the underlying rocks of Liuyang river. According to the records in Liuyang county annals, during the reign of the Qianlong Emperor of the Qing dynasty, a man called Ouxifan accidentally found chrysanthemum stone.

Chrysanthemum stone is collected and exhibited in the state guesthouse, China art museum, Hunan art museum, etc. Also, great Chairman Mao, revolutionary martyr Tan sitong and others- among other favorite things- have used the chrysanthemum stone. These items are now displayed in the memorial hall.

In 1915, the Panamanian World Expo- the exhibition of chrysanthemum stone carvings- surprised the world, the "stones can bloom" won the "rare treasures gold award" and has been preserved in the United Nations Museum. In 1959, during the founding of the people's Republic of China, the people of Liuyang presented a huge three-dimensional sculpture "Shi Jusen Mountain" to the Great Hall of the people in Beijing for viewing by the people of all ethnic groups. From 1997 to 1999, the whole country rejoiced, celebrating the return of Hong Kong and Macao. Liuyang people specially created two commemorative chrysanthemum stone carvings dedicated to the Hong Kong and MSAR governments.

Because the formation of chrysanthemum stone requires specific physical and chemical conditions, and time, the number of chrysanthemum stone is very small in nature and rare in the world, so the related industry of chrysanthemum stone belongs to a typical resource-constrained industry.
