= Gejia, Liuyang =

Gejia Town 葛家镇
- Town
- Location in Hunan
- Coordinates: 28°04′37″N 113°27′31″E
- Country: People's Republic of China
- Province: Hunan
- Prefecture-level city: Changsha
- County-level city: Liuyang

Area
  - Total: 107 km^{2} (41 sq mi)

Population (2015)
  - Total: 20,100
  - Density: 188/km^{2} (487/sq mi)
- Time zone: UTC+8 (China Standard)
- Postal code: 410328
- Area code: 0731

Gejia Town (simplified Chinese: 葛家镇; traditional Chinese: 葛家鎮; pinyin: Gějiā Zhèn) is a rural town in Liuyang City, Hunan Province, People's Republic of China. As of the 2015 census it had a population of 20,100 and an area of 107 square kilometres (41 sq mi). It is surrounded by the towns of Dongyang and Jiangbei on the north, Beisheng Town on the northwest, Chengchong Town on the southwest, Zhentou Town on the west, Jili Subdistrict on the east, and Puji Town on the south.

== History ==
In June 2016, Gejia was upgraded to a town.

== Administrative division ==
The township is divided into five villages, which include the following areas:

- Xinjian Village (新建村)
- Gejiayuan Village (葛家园村)
- Jinyuan Village (金源村)
- Yutan Village (玉潭村)
- Xinhong Village (新宏村)

== Geography ==
Liuyang River, also known as the mother river, flows through the town.

== Economy ==
The town's main industries are agriculture and fireworks.

== Education ==
- Gejia Middle School

== Transportation ==
=== Provincial Highway ===
Provincial Highway S103 passes across the town west to east.

=== County Roads ===
The town is connected to two county roads: X014 and X016.

== Attractions ==
The Former Residence of Song Renqiong is a well-known scenic spot.

== Celebrity ==
- Song Renqiong (1909–2005), politician.
