= Former Residence of Tan Sitong =

- 谭嗣同故居
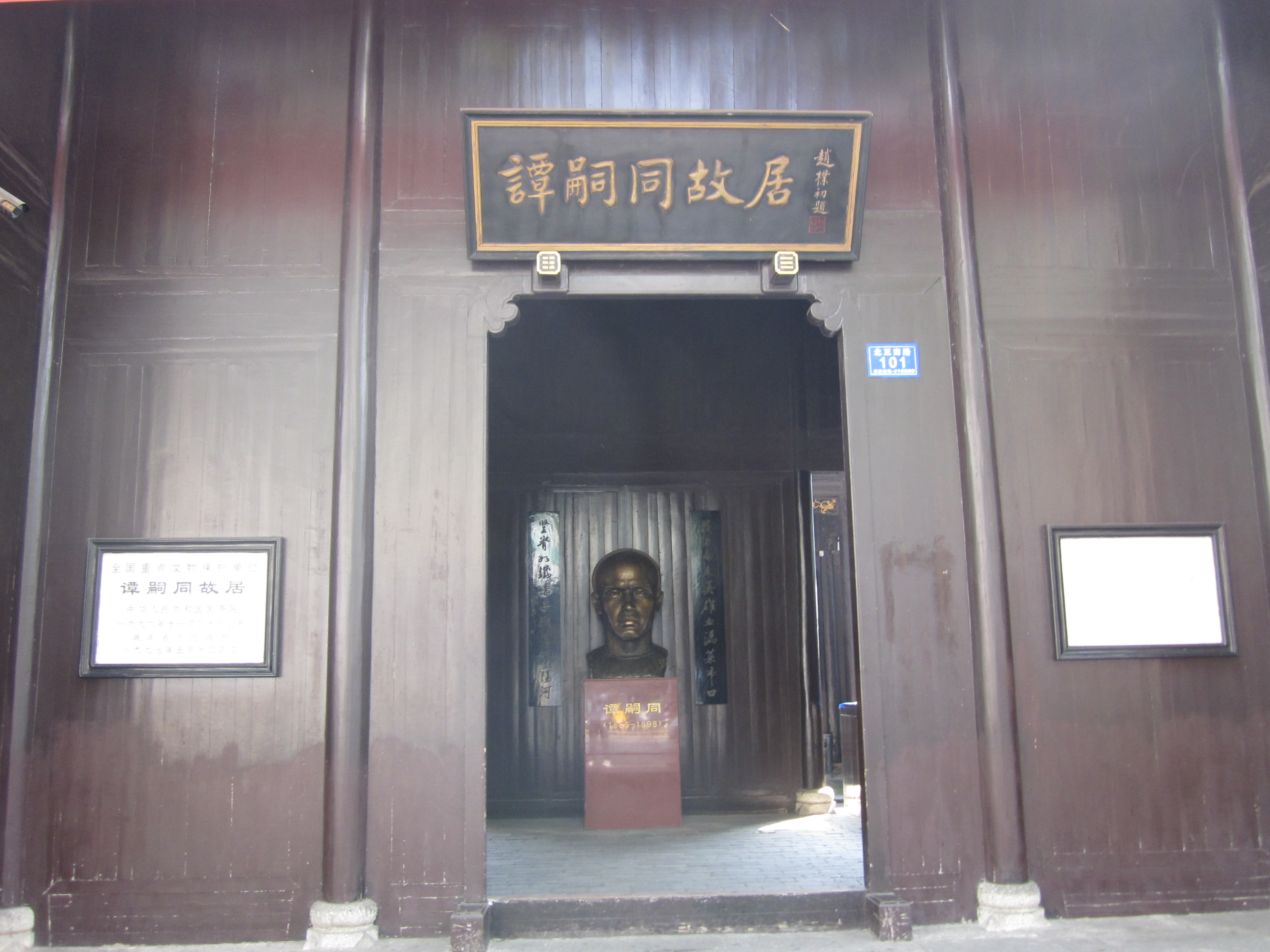
- Former Residence of Tan Sitong.

- Location within Hunan

General information
- Type: Traditional folk houses
- Location: Liuyang, Hunan, China
- Coordinates: 28°08′30″N 113°37′52″E
- Owner: Government of Liuyang

Technical details
- Floor area: 760 m^{2} (8,200 sq ft)
- Grounds: 1,200 m^{2} (13,000 sq ft)

The Former Residence of Tan Sitong or Tan Sitong's Former Residence (simplified Chinese: 谭嗣同故居; traditional Chinese: 譚嗣同故居; pinyin: Tán Sìtóng Gùjū) was built in the late Ming dynasty (1368–1644). It is located in Liuyang, Hunan. The house occupies a building area of 760 square metres (8,200 sq ft) and the total area over 1,200 square metres (13,000 sq ft).

== History ==
From age 15 to 17, Tan Sitong lived here.

In November 1996, it was listed as a "Major Historical and Cultural Site Protected at the National Level" by the State Council of China.

In April 2002, it was listed as a "Patriotic Education Base" by the Hunan Provincial People's Government.

== Gallery ==
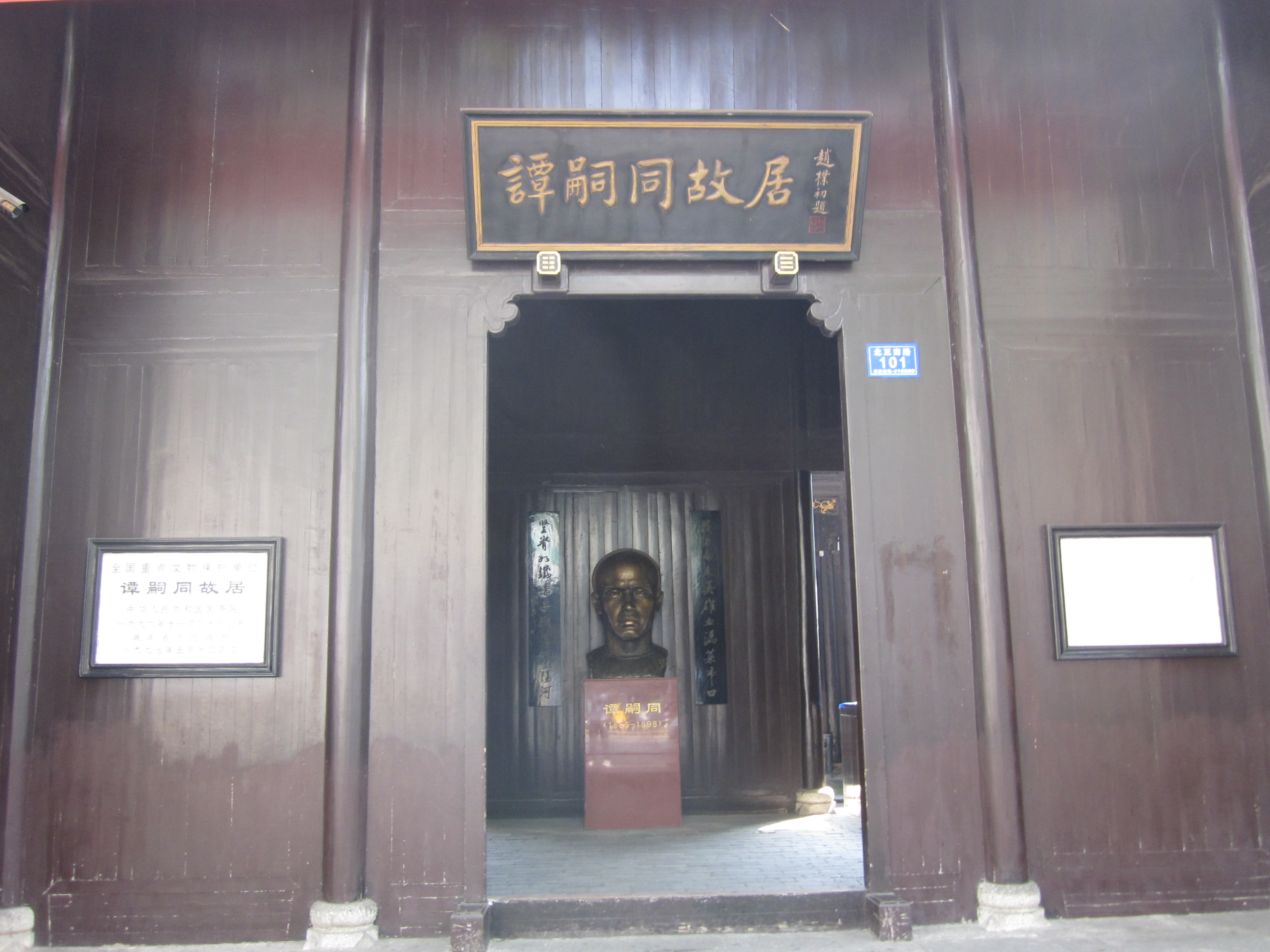
The gate

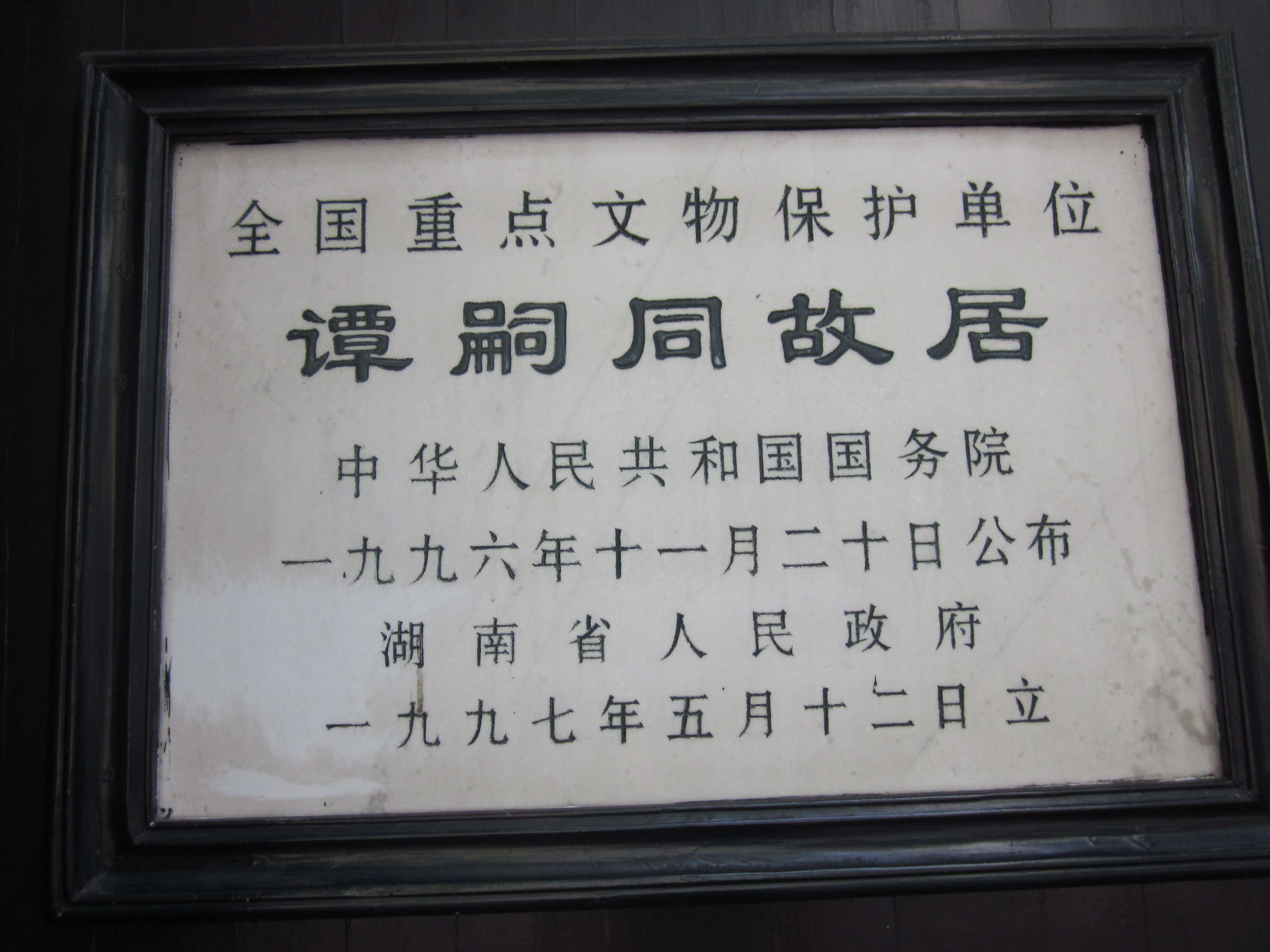
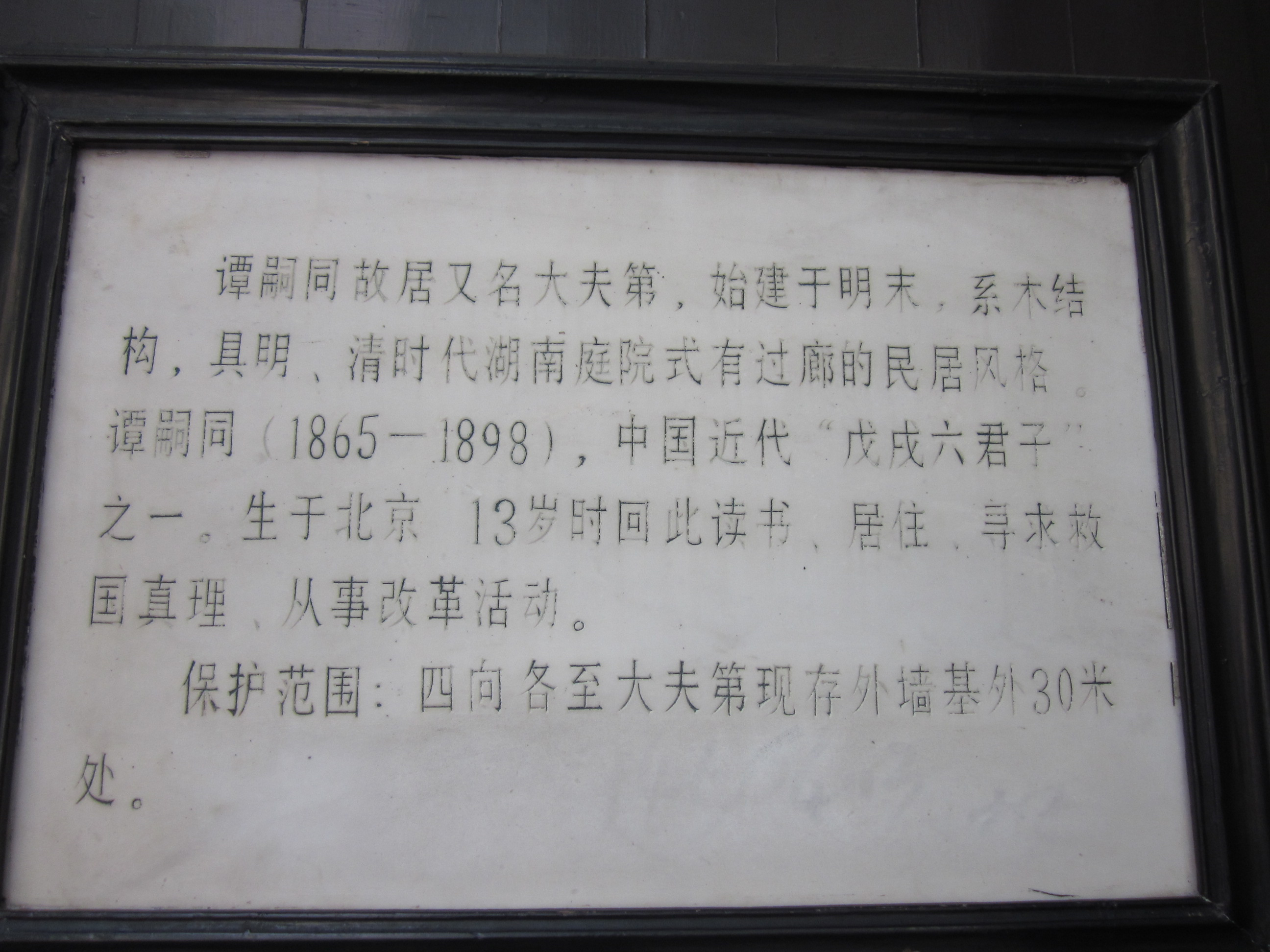

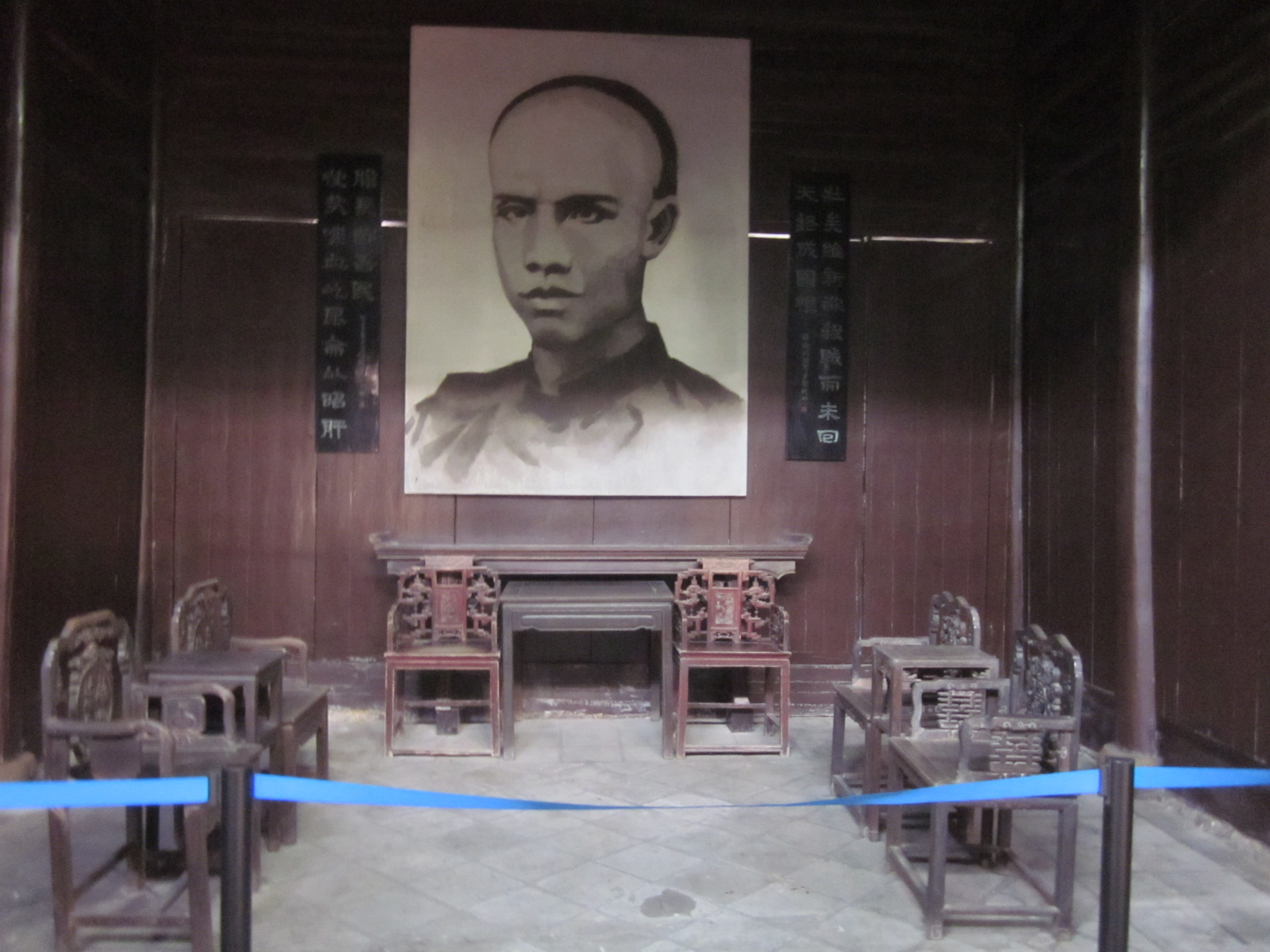
Tan Sitong's portrait.

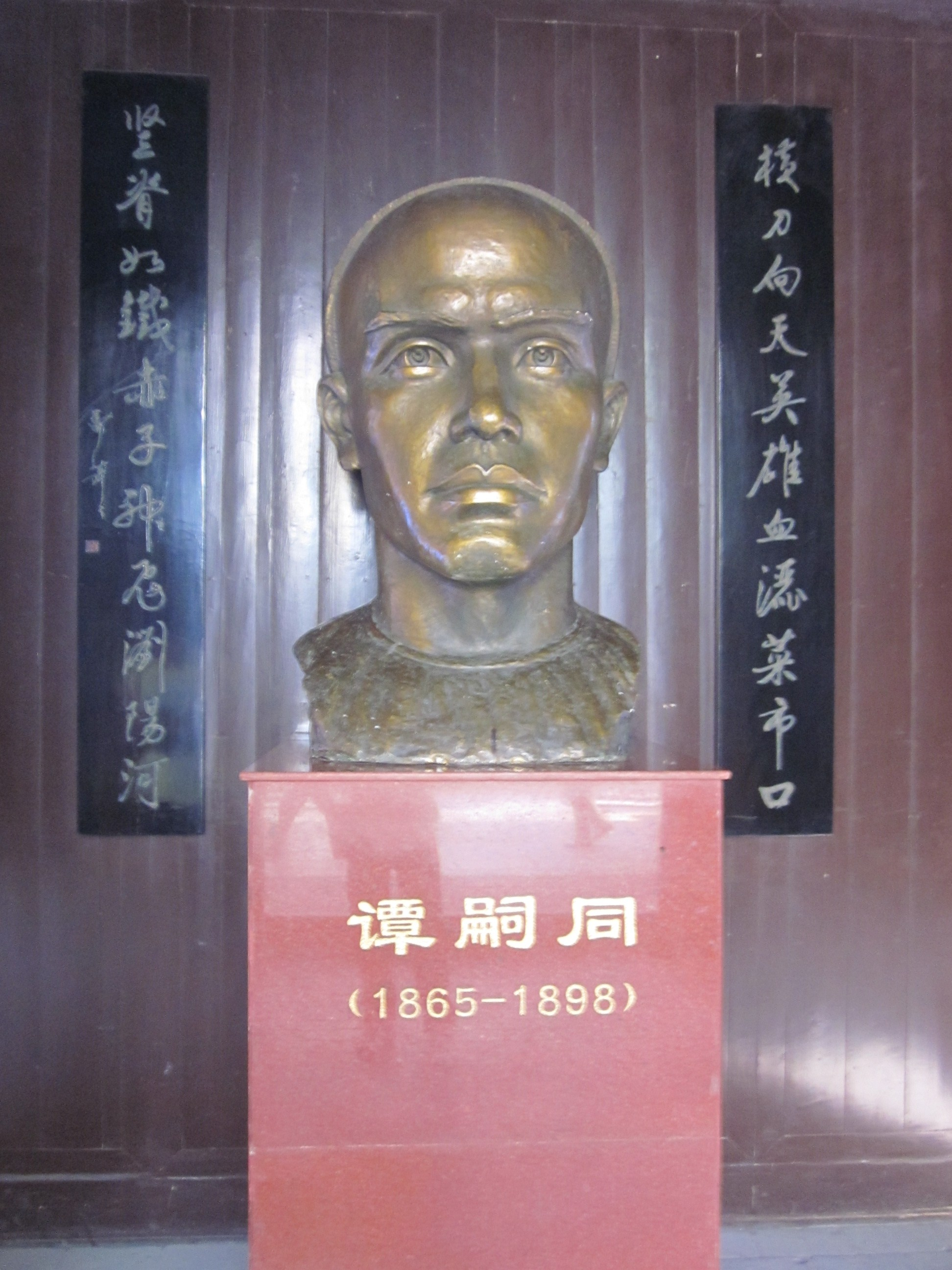
The statue of Tan Sitong.

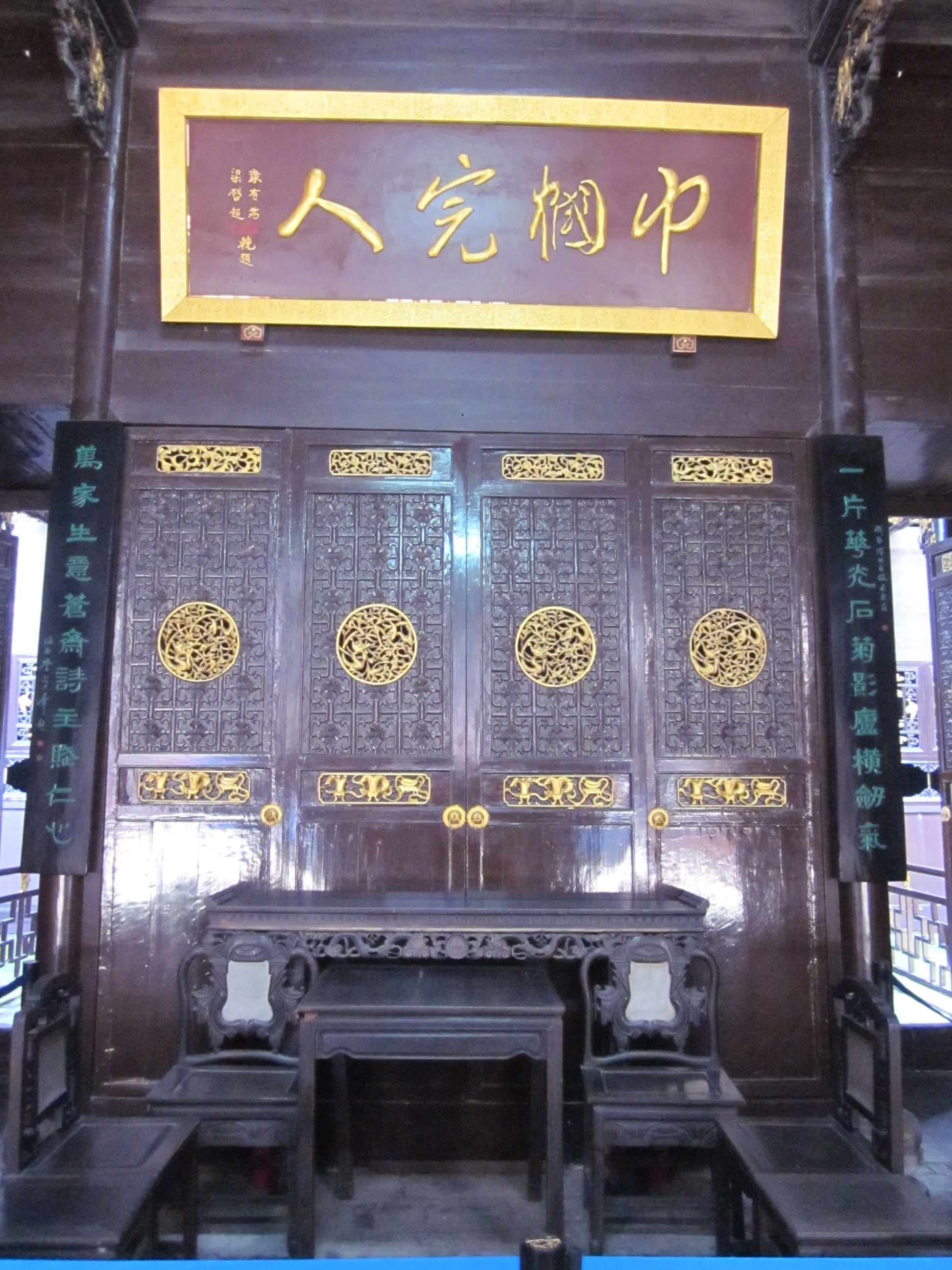
The horizontal tablet.

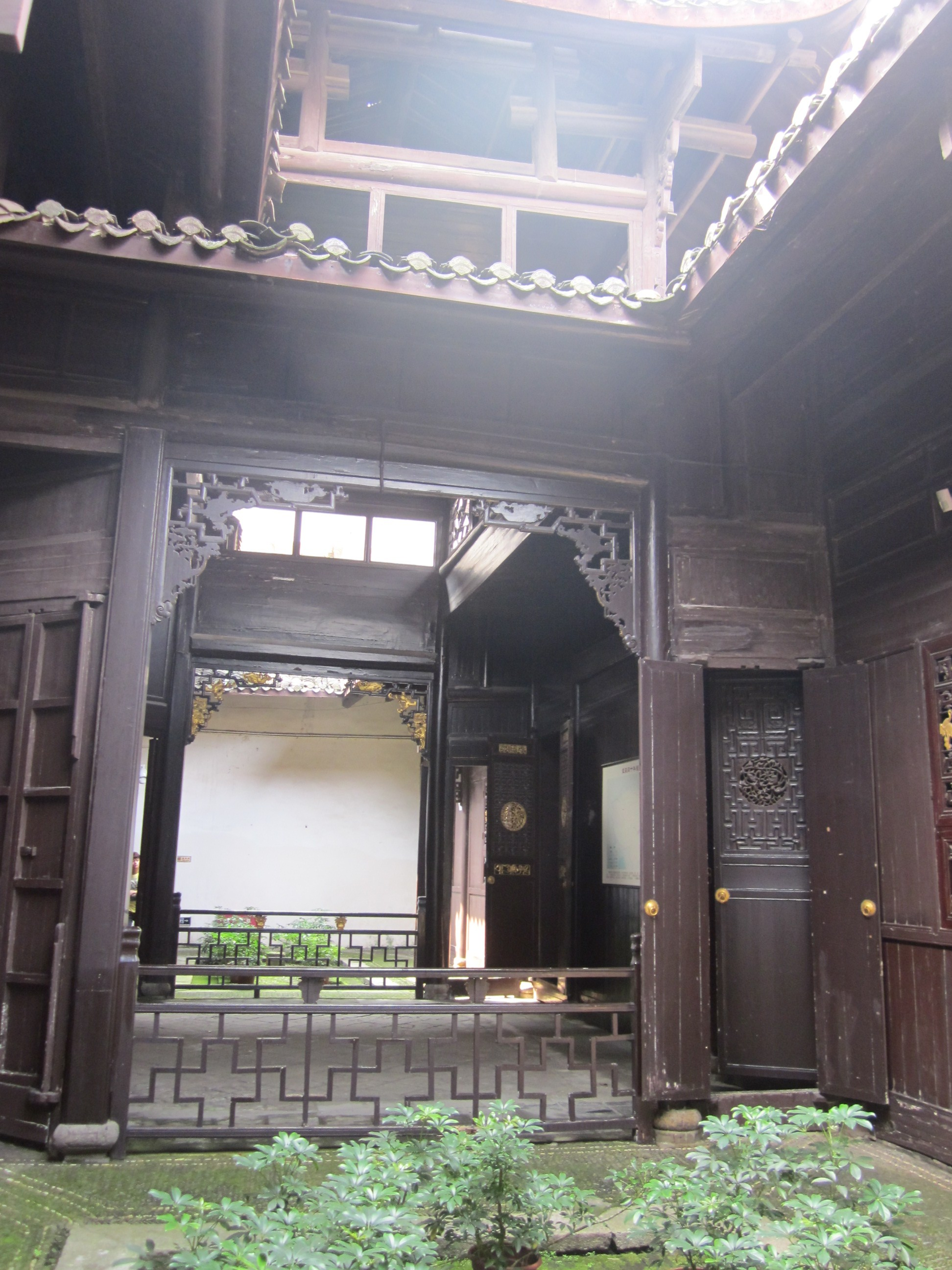
