= Xiaohe, Liuyang =

Xiaohe Township 小河乡
- Township
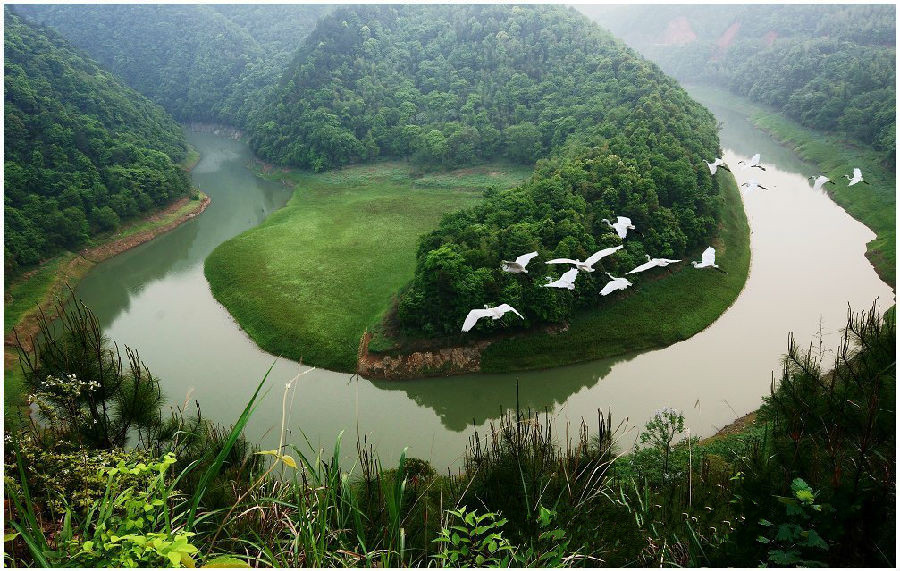
- The Crocodile river bay in Xiaohe, Liuyang

- Location in Hunan
- Coordinates: 28°2′22″N 114°03′31″E
- Country: People's Republic of China
- Province: Hunan
- Prefecture-level city: Changsha
- County-level city: Liuyang

Area
  - Total: 111.8 km^{2} (43.2 sq mi)

Population (2015)
  - Total: 15,500
  - Density: 139/km^{2} (359/sq mi)
- Time zone: UTC+8 (China Standard)
- Postal code: 410308
- Area code: 0731

Xiaohe Township (simplified Chinese: 小河乡; traditional Chinese: 小河鄉; pinyin: Xiǎohé Xiāng) is a rural township in Liuyang City, Hunan Province, People's Republic of China. As of the 2015 census it had a population of 15,500 and an area of 11.8 square kilometres (4.6 sq mi). It is surrounded by Baishui Township on the east, Zhangfang Town on the north, Huangmao Town on the south, and Yonghe Town on the west.

== Administrative divisions ==
As of April 2016, the village-level divisions of Xiaohe Township were adjusted from seven to five. There are five villages in the township.

English name	Chinese name	Notes
Wushi Village	乌石村	
Tanwan Village	潭湾村	village reformed by merging the former Tanwan Village and Yanping Village
Xinhe Village	新河村	village reformed by merging the former Xinhe Village and Jinsha Village
Huangbei Village	皇碑村	
Tianxin Community	田心社区	

== Geography ==
The Zhushuqiao Reservoir (株树桥水库) is located in the township.

The Xiaoxi River (小溪河) runs northeast–southwest through the township.

Mount Jinzhonghu (金钟湖) is the highest point in the township, which stands 884.7 metres (2,903 ft) above sea level.

Mount Qiyan (旗燕山) is the second highest natural elevation in the township, with 776 metres (2,546 ft) above sea level.

== Economy ==
Xiaohe Township's manufacturing products include fireworks.

Black goat, rabbit and pig are important to the economy.

== Education ==
- Xiaohe Middle School

== Transportation ==
The County road X001 runs through the town.

== Celebrity ==
- Tang Ping (汤平), a lieutenant general in the People's Liberation Army.
- Wang Shaokun (王绍坤), revolutionary.
- Guo Ziming (郭子明), military officer in the Chinese Red Army.
