= Liuyang High-Tech Industrial Development Zone =

Liuyang High-Tech Industrial Development Zone (Chinese: 浏阳高新技术产业开发区) is a Hi-tech Industrial Development Zone at province level in Liuyang City, Hunan Province, China. It is the 2nd largest industrial zone of Liuyang by economic volume, after the Liuyang Economic and Technological Development Zone. The industrial zone is the original Liuyang Manufacturing industrial Base (Chinese: 浏阳制造产业基地) created in 2003, it was Changed to the present name on 14 July 2016. The industrial zone centers in Yong'an Town of Liuyang, covering an area of 36.64 square kilometres (14.15 sq mi). As of 2015, its gross output value of industries is CNY 30.31 billion (US$4.87 billion), the financial revenue reaches 1.01 billion yuan (US$0.16 billion).
