= Chengtanjiang, Liuyang =

Chengtanjiang Town 澄潭江镇
- Town
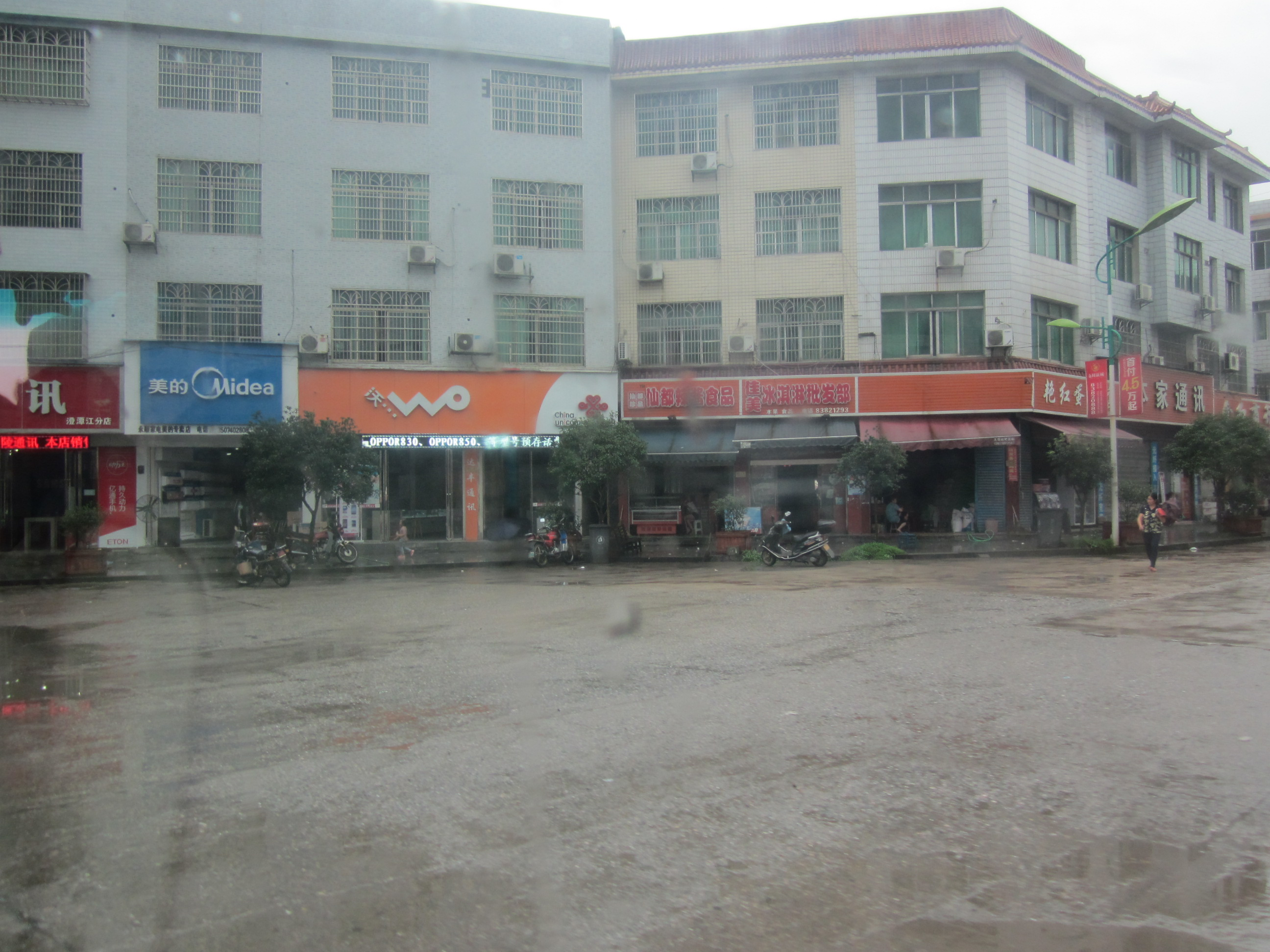
- Chengtanjiang Town.

- Location in Hunan
- Coordinates: 28°00′05″N 113°46′43″E
- Country: People's Republic of China
- Province: Hunan
- Prefecture-level city: Changsha
- County-level city: Liuyang

Area
  - Total: 158.8 km^{2} (61.3 sq mi)

Population (2015)
  - Total: 65,100
  - Density: 410/km^{2} (1,060/sq mi)
- Time zone: UTC+8 (China Standard)
- Postal code: 410314
- Area code: 0731

Chengtanjiang Town (simplified Chinese: 澄潭江镇; traditional Chinese: 澄潭江鎮; pinyin: Chéngtánjiāng Zhèn) is a suburban town under the administration of Liuyang City, Hunan Province, People's Republic of China. According to the 2015 census, it had a population of 65,100 and an area of 158.8 square kilometres (61.3 sq mi). The town shares a border with Hehua Subdistrict to the northwest, Jingang Town to the southwest, Jinshan Town of Shangli County to the south, Wenjiashi Town to the southeast, Zhonghe Town to the east, and Gaoping Town to the north.

== History ==
In 1995, Dasheng Township (大圣乡) and Shanxia Township (山下乡) merged to form Chengtanjiang Town.

== Administrative divisions ==
The town is divided into eight villages and two communities:

- Jizhen Community (集镇社区)
- Huaishu Community (槐树社区)
- Wutian Village (吾田村)
- Huxing Village (虎形村)
- Dasheng Village (大圣村)
- Bixi Village (碧溪村)
- Zhoutian Village (洲田村)
- Jingping Village (荆坪村)
- Daping Village (达坪村)
- Hejia Village (和家村)

== Economy ==
The town's main industries are agriculture, fireworks and coal resources.

== Geography ==
The Nanchuan River (南川河) flows through the town.

Zhangcao Reservoir (漳槽水库) is the largest reservoir and largest water body in the town.

== Education ==
- Chengtanjiang Middle School

== Transportation ==
=== Provincial Highway ===
The Provincial Highway S310 passes across the town west to east.

=== County Road ===
The County Road X006 runs north–south through the town.
