= Chunkou, Liuyang =

Chunkou Town 淳口镇
- Town
- Location in Hunan
- Coordinates: 28°17′38″N 113°29′52″E
- Country: People's Republic of China
- Province: Hunan
- Prefecture-level city: Changsha
- County-level city: Liuyang

Area
  - Total: 233.5 km^{2} (90.2 sq mi)

Population (2015)
  - Total: 66,900
  - Density: 287/km^{2} (742/sq mi)
- Time zone: UTC+8 (China Standard)
- Postal code: 410329
- Area code: 0731

Chunkou Town (simplified Chinese: 淳口镇; traditional Chinese: 淳口鎮; pinyin: Chúnkǒu Zhèn) is a suburban town in Liuyang City, Hunan Province, People's Republic of China. According to the 2015 census, it had a population of 66,900 and an area of 233.5 square kilometres (90.2 sq mi). It borders Longfu Town in the north, Gugang Town in the east and northeast, Guankou Subdistrict in the southeast, Jiaoxi Township in the south, Beisheng Town in the southwest, and Shashi Town in the west.

== Administrative divisions ==
The town is divided into 11 villages and three communities, which include the following areas:

- Nongda Community (农大社区)
- Yanggutan Community (羊古滩社区)
- Heyuan Community (鹤源社区)
- Nanchong Village (南冲村)
- Yatou Village (鸭头村)
- Gaotian Village (高田村)
- Luyan Village (炉烟村)
- Huangjingping Village (黄荆坪村)
- Xiejia Village (谢家村)
- Shiyan Village (狮岩村)
- Xiangping Village (向坪村)
- Shantianxin Village (山田新村)
- Tonghui Village (同辉村)
- Fenglinhu Village (枫林湖村)

== Geography ==
Liuyang River, also known as the mother river, flows through the town.

The town has a reservoir and a lake: Nankang Reservoir (南康水库) and Fenglin Lake (枫林湖; 'Lake of Maple Garden').

Mount Wangfengjian (王峰尖) is the peak-point in the town. Its peak elevation is 882.5 metres (2,895 ft).

== Economy ==
Chunkou Town's economy is based on nearby mineral resources and agricultural resources, such as lead minerals, copper minerals and kaolinite minerals.

== Education ==
- Chunkou Middle School

== Transportation ==
=== National Highway ===
The National Highway G106 passes across the town north to south.

=== County roads ===
The town is connected to two county roads: X009 and X010.

== Attraction ==
Liudiequan Rafting (六叠泉漂流) is a well-known scenic spot in the town.
