= Liuyang Confucius Temple =

- 浏阳孔庙
- Main hall

- Location within Hunan

Religion
- Affiliation: Confucianism

Location
- Location: Liuyang, Hunan
- Country: China
- Interactive map of Liuyang Confucius Temple
- Coordinates: 28°08′36″N 113°38′01″E

Architecture
- Style: Chinese architecture
- Founder: Yang Shi
- Established: Northern Song dynasty (960–1127)
- Completed: 1843 (reconstruction)

Liuyang Confucius Temple (simplified Chinese: 浏阳文庙; traditional Chinese: 瀏陽文廟; pinyin: Liúyáng Wénmiào) is a Confucian temple located in Liuyang, Hunan. It covers an area of 6,000 square metres (65,000 sq ft).

== History ==
Liuyang Confucius Temple was first built in the Northern Song dynasty (960–1127) by Confucian Yang Shi (scholar).

In 1818, the temple was relocated in the present address. In 1843, the temple was rebuilt.

In March 2013, it was listed as a "Major Historical and Cultural Site Protected at the National Level" by the State Council of China.
