= Jiaoxi, Liuyang =

Jiaoxi Township 蕉溪乡
- Township
- Location in Hunan
- Coordinates: 28.2190°N 113.4764°E
- Country: People's Republic of China
- Province: Hunan
- Prefecture-level city: Changsha
- County-level city: Liuyang

Area
  - Total: 87.6 km^{2} (33.8 sq mi)

Population (2016)
  - Total: 28,000
  - Density: 320/km^{2} (830/sq mi)
- Time zone: UTC+8 (China Standard)
- Postal code: 410324
- Area code: 0731

Jiaoxi Township (simplified Chinese: 蕉溪乡; traditional Chinese: 蕉溪鄉; pinyin: Jiāoxī Xiāng) is a rural township in Liuyang City, Hunan Province, People's Republic of China. As of the 2016 census it had a population of 28,000 and an area of 87.6 square kilometres (33.8 sq mi). It is surrounded by Chunkou Town on the north, Beisheng Town on the northwest, Dongyang Town on the west, Guankou Subdistrict on the east, and Jili Subdistrict on the south.

== Administrative divisions ==
The township is divided into six villages, which include the following areas: Gaosheng Village (高升村), Jiaoxi Village (蕉溪村), Changfeng Village (常丰村), Hantian Village (早田村), Shuiyuan Village (水源村), and Jinyuan Village (金云村).

== Geography ==
Liuyang River, also known as the mother river, flows through the township.

Wanfeng Lake (万丰湖) and Shidong Lake (石洞湖) are popular attractions in the township.

== Economy ==
Tobacco and herbal medicine are important to the economy.

== Education ==
- Jiaoxi Middle School

== Transportation ==
=== Expressway ===
The Changsha-Liuyang Expressway in Hunan province leads to Changsha and Liuyang runs through the township.

=== National Highway ===
The G106 National Highway, which runs north through the towns of Chunkou, Longfu and Shegang to Pingjiang County, and the southeast through the subdistricts of Jili and Guankou and Jingang Town to Litian Town of Liling.

The G319 National Highway, runs west through the towns of Dongyang and Yong'an, and the southeast through the subdistricts of Jili and Guankou and Dayao Town to Shangli County.

== Attractions ==
Quantai Academy (泉台书院), Shade Ancient Bridge (沙德古桥) and Pengjia Ancient Houses (彭家老屋) are well known tourist spots in the township.
