= Yanxi, Liuyang =

Yanxi Town 沿溪镇
- Town
- Location in Hunan
- Coordinates: 28°19′54″N 113°48′55″E
- Country: People's Republic of China
- Province: Hunan
- Prefecture-level city: Changsha
- County-level city: Liuyang

Area
  - Total: 119.6 km^{2} (46.2 sq mi)

Population (2015)
  - Total: 32,000
  - Density: 270/km^{2} (690/sq mi)
- Time zone: UTC+8 (China Standard)
- Postal code: 410304
- Area code: 0731

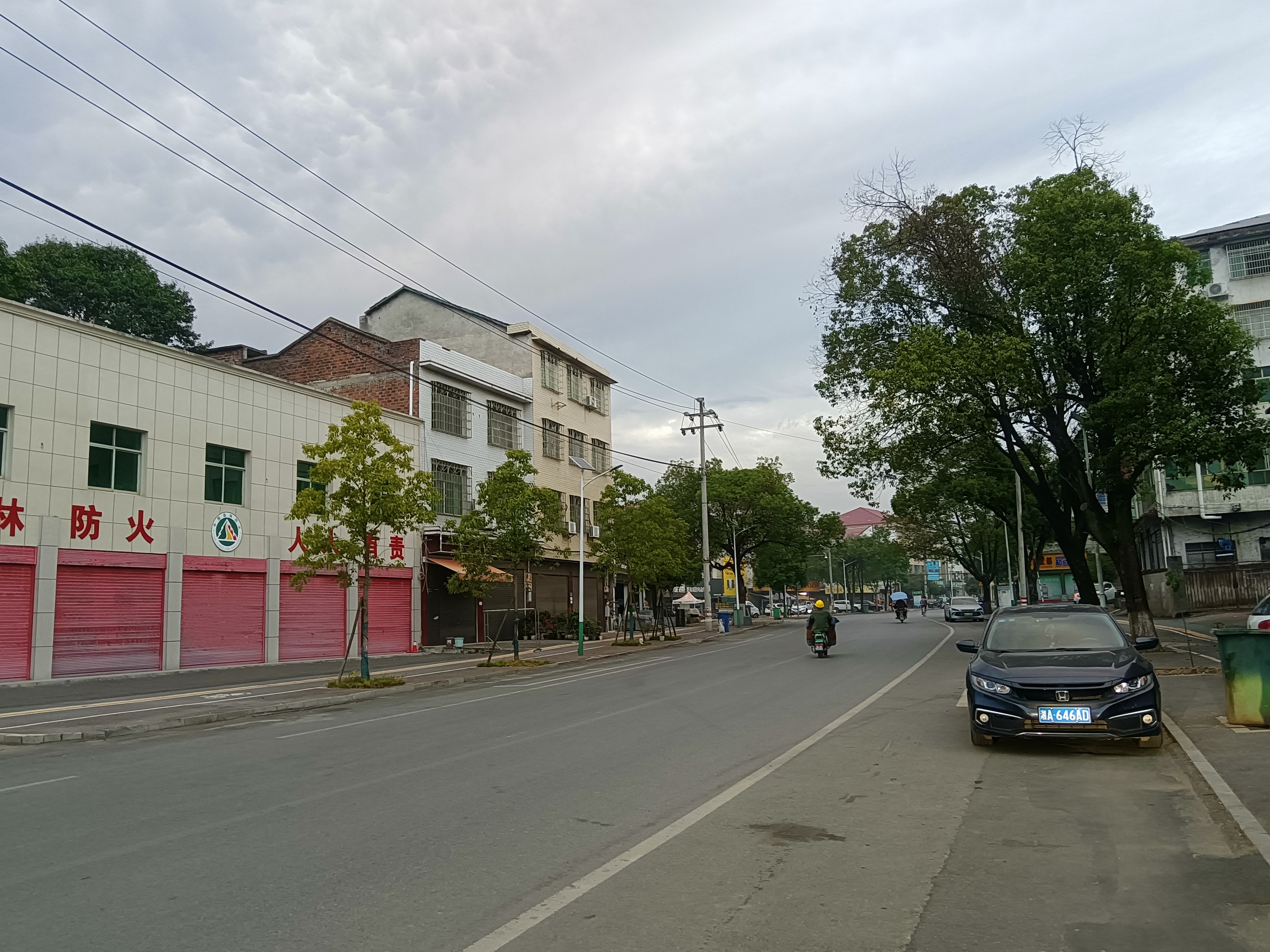
Residential buildings on both sides of the road in the town of Yanxi (2024)

Yanxi Town (simplified Chinese: 沿溪镇; traditional Chinese: 沿溪鎮; pinyin: Yánxī Zhèn) is a rural town in Liuyang City, Hunan Province, People's Republic of China. As of the 2015 census it had a population of 32,000 and an area of 119.6 square kilometres (46.2 sq mi). It is surrounded by Fushoushan Town of Pingjiang County on the north, Dahu Town on the northeast, Gugang Town on the west, Guandu Town on the east, and Yonghe Town on the south.

== Administrative divisions ==
The town is divided into four villages and three communities, which include the following areas:

- Yanxiqiao Community (沿溪桥社区)
- Jianshe Community (建设社区)
- Daguang Community (大光元社区)
- Shalong Village (沙龙村)
- Lihua Village (礼花村)
- Jinqiao Village (金桥村)
- Huayuan Village (花园村)

== Geography ==
The Daxi River (大溪河) flows through the town.

The Dajingchong Reservoir (大荆冲水库) is the largest body of water in the town. It was built in the 1960s to provide drinking water for the town. The reservoir has also become a place for recreation for nearby residents.

Mountains located adjacent to and visible from the townsite are: Mount Tianzigang (天子岗; 1,279.4 metres (4,198 ft)) and Mount Fushou (福寿山; 1,542 metres (5,059 ft)).

== Economy ==
The main industries in and around the town are fireworks and animal farming.

== Education ==
- Yanxi Middle School

== Transportation ==
=== Expressway ===
The Changsha–Liuyang Expressway, from Changsha, running through the town to Jiangxi.

=== Provincial Highway ===
The Provincial Highway S309 runs southwest to northeast through the town.

== Attractions ==
Mount Feilong (飞龙山; 'Mount of Flying Dragon') and Lake Tianzi (天子湖; 'Emperor Lake') are famous scenic spots.

== Religion ==
There are two Buddhist temples situated at the town: Huangtan Temple (黄昙寺) and Daguang Temple (大光寺).
