= Gugang, Liuyang =

Gugang 古港镇
- Town
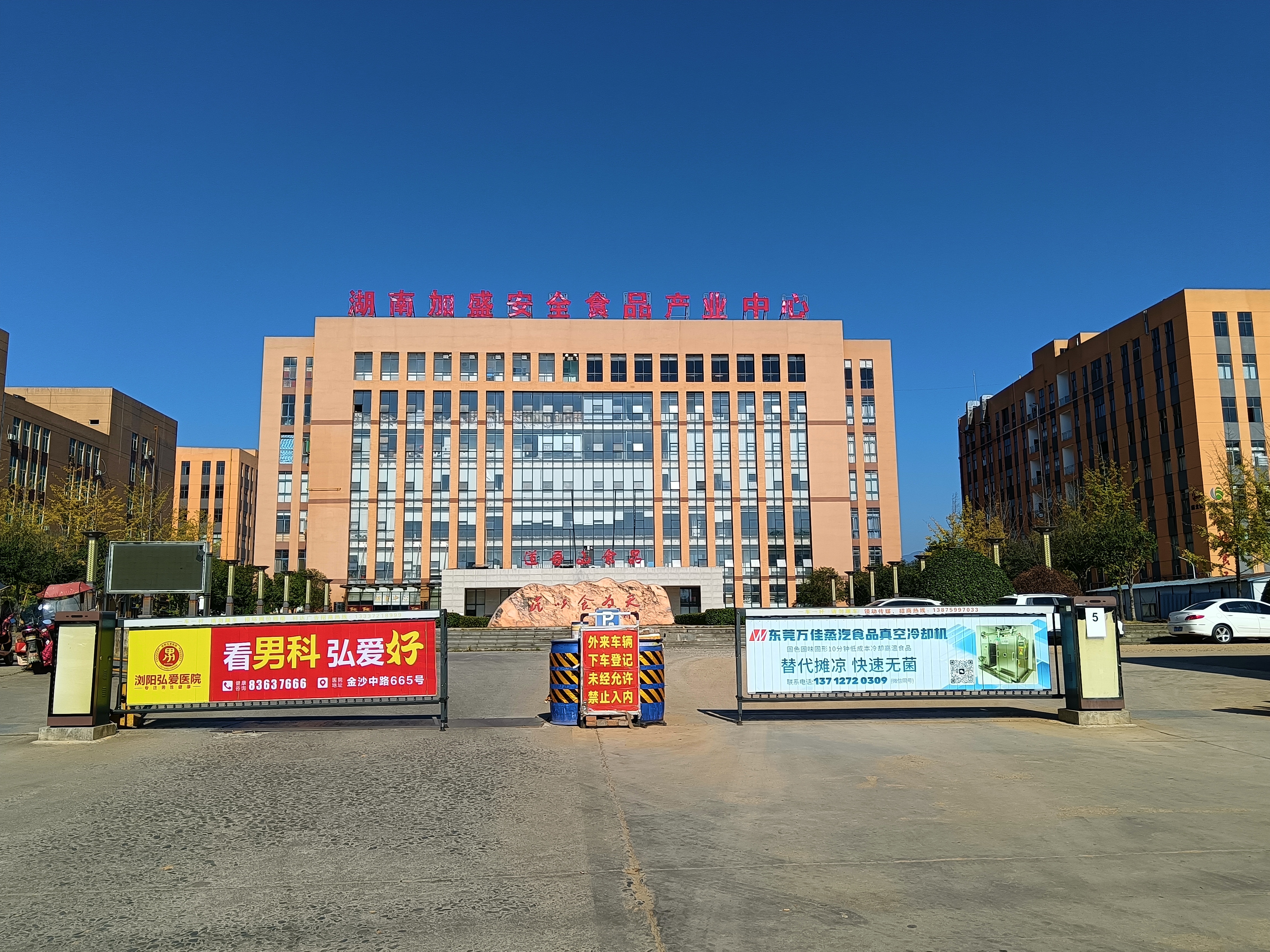
- Hunan Jiasheng Safe Food Industry Center in Gugang Town

- Location in Hunan
- Coordinates: 28°17′11″N 113°44′33″E
- Country: People's Republic of China
- Province: Hunan
- Prefecture-level city: Changsha
- County-level city: Liuyang

Area
  - Total: 210 km^{2} (81 sq mi)

Population (2015)
  - Total: 62,700
  - Density: 300/km^{2} (770/sq mi)
- Time zone: UTC+8 (China Standard)
- Postal code: 410301
- Area code: 0731

Gugang (simplified Chinese: 古港镇; traditional Chinese: 古港鎮; pinyin: Gǔgǎng Zhèn) is a rural town in Liuyang City, Hunan Province, People's Republic of China. As of the 2015 census it had a population of 62,700 and an area of 210 square kilometres (81 sq mi). The town is bordered to the north by Fushoushan Town of Pingjiang County, to the east by Yanxi Town, to the southeast by Yonghe Town, to the west by Chunkou Town and Guankou subdistrict, to the south by Gaoping Town, and to the northwest by Shegang Town.

== History ==
In 2015, the former Gugang Town and Sankou Town (Chinese: 三口镇) merged to form the new Gugang Town.

== Administrative divisions ==
The town is divided into 12 villages and four communities, which include the following areas:

- Taoyuan Community (桃园社区)
- Gugang Community (古港社区)
- Gucheng Community (古城社区)
- Guojiating Community (郭家亭社区)
- Fanshi Village (范市村)
- Xianzhou Village (仙洲村)
- Mianjiang Village (沔江村)
- Meitianhu Village (梅田湖村)
- Jinyuan Village (金园村)
- Xinyuan Village (新园村)
- Yangang Village (燕港村)
- Huacheng Village (花城村)
- Baogaisi Village (宝盖寺村)
- Bailu Village (白路村)
- Huaxiang Village (华湘村)
- Dongying Village (东盈村)

== Geography ==
Mountains located adjacent to and visible from the townsite are: Mount Xiangluguan (Chinese: 香炉罐; 278.7-metre (914 ft)) and Mount Hanpo'ao (Chinese: 寒婆坳; 1,244.3-metre (4,082 ft)).

Liuyang River, also known as the mother river, flows through the town.

The town has two reservoirs: Guojiachong Reservoir (Chinese: 郭家冲水库) and Meitian Reservoir (Chinese: 梅田水库).

== Economy ==
The economy is supported primarily by farming and ranching.

== Education ==
Gugang Middle School is the only junior highschool in Gugang. Besides, the No.3 senior highschool of Liuyang is settled here.

== Transportation ==
=== Expressway ===
The Changsha–Liuyang Expressway, from Changsha, running west to east through the town to Jiangxi.

=== Provincial Highway ===
The Provincial Highway S309 passes across the town west to east.

== Attractions ==
Huanglongxia Rafting (黄龙峡漂流; 'Yellow Dragon Gorge Rafting') is a famous scenic spot in the town.
