= Daweishan =

Daweishan 大围山镇
- Town
- Location in Hunan
- Coordinates: 28°27′27″N 114°00′33″E
- Country: People's Republic of China
- Province: Hunan
- Prefecture-level city: Changsha
- County-level city: Liuyang

Area
  - Total: 401.7 km^{2} (155.1 sq mi)

Population (2015)
  - Total: 27,400
  - Density: 68.2/km^{2} (177/sq mi)
- Time zone: UTC+8 (China Standard)
- Postal code: 410309
- Area code: 0731

Daweishan Town (simplified Chinese: 大围山镇; traditional Chinese: 大圍山鎮; pinyin: Dàwéishān Zhèn) is a rural town in Liuyang City, Hunan Province, People's Republic of China. As of the 2015 census, it had a population of 27,400 and an area of 401.7 square kilometres (155.1 sq mi). It borders Pingjiang County in the north, Paibu Town of Jiangxi in the east, Zhangfang Town in the south, and Dahu Town in the west and southwest.

== History ==
According to the Total annals of the Qing Dynasty (大清一统志), the name of Daweishan derives from the view of the town shrouded by mountains.

In 1995, the Zhongyue Township (中岳乡) and former Daweishan Township (大围山乡) merged to form the Daweishan Town.

In 2005, Baisha Township (白沙乡) was merged into the town.

== Administrative divisions ==
The town is divided into 10 villages and two communities, which include the following areas:

- Dongmen Community (东门社区)
- Baisha Community (白沙社区)
- Zhongyue Village (中岳村)
- Tongxing Village (同幸村)
- Zhongduan Village (中塅村)
- Jinzhongqiao Village (金钟桥村)
- Chudong Village (楚东村)
- Tianxinqiao Village (田心桥村)
- Shangping Village (上坪村)
- Liuheyuan Village (浏河源村)
- Beiluyuan Village (北麓园村)
- Daweishan Village (大围山村)

== Geography ==
The Daxi River (大溪河) flows through the town.

There are a number of popular mountains located immediately adjacent to the townsite which include Mount Qixingling (七星岭, 1,607.9 metres (5,275 ft)); Mount Baimianshi (白面石, 1,215.6 metres (3,988 ft)); Mount Chongtian Lazhu (冲天蜡烛, 841 metres (2,759 ft)); Mount Lingpai (灵牌山, 727 metres (2,385 ft)); Mount Diaoshuijian (吊水尖, 839.2 metres (2,753 ft)); and Mount Wangpojian (王婆尖, 951 metres (3,120 ft)).

== Economy ==
The local economy is primarily based upon agriculture and tourism.

Wood, fruit, traditional Chinese medicine and phyllostachys pubescens are important to the economy.

== Education ==
- Daweishan Middle School

== Transportation ==
The County Road X002 passes across the town west to east.

== Attractions ==
A national park is located southeast of the town: Daweishan National Forest Park (大围山国家森林公园). Daweishan Rafting (大围山漂流) is a famous scenic spot.

Other main attractions are the Dongmen Ancient Town (东门古镇), Weishan Academy (围山书院) and Tomb of Tang Shou (宋代汤寿古墓).
