= Ouyang Yuqian Grand Theater =

Theater in Liuyang, China

Coordinates: 28°08′47″N 113°38′46″E

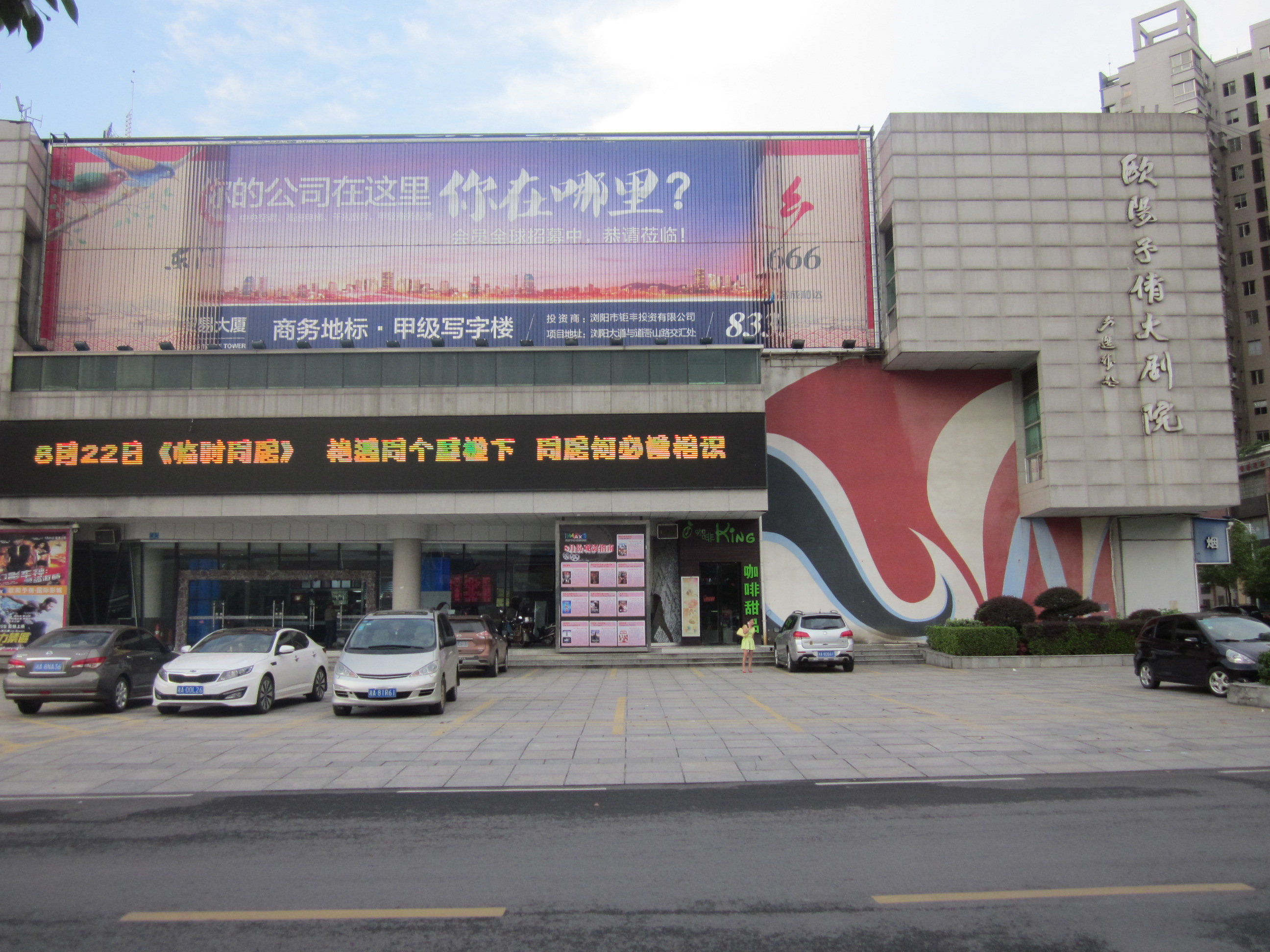
The Ouyang Yuqian Grand Theater.

The Ouyang Yuqian Grand Theater (simplified Chinese: 欧阳予倩大剧院; traditional Chinese: 歐陽予倩大劇院; pinyin: Ōuyáng Yǔqiàn Dàjùyuàn) is a theater in Liuyang, Hunan, China. The theater, which opened in 2002, consists of 15000 square meters, including a movie theater, a bar, an arts training centre, and a teahouse. The theater was named after Chinese dramatist Ouyang Yuqian, and is used for drama, musical, and children's performances. It stands on the riverside of Liuyang River, and is backed by Tianma Mountain.
