= Grass cloth =

Handloom cloth with yarns from vegetable fibers

Grass cloth (China grass cloth, ) is an umbrella term for many handloom cloths made with yarns from several vegetable fibers such as hemp, ramie, nettle fiber, flax, etc. Grass cloth has its origin in East Asia. The cloth is more associated with the cottage industry in China.

It is also known as "Canton linen" and "Japanese grass cloth"

== Weave ==
Grass cloth is a loose weave structure with a plain weave.

== Texture ==
Grass cloth has a soft texture and fine enough to compare with French cambric. China grass cloth made with Chines ma, a species of canabbis hemp, is very lightweight and appears like linen.

== Use ==
Grass cloth used for various usages such as tablecloths, sportswear, and blouses.

== See also ==
- Linen
