= Liuyang Economic and Technological Development Zone =

Liuyang Economic and Technological Development Zone (simplified Chinese: 浏阳经济技术开发区; traditional Chinese: 瀏陽經濟技術開發區; pinyin: Liúyáng Jīngjì Jìshù Kāifāqū; abbr: LETZ) is an economic and technical development zone (ETZ) in Liuyang City, Hunan Province, China, one of four national ETZs in Changsha. It is the original Liuyang Industrial Park (浏阳工业园) created on 10 January 1998. In September 2001, it was renamed to Liuyang Biomedical Park (浏阳生物医药园). In March 2012, it was upgraded to a national economic and technical development zone. As of 2015, its builtup area covers 16.5 km^{2} (6.4 sq mi).

The zone is a national biological industry base, located in Dongyang Town, 25 kilometres (16 mi) east of Changsha. Its pillar industry comprises biological pharmacy, Information technology and Health food. As of 2015, It has more than 700 registered enterprises. In 2016, the total industrial gross output of the zone hits 100.3 billion yuan (US$ 15.1 billion).
