= Chunhua, Changsha =

Chunhua 春华镇
- Town
- Interactive map of Chunhua
- Coordinates: 28°16′32″N 113°15′21″E
- Country: China
- Province: Hunan
- Prefecture-level city: Changsha
- County: Changsha

Area
  - Total: 130 km^{2} (50 sq mi)
- Elevation: 42 m (138 ft)

Population (2000)
  - Total: 41,639
  - Density: 320/km^{2} (830/sq mi)
- Time zone: UTC+8 (China Standard)

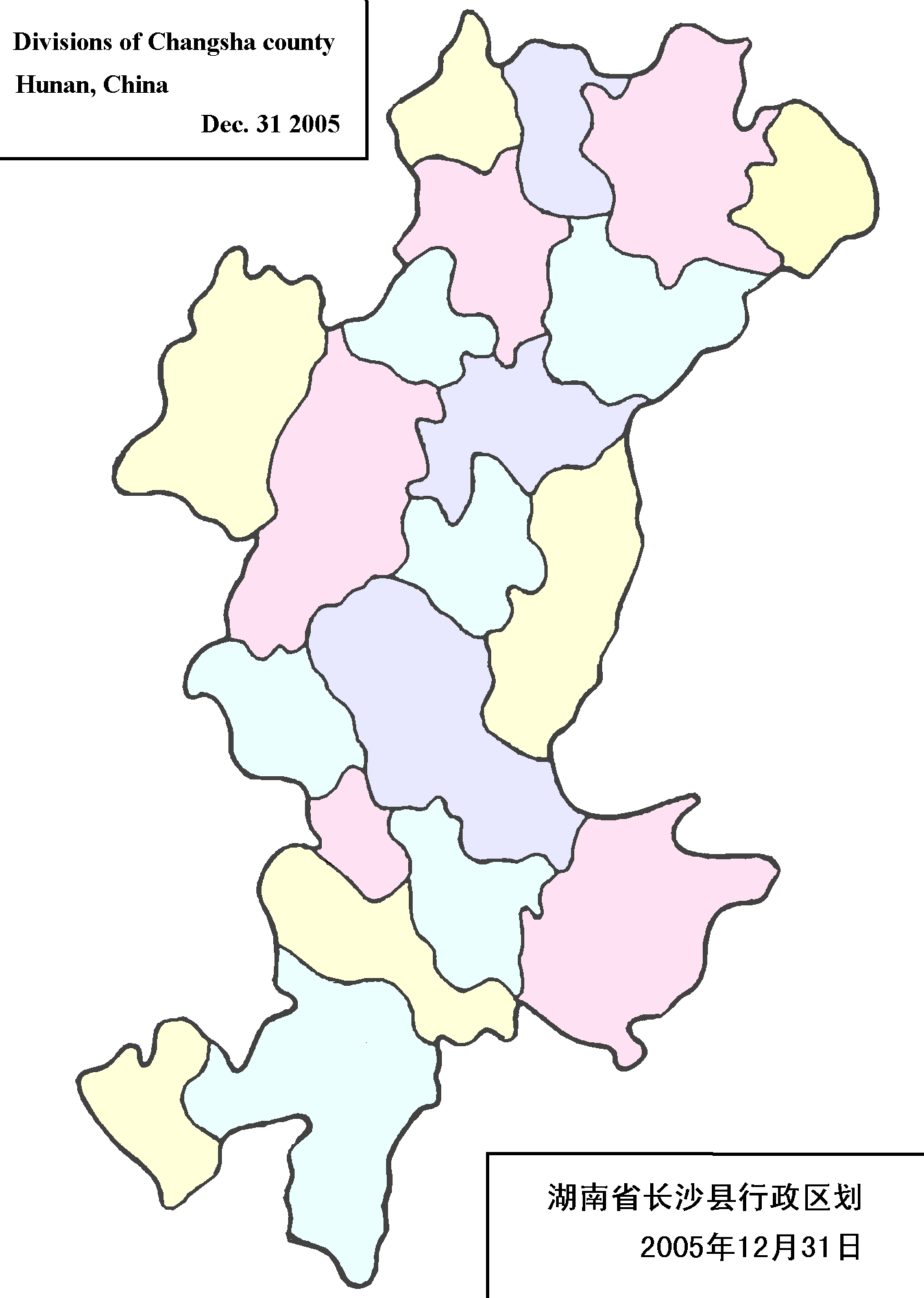
Template:image label

Chunhua Town (simplified Chinese: 春华; traditional Chinese: 春華; pinyin: Chūnhuá) is a town in Changsha County, northeastern Hunan province, South Central China. It contains 12 villages and one community, and is located around 17 kilometres (11 mi) east of the county seat, at the boundary region between Changsha County and Liuyang City. Bordering towns are Lukou to the east, Lukou to the west, and Huanghua to the southwest; Chunhua also borders Yong'an (永安镇) and Shashi (沙市镇) of Liuyang City.
