= Xingsha =

Xingsha 星沙镇
- Town
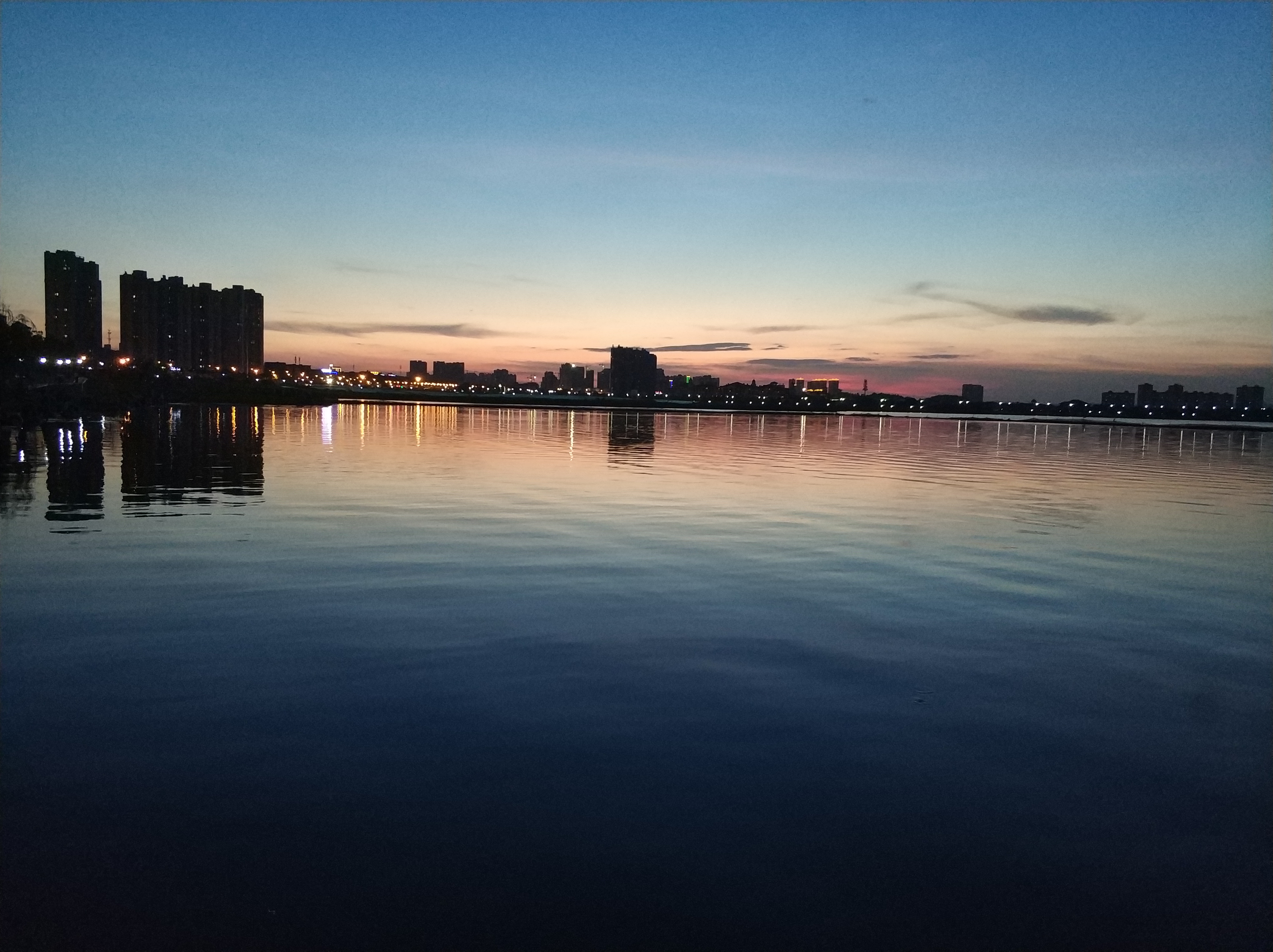
- Songya Lake at dusk, 26 June 2018.

- Location in Hunan
- Coordinates: 28.257324°N 113.123405°E
- Country: People's Republic of China
- Province: Hunan
- Prefecture-level city: Changsha
- County: Changsha

Area
  - Total: 68 km^{2} (26 sq mi)

Population (2010 census)
  - Total: 277,034
  - Density: 4,100/km^{2} (11,000/sq mi)
- Time zone: UTC+8 (China Standard)

Xingsha (Chinese: 星沙) is a historic town of Changsha County, Hunan Province, China. Nowadays it is the geographical regions of the former Xingsha Town, including Xingsha, Xianglong and Quantang three subdistricts and the connected areas.

Located in the south western part of Changsha County and the eastern suburb of Changsha City, Xingsha is the downtown of Changsha County and the eastern part of the metropolis of Changsha. It is home of Changsha Economic and Technological Development Zone.

== History ==
The Xinsha Economic and Technological Development Zone was organized in Wangxin Township (望新乡) of Changsha County in 1992. Xinsha Town was reformed by merging Wangxin and Luositang Townships (螺丝塘乡) in May 1995. The seat of Changsha County was transferred from Panjiaping (潘家坪) of Kaifu District to Xingsha in 1996. The Xingsha, Xianglong and Quantang three subdistricts were formed with the abolishment of Xinsha Town in September, 2009.
