= Shuangjiang =

Shuangjiang (simplified Chinese: 双江; traditional Chinese: 雙江; pinyin: Shuāngjiāng), may refer to:

- Shuangjiang (solar term), 18th solar term in traditional East Asian calendars
- Shuangjiang Lahu, Va, Blang and Dai Autonomous County, in Yunnan, China

== Towns in China ==
Shuangjiang (双江镇), the name of several towns in China:

- Shuangjiang, Tongdao (双江镇), a town and the seat of Tongdao County, Hunan.
- Shuangjiang, Loudi (双江乡), a township of Louxing District, Loudi City, Hunan.
- Shuangjiang, Changsha, a former town of Changsha County, merged to Jinjing Town on November 19, 2015.
