= Ligong Temple =

Taoist temple in Hunan, China

- 李公庙
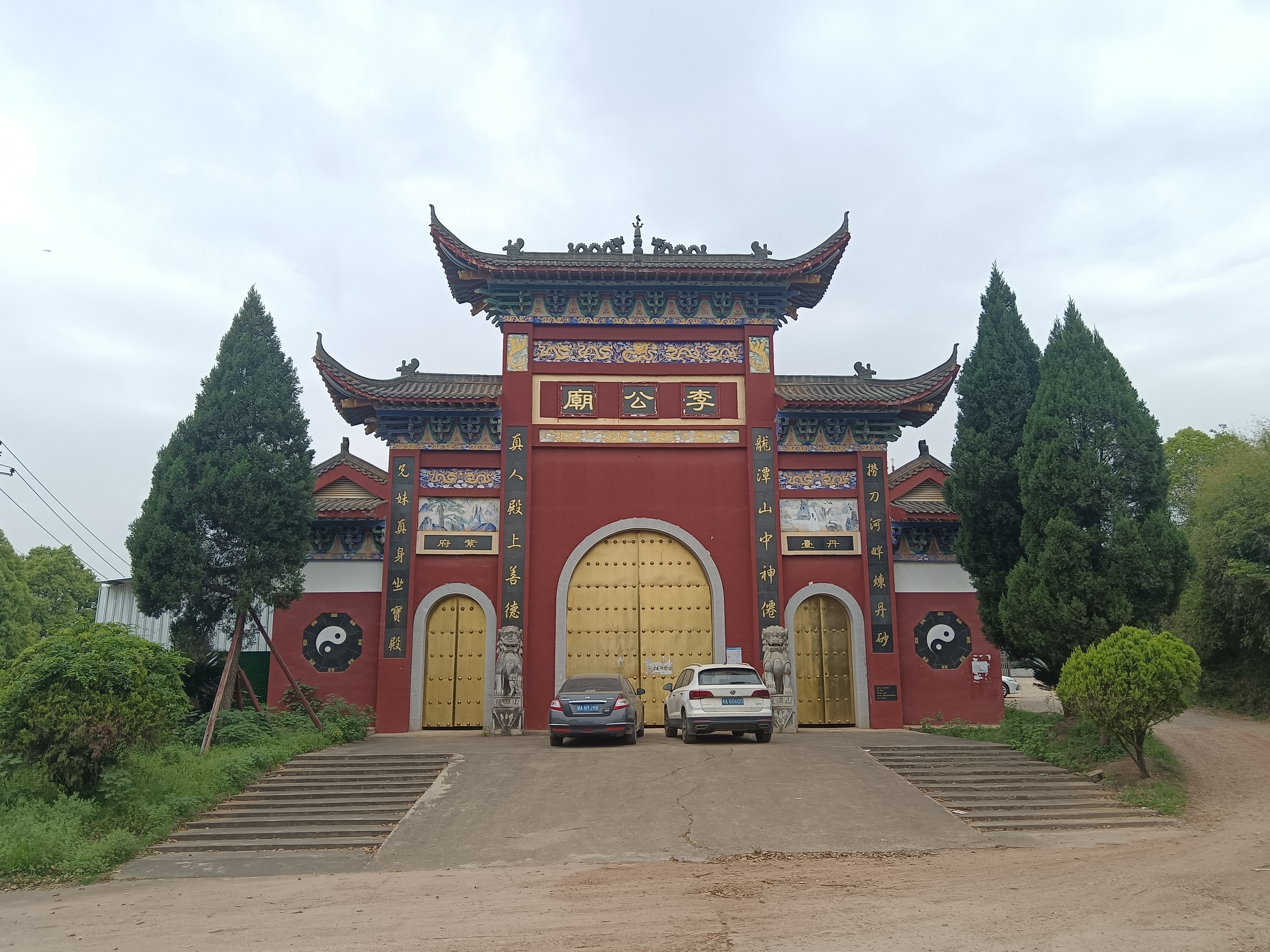
- Mount Gate

- Location within Hunan

Religion
- Affiliation: Taoism
- Deity: Li Zhenren

Location
- Location: Xingsha Subdistrict of Changsha County, Hunan, China
- Coordinates: 28°17′00.97″N 113°05′13.88″E

Architecture
- Style: Chinese architecture
- Established: Southern Song dynasty (1127–1279)

Ligong Temple (simplified Chinese: 李公庙; traditional Chinese: 李公廟; pinyin: Lǐ Gōng Miào; lit. 'Temple of Venerable Li') is a Taoist temple located at Dragon Pool Mountain in Xingsha Subdistrict of Changsha County, Hunan, China. The site overlooks the Laodao River, integrating natural scenery with spiritual significance.

== Etymology ==
The name 李公庙; 李公廟; Lǐ Gōng Miào, Li is a common Chinese surname, and 公; gōng, an honorific title meaning "venerable", "lord" or "revered elder". Thus, "李公; Lǐ Gōng" refers to Li Gong Zhenren (李公真人; Lǐ Gōng Zhēnrén) or 李真人; Lǐ Zhēnrén, a deified Taoist figure worshipped in the temple.

== History ==
Ligong Temple is a Taoist temple situated on Dragon Pool Mountain (龙潭山; 龍潭山; Lóngtán Shān) with historical roots in the Southern Song dynasty (1127–1279). According to legends, Li Zhenren was born in 1190 in Changsha's Flower Fruit Garden area (花果园; 花果園; Huāguǒyuán). His mother dreamed of a purple aura before his birth, symbolizing his divine nature. Li Zhenren was renowned for studying Taoism, Confucianism, and Buddhism, and for healing the sick. Following his Taoist master, Zhou Yexian (周野仙; Zhōu Yěxiān), he achieved the Tao. Legend says he and his sister ate a peach given by an immortal and attained their ascension, with their bodies undergoing "feathered transformation" and remaining incorrupt. His body was originally enshrined in the temple. After his death, he was venerated as a protector against disasters and droughts.

Ligong Temple gained imperial recognition during the Qing dynasty (1644–1911). In 1825, prayers to Li Zhenren ended a severe drought, leading Daoguang Emperor to grant him the title "Guangji Zhenren" (广济真人; 廣濟真人; Guǎngjì Zhēnrén; 'Broad Salvation True Person'). The temple was further inscribed into state rituals in 1848.

== Architecture ==
The temple complex spans 0.085-square-kilometre (0.033 sq mi) and features traditional Chinese architecture arranged along a central axis. Key halls include Mount Gate, Main Hall, Bell Tower, Drum Tower, Eight Immortals Hall:

- Main Hall (Zhenren Hall): dedicated to Li Zhenren, whose statue is the central focus.
- Left Wing Hall: enshrines Hua Tuo (medical deity) and the God of Wealth.
- Right Wing Hall: features Guanyin, Guan Yu (Taoist deity), and the Dragon King.
- Eight Immortals Hall: enshrines the Eight Immortals.

== Cultural Relics ==
A pair of Qing-era stone Chinese guardian lions guards the main entrance.

Stele and Inscriptions: Stone tablets detail the temple's history, including a stele commissioned by Governor Wu Dacheng in 1895 during the late Qing dynasty (1644–1911).

== Gallery ==
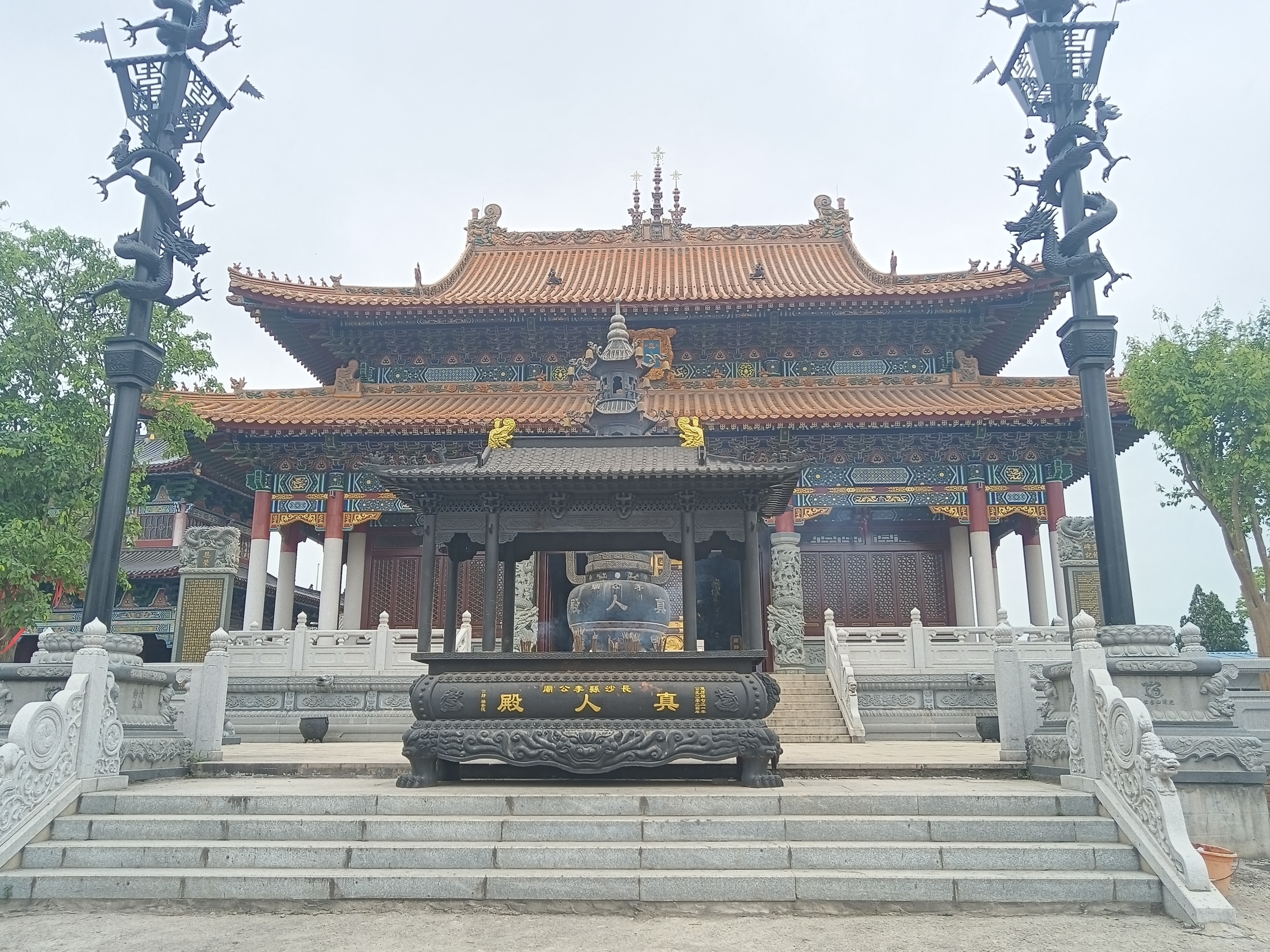
Zhenren Hall

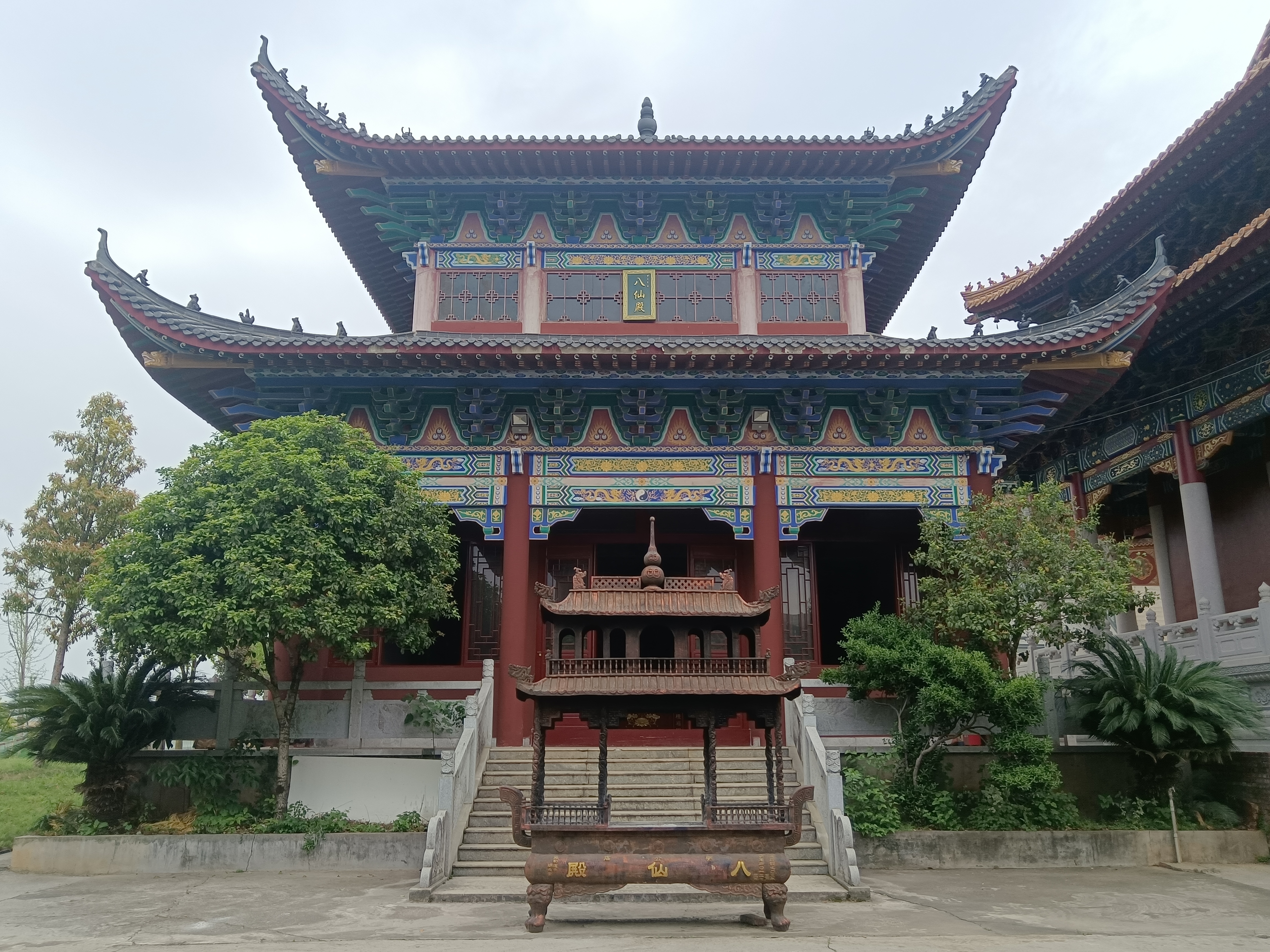
Eight Immortals Hall

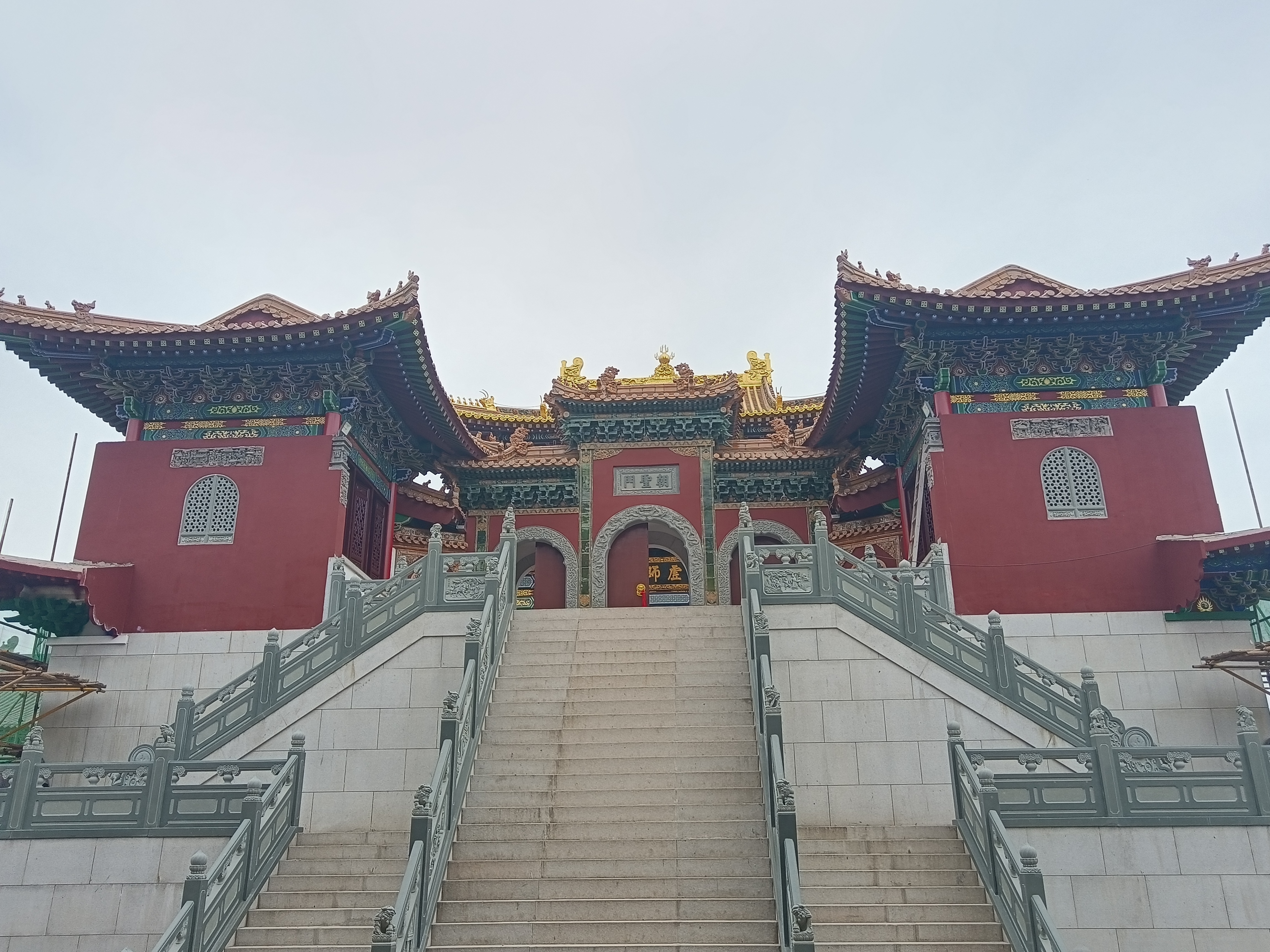
Chaosheng Gate

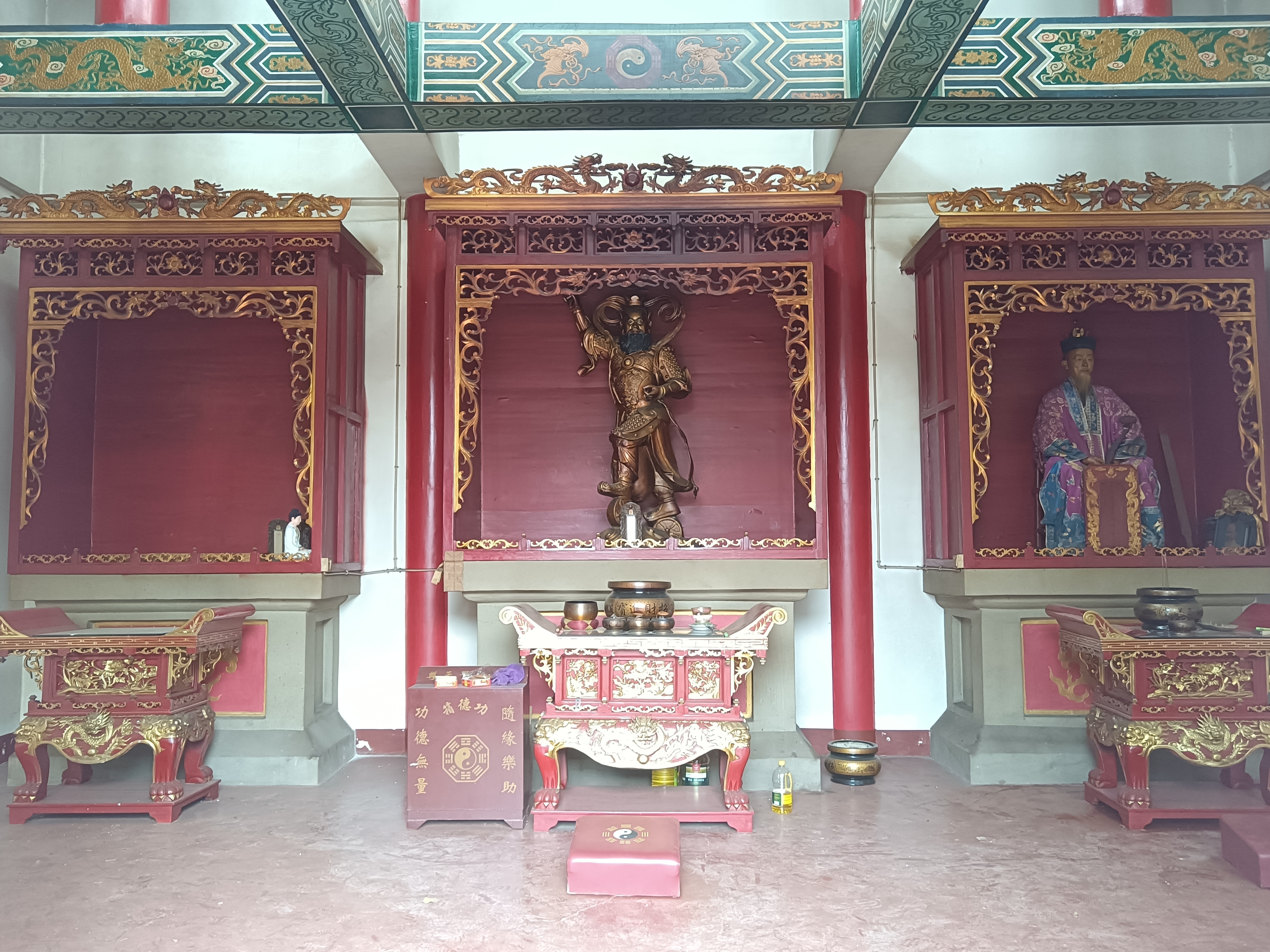
Lingguan Hall

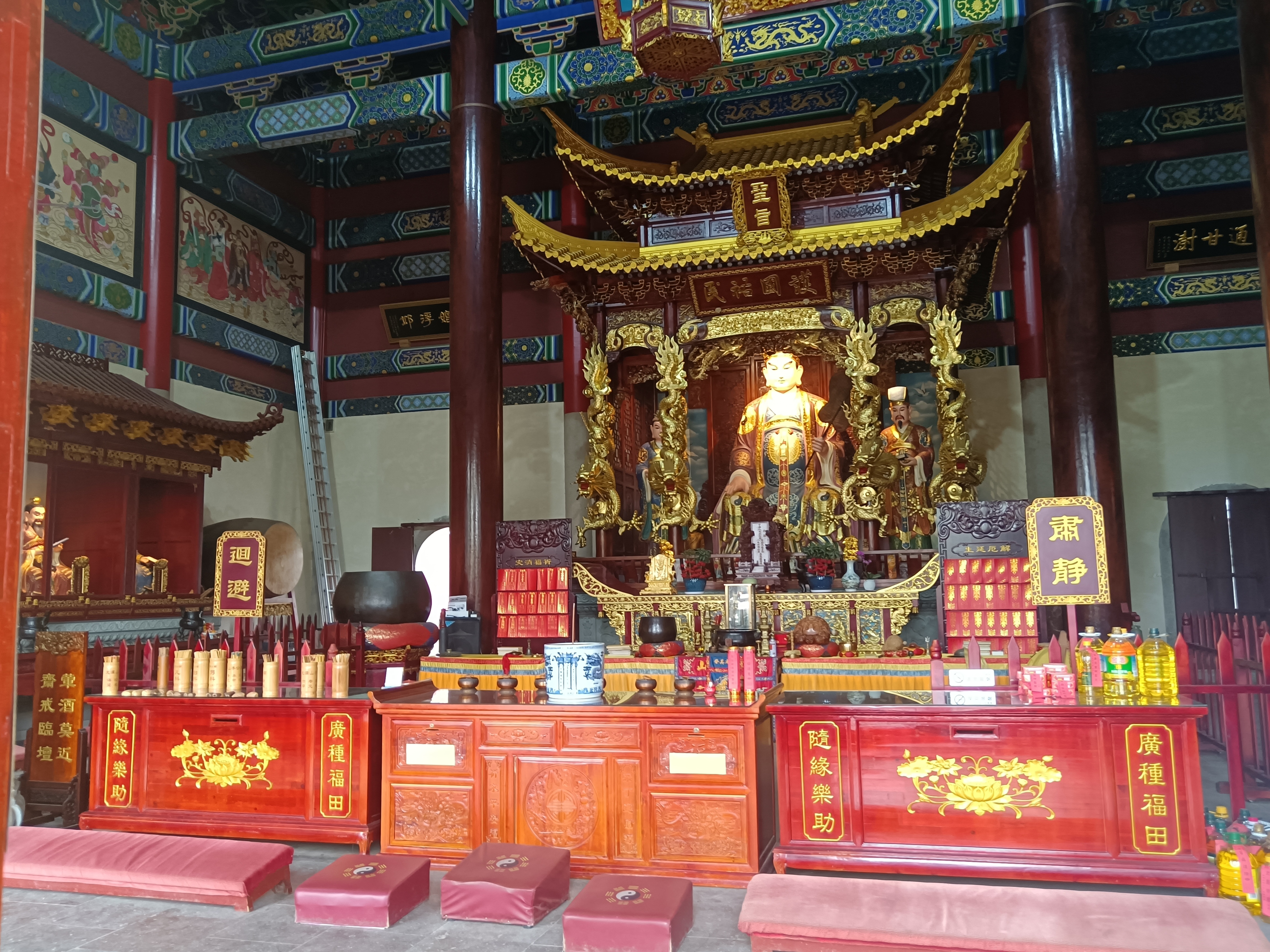
Zhenren Hall

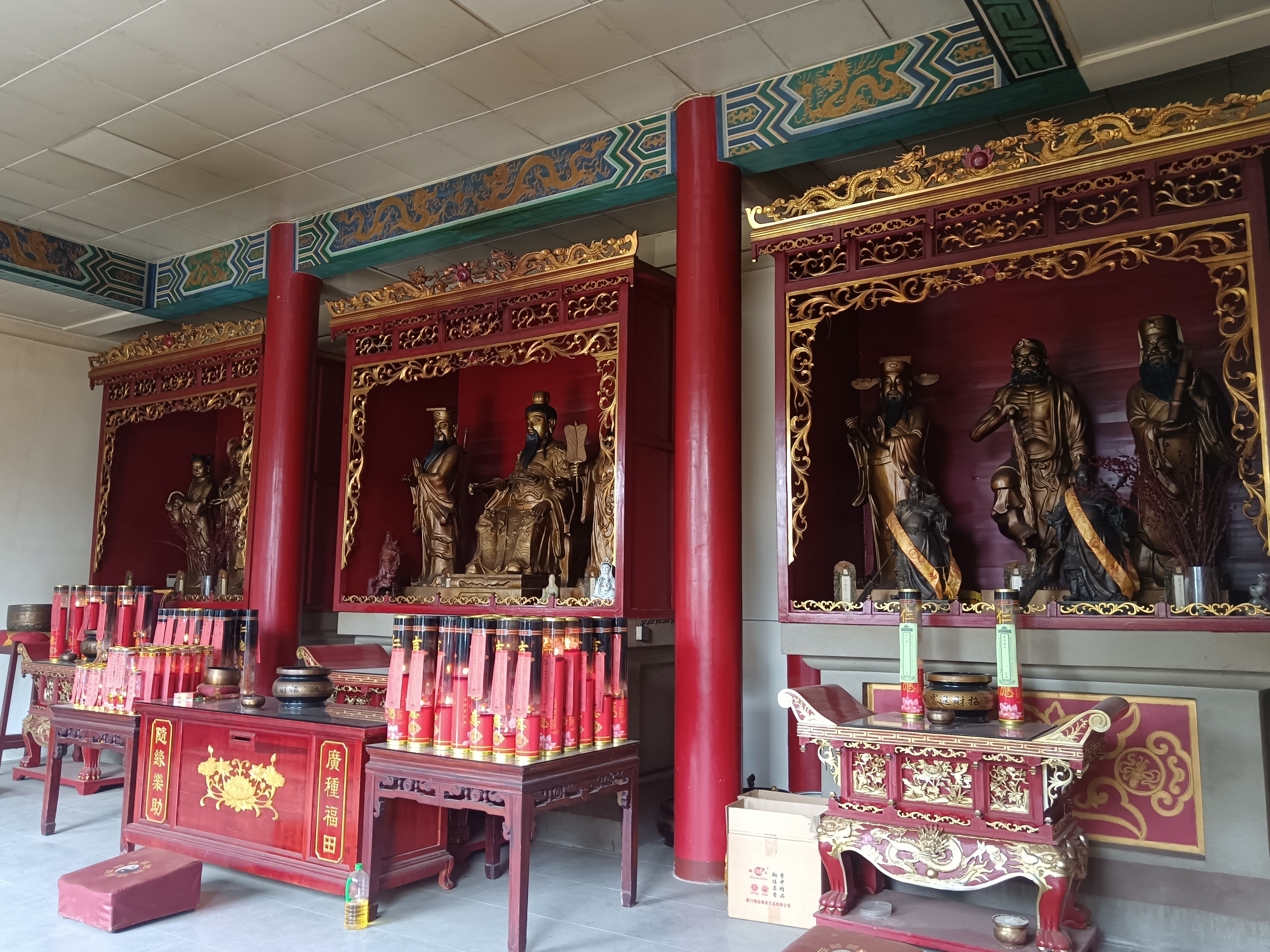
Eight Immortals Hall
