= Langli =

Langli may refer to:

== Places ==
- Langli (island), a small marsh island by the coast of Denmark
- Langli, Changsha, a subdistrict in Hunan, China
- Langli, Ukhrul, a village in Manipur, India
- John Christian Langli (born 1961), a Norwegian economist
- Terje Langli (born 1965), Norwegian cross country skier

== Stations ==
- Langli Station, a railway station in Langli, Ski, Norway
- Langli station (Changsha Maglev), a Changsha Maglev Express station, China

== See also ==
- Langley (disambiguation)
