= Laodao River =

River in Hunan, China

Coordinates: 28°26′00″N 113°32′42″E

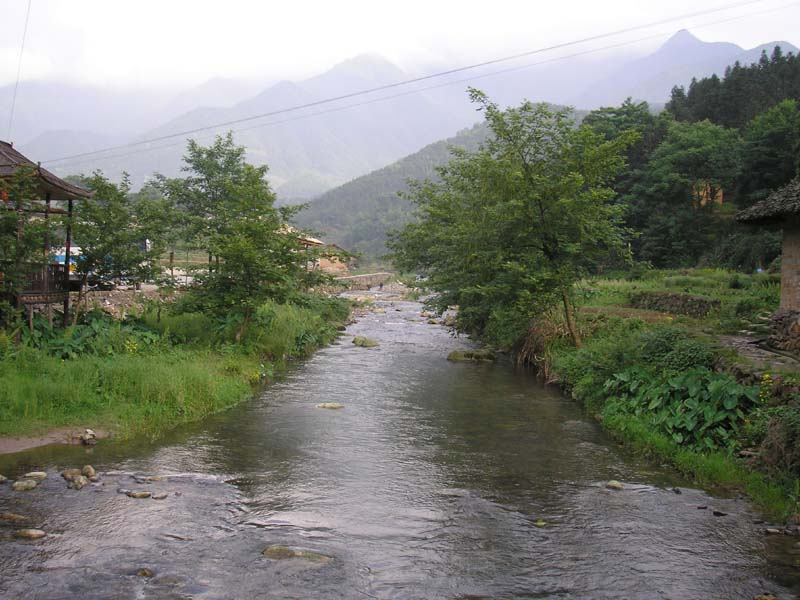
Laodao River flows from its source in Shegang Town of Liuyang.

The Laodao River (Chinese: 捞刀河; pinyin: Lāodāo hé), also known as the Laotang River (Chinese: 捞塘河; pinyin: Lāodāo hé) or Liaoxu River (Chinese: 潦浒河; pinyin: liáoxǔ hé), is a right-bank tributary of the Xiang River, the 2nd largest tributary of Xiang River in Changsha, Hunan Province, China. The river has a length of 149.35 kilometres (92.80 mi) with its drainage area of 2,543 square kilometres (982 sq mi), accounting for 21.52% of the total area of Changsha, with surface water resources of 2,262 million cubic meters, accounting for 20.62% of that (as of 2014). It flows through Liuyang City, Changsha County, Furong and Kaifu Districts, and merges into Xiang River at Jiangwan (江湾) of Xiufeng Subdistrict, Kaifu District.

The River originates from Zhouluo Village (周洛) of Shegang Town in Liuyang, and flows through Longfu Township, Shashi Town, Beisheng Town, Yong'an Town, Chuanhua Town, and Huanghua Town to join the Xiang River at Yangyou Lake.
