= Changlong Subdistrict =

Changlong Subdistrict 长龙街道
- Subdistrict
- Interactive map of Changlong Subdistrict
- Country: People's Republic of China
- Province: Hunan
- Prefecture-level city: Changsha
- County: Changsha
- Established: September 28, 2012
- Seat: Xingfujiayuan

Area
  - Total: 29 km^{2} (11 sq mi)

Population (2012)
  - Total: 10,980
  - Density: 380/km^{2} (980/sq mi)

Changlong Subdistrict (simplified Chinese: 长龙街道; traditional Chinese: 長龍街道; pinyin: Chánglóng jiēdào) is a subdistrict in Changsha County, Hunan Province, China. It was formed on September 28, 2012 from parts of Huanghua Town. The subdistrict is surrounded by Huanghua to the north, the east and the south, adjacent to Xingsha Subdistrict in the west. Changlong has an area of 29 km^{2} (11 sq mi), with a census registered population of 10,980 as of 2012. Changlong Subdistrict is divided into three villages and two communities. Its administrative centre is Xingfujiayuan (幸福家园).
