= Ansha =

Ansha may refer to:

== Chinese towns ==
- Ansha, Yong'an (安砂镇), a town of Yong'an city in Fujian province
- Ansha, Changsha (安沙镇), a town of Changsha County in Hunan province

== Other uses ==
- Ansha (footballer), Indian footballer
