= Changsha Economic and Technological Development Zone =

Chinese economic and technical development zone

Changsha Economic and Technological Development Zone (CETZ) (simplified Chinese: 长沙经济技术开发区; traditional Chinese: 長沙經濟技術開發區; pinyin: Chángshā Jīngjì Jìshù Kāifāqū) is an economic and technical development zone at state level in Changsha, Hunan, China. The zone was established in August 1992, its old name was Xingsha Development Zone of Changsha (长沙星沙开发区), changed to the present name on 29 March, 1994. CETZ was upgraded to an economic and technical development zone at state-level in February, 2000. The headquarters for CETZ is situated in Xingsha in the eastern suburb of Changsha, including Xingsha, Langli and Huanghua 3 Industrial parks, its planning area covers 105 km^{2} (41 sq mi).

The zone attracts many foreign investments, such as Mitsubishi Motor, NEC, Bosch, Philips, LG, HEG, Coca-Cola and Pepsi. Major industries in the zone include machinery processing and manufacturing, electronics and information, building materials, food and beverage, and printing.

== Link ==
- Changsha Economic and Technological Development Zone
