= Songya Lake National Wetland Park =

Park in Hunan, China

- 松雅湖国家湿地公园
- Location within Hunan
- Type: Public park
- Location: Changsha County, Hunan, China
- Coordinates: 28°16′N 113°07′E
- Area: 3.65-square-kilometre (1.41 sq mi)
- Created: 2016
- Status: Open all year

Chinese name
- Simplified Chinese: 松雅湖国家湿地公园
- Traditional Chinese: 松雅湖國家濕地公園
Transcriptions
Standard Mandarin
- Hanyu Pinyin: Sōngyǎ Hú Guójiā Shīdì Gōngyuán

Songya Lake National Wetland Park is a national wetland park located in Changsha County, Hunan, China. It is celebrated for its ecological significance and scenic beauty, serving as a key example of successful "returning farmland to lake" restoration efforts in China.

== History ==
The area now known as Songya Lake was originally part of the old river course of the Laodao River, characterized by low-lying wetlands. In 1973, during a wave of land reclamation campaigns around Dongting Lake, the Red Bayberry Lake area (杨梅湖; 楊梅湖; Yángméi Hú) was transformed into Tuanjieyuan (团结垸; 団結垸; Tuánjiēyuǎn), an agricultural polder.

A significant transition began in 2003 when the "Returning Farmland to Lake" project was initiated for Tuanjieyuan, approved by the Hunan Provincial People's Government. Major construction started in 2008. The area was successfully impounded with water for the first time in December 2009, formally creating Songya Lake, with complete water storage achieved by December 2010. After a period of pilot development, the park was officially designated as a National Wetland Park in 2016.

== Geography ==
=== Geology ===
Songya Lake National Wetland Park is a classic example of a restored shallow-water lake wetland ecosystem. Its landscape includes lakes, marshlands, artificial isles, and lakeside ecological zones. The transformation of this area is profound: from just 0.0074-square-kilometre (0.0029 sq mi) of water in 1955 (when it was primarily rice paddies), it grew to a permanent lake covering 2.744-square-kilometre (1.059 sq mi) after the restoration project.

=== Songya Lake ===
Songya Lake itself covers over 4 square kilometres (1.5 sq mi) of water surface. It plays a crucial role in regional water management, significantly enhancing flood control capacity for the Changsha County area from a 10-year standard to a 100-year standard. The lake's water quality is consistently maintained at Class III standards for surface water.

=== Climate ===
Songya Lake National Wetland Park is located in a subtropical monsoon climate zone.

== Biodiversity ==
Songya Lake National Wetland Park is a hub of biodiversity, with a wetland vegetation coverage of 90.06%.

=== Flora ===
Songya Lake National Wetland Park is home to a rich variety of plant life, with records of 216 plant species. These include nationally protected plants like the Metasequoia and Ginkgo. Seasonal displays of roses, lotus flowers, and cattails create a vibrant and changing landscape throughout the year.

=== Fauna ===
Songya Lake National Wetland Park provides a habitat for a diverse array of wildlife, with 117 species of vertebrates recorded. It is particularly important for birds, with monitoring identifying 194 bird species. Several endangered species in the park, such as: Oriental stork, Scaly-sided merganser, Great crested grebe.

== Main Attractions ==
Following a recent comprehensive upgrade, Songya Lake National Wetland Park now features eight distinct functional zones, each offering a unique experience:

- Friendship Forest Urban Waterfront Zone (友谊林都市滨湖区; 友誼林都市濱湖區; Yǒuyìlín Dūshì Bīnhú Qū): includes an international friendship forest, a wetland tea house, and a reading space.
- Green Around the Shoal Wetland Culture Zone (绿绕洲滩湿地文化区; 綠繞洲灘濕地文化區; Lǜrào Zhōutān Shīdì Wénhuà Qū): showcases a pristine wetland ecosystem with aquatic plants like water lilies and reeds for visitors to observe.
- Wetland Scenery Experience Zone (湿地风情体验区; 濕地風情體驗區; Shīdì Fēngqíng Tǐyàn Qū): offers a vast space to immerse in the natural wetland environment.
- Health Experience Zone (健康体验区; 健康體驗區; Jiànkāng Tǐyàn Qū): features a crescent-shaped lakeside beach approximately 600-metre (2,000 ft) long, alongside tennis courts, basketball courts, and activity areas for all ages.
- Happy Forest History and Culture Zone (幸福林历史文化区; 幸福林歷史文化區; Xìngfúlín Lìshǐ Wénhuà Qū): integrates the history and culture of the Chu region with attractions like the Guan Yu Square and spots for enjoying lotus flowers.
- Cultural and Creative Exhibition Zone (文化创意展示区; 文化創意展示區; Wénhuà Chuàngyì Zhǎnshì Qū): offers a dynamic space with a waterfront promenade, Chu Silk Square, and the Weekend Theater.
- Comprehensive Tourist Service Zone (游客综合服务区; 遊客綜合服務區; Yóukè Zōnghé Fúwù Qū): serves as the main hub for visitor services and distribution.
- Fragrant Isle Songya Academy Zone (香岛松雅禅院区; 香島松雅禪院區; Xiāngdǎo Sōngyǎ Chányuàn Qū): comprises two isles intended to be a highlight of the park.

Songya Lake National Wetland Park also boasts 9-square-kilometre (3.5 sq mi)waterfront walking path and a 10-square-kilometre (3.9 sq mi) lakeside greenway, perfect for walking, running, and cycling.

== Transportation ==
The most convenient way to reach the park by public transport is via the Changsha Metro Line 3. The nearest station is Songya Lake (South) station.
