= Fulin, Changsha =

Fulin 福临镇
- town
- Location in Hunan
- Coordinates: 28°31′47″N 113°14′08″E
- Country: China
- Province: Hunan
- Prefecture-level city: Changsha
- County: Changsha

Area
  - Total: 82.9 km^{2} (32.0 sq mi)
- Elevation: 78 m (256 ft)

Population (2000)
  - Total: 27,215
  - Density: 328/km^{2} (850/sq mi)
- Time zone: UTC+8 (China Standard)

Fulin (simplified Chinese: 福临镇; traditional Chinese: 福臨鎮; pinyin: Fúlín Zhèn) is a town located in Changsha County, in the northeastern part of Hunan Province, China. The town covers an area of 82.9 square kilometers and had a population of 27,215 as of the 2000 census. Administratively, Fulin oversees one community, Fulinpu Community, and ten villages.

== Geography ==
Fulin is situated in the central-western part of Changsha County, bordering Kaifu Township and Baisha Township to the north, Gaoqiao Town to the east, Qingshanpu Town and Lukou Town to the south, and Bishi Town of Miluo City to the west.
