= Shegang, Liuyang =

Shegang 社港镇
- Town
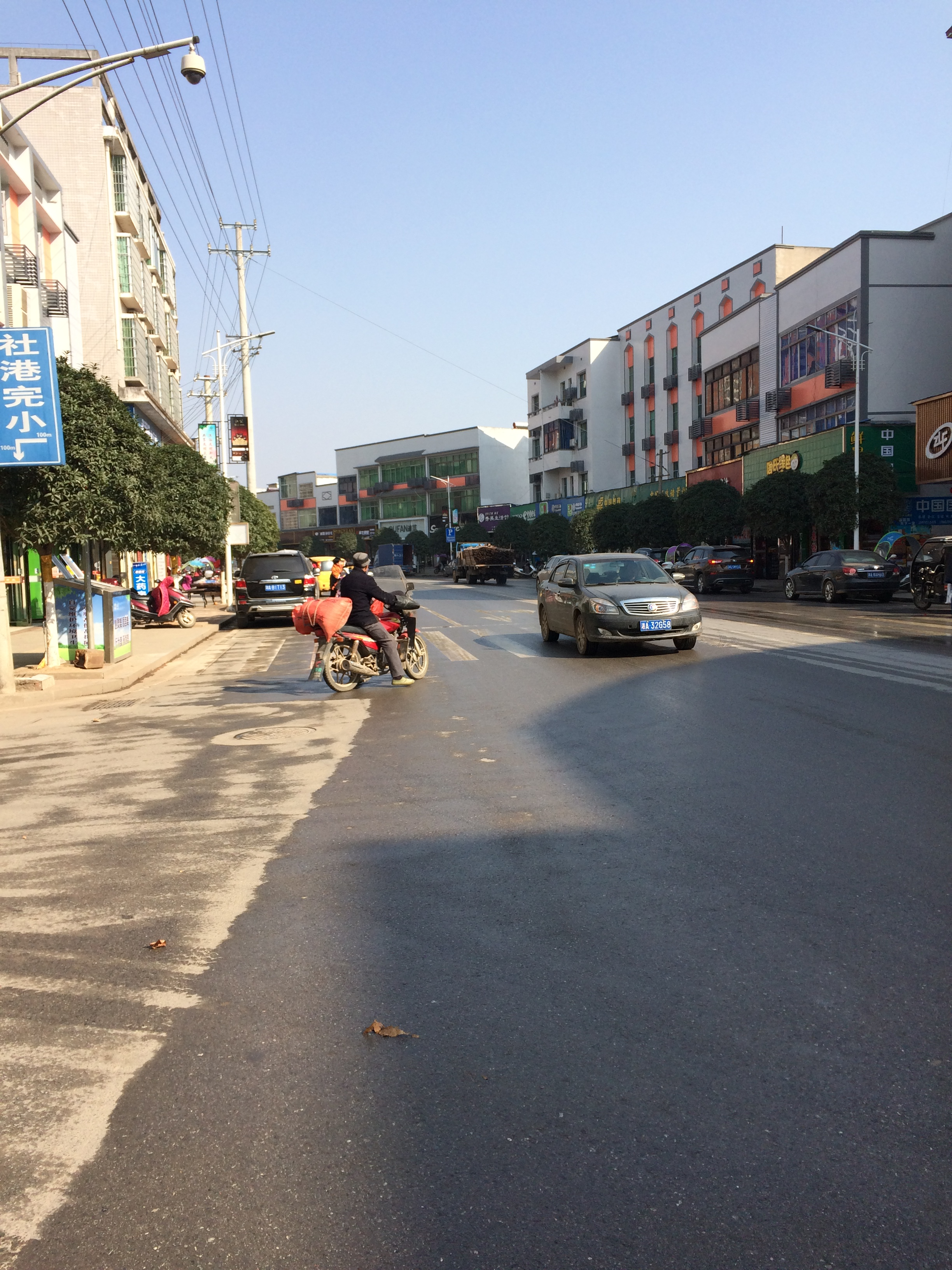
- Residential buildings on both sides of the road in Shegang Town in December 2017.

- Location in Hunan
- Coordinates: 28°28′20″N 113°33′19″E
- Country: People's Republic of China
- Province: Hunan
- Prefecture-level city: Changsha
- County-level city: Liuyang

Area
  - Total: 175 km^{2} (68 sq mi)

Population (2016)
  - Total: 46,900
  - Density: 268/km^{2} (694/sq mi)
- Time zone: UTC+8 (China Standard)
- Postal code: 410327
- Area code: 0731

Shegang Town (simplified Chinese: 社港镇; traditional Chinese: 社港鎮; pinyin: Shègǎng Zhèn) is an urban town in Liuyang, Hunan, People's Republic of China. As of the 2016 census it had a population of 46,900 and an area of 175 square kilometres (68 sq mi). Shegang borders Pingjiang County and Changsha County in the north and northeast, Gugang in the east and southeast, and Longfu and Shashi in the southwest.

== Administrative divisions ==
The town is divided into 13 villages and three communities, which include the following areas: Zhenbei Community, Shegang Community, Xinguang Community, Zhouluo Village, Qingyuan Village, Liubei Village, Yongxing Village, Longhua Village, Huiyuan Village, Yuantian Village, Qingjiang Village, Hesheng Village, Danxia Village, Huaizhou Village, Shiniu Village, and Gaoshou Village (镇北社区、社港社区和新光社区，周洛村、清源村、浏北村、永兴村、龙华村、汇源村、源田村、清江村、合盛村、丹霞村、淮洲村、石牛村和高寿村).

== Geography ==
The Liuyang River, a tributary of the Xiang River, it flows through the town.

The Guanshan Reservoir (Chinese: 关山水库) is the largest body of water in the town.

The Mount Longtoujian (Chinese: 龙头尖; a height of 653.9 metres (2,145 ft)) and Mount Shantoujian (Chinese: 山头尖; a height of 351 metres (1,152 ft)) are mountains in the town.

== Education ==
Shegang Meddle School.

== Transportation ==
- Pingru Expressway (Chinese: 平汝高速公路)
- National Highway G106

== Attractions ==
Zhouluo Scenic Spot (Chinese: 周洛风景区) and Zhouluo Drifting (Chinese: 周洛漂流) are tourist attractions in the town.
