= Xianglong (disambiguation) =

Xianglong may refer to:

- Xianglong, a genus of Cretaceous period lizards.
- Guizhao Xianglong, Chinese unmanned aerial vehicle concept.
- Xianglong Subdistrict, subdistrict in the Hunan Province of the People's Republic of China.
- Dai Xianglong
