= Taogong Palace =

Taoist temple in Hunan, China

- 陶公庙
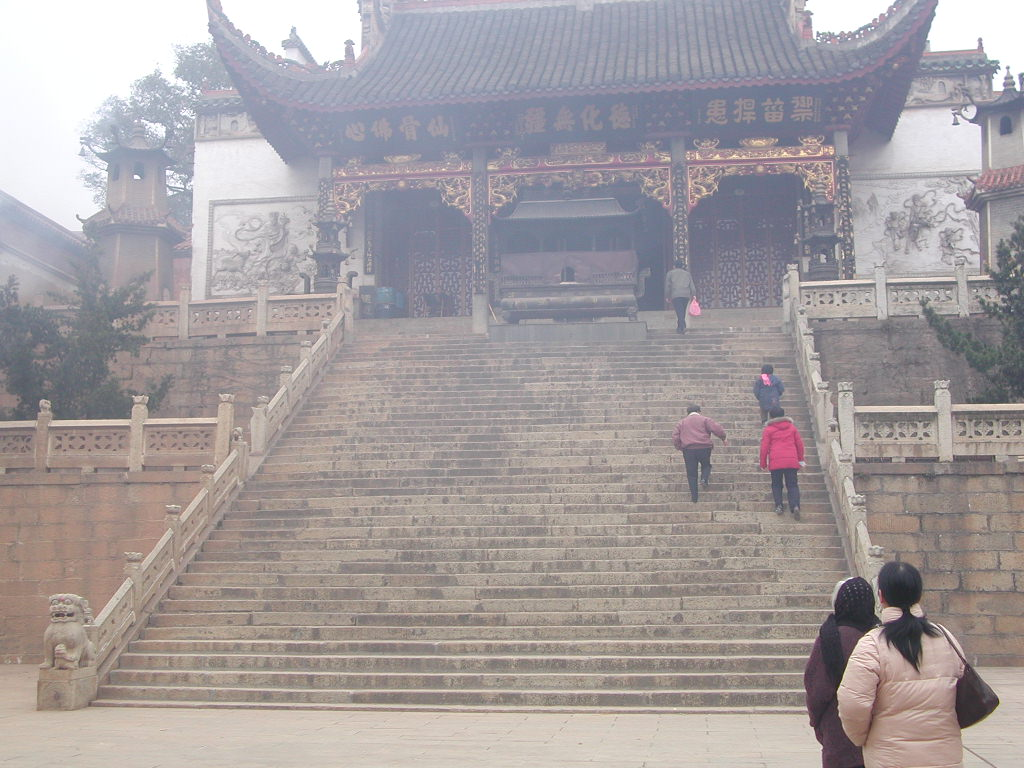
- The Main Hall of Taogong Palace.

- Location within Hunan Location within China

Religion
- Sect: Taoism
- District: Langli Subdistrict, Changsha County
- Province: Hunan

Location
- Country: China
- Interactive map of Taogong Palace
- Coordinates: 28°11′12.282″N 113°7′4.728″E

Architecture
- Founder: Tao Dan (陶淡)
- Established: AD 504

Taogong Palace (simplified Chinese: 陶公庙; traditional Chinese: 陶公廟; pinyin: Táogōngmiào; lit. 'Palace of Lord Tao') is a Taoist temple located on the west side of Linxiang Hill (临湘山), beside the Liuyang River, in Langli Subdistrict, Changsha County, Hunan, China. The temple covers a total area of 7,333.333 square metres (78,935.34 sq ft), with more than 1,852 square metres (19,930 sq ft) of floor space.

== Etymology ==
The name 陶公庙; 陶公廟; Táo Gōng Miào, Tao is a common Chinese surname, and 公; gōng, an honorific title meaning "venerable", "lord" or "revered elder". Thus, Taogong Palace is dedicated primary to the memory and veneration of Tao Kan (259–334), a prominent general, governor, and statesman of the Eastern Jin dynasty (317–420). It also honors his grandson Tao Dan, who was similarly respected for his piety and loyalty. This reflects a traditional Chinese practice of venerating exemplary familial lineages.

== History ==
In honor of Tao Kan, Taogong Palace was first built by his grandson Tao Dan in 504, in the 3rd Year of Period Tianjian (502–519) in Liang dynasty (502–587).

The temple was badly damaged during the Cultural Revolution and almost all of plaques which written by historical famous people were either removed, vandalized or destroyed. In 1988, the temple was restored by the municipal government. Then an extensive renovations began in 1994. It has been designated as a "provincial level key cultural heritage" in 1996.

The eldest things in the temple is a 1000-year-old camphor tree.

== Architecture ==
The temple includes the following halls: Shanmen, Operatower, Stone steps, Main Hall and Side Palace Hall.

=== Main Hall ===
The Main Hall are generally two-room buildings (the front hall and the back hall) at the central axis of temples in the highest point of the temple. Tan Kan and Guan Yin are enshrined in the front hall and the back hall respectively. Its surface paved by granite stones. A plaque which was written by Zhu Xi on the Main Hall. It reads "德化无疆" in Chinese.

== Transportation ==
- Take bus No. 169 to Shaoguang Community Bus Stop (韶光社区站)
- Take bus Xingsha 103 to Xingsha No. 2 Hospital Bus Stop (星沙二医院站)
