= Langli station =

Langli station may refer to:

- Langli Station, a railway station in Langli, Ski, Norway
- Langli station (Changsha Maglev), a Changsha Maglev Express station, China
