= Changsha Maglev Express =

Maglev train in Hunan province, China

Coordinates: 28.1699°N 113.1491°E

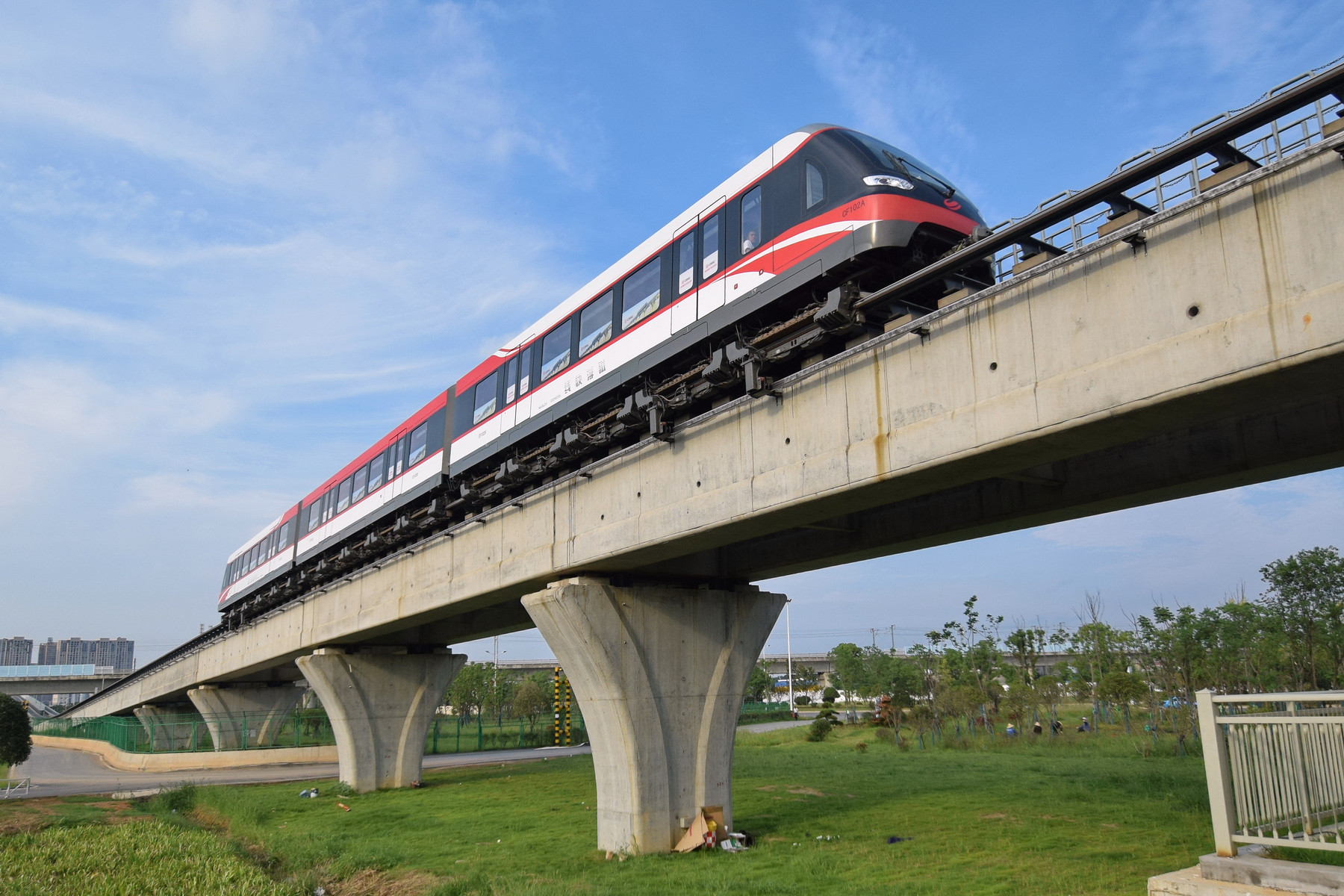
- Changsha Maglev Train arriving at Langli Station

Overview
- Native name: Chinese: 长沙磁浮快线
- Transit type: Magnetic levitation
- Number of lines: 1
- Number of stations: Initially 3, planned for 5
- Daily ridership: 8,299 (2017 avg.); 12,759 (record)

Operation
- Began operation: 6 May 2016; 10 years ago
- Operators: Hunan Maglev Transportation Development Co., Ltd.

Technical
- System length: 18.55 km (11.53 mi)
- Average speed: 57 km/h (35 mph) (Including stops)
- Top speed: 100 km/h (62 mph)

The Changsha Maglev Express (simplified Chinese: 长沙磁浮快线; traditional Chinese: 長沙磁浮快線; pinyin: Chángshā cífú kuàixiàn), also known as Line S2, is a medium-low speed magnetic levitation, or maglev line in Changsha, China. This is China's second maglev line, after Shanghai Maglev, and the first domestically built maglev line, which uses indigenous technology. The line stretches over 18.55 kilometers (11.53 mi) and runs between Changsha Huanghua International Airport, Langli station and the high-speed railway station Changsha South railway station.

The original rolling stock was designed for a speed of up to 120 km/h (75 mph) but operated with a maximum speed of 100 km/h (62 mph). In July 2021 the new model entered service operating at a top speed of 140 km/h (87 mph), which reduced the travel time by three minutes.

== History ==
Construction started in May 2014, trial running on 26 December 2015, and finally start trial operations on 6 May 2016. Since the beginning of construction in May 2014, the project has received an estimated investment of 4.6 billion yuan ($749 million).

A 4.5 km (2.8 mi) extension of the line is currently under construction, to connect to the under construction Terminal 3 on the east side of the airport. The extension will be elevated for 0.2 km (0.12 mi) and underground for 4.3 km (2.7 mi). Two underground stations are planned for the extension. Construction started on 25 April 2021.

== Opening timeline ==
Segment	Commencement	Length	Station(s)	Name
Changshanan — Huanghua Airport	6 May 2016	18.55 km (11.53 mi)	3	Initial section
T2 & T3	2025 (Under construction)	4.454 km (2.77 mi)	2	East extension

== Stations ==
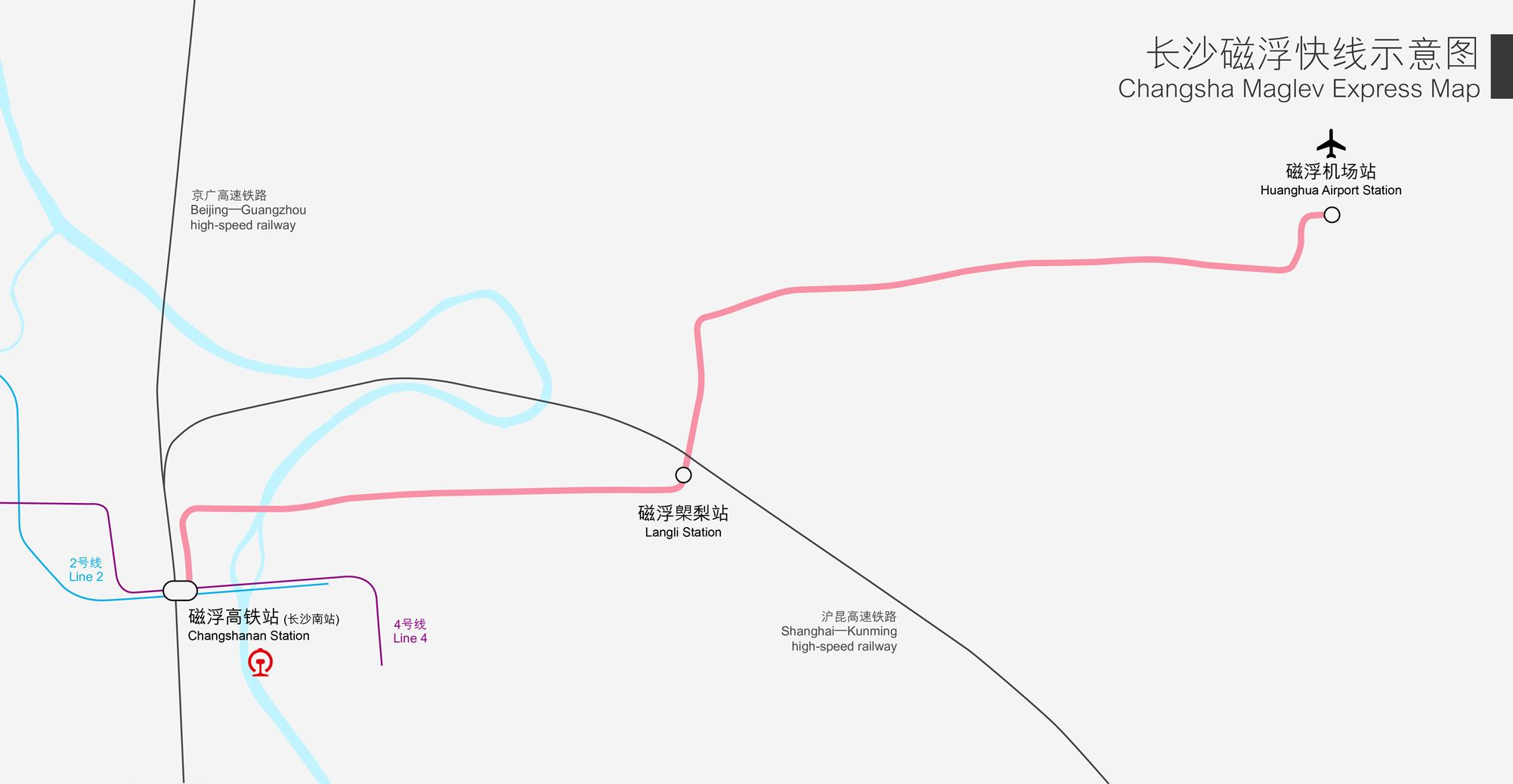
Map of Changsha Maglev Express

Station name		Connections	Distance km	Location
English	Chinese	Connections	Distance km	Location
Changshanan	磁浮高铁站	2 4 CWQ	0.00	Yuhua
Langli	磁浮㮾梨		7.55	Changsha County
Huanghua Airport	磁浮机场	6 (via Huanghua Airport T1 & T2 station); CSX	18.55	Changsha County
T2 (U/C)	磁浮T2			Changsha County
T3 (U/C)	磁浮T3			Changsha County

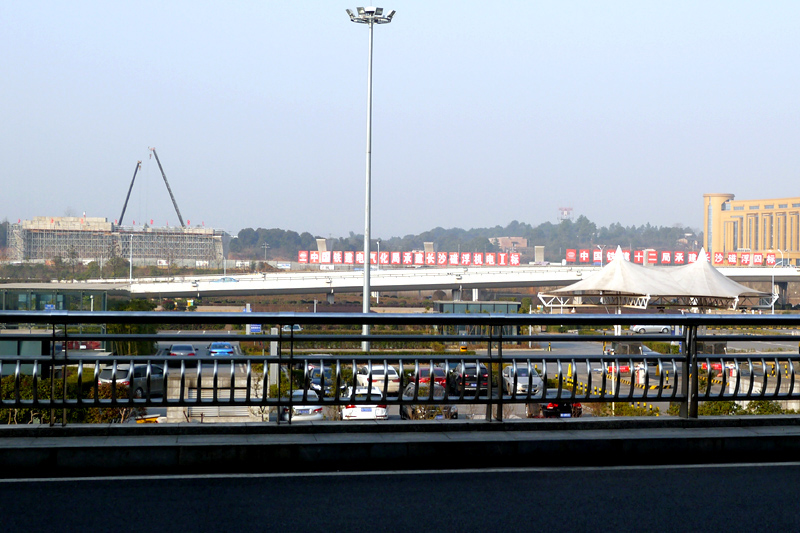
Maglev track under construction in front of Changsha Huanghua International Airport (2015)

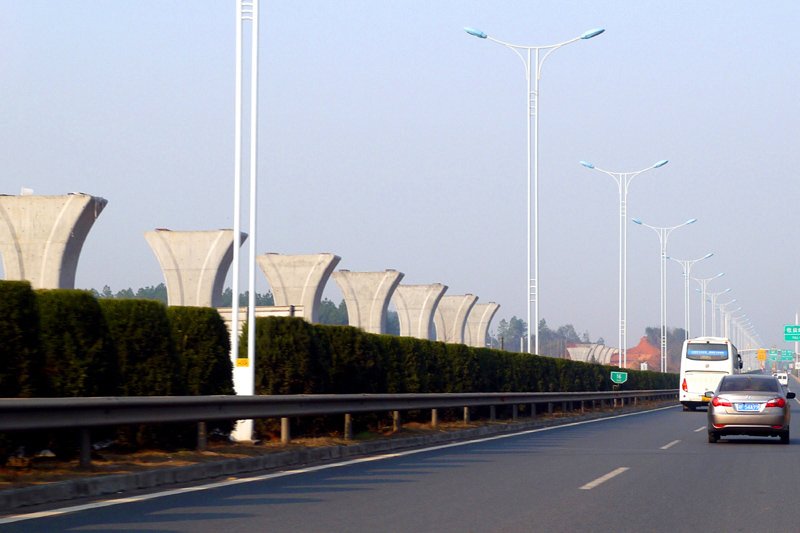
Maglev track under construction along the airport highway (2015)

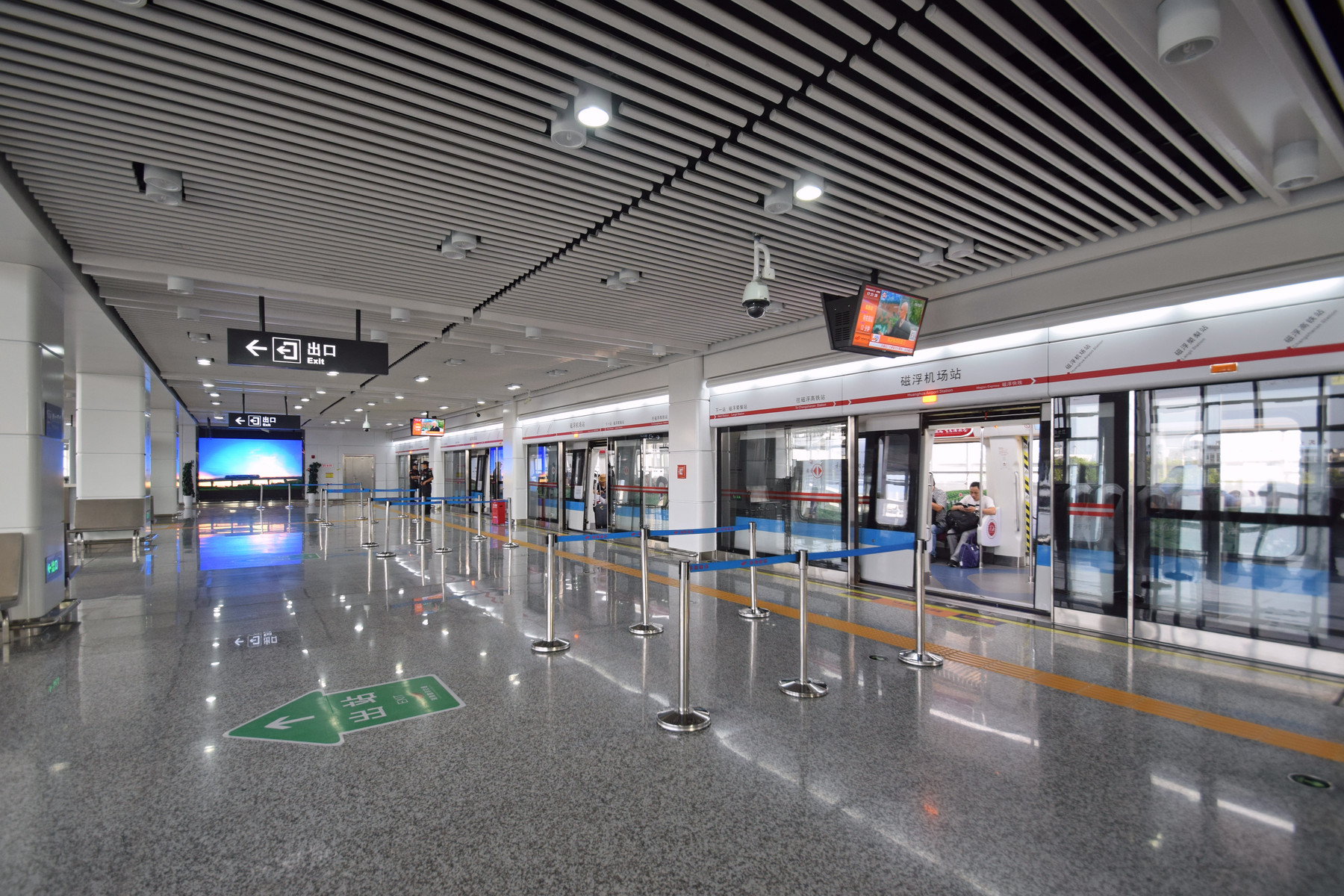
Platform of Huanghua Airport Station (2016)

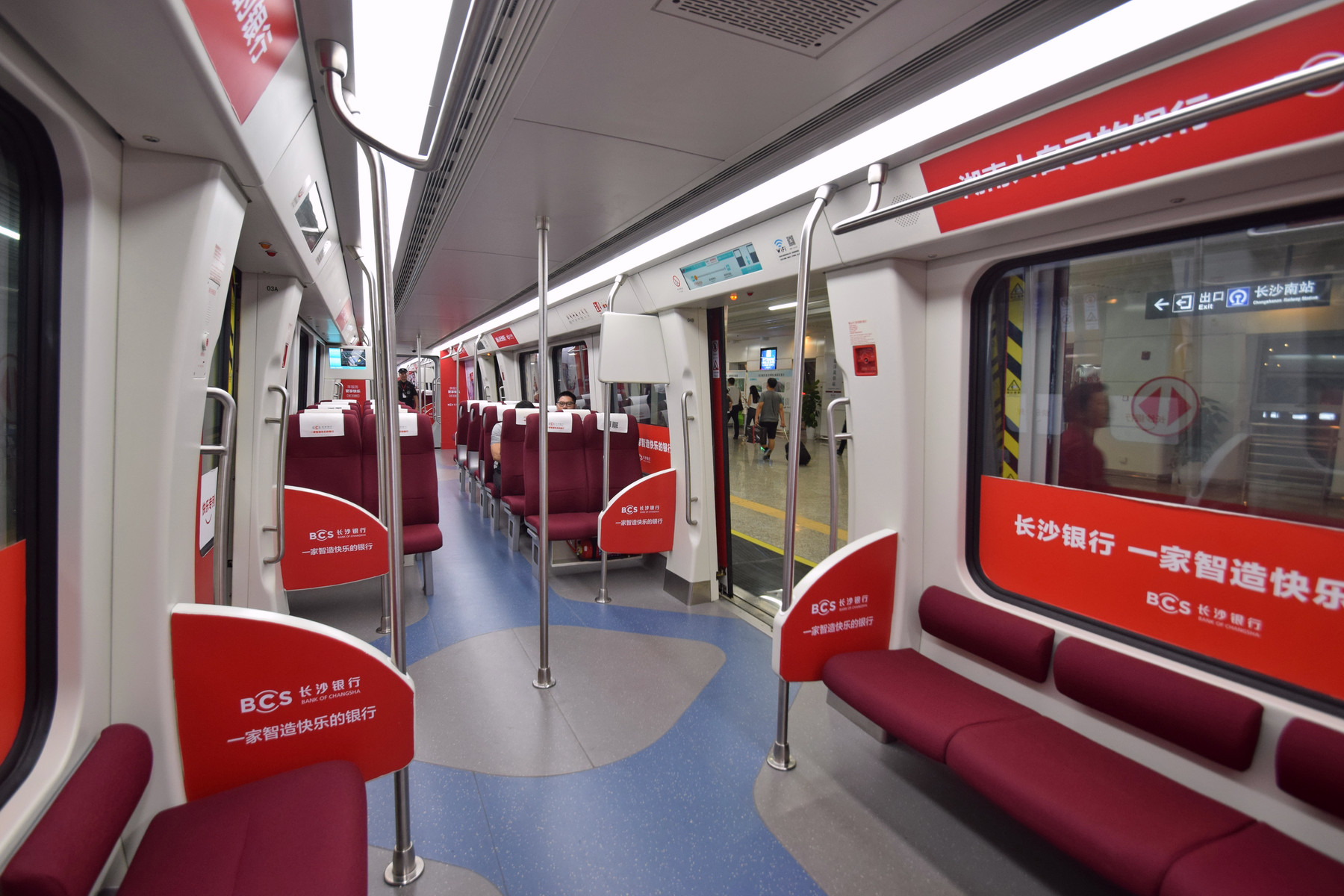
Interior of Changsha Maglev train (2016)

== Operating hours ==
The first train departs from Huanghua Airport station or Changsha South railway station at 7:00am. The last train leaves Changsha South railway station at 10:00pm or Huanghua Airport station at 10:30pm. The current service interval is 11 minutes 40 seconds and each train completes the whole journey in 19 minutes 30 seconds.
