= Lukou =

Lukou may refer to the following locations in China:

== District ==
- Lukou District (渌口区), Hunan

== Towns ==
- Lukou, Yingshang County (鲁口镇), Anhui
- Lukou, Zhuzhou (渌口镇), Hunan

Written as "路口镇":

- Lukou, Chongyang County, in Chongyang County, Hubei
- Lukou, Huangzhou District, in Huanggang, Hubei
- Lukou, Changsha County, Hunan
- Lukou, Yueyang, in Yunxi District, Yueyang, Hunan
- Lukou, Lianhua County, in Lianhua County, Jiangxi

== Townships (路口乡) ==
- Lukou Township, Xi County, Henan
- Lukou Township, Xiushui County, in Xiushui County, Jiangxi
