= Jiangbei, Changsha =

Jiangbei Town 江背镇
- Town
- Location in Hunan
- Coordinates: 28.1172°N 113.3565°E
- Country: China
- Province: Hunan
- Prefecture-level city: Changsha
- County: Changsha

Area
  - Total: 175 km^{2} (68 sq mi)

Population (2000 census)
  - Total: 53,997
  - Density: 309/km^{2} (799/sq mi)
- Time zone: UTC+8 (China Standard)

Jiangbei Town (simplified Chinese: 江背镇; traditional Chinese: 江背鎮; pinyin: Jiāngbèi Zhèn) is a town in Changsha County, Changsha, Hunan province, China. It administers three communities and thirteen villages.

== Tourist attractions ==
The Former Residence of Xu Teli is a popular attraction.
