= Longfu, Liuyang =

Longfu Town 龙伏镇
- Town
- Location in Hunan
- Coordinates: 28°25′55″N 113°31′14″E
- Country: People's Republic of China
- Province: Hunan
- Prefecture-level city: Changsha
- County-level city: Liuyang

Area
  - Total: 132.7 km^{2} (51.2 sq mi)

Population
  - Total: 46,600
  - Density: 351/km^{2} (910/sq mi)
- Time zone: UTC+8 (China Standard)
- Postal code: 410327
- Area code: 0731

Longfu Town (simplified Chinese: 龙伏镇; traditional Chinese: 龍伏鎮; pinyin: Lóngfú Zhèn) is an urban town in Liuyang City, Hunan Province, People's Republic of China. As of the 2016 census it had a population of 46,600 and an area of 132.7 square kilometres (51.2 sq mi). It borders Shegang Town in the east and northeast, Shashi Town in the west and northwest, and Chunkou Town in the south.

== History ==
Longfu is situated on the bank of Laodao River of Liuyang city. Longfu has a long history and is rich in historic and cultural remains and heritage. A quite complete ancient village pattern has been well preserved. The Xinkai Village (新开村) has the largest number of ancient folk houses in Changsha-Zhuzhou-Xiangtan area. Many intangible cultural heritages like Weigu (围鼓), Yege (夜歌) and Shujia (耍架) have distinctive local features. The Xinkai Village was rated as a "Historic and Cultural Village of Hunan" in 2005.

== Administrative divisions ==
The town is divided into 10 villages and two communities, which include the following areas: Longfu Community, Banchun Community, Xinkai Village, Huangqiao Village, Dafeng Village, Jiaoqiao Village, Pingshang Village, Xiangshi Village, Zhezhuang Village, Shangbu Village, Shijiang Village, and Shizhufeng Village (龙伏社区和泮春社区，新开村、黄桥村、达峰村、焦桥村、坪上村、相市村、柘庄村、尚埠村、石江村和石柱峰村).

== Geography ==
The Shizhu Peak (石柱峰) is the highest mountain in the town, with a height of 1,359.7 metres (4,461 ft).

== Education ==
- Longfu Meddle School

== Transportation ==
- National Highway G106
- Liuli Expressway

== Attractions ==
The existing folk houses left by the Qing dynasty (1644–1912) and the Republican period (1912-1949) cover about 20,000 square metres (220,000 sq ft), of which Shen's House (沈家大屋) is a provincial-level cultural relic protection unit.

The Dajiang Dam (大江坝), which was the first dam of Laodao River, built throughout the Xianfeng (1851-1861), Tongzhi (1862-1874) and Guangxu (1875-1908) periods of the Qing dynasty (1644-1912), and the ancient ditches have also been well preserved.

The Former Residence of Jiao Dafeng, the Site of Peiwen Tower (培文塔遗址) and Shizhu Peak Scenic Spot (石柱峰景区) are famous sightseeing spots.

== Celebrity ==
- Jiao Dafeng (1886-1911), revolutionary martyr.
- Zhou Qifeng, former president of Peking University.
- Shen Rengan, former deputy director of the State Copyright Bureau.
- Jiao Jiege, president of Hainan Medical University.
- Dai Deqing, secretary general of Xiangtan Government.
