= Jinjing =

Jinjing may refer to:

- Jinjing, Hunan, a town in Hunan, China
- Qin Jinjing (born 1996), China-born Australian badminton player
- Zhang Jinjing (born 1977), Chinese gymnast
