= Ole-Kristian Hope =

Norwegian economist

Ole-Kristian Hope (born c. 1965) is a Norwegian economist, and Professor of Accounting at the Rotman School of Management, particularly known for his work on accounting standards and disclosure practices.

== Biography ==
Hope obtained his Siviløkonom degree in 1988 from the Norwegian School of Economics, his MBA with High Distinction in 1991 from the University of Michigan. In 2002 he received his PhD in Accounting Information and Management at the Kellogg School of Management with a thesis entitled "A Study of International Variations in the Financial Reporting Environment, Disclosure Practices and Analysts' Forecasts."

After his graduation in Norway, Hope served in the Norwegian Air Force from 1988 to 1989. Back from the United States in 1991 he started working in industry as financial analyst for Norsk Hydro, and was auditor Coopers & Lybrand and CFO at McDonald's Norway. Back in the States in 1999 he started his academic career as lecturer at the Kellogg School of Management, and was Visiting Professor at the Helsinki School of Economics. In 2001 he joined the Rotman School of Management of the University of Toronto as Associate Professor and in 2007 was appointed Professor of Accounting.

Hope's research interests are in the broad field of "financial disclosure, financial reporting quality, corporate governance, analysts, valuation, auditing, private firms, corporate finance, and international business issues."

== Publications ==
Hope has authored and co-authored numerous publications in his field of expertise. Articles, A selection:

- Hope, Ole‐Kristian. "Disclosure practices, enforcement of accounting standards, and analysts' forecast accuracy: An international study." Journal of accounting research 41.2 (2003): 235-272.
- Hope, Ole‐Kristian. "Firm‐level disclosures and the relative roles of culture and legal origin." Journal of International Financial Management & Accounting 14.3 (2003): 218-248.
- Ding, Y., Hope, O. K., Jeanjean, T., & Stolowy, H. (2007). Differences between domestic accounting standards and IAS: Measurement, determinants and implications. Journal of Accounting and Public Policy, 26(1), 1-38.
- Hope, Ole-Kristian, and Wayne B. Thomas. "Managerial empire building and firm disclosure." Journal of Accounting Research 46.3 (2008): 591-626.
- Hope, Ole-Kristian, and John Christian Langli. "Auditor independence in a private firm and low litigation risk setting." The Accounting Review 85.2 (2010): 573-605.
