= Langli station (Changsha Maglev) =

Railway station in Changsha, China

Langli 磁浮㮾梨 Maglev
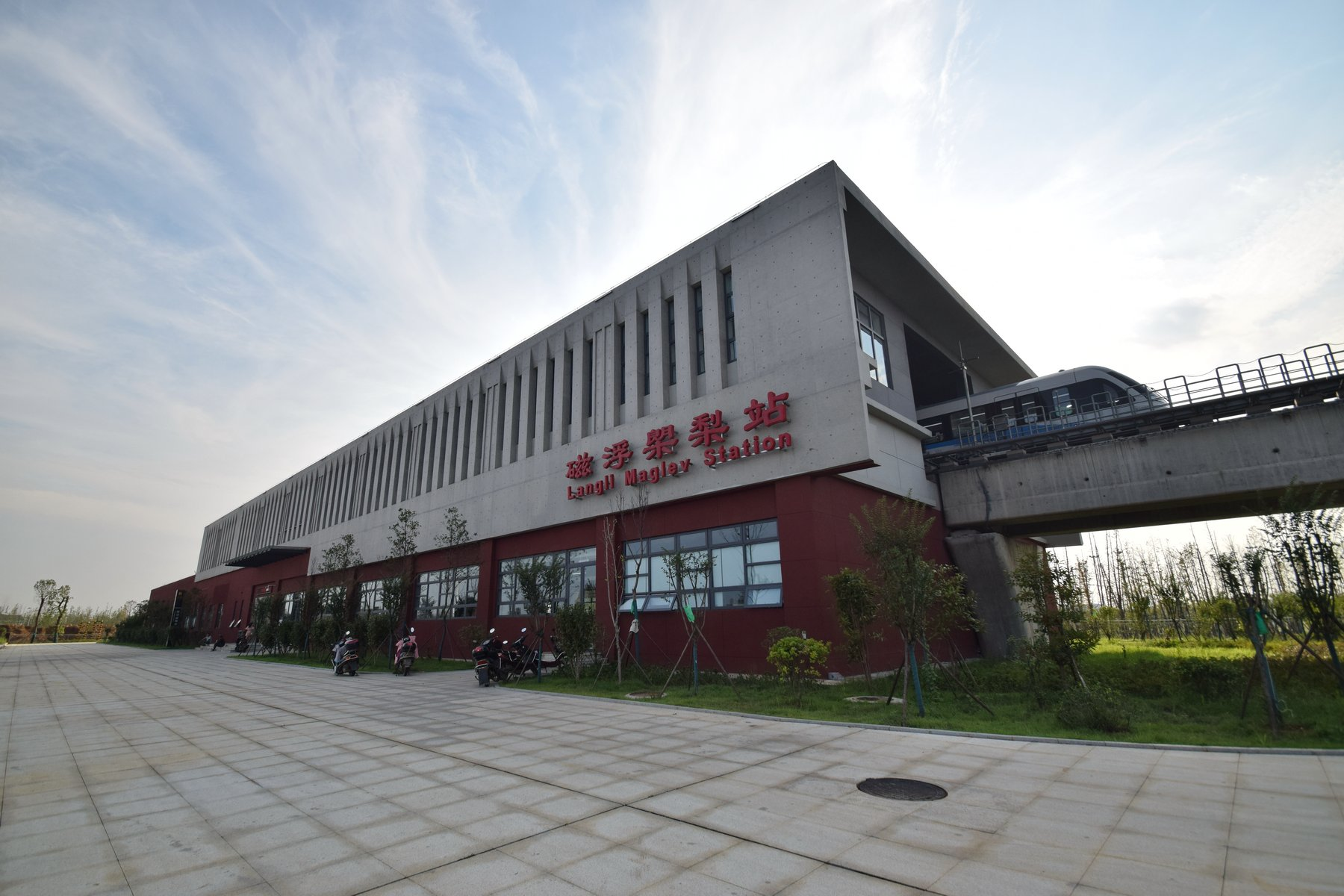

General information
- Location: Huangxing Avenue, Langli Subdistrict, Changsha County, Changsha, Hunan; China
- Coordinates: 28.1638°N 113.1274°E
- Operator: Hunan Maglev Transportation Development Co., Ltd.
- Line: Changsha Maglev Express

History
- Opened: May 6, 2016
Location

Langli station is a station on the Changsha Maglev Express. Trains stop here for 40 seconds to let passengers off and on.

== History ==
Construction on the station began in July 2014. At that time, it was stated that it would open to passengers by the end of 2015. It actually opened on May 6, 2016. The station is the only intermediate stop on the Changsha Maglev Express line.
