= Beishan, Changsha =

Beishan Town 北山镇
- Town
- Location in Hunan
- Coordinates: 28.3990°N 113.0207°E
- Country: China
- Province: Hunan
- Prefecture-level city: Changsha
- County: Changsha

Area
  - Total: 148.8 km^{2} (57.5 sq mi)

Population (2000)
  - Total: 52,840
  - Density: 355.1/km^{2} (919.7/sq mi)
- Time zone: UTC+8 (China Standard)

Beishan Town (Chinese: 北山镇) is a town in Changsha County, Changsha, Hunan Province, China. It administers 18 villages and three neighborhoods.
