= Shuangjiang, Changsha =

Town in Changsha County, Hunan, China

Shuangjiang Town 双江镇
- Town
- Location in Hunan
- Coordinates: 28.5482°N 113.4518°E
- Country: China
- Province: Hunan
- Prefecture-level city: Changsha
- County: Changsha

Area
  - Total: 65 km^{2} (25 sq mi)

Population (2000)
  - Total: 19,093
  - Density: 290/km^{2} (760/sq mi)
- Time zone: UTC+8 (China Standard)

Shuangjiang Town (Chinese: 双江镇) is a town in Changsha County, Changsha, Hunan Province, China. It administers 10 villages and one community. Shuangjiang town merged to Jinjing town on November 19, 2015.
