= Wayne B. Thomas =

American economist

Wayne B. Thomas (born January 24, 1969) is an American economist and Professor of Accounting at the University of Oklahoma who has specifically focused on market-based accounting research. He currently serves as Interim Dean of Price College of Business at the University of Oklahoma.

== Biography ==
Thomas studied accounting and obtained his BA in 1991 from Southwestern Oklahoma State University and his MS from Oklahoma State University, where in 1995 he also received his PhD.

After his graduation in 1996, Thomas joined the University of Utah as an associate professor in the accounting faculty. In 2000, he moved to the University of Oklahoma, where he was appointed John T. Steed Chair and Professor of Accounting. As of May 13, 2019, he was appointed interim dean of Price College of Business at the University of Oklahoma. Upon his appointment, students colloquially began to refer to the college of business as "Wayne's World", a reference to the popular 90s movie of the same name born out of the endearment many students, current and former, have for him.

Thomas' research interests are in a wide range of accounting topics, specifically "market-based accounting research, earnings management, time-series properties of earnings and earnings components, segment disclosures, financial statement analysis and international accounting issues."

== Selected publications ==
Thomas has authored and co-authored numerous publications.

- Herrmann, Don, and Wayne B. Thomas. "An analysis of segment disclosures under SFAS No. 131 and SFAS No. 14." Accounting Horizons 14.3 (2000): 287–302.
- Payne, Jeff L., and Wayne B. Thomas. "The implications of using stock-split adjusted I/B/E/S data in empirical research." The Accounting Review 78.4 (2003): 1049–1067.
- Herrmann, Don, Tatsuo Inoue, and Wayne B. Thomas. "The sale of assets to manage earnings in Japan." Journal of Accounting Research 41.1 (2003): 89–108.
- Hope, Ole-Kristian, and Wayne B. Thomas. "Managerial empire building and firm disclosure." Journal of Accounting Research 46.3 (2008): 591–626.
- Hope, Ole-Kristian, John Christian Langli, and Wayne B. Thomas. "Agency conflicts and auditing in private firms." Accounting, Organizations and Society (2012).
