= Former Residence of Xu Teli =

- 徐特立故居
- Location within Hunan

General information
- Type: Traditional folk houses
- Location: Changsha County, Hunan, China
- Coordinates: 28°04′32″N 113°17′35″E
- Construction started: 1862–1874
- Completed: 1862–1874
- Opened: August 2005
- Renovated: August 2005
- Owner: Government of Changsha County

Technical details
- Floor area: 581.7 m^{2} (6,261 sq ft)
- Grounds: 1,700-square-metre (18,000 sq ft)

The Former Residence of Xu Teli or Xu Teli's Former Residence (Chinese: 徐特立故居; pinyin: Xú Tèlì Gùjū) was built in the late Qing dynasty (1644–1911). It is located in Wumei Township, Changsha County, Hunan. It has an area of about 1,700 square metres (18,000 sq ft) and a building area of about 581.7 square metres (6,261 sq ft).

== History ==
The house was built by Xu's grandfather during the Tongzhi period (1862–1874) of the Qing dynasty (1644–1911).

In 1988, it was listed as one of Hunan's most important culture and relics site.

In August 2005, it was rebuilt by the People's Government of Changsha County and it was opened to the public.

In 2013, it was listed as one of "Major National Historical and Cultural Sites in Hunan" by the State Council of China.
