= Yong'an, Liuyang =

Yong'an Town 永安镇
- Town
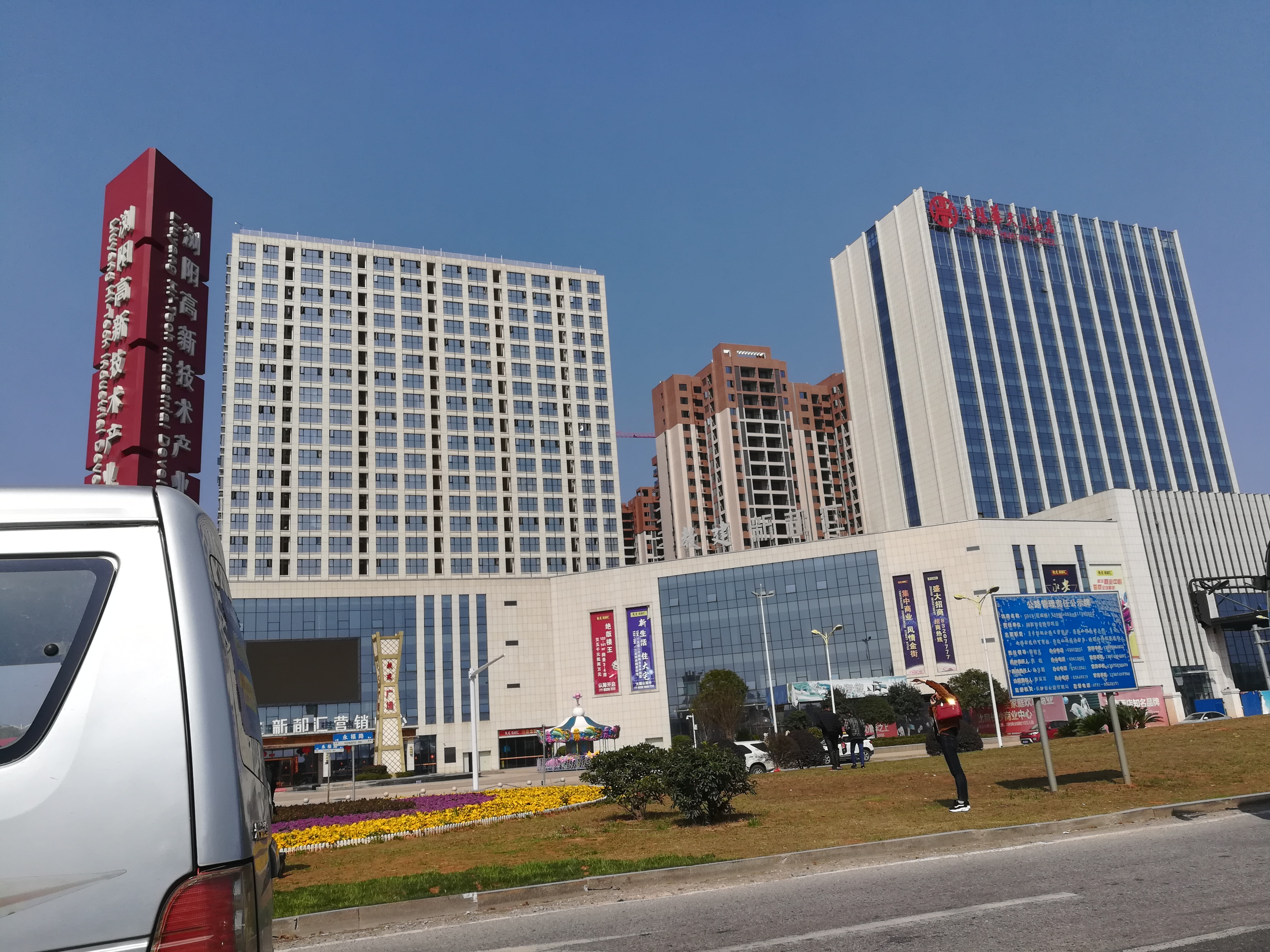
- Residential buildings in Yong'an Town.

- Location in Hunan
- Coordinates: 28°12′41″N 113°16′59″E
- Country: People's Republic of China
- Province: Hunan
- Prefecture-level city: Changsha
- County-level city: Liuyang

Area
  - Total: 112.1 km^{2} (43.3 sq mi)

Population (2015)
  - Total: 65,700
  - Density: 586/km^{2} (1,520/sq mi)
- Time zone: UTC+8 (China Standard)
- Postal code: 410323
- Area code: 0731

Yong'an Town (simplified Chinese: 永安镇; traditional Chinese: 永安鎮; pinyin: Yǒng'ān Zhèn) is a rural town in Liuyang City, Hunan Province, People's Republic of China. As of the 2015 census it had a population of 65,700 and an area of 112.1 square kilometres (43.3 sq mi). It is surrounded by Shashi Town to the north, Beisheng Town to the east, Dongyang Town to the southeast, Chunhua Town in Changsha County to the west, and Jiangbei Town of Changsha County to the south.

== Administrative divisions ==
The town is divided into seven villages and four communities, which include the following areas:

- Xinyuan Community (心源社区)
- Yong'an Community (永安社区)
- Yongxin Community (永新社区)
- Fengyu Community (丰裕社区)
- Ligeng Village (礼耕村)
- Shanshui Village (水山村)
- Lutang Village (芦塘村)
- Duzheng Village (督正村)
- Pingtou Village (坪头村)
- Yonghe Village (永和村)
- Xihutan Village (西湖潭村)

== Geography ==
Yong'an Town has three major reservoirs: Fengxing Reservoir (凤形水库; 'Reservoir of Phoenix Shape'), Shinao Reservoir (狮脑水库; 'Reservoir of Lion Head Shape') and Guihua Reservoir (桂花水库; 'Reservoir of Osmanthus Fragrans').

The Laodao River flows through the town.

== Economy ==
The local economy is primarily based upon agriculture and local industry.

== Education ==
- Yong'an Middle School

== Transportation ==
=== Expressway ===
The Changsha–Liuyang Expressway, from Changsha, running west to east through the town to Jiangxi.

=== Provincial Highway ===
The Provincial Highway S319 runs through the town.
