= Ansha, Changsha =

Ansha 安沙镇
- Town
- Location within Hunan
- Coordinates: 28°22′33″N 113°06′51″E
- Country: China
- Province: Hunan
- Prefecture-level city: Changsha
- County: Changsha

Area
  - Total: 160 km^{2} (62 sq mi)
- Elevation: 63 m (207 ft)

Population (2000)
  - Total: 48,555
- Time zone: UTC+8 (China Standard)

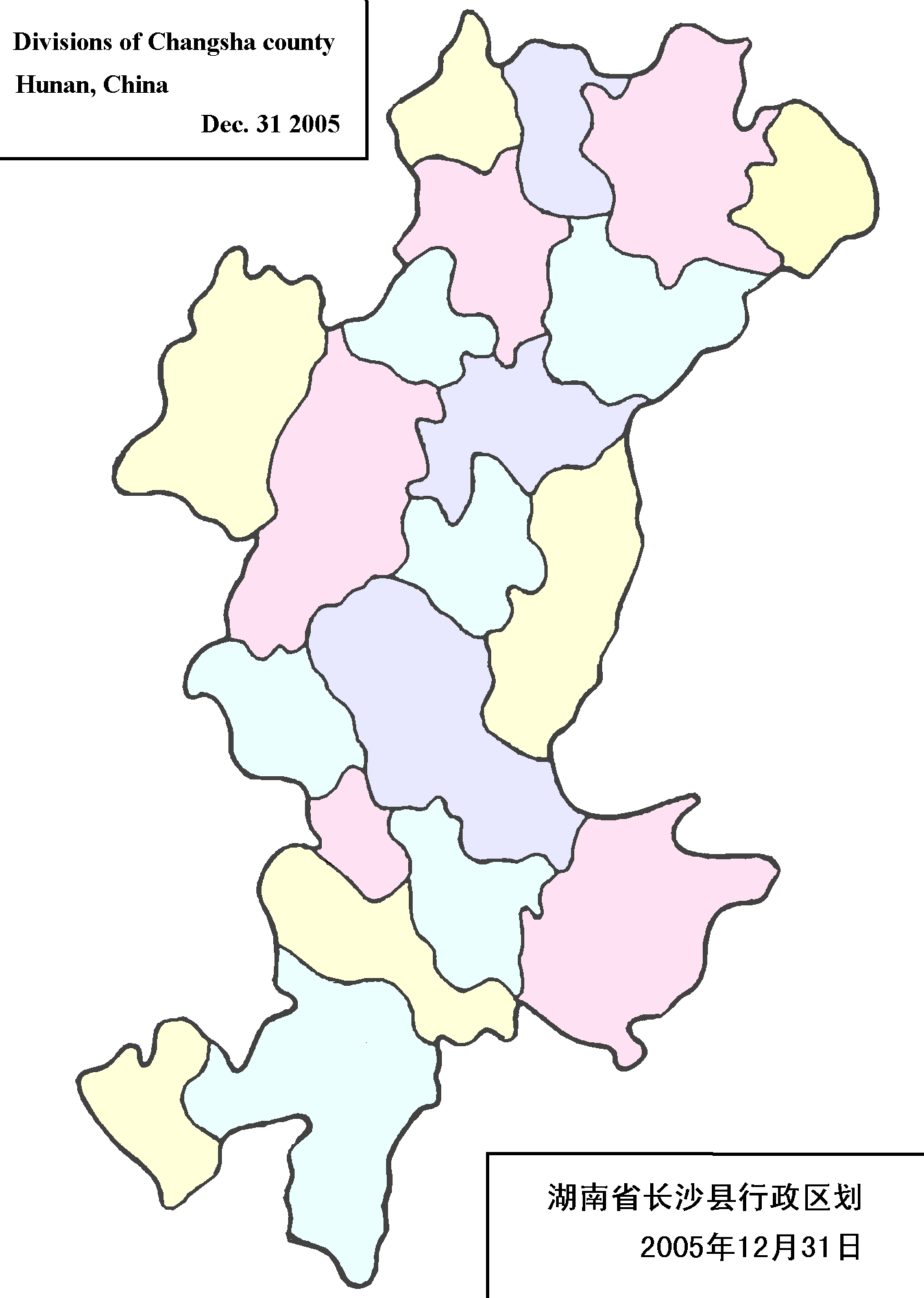
Template:image label

Ansha (Chinese: 安沙; pinyin: Ānshā) is a town in Changsha County, northeastern Hunan Province, China. It administers 21 villages and two neighbourhoods and is located about 15 kilometres (9.3 mi) north-northeast of the county seat.
