= Ansha Singh =

Indian footballer (born 1986)

Personal information
- Date of birth: 4 February 1986 (age 40)
- Place of birth: Bettiah, West Champaran, Bihar, India
- Position: Defender

Senior career*
Years	Team	Apps	(Gls)
- Railways
- Kickstart

International career^{‡}
2004	India U19		
2005–2013	India		
- * Club domestic league appearances and goals ‡ National team caps and goals as of 25 May 2013

Ansha Singh (born 4 February 1986) is an Indian footballer who played as a defender for the India women's national team. She also served as the captain of Indian Railways women's team and is employed at the East Central Railway zone, Indian Railways, Hajipur.

== Career ==
Singh capped for India at senior level during the 2005 AFC Women's championship qualification round. Her major career achievement was winning the 2010 South Asian Games gold medal for India.

sl no	CLUB/COUNTRY	TOURNAMENT	PLACE	date		RESULT
sl no	CLUB/COUNTRY	TOURNAMENT	PLACE	from	to	RESULT
1	BIHAR STATE TEAM	32 NATIONAL GAMES 2002	HYDERABAD, VISAKHAPATNAM	13-Dec-02	22-Dec-02	
2	BIHAR STATE TEAM	11TH WOMENS NATIONAL FOOTBALL CHAMPIONSHIP	CHENNAI	08-Jun-03	24-Jun-03	
3	BIHAR STATE TEAM	3RD JUNIOR WOMEN NATIONAL FOOTBALL CHAMPIONSHIP	HALDWANI	22-Sep-03	08-Oct-03	
4	INDIA	AFC U-19 WOMENS CHAMPIONSHIP CHINA PR 2004	CHINA PR	26-May-04	06-Jun-04	
5	B. R AMBEDKAR UNIVERSITY	ALL INDIA INTER UNIVERSITY FOOTBALL WOMENS TOURNAMENT	JIWAJI UNIVERSITY, GWALIOR	24-Jan-05		
6	BIHAR STATE TEAM	13th WOMENS NATIONAL FOOTBALL CHAMPIONSHIP	IMPHAL, MANIPUR	20-Feb-05	15-Mar-05	SAG GOLD MEDALIST
7	INDIA	AFC WOMENS CHAMPIONSHIP QUALIFYING ROUND	VIETNAM	12-Jun-05	24-Jun-05	
8	BIHAR STATE TEAM	16th SENIOR WOMENS NATIONAL FOOTBALL CHAMPIONSHIP 2007–2008	HALDIA, WEST BENGAL	29-Feb-08	16-Mar-08	
9	INDIA	SOUTH ASIAN GAMES (SAG) 2010	DHAKA, BANGLADESH	29-Jan-10	09-Feb-10	
10	INDIA	FIFA WOMENS OLYMPIC FOOTBALL TOURNAMENT LONDON 2O12, AFC QUALIFICATIONROUND 1 2011	DHAKA, BANGLADESH	18-Mar-11	23-Mar-11	
11	BIHAR STATE TEAM	19th SENIOR WOMENS NATIONAL FOOTBALL CHAMPIONSHIP 10–11	BHILAI, DURG CHHATISGARH	25-Apr-11	17-May-11	
0	INDIA	AFC WOMENS PREPARATION CAMP	PUNE	01-Apr-13	11-May-13	
13	INDIA	EXPOSURE TOUR FRIENDLY WITH BAHRAINS WOMENS NATIONAL TEAM	BAHRAIN WOMENS	12-May-13	18-May-13	
14	INDIA	AFC WOMENS CUP 2014 QUALLIFIER ROUND 2013	PALESTINE	21-May-13	25-May-13	
15	INDIAN RAILWAYS	20th SENIOR WOMENS NATIONAL FOOTBALL CHAMPIONSHIP 10–11	ASSAM	27-Apr-14	13-May-14	
16	EAST CENTRAL RAILWAY	BIHAR STATE WOMENS CHAMPIONSHIP (S. EJEZ HUSAIN CUP 2014–15)	MUNGER DIST, BIHAR			
17	KICKSTARTER FOOTBALL CLUB	SENIOR WOMENS LEAGUE	KARNATAKA	2020	2020	

== Honours ==
India

- South Asian Games Gold medal: 2010
