= John Christian Langli =

Norwegian economist

John Christian Langli (born 1961) is a Norwegian economist, and Professor at the BI Norwegian Business School.

Langli graduated from the BI Norwegian Business School with a siviløkonom degree in 1988, and took the dr.oecon. degree at the Norwegian School of Economics and Business Administration in 1993.

He was a research fellow at these respective institutions from 1988 to 1992 and 1992 to 1994. He was hired as associate professor at BI Norwegian Business School in 1994, and is now professor. He headed the Department of Accounting - Auditing and Law from 2000 to 2005. He has also been a visiting scholar at the University of Washington.

== Selected publications ==
- King, Raymond D., and John Christian Langli. "Accounting diversity and firm valuation." The International Journal of Accounting 33.5 (1998): 529–567.
- Hope, Ole-Kristian, and John Christian Langli. "Auditor independence in a private firm and low litigation risk setting." The Accounting Review 85.2 (2010): 573–605.
- Hope, Ole-Kristian, John Christian Langli, and Wayne B. Thomas. "Agency conflicts and auditing in private firms." Accounting, Organizations and Society (2012).
