= Quantang Subdistrict =

Quantang Subdistrict 泉塘街道
- Subdistrict
- Interactive map of Quantang Subdistrict
- Country: China
- Province: Hunan
- Prefecture-level city: Changsha
- County: Changsha

Area
  - Total: 20.84 km^{2} (8.05 sq mi)

Population (September 2009)
  - Total: 45,000
  - Density: 2,200/km^{2} (5,600/sq mi)
- Time zone: UTC+8 (China Standard)

Quantang Subdistrict (Chinese: 泉塘街道) is a subdistrict in Changsha County, Changsha, Hunan province, China. It was established in September 2009, and is made up of six neighborhoods and two administrative villages.
