= Qingshanpu =

Qingshanpu Town 青山铺镇
- Town
- Location in Hunan
- Coordinates: 28.4610°N 113.1843°E
- Country: China
- Province: Hunan
- Prefecture-level city: Changsha
- County: Changsha

Area
  - Total: 47 km^{2} (18 sq mi)

Population (2000)
  - Total: 18,244
  - Density: 390/km^{2} (1,000/sq mi)
- Time zone: UTC+8 (China Standard)

Qingshanpu Town (Chinese: 青山铺镇) is a town in Changsha County, Changsha, Hunan Province, China. It administers seven villages and one community.
