= Guoyuan, Changsha =

Guoyuan Town 果园镇
- Town
- Location in Hunan
- Coordinates: 28.3406°N 113.2235°E
- Country: China
- Province: Hunan
- Prefecture-level city: Changsha
- County: Changsha

Area
  - Total: 78 km^{2} (30 sq mi)

Population (2000)
  - Total: 22,101
  - Density: 280/km^{2} (730/sq mi)
- Time zone: UTC+8 (China Standard)

Guoyuan Town (Chinese: 果园镇) is a town in the center of Changsha County, Changsha, capital of Hunan Province, China. It administers seven villages and two communities.
