= Gaoqiao Town, Changsha =

Gaoqiao Town 高桥镇
- Town
- Location in Hunan
- Coordinates: 28.4607°N 113.3361°E
- Country: China
- Province: Hunan
- Prefecture-level city: Changsha
- County: Changsha

Area
  - Total: 103 km^{2} (40 sq mi)

Population (2000)
  - Total: 28,970
  - Density: 281/km^{2} (728/sq mi)
- Time zone: UTC+8 (China Standard)

Gaoqiao Town (Chinese: 高桥镇) is a town in Changsha County, Changsha, Hunan Province, China. It administers one community and ten villages.
