= Xianglong Subdistrict =

Xianglong Subdistrict 湘龙街道
- Subdistrict
- Interactive map of Xianglong Subdistrict
- Country: China
- Province: Hunan
- Prefecture-level city: Changsha
- County: Changsha

Area
  - Total: 22.63 km^{2} (8.74 sq mi)

Population (September 2009)
  - Total: 68,000
  - Density: 3,000/km^{2} (7,800/sq mi)
- Time zone: UTC+8 (China Standard)

Xianglong Subdistrict (Chinese: 湘龙街道) is a subdistrict in Changsha County, Changsha, Hunan province, China. It was established in September 2009. It is made up of five communities and three administrative villages.
