= Jinjing, Changsha =

Jinjing Town 金井镇
- Town
- Location in Hunan
- Coordinates: 28.5265°N 113.3755°E
- Country: China
- Province: Hunan
- Prefecture-level city: Changsha
- County: Changsha

Area
  - Total: 144 km^{2} (56 sq mi)

Population (2000)
  - Total: 41,900
  - Density: 291/km^{2} (754/sq mi)
- Time zone: UTC+8 (China Standard)

Jinjing Town (Chinese: 金井镇), a town in Changsha County, Hunan Province, China, administers two communities and 14 villages with the Koganei Community the center of government. The name Jinjing means "golden well", and derives from a well that provided drinking water for the entire town for hundreds of years. The well is now preserved by the local people; the water supply function has come to an end because the lifestyle of the local people has changed. Near the well and the old town center a Buddhist temple called Jiuxisi Temple (Stream of Nine Turnings) overlooks the old town site. Recorded as having been built at the beginning of the Tang dynasty, the supervisor of construction work for developing the well site was well-known general Yu-chi Gong; this provides proof that Jinjing Town was already an important town at the time. Shuangjiang town merged to Jinjing on November 19, 2015.

== Tiger Breeding Center ==
Sanzhen Tiger Park, a Manchurian tiger breeding center, one of the three such breeding centers in China, attracts many visitors who can tour the site after gaining the permission of local site managers. The park attracts many tourists and has developed into a leading center for tiger breeding. Jinjing was selected to be the home of the creature in the natural environment in the tea plantations.

== Tea production ==
The high quality organic green tea produced in Jinjing is widely sold in the United States, Japan, and Europe.

The mountains surrounding Jinjing not only create a fine climate for growing high quality tea, but also make it possible to build water reservoirs which provide water for the growing population of the county and the nearby city of Changsha.

The tea plantations, lakes, tigers and organic farms of Jinjing attract tourists from across the nation and even the world. The county and Changsha are also investing in the tourism industry in the northern part of Hunan Province, with Jinjing Town located at this tourist hub.

== Access ==
From Changsha airport to Jinjing takes one hour by car and around the 70 minutes from the city centre depending on traffic conditions. A few hotels, including Julian's Country Inn, offer free transportation for passengers from the airport.
