= Lukou, Changsha =

Lukou Town 路口镇
- Town
- Location in Hunan
- Coordinates: 28.3905°N 113.2957°E
- Country: China
- Province: Hunan
- Prefecture-level city: Changsha
- County: Changsha

Area
  - Total: 89 km^{2} (34 sq mi)

Population (2000)
  - Total: 26,959
  - Density: 300/km^{2} (780/sq mi)
- Time zone: UTC+8 (China Standard)

Lukou Town (Chinese: 路口镇) is a town in Changsha County, Changsha, Hunan Province, China. It administers eight villages and two communities.
