= Xingsha Subdistrict =

- Subdistrict

Chinese transcription(s)
  - Simplified: 星沙街道
  - Traditional: 星沙街道
  - Pinyin: Xīngshā Jiēdào
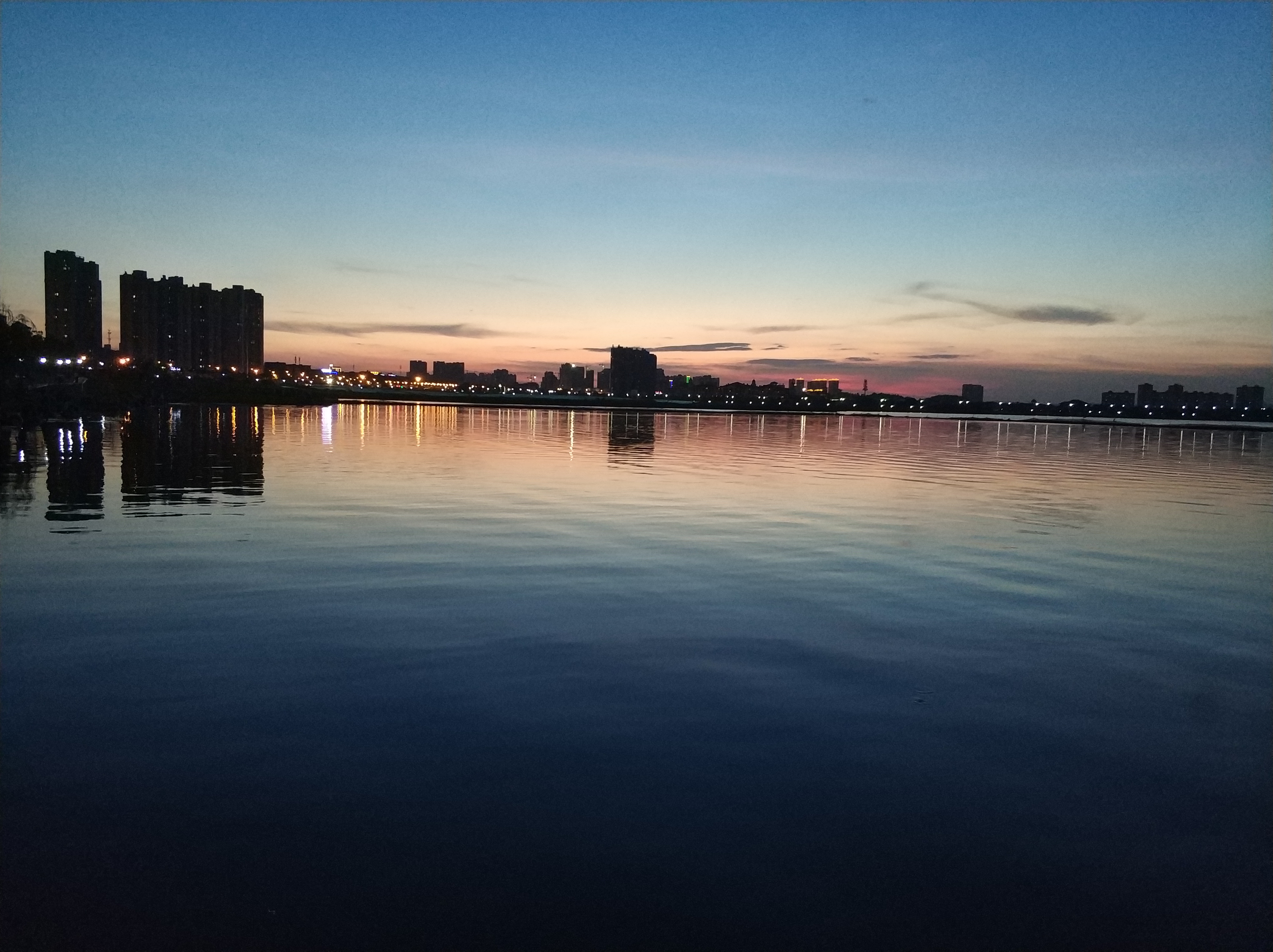
- Songya Lake at dusk, 26 June 2018.

- Location in Hunan
- Coordinates: 28.257324°N 113.123405°E
- Country: China
- Province: Hunan
- Prefecture-level city: Changsha
- County: Changsha

Area
  - Total: 24.53 km^{2} (9.47 sq mi)

Population (September 2009)
  - Total: 93,000
  - Density: 3,800/km^{2} (9,800/sq mi)
- Time zone: UTC+8 (China Standard)

Xingsha Subdistrict (Chinese: 星沙街道) is a subdistrict and the county seat of Changsha County in Hunan Province, China. It was reformed in September 2009. Xingsha covers 25.34 km^{2} (9.78 sq mi), and as of the 2010 census, it had a population of 122,360. The subdistrict is divided into 17 communities.
