= Langli, Changsha =

Langli Subdistrict 㮾梨街道
- Subdistrict
- Location in Hunan
- Coordinates: 28.1772°N 113.1189°E
- Country: China
- Province: Hunan
- Prefecture-level city: Changsha
- County: Changsha

Area
  - Total: 40 km^{2} (15 sq mi)

Population (2000)
  - Total: 30,279
  - Density: 760/km^{2} (2,000/sq mi)
- Time zone: UTC+8 (China Standard)

Langli Subdistrict (Chinese: 㮾梨街道; pinyin: Lǎnglí jiēdào, or Chinese: 榔梨街道; pinyin: Lánglí jiēdào) is a subdistrict in Changsha County, Changsha, Hunan province, China. It contains five villages and three communities, with the government in Langli Community. It was a town until 2012.

== Religion ==
Taogong Palace is a Taoist temple in the subdistrict.
