= Shashi, Liuyang =

Shashi Town 沙市镇
- Town
- Location in Hunan
- Coordinates: 28°20′45″N 113°25′26″E
- Country: People's Republic of China
- Province: Hunan
- Prefecture-level city: Changsha
- County-level city: Liuyang

Area
  - Total: 209.7 km^{2} (81.0 sq mi)

Population (2015)
  - Total: 67,700
  - Density: 323/km^{2} (836/sq mi)
- Time zone: UTC+8 (China Standard)
- Postal code: 410326
- Area code: 0731

Shashi Town (simplified Chinese: 沙市镇; traditional Chinese: 沙市鎮; pinyin: Shāshì Zhèn) is a rural town in Liuyang City, Hunan Province, People's Republic of China. As of the 2015 census it had a population of 67,700 and an area of 209.7 square kilometres (81.0 sq mi). It is surrounded by the towns of Gaoqiao and Jinjing on the north, Longfu Town on the northeast, Chunkou Town on the southeast, Lukou Town on the west, and the towns of Beisheng and Yong'an on the south.

== Administrative divisions ==
The town is divided into 11 villages and four communities, which include the following areas:

- Xiushan Community (秀山社区)
- Hebei Community (河背社区)
- Shashi Community (沙市社区)
- Changchun Community (长春社区)
- Tuannong Village (团农村)
- Yangtian Village (秧田村)
- Wenguang Village (文光村)
- Dongmen Village (东门村)
- Baishui Village (白水村)
- Zhongzhou Village (中洲村)
- Dunmu Village (敦睦村)
- Liantang Village (莲塘村)
- Youzhu Village (友助村)
- Chima Village (赤马村)
- Taoyuan Village (桃源村)

== Geography ==
The Laodao River flows through the town.

The town has one lake and two reservoirs: Chima Lake (赤马湖; 'Lake of Red Horse'), Jinpen Reservoir (金盆水库; 'Reservoir of Gold Bowl') and Jinfeng Reservoir (金凤水库; 'Reservoir of Gold Phoenix').

Two mountains situated at the town: Mount Huangxiling (黄西岭; 351 metres (1,152 ft)) and Mount Sanjianlin (三尖林; 485 metres (1,591 ft)).

== Economy ==
The local economy is primarily based upon agriculture and local industry, such as apparel industry, textile industry and mining industry.

== Education ==
- Shashi Middle School

== Transportation ==
=== Expressway ===
The Liuyang-Liling Expressway in Hunan leads to Liling through the town.

=== County road ===
The town is connected to three county roads: X009, X013 and X011.

== Attractions ==
Chima Lake (赤马湖; 'Lake of Red Horse') is a famous scenic spot in the town, it provides water for irrigation and recreational activities.
