= Huanghua, Changsha =

Huanghua Town 黄花镇
- Town
- Location in Hunan
- Coordinates: 28.2388°N 113.188°E
- Country: China
- Province: Hunan
- Prefecture-level city: Changsha
- County: Changsha

Area
  - Total: 169 km^{2} (65 sq mi)

Population (2000)
  - Total: 74,219
  - Density: 439/km^{2} (1,140/sq mi)
- Time zone: UTC+8 (China Standard)

Huanghua Town (Chinese: 黄花镇) is a town in Changsha County, Changsha, Hunan province, China. It contains three communities and 20 villages. It is the location of Changsha Huanghua International Airport.
