= Changsha County =

Changsha County 长沙县
- County
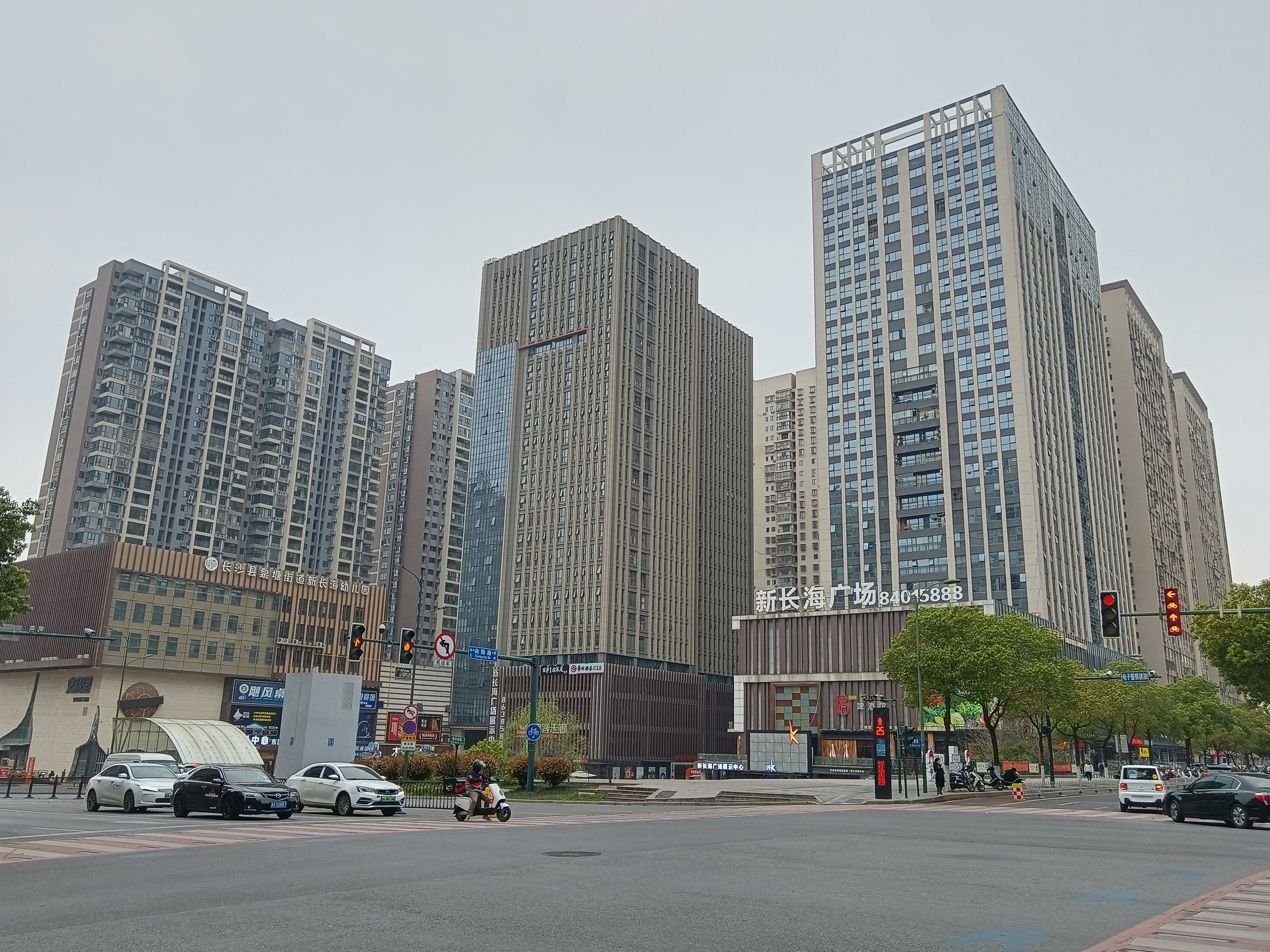

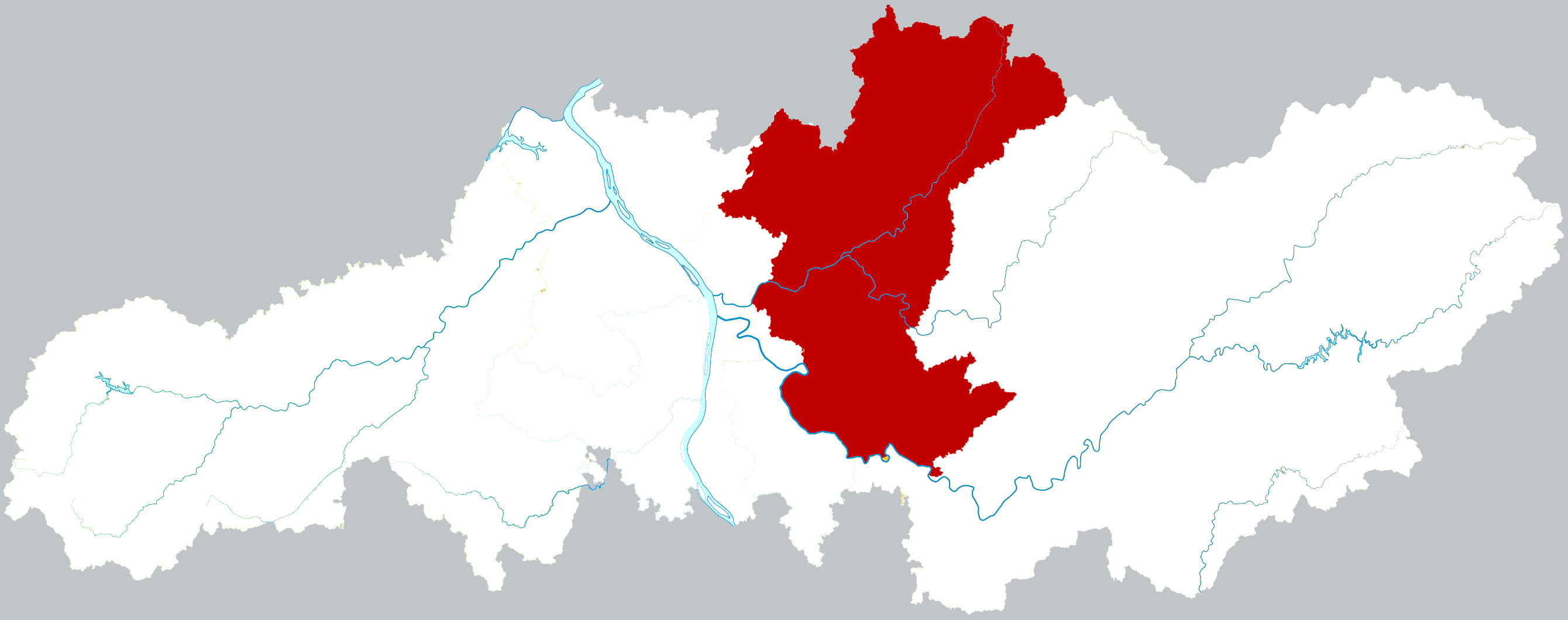
- Location of Changsha County within Changsha

- Location in Hunan
- Coordinates: 28°14′48″N 113°04′50″E
- Country: People's Republic of China
- Province: Hunan
- Prefecture-level city: Changsha
- Seat: Xingsha

Area
  - Total: 1,997 km^{2} (771 sq mi)

Population (2006)
  - Total: 750,500
  - Density: 375.8/km^{2} (973.4/sq mi)
- Time zone: UTC+8 (China Standard)
- Postal code: 4101xx

Changsha County (simplified Chinese: 长沙县; traditional Chinese: 長沙縣; pinyin: Chángshā Xiàn; lit. 'Long sandbar'), commonly known as Xingsha (Chinese: 星沙; pinyin: Xīngshā; lit. 'Star sandbar'), is a county in Hunan Province, China. It is under the administration of the prefecture-level city of Changsha. Located in the west portion of Changsha, the county is bordered to the north by Miluo City and Pingjiang County, to the west by Wangcheng, Kaifu and Furong Districts, to the southwest by Yuhua District, and to the southeast and the east by Liuyang City. Changsha County covers 1,756 km^{2} (678 sq mi). As of 2015 it has a registered population of 743,000 and a permanent resident population of 916,000. The county has 5 subdistricts and 13 towns under its jurisdiction. The county seat is Xingsha Subdistrict (星沙街道).

== History ==
The origin of the name "Changsha" is lost in antiquity. The name first appeared known in the Yi Zhou Shu in the 11 century BCE during the reign of King Cheng of the Zhou dynasty. A vassal lord from the Changsha area sent a type of softshell turtle known as "Changsha softshell turtle" (Chinese: 長沙鼈; pinyin: Chángshā biē) to the Zhou king as a tribute. The present Changsha County was parts of the historic Qianzhong Commandery of Chu state in late Warring States period (481 BC to 221 BC) and the historic Xiang County (Chinese: 湘縣) in Qin dynasty (221 BC–206 BC). During the Han dynasty (206 BC – 220 AD), Xiang County was renamed Linxiang County (Chinese: 臨湘縣). Changsha County was formally established with the replacement of the Linxiang County, concurrent with the establishment of the Sui dynasty. Shanhua County (Chinese: 善化縣) was formed from 5 townships of Changsha County and 2 townships of Xiangtan County in 1098 AD during the Song dynasty. Changsha and Shanhua Counties were merged into modern day Changsha County in 1912.

== Geography ==
Changsha County is located in the northern part of the Changsha-Hengyang Hilly Basin (Chinese: 长衡丘陵盆地). It is located at the southern end of the Mufu Mountains, Lianyun Mountains (Chinese: 连云山) and the branches of Dalong Mountain (Chinese: 大龙山), and the northern edge of the Zhuzhou Uplift Belt (Chinese: 株洲隆起带). The mountains of Longhua (Chinese: 龙华山) and Wuchuan (Chinese: 乌川诸山) are in the east, Taojiapai (Chinese: 陶家排) and Tanpenpo (Chinese: 炭盆坡) mountains lie in the south, and the mountains of Yingzhu (Chinese: 影珠山) and Mingyue (Chinese: 明月山) are in the northwest. The mountains of Xingyun (Chinese: 兴云山) and Piaofeng (Chinese: 飘峰山) stand in the north. The Mingyue Mountain in Beishan Town is the highest peak with an elevation of 659 meters above sea level. The terrain gradually tilts from the north, east and south to the central and western regions, forming an irregular "dustpan" shape. There are seven types of rock layers in metamorphic rocks, glutenite, limestone, red rock, laterite, sand shale and granite. It is divided into five types of landforms: hillocks, plains, mountains, hills and waters, mainly hillocks and plains.

The county is rich in mineral resources. After exploration, it has been found that tungsten, tin, nickel, antimony, bismuth, antimony, cobalt, molybdenum, copper, lead and zinc, gold, silicon, coal, kaolin, limestone, fluorite, granite, monazite sand Wait for more than 20 minerals. 113 mineral deposits have been discovered, including 1 large deposit, 4 medium, 62 small, and 46 minerals. The non-metallic minerals such as brick clay, silica, quartz sand and building stone related to building materials have been exploited, accounting for 80% of all mineral deposits. Most of the other minerals have not been exploited due to their small scale. The mineral resources in the territory are mainly non-metallic minerals such as granite, kaolin and shale for brick and tile. The metal mines are mostly small and mineralized.

The northwestern part of the county, Beishan-Qingshanpu-Fulin Towns, is a widely developed granite, which is an important producer of granite minerals in the county; The resources of kaolinite in Dinggong and Fulin are abundant. The vast areas of Chunhua, Huanghua, Huangxing, Ganshan and Jiangbei in the central part are sand and shale development areas, which are the main shale mining areas in the territory. Jiangbei and other places in the southeastern part have limestone output. Tungsten, gold and polymetallic deposits in the middle and low mountainous areas at the junction of the northern part of the territory and Pingjiang County. There is underground hot water resources found in Malinqiao of Lukou Town.

There are 10 species of mammals, 48 species of birds and more than 10 species of snakes in the county. Among them, pangolin, civet, monkey face eagle, white pheasant and tiger frog are national second-class protected animals. There are more than 120 kinds of wild medicinal plants and more than 80 kinds of woody plants. Among them, Ginkgo biloba, Eucommia ulmoides and Fujian cypress are national secondary protected plants, and Metasequoia is a provincial first-class protected plant.

"Luodai Black Pig" (Chinese: 罗代黑猪) is a national geographical indication protection product, while "Jinjing" (Chinese: 金井茶) and "Xiangfeng" (Chinese: 湘丰茶) teas are "China Famous Brands".

The county's forest coverage rate is 43.74%, the forest greening rate is 49.83%, and the total forest accumulation is 4.185 million cubic meters.

=== Climate ===
Climate data for Changsha County, elevation 101 m (331 ft), (1991–2020 normals)
Month	Jan	Feb	Mar	Apr	May	Jun	Jul	Aug	Sep	Oct	Nov	Dec	Year
Mean daily maximum °C (°F)	8.8 (47.8)	11.9 (53.4)	16.2 (61.2)	22.8 (73.0)	27.4 (81.3)	30.5 (86.9)	34.0 (93.2)	33.3 (91.9)	29.2 (84.6)	23.9 (75.0)	17.9 (64.2)	11.8 (53.2)	22.3 (72.1)
Daily mean °C (°F)	5.3 (41.5)	7.9 (46.2)	11.9 (53.4)	18.0 (64.4)	22.7 (72.9)	26.2 (79.2)	29.4 (84.9)	28.6 (83.5)	24.5 (76.1)	19.1 (66.4)	13.1 (55.6)	7.5 (45.5)	17.8 (64.1)
Mean daily minimum °C (°F)	2.7 (36.9)	5.0 (41.0)	8.7 (47.7)	14.3 (57.7)	19.0 (66.2)	22.9 (73.2)	25.7 (78.3)	25.1 (77.2)	21.1 (70.0)	15.6 (60.1)	9.7 (49.5)	4.4 (39.9)	14.5 (58.1)
Average precipitation mm (inches)	78.9 (3.11)	88.2 (3.47)	155.8 (6.13)	187.5 (7.38)	209.8 (8.26)	225.8 (8.89)	151.9 (5.98)	117.9 (4.64)	84.1 (3.31)	60.8 (2.39)	81.7 (3.22)	56.2 (2.21)	1,498.6 (58.99)
Average precipitation days (≥ 0.1 mm)	14.4	13.7	17.9	16.9	16.3	14.8	10.4	10.9	8.9	9.5	10.2	11.1	155
Average snowy days	3.8	2.2	0.3	0	0	0	0	0	0	0	0.1	1.4	7.8
Average relative humidity (%)	83	82	83	81	81	83	76	78	79	79	81	80	81
Mean monthly sunshine hours	65.3	68.6	83.3	112.1	140.3	136.8	224.4	203.4	151.9	132.8	113.0	101.0	1,532.9
Percentage possible sunshine	20	22	22	29	33	33	53	50	42	38	35	32	34
Source: China Meteorological Administration

== Economy ==
Changsha County is the most developed county in Central China ranking 8th in the Top 100 of counties and county-level cities of China by comprehensive strength in 2020. Changsha County is one of the best developed manufacturing counties and county-level cities in the province, the manufacturing industry is its economic pillar. Changsha's manufacturing engines are construction machinery, automobile and parts, electronics and information. For 2015, the gross domestic product of Changsha County was CN¥116.83 billion (US$18.76 billion), Of this total, the value added of the manufacturing industry was CN¥82.16 billion (US$13.19 billion), shares 70.32 percentage of its GDP. Changsha County is home of the Sany (三一集团), Sunward (山河智能), Broad (远大空调), Zoomlion (中联重科) and forest and paper (泰格林纸) companies.

According to preliminary accounting of the statistical authority, the gross domestic product of Changsha County in 2017 was 143,110 million yuan (21,196 million US dollars), up by 11.3 percent over the previous year. Of this total, the value added of the primary industry was 7,590 million yuan (1,124 million US dollars), up by 3.1 percent, that of the secondary industry was 91,800 million yuan (13,596 million US dollars), up by 11.6 percent and that of the tertiary industry was 43,720 million yuan (6,475 million US dollars), up by 12.1 percent. The value added of the primary industry accounted for 5.30 percent of the GDP; that of the secondary industry accounted for 64.15 percent; and that of the tertiary industry accounted for 30.55 percent. The per capita GDP in 2017 was 137,000 yuan (20,291 US dollars).

== Subdivisions ==
According to the result on adjustment of township-level administrative divisions of Changhsha county on November 19, 2015, Changsha county has 5 subdistricts and 13 towns under its jurisdiction, they are:

5 subdistricts

- Changlong Subdistrict (长龙街道)
- Langli Subdistrict (榔梨街道)
- Quantang Subdistrict (泉塘街道)
- Xianglong Subdistrict (湘龙街道)
- Xingsha Subdistrict (星沙街道)

13 towns

- Ansha (安沙镇)
- Beishan (北山镇)
- Chunhua (春华镇)
- Fulin (福临镇)
- Gaoqiao (高桥镇)
- Guoyuan (果园镇)
- Huanghua (黄花镇)
- Huangxing (黄兴镇)
- Jiangbei (江背镇)
- Jinjing (金井镇)
- Kaihui (开慧镇)
- Lukou (路口镇)
- Qingshanpu (青山铺镇)
