= Li Bai (disambiguation) =

Li Bai (701–762) was a famous Chinese poet of the Tang dynasty.

Li Bai or Libai may also refer to:

- Li Bai (spy) (1910–1949), a spy of the Chinese Communist Party
- Lilian Lee (born 1959), original name Li Bai, Hong Kong writer
- James Riady (born 1957), Chinese-Indonesian businessman
- Li Zongren and Bai Chongxi, powerful partners in Chinese politics and military affairs in the earlier 20th century
- David Libai (1934 – 2023), Israeli politician
- Barak Libai, marketing professor at Reichman University in Israel
- Libai Huang, a chemist at Purdue University
