= Guankou =

Guankou may refer to:

- Talk strings, oral technique used in xiangsheng performances

== Places in China ==
- Guankou, Fujian, in Jimei District, Xiamen, Fujian
- Guankou, Hubei, in Xishui County, Hubei
- Guankou, Shaanxi, in Xunyang, Shaanxi
- Guankou Subdistrict, Liuyang, Hunan
- Guankou Subdistrict, Dujiangyan, Sichuan
