= Huaichuan, Liuyang =

Huaichuan Subdistrict 淮川街道
- Subdistrict
- Location in Hunan
- Coordinates: 28°08′29″N 113°37′16″E
- Country: People's Republic of China
- Province: Hunan
- Prefecture-level city: Changsha
- County-level city: Liuyang

Area
  - Total: 12.31 km^{2} (4.75 sq mi)

Population (2015)
  - Total: 53,000
  - Density: 4,300/km^{2} (11,000/sq mi)
- Time zone: UTC+8 (China Standard)
- Postal code: 410000
- Area code: 0731

Huaichuan Subdistrict (Chinese: 淮川街道; pinyin: Huaíchuān Jiēdào) is an urban subdistrict in Liuyang City, Hunan Province, People's Republic of China. As of the 2015 census it had a population of 53,000 and an area of 12.31 square kilometres (4.75 sq mi).

== Administrative divisions ==
The subdistrict is divided into eight communities, which include the following areas:

- Chengxijie Community (城西街社区)
- Xizhengjie Community (西正街社区)
- Chaoyangjie Community (朝阳街社区)
- Beizhengjie Community (北正街社区)
- Xinbei Community (新北社区)
- Beiyuan Community (北园社区)
- Chengdong Community (城东社区)
- Liancheng Community (联城社区)

== Geography ==
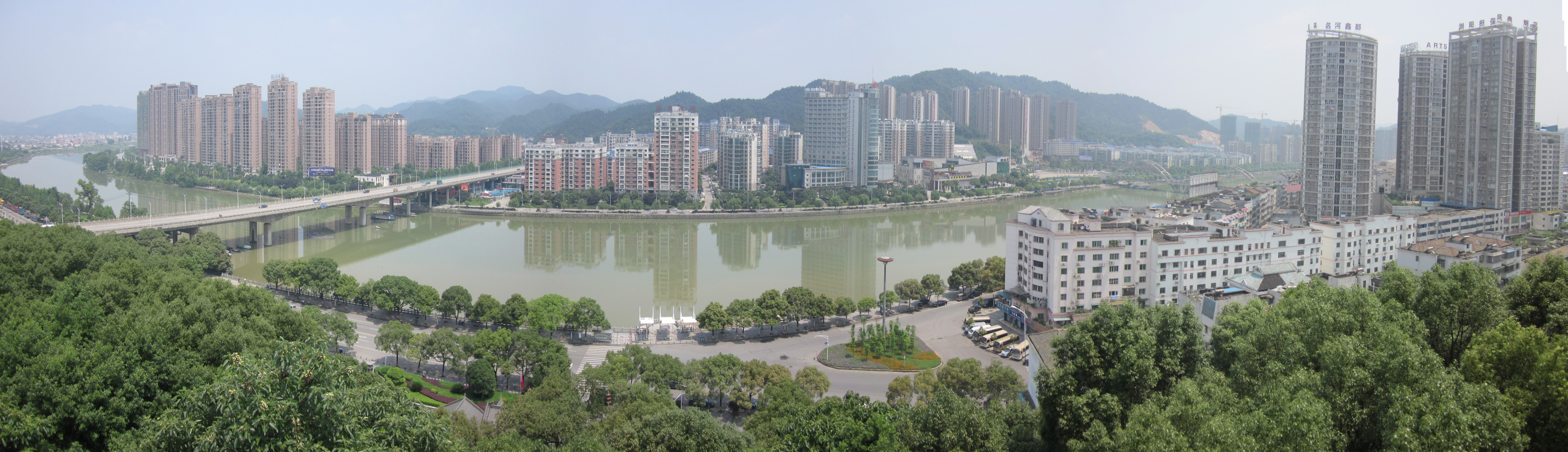
A panoramic view of Liuyang in 2014. The Liuyang River flows through Huaichuan and Hehua Subdistricts of Liuyang city.

Liuyang River, also known as the mother river, flows through the subdistrict.

== Economy ==
The economy is supported primarily by commerce and tourism.

== Education ==
There are three primary schools, one middle school and one high school: Renmin Road School, Liuyang River School and Xianghuai School, Liuyang River Middle School, and Liuyang No. 1 High School.

== Hospital ==
- Liuyang Municipal Renmin Hospital

== Transportation ==
=== National Highway ===
The subdistrict is connected to two national highways: G106 and G319.

=== Provincial Highway ===
The Provincial Highway S309 runs through the subdistrict.

== Religion ==
The Liuyang Confucius Temple and the Ancestral Hall of Tan Sitong (谭嗣同祠) are famous tourist attractions.

Wenjin Temple is a Buddhist temple in the subdistrict.

Yaowang Shengchong Palace is a Taoist temple in the subdistrict.

== Attractions ==
Simiao Park (思邈公园), Cuiyuan Park (翠园公园) and Martyrs Park (烈士公园) are public and urban park in the subdistrict.

The main attractions are the Former Residence of Ouyang Yuqian (欧阳予倩故居), Former Residence of Tan Sitong, Kuiwen Pavilion (奎文阁) and Chenghuang Temple (城隍庙).

== Gallery ==
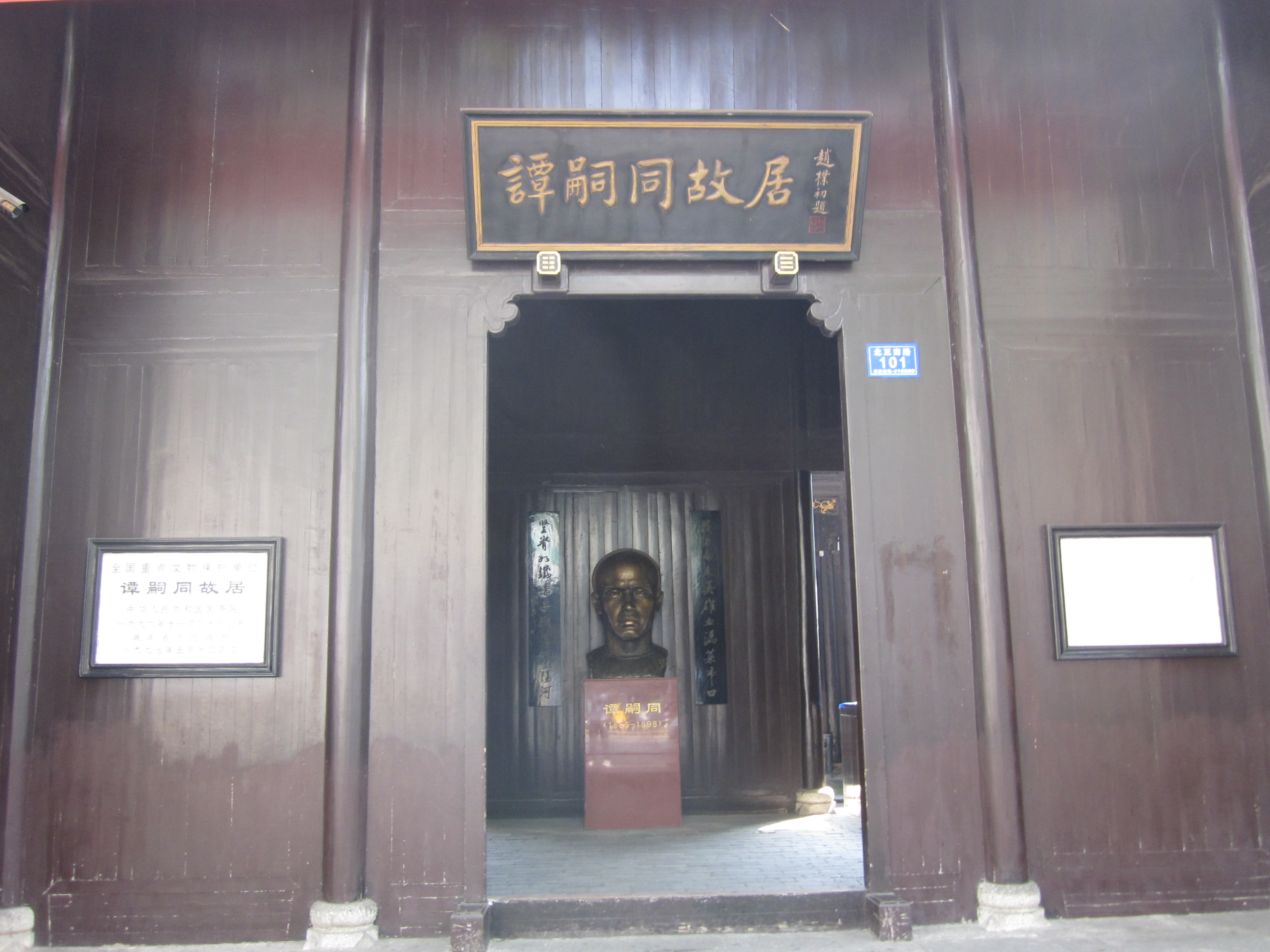
Former Residence of Tan Sitong.

Liuyang Confucius Temple.

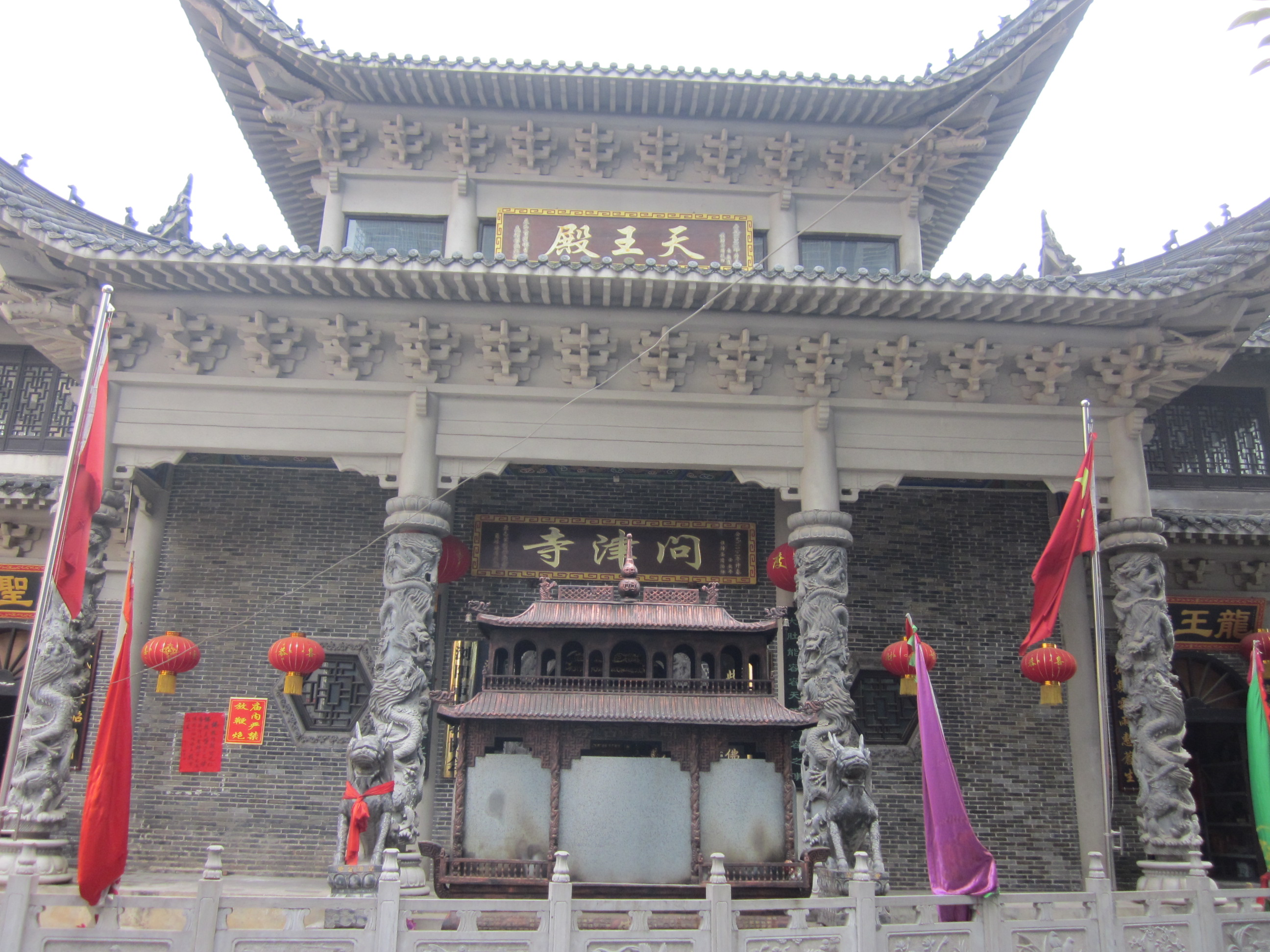
The Hall of Four Heavenly Kings at Wenjin Temple.

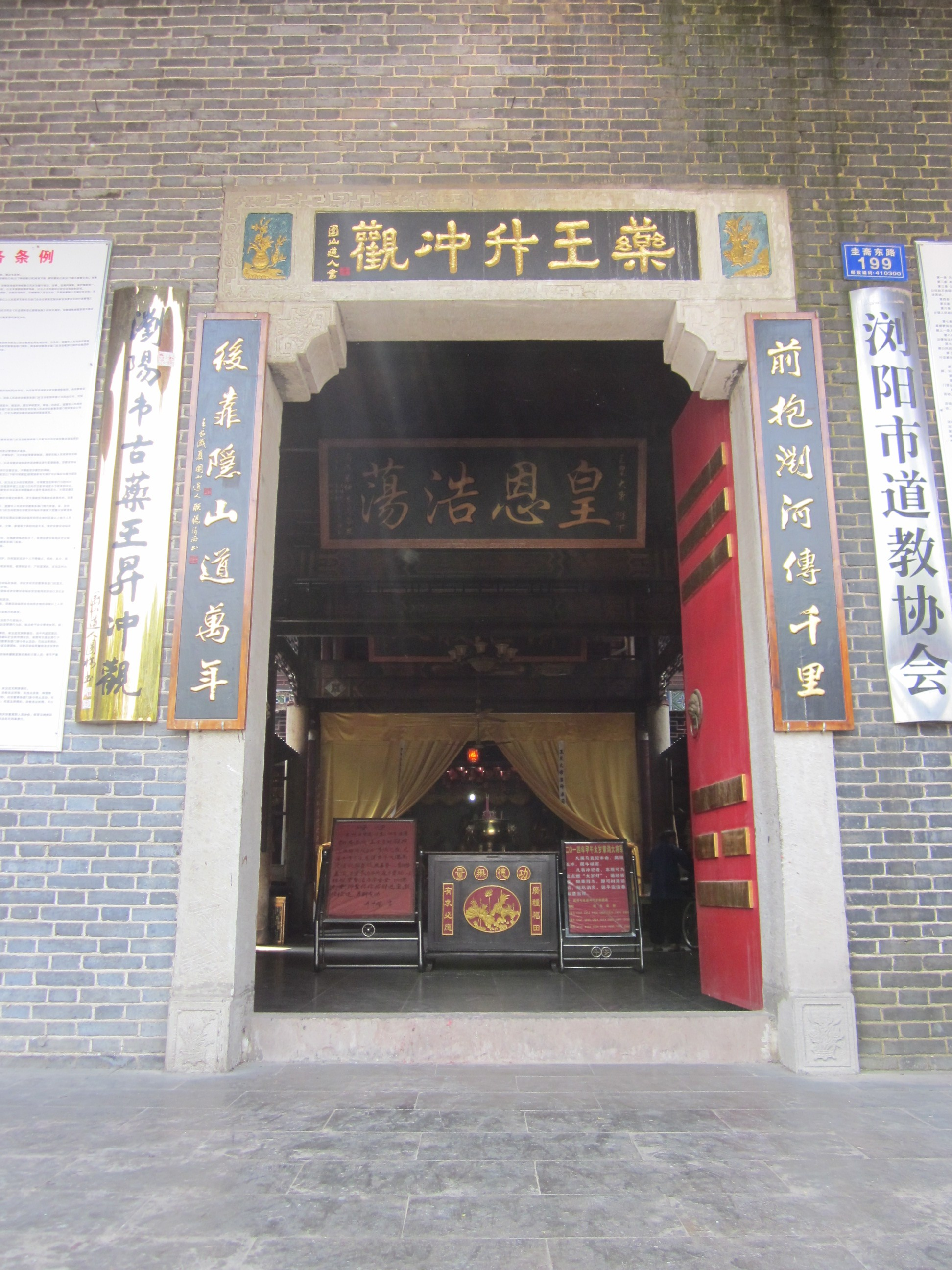
The entrance of Yaowang Shengchong Palace.

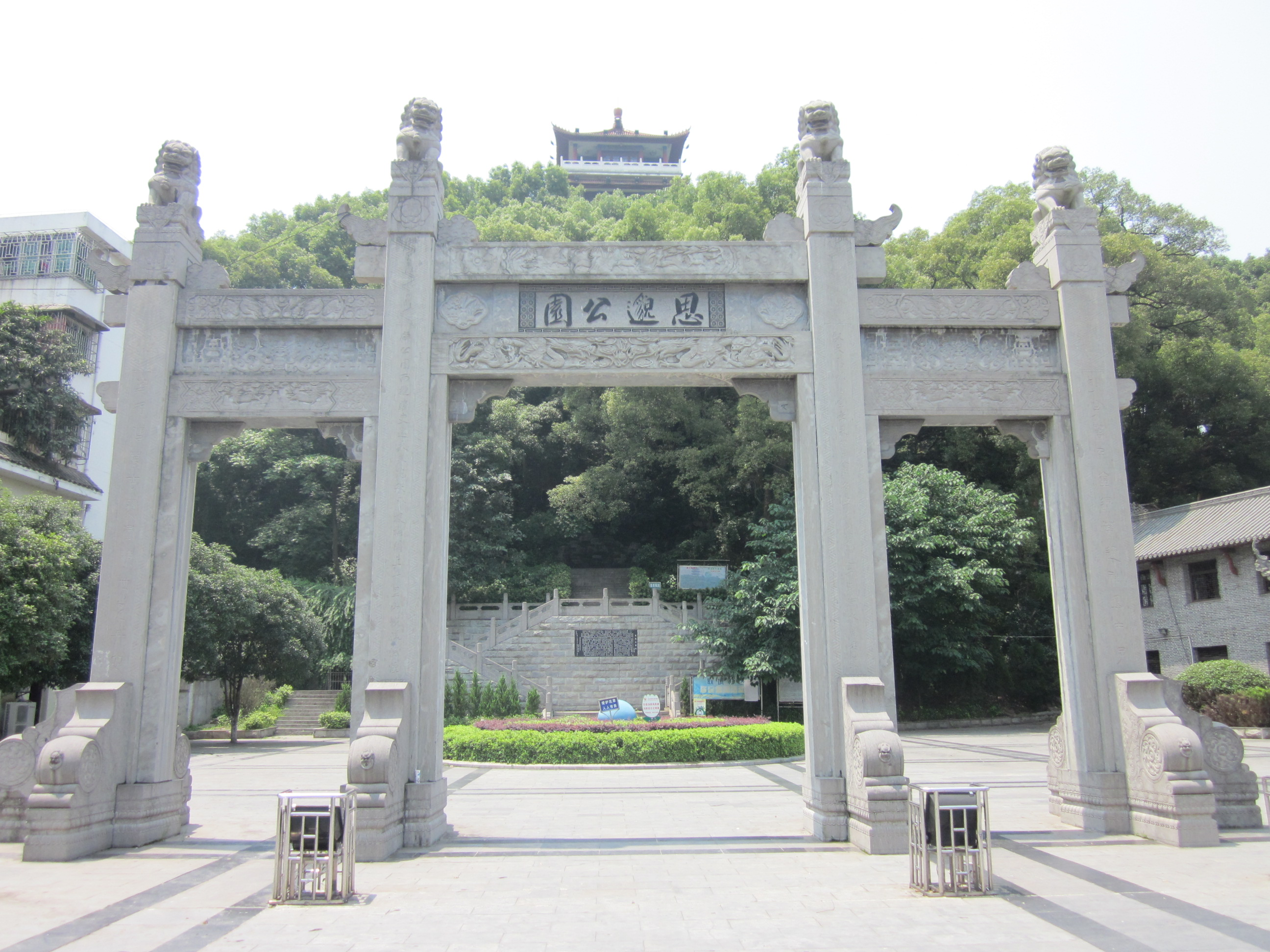
A paifang in front of Simiao Park.

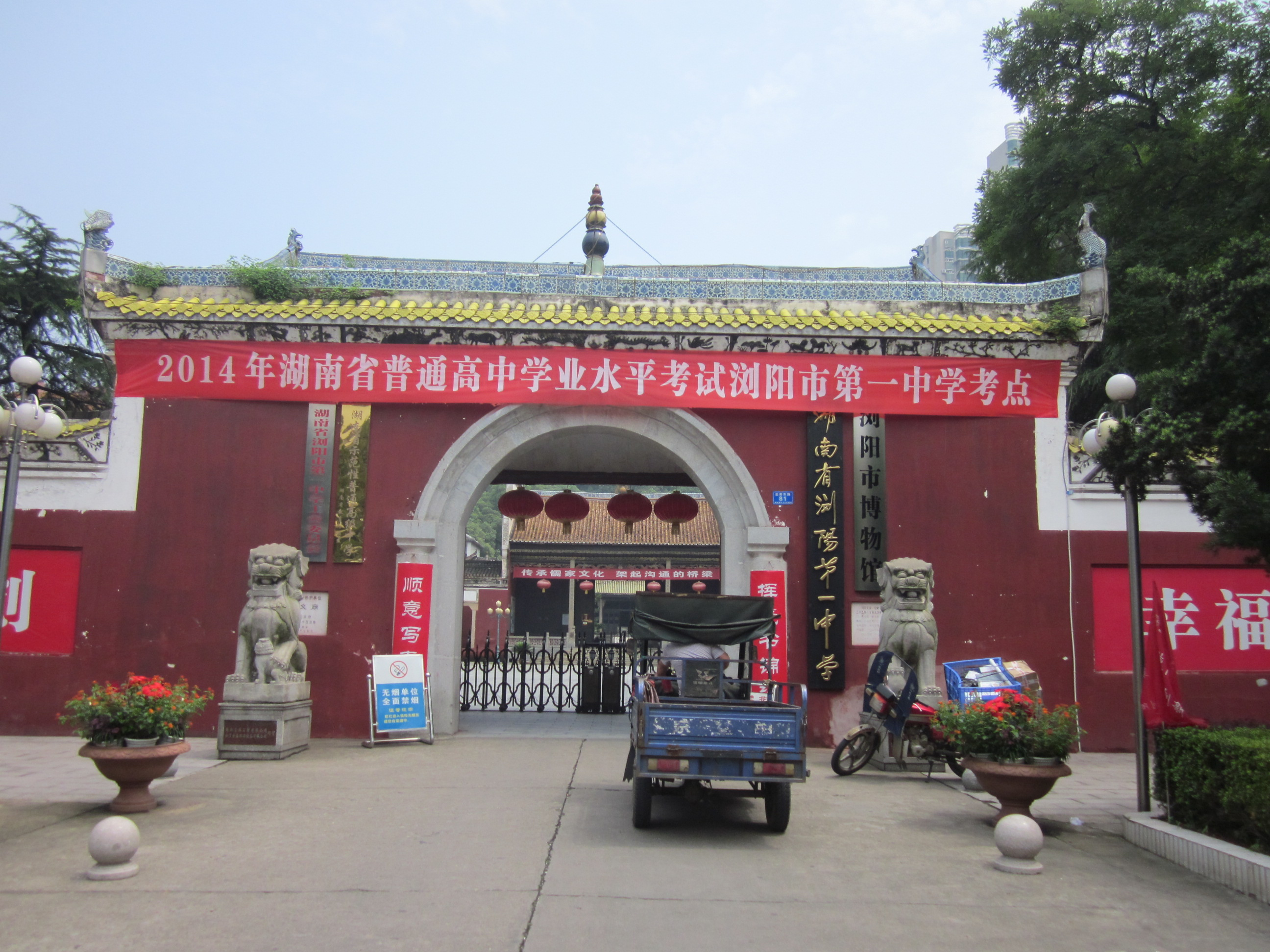
Liuyang No. 1 High School.
