= Xijiang (disambiguation) =

Xijiang may refer to:

a river in China

- Xijiang or Xi River (西江), the western tributary of the Pearl River in China.
- Xijiang or Xi River, a minor tributary of the Jiulong River northwest of Xiamen.

Townships in China

- Xijiang, Liuyang (溪江乡), a township which merged to Guankou subdistrict on November 18 2015, in Liuyang city, Hunan, China.
- Xijiang, Hengyang (溪江乡), a township of Hengyang County, Hunan, China.

Towns in China

- Xijiang, Guizhou (西江镇), a rural town in Leishan County, Guizhou, China.
