= Liuyang River =

River in Hunan, China

Coordinates: 28°14′56.78″N 112°58′22.72″E

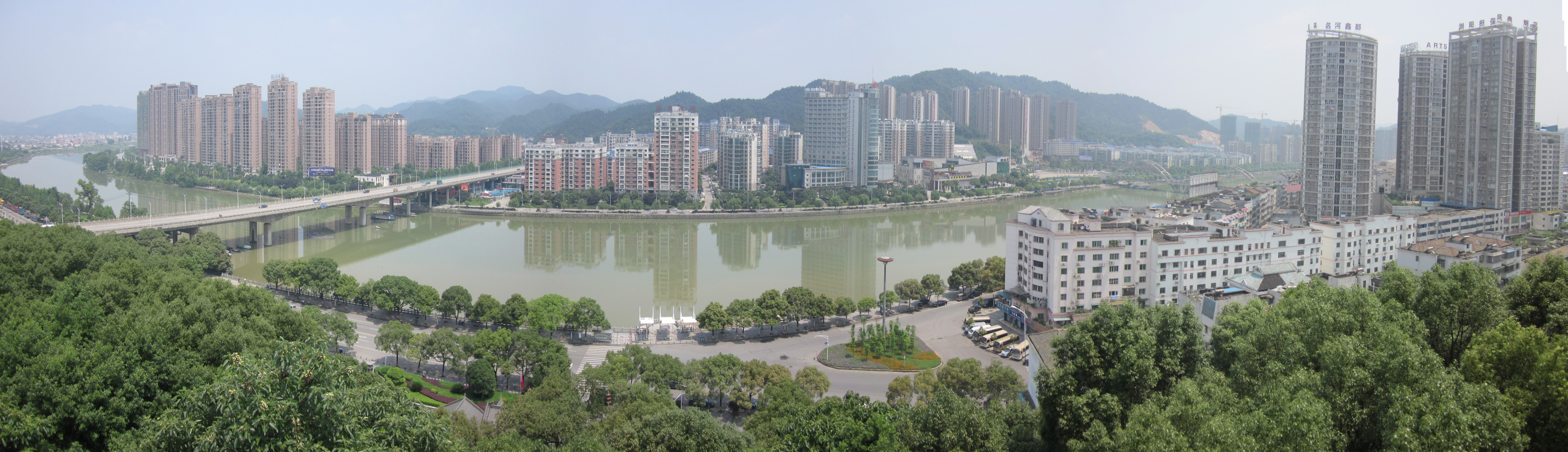
A panoramic view of Liuyang in 2014. The Liuyang River flows through Liuyang city.

The Liuyang River (simplified Chinese: 浏阳河; traditional Chinese: 瀏陽河; pinyin: Liúyánghé), also known as Liu River (simplified Chinese: 浏水; traditional Chinese: 瀏水) or Liuwei River (simplified Chinese: 浏渭河; traditional Chinese: 瀏渭河), is a right-bank tributary of Xiang River, and the largest tributary of Xiang River in Changsha, Hunan Province, China. The river has a length of 234.8 kilometres (145.9 mi) with its drainage area of 4,665 square kilometres (1,801 sq mi), accounting for 39.47% of the total area of Changsha, with surface water resources of 4,506 million cubic meters, accounting for 41.08% of that (as of 2014). It flows through Liuyang City, Changsha County, Yuhua, Furong and Kaifu Districts, and merges into Xiang River at Xinhe Delta Mouth (Chinese: 新河三角洲) of Kaifu District.

The Liuyang River flows generally east to west. It rises in the Dawei Mountains (Chinese: 大围山) of north Luoxiao Range, its main stream runs through more than 20 towns and townships. The Liuyang River has two source flows which are Daxi River (Chinese: 大溪河) and Xiaoxi River (Chinese: 小溪河), of which Daxi River is the main stream and its upper course.

== Course ==
Upper Liuyang River: The Daxi River (Chinese: 大溪河) is the main stream of upper courses of Liuyang River, it has a length of 108.82 kilometres (67.62 mi) with its drainage area of 1,284 square kilometres (496 sq mi). The river flows from the headwaters through Daweishan, Dahu, Guandu, Yanxi, Yonghe, Gugang and Gaoping 7 towns of Liuyang City to its confluence with the Xiaoxi River at Shuangjiang Village (Chinese: 双江村) of Gaoping Town. The Xiaoxi River (Chinese: 小溪河) is the south (left) head-stream of upper courses, it has a length of 110.58 kilometres (68.71 mi) with its drainage area of 783 square kilometres (302 sq mi). The river rises in the south of Dawei Mountains and runs through Zhangfang, Xiaohe and Gaoping.

Middle Liuyang River: The river is formally called the Liuyang River from the Daxi River's confluence with the Xiaoxi River at Shuangjiang of Gaoping. The middle section flows through Guankou, Hehua, Huaichuan, Jili, Chengchong, Puji and Zhentou.

Lower Liuyang River: The river is called the Lower Liuyang River from its confluence with the Jianjiang River (Chinese: 涧江) in the northeast of seat of Zhentou Town to its mouth at Xinhe Delta of Kaifu District. From the estuary of Jianjiang River (Chinese: 涧江) in Zhentou Town, the Liuyang River flows through Baijia of Liuyang City, Huangxing, Jiangbei Towns and Langli Subdistrict of Changsha County, Tiaoma Town, Dongshan and Lituo Subdistricts of Yuhua District, Mapoling, Huoxing, Donghu, Dong'an, Xianghu and Mawangdui Subdistricts of Furong District, Hongshan, Yuehu, Sifangping, Dongfenglu, Furongbeilu, Xinhe Subdistricts of Kaifu District.

== Culture ==
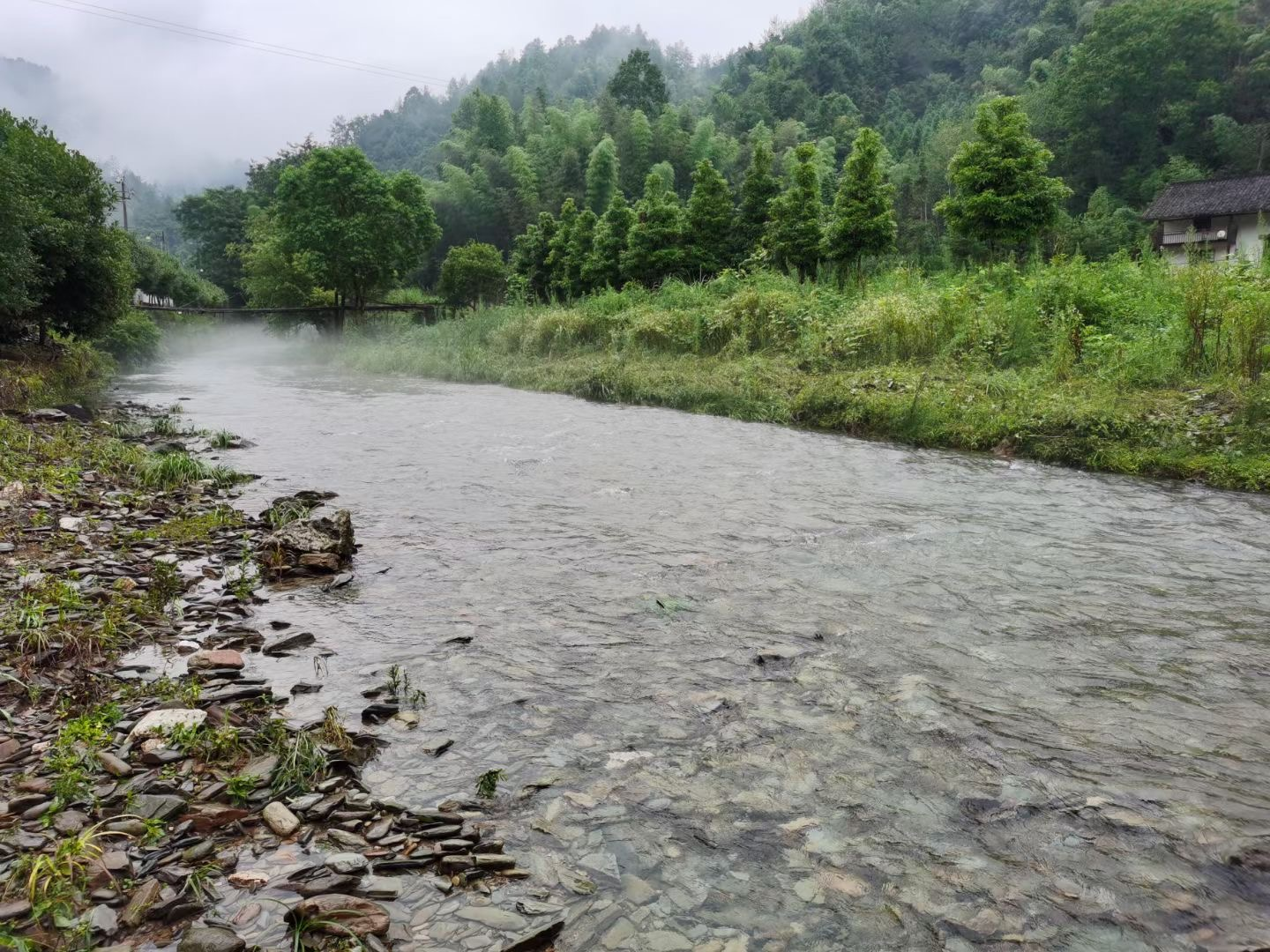
Liuyang River

A Chinese modern folk song, Liuyang River, was sung by Li Guyi.
