= Zhangfang =

Zhangfang (simplified Chinese: 张坊; traditional Chinese: 張坊; pinyin: Zhāngfǎng), may refer to:

- Zhangfang, Liuyang, a rural town in Liuyang, Hunan, China
- Zhangfang, Beijing, a suburban town in Fangshan District of Beijing, China
