= Chen Wenxin =

Chinese biologist (1926–2021)

- 陈文新
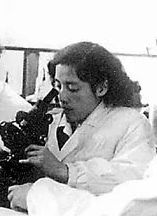
- Chen in 1954
- Born: 23 September 1926; Liuyang County, Hunan, Republic of China
- Died: 7 October 2021 (aged 95); Beijing, People's Republic of China
- Education: Wuhan University; Russian State Agrarian University - Moscow Timiryazev Agricultural Academy
- Scientific career
- Fields: Soil microorganisms Bacterial taxonomy
- Workplaces: China Agricultural University
- Doctoral advisor: Mikhail Fedorov
- Other academic advisors: Shi Shenghan; Gao Shangying (高尚英)

Chinese name
- Simplified Chinese: 陈文新
- Traditional Chinese: 陳文新
Transcriptions
Standard Mandarin
- Hanyu Pinyin: Chén Wénxīn
- IPA: [ʈʂʰə̌n wə̌n.ɕín]

Chen Wenxin (23 September 1926 – 7 October 2021) was a Chinese biologist specializing in soil microorganisms and bacterial taxonomy, and an academician of the Chinese Academy of Sciences. Some English-language sources cite her as "Wen Xin Chen" or as "Wen-Xin Chen".

== Biography ==
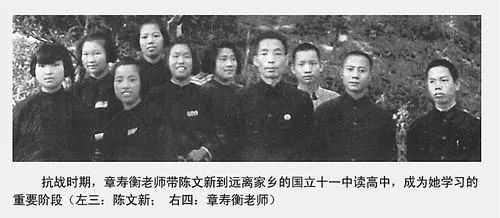
A group photo of Chen and her teacher and other students before going to National No. 11 High School

Chen was born in the town of Zhentou, Liuyang County, Hunan, on 23 September 1926, to Chen Chang, a classmate of Mao Zedong at Hunan First Normal University and revolutionary of the Chinese Communist Party, and Mao Bingqin (毛秉琴). Her father was killed by Kuomintang in Changsha in February 1930 when she was only three. She had two elder sisters. In 1942, she attended National No. 11 High School (now Yueyang No. 1 High School) in Yueyang. After graduating in 1945, she returned to her hometown to teach primary school for two years. In 1948, she enrolled at the Department of Agricultural Chemistry, National Wuhan University (now Wuhan University), where she graduated in 1952. In 1954, she was sent to study at the Russian State Agrarian University – Moscow Timiryazev Agricultural Academy on government scholarships, earning her vice-doctorate degree under the supervision of soviet microbiologist Mikhail Fedorov in 1958. Her thesis topic was "Comparative Study on the Physiological Characteristics of Nitrogen-fixing Bacteria with and Without Spores."

Chen returned to China in 1959 and taught at Beijing Agricultural University (now China Agricultural University). From 1982 to 1983, she was a visiting scholar at Cornell University. She was elected to the Chinese Academy of Sciences in 2001.

On 7 October 2021, she died from an illness in Beijing, aged 95.

== Contributions ==
Chen established the first modern bacterial molecular classification laboratory in China. She put forward new ideas to deny the traditional concepts of "host specificity" of rhizobia and "interracial race" with plants. She founded the world's largest rhizobium resource database in China, whose number of strains and host plant species ranked first in the world. She established a set of scientific Rhizobium classification, identification technical methods and data processing procedures. She proved the diversity of symbiotic relationship between rhizobia and legumes, and revealed the great difference in symbiotic effectiveness between near source strains and different varieties of plants, she also put forward new ideas on the evolution of symbiotic mechanism of rhizobia, and found that mixed planting between gramineous plants and legumes can eliminate the obstacle of "nitrogen repression" of rhizobia, and the two interact to produce high yield.

== Honours and awards ==
- 2001 State Natural Science Award (Second Class) for diversity, taxonomy and phylogeny of legume rhizobia resources in China
- 2001 Member of the Chinese Academy of Sciences

The genus Wenxinia was named in her honour.
