= Yaowang Shengchong Palace =

Taoist temple in Liuyang, Hunan, China

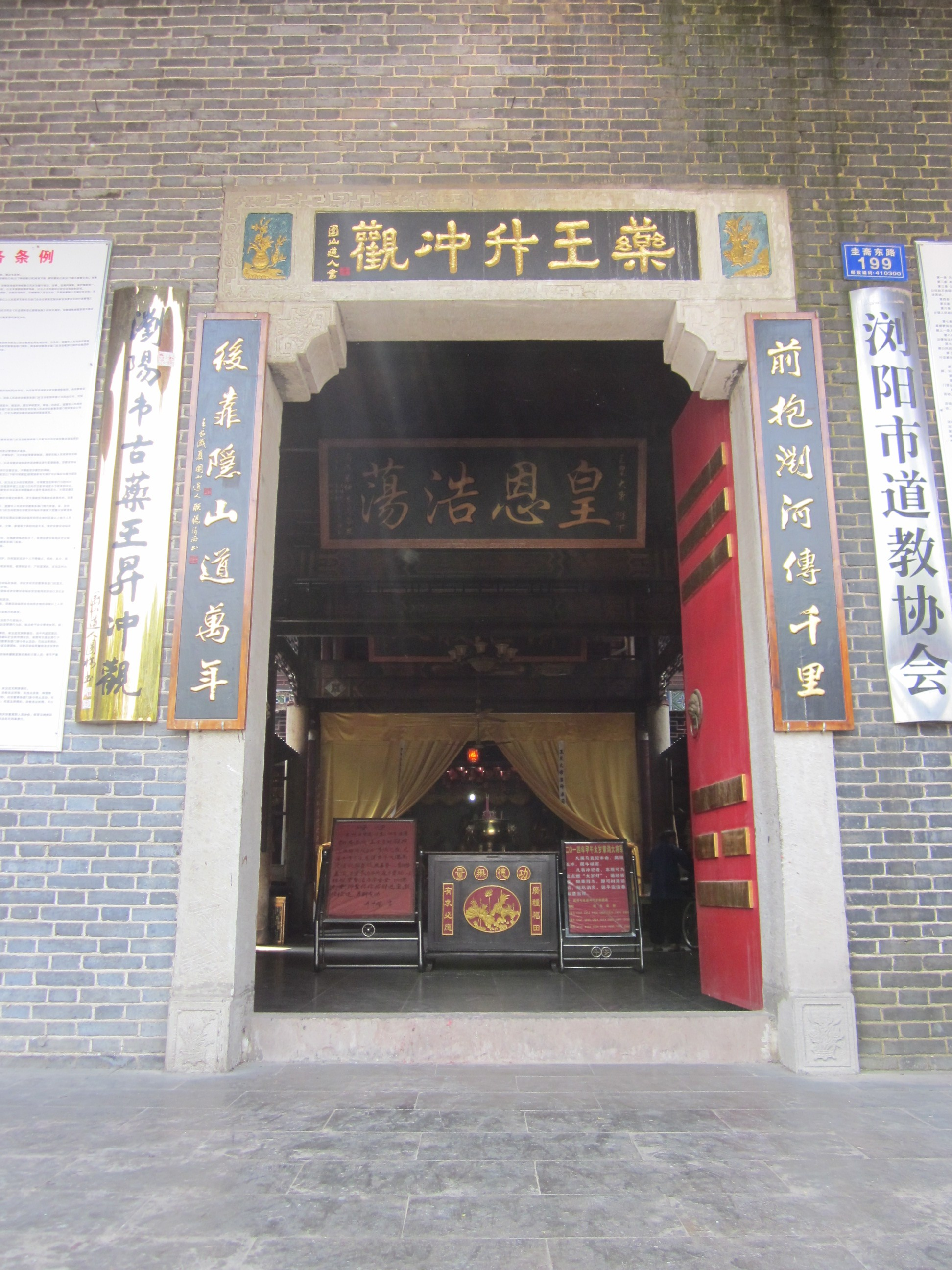
- The Front Hall.

- Location within Hunan Location within China

Religion
- Sect: Taoism
- District: Liuyang
- Province: Hunan

Location
- Country: China
- Interactive map of Yaowang Shengchong Palace
- Coordinates: 28°09′4.0176″N 113°38′43.0224″E

Architecture
- Established: Tang dynasty

Yaowang Shengchong Palace (simplified Chinese: 药王升冲观; traditional Chinese: 藥王昇沖觀; pinyin: Yàowāng Shēngchōngguàn) is a Taoist temple located on the northeast side of Sunyin Hill (孙隐山), beside the Liuyang River, in Liuyang, Hunan, China. The temple was first established in Tang dynasty (618-907), and the modern temple was founded in 2001 by the local government. The temple covers a total area of 4,800 square metres (52,000 sq ft), with more than 3,600 square metres (39,000 sq ft) of floor space.

== History ==
Yaowang Shengchong Palace was originally built in the Tang dynasty (618-907) and named after Sun Simiao, also known as King of Medicine (药王) who lived in seclusion here.

The temple was destroyed in the 26th Year of Period Zhizheng (1366) in the Yuan dynasty.

In the 3rd Year of Period Hongwu (1370) in Ming dynasty, a Taoist priest who named Wang Tanran (王坦然) collected money to rebuild the temple. In the 8th Year of Period Xuande (1433), it became a temple of Dragon Gate Taoism. In the 5th Year of Period Tianqi (1625), abbot Peng Siwei (彭思伟) restored the temple.

The temple had a statue of Sun Simiao with 2.3 meters in height. In 1958, the local government vandalized the statue in the name of breaking down the feudal superstition.

In 1960, the Liuyang County Handicraft Cooperatives (浏阳县手工艺联社) founded a galvanized wire factory in the temple. It was reconstruction in 2001 and became the site of Liuyang Daoist Association.

== Gallery ==
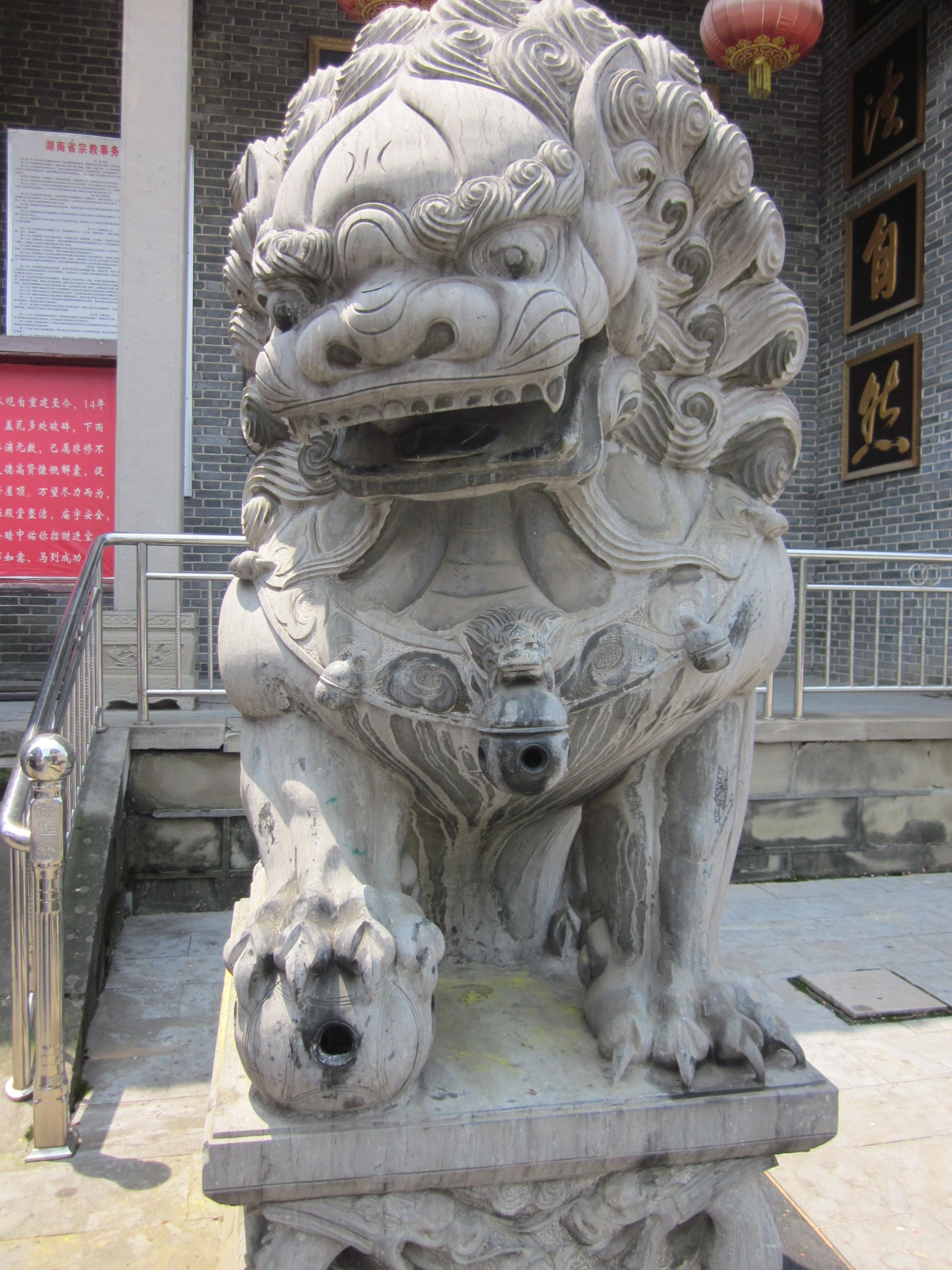
A Chinese guardian lion in front of the temple.

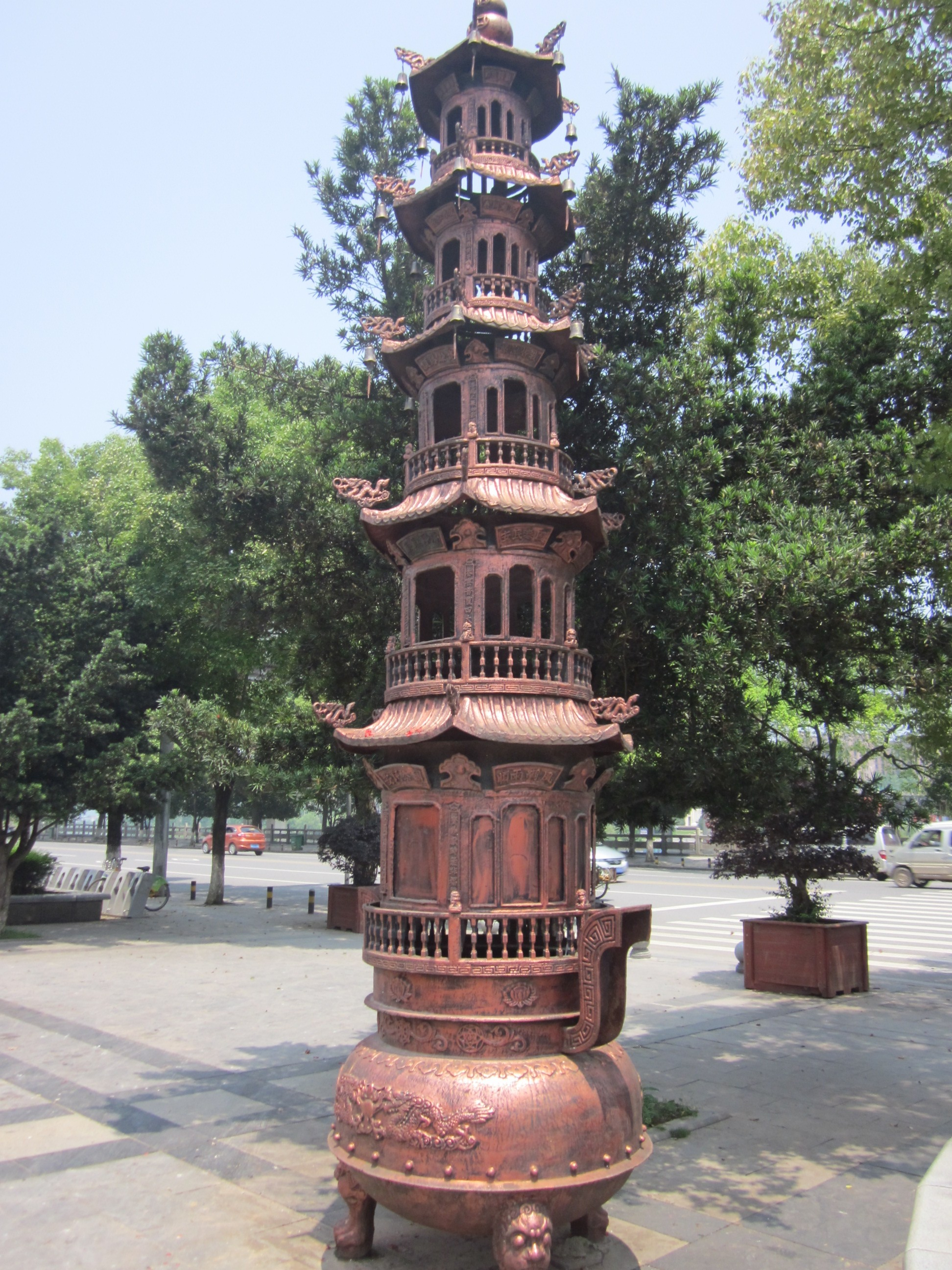
A Xianglu in front of the temple.

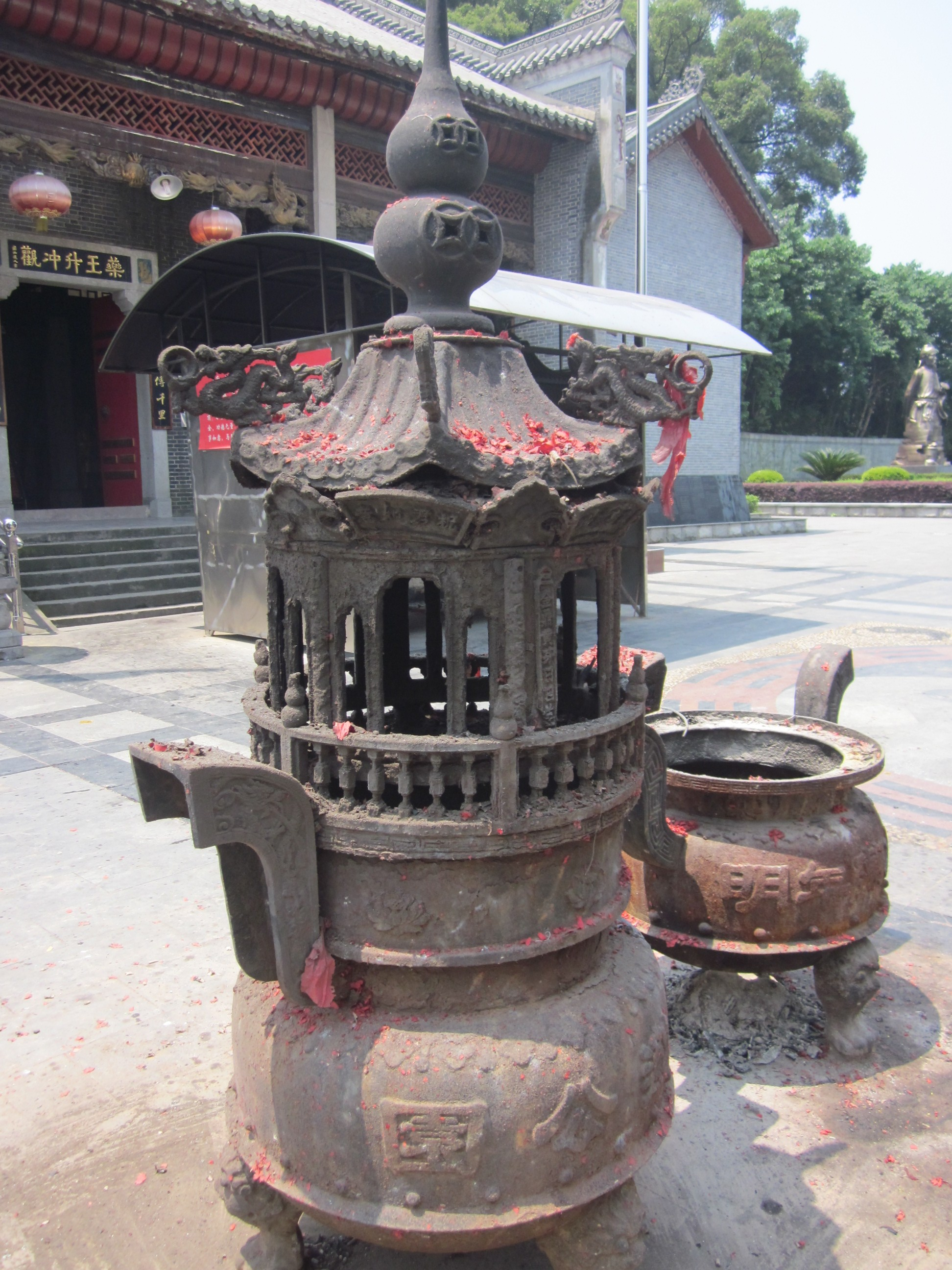
A Xianglu in front of the temple.

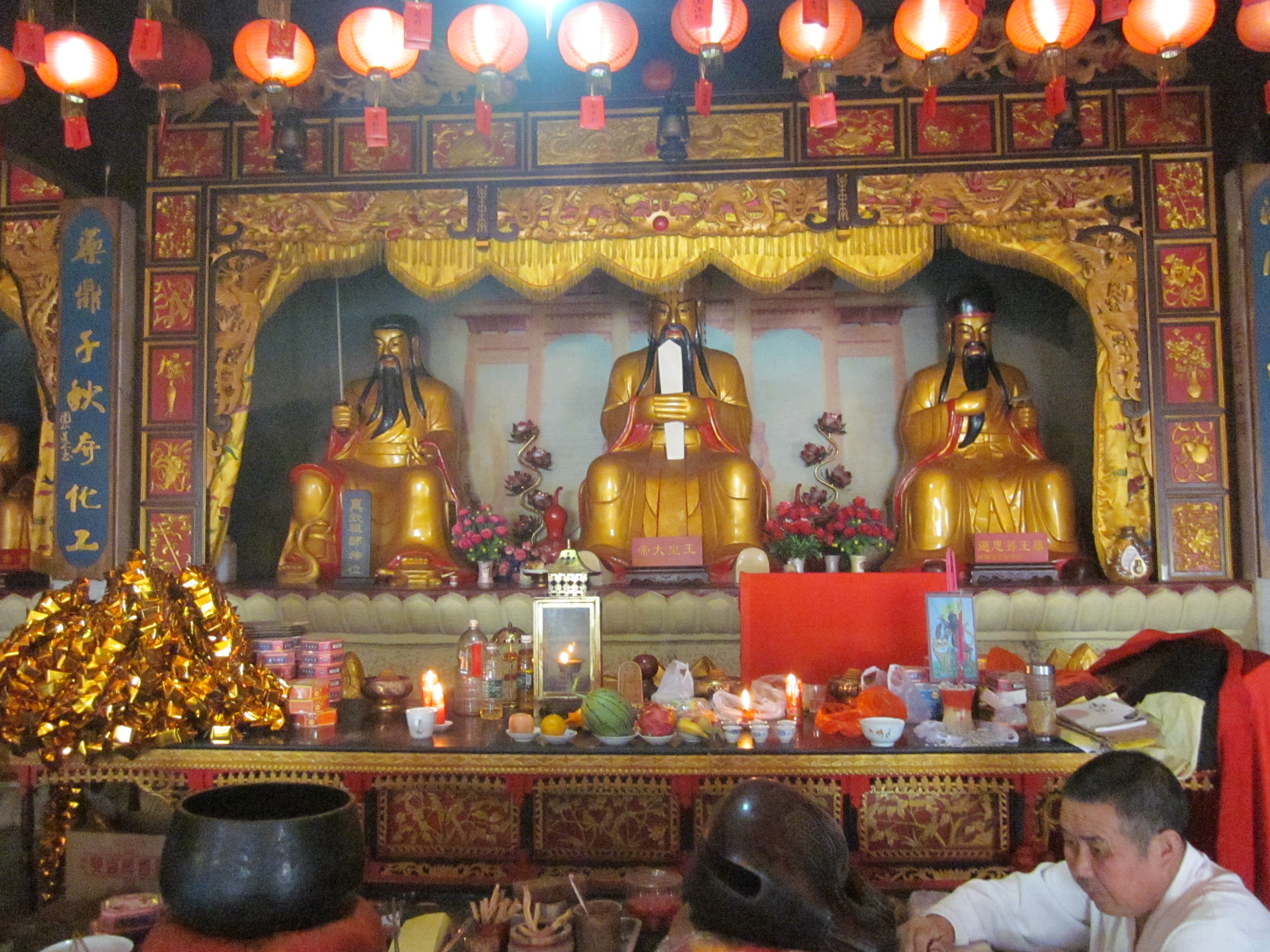
The Jade Emperor (middle), the Zhenwu Great Emperor (left) and Sun Simiao (right) at the shrine.

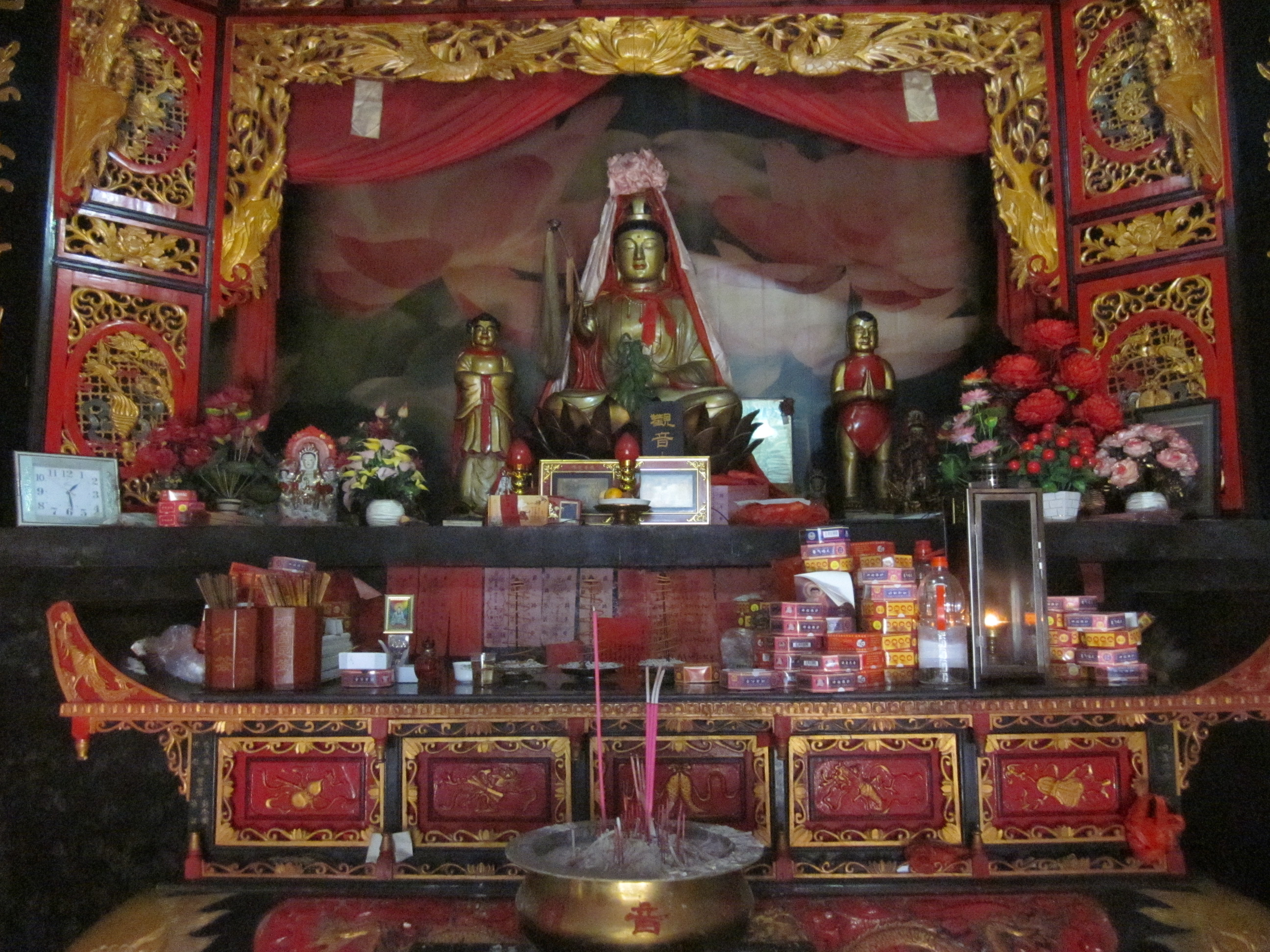
The Statue of Guanyin at the temple.

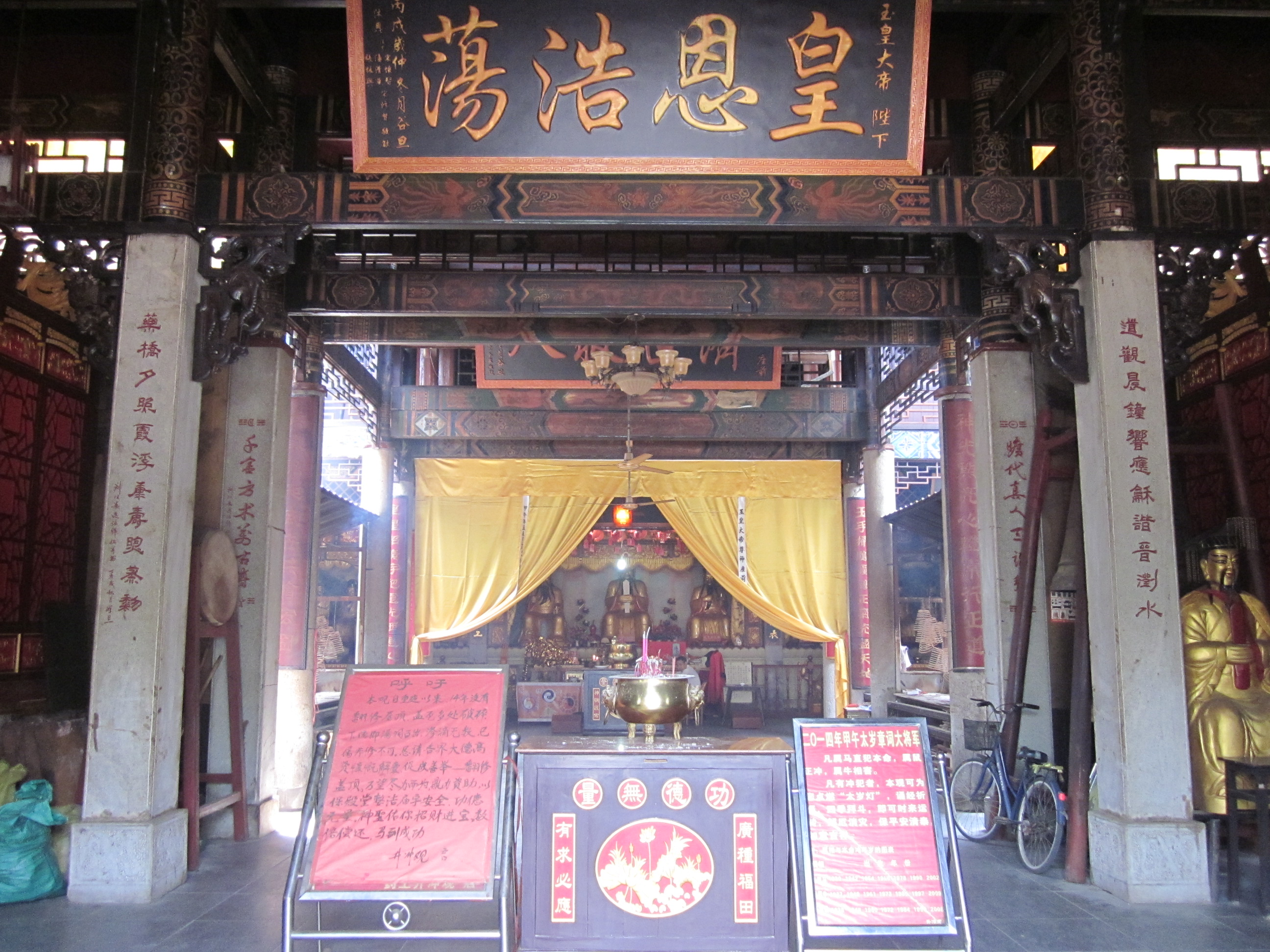
The Front Hall.
