= Wenxinia saemankumensis =

Scientific classification
- Domain: Bacteria
- Kingdom: Pseudomonadati
- Phylum: Pseudomonadota
- Class: Alphaproteobacteria
- Order: Rhodobacterales
- Family: Rhodobacteraceae
- Genus: Wenxinia
- Species: W. saemankumensis

Binomial name
- Wenxinia saemankumensis Park et al. 2014

Type strain
- CECT 8456, KCTC 32548, S-22

Species of bacterium

Wenxinia saemankumensis is a Gram-negative and non-motile bacterium from the genus of Wenxinia which has been isolated from tidal flat sediments from Saemankum in Korea.
