= Xijiang, Liuyang =

Town in Liuyang, Hunan, China

Coordinates: 28.2808°N 113.6874°E

Xijiang Township (simplified Chinese: 溪江乡; traditional Chinese: 溪江鄉; pinyin: Xijiang Xiang), is a rural township in Liuyang City, Changsha City, Hunan Province, People's Republic of China. As of the 2000 census it had a population of 19,952 and an area of 90.6 square kilometers. Xijiang township merged to Guankou subdistrict on November 18, 2015.

== Cityscape ==
The township is divided into 9 villages, the following areas: Xijiang Village, Jiangtian Village, Changxi Village, Zhujiang Village, Tanpeng Village, Jinlong Village, Futian Village, Xinhu Village, and Xianyuan Village (溪江村、浆田村、长溪村、珠江村、炭棚村、金龙村、福田村、新湖村、仙源村).
