= Baijia, Liuyang =

Town in Hunan, China

Baijia Town 柏加镇
- Town
- Location in Hunan
- Coordinates: 28°03′10″N 113°13′44″E
- Country: People's Republic of China
- Province: Hunan
- Prefecture-level city: Changsha
- County-level city: Liuyang

Area
  - Total: 87.5 km^{2} (33.8 sq mi)

Population (2015)
  - Total: 26,000
  - Density: 300/km^{2} (770/sq mi)
- Time zone: UTC+8 (China Standard)
- Postal code: 410321
- Area code: 0731

Baijia Town (simplified Chinese: 柏加镇; traditional Chinese: 柏加鎮; pinyin: Bǎijiā Zhèn) is a rural town under the administration of Liuyang City, Hunan Province, People's Republic of China. According to the 2015 census, it had a population of 26,000 and an area of 87.5 square kilometres (33.8 sq mi). It borders Jiangbei Town of Changsha County in the north, Zhentou Town in the east and southeast, Yuntian Town of Zhuzhou in the south, and Huangxing Town in the west.

== Administrative divisions ==
The town is divided into four villages and one community:

- Bailing Community (柏铃社区)
- Dutou Village (渡头村)
- Nanzhou Village (楠洲村)
- Xianhu Village (仙湖村)
- Shuangyuan Village (双源村)

== Geography ==
Liuyang River, also known as the mother river, flows through the town.

Xianrenzao Reservoir (仙人造水库) is the largest reservoir and largest water body in the town.

Mount Chenjialing (陈家岭) is the peak-point in the town, its peak elevation is 234.2 metres (768 ft).

== Economy ==
The principal industries in the area are agriculture, granite, limestone and fireworks.

== Education ==
- Baijia Middle School

== Transportation ==
=== Railway ===
The Shanghai–Kunming railway, from Shanghai to Kunming, runs through the town.

The Hangzhou–Changsha high-speed railway, which connects Hangzhou and Changsha, runs through the town.

=== County Road ===
The County Road X030 passes across the town west to east.

== Attractions ==
The main attractions are the Former Residence of Chen Xi (陈熹故居) and the Temple of General (将军庙). Moreover, the Xianrenzao Reservoir (仙人造水库) is a famous tourist spot nowadays.
