= Chengchong, Liuyang =

Chengchong Town 枨冲镇
- Town
- Location in Hunan
- Coordinates: 28°02′19″N 113°30′05″E
- Country: People's Republic of China
- Province: Hunan
- Prefecture-level city: Changsha
- County-level city: Liuyang

Area
  - Total: 186.3 km^{2} (71.9 sq mi)

Population (2015)
  - Total: 44,800
  - Density: 240/km^{2} (623/sq mi)
- Time zone: UTC+8 (China Standard)
- Postal code: 410316
- Area code: 0731

Chengchong Town (simplified Chinese: 枨冲镇; traditional Chinese: 棖沖鎮; pinyin: Chéngchōng Zhèn) is an urban town under the administration of Liuyang City, Hunan Province, People's Republic of China. According to the 2015 census, it had a population of 44,800 and an area of 186.3 square kilometres (71.9 sq mi). The town is bordered to the north by Jili Subdistrict, to the northeast by Hehua Subdistrict, to the south by Guanzhuang Town of Liling, to the west and southeast by Dayao Town, to the southwest by Puji Town, and to the northwest by Gejia Town.

== History ==
The town was established in 1992.

In 1995, former Chengchong Town and Qingcao Township (青草乡) merged to form the new Chengchong Town.

== Administrative divisions ==
The town is divided into seven villages and two communities:

- Qingcao Community (青草社区)
- Chengchong Community (枨冲社区)
- Pingxi Village (平息村)
- Caichang Village (才常村)
- Heping Village (和平村)
- Sanyuan Village (三元村)
- Xinnanqiao Village (新南桥村)
- Yajishan Village (牙际山村)
- Jiahe Village (佳和村)

== Geography ==
Liuyang River, also known as the mother river, flows through the town northeast to southwest.

Mountains located adjacent to and visible from the townsite are: Mount Guanggang (黄岗岭; 416 metres (1,365 ft)) and Mount Qiyajianxi (七鸦尖西; 463.1 metres (1,519 ft)).

== Economy ==
Agriculture and fireworks play important roles in the local economy.

== Education ==
- Chengchong Middle School

== Transportation ==
The town is connected to two county roads: X008 and X016.

== Notable people ==
- Tang Caichang (1867–1900), a late Qing reformer and political activist.
- Tang Caizhong (1873–1900), Tang Caichang's young brother, political activist.
- Li Shangwen (黎尚雯; 1868–1918), scholar.
- Yu Zhaochang (余昭常; 1867–1911), political activist.
