= Puji, Liuyang =

Puji Town 普迹镇
- Town
- Location in Hunan
- Coordinates: 27°58′54″N 113°23′43″E
- Country: People's Republic of China
- Province: Hunan
- Prefecture-level city: Changsha
- County-level city: Liuyang

Area
  - Total: 176.5 km^{2} (68.1 sq mi)

Population (2015)
  - Total: 41,900
  - Density: 237/km^{2} (615/sq mi)
- Time zone: UTC+8 (China Standard)
- Postal code: 410636
- Area code: 0731

Puji Town (simplified Chinese: 普迹镇; traditional Chinese: 普跡鎮; pinyin: Pǔjì Zhèn) is a rural town in Liuyang City, Hunan Province, People's Republic of China. As of the 2015 census it had a population of 41,900 and an area of 176.5 square kilometres (68.1 sq mi). It borders Gejia Town in the north, Zhentou Town in the northwest, Guanqiao Town in the west, Guanzhuang Town of Liling in the south, and Chengchong Town in the east.

== Administrative divisions ==
The town is divided into six villages and three communities, which include the following areas:

- Xinfu Community (新府社区)
- Jinjiang Community (金江社区)
- Xinjie Community (新街社区)
- Putai Village (普泰村)
- Puhua Village (普花村)
- Shuyuan New Village (书院新村)
- Dajitou Village (大鸡头村)
- Wufeng Village (五丰村)
- Puguan Village (普官村)

== Geography ==
Liuyang River, also known as the mother river, flows through the town.

There are a number of popular mountains located immediately adjacent to the townsite which include Mount Jiziling (鸡子岭; 142 metres (466 ft)); Mount Huangmaojian (黄茅尖; 725 metres (2,379 ft)) and Mount Baimaojian (白毛尖; 597.8 metres (1,961 ft)).

== Economy ==
The principal industries in the area are agriculture, forestry and fireworks.

== Education ==
- Puji Middle School

== Transportation ==
=== Expressway ===
The Liuyang-Liling Expressway in Hunan leads to Liling through the town.

=== County roads ===
The town is connected to three county roads: X016, X017 and X018.

== Religion ==
Wanshou Palace (万寿宫) is a Taoist temple situated at the town.

== Attractions ==
Jiazhou Isle (夹洲岛) is a well-known scenic spot. Besides, the Jinjiang military education centre (金江军事教育基地), which is formally the No. 7 senior high school of Liuyang, is also an important tourist spot in Puji town.

== Notable people ==
- Ouyang Zhonghu (欧阳中鹄), educator.
- He Jishan (何继善), an academician of the Chinese Academy of Engineering.
