= Wenxinia =

Scientific classification
- Domain: Bacteria
- Kingdom: Pseudomonadati
- Phylum: Pseudomonadota
- Class: Alphaproteobacteria
- Order: Rhodobacterales
- Family: Rhodobacteraceae
- Genus: Wenxinia; Ying et al. 2007

Type species
- Wenxinia marina

Species
- W. marina W. saemankumensis

Genus of bacteria

Wenxinia is a genus of bacteria from the family of Rhodobacteraceae. It is named for biologist Chen Wenxin.
