= Wenxinia marina =

Scientific classification
- Domain: Bacteria
- Kingdom: Pseudomonadati
- Phylum: Pseudomonadota
- Class: Alphaproteobacteria
- Order: Rhodobacterales
- Family: Rhodobacteraceae
- Genus: Wenxinia
- Species: W. marina

Binomial name
- Wenxinia marina Ying et al. 2007

Type strain
- CGMCC 1.6105, DSM 24838, JCM 14017

Species of bacterium

Wenxinia marina is a Gram-negative, aerobic and heterotrophic bacterium from the genus of Wenxinia which has been isolated from sediment from the Xijiang oilfield of the South China Sea in China.
