= Zhentou, Liuyang =

Zhentou 镇头镇
- Town
- Location in Hunan
- Coordinates: 28°00′34″N 113°19′26″E
- Country: People's Republic of China
- Province: Hunan
- Prefecture-level city: Changsha
- County-level city: Liuyang

Area
  - Total: 158.8 km^{2} (61.3 sq mi)

Population (2015)
  - Total: 57,100
  - Density: 360/km^{2} (931/sq mi)
- Time zone: UTC+08:00 (China Standard)
- Postal code: 410319
- Area code: 0731

Zhentou Town (simplified Chinese: 镇头镇; traditional Chinese: 鎮頭鎮; pinyin: Zhèntóu Zhèn) is a rural town in Liuyang City, Hunan Province, People's Republic of China. As of the 2015 census it had a population of 57,100 and an area of 158.8 square kilometres (61.3 sq mi). It is bordered to the north by Jiangbei Town, to the east by towns of Puji, Gejia and Guanqiao, to the south by Lusong District and Hetang District of Zhuzhou, and to the west by Baijia Town.

== Administrative divisions ==
The town is divided into eight villages and two communities, which include the following areas:

- Tianping Community (田坪社区)
- Beixing Community (北星社区)
- Gankou Village (干口村)
- Jinpai Village (金牌村)
- Yuelong Village (跃龙村)
- Jiangdong Village (江东村)
- Baishu Village (柏树村)
- Jintian Village (金田村)
- Gantang Village (甘棠村)
- Shuangqiao Village (双桥村)

== Economy ==
The main industries in and around the town are food processing, vegetables, fruits and animal farming.

== Geography ==
Liuyang River, more commonly known as the "mother river", flows through the town.

There are two reservoirs within the town: Xianrenzao Reservoir (仙人造水库) and Gantang Reservoir (甘棠水库).

Mountain located adjacent to and visible from the townsite are: Jiziling (鸡子岭).

== Education ==
There is one middle school and one high school in the town: Zhentou Middle School and Liuyang No. 5 High School, both are public schools.

== Transportation ==
=== Railway ===
The Shanghai–Kunming railway, from Shanghai to Kunming, through the town.

The Hangzhou–Changsha high-speed railway, which connects Hangzhou and Changsha, runs through the town.

=== Expressway ===
Two expressways run through the town: Liuyang–Liling Expressway and Shanghai–Kunming Expressway.

=== Provincial Highway ===
The Provincial Highway S211 runs southwest to northeast through the town.

== Attractions ==
Three Tourism development zones located in the town: Zhongfo Temple (钟佛寺), Baibu Isle (百步洲) and Daji (大基).

== Celebrity ==
- Chen Zhangfu, revolutionary of the Chinese Communist Party.
- Chen Wenxin, biologist and academician of the Chinese Academy of Sciences.
