= Zhangfang, Liuyang =

Zhangfang Town 张坊镇
- Town
- Location in Hunan
- Coordinates: 28°19′38″N 114°05′57″E
- Country: People's Republic of China
- Province: Hunan
- Prefecture-level city: Changsha
- County-level city: Liuyang

Area
  - Total: 319.3 km^{2} (123.3 sq mi)

Population (2015)
  - Total: 31,800
  - Density: 99.6/km^{2} (258/sq mi)
- Time zone: UTC+8 (China Standard)
- Postal code: 410308
- Area code: 0731

Zhangfang Town (simplified Chinese: 张坊镇; traditional Chinese: 張坊鎮; pinyin: Zhāngfǎng Zhèn) is a rural town in Liuyang City, Hunan Province, People's Republic of China. As of the 2015 census, it had a population of 31,800 and an area of 319.3 square kilometres (123.3 sq mi). It borders Daweishan Town in the north, Paibu Town in the east, the towns of Yonghe, Guandu, and Dahu in the west, and Xiaohe Township in the south.

== Administrative divisions ==
The town is divided into seven villages and two communities, which include the following areas:

- Shanghong Community (上洪社区)
- Zhangjiafang Community (张家坊社区)
- Baishi Village (白石村)
- Chalin Village (茶林村)
- Fuxi Village (富溪村)
- Tianxi Village (田溪村)
- Jiangkou Village (江口村)
- Chenqiao Village (陈桥村)
- Renxi Village (人溪村)

== Geography ==
The Xiaoxi River (小溪河), a river in eastern Liuyang that rises in the town and discharges to Zhushuqiao Reservoir (株树桥水库).

The Banli Reservoir (板栗水库) is situated at the southwest of the town.

Mount Qixingling (七星岭) is the peak-point at the town, its peak elevation is 1,607.8 metres (5,275 ft).

Mount Getengling (葛藤岭) is 851.2 metres (2,793 ft) in elevation and Mount Litouling (立头岭) is 832.4 metres (2,731 ft) in elevation.

== Economy ==
The economy is supported primarily by farming and ranching.

== Education ==
- Zhangfang Middle School

== Language ==
Mandarin is the official provincial language and local people speak Hakka Chinese.

== Transportation ==
=== Railway ===
The Haoji Railway, from Uxin Banner of Inner Mongolia to Ji'an of Jiangxi, through the town.

=== Expressway ===
The Changsha–Liuyang Expressway, from Changsha, running through the towns of Dongyang, Jiaoxi, Gugang, Sankou, Yonghe, Guandu to Jiangxi.

=== Provincial Highway ===
The Provincial Highway S309, which heads west to Jiangxi and east to Changsha, runs through the town.

== Attractions ==
Honglian Temple (红莲寺; 'Temple of Red Lotus') is a Buddhist temple in the town.

Chen Zhenren Temple (陈真人庙) is a Taoist temple in the town.

The Former Residence of Wang Shoudao and the Former Residence of Li Bai are famous scenic spots in the town.

== Notable people ==
- Li Bai (spy), a famous spy of the Chinese Communist Party.
- Wang Shoudao, a politician who served as Governor of Hunan, Minister of Transport and Chinese People's Political Consultative Conference Committee Chairman of Guangdong.
- Zhang Fan (张藩), lieutenant general in the People's Liberation Army.
