= Libai Huang =

Chinese-American chemist

- Education: Peking University; University of Rochester
- Scientific career
- Workplaces: Purdue University; Argonne National Laboratory
- Thesis: Ultrafast nonlinear optical spectroscopy of single-walled carbon nanotubes (2006)

Libai Huang (Chinese: 黄立白) is a Chinese-American chemist who is a professor at Purdue University. She is interested in unravelling the structure-property relationships of next-generation solar materials.

== Early life and education ==
Huang earned a doctorate BS from Peking University in 2001 and a PhD from University of Rochester in 2006. Her doctorate developed ultrafast nonlinear optical spectroscopy of single-wall carbon nanotubes. Huang then joined Argonne National Laboratory as a postdoctoral fellow.

== Research and career ==
Huang joined the faculty at Purdue University. In 2011, she was a Kavli Foundation Fellow. Her research considers the development of ultrafast, spatially resolved spectroscopies to understand charge transport in the active layers of solar cells. She has developed ultrafast spectroscopic probes that can be combined with optical microscopes to achieve nm-resolution high frequency temporal information, so-called ultrafast nanoscopy. When it comes to imaging the active layers of solar cells, Huang has studied exciton formation and charge transport at femtosecond timescales. She tracked the hot carriers that form in perovskite solar cells, and showed that they can travel hundreds of nanometers (lasting around 100 picoseconds) before decaying as heat. In singlet fission materials, Huang identified singlet-mediate triplet transport mechanisms, which can cause long-range triplet diffusion. She makes use of optical pump-probe techniques to understand two-dimensional materials.

In 2021, Huang joined a United States Department of Energy effort to develop new materials for quantum technology.

== Selected publications ==
- Hongyan Shi; Rusen Yan; Simone Bertolazzi; et al. (7 January 2013). "Exciton dynamics in suspended monolayer and few-layer MoS₂ 2D crystals". ACS Nano. 7 (2): 1072–1080. doi:10.1021/nn303973r. ISSN 1936-0851. PMID 23273148. Wikidata Q59309532.
- Zhi Guo; Yan Wan; Mengjin Yang; Jordan Snaider; Kai Zhu; Libai Huang (1 April 2017). "Long-range hot-carrier transport in hybrid perovskites visualized by ultrafast microscopy". Science. 356 (6333): 59–62. doi:10.1126/science.aam7744. ISSN 0036-8075. PMID 28386007. Wikidata Q48042357.
- Long Yuan; Libai Huang (1 April 2015). "Exciton dynamics and annihilation in WS2 2D semiconductors". Nanoscale. 7 (16): 7402–7408. doi:10.1039/c5nr00383k. ISSN 2040-3364. PMID 25826397. Wikidata Q87025303.
