= Guankou Subdistrict, Dujiangyan =

Guankou Subdistrict 灌口街道
- Subdistrict
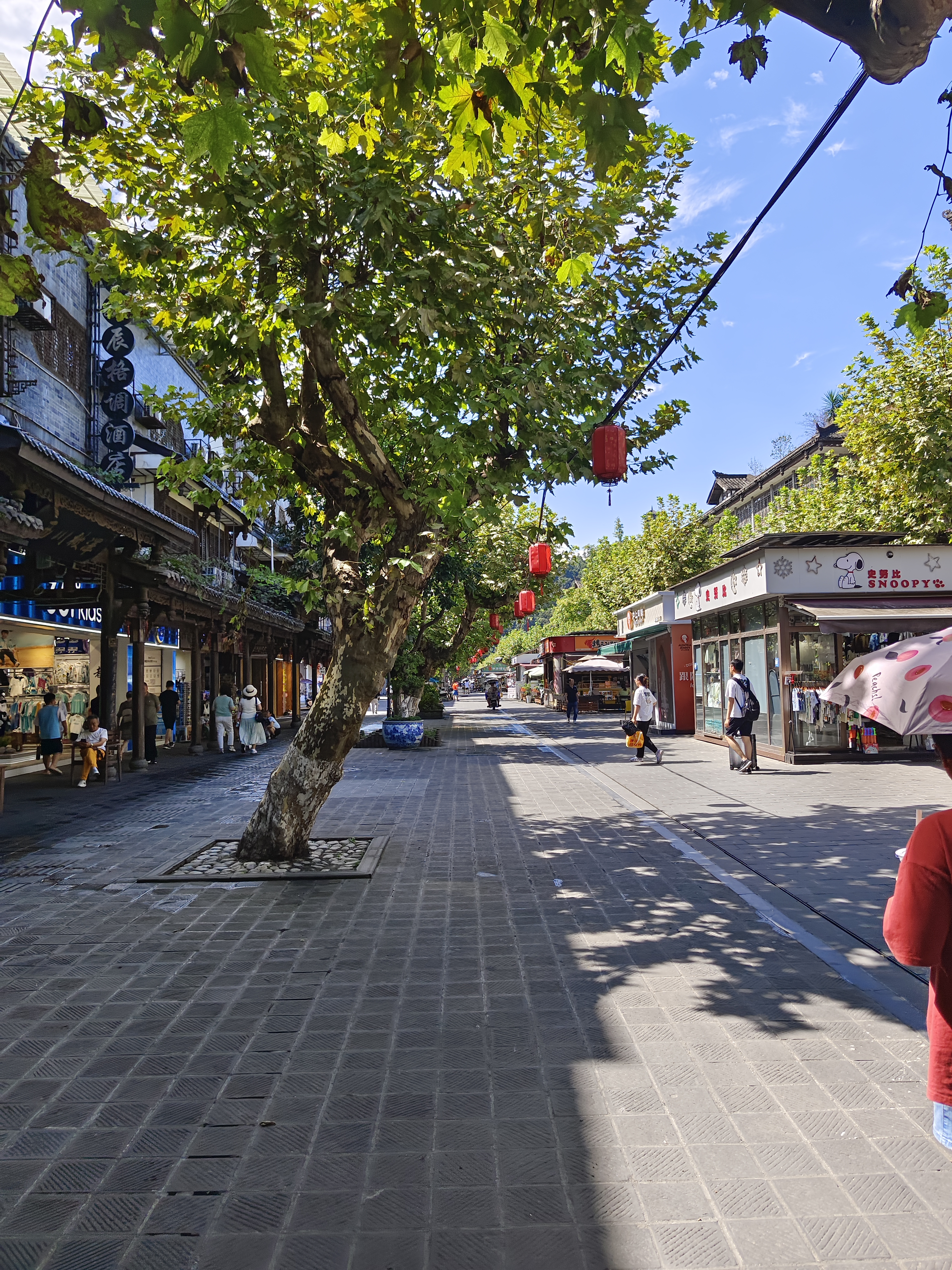

- Location in Sichuan
- Coordinates: 31°0′27″N 103°37′58″E
- Country: People's Republic of China
- Province: Sichuan
- Prefecture-level city: Chengdu
- County-level city: Dujiangyan City
- Time zone: UTC+8 (China Standard)

Guankou Subdistrict (Chinese: 灌口街道; pinyin: Guànkǒu Jiēdào) is a subdistrict in Dujiangyan City, Sichuan, China. As of 2020, it administers the following nine residential communities:

- Nanqiao Community (南桥社区)
- Liuhe Community (柳河社区)
- Pingyi Community (平义社区)
- Puyang Road Community (蒲阳路社区)
- Jianxing Community (建兴社区)
- Taiping Community (太平社区)
- Fulong Community (伏龙社区)
- Xichuan Community (西川社区)
- Lingyan Community (灵岩社区)

== See also ==
- List of township-level divisions of Sichuan
