= Wenjin Temple =

- 问津寺
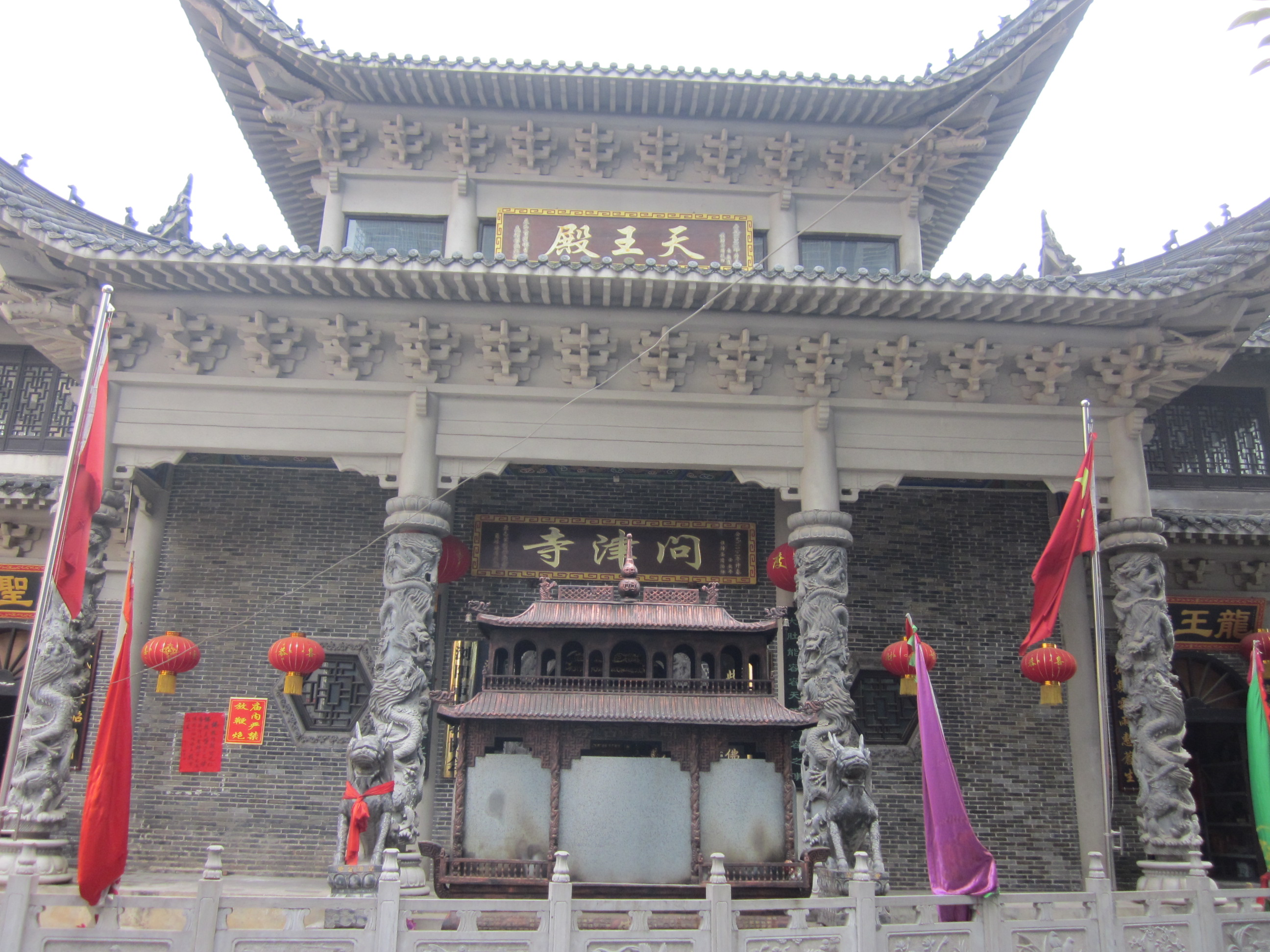
- The entrance.

- Location within Hunan Location within China

Religion
- Affiliation: Buddhism
- Deity: Chan Buddhism

Location
- Location: Liuyang, Hunan
- Country: China
- Interactive map of Wenjin Temple
- Coordinates: 28°08′37″N 113°38′08″E

Architecture
- Style: Chinese architecture
- Founder: Zongzhi
- Established: 827
- Completed: 1989 (reconstruction)

Wenjin Temple (simplified Chinese: 问津寺; traditional Chinese: 問津寺; pinyin: Wènjīn Sì) is a Buddhist temple located in Liuyang city, Hunan province, in the People's Republic of China. It includes the shanmen, Mahavira Hall, Four Heavenly Kings Hall, Hall of Saintly Emperor Guan, Meditation Room, Dining Room, etc. The temple has a building area of about 400 square metres (4,300 sq ft) and covers an area of 660 square metres (7,100 sq ft).

== History ==
In 827, in the second year of the age of Dahe of Emperor Wenzong, monk Zongzhi (宗智禅师) built this temple.

After the founding of Communist regime, the temple stopped religious activities.

In 1966, during the Cultural Revolution, the transport team lived here.

In 1987, as Chengxi School (城西小学) extended school buildings, the temple was removed.

In 1989, Liu Puquan (柳蒲全), the president of Liuyang Buddhism Association rebuilt the temple.

== Gallery ==
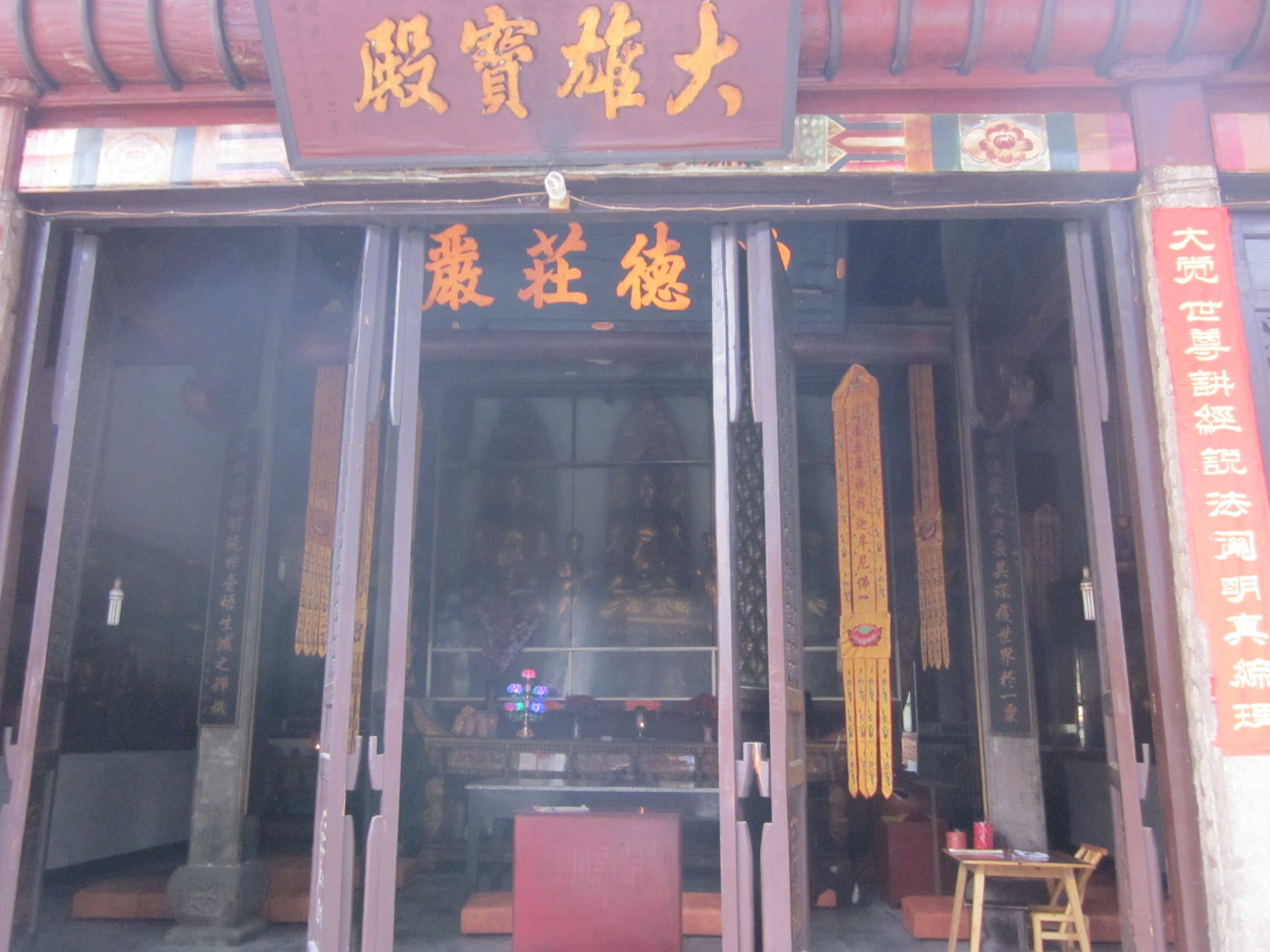
The Mahavira Hall.

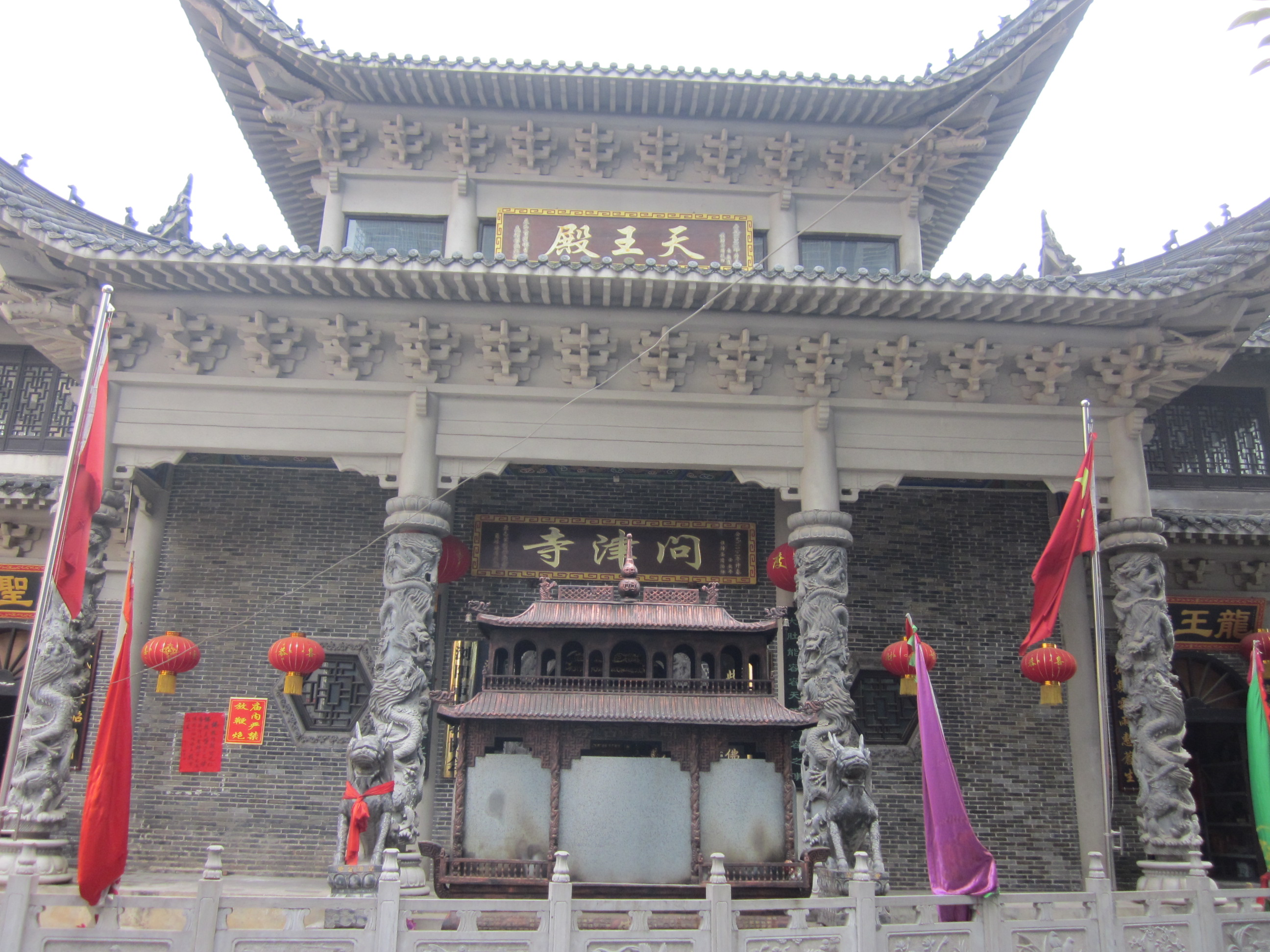
The Four Heavenly Kings Hall.

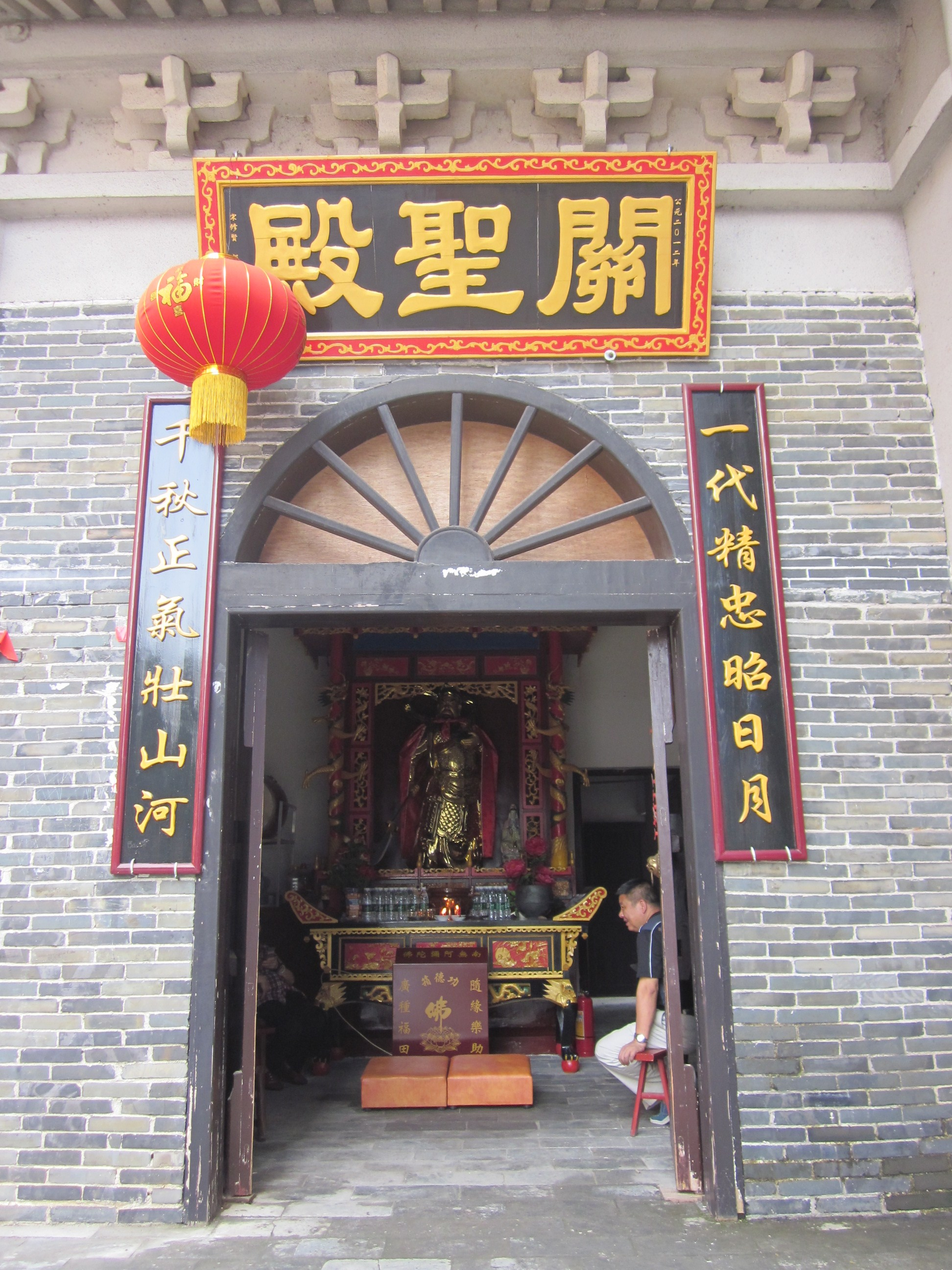
The Hall of Saintly Emperor Guan.

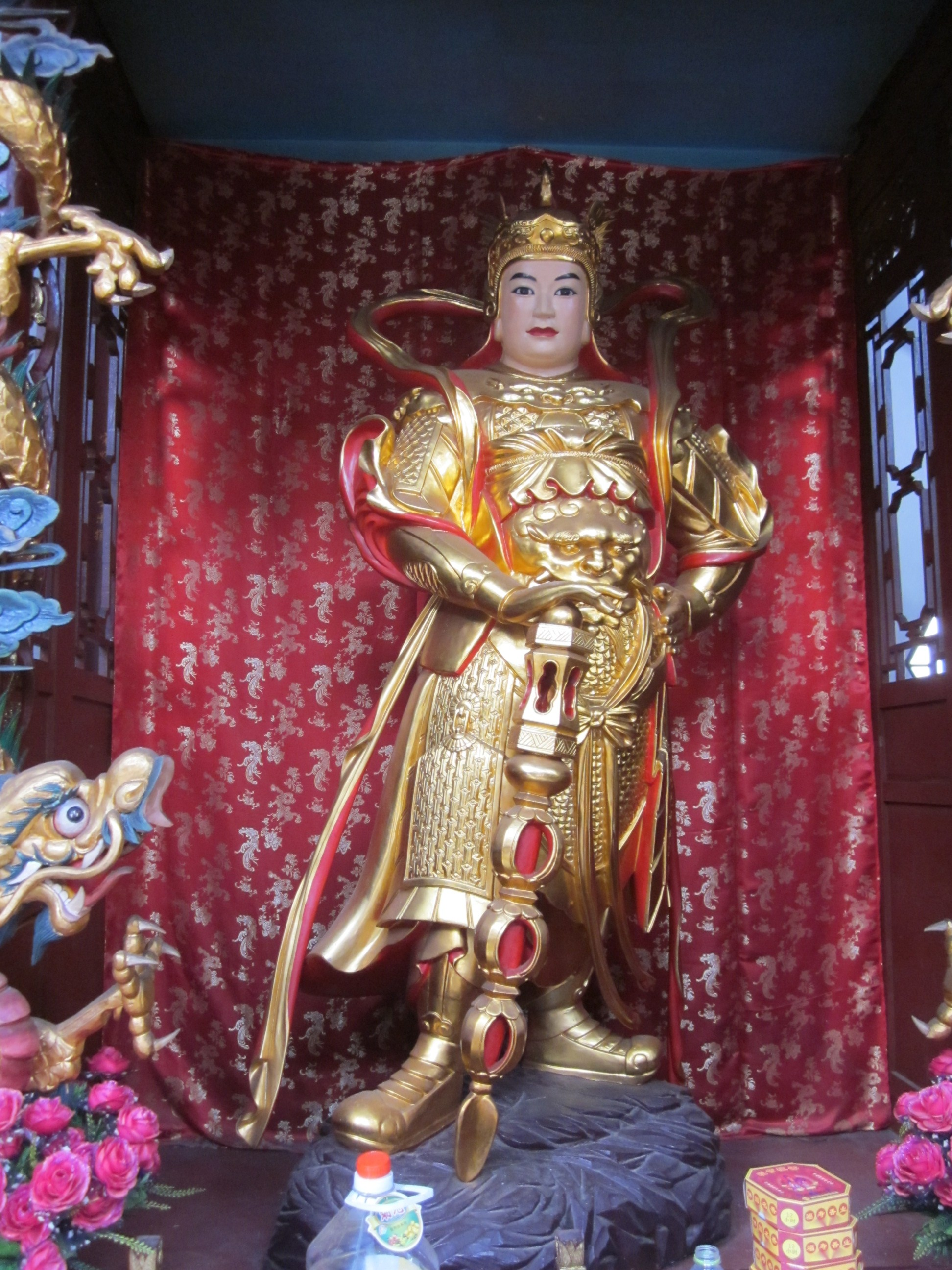
Statue of Skanda.

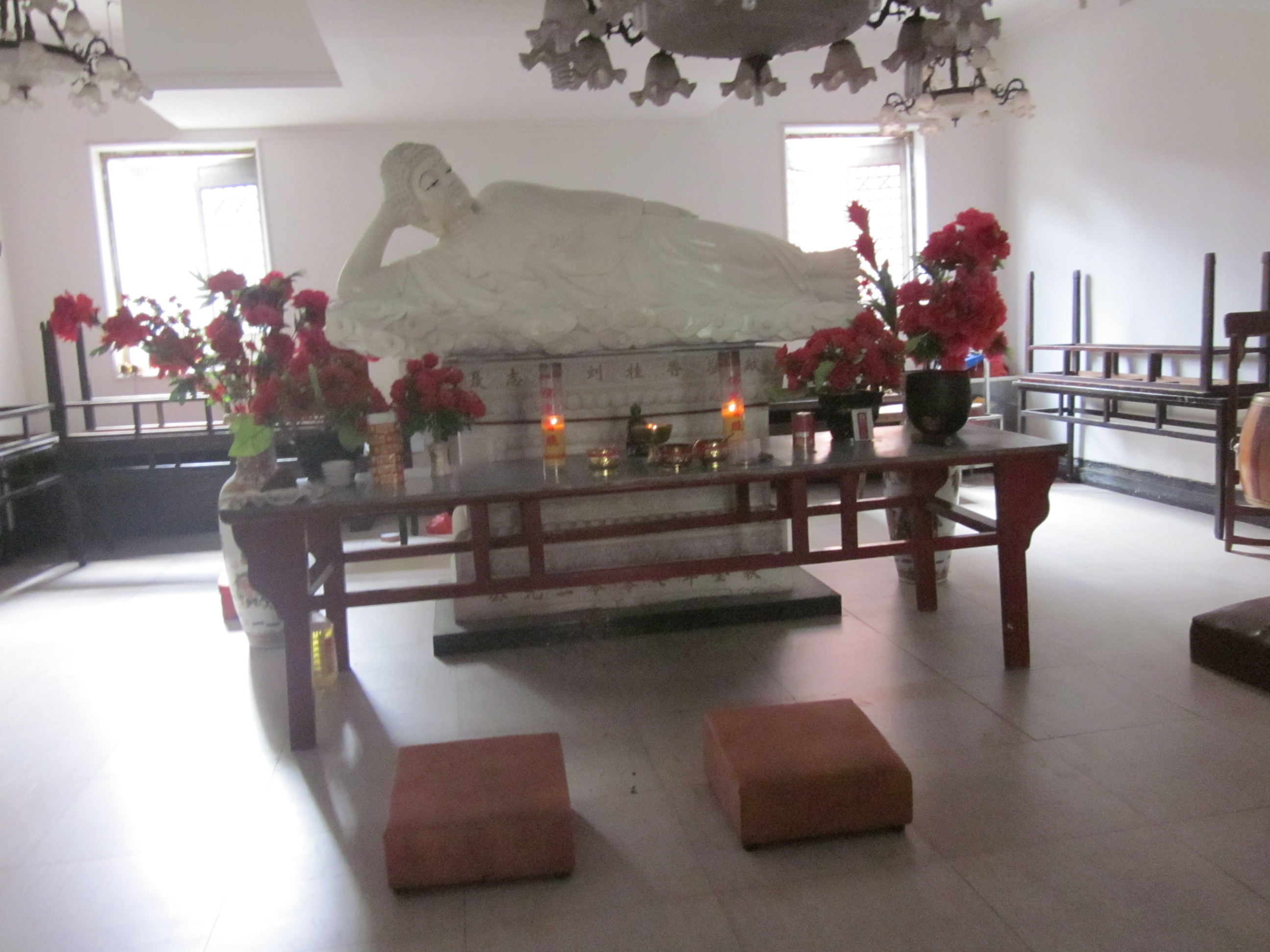
Statue of reclining Buddha.

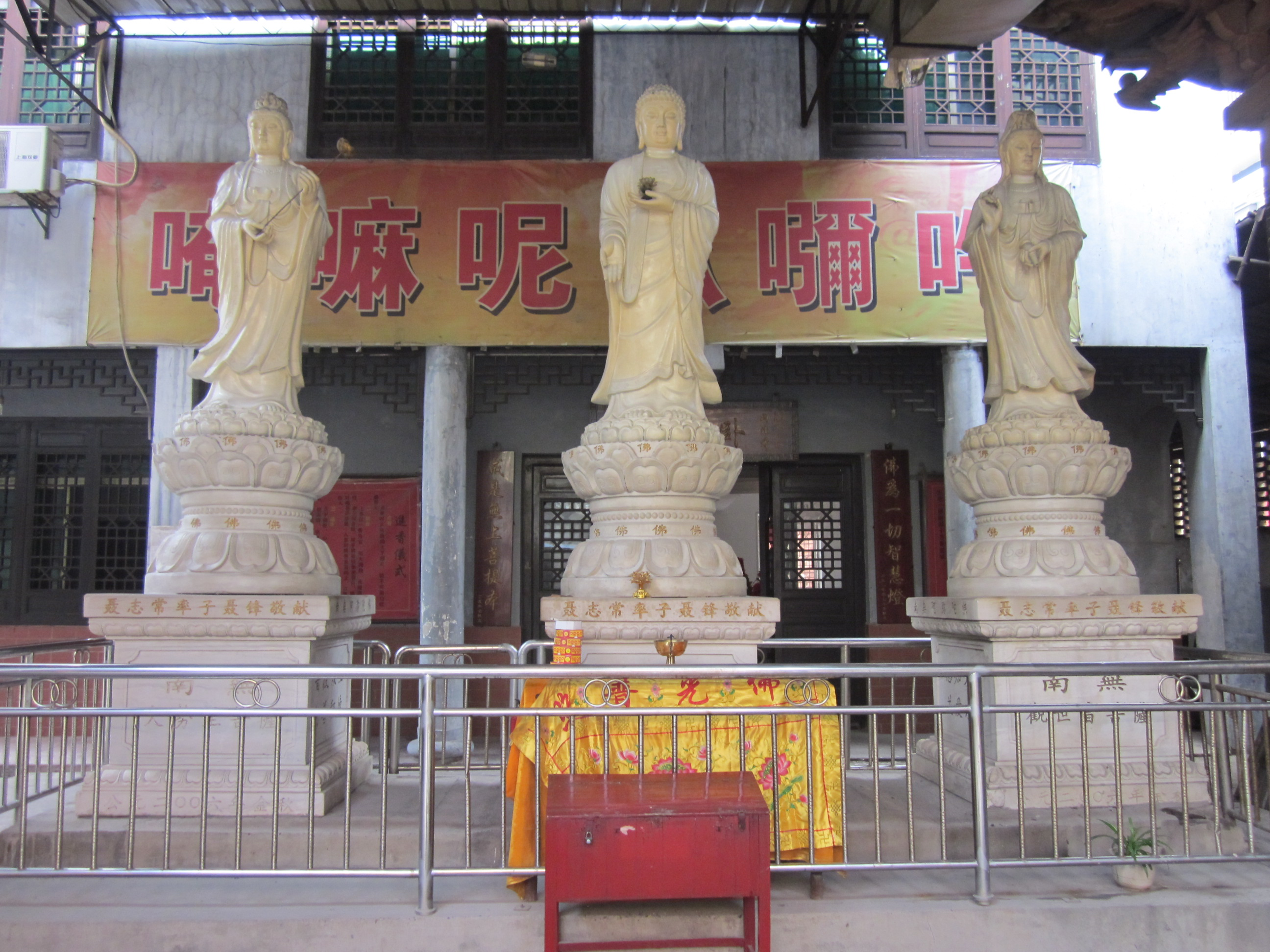
Statues of Three Sages.
