= Gaoping, Liuyang =

Gaoping Town 高坪镇
- Town
- Location in Hunan
- Coordinates: 28°12′00″N 113°47′44″E
- Country: People's Republic of China
- Province: Hunan
- Prefecture-level city: Changsha
- County-level city: Liuyang

Area
  - Total: 257.4 km^{2} (99.4 sq mi)

Population (2015)
  - Total: 38,600
  - Density: 150/km^{2} (388/sq mi)
- Time zone: UTC+8 (China Standard)
- Postal code: 410302
- Area code: 0731

Gaoping Town (simplified Chinese: 高坪镇; traditional Chinese: 高坪鎮; pinyin: Gāopíng Zhèn) is a suburban town in Liuyang City, Hunan Province, People's Republic of China. As of the 2015 census it had a population of 38,600 and an area of 257.4 square kilometres (99.4 sq mi). It borders the towns of Yonghe and Gugang in the north, Zhonghe Town in the east, Chengtanjiang Town in the south, and the subdistricts of Hehua and Guankou in the west.

== History ==
Gaoping was incorporated as a township in April 1950.

In October 2005, it was upgraded to a town.

== Administrative division ==
The town is divided into 11 villages and one community, which include the following areas:

- Gaoping Community (高坪社区)
- Yangtan Village (杨潭村)
- Chuancang Village (船仓村)
- Shiwan Village (石湾村)
- Xiangyang Village (向阳村)
- Zhimin Village (志民村)
- Yandian Village (沿甸村)
- Taiping Village (太坪村)
- Zhushuqiao Village (株树桥村)
- Ma'an Village (马鞍村)
- Shuangjiang Village (双江村)
- Sanheshui Village (三合水村)

== Geography ==
Daxi River (大溪河) and Xiaoxi River (小溪河) flow through the town. The town lies at the confluence of these two rivers.

Zhushuqiao Reservoir (株树桥水库) is the largest body of water and the largest reservoir in the town.

Mount Tianyanzhai (天岩寨) is a mountain in the town. The peak is 566.6 metres (1,859 ft).

== Economy ==
The local economy is primarily based upon agriculture and local industry, such as vegetables, fruits and fireworks.

== Education ==
- Gaoping Middle School

== Expressway ==
- County Road X005

== Attraction ==
Gufengdong Scenic Spot (古风洞风景区) is a well-known tourist attraction.

== Notable people ==
- Li Zhimin (1906–1987), a general in the People's Liberation Army.
