= Guankou Subdistrict, Liuyang =

Guankou Subdistrict 关口街道
- Subdistrict
- Location in Hunan
- Coordinates: 28°09′51″N 113°38′57″E
- Country: People's Republic of China
- Province: Hunan
- Prefecture-level city: Changsha
- County-level city: Liuyang

Area
  - Total: 161.8 km^{2} (62.5 sq mi)

Population (2015)
  - Total: 50,400
  - Density: 311/km^{2} (807/sq mi)
- Time zone: UTC+8 (China Standard)
- Postal code: 410300
- Area code: 0731

Guankou Subdistrict (simplified Chinese: 关口街道; traditional Chinese: 關口街道; pinyin: Guānkǒu Jiēdào) is an urban subdistrict and the seat of Liuyang City, Hunan Province, China. As of the 2015 census it had a population of 50,400 and an area of 161.8 square kilometres (62.5 sq mi). Xijiang Township merged to Guankou subdistrict on November 18, 2015. The town is bordered to the northeast by Gugang Town, to the southeast by Gaoping Town, to the south by Hehua Subdistrict, to the west by Jiaoxi Township, to the northwest by Chunkou Town, and to the southwest by Jili Subdistrict.

== History ==
In 2015, Xijiang Township merged to Guankou subdistrict.

== Administrative divisions ==
The subdistrict is divided into nine villages and three communities, which include the following areas:

- Shuijia Community (水佳社区)
- Zhanjia Community (占佳社区)
- Changxing Community (长兴社区)
- Jinkou Village (金口村)
- Yangxihu Village (杨溪湖村)
- Shengping Village (升平村)
- Jinqiao Village (金桥村)
- JinhuVillage (金湖村)
- Hetian Village (和田村)
- Tanpeng Village (碳棚村)
- Xijiang Village (溪江村)
- Daoyuanhu Village (道源湖村)

== Geography ==
The subdistrict has two reservoirs: Quantang Reservoir (泉塘水库) and Daoyuan Reservoir (道源水库).

Liuyang River, also known as the mother river, flows through the subdistrict.

== Economy ==
The economy is supported primarily by commerce and aquatic products industry.

== Education ==
- Tianjibing Experimental Middle School (田家炳实验中学)

== Transportation ==
The East Bus station is situated at the subdistrict.

=== Expressway ===
The Changsha–Liuyang Expressway, from Changsha, running west to east through the subdistrict to Jiangxi.

=== Provincial Highway ===
The Provincial Highway S309 runs south–north through the subdistrict.

=== Railway ===
The Liling–Liuyang railway, passes across the subdistrict north to south.

== Attractions ==
Two public parks are located in the subdistrict: Changtang Park (长塘公园) and Sports Park (体育公园).
