= Li Bai (spy) =

Chinese spy (1910–1949)

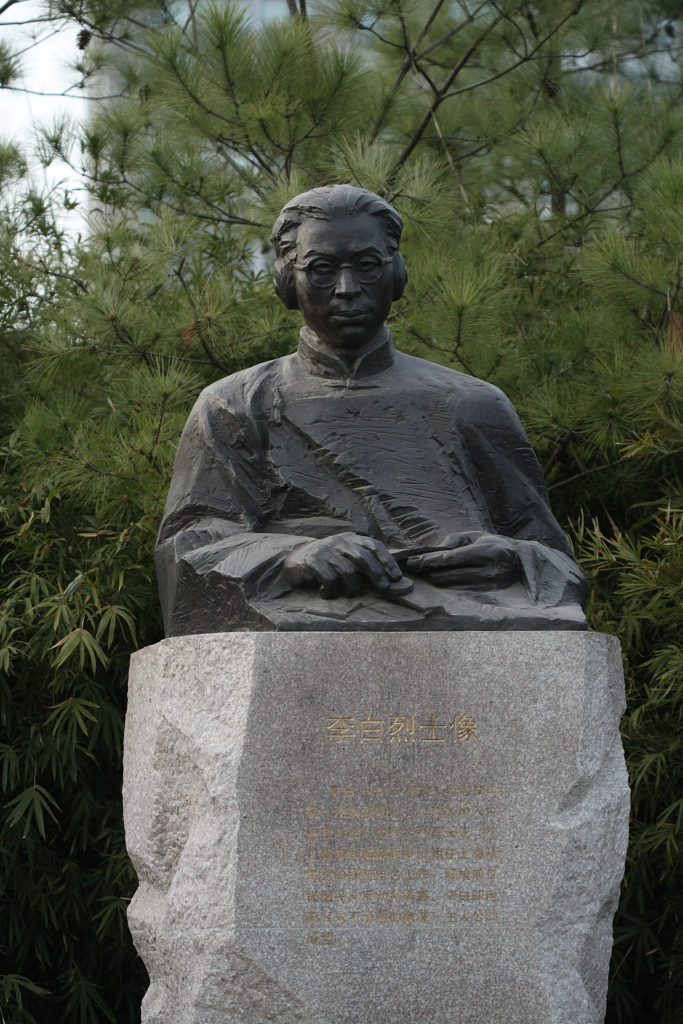
A sculpture of Li Bai, located at Century Park, Pudong, Shanghai

Li Bai (Chinese: 李白; 1910–1949), alternate names Li Huachu, Li Pu, Li Xia and Li Jingan, was a famous spy of the Chinese Communist Party, born in Liuyang, Hunan.

== Biography ==
Li Bai was born in a peasant's family. In 1925, he joined the China Communist Party, and in 1930, he joined the Chinese Red Army Red 4th Regiment. Soon, he studied wireless technology at Red Army Telecommunication School at Ruijin, Jiangxi. After graduation, he was assigned to the Red 5th Regiment as the chief and political commissar of radio station. In 1934, he followed the main force of the Red Army for Long March.

After the outbreak of the Second Sino-Japanese War in October 1937, Li Bai was sent to coordinate and establish a secret radio station in Shanghai. In 1942, his radio station was discovered by the Japanese Army; Li Bai and his wife were arrested. After he was rescued by the CCP, the Japanese Army thought it was only his private radio station, so he and his wife were released in May 1943.

His technology skills were recognised by the Kuomintang, and he was hired as a wireless operator at the Institute of International Issues of the Republic of China (中华民国国际问题研究所) in Chun'an, Zhejiang. After World War II, the institute moved back to Shanghai, and he became an important CCP spy inside the Kuomintang.

During the Chinese Civil War, Li Bai sent a large amount of secret information to the communists. On December 29, 1948, he got top secret intelligence about the KMT's entire defence line along the Yangtze River. At dawn the next day, while he was sending this intelligence by telegraph, the radio was detected and he was arrested by the KMT. On May 7, 1949, Chiang Kai-shek signed a writ of execution. He was executed in Pudong. Thanks to these telegraphs, the CCP took less than two months to bring soldiers across the Yangtze, and then occupy Nanjing (capital of the Republic of China), Hangzhou, and Shanghai.

Li Bai's life was made into the film The Eternal Wave, in which he is named Li Xia and portrayed by the famous actor Sun Daolin. Some of his remains were deposited in the National Museum of China. The site of his death, now in Century Park, has a bust statue. Beijing University of Posts and Telecommunications also has his sculpture on campus.
