= Huang Xing =

Chinese revolutionary (1874-1916)

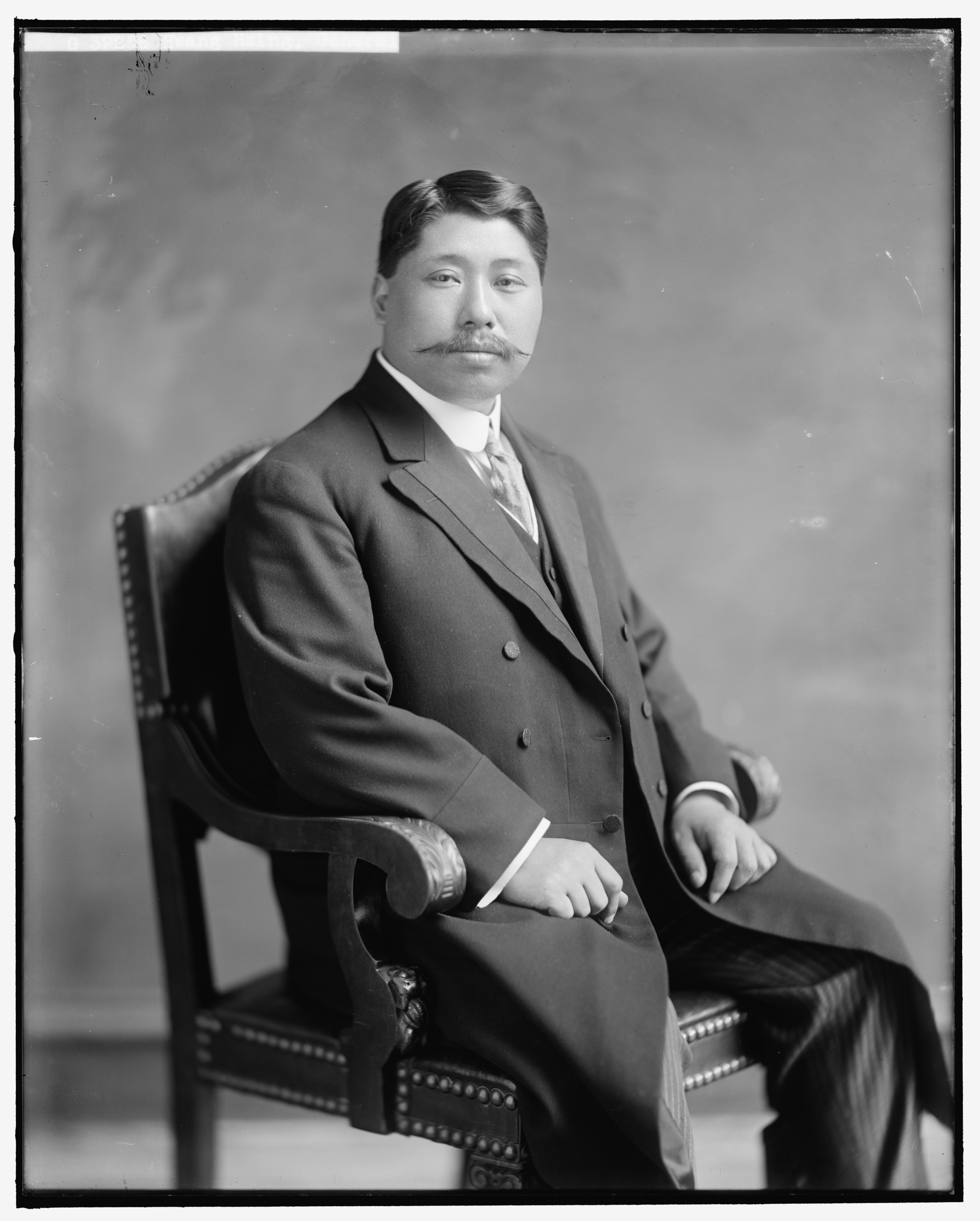
- Huang between 1905 and 1916
- Born: 24 October 1874; Huangxing, Changsha, Qing Empire
- Died: 31 October 1916 (aged 42); Shanghai, Republic of China
- Education: Jinshi degree in the Imperial Examination
- Relatives: Liao Danru (wife)
- Military career
- Allegiance: Tongmenghui, Kuomintang
- Branch: Tongmenghui
- Service years: 1894–1912
- Rank: General
- Nickname: Eight Fingered General
- Conflicts: Xinhai Revolution

Chinese name
- Traditional Chinese: 黃興
- Simplified Chinese: 黄兴
Transcriptions
Standard Mandarin
- Hanyu Pinyin: Huáng Xīng
- Wade–Giles: Huang^{2} Hsing^{1}
- IPA: [xwǎŋ ɕíŋ]

Huang Xing or Huang Hsing (Chinese: 黃興; 25 October 1874 – 31 October 1916) was a Chinese revolutionary leader and politician, and the first commander-in-chief of the Republic of China. As one of the founders of the Kuomintang (KMT) and the Republic of China, his position was second only to Sun Yat-sen. Together they were known as Sun-Huang during the Xinhai Revolution. He was also known as the "Eight Fingered General" because of wounds sustained during war. His tomb is on Mount Yuelu, in Changsha, Hunan, China.

Huang was born in the village of Gaotang, now part of Changsha, Hunan. Like many other Chinese men born before 1949, Huang was known by many different names during his life. His birth name was "Huang Zhen", but this was later changed to "Huang Xing". He was also known as "Huang Keqiang" and "Qing Wu". In the period after 1911 he also used the names "Li Youqing" and "Zhang Shouzheng".

== Biography ==
=== Early life ===
Huang Xing was a descendant of Huang Tingjian, a Chinese artist, scholar, government official, and poet of the Song dynasty. Huang Xing began his studies at the prestigious South Changsha Academy in 1893, and received his Jinshi degree when he was only 22 years old. In 1898, Huang Xing was selected to complete further study at Wuchang Lianghu College, from which Huang Xing graduated in 1901. In 1902, Huang was selected by Zhang Zhidong to study abroad in Japan, and was enrolled in Tokyo's Kōbun Institute (弘文学院).

While in Japan, Huang Xing developed an appreciation for the study of military affairs, and studied modern warfare under a Japanese officer in his leisure time. While living in Japan, Huang Xing practiced horsemanship and shooting every morning. Huang Xing's military training in Japan prepared him for his later role as a Chinese revolutionary.

=== Taking up the sword ===
In 1903, Huang organized the Anti-Russia Volunteer Army (Chinese: 拒俄義勇隊; pinyin: Jù-É Yìyǒngduì) of over two hundred fellow students in Japan. The Army, quickly shut down by authorities in Japan, was intended to protest Russia's growing hegemony over Outer Mongolia and its occupation of northeast China after the Boxer Uprising. Later in 1903, Huang returned to China and organized a meeting with Chen Tianhua, Song Jiaoren, and more than 20 other people. The group founded the Huaxinghui, a secret revolutionary party dedicated to the overthrow of the Qing Dynasty. Huang Xing was elected president.

The Huaxinghui cooperated with other revolutionary parties, and in 1905 scheduled an armed uprising in Changsha during the Empress Dowager's seventieth birthday celebration. The Huaxinghui's plan was discovered, and its members (including Huang) were forced to escape to Japan. In Japan, Huang met Sun Yat-sen and helped Sun found the Tongmenghui, another revolutionary party dedicated to the overthrow of the Qing Dynasty. Huang held the post of General Affairs Officer, and became the Tongmenghui's second most important leader, after Sun. Following the founding of the Tongmenghui, Huang devoted his time and energy to the revolution.

=== Attempted uprisings ===
In 1907, Huang secretly returned to China and traveled to Hanoi in French Indochina in order to participate in numerous revolts, including the Qinzhou Uprising, Fangcheng Uprising, and Zhen Nanguan Uprising. All of the revolts that Huang actively took part in failed due to lack of sufficient resources. In the autumn of 1909, Huang was commissioned by Sun Yat-sen to establish the South Branch of the Tongmenghui, and to prepare the Party for a planned military uprising from Guangzhou. In the spring of 1909, Huang led another uprising, but this revolt also failed. In October 1909, Huang presided over an assembly with Sun Yat-sen in the British colony of Penang (now part of Malaysia). The assembly decided to concentrate human and financial resources to stage further uprisings in Guangzhou.

In the spring of 1911, Huang established the Department of the Guangzhou Uprising in Hong Kong, and became the Department's minister. On April 27, Huang launched the Huanghuagang Uprising in Guangzhou, and led hundreds of people in an attempt to capture the viceroy of Guangdong and Guangxi. Huang and his followers failed to capture the viceroy, who climbed over a wall in order to escape them. During the skirmish, Huang sustained serious injuries and sustained a gunshot wound to his hand, losing two of his fingers. The Huanghuagang Uprising turned out to be the last unsuccessful revolt before the Wuchang Uprising, that ultimately succeeded in overthrowing the Qing Dynasty by the end of 1911.

Following the Wuchang Uprising in October 1911, Huang Xing traveled from Shanghai to Wuchang and commanded the revolutionary forces in the Battle of Yangxia against Qing loyalist forces of Yuan Shikai.

=== Opposing Yuan Shikai ===
On January 1, 1912, the Nanjing Interim Government was established, and Huang was selected to be one of its leaders. In August 1912, Huang became the director of the KMT. In March 1913, the provisional president of the newly formed Republic of China, Yuan Shikai, successfully assassinated the chairman of the KMT, Song Jiaoren, whose party had won China's first elections and who had shown indications of a desire to limit Yuan's powers within the new government.

In later 1913, Yuan Shikai expelled KMT members from all government offices and moved the government to Beijing. Huang stayed in Nanjing and attempted to reorganize the South Army in order to oppose Yuan. Because of a shortage of money, Huang's army later mutinied, and Huang had to abandon Nanjing and retreat to the foreign concession areas of Shanghai. Sun Yat-sen again fled to Japan in November 1913.

In July 1913, Sun organized armed forces to suppress Yuan, and the Second Revolution broke out. On July 14, Huang went to Nanjing from Shanghai, convinced the military governor of Jiangsu to declare independence from Yuan, and pushed to be the military commander in charge suppressing Yuan's forces in Jiangsu. After Huang's rebellion in Jiangsu failed, Huang fled back to Japan.

=== Final years ===
Huang went into exile in the United States in 1914, and Yuan Shikai proclaimed himself emperor in 1915. While abroad, Huang raised funds in order to raise a Yunnan National Protection Army to suppress Yuan. After the death of Yuan, in June 1916, Huang returned to China. In October 1916, Huang died in Shanghai at the age of 42 of cirrhosis. On April 15, 1917, Huang was given a state funeral, and was buried in Changsha on Yuelu Mountain.

== Family ==
Children:

- Huang Yiou (黄一欧), youngest ever member of the Tongmenghui and a prominent leader in the Republic of China
- Huang Yizhong (黄一中), was a Counselor of the Ministry of Railways, Ministry of the Interior in the Republic of China
- Huang Zhenhua (黄振华), was a female member of the Legislative Yuan of the Republic of China
- Huang Yihuan (黄一寰), known as the "Father of China's Blind" for his contribution towards blind people
- Huang Teh-hua (黄德华, Cordelia Hsueh), Huang's youngest child resided on the East Coast of the United States of America until her death in 2002.

== Remembrance ==
- In Changsha, Nanzheng Street was renamed to Huang Xing Road in 1934. There are also roads named in honor of Huang Xing in Shanghai and Wuhan.
- The town where Huang Xing was born was renamed "Huang Xing Town" in his honor.
- Similar to the Zhongshan Parks, the Huang Xing Park in Shanghai is named after Huang Xing.
- In 1932, his portrait was used on the 20c brown-lake stamp of the Chinese Republic series commemorating Martyrs of the Revolution.
- His birthplace and former residence in Changsha, Hunan, is now a museum in his honor.

=== In popular culture ===
Huang Xing is portrayed by Jackie Chan in the film 1911, released in 2011 on the 100th anniversary of the Wuchang Uprising.
