= The Revolutionary Army =

1903 pamphlet by Zou Rong

- Author: Zou Rong
- Original title: 革命军
- Language: Chinese
- Genre: Essay
- Publisher: Su Bao
- Publication date: 1903
- Publication place: Chinese Empire
- OCLC: 706898916

The Revolutionary Army (simplified Chinese: 革命军; traditional Chinese: 革命軍) is a revolutionary pamphlet that was written by Zou Rong and published in Shanghai in 1903 with a preface by Zhang Binglin. As an 18-year-old, Zou wrote the text while studying in Japan. He was influenced by early Chinese revolutionaries, as well as by Enlightenment and post-Enlightenment sources like Jean-Jacques Rousseau, Montesquieu, the United States Declaration of Independence and John Stuart Mill.

In the volume, Zou harshly criticizes Manchu rule during the late Qing dynasty in strongly emotional tones and promotes an early form of Han Chinese nationalism. The pamphlet is notable for using racialist language to describe the Manchus. Zou calls for Han Chinese to throw off being slaves and overthrow China's Manchu rulers. Drawing on Western sources, Zou also calls for the revolution to result in a democratic republic. He appeals to the natural rights of man and promotes a society based on social and gender equality with universal suffrage and political and civil rights.

Zou's book was published in 1903 and became one of the bestselling revolutionary texts, receiving more than 20 printings and selling as many as a million copies despite attempted suppression by the Qing government. For his work in writing the volume, Zou was jailed and died in jail in 1905, turning him into a revolutionary martyr. The Revolutionary Army was a significant influence on Sun Yat-sen, who distributed the pamphlet internationally, and the 1911 revolution, as well as on later episodes during the Communist rise to power in China.

== Background ==
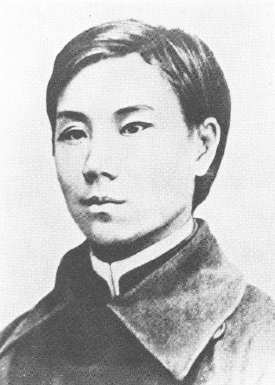
Portrait of Zou Rong

Zou was born in 1885 in Sichuan into an affluent family. He studied in Chengdu and Chongqing but rejected his Confucian education, resulting in his expulsion from school. During his time in Chongqing, he learned English and Japanese. Zou went to Japan for studies beginning in 1901. During his time in Japan, Zou studied western philosophy and revolutionary history—including Thomas Carlyle, John Stuart Mill and Herbert Spencer—and he became acquainted with Chinese revolutionaries like Feng Ziyou, an associate of Sun Yat-sen. It was during this time in Japan, from 1901 to 1903, that Zou wrote The Revolutionary Army.

== Publication history ==
Zou returned to China in March 1903 having completed his pamphlet. He met revolutionary and philologist Zhang Binglin upon his returned and showed him the manuscript. Zhang was impressed; he authored a preface for it and arranged to have it printed. The Revolutionary Army was published in Shanghai by Su Bao in May 1903 and reprinted that year in Hong Kong, Singapore and Yokohama. It was part of an anthology series called the Revolutionary Vanguard (Ko-ming hsien-feng) published by a Sun-affiliated newspaper. In addition to Zou's essay, the volume included a preface by Zhang, two revolutionary songs and a diary of the Yangzhou massacre. The book was published illegally, so estimates of its printing are hard to validate. One historian of the revolution said a million copies were printed, but the 1968 translator of the work describes this estimate as a "rhetorical gesture." The Revolutionary Army was distributed through several secret societies and study circles throughout China. It has been estimated that the volume received more than 20 printings.

== Synopsis ==
Zou begins with an introductory chapter that defines revolution and Chinese despotism and identifies the revolutionary writings of westerners that inspired his work, including Rousseau's The Social Contract, Montesquieu's The Spirit of Law, Mill's On Liberty and the United States Declaration of Independence (58–64 (Note: Page numbers cited in this section are from John Lust's 1968 translation.)). Chapter 2 (65–98) provides a narrative of grievances against the Qing regime that Zou believes rise to revolution, while the third chapter (99–105) articulates the need for the people to receive revolutionary education.

In the fourth chapter (106–112), Zou provides a racial taxonomy. He distinguishes between the "Chinese races" (Han, Tibetan and a "Cochinese" race originating in southwestern China) and the "Siberian races", which include Mongolian, Tungusic (including Manchu) and Turkic peoples (106–107) He criticizes Han Chinese for their servitude under Manchu rule:

Han men! Han men! You are moreover recommended by the Manchus as slaves for European and American countries. I had rather see the Han race extinct, killed to a man, dead to a man, rather than that they should live and prosper, sing the praises of rivers and hills, and wander about for pleasure while under the heel of the Manchus. (108)

Chapter 5 (113–121) builds on Zou's concept of the Han as slaves and insists that a successful revolution must first remove the "slavishness" of the Chinese people. "I say that those who live peaceably under a despotic government, whatever their aims, are bound to be slaves," Zou says (114). For the revolution to succeed, he writes, "I would wish my fellowcountrymen to act with one mind, to put every effort into grinding and polishing, to uproot their servility and advance to become citizens in China" (116).

The sixth chapter (122–125) includes Zou's outline of principles for independence, which he says he based on "the principles of American revolutionary independence" (123). These principles begin with the overthrow the Manchu government and expulsion or killing of all Manchus in China, including the killing of the emperor as a warning to others. Once the overthrow is complete, a central government would be installed with a representative general assembly composed of elected deputies. Zou's principles include universal citizenship for Han Chinese, a duty of taxation for all, mandatory service in the armed forces for men, and equality of the sexes and among social classes. Citizens have "inalienable rights are bestowed by nature", and his principles recognize "the freedom to live" along with freedom of speech, thought and the press. Echoing the U.S. Declaration of Independence, Zou writes:

The government which must be set up by public agreement, must employ all the powers granted it purely to defend popular rights. If, at any time, the actions of a government lead to an infraction of people's rights, they have the right to carry out a revolution, and overthrow the old government to retrieve their peace and contentment. Once these have been obtained, the question of rights must be publicly discussed and a new government set up. This also is to be a right of the people. (123–124)

The new Republic of China would be free and independent among the nations of the world, and its law would be modeled on U.S. constitutional law. (124) Zou concludes with a brief exhortation (126–127).

== Reception ==
The Revolutionary Army became the most widely read revolutionary tract of its time. After publication, Zhang and Zou were arrested on sedition charges, although these were unsuccessful and the two men were instead convicted of lèse-majesté. In May 1904, Zhang was sentenced to three years in prison and Zou to two. However, Zou became ill in prison and died there in April 1905. His trial and subsequent death while incarcerated turned him into a revolutionary martyr. While Zou was not the only writer making similar arguments, his book was among the best publicized. The clarity of Zou's prose played a role in popularizing Zhang's less penetrable writings.

The tract was widely reprinted after Zou's trial and death. Its success led Sun Yat-sen to begin articulating his revolutionary principles in written accounts. In a December 1903 letter to supporters, influenced by Zou's book, he began to replace the term "revolutionary party" with "revolutionary army". Sun, who admired Zou, shared The Revolutionary Army among Chinese communities abroad. Zou's essay was often cited in the student press over the decade that followed. It remained one of the most widely read texts among Sun's followers. But as the Chinese revolution unfolded, while Sun shared Zou's outlook on Han ascendancy, he moved away from Zou and Zhang's eliminationist rhetoric about non-Han (and about Manchus in particular). As the Qing empire failed, Sun clarified his views to portray minority groups like Manchus, Tibetans, Uighurs and others as backward but still a legitimate part of the polity, perhaps in part to make their populations more accepting of Chinese sovereignty.

Another element of The Revolutionary Army's influence is as one of the earliest texts to use the term Zhonghua Gongheguo ("Republic of China"). In Chinese history, The Revolutionary Army not only influenced the 1911 revolution; it also influenced the 1905 Chinese boycott and early Communist events like the May Fourth Movement as well as the Chinese Communist Revolution and the Cultural Revolution. By the mid-20th century, however, Zou came to be presented as a proto-revolutionary who failed to critique imperialism. He was viewed as typical of the pre-1911 revolutionaries in his "narrow racialist view." (A 1958 version of the text published in Shanghai asks readers to forgive Zou's anti-Manchu rhetoric.)

== Analysis ==
Zou's tract was a contrast from previous revolutionary literature, which was more esoteric and based on classical Chinese argumentation. The Revolutionary Army was intended for a wide readership and made emotional appeals. Emotional appeals were targeted against the Manchus using racially charged language (for example, describing Manchus as "furry and horned"). The emotional appeal of The Revolutionary Army is also based on the "ancestral connection" Zou conjures between himself and his audience and historical Han victims of Manchu oppression. According to Peter Zarrow, "For Zou, the transferential relationship is completed by the appeal to filial piety, which demands immediate revenge no matter how distant the crime." Revenge was a major theme of Zou's writing. Alongside Zhang Binglin and Chen Tianhua, Zou was one of the most outspoken exponents of anti-Manchuism in the years after the Boxer Rebellion.

Frank Dikötter has argued that the boundaries between Han and Manchu are more porous than Zou's rhetoric allows and that "the 'Han' is an artificial construct largely deployed for political purposes: Zou Rong wishes to overthrow the ruling Manchus." In this spirit, while Zou rooted his call for revolution in an ascendant and xenophobic Han nationalism, at the same time he argued from an appeal to civil rights. He was influenced by novelist Liang Qichao, from whom he adapted his concept of revolution, in developing the concept of guomin, or citizen. Liang promoted a concept of citizenship that would identify individuals with the state and draw from Anglo-Saxon and Japanese concepts to posit a citizen as the opposite of a slave. Zou developed the concept further, calling for citizens to embrace a "Chinese China", to embrace the dignity of freedom and equality, and to carry a spirit of individualism, fearlessness and autonomy. This concept would undermine traditional Chinese understandings of nationhood and civic identity and lay the groundwork for China to become a modern state. In this spirit, mid-20th-century historian Chen Xu-Lu argued that "antidespotism and antifeudalism" were major contributors to Zou's anti-Manchu racial rhetoric. Zarrow argues that Zou's work goes beyond Han nationalism to be "thoroughly imbued with the rhetoric of rights," in particular natural rights. "Zou Rong may be taken as representative of a way of thinking about human rights that made them integral to revolutionary righteousness."

Zou distinguished between "barbaric" revolutions (the "changes of dynastic rule") and the "civilized" revolution that would be represented by overthrowing the Manchu regime. According to Daniel Leese, "While barbaric revolutions solely engaged in destruction and resulted in anarchy and suffering, civilized revolutions engaged both in destruction and construction, achieving freedom, equality, and independence, thus increasing the happiness of the citizens."

In addition to Western sources attributed in the text and Liang, Zou's sources included politician Tan Sitong and poet Ou Jujia. According to Frank Li, the influence of the U.S. Declaration of Independence on Zou probably exceeded that of Rousseau, Montesquieu, Mill or any other western sources he named. Zou encountered the U.S. Declaration of Independence while studying in Japan and "as a result, he acquired an understanding of the reciprocal relationship between the government and the governed and the rights of men." Li said The Revolutionary Army includes "undeniable marks" of the Declaration's influence on Zou, including his call "to reclaim our rights bestowed by Heaven, to regain our freedom which we possessed since birth, and to acquire the happiness of all men are equal." Zou also echoed the Declaration with the statement "the unseizable rights of the individual are bestowed by Heaven" and by arguing that:

At whatever time when the behavior of the government infringes on the rights of the people, the people may make revolution and overthrow the old government, and satisfy their desire for safety and happiness. When their safety and happiness are secured, reorganize power after public discussion and establish a new government. (Note: Li's translation.)

Zou also listed several demands that mirrored the language of the 1901 translation of the Declaration in Chinese and that would result in a democratic republican form of government.
