= Former residence of Xu Guangda =

Former Residence of Xu Guangda
- 许光达故居
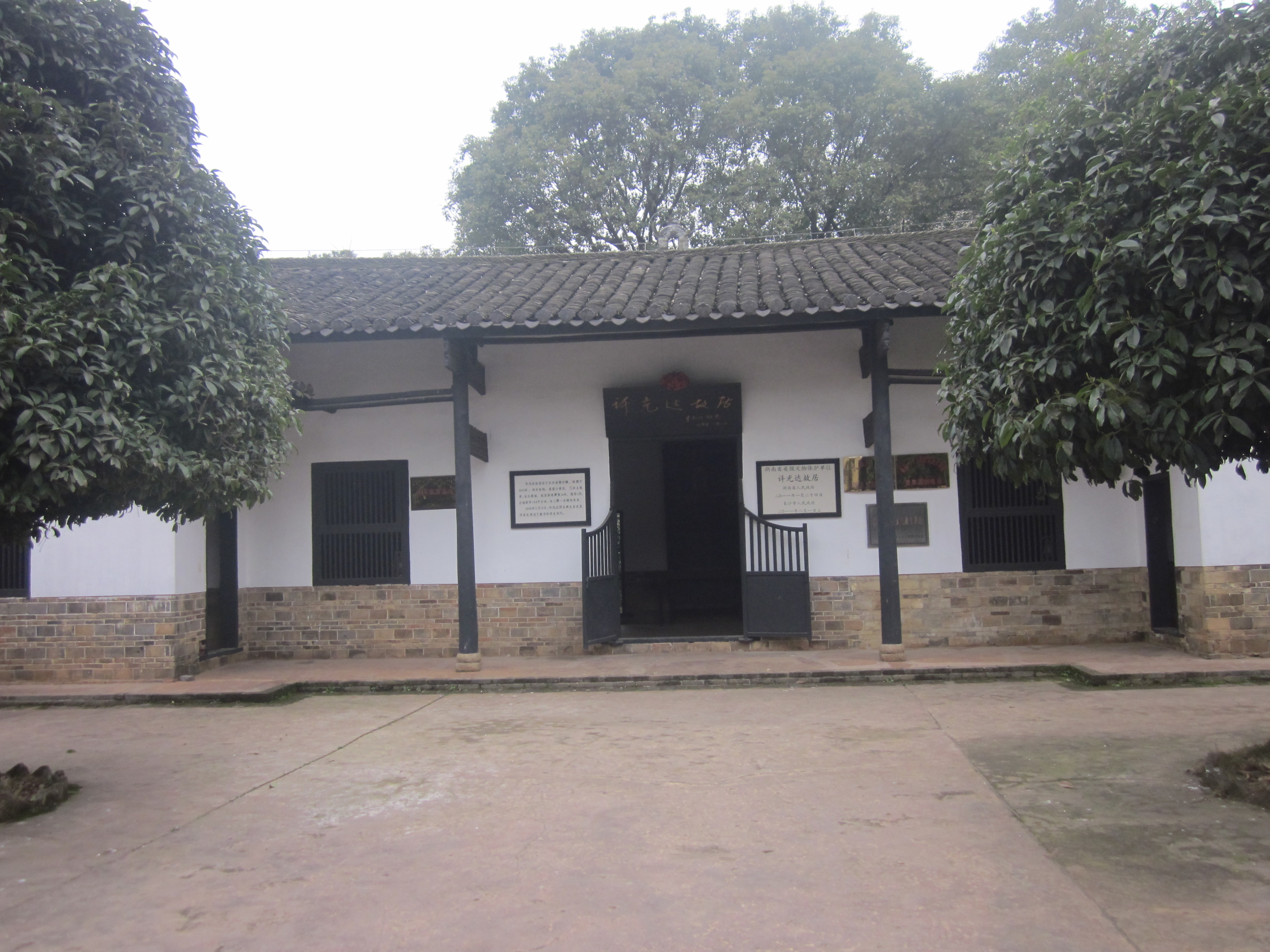
- Former Residence of Xu Guangda

- Location within Hunan Location within China

General information
- Type: Traditional folk houses
- Location: Huangxing Town, Changsha County, Hunan, China
- Coordinates: 28°08′30″N 113°05′49″E
- Completed: 1908
- Opened: 2005
- Renovated: 2005

Technical details
- Floor area: 184 m^{2} (1,980 sq ft)

The former residence of Xu Guangda (simplified Chinese: 许光达故居; traditional Chinese: 許光達故居; pinyin: Xǔ Guāngdá Gùjū) was built in the late Qing dynasty in Huangxing Town, Changsha County, Hunan, China where a People's Liberation Army general who was conferred the Da jiang (Grand General) rank, Xu Guangda, was born. It has a building area of about 184 m^{2} (1,980 sq ft) and embodies buildings such as the old houses and the Exhibition Room. It is currently a significant tourist attraction in Changsha.

== History ==
The residence was built in the 34th Year of Emperor Guangxu (1908) in the Qing Dynasty with 14 rooms. On 19 November 1908, Xu Guangda was born in its front room. In 1954, a catastrophic flood destroyed some houses. In March 2005, when Vice-President Zeng Qinghong inspected Changsha County, he gave an order to renovate the residence. In 2011, it was listed as a provincial culture and relics site in Hunan by the Hunan Provincial Government.

== Architecture ==
=== Rangxian Stele ===
The Rangxian Stele with 2.5 m (8 ft 2 in) in height and 5 m (16 ft) in width and weighs 30 t (30 long tons; 33 short tons), is inscribed with a letter written by Xu Guangda to Mao Zedong to request Mao demote his military rank.

== Access ==
The Former Residence of Xu Guangda open to visitors for free.

Nearby attractions include the Former Residence of Huang Xing and the Tomb of Zuo Zongtang.

== Transportation ==
- Take bus No. 220 to Former Residence of Guangda Bus Stop (光达故居站).

== Gallery ==
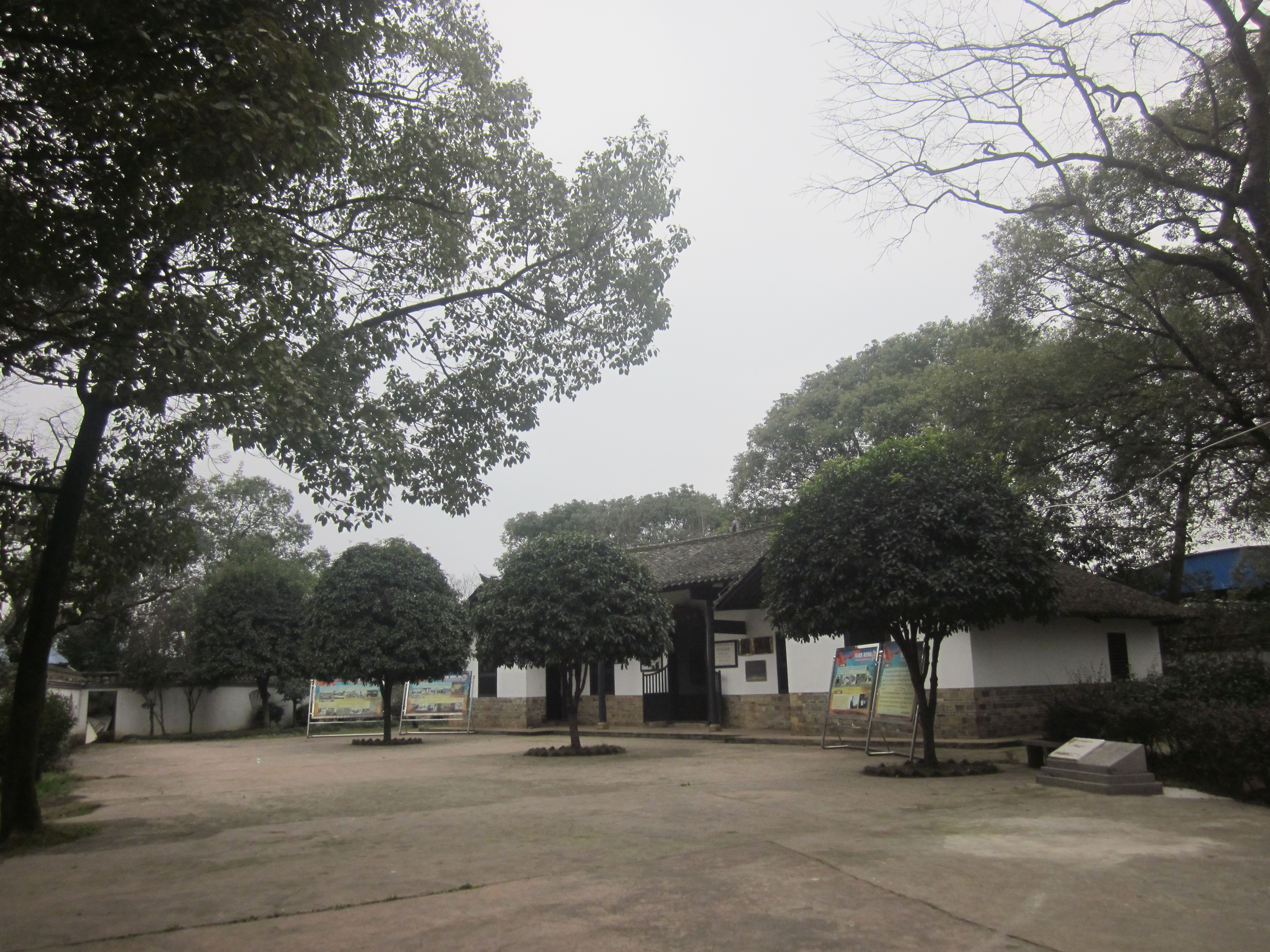
Former Residence of Xu Guangda.

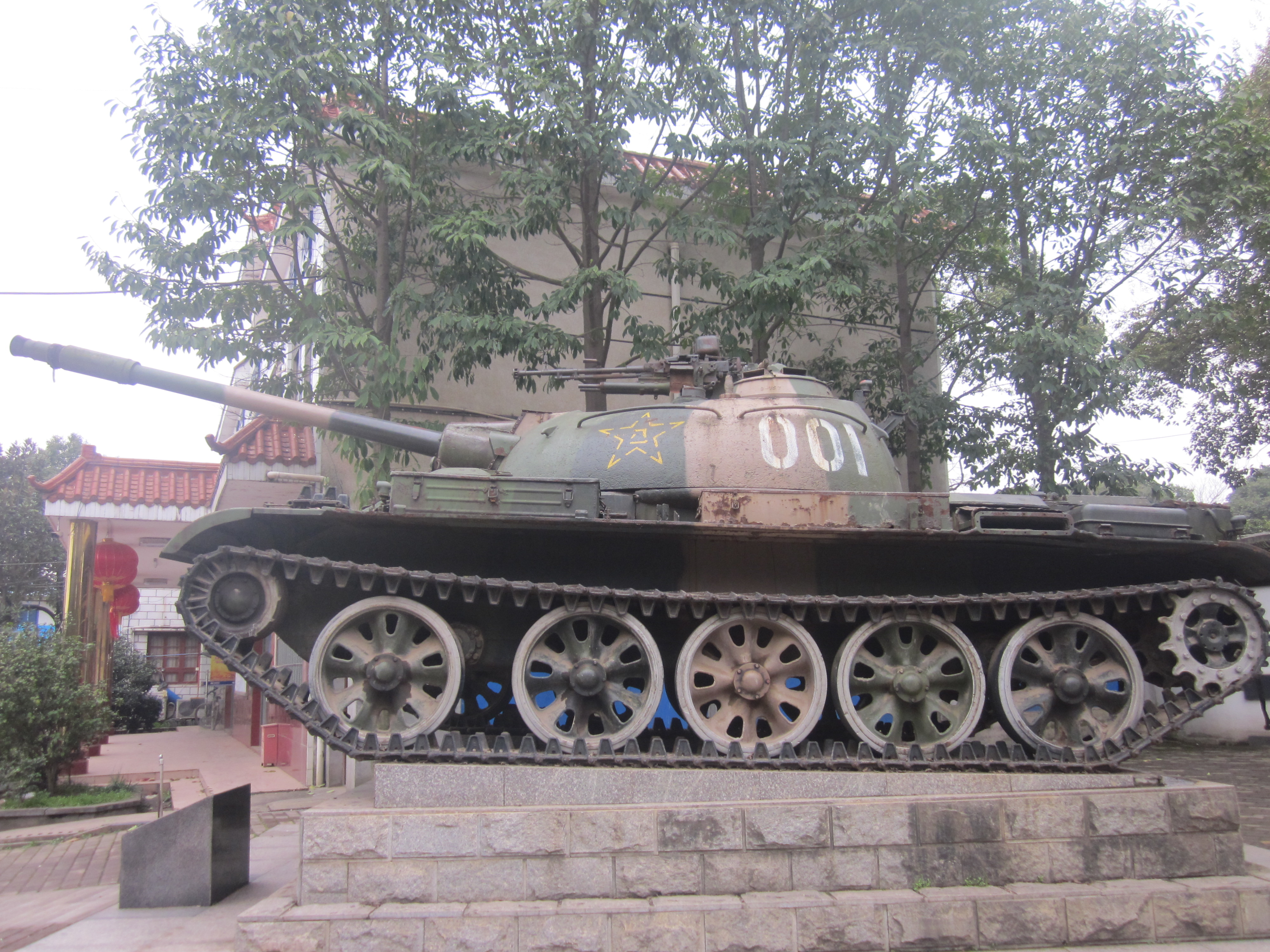
A tank in front of the Former Residence of Xu Guangda.

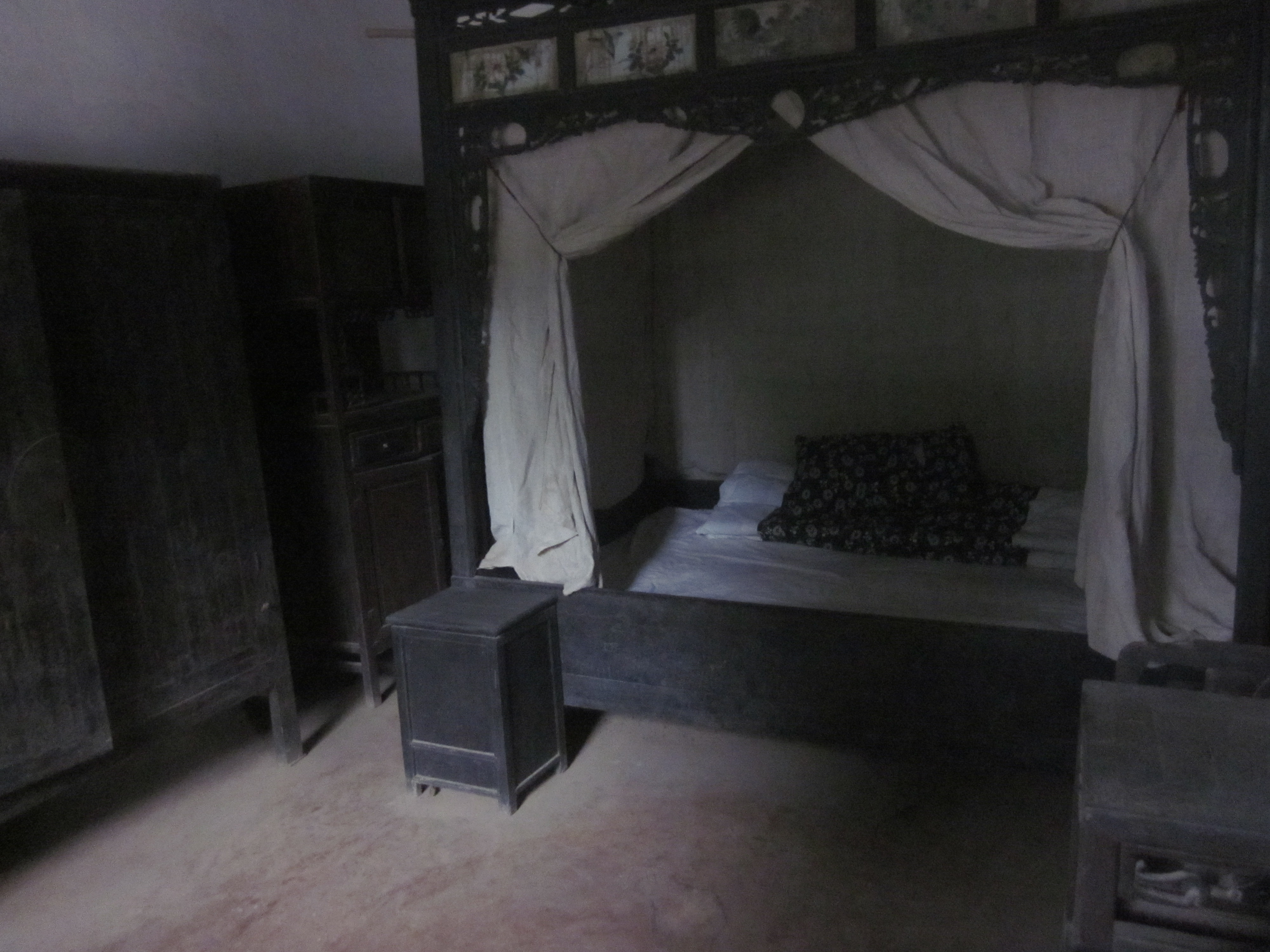
Bedroom of Xu Guangda.

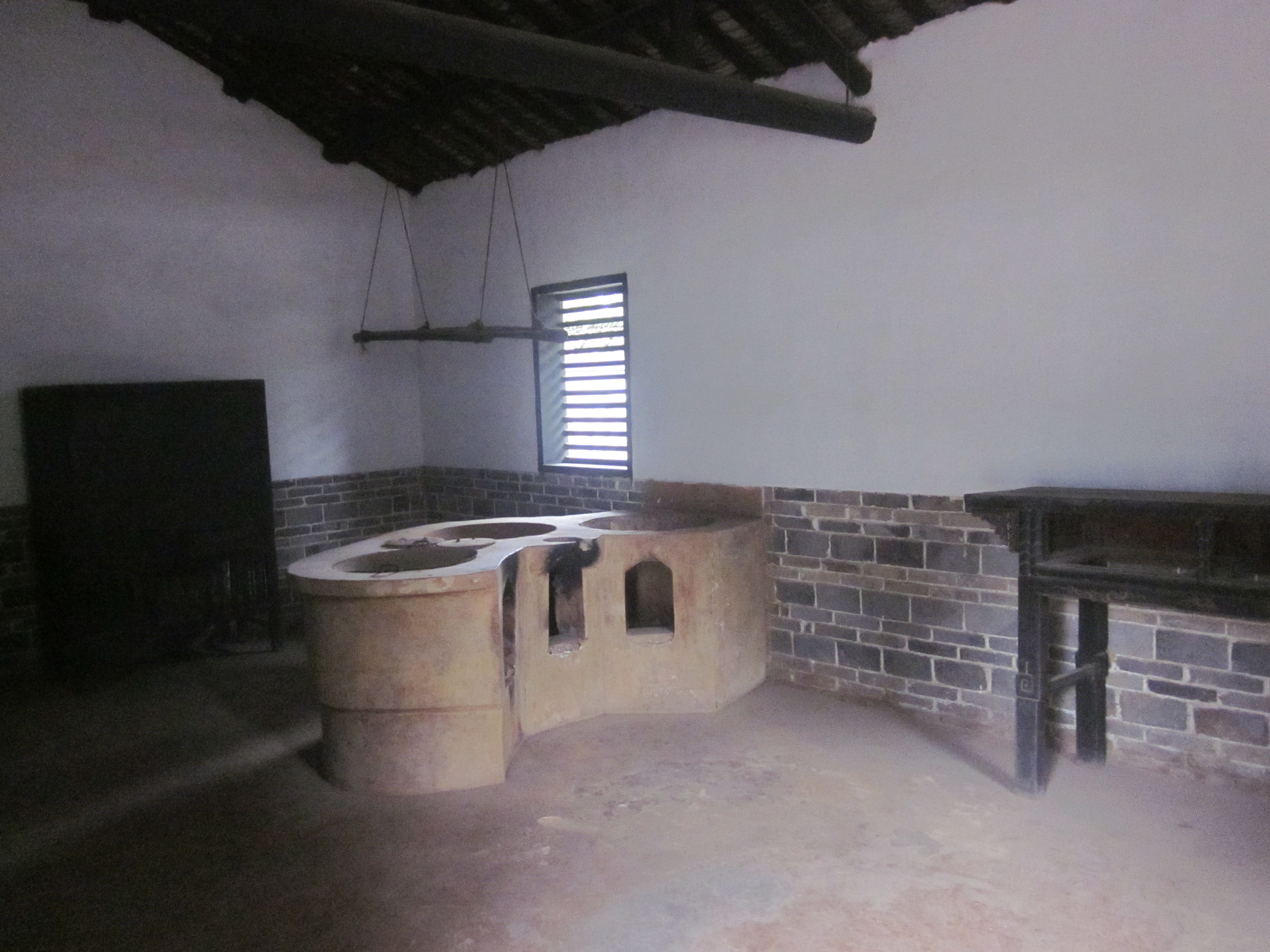
Kitchen.

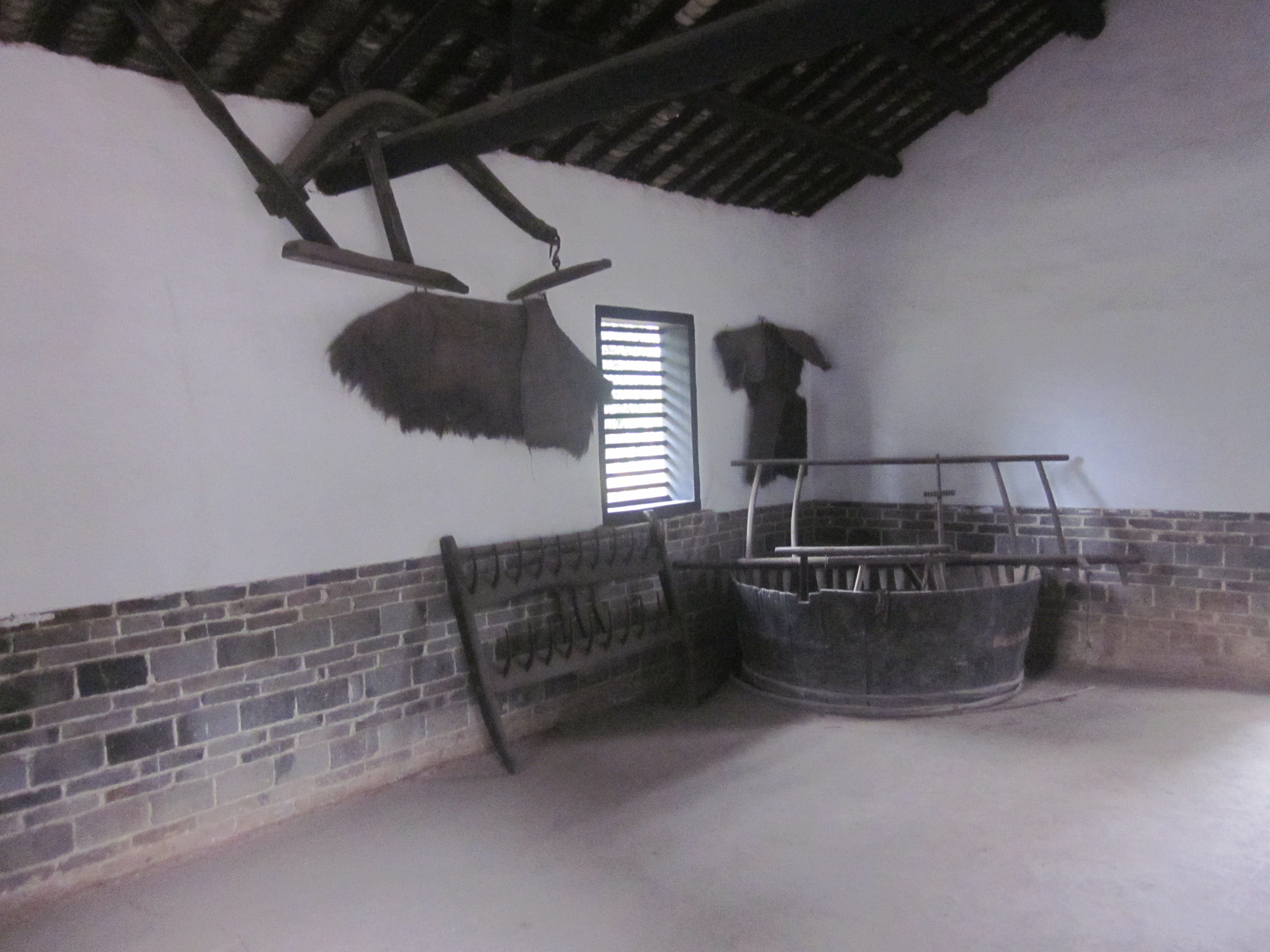
Implement shed.

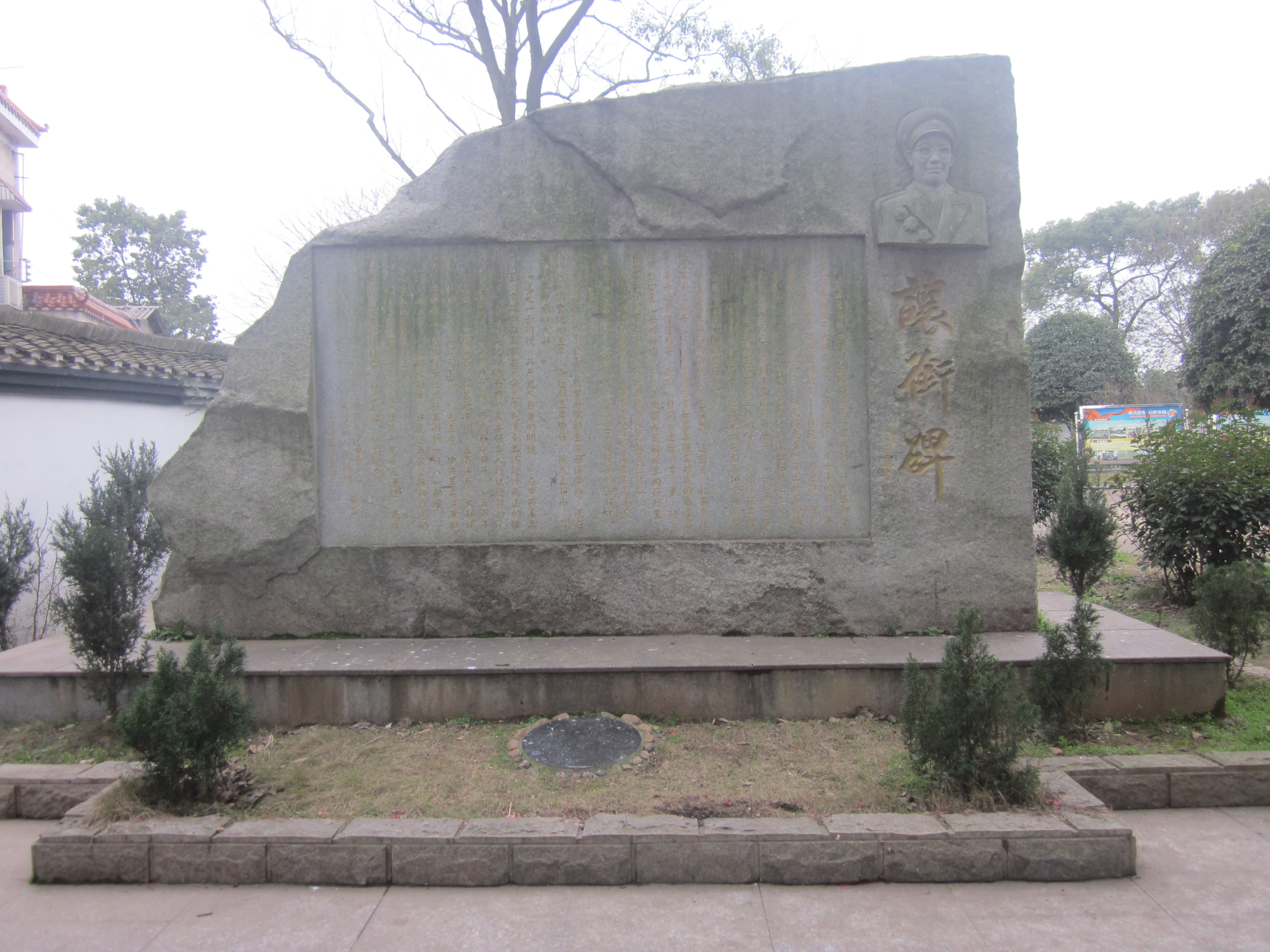
Rangxian Stele.

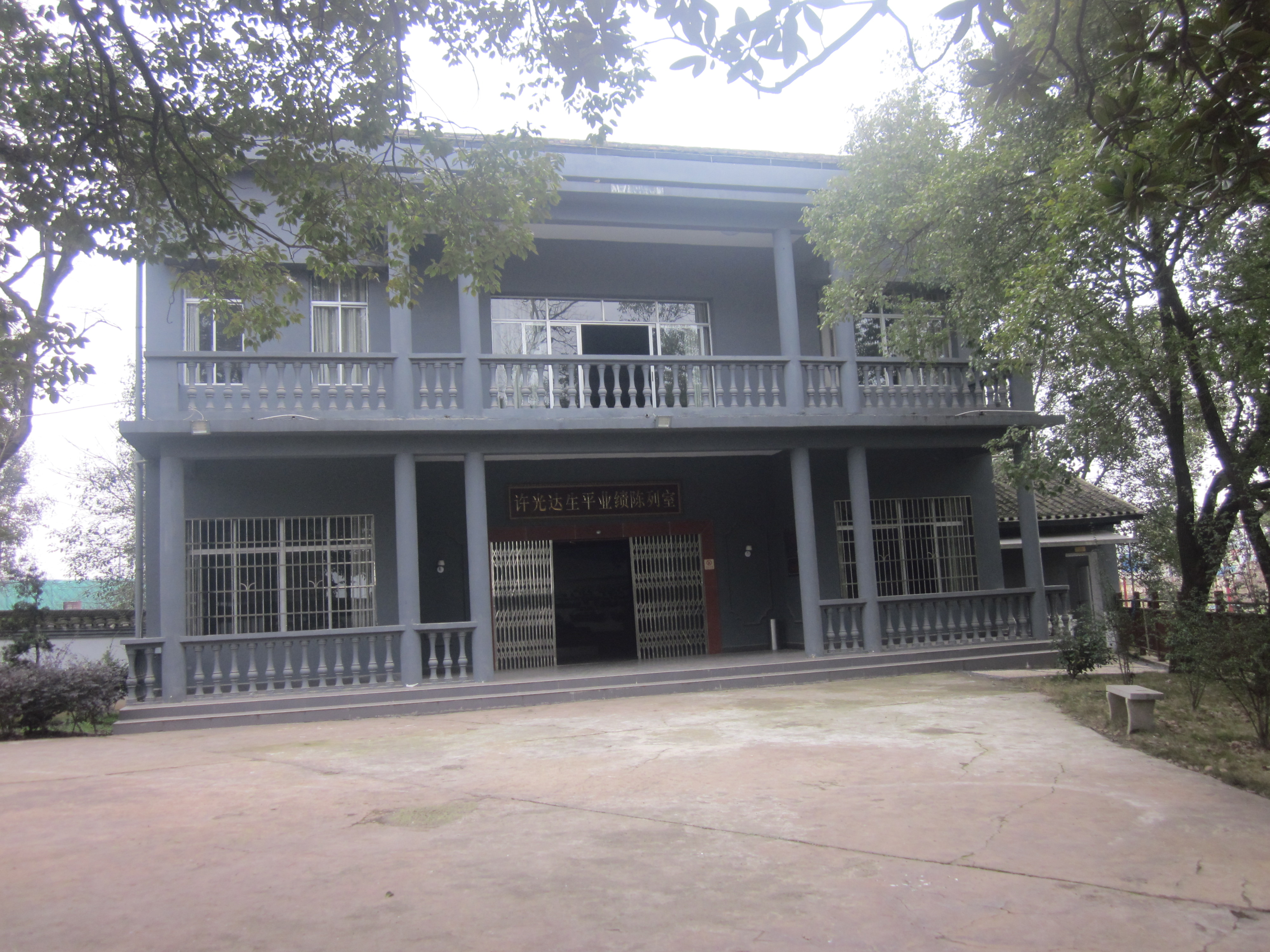
The Exhibition Room.
