= Former Residence of Huang Xing =

- 黄兴故居
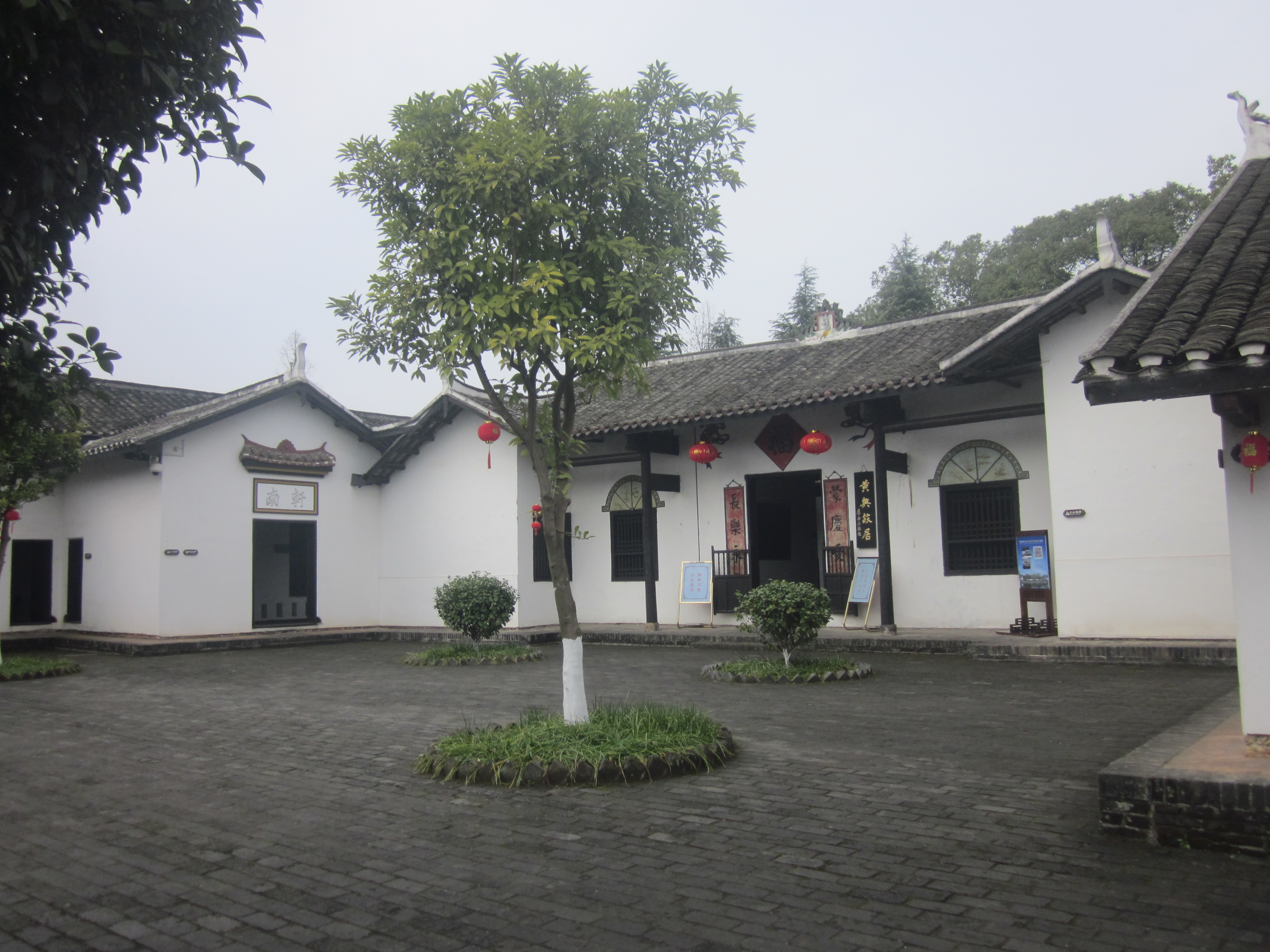
- Former Residence of Huang Xing

- Location within Hunan

General information
- Type: Traditional folk house
- Location: Huangxing Town, Changsha County, Hunan, China
- Coordinates: 28°07′17″N 113°06′40″E
- Completed: 1862

Height
- Roof: Gabbled roof

Technical details
- Floor area: 4,300 m^{2} (46,000 sq ft)

The Former Residence of Huang Xing or Huang Xing's Former Residence (simplified Chinese: 黄兴故居; traditional Chinese: 黃興故居; pinyin: Huáng Xīng Gùjū) is where Huang Xing was born and lived from 1874 to 1893. It is located in Huangxing Town of Changsha County, Hunan. Covering an area of 4,300-square-metre (46,000 sq ft), it has a total of 12 rooms, including Milling Room, Rice Milling Room, Grain Storehouse, Rice Storehouse, Kitchen, Reception Room, Bed Room, etc.

== History ==
The traditional folk house style residence was built by Huang Xing's ancestors during the 1st Year of Tongzhi Period of the Tongzhi Emperor (1862) in the Qing dynasty (1644–1911).

On October 25, 1874, Huang Xing was born in here.

In 1903, in order to raise money for the revolution, Huang Xing sold the house and his paddy field.

After the establishment of the Communist State, the local government seized the residence and distributed it among seven peasants.

In 1980, the Huang Xing Former Residence Memorial (黄兴故居纪念馆) was founded in here.

In 1981, the local government relocated the peasants and rebuilt the residence. At the same year, it was designated as provincial level key cultural heritage.

In 1984, the Exhibition Hall of Huang Xing's Life (黄兴生平事迹陈列馆) was added.

In 1988, it was listed as a "Major Historical and Cultural Site Protected at the National Level" by the State Council of China.

== Access ==
The Former Residence of Huang Xing open to visitors for free.

The Former Residence of Huang Xing is closed on Mondays, and is open from 9:00 to 17:00 daily.

Nearby attractions include the Former Residence of Xu Guangda and the Tomb of Zuo Zongtang.

== Transportation ==
- Take bus No. 220 to Former Residence of Huang Xing Bus Stop.

== Gallery ==
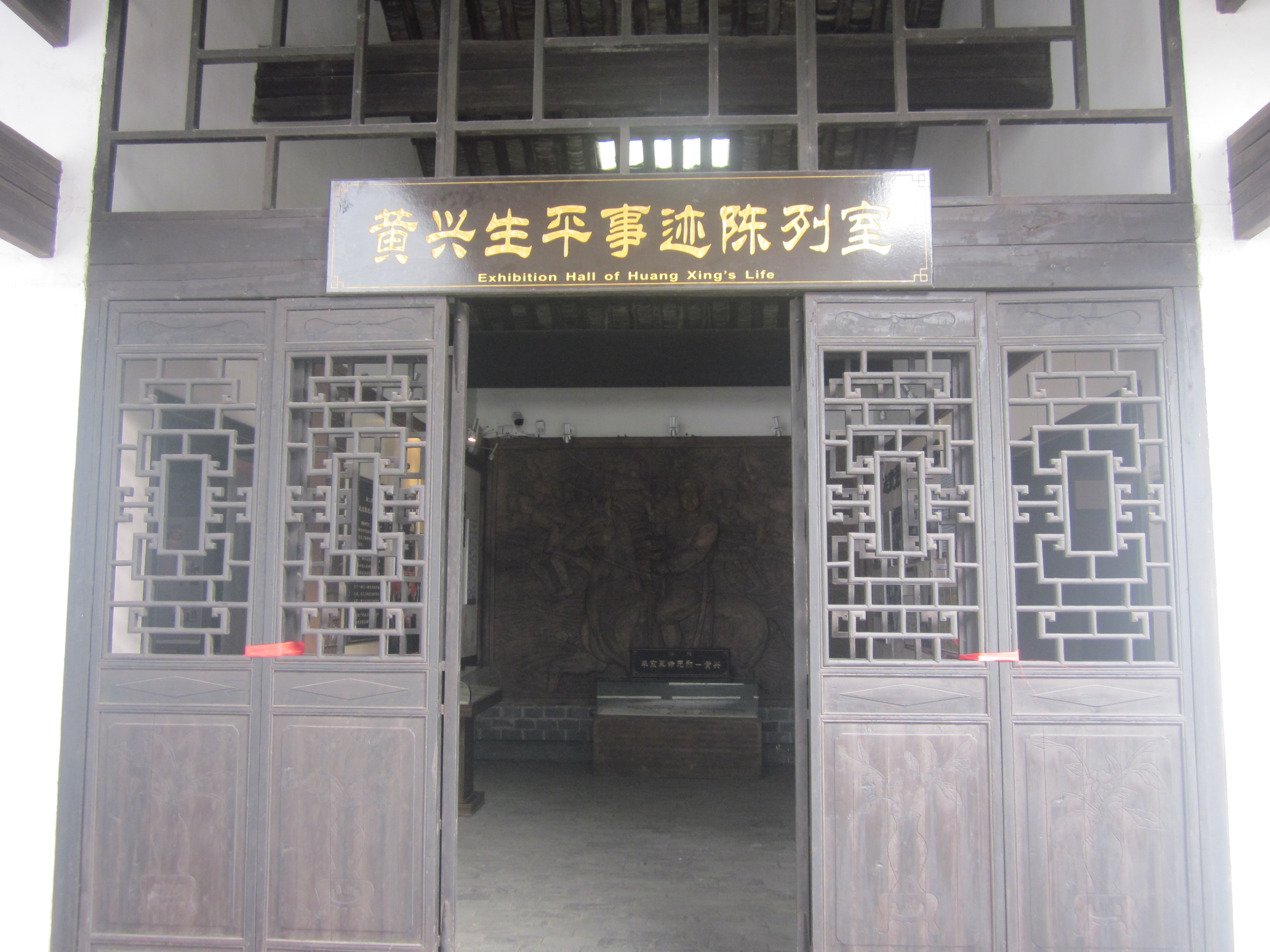
Exhibition Hall of Huang Xing's Life.

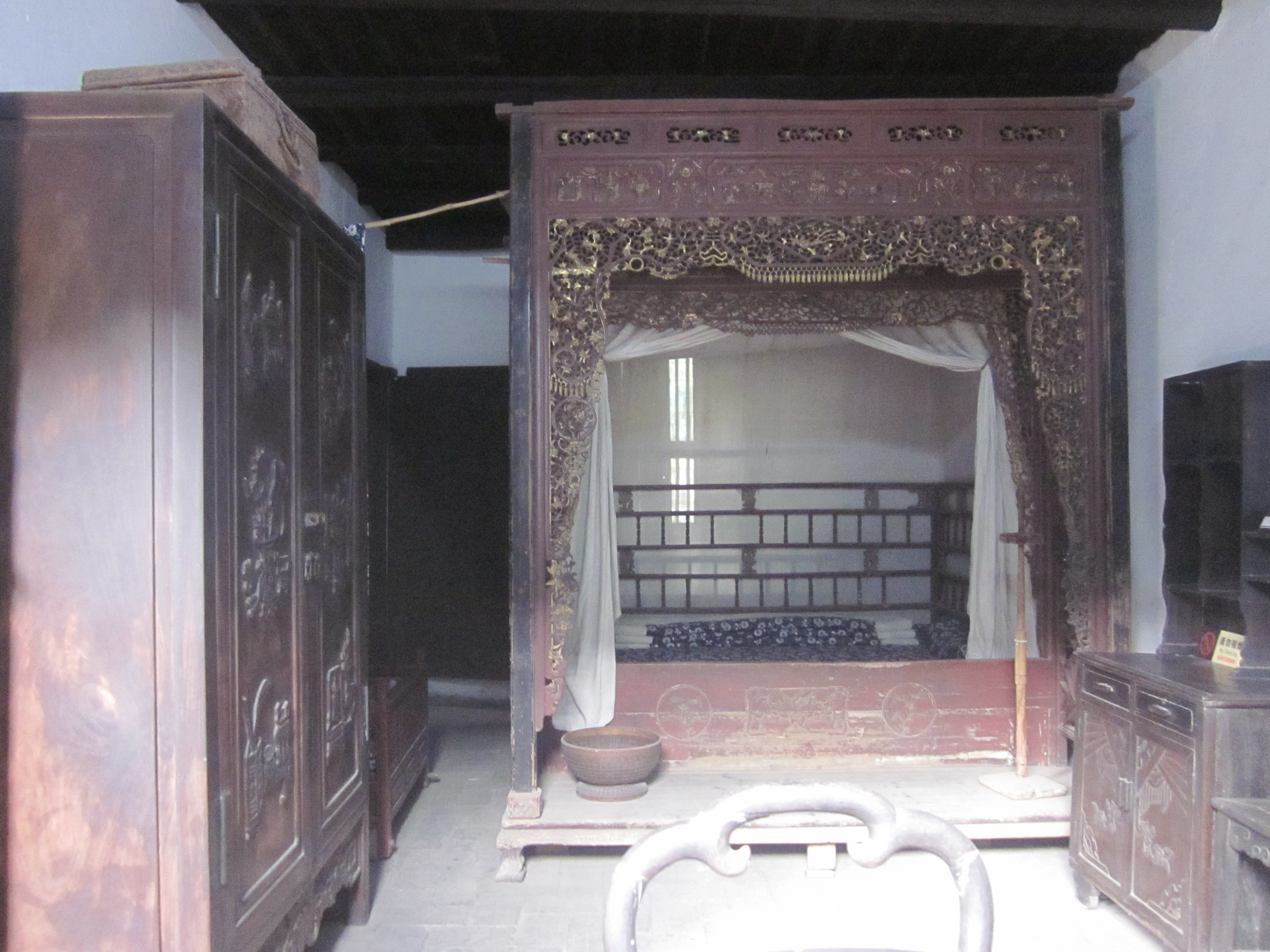
Huang Xing's Bedroom.

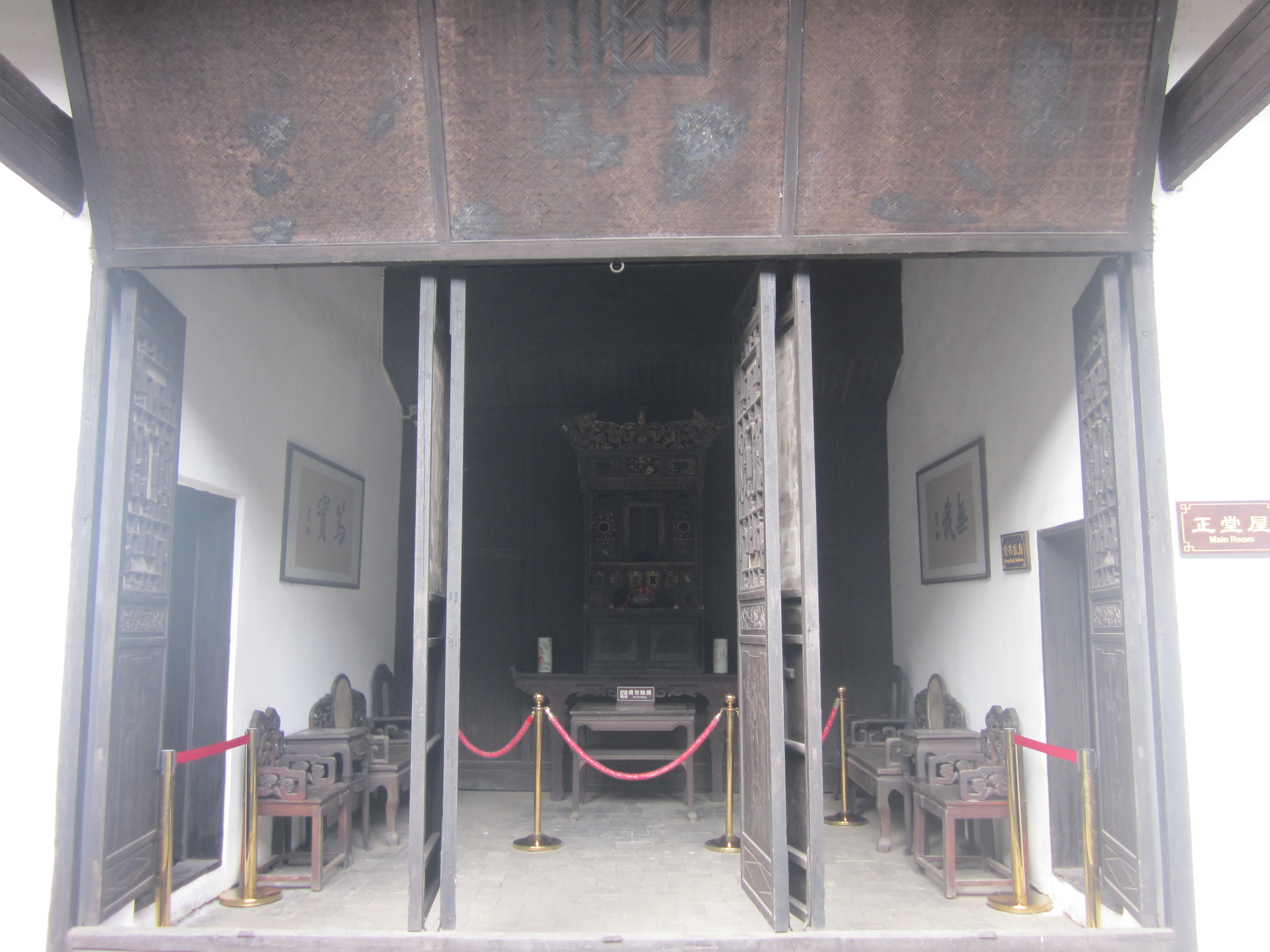
Main Room.

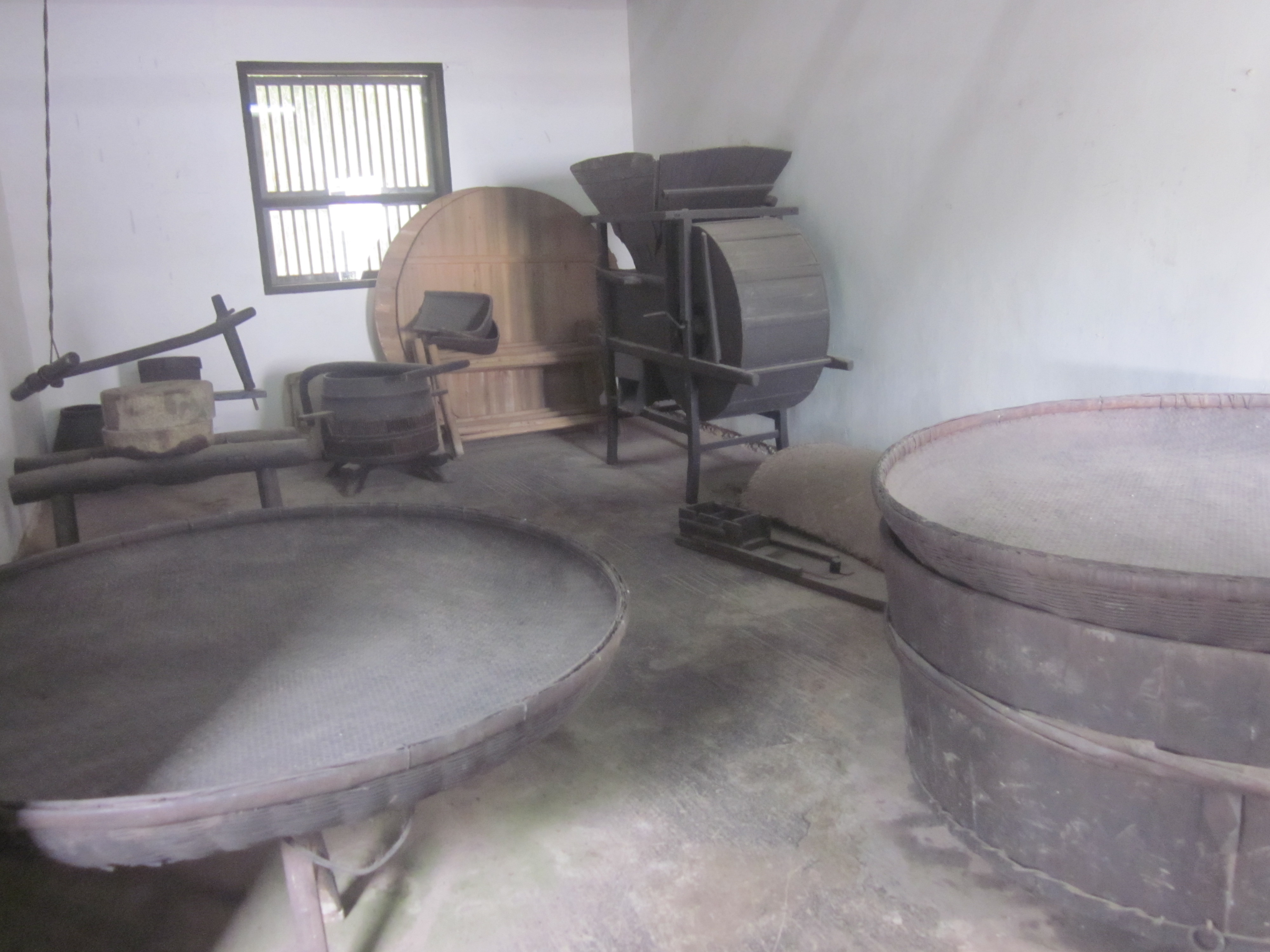
Rice Milling Room.

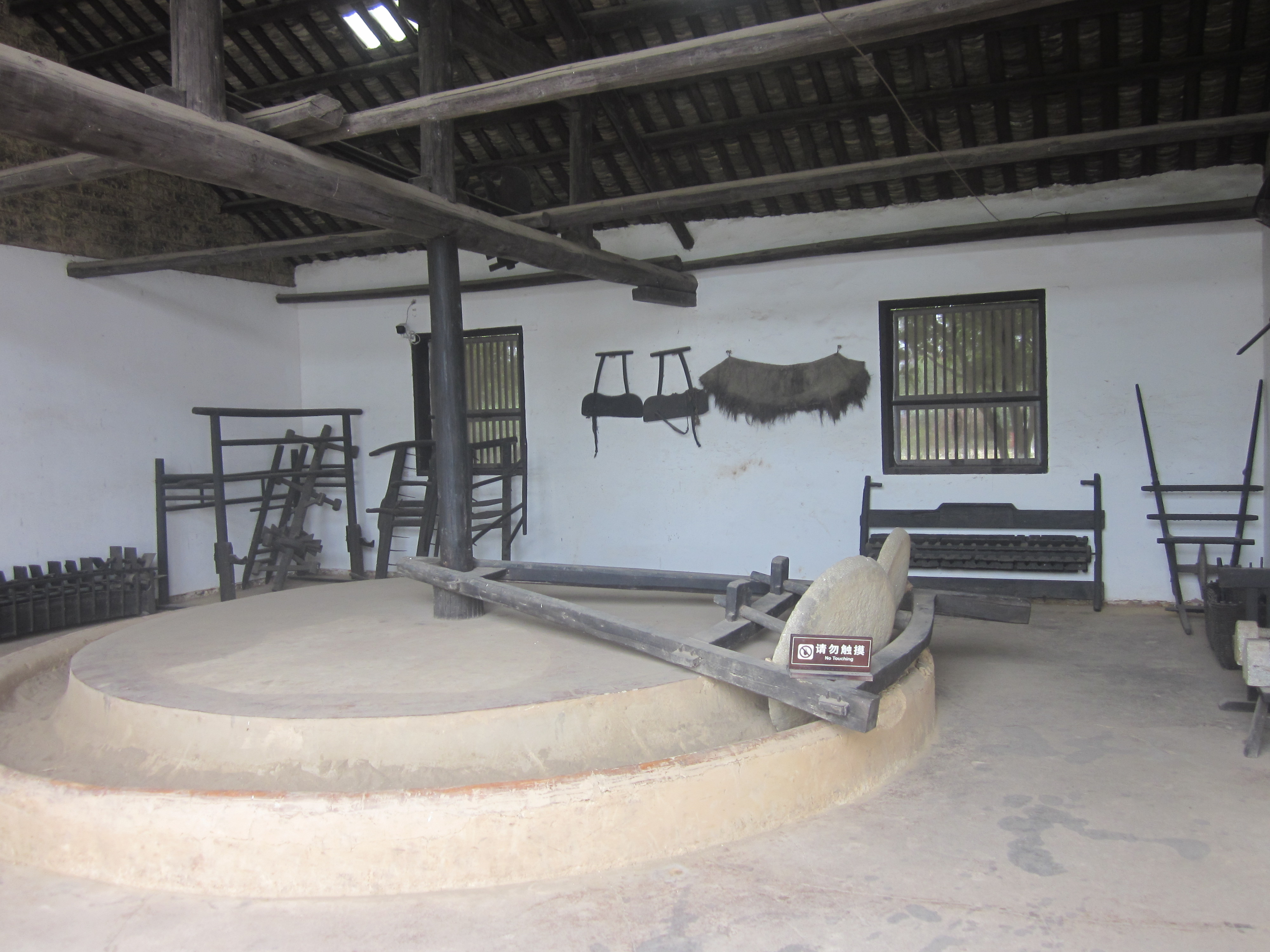
Milling Room.

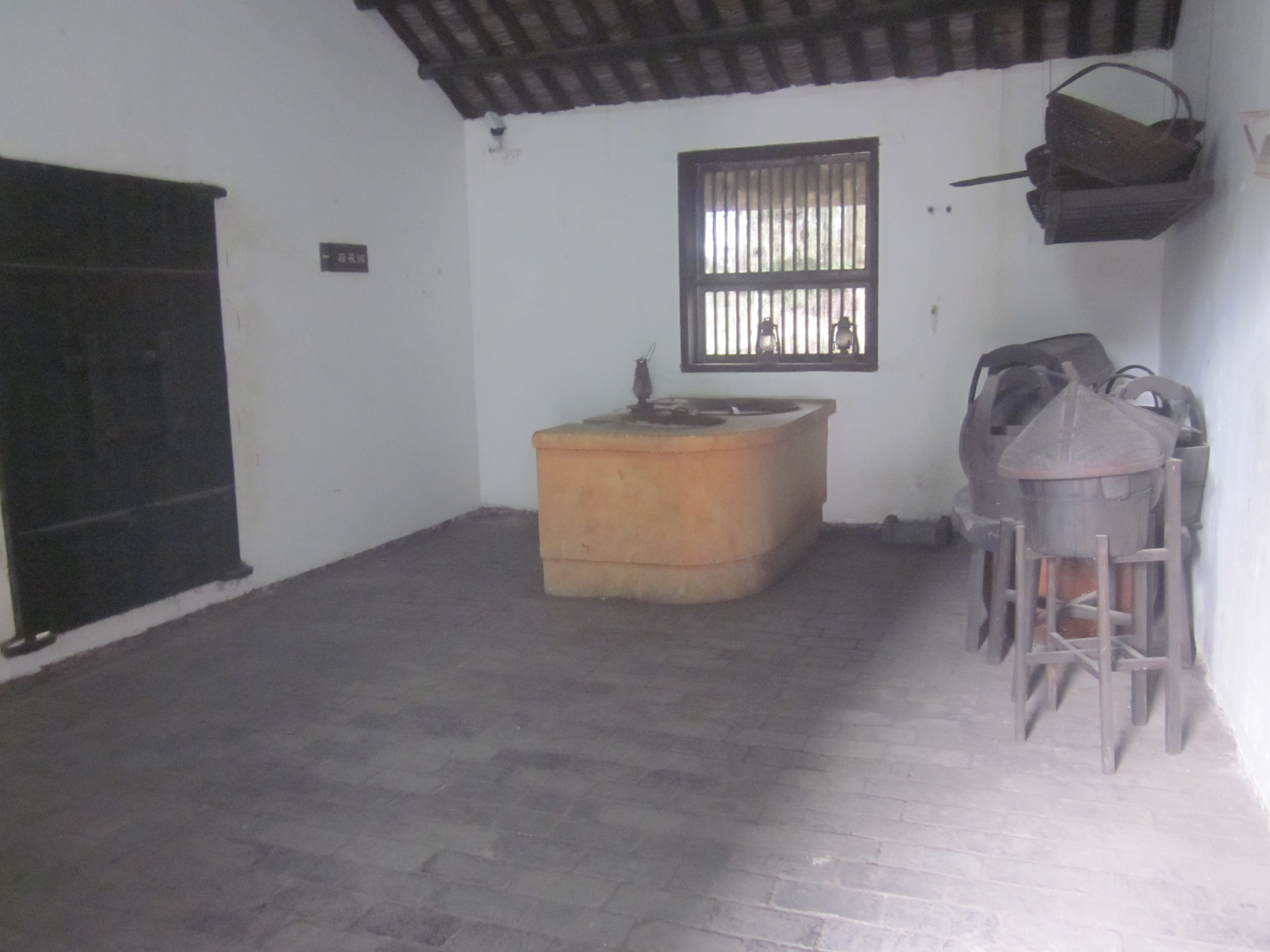
Kitchen.
