= Changsha International Convention and Exhibition Center =

- 长沙国际会展中心
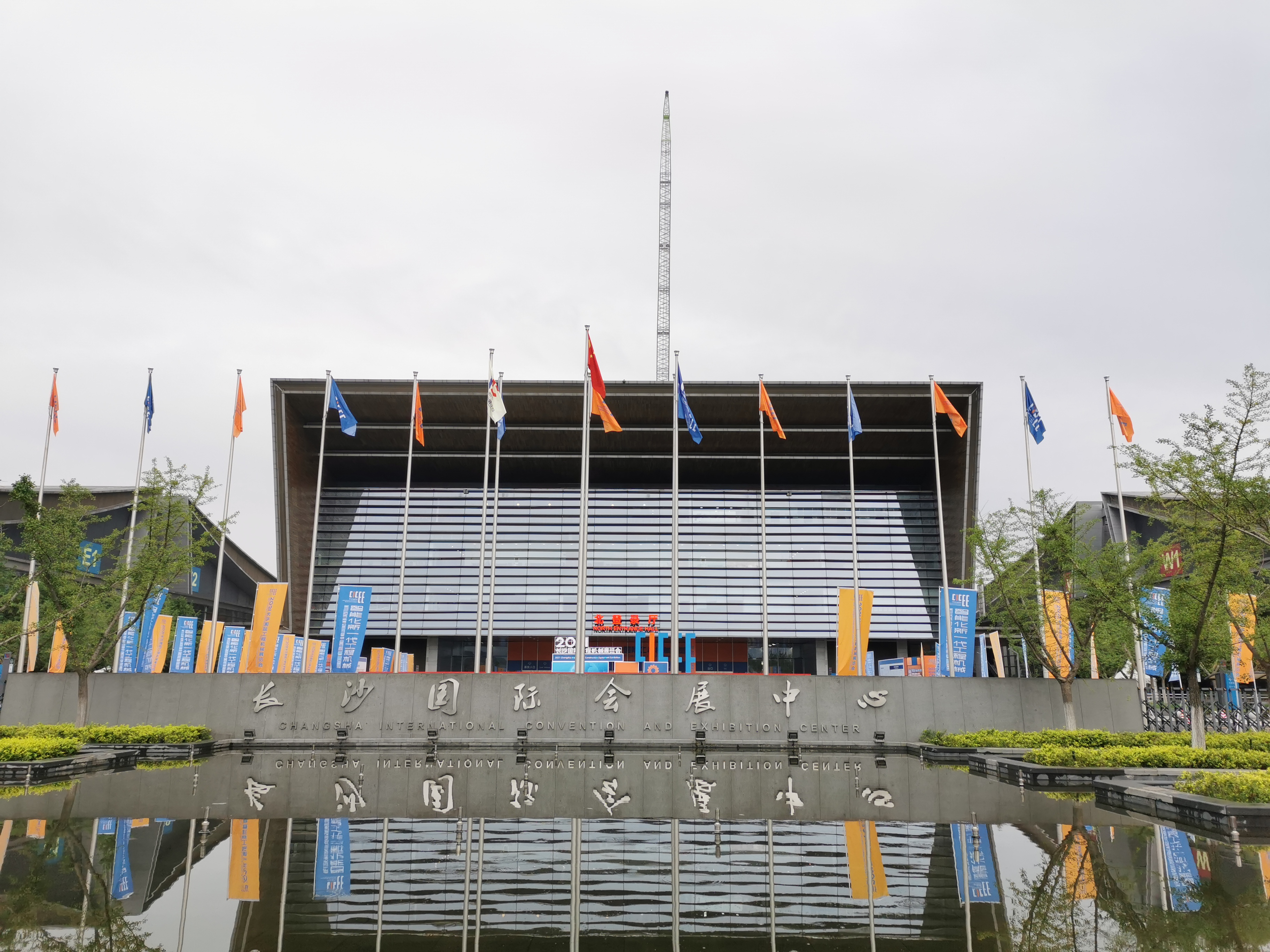
- Changsha International Convention and Exhibition Center in 2021

- Location within Hunan

General information
- Type: Modern architecture
- Location: Changsha County, Hunan, China
- Coordinates: 28°09′N 113°05′E
- Groundbreaking: 2015
- Completed: November 8, 2016
- Cost: ¥5.78 billion

Height
- Architectural: Chinese architecture

Technical details
- Material: Glass, steel, concrete
- Floor area: 445,000 m^{2} (4,790,000 sq ft)
- Grounds: 533,333 m^{2} (5,740,750 sq ft)

Design and construction
- Architecture firm: Tongji University Architectural Design and Research Institute (Group) Co., Ltd.

Chinese name
- Simplified Chinese: 长沙国际会展中心
- Traditional Chinese: 長沙國際會展中心
Transcriptions
Standard Mandarin
- Hanyu Pinyin: Chángshā Guójì Huìzhǎn Zhōngxīn

Changsha International Convention and Exhibition Center (Chinese: 长沙国际会展中心) is a large exhibition venue in the town of Huangxing, Changsha County, Hunan, China.

== History ==
Changsha International Convention and Exhibition Center was officially opened and began operation on 8 November 2016. The total investment in the project was nearly 5.78 billion. The project was constructed in two phases, with the initial phase involving an investment of around 4 billion yuan and comprising the first eight northern halls.

== Surrounding buildings ==
Several hotels are located near Changsha International Conference Center, providing accommodation for guests:

- Novotel Changsha International Exhibition Center
- Ibis Styles Changsha International Exhibition Center
- Steigenberger Icons Hotel Changsha

== Transportation ==
The most convenient way to reach Changsha International Convention and Exhibition Center by public transport is via the Changsha Metro, take Line 2 or Line 4 and alight at Guangda station. It is approximately a 600 m (2,000 ft) walk from the station to Changsha International Convention and Exhibition Center.
