= An Alarm to Awaken the Age =

1903 book by Chen Tianhua

- Author: Chen Tianhua
- Language: Traditional Chinese
- Publication date: 1903
- Publication place: Qing dynasty

An Alarm to Awaken the Age or The Alarm Bell (simplified Chinese: 警世钟; traditional Chinese: 警世鐘), also translated as A Bell to Warn the World, The Eternal Warning Bell, is a book written by Chen Tianhua that propagates the revolution against Manchu dynasty. It was published in 1903 in Tokyo, Japan.

An Alarm to Awaken the Age had a great impact at that time and was widely circulated. Chen denounced the crimes of the imperialist invasion of China and the traitorous acts of the Qing government. Subsequently, the book was banned by the Qing government.
