= Chen Tianhua =

19th and 20th-century Chinese revolutionary

Chen Tianhua 陳天華
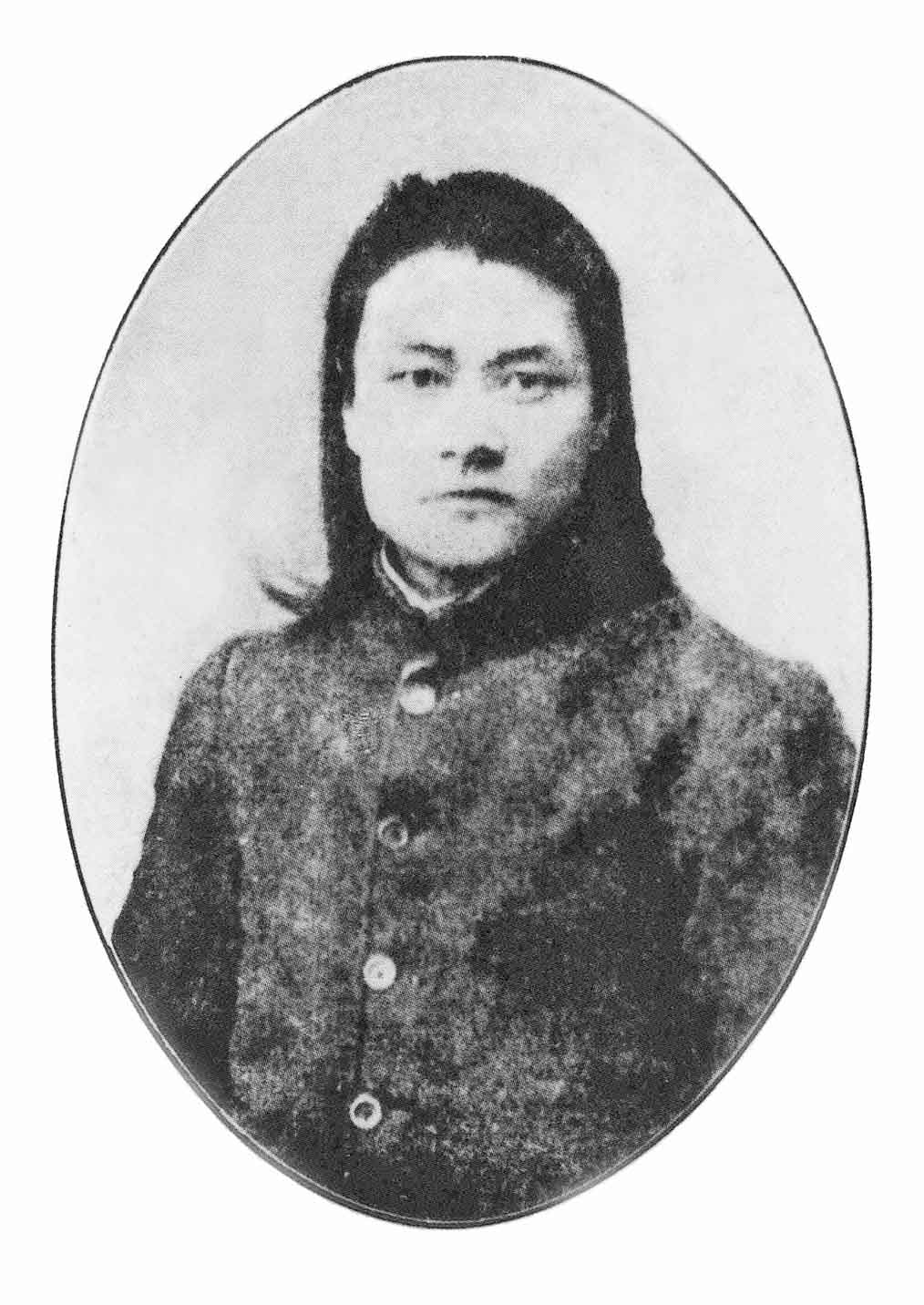
- Chen Tianhua
- Born: 1875; Xinhua, Province of Hunan, Qing Dynasty
- Died: 1905 (aged 29–30); Tokyo, Empire of Japan
- Cause of death: Suicide

Chen Tianhua (simplified Chinese: 陈天华; traditional Chinese: 陳天華; pinyin: Chén Tiānhuá; 1875 – December 1905) was a Chinese revolutionary born in Xinhua, Hunan province to a poor peasant family during the Qing dynasty.

== Biography ==
=== Early life and education ===
Chen did not begin his formal education until he was fifteen. He did study Chinese classics from local teacher. He enrolled into the new-style Qiushi Academy in his hometown Xinhua in the late 1890s.

=== Political career ===
After receiving the shengyuan degree in 1902, Chen was sponsored by the academy to study in Japan in 1903 on a government scholarship. He became a radical politician soon after reaching Japan, and wrote two pamphlets which were popular among revolutionaries, A Sudden Look Back and An Alarm to Awaken the Age. He returned to China after seven months and helped found an anti-Qing revolutionary group engaged in insurrection in Changsha, Hunan. He was forced twice to flee to Japan after the closure of his journal Liyu Bao and the failure of a planned insurrection against Qing.

In response to Russian and Japanese imperialism in Manchuria, he used his blood to write a few dozen letters that were distributed in schools in China. He was an editor of newspaper The People's Daily, and wrote a novel called The Lion's Roar.

Chen Tianhua wrote in May 1903, a two part critique published in the Shanghai journal Subao entitled On the Corrupt and Rotten Hunan guanbao. Chen criticized the gazette's contents for being too militant, prodding it to add essays and news and to slip free of the provincial authorities.

He joined the Anti-Russia Voluntary Patriotic Corps and in 1903 which he reorganized into the Headquarters of National (Guomin Zonghui) along with Zou Rong. The organization quickly evolved into the anti-Manchu Association for the National Military Education (Junguomin Jiaoyuhui). A few months later, Chen returned to China as a representative of the association to promote revolution. In early 1904 Chen, together with his fellow Hunanese Huang Xing and Song Jiaoren, founded the underground revolutionary society China Arise Society (Huaxinghui) in Changsha. He worked with other members of the society to incite armed uprisings among the Qing troops and secret societies.

He integrated traditional values into a pattern of racial unity in his pamphlets, which were read throughout the Yangzi valley. He argued that men are close only to people of their own family, and that when two families fight, one only assists one's own family. He argued that the Han race was one big family, and that the Yellow Emperor is the great ancestor. All those who were not Han were from exterior families. Kin terms were infused into racial rhetoric that called for emotional expressions. "Racial feeling begins at birth. For the members of one's own race, there is surely mutual intimacy and love: for the members of a foreign race, there is surely mutual savagery".

In 1905 Chen helped Sun Yat-sen found the Tongmenghui. He committed suicide in Tokyo Bay by drowning himself to protest against Japanese restrictions imposed on the activities of Chinese students in December 1905.
