= Ganshan, Changsha =

Ganshan Township 干杉乡
- Township
- Location in Hunan
- Coordinates: 28.1399°N 113.1982°E
- Country: China
- Province: Hunan
- Prefecture-level city: Changsha
- County: Changsha

Area
  - Total: 69.7 km^{2} (26.9 sq mi)

Population (2000)
  - Total: 22,097
  - Density: 317/km^{2} (821/sq mi)
- Time zone: UTC+8 (China Standard)

Ganshan Township (Chinese: 干杉乡) is a township in Changsha County, Changsha, Hunan Province, China. It administers eight administrative villages and one community. Ganshan township merged to Huangxing town on November 19, 2015.
