= A Sudden Look Back =

1903 work by Chen Tianhua

- Author: Chen Tianhua
- Publisher: Japan Tokyo Press
- Publication date: 1903

A Sudden Look Back or Suddenly Turn Around (simplified Chinese: 猛回头; traditional Chinese: 猛回頭), also translated as Sudden Awakening, Sudden Enlightenment, is a propaganda pamphlet written by Chen Tianhua. It was originally published in Tokyo in 1903 as an anti-Manchu pamphlet.

A Sudden Look Back accuses the Western powers of invading China, states to the Chinese people the crisis facing China, points out that the Qing government has become the "royal court of the foreigners". It further criticizes the rescue of the emperor to establish a constitution, propagates the anti-imperialist and anti-Manchu revolution, and establishes a democratic republican system.
