= Huang Chen-hua =

Chinese politician

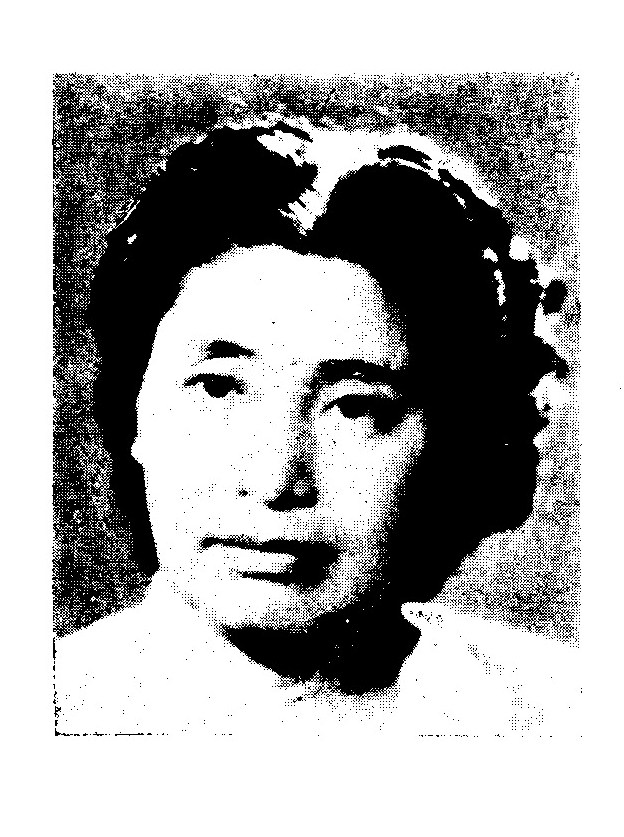

Member of the Legislative Yuan
- In office 1948–1989
- Constituency: Hunan

Huang Chen-hua (Chinese: 黃振華) was a Chinese politician. She was among the first group of women elected to the Legislative Yuan in 1948.

== Biography ==
The oldest daughter of revolutionary leader Huang Xing, Huang attended university in the United States, earning bachelor's and master's degrees from the Teachers College of Columbia University. Returning to China, she became a university professor and education inspector. She worked at the Ministry of Education as an editor and became a member of the Exam Committee. She also served as an advisor to the Executive Yuan and established her own school, becoming its principal.

In the 1948 elections to the Legislative Yuan Huang ran as a Kuomintang candidate in Hunan Province and was elected to parliament. She relocated to Taiwan during the Chinese Civil War.
