= Zou Rong =

Chinese writer (1885–1905)

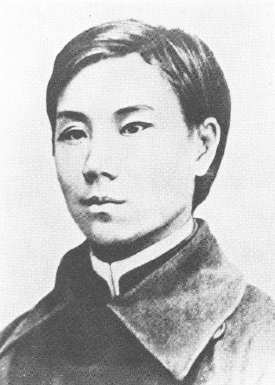
- Born: 1885; Chongqing, Qing China
- Died: April 3, 1905 (aged 20); Shanghai International Settlement
- Known for: Writing The Revolutionary Army

Zou Rong (Chinese: 鄒容; pinyin: Zōu Róng; Wade–Giles: Tsou Jung; 1885 – 1905) was a Han Chinese nationalist and revolutionary martyr of the anti-Manchu movement. He was born in Chongqing, Sichuan Province, his ancestors having moved there from Meizhou, Guangdong area. Zou was sent to Japan at an early age, where he studied and observed Japanese modernization.

When he returned to China, he started to write essays on how to free the Chinese nation from the Manchu regime and foreign imperialism. In 1903, he published a book on this topic: The Revolutionary Army (革命軍; Gémìng Jūn). The deeply patriotic book, informed by Republicanism and Social Darwinist racial theories, was widely read and had a profound influence on the revolutionary movement. Thousands of copies of the book were distributed internationally by Sun Yat-sen in support of the revolutionary cause.

Zou found the Qing government unable to deal with the contemporary crisis of colonization, weakness, and corruption. For Zou, the Manchu were the source of China's inability to overcome traditional obstacles for modern reforms, and he analyzed their mistakes and weaknesses point by point. Moreover, he condemned China's traditional monarchical system, which had made the Han Chinese "slaves" rather than "citizens." He was also influenced by racialist Han ideology, as evidenced in his distaste for the Manchu governing class, as he advocated “genocide [of] the five million and more of the furry and horned Manchu race, cleansing ourselves of 260 years of harsh and unremitting pain, so that the soil of the Chinese subcontinent is made immaculate, and the descendants of the Yellow Emperor will all become Washingtons.”

His calls for sovereignty of the Chinese people included the establishment of a parliament, equal rights for women, freedom of speech and freedom of the press. These seemingly liberal ideals were underpinned by a potentially genocidal ethnic nationalism; it was not the liberty of the individual, but the sovereignty of the ethnic nation-state ("A man cannot live without his country") that formed the foundations for the Republic of China as envisioned by Zou Rong.

Zou lived in a foreign concession in Shanghai where he enjoyed extraterritorial rights and could not be sentenced to death by a Qing Court. Instead, he was closely associated with Zhang Binglin and implicated in the Su Bao incident as a result, which rendered him a prison sentence of two years; he fell ill while incarcerated and died in April 1905 at the age of 20.

== Bibliography ==
- Zou Rong; Lust, John (trans.): The Revolutionary Army : a Chinese Nationalist Tract of 1903. Paris: Mouton, 1968.
- Hummel, Arthur W. Sr., ed. (1943). "Tsou Jung" . Eminent Chinese of the Ch'ing Period. United States Government Printing Office.
