= Su Bao =

Chinese newspaper, closed 1903

Su Bao (Jiangsu Daily or Jiangsu Journal) was a small-circulation newspaper which circulated in the Shanghai International Settlement, China in the late Qing Dynasty. The newspaper, owned by Chen Fan and edited by Zhang Shizhao of the Patriotic Study Society, was being published in January 1900. It advocated reform and radicalism and supported the Patriotic Academy. Su Bao was closed down by the authorities in 1903.

== Suppression ==
In the summer of 1903, Su Bao was suppressed. It had published a series of articles about overthrowing the monarchy and realizing republicanism. At that time the pioneer of democratic revolution minister Zou Rong published Revolutionary Army. Su Bao not only published the description of Revolutionary Army written by Zou Rong, the Preface of Revolutionary Army, written by Zhang Binglin, and Introduction of Revolution Army, written by Zhang Shizhao, but also spoke highly of them.

On June 29, Su Bao published another article, The Relationship between Kang Youwei and Sir Jue Luo, which not only opposed Kang Youwei for his opinion of supporting constitution and refusing revolution, but also challenged Emperor Guangxu and Empress Dowager Cixi. On the same day that the article was published, foreign concession government arrested Zhang Binglin and Zou Rong, and then closed down the newspaper. The Qing government was urged to execute Zhang Binglin and Zou Rong. However, because of huge social pressure, the concession areas sentenced them to life imprisonment in their first trial. Afterwards the authorities were forced to change the sentence of Zhang Binglin to three years and that of Zou Rong to two years.

== Significance ==
The case is memorable in Chinese newspaper history. The feudal class never allowed speeches of offence to governors in order to maintain authoritarian rules. They used literary inquisition as their weapon to control those who dared to say something, especially in Qing and Ming Dynasty. Since modern times when newspapers came into being, rulers were trying to suppress and control them. Su Bao case showed a conflict between feudal rulers and modern progressive thought, and may be the oldest and most typical literary inquisition in the press during the history of China.
