= Huangxing, Changsha =

Huangxing Town 黄兴镇
- Town
- Location in Hunan
- Coordinates: 28.1287°N 113.1273°E
- Country: People's Republic of China
- Province: Hunan
- Prefecture-level city: Changsha
- County: Changsha

Area
  - Total: 79 km^{2} (31 sq mi)

Population (2000)
  - Total: 43,892
  - Density: 560/km^{2} (1,400/sq mi)
- Time zone: UTC+8 (China Standard)

Huangxing Town (simplified Chinese: 黄兴镇; traditional Chinese: 黃興鎮; pinyin: Huángxīng Zhèn) is a town in Changsha County, Hunan province, China. It contains two communities and 11 villages. Ganshan township merged with Huangxing on November 19, 2015.
