= Wenjiashi =

Wenjiashi Town 文家市镇
- Town
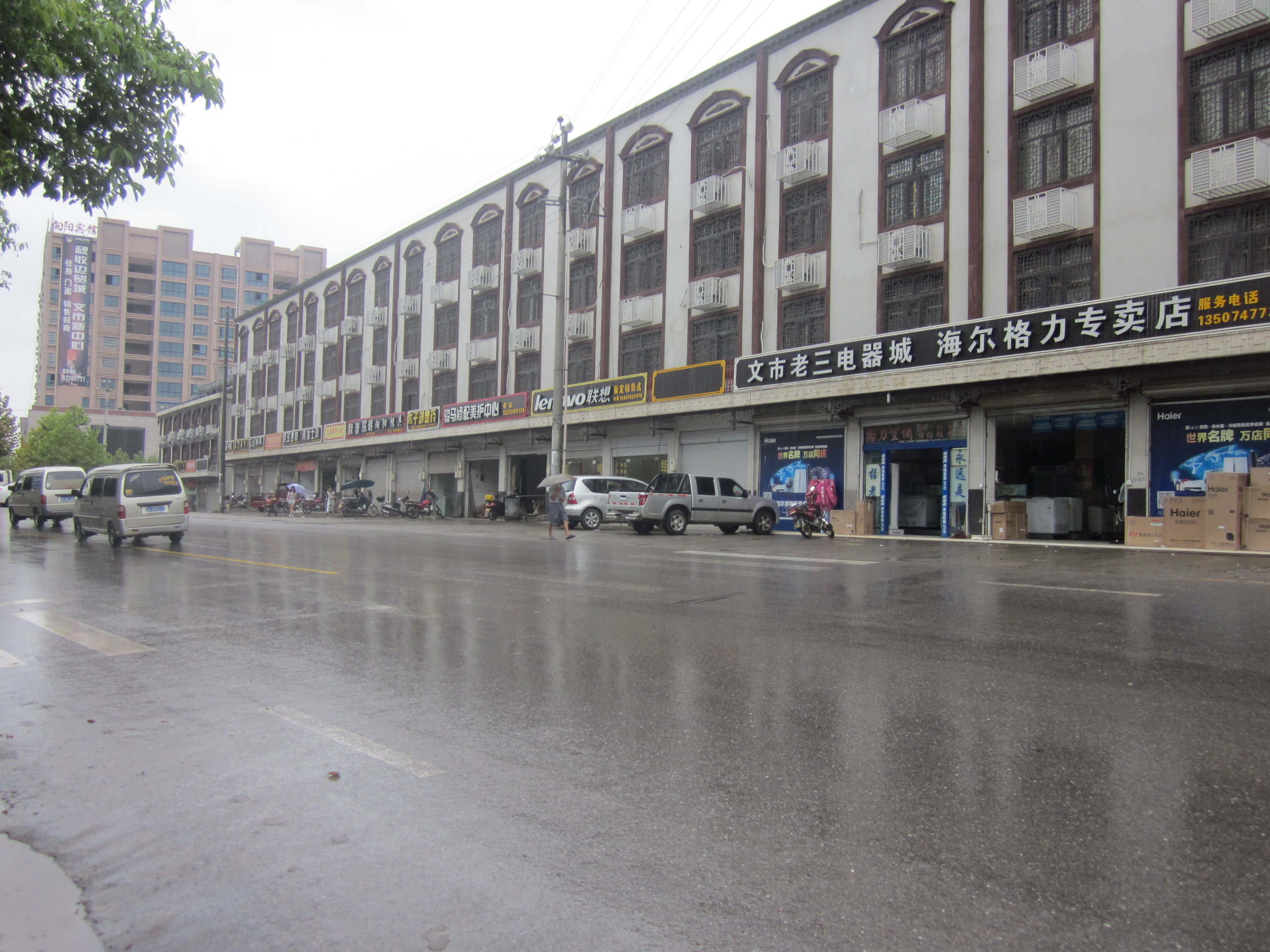
- Residential buildings on both sides of the street.

- Location in Hunan
- Coordinates: 28°03′04″N 113°56′13″E
- Country: People's Republic of China
- Province: Hunan
- Prefecture-level city: Changsha
- County-level city: Liuyang

Area
  - Total: 155.9 km^{2} (60.2 sq mi)

Population
  - Total: 53,800
  - Density: 345/km^{2} (894/sq mi)
- Time zone: UTC+8 (China Standard)
- Postal code: 410315
- Area code: 0731

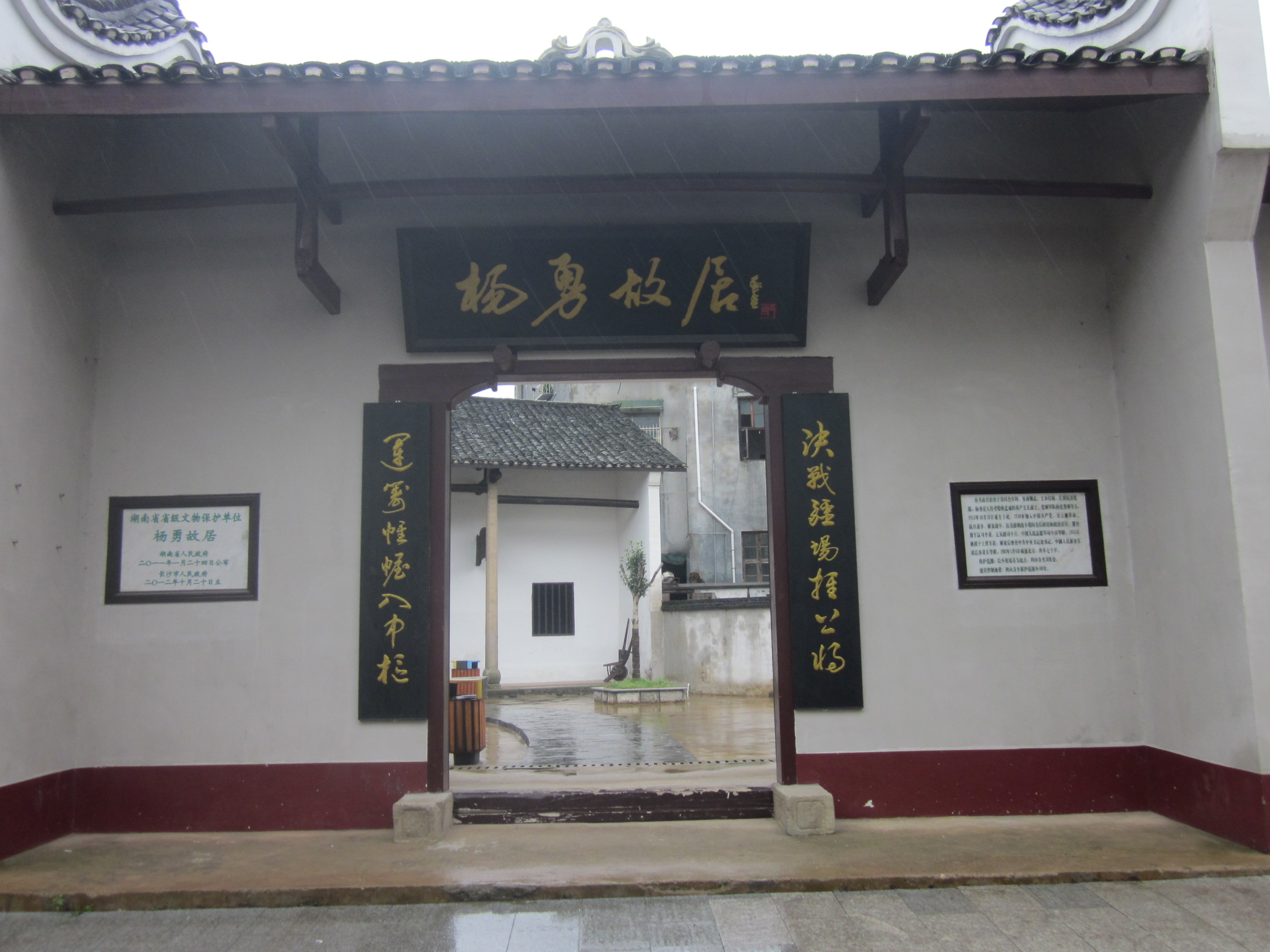
Former Residence of Yang Yong.

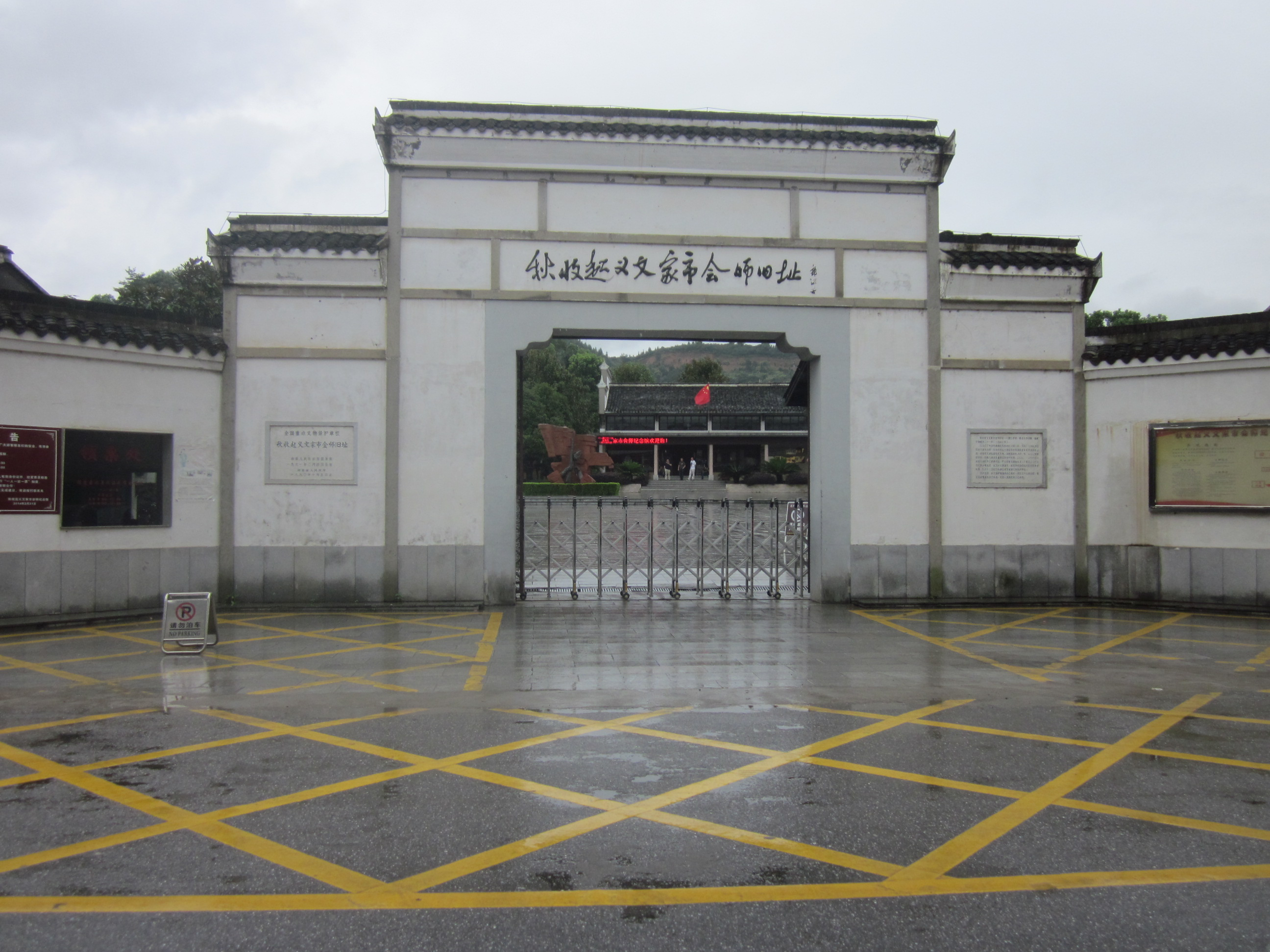
Site of Joining Forces in Wenjiashi of Autumn Harvest Uprising.

Wenjiashi Town (simplified Chinese: 文家市镇; traditional Chinese: 文家市鎮; pinyin: Wénjiāshì Zhèn) is an urban town in Liuyang, Hunan, People's Republic of China. As of the 2016 census it had a population of 53,800 and an area of 155.9 square kilometres (60.2 sq mi). It borders the towns of Zhonghe and Yonghe in the north, Wanzai County in the east, Chengtanjiang Town in the west, and Yichun and Pingxiang in the south.

== History ==
Wenjiashi is located at the border of Hunan and Jiangxi and it was the place where forces gathered during the Autumn Harvest Uprising. The first army flag of Chinese Red Army was raised here and the "encircle the cities from the rural areas" policy-making thoughts germinated from here. It is a source place and birthplace of Chinese revolutionaries. Now, it has one state-level cultural relic protection unit, three provincial-level cultural relic protection units, three municipal-level cultural relic protection units and it was rated as a "Historic and Cultural Town of Hunan" in 2010.

== Administrative divisions ==
The town is divided into 11 villages and one community, which include the following areas: Wenjiashi Community, Wushen Village, Baixi Village, Yanqian Village, Xinfa Village, Yongfeng Village, Shuangtian Village, Dacheng Village, Xianglong Village, Wenhua Village, Shaxi Village, and Yuquan Village (文家市社区，五神村、白溪村、岩前村、新发村、永丰村、双田村、大成村、湘龙村、文华村、沙溪村和玉泉村).

== Education ==
- Wenjiashi Meddle School
- Liuyang No. 11 High School

== Transportation ==
- Provincial Highway S311

== Attractions ==
Former Residence of Yang Yong and the Site of Joining Forces in Wenjiashi of Autumn Harvest Uprising are well-known scenic spots.

== Celebrity ==
- Yang Yong, a general of the People's Liberation Army (PLA).
