= Liuhe =

Liuhe may refer to the following locations in China:

- Liuhe County (柳河县), Jilin
- Liuhe Pagoda (六和塔), a multi-storied Chinese pagoda in southern Hangzhou

== Towns ==
- Liuhe, Hebei (流河镇), in Qing County
- Liuhe, Taicang (浏河镇), Jiangsu

Written as "六合镇":

- Liuhe, Nehe, Heilongjiang
- Liuhe, Inner Mongolia, in Arun Banner

Written as "刘河镇":

- Liuhe, Xingyang, Henan
- Liuhe, Qichun County, in Qichun County, Huanggang, Hubei

Written as "柳河镇":

- Liuhe, Liuhe County, Jilin
- Liuhe, Mulan County, Heilongjiang
- Liuhe, Ningling County, Henan

== Townships ==
- Liuhe Township, Gansu (柳河乡), in Yumen City
- Liuhe Township, Fangcheng County (柳河乡), Henan
- Liuhe Township, Yongcheng (刘河乡), Henan

Written as "六合乡":

- Liuhe Township, Hunan, in Guiyang County
- Liuhe Township, Jiangyou, Sichuan
- Liuhe Township, Yingjing County, Sichuan
- Liuhe Township, Yingshan County, Sichuan
- Liuhe Yi Ethnic Township (六合彝族乡), Heqing County, Yunnan

== Village ==
- Liuhe, a village in Xinghua Township, Hong'an County, Huangang, Hubei

== See also ==
- Liu He (disambiguation)
