= Site of Joining Forces in Wenjiashi of Autumn Harvest Uprising =

Coordinates: 28°02′56″N 113°56′14″E

The Site of Joining Forces in Wenjiashi of Autumn Harvest Uprising (simplified Chinese: 秋收起义文家市会师旧址; traditional Chinese: 秋收起義文家市會師舊址; pinyin: Qiūshōu Qǐyì Wénjiāshì Huìshī Jiùzhǐ) is located in Wenjiashi Town, approximately 51km from Liuyang city, Hunan, China. It contains buildings such as Liren School and the Memorial Museum. It is one of the most popular tourist attractions in Liuyang, Hunan province.

== History ==
Liren School was originally built in 1841, in the region of Daoguang Emperor of the Qing dynasty (1644–1911).

It was officially renamed "Liren School" (里仁学校) in 1912.

On September 9, 1927, the Communist leader Mao Zedong launched the Autumn Harvest Uprising in Hunan-Jiangxi border region. A few days later while he and his army was defeated by the Kuomintang army, they assembled in Wenjiashi, Liuyang of Hunan province. On September 19, 1927, Mao hosted a military conference in here at night, then he and his army marched to Jinggang Mountains and gave up the plan of attacking Changsha.

On 4 March 1961, it was listed as a Major Historical and Cultural Site Protected at the National Level in Hunan province by the State Council of the People's Republic of China.

In 1977, the Liuyang government built a memorial museum here. With an area of about 12474 square meters, the museum holds many historical relics.

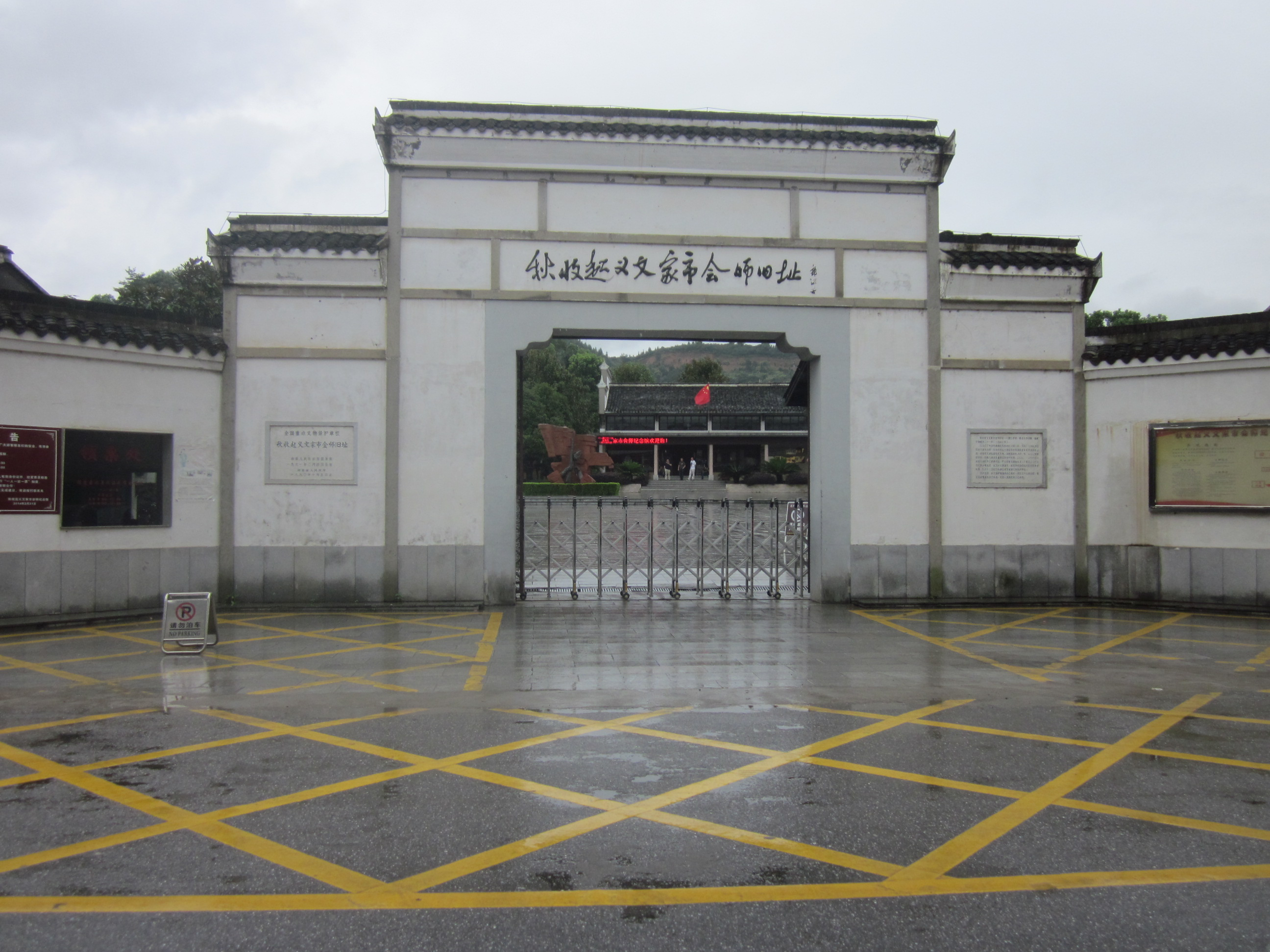
The gate.

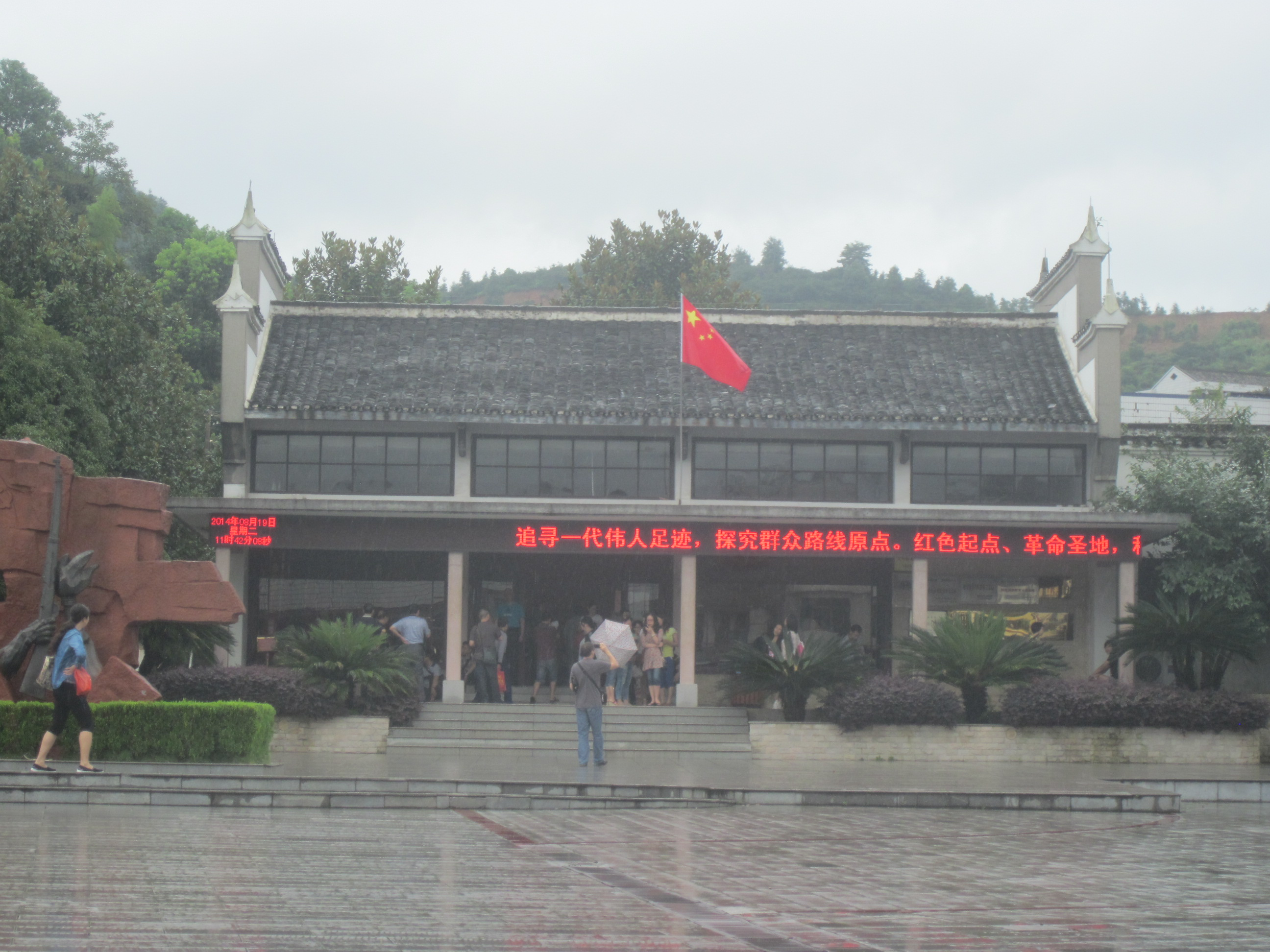
The Memorial Museum

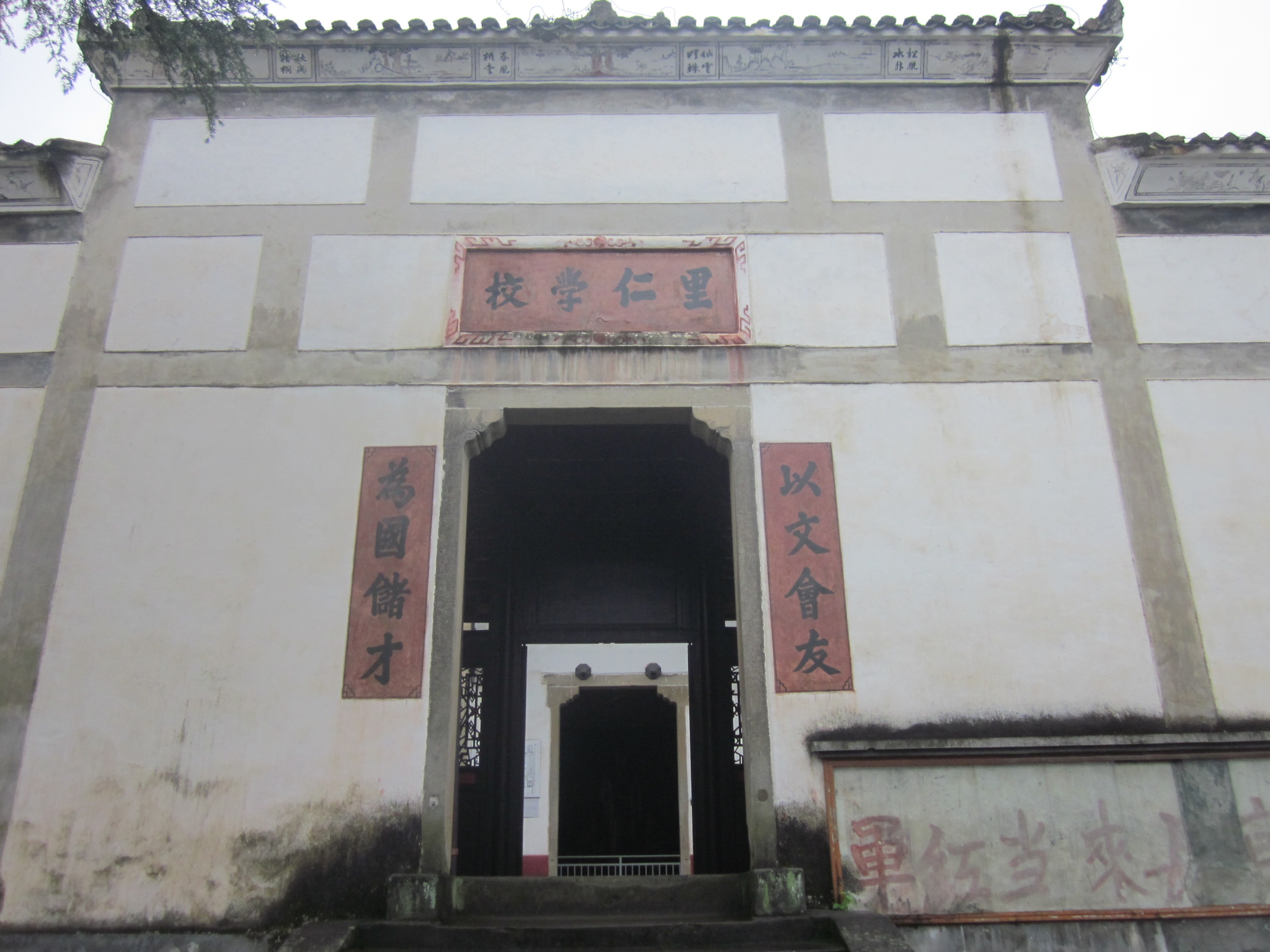
Liren School (里仁学校)

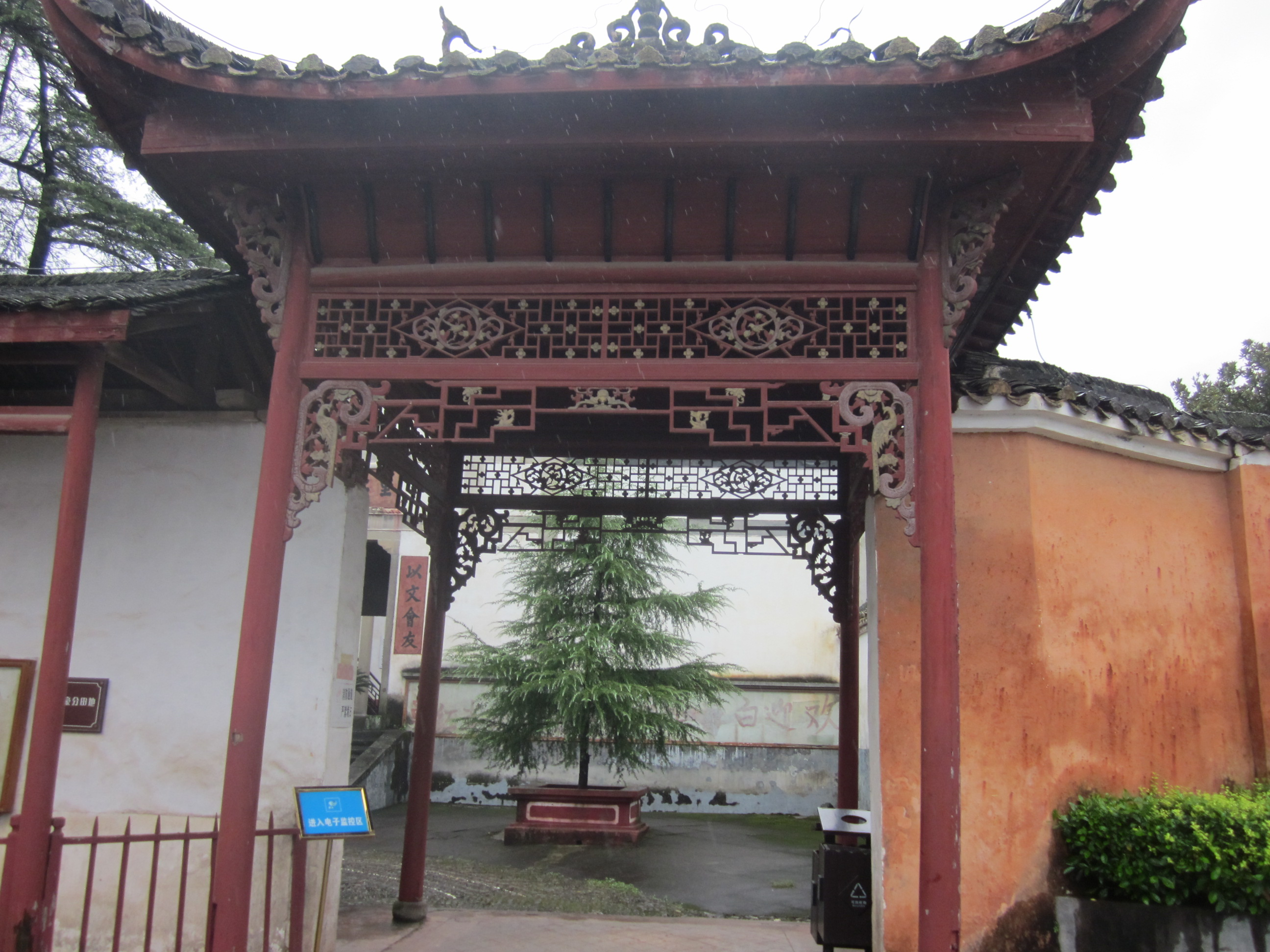
The old building.

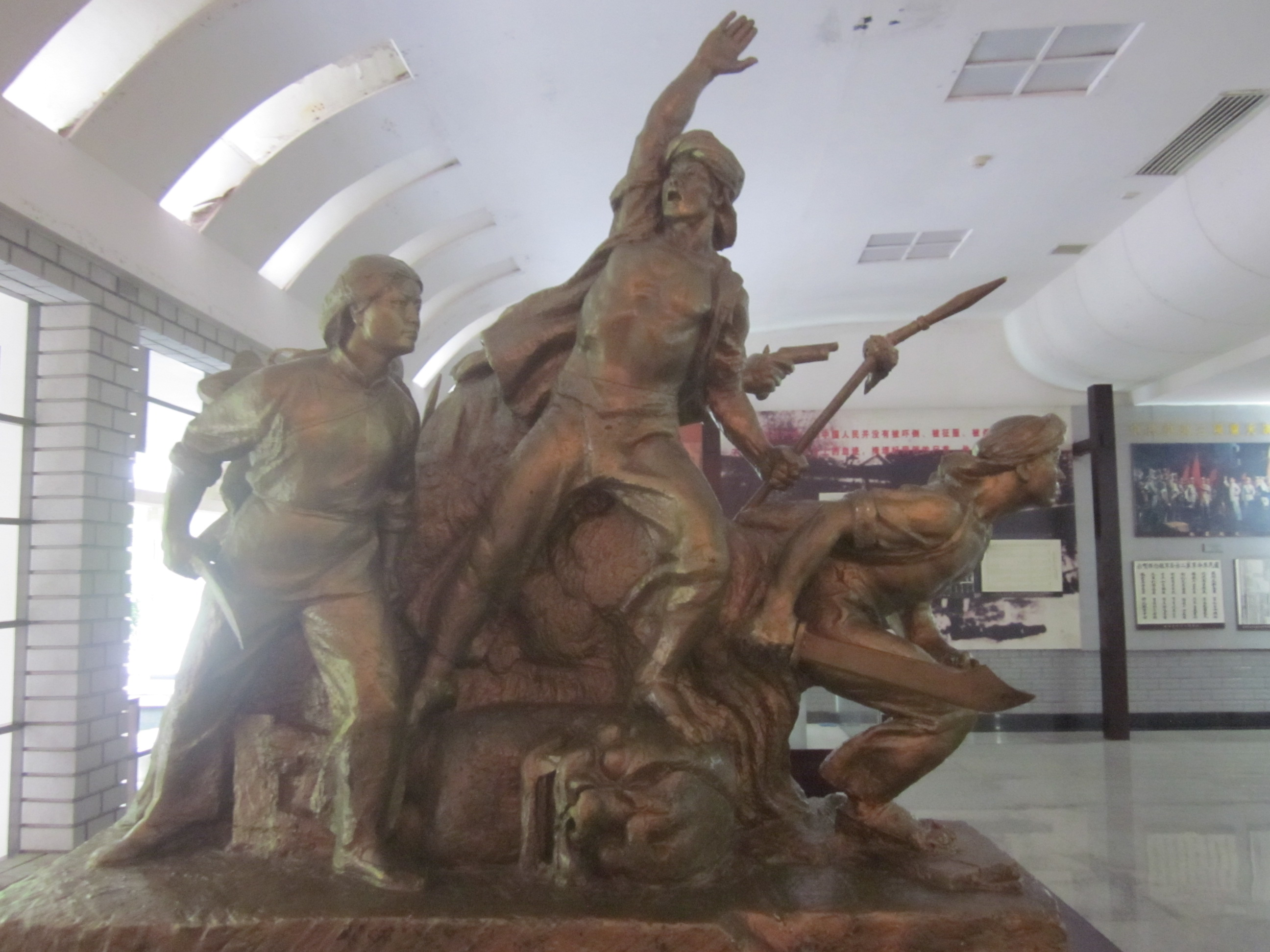
The statue.

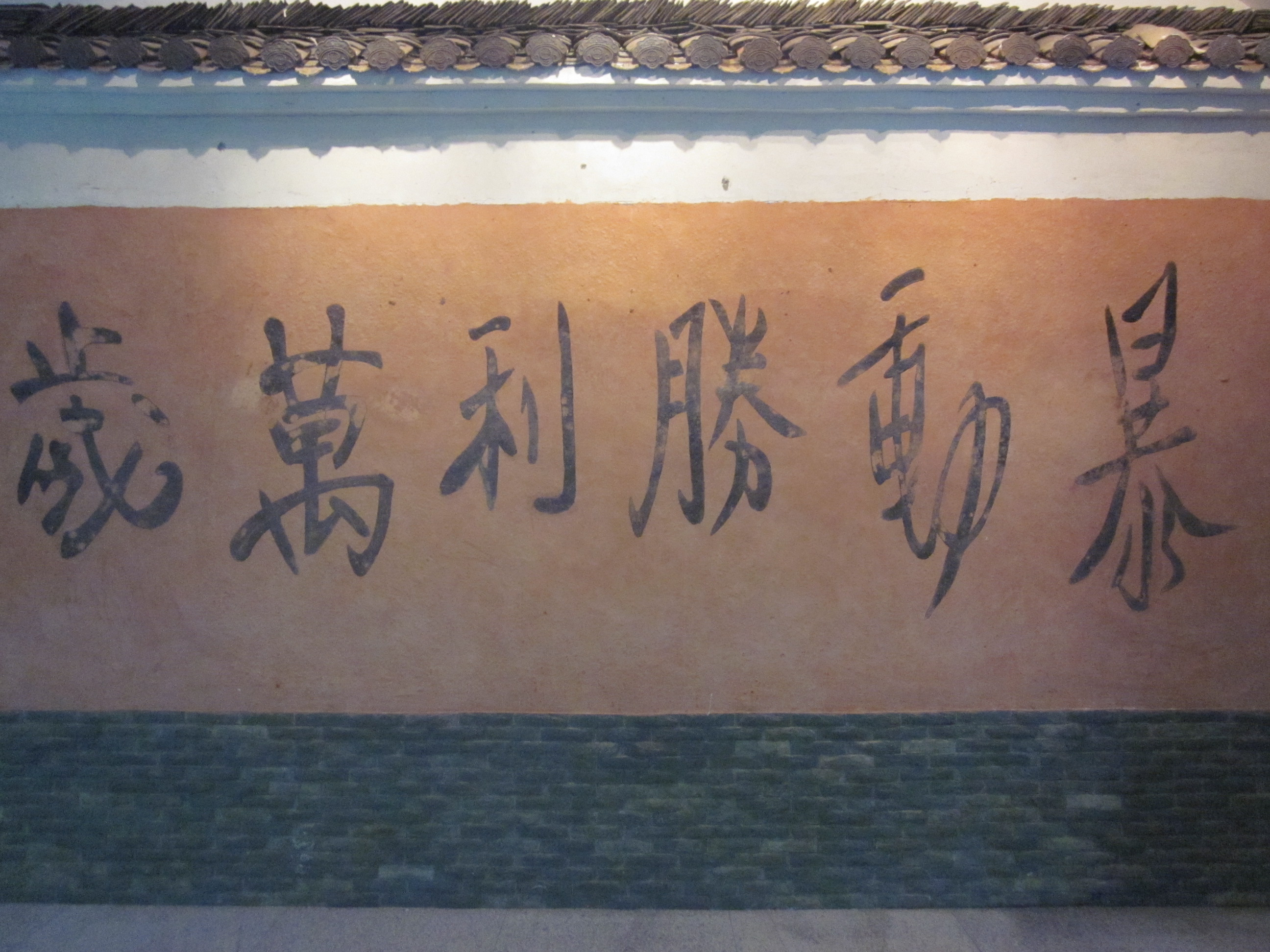
Propaganda slogan: "Long live the rebellion and victory!".

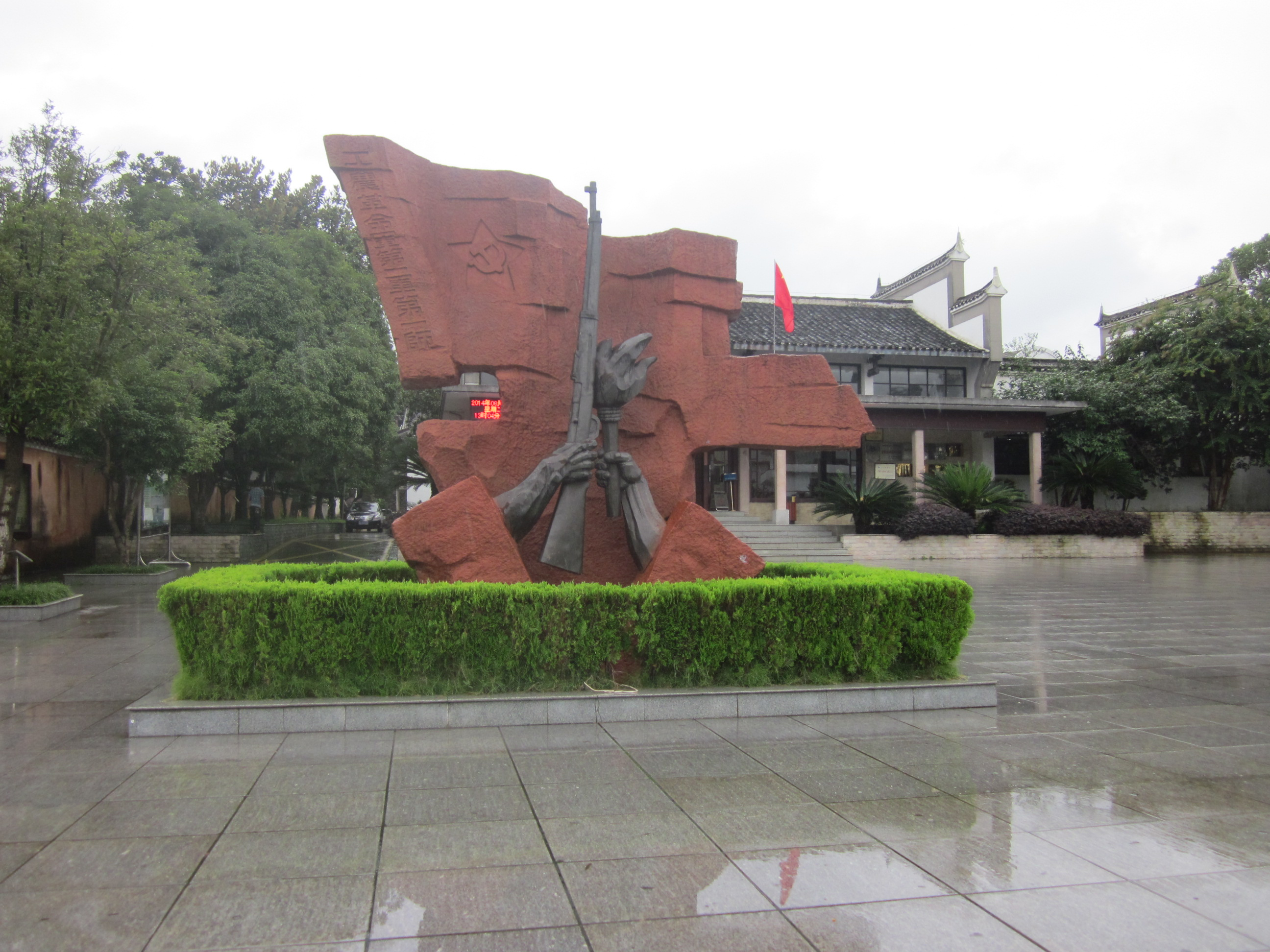
The statue.

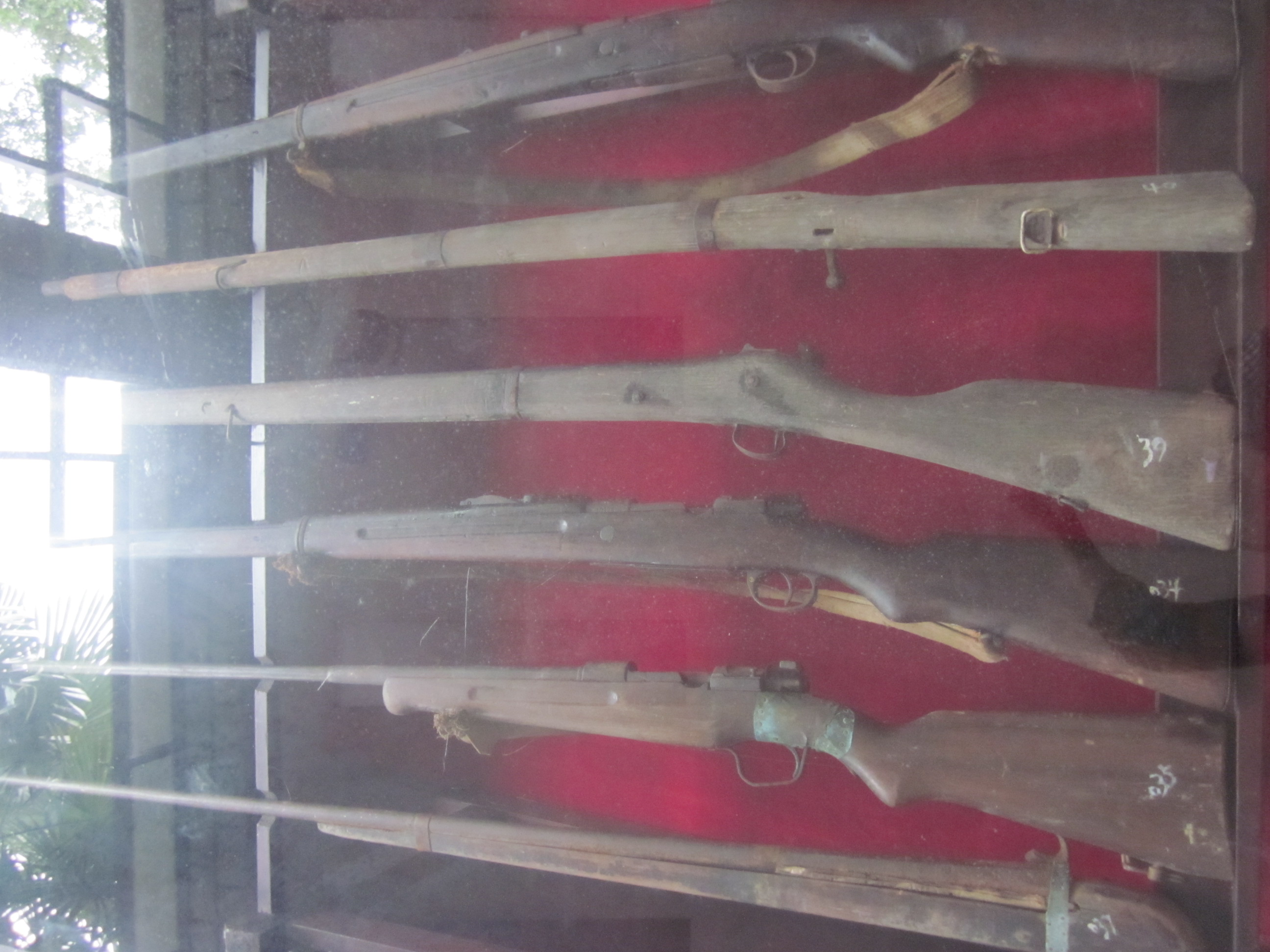
Guns.
