= Liu He =

Liu He may refer to:

- Marquis of Haihun (died 59 BC), personal name Liu He, emperor of the Han dynasty for 27 days in 74 BC
- Liu He (Han-Zhao) (died 310), emperor of the Chinese/Xiongnu state Han Zhao in 310
- Liu He (politician) (born 1952), Vice Premier of China

== See also ==
- Liuhe (disambiguation)
