= Yang Yong (general) =

Chinese general

- 杨勇
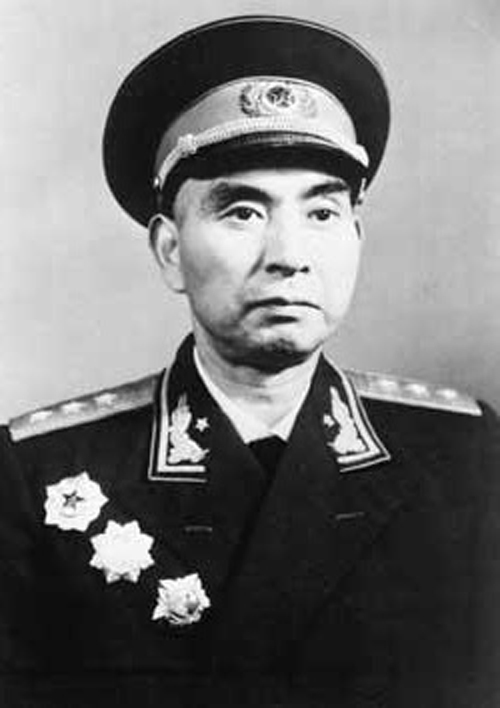
- Yang Yong

Secretary of Secretariat of the Chinese Communist Party
- In office September 1982 – January 1983

Deputy Secretary General of Central Military Commission
- In office January 1980 – January 1983

Deputy Chief of staff of People's Liberation Army General Staff Department
- In office September 1977 – January 1980

Commanding officer of Beijing Military Region
- In office September 1958 – June 1963
- Preceded by: Yang Chengwu
- Succeeded by: Zheng Weishan

Governor of Guizhou
- In office January 1950 – April 1951
- Preceded by: Ku Cheng-lun
- Succeeded by: Zhou Lin

Personal details
- Born: October 28, 1913 Liuyang, Hunan, China
- Died: January 6, 1983 (aged 69) Beijing, China
- Party: Chinese Communist Party
- Children: 3
- Education: PLA National Defence University
- Awards: Order of Bayi; Order of Independence and Freedom; Order of Liberation

Military service
- Allegiance: People's Republic of China
- Branch/service: People's Liberation Army
- Years of service: 1927-1983
- Rank: General
- Commands: Commanding officer
- Battles/wars: Second Sino-Japanese War; Chinese Civil War

Chinese name
- Traditional Chinese: 楊勇
- Simplified Chinese: 杨勇
Transcriptions
Standard Mandarin
- Hanyu Pinyin: Yáng Yǒng

Yang Yong (Chinese: 杨勇; 28 October 1913 – 6 January 1983) was a general in the People's Liberation Army of China. He served as the secretary of the Secretariat of the Chinese Communist Party between September 1982 and January 1983, and governor of Guizhou, from January 1950 to April 1951.

== Life ==
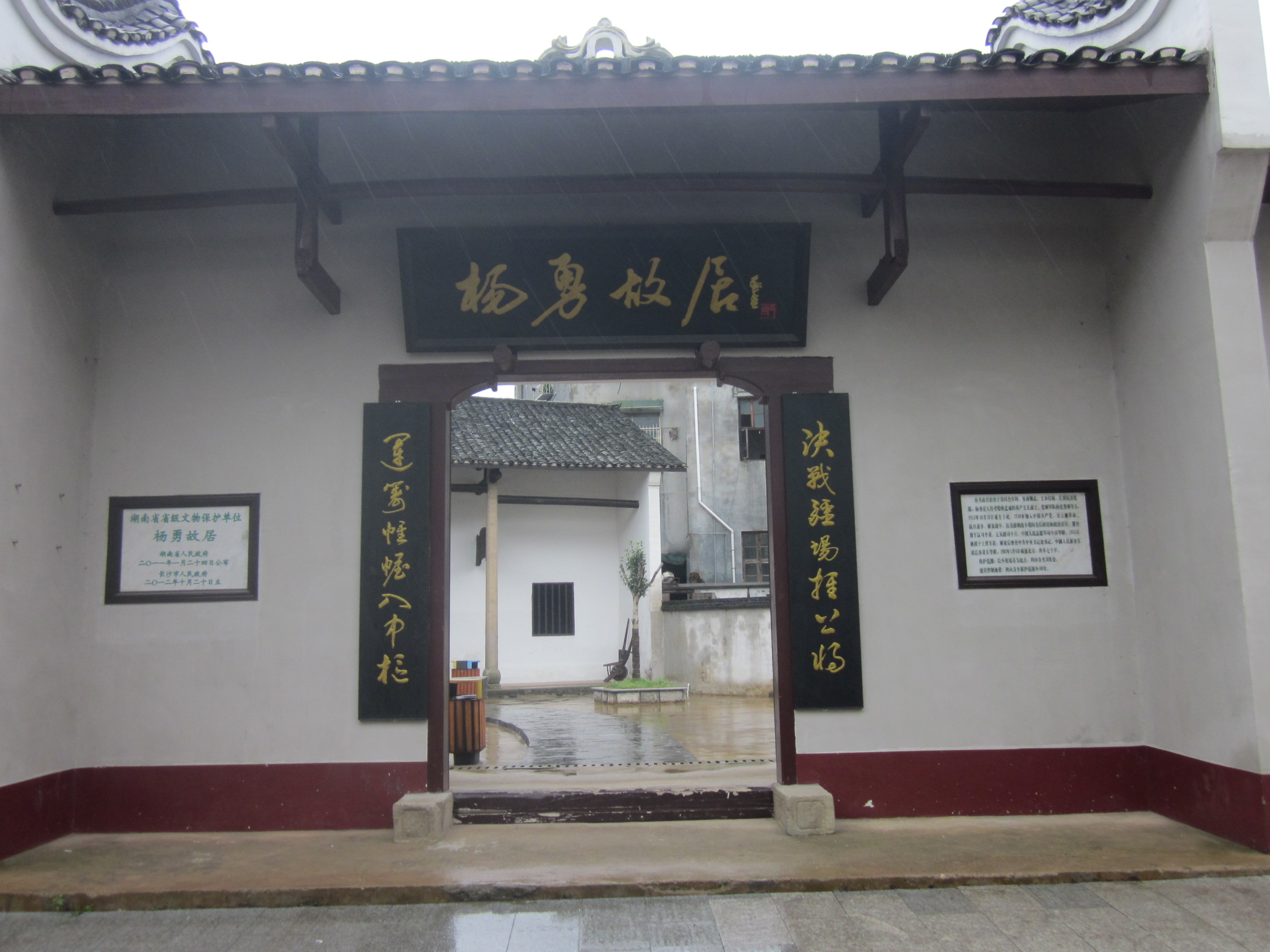
The Former Residence of Yang Yong.

Yang Yong was born Yang Shijun (Chinese: 杨世峻/楊世峻) in Wenjiashi Town of Liuyang, Hunan province, Republic of China.

In 1926, Yang joined the Young Pioneers of China and served as the captain. In April 1927, he joined the Communist Youth League of China. After the Mari Incident (马日事变; 馬日事變), he took part in the Long March.

In February 1930, Yang joined the Chinese Communist Party and Chinese Workers' and Peasants' Red Army, at that time, he took part in the Fifth Encirclement Campaign against Jiangxi Soviet.

During the Second Sino-Japanese War, he wounded in the Battle of Pingxingguan.

In May 1940, Yang served as the commanding officer of the West of Shandong Military Region.

In 1945, Yang took part in the Handan Campaign, then Longhai Campaign, Dingtao Campaign, and Huai County Campaign.

In July 1947, Yang took part in the West of Henan Campaign, Yuncheng Campaign. One year later, he took part in the Huaihai Campaign. After 1949, he commanded the 5th Army (including the 17th and 18th Corps) of the Second Field Army.

After the founding of PRC, Yang served as the Governor of Guizhou and commanding officer of Guizhou Military Region.

At the end of 1950, Yang entered the PLA National Defence University and served as the director.

In April 1953, Yang went to North Korea to assist in the Korean War.

On September 27, 1955, he was made a full general of PLA.

In October 1958, he was appointed as commanding officer of Beijing Military Region.

In 1966, Mao Zedong launched the Cultural Revolution, he suffered political persecution and experienced mistreatment; he was rehabilitated in 1972.

In 1972, he served as the deputy commanding officer of Shenyang Military Region, then he was transferred to Xinjiang.

In August 1973, Yang was elected as a member of Central Committee of the Chinese Communist Party, and was re-elected in August 1977.

In August 1975, Yang served as the commanding officer of Xinjiang Military Region.

In September 1977, Yang was transferred to Beijing as the Deputy Chief of Staff of People's Liberation Army General Staff Department and a member of Central Military Commission.

In February 1978, Yang was elected as a member of Standing Committee of the National People's Congress.

In January 1980, Yang served as the deputy secretary general of Central Military Commission.

In September 1982, Yang was elected as a member of Central Committee of the Chinese Communist Party and secretary of Secretariat of the Chinese Communist Party.

On January 6, 1983, Yang died of illness in Beijing, aged 70.

== See also ==
- Former Residence of Yang Yong

Government offices
Preceded by Gu Zhenglun	Governor of Guizhou; 1950–1951	Succeeded by Zhou Lin
Military offices
Preceded by Yang Chengwu	Commanding officer of Beijing Military Region; 1958–1963	Succeeded by Zheng Weishan
