= Former Residence of Yang Yong =

Coordinates: 28.049951°N 113.937877°E

Former Residence of Yang Yong or Yang Yong's Former Residence (simplified Chinese: 杨勇故居; traditional Chinese: 楊勇故居; pinyin: Yáng Yǒng Gùjū) was built in the late Qing Dynasty in 1873, it is located in Wenjiashi Town of Liuyang, Hunan, China. It has an area of about 1,500 square metres (16,000 sq ft) and a building area of about 500 square metres (5,400 sq ft).

== History ==
In 1913, Yang Yong was born in here.

In 2004, it was listed as a "Major Historical and Cultural Site Protected at the County Level".

In 2011, it was listed as a "Historical and Cultural Sites Protected at the Provincial Level".

== Gallery ==
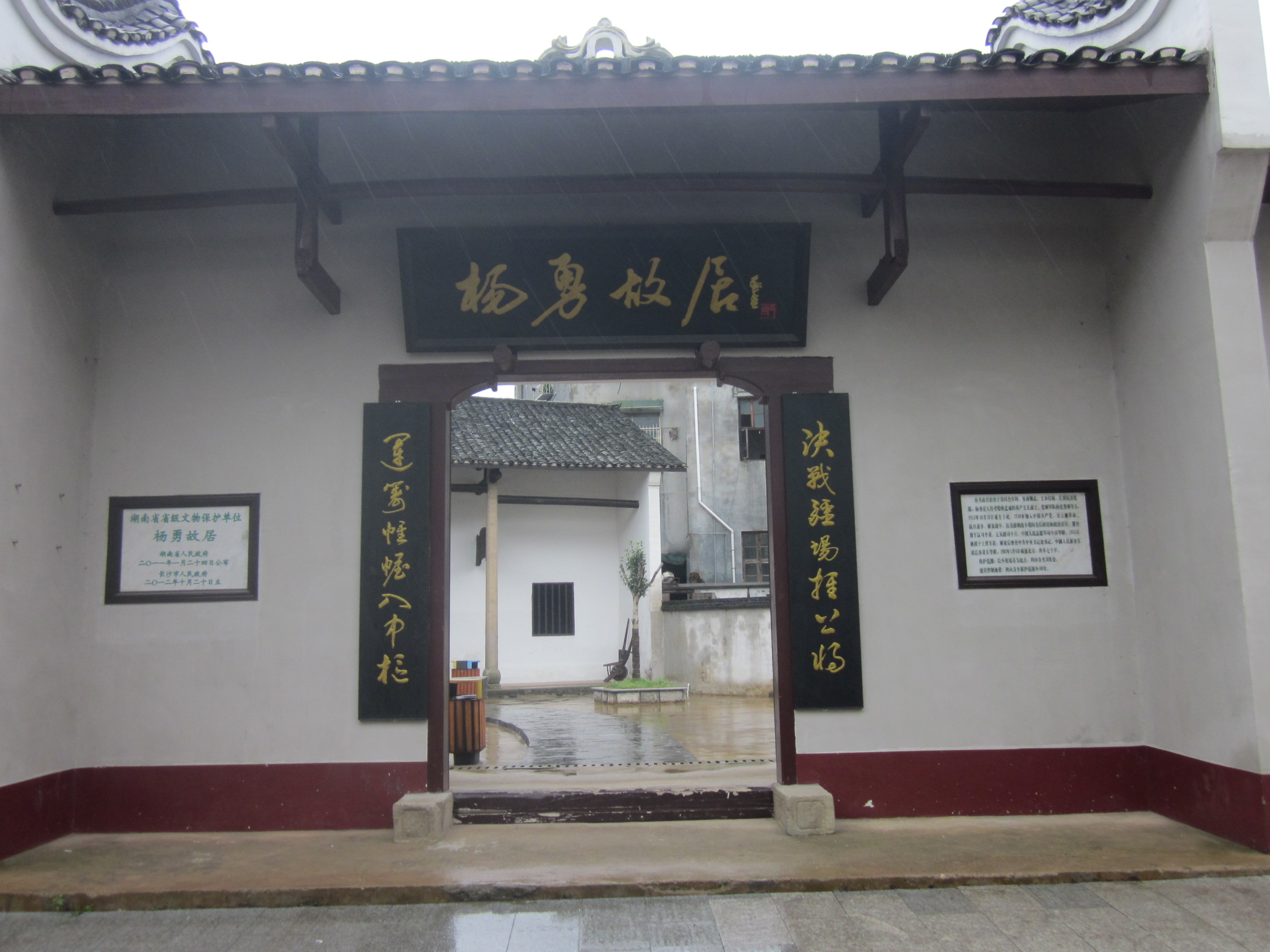

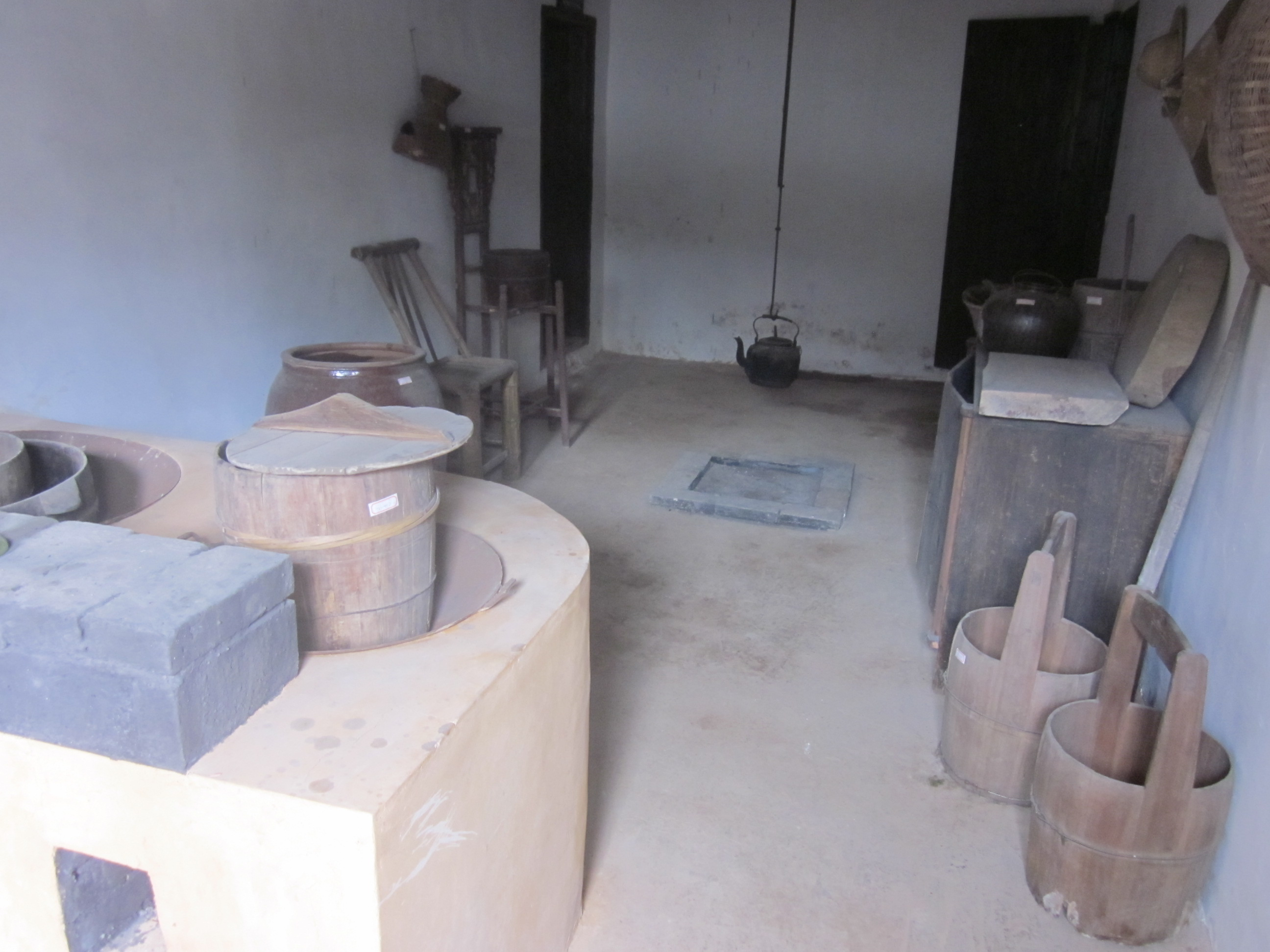
Kitchen

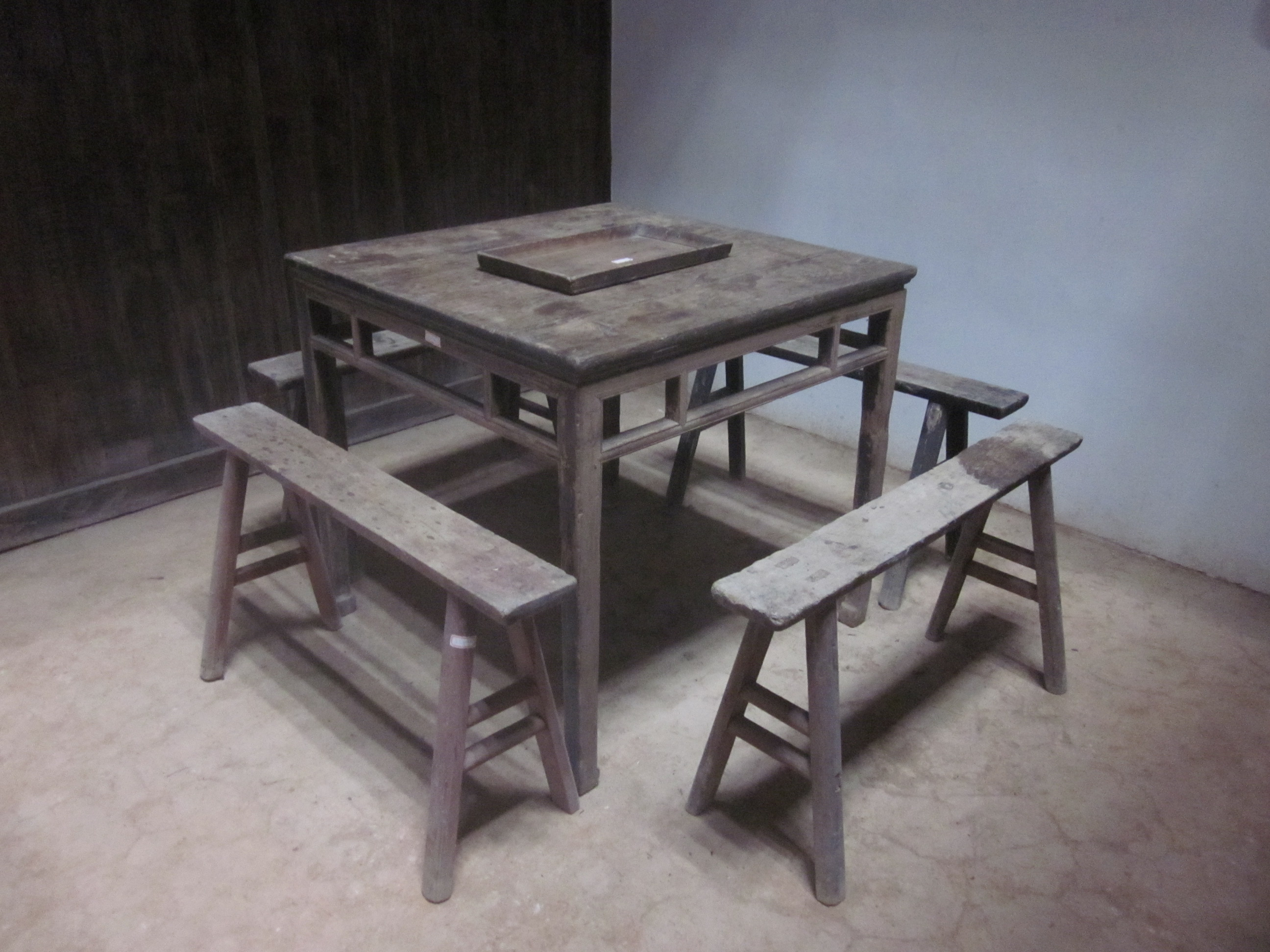
Dining table

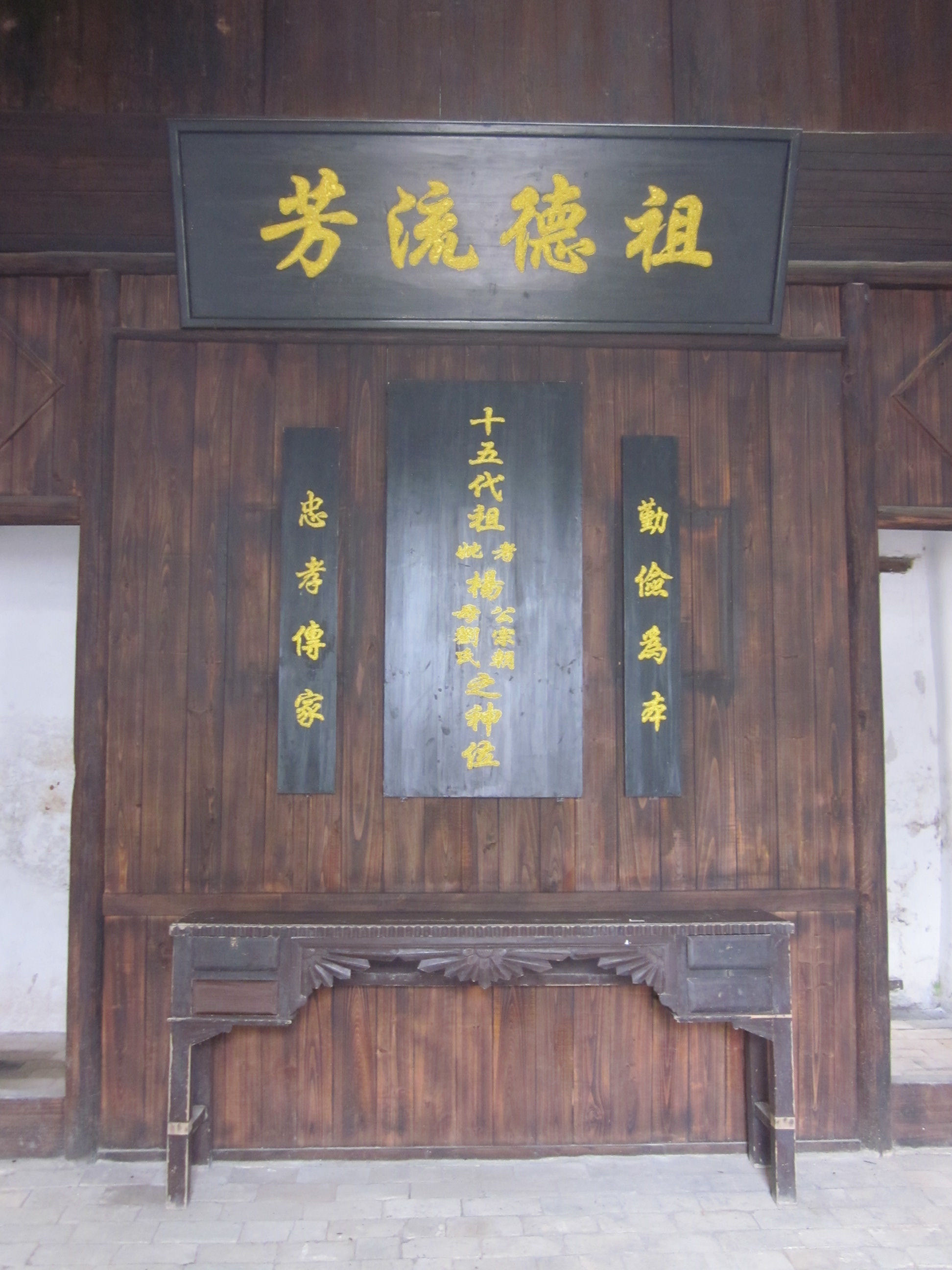
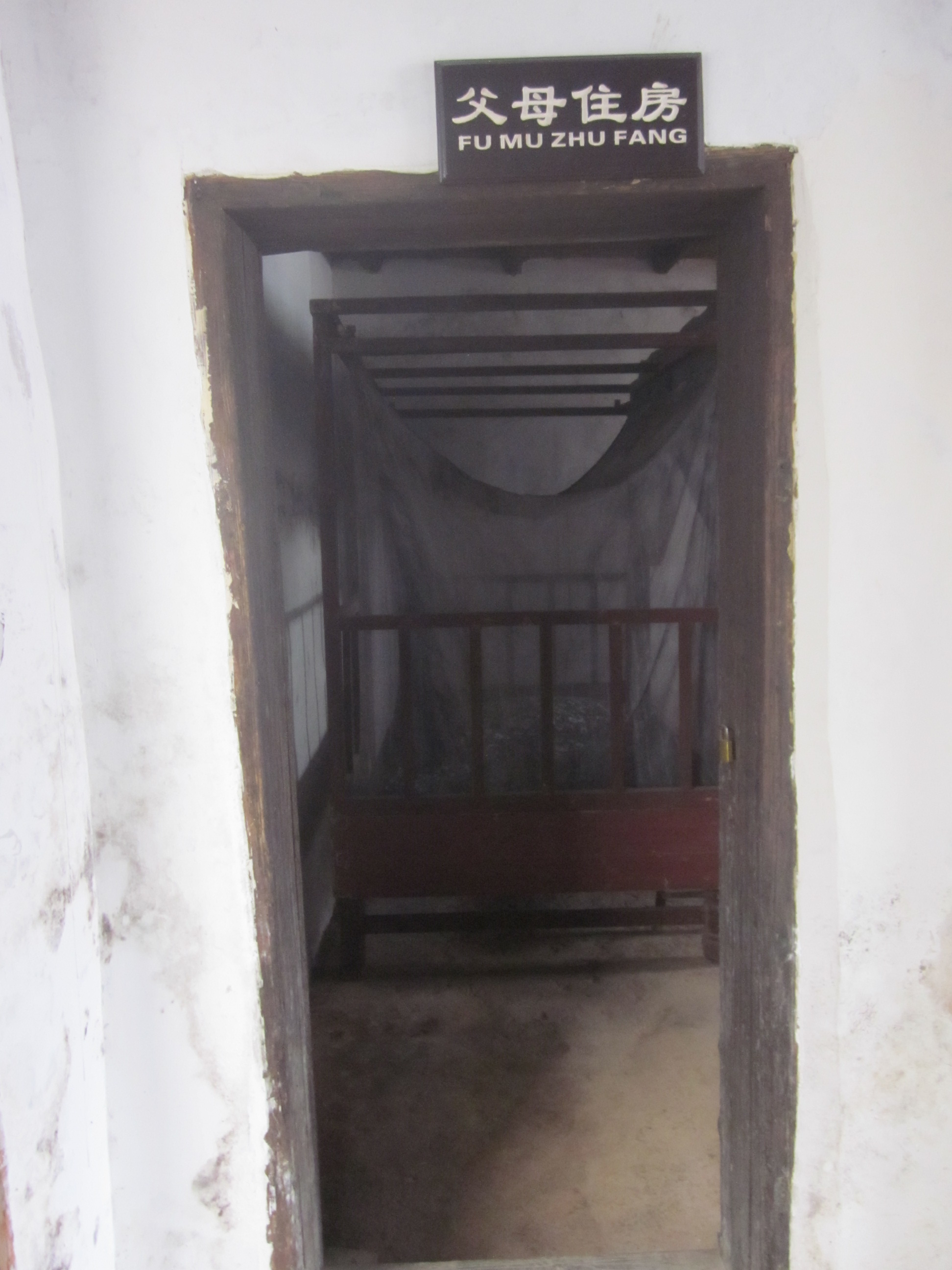
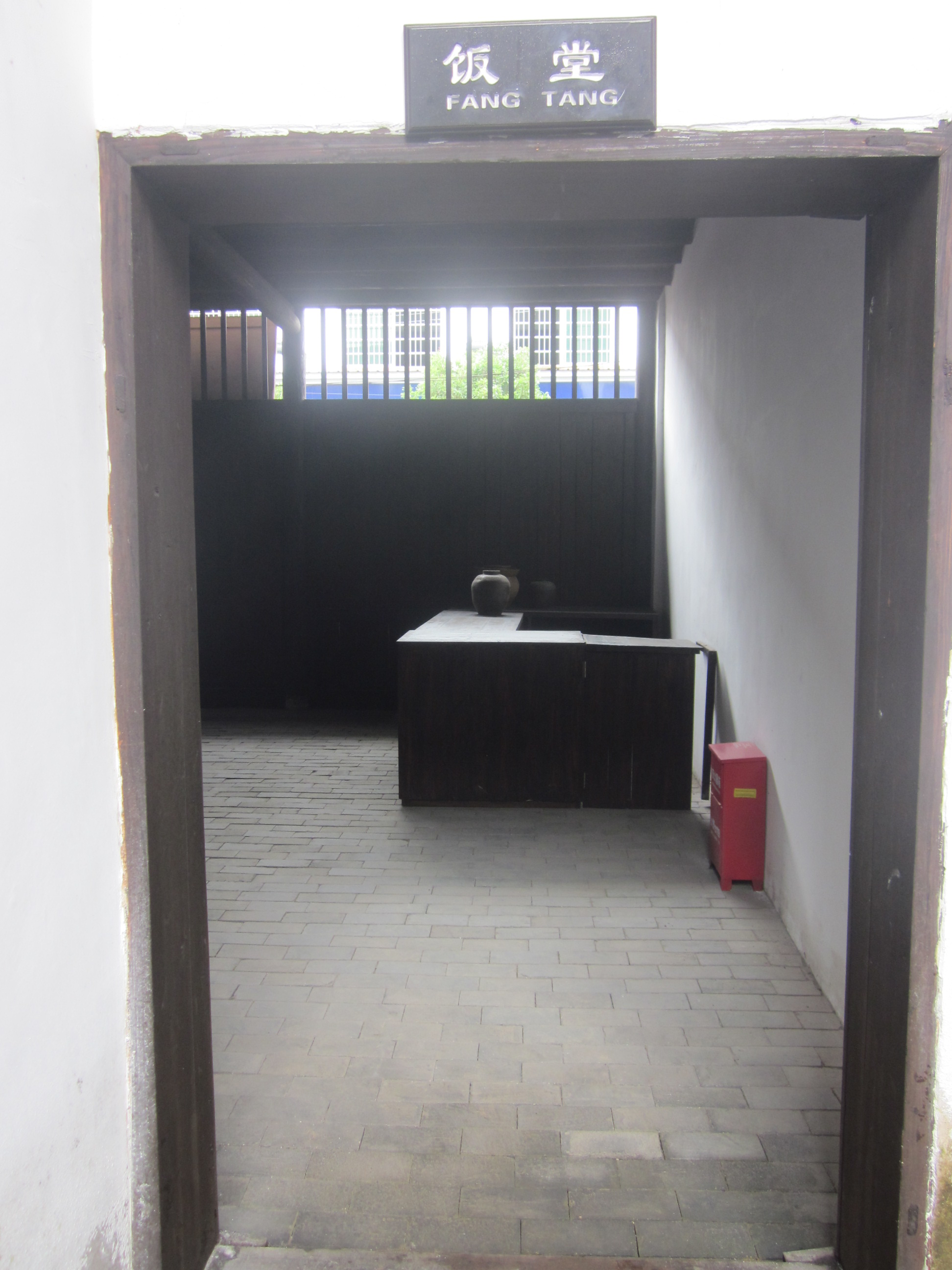
