= Jianjialong =

Jianjialong 简家陇镇
- Town
- Location in Hunan
- Coordinates: 27°06′15″N 111°48′56″E
- Country: China
- Province: Hunan
- Prefecture-level city: Shaoyang
- County-level city: Shaodong

Area
  - Total: 130.38 km^{2} (50.34 sq mi)

Population (2017)
  - Total: 40,337
  - Density: 309.38/km^{2} (801.29/sq mi)
- Time zone: UTC+08:00 (China Standard)
- Postal code: 422821
- Area code: 0739

Chinese name
- Traditional Chinese: 簡家隴鎮
- Simplified Chinese: 简家陇镇
Transcriptions
Standard Mandarin
- Hanyu Pinyin: Jiǎnjiālǒng Zhèn

Jianjialong (Chinese: 简家陇镇) is a town in Shaodong, Hunan, China. As of the 2017 census it had a population of 40,337 and an area of 130.38 square kilometres (50.34 sq mi). The town is bordered to the north by Huochangping Town, to the east by Yejiping Town, to the south by Qidong County, and to the west by Shuangfeng Township.

== History ==
On November 5, 2014, Jianjialong Township was upgraded to a town.

== Administrative divisions ==
As of 2017, the town is divided into fifty villages.

== Economy ==
The main cash crop is Chinese herbal medicine. The main crops are rice, citrus and watermelon.

== Education ==
There are two middle schools, ten primary schools and three kindergartens in the town.

== Tourism ==
Chengzhi House (承志堂) is a famous scenic spot in Shaoyang. It was built in 1812 during the Jiaqing period of the Qing dynasty (1644–1911).
