= Shuangfeng =

Shuangfeng may refer to:

- Shuangfeng County, of Loudi, Hunan
- Shuangfeng dialect, dialect of Xiang Chinese, spoken in Shuangfeng County

Subdistricts

- Shuangfeng Subdistrict, Beijing, in Shunyi District. See List of township-level divisions of Beijing.
- Shuangfeng Subdistrict, Harbin, in Acheng District, Harbin, Heilongjiang. See List of township-level divisions of Heilongjiang

Towns

- Shuangfeng, Taicang, in Taicang, Jiangsu. See List of township-level divisions of Jiangsu
- Shuangfeng, Tieli, in Tieli, Heilongjiang. See List of township-level divisions of Heilongjiang

Townships

- Shuangfeng, Shaodong (双凤乡), a township of Shaodong County, Hunan province
