= Xianzhaqiao =

Xianzhaqiao 仙槎桥镇
- Town
- Location in Hunan
- Coordinates: 27°09′51″N 111°42′21″E
- Country: China
- Province: Hunan
- Prefecture-level city: Shaoyang
- County-level city: Shaodong

Area
  - Total: 74 km^{2} (29 sq mi)

Population (2017)
  - Total: 37,168
  - Density: 500/km^{2} (1,300/sq mi)
- Time zone: UTC+08:00 (China Standard)
- Postal code: 422804
- Area code: 0739

Chinese name
- Traditional Chinese: 仙槎橋鎮
- Simplified Chinese: 仙槎桥镇
Transcriptions
Standard Mandarin
- Hanyu Pinyin: Xiānzhàqiáo Zhèn

Xianzhaqiao (Chinese: 仙槎桥镇) is a town in Shaodong, Hunan, China. As of the 2017 census it had a population of 37,168 and an area of 74-square-kilometre (29 sq mi). It is surrounded by Weijiaqiao Town on the south, Jiulongling Town on the west, and Shuangfeng Township on the east.

== History ==
In 1956 it was incorporated as a township. In 1965 it was renamed "Xianzhaqiao People's Commune". In 1984 it was upgraded to a town.

== Administrative division ==
As of 2017, the town is divided into forty-five villages and one community.

== Geography ==
The Zi River flows through the town.

== Education ==
- Xianzhaqiao Central Middle School (仙槎桥镇中心中学)
- Xianzhaqiao Lingshansi Middle School (仙槎桥灵山寺中学)

== Economy ==
The economy is supported primarily by hardwares.

== Transport ==
The S90 Hengyang-Shaoyang Expressway is an east–west highway in the town.

The County Road X019 passes across the town north to south.
