= Baomianqian Township =

Baomianqian Township 堡面前乡
- Township
- Location in Hunan
- Coordinates: 27°02′35″N 112°00′48″E
- Country: China
- Province: Hunan
- Prefecture-level city: Shaoyang
- County-level city: Shaodong

Area
  - Total: 55.08 km^{2} (21.27 sq mi)

Population (2017)
  - Total: 11,756
  - Density: 213.4/km^{2} (552.8/sq mi)
- Time zone: UTC+08:00 (China Standard)
- Postal code: 422831
- Area code: 0739

Chinese name
- Traditional Chinese: 堡面前鄉
- Simplified Chinese: 堡面前乡
Transcriptions
Standard Mandarin
- Hanyu Pinyin: Bǎomiànqián Xiāng

Baomianqian Township (Chinese: 堡面前乡) is a township in Shaodong, Hunan, China. The population was 11,756 at the 2017 census.

== History ==
It was known as Anhe Township (安和乡) in 1950. In 1956 its named was changed to "Baomianqian Township". In 1961 it was renamed "Baomianqian People's Commune". In 1984 it was restored as a township.

== Administrative division ==
As of 2015, the township is divided into nineteen villages:

- Shamuyuan (杉木源村)
- Dayang (大羊村)
- Hongjing (红旌村)
- Huajia (花甲村)
- Aizhu (蔼竹村)
- Xinyuan (新源村)
- Wuyi (五一村)
- Jinshi (金石村)
- Xinhua (新华村)
- Chayun (茶云村)
- Bayi (八一村)
- Baomianqian (堡面前村)
- Dayun (大云村)
- Leiwan (雷湾村)
- Hengjiachong (横江冲村)
- Shuanglian (双联村)
- Shengli (胜利村)
- Yonggui (永桂村)
- Caoyuanchong (槽源冲村)

== Geography ==
The highest point in the township is Mount Dayun (大云山; 'Mount of Big Cloud'), also known as "Mount Daniu" (大牛山; 'Mount of Big Cattle'), "Mount Yejiang" (耶姜山) or "White Clouds Peak" (白云峰), which is at 996.4 metres (3,269 ft) above sea level.

== Economy ==
Baomianqian Township's economy is based on nearby mineral resources and agricultural resources. Sweet potato and wheat are the main food crops. Chinese herbal medicine is the main economic crop. It is rich in iron, aluminum, gold, copper, uranium, manganese, phosphorus and granite.

== Notable people ==
- Shen Taizhi (申太之), Tang dynasty politician.
- Luo Zongzhi (罗宗之), Southern Song dynasty politician.
- Zou Tongshu (邹统书), Ming dynasty scholar.
- Liu Dapeng (刘大鹏), revolutionist.
- Liu Shutao (刘树涛), politician in the Republic of China.
- Liu Zhongji (刘中冀), politician.
- Liu Shuiyu (刘水玉), journalist of Xinhua News Agency.
