= Zhuocao Township =

Zhuocao Township 斫𥕢乡
- Township
- Location in Hunan
- Coordinates: 27°26′18″N 111°52′39″E
- Country: China
- Province: Hunan
- Prefecture-level city: Shaoyang
- County-level city: Shaodong

Area
  - Total: 47.74 km^{2} (18.43 sq mi)

Population (2017)
  - Total: 18,949
  - Density: 396.9/km^{2} (1,028/sq mi)
- Time zone: UTC+08:00 (China Standard)
- Postal code: 422811
- Area code: 0739

Chinese name
- Traditional Chinese: 斫𥕢鄉
- Simplified Chinese: 斫𥕢乡
Transcriptions
Standard Mandarin
- Hanyu Pinyin: Zhuócáo Xiāng

Zhuocao Township (Chinese: 斫𥕢乡) is a township in Shaodong, Hunan, China. As of the 2017 census it had a population of 18,949 and an area of 47.74-square-kilometre (18.43 sq mi). It is known for Chinese herbal medicine and has been hailed as "Medicine town in central Hunan" (湘中药乡).

== History ==
In 1950 it belonged to Lianqiao District (廉桥区). It was renamed "Zhuocao People's Commune" in 1958. It was incorporated as a township in 1984.

== Administrative division ==
As of 2017, the township is divided into twenty-nine villages:

- Shangzhuo (上斫村)
- Shiping (石坪村)
- Xinpu (新铺村)
- Yaojia (姚家村)
- Luofu (罗富村)
- Shizi (十字村)
- Xinkui (新奎村)
- Shaping (砂坪村)
- Tanshu (檀树村)
- Zishan (梓山村)
- Ma'antang (马鞍塘村)
- Huangni'ao (黄泥坳村)
- Yanquan (岩泉村)
- Mukouba (木口坝村)
- Hetangping (和塘坪村)
- Ditang (堤塘村)
- Wanfu (万福村)
- Hutiantang (胡田塘村)
- Chongshan (崇山村)
- Ouping (欧坪村)
- Lijia (李家村)
- Yejiping (野鸡坪村)
- Tangjialing (唐家岭村)
- Longtan (龙潭村)
- Changliu (长流村)
- Caidaping (蔡大坪村)
- Zaitang (栽棠村)
- Yuanjia (袁家村)
- Wutong (梧桐村)

== Geography ==
The highest point in the township is Zhupo Mountain (猪婆大山) which stands 681 metres (2,234 ft) above sea level.

Luoshuiyan Reservoir (落水岩水库) is a reservoir in the township. The lake provides drinking water and water for irrigation.

== Economy ==
The local economy is primarily based upon Chinese herbal medicine and fruits.

== Attractions ==
Three public parks are located in the township: Yanquan Park (岩泉公园), Liu'an Park (柳岸公园) and Xiashan Park (峡山公园).
