= Liangshitang Subdistrict =

Liangshitang Subdistrict 两市塘街道
- Subdistrict
- Location in Hunan
- Coordinates: 27°14′30″N 111°44′23″E
- Country: China
- Province: Hunan
- Prefecture-level city: Shaoyang
- County-level city: Shaodong

Area
  - Total: 36.9 km^{2} (14.2 sq mi)

Population (2015)
  - Total: 87,200
  - Density: 2,360/km^{2} (6,120/sq mi)
- Time zone: UTC+08:00 (China Standard)
- Postal code: 422000
- Area code: 0739

Liangshitang Subdistrict (Chinese: 两市塘街道; pinyin: Liǎngshìtáng Jiēdào) is a subdistrict in Shaodong, Hunan, China. As of the 2015 census it had a population of 87,200 and an area of 36.9-square-kilometre (14.2 sq mi).

== Administrative division ==
As of 2017, the subdistrict is divided into nineteen villages and five communities:

- Wenhualu Community (文化路社区)
- Hepingjie Community (和平街社区)
- Chengnan Community (城南社区)
- Gangnanlu Community (港南路社区)
- Shenglijie Community (胜利街社区)
- Yingshan (应山村)
- Gaotian (高田村)
- Datang (大塘村)
- Gulin (古林村)
- Qinglan (青兰村)
- Luanxing (峦兴村)
- Lianyun (联云村)
- Dalian (大联村)
- Shiqiantou (石桥头村)
- Xinshang (新上村)
- Xinxing (新兴村)
- Xinglong (兴隆村)
- Yunshan (云山村)
- Shuanghe (双河村)
- Hexing (合兴村)
- Yongxingqiao (永兴桥村)
- Minwang (民旺村)
- Xinwu (新屋村)
- Jiujiang (九江村)
