= Huochangping =

Huochangping 火厂坪镇
- Town
- Location in Hunan
- Coordinates: 27°10′42″N 111°53′43″E
- Country: China
- Province: Hunan
- Prefecture-level city: Shaoyang
- County-level city: Shaodong

Area
  - Total: 97 km^{2} (37 sq mi)

Population (2017)
  - Total: 44,522
  - Density: 460/km^{2} (1,200/sq mi)
- Time zone: UTC+08:00 (China Standard)
- Postal code: 410818
- Area code: 0739

Chinese name
- Traditional Chinese: 火厂坪镇
- Simplified Chinese: 火廠坪鎮
Transcriptions
Standard Mandarin
- Hanyu Pinyin: Huǒchǎngpíng Zhèn

Huochangping (Chinese: 火厂坪镇) is a town in Shaodong, Hunan, China. As of the 2017 census it had a population of 44,522 and an area of 97 square kilometres (37 sq mi). The town is bordered to the north by the towns of Shashi and Liuguangling, to the east by the towns of Yangqiao and Shetianqiao, to the south by the towns of Yejiping and Jianjialong, and to the west by Xiancha Town and Zhouguanqiao Township.

== History ==
After the establishment of the Communist State in 1949, it belonged to the 12th District of Shaoyang County. It came under the jurisdiction of Shaodong County in February 1952. In 1955 it was known as "Huochangping District". In 1958 it was renamed "Huochangping People's Commune". It was restored as a township in 1984. In 1995 Longgongqiao Township (龙公桥乡) was merged into the town.

== Administrative divisions ==
As of 2017, the town is divided into 50 villages and one community.

== Geography ==
Tongjiang River (桐江河) flows through the town east to west.

The town enjoys a subtropical humid monsoon climate, enjoying four distinct seasons and abundant precipitation.

== Economy ==
The town's main industries are agriculture, mining and shoe-making industry.

== Notable people ==
- Zhao Xuegui (赵学圭), revolutionist.
- Zhao Qinfang (赵芹芳), revolutionist.
- Zhao Xucheng (赵旭程), revolutionist.
- Long Chuan (龙川), revolutionist.
- He Yiqun (何益群), revolutionist.
- Wang Xianzhang (王宪章), revolutionist.
- Zhao Dongchu (赵冬初), professor.
- Zhao Huaping (赵华屏), professor.
- Zhao Chunwu (赵春吾), professor.
