= Songjiatang Subdistrict =

Songjiatang Subdistrict 宋家塘街道
- Subdistrict
- Location in Hunan
- Coordinates: 27°15′40″N 111°44′03″E
- Country: China
- Province: Hunan
- Prefecture-level city: Shaoyang
- County-level city: Shaodong

Area
  - Total: 30 km^{2} (12 sq mi)

Population (2015)
  - Total: 70,400
  - Density: 2,300/km^{2} (6,100/sq mi)
- Time zone: UTC+08:00 (China Standard)
- Postal code: 422000
- Area code: 0739

Songjiatang Subdistrict (Chinese: 宋家塘街道; pinyin: Sòngjiātáng Jiēdào) is a subdistrict in Shaodong, Hunan, China. As of the 2017 census it had a population of 70,400 and an area of 30-square-kilometre (12 sq mi).

== History ==
It was upgraded to a subdistrict in April 2011.

== Administrative division ==
As of 2017, the subdistrict is divided into five communities and fifteen villages:

- Hehua (荷花社区)
- Gongyuanlu (公园路社区)
- Guangchang (广场社区)
- Xinhui (新辉社区)
- Xinputai (新铺台社区)
- Paotang (泡塘村)
- Maizikou (麦子口村)
- Qiutian (丘田村)
- Tantang (坦塘村)
- Liuqiao (刘桥村)
- Qinglongguan (青龙观村)
- Songjiatang (宋家塘村)
- Jinquan (金泉村)
- Ruantang (软塘村)
- Saitian (赛田村)
- Hutang (湖塘村)
- Tanshanpu (檀山铺村)
- Zhimu (桎木村)
- Gaotang (高塘村)
- Fenshui'ao (分水坳村)

== Transport ==
Shaodong railway station serves the subdistrict.
