= Zhouguanqiao Township =

Zhouguanqiao Township 周官桥乡
- Township
- Location in Hunan
- Coordinates: 27°13′10″N 111°49′05″E
- Country: People's Republic of China
- Province: Hunan
- Prefecture-level city: Shaoyang
- County-level city: Shaodong

Area
  - Total: 49 km^{2} (19 sq mi)

Population (2017)
  - Total: 29,259
  - Density: 600/km^{2} (1,500/sq mi)
- Time zone: UTC+08:00 (China Standard)
- Postal code: 422818
- Area code: 0739

Chinese name
- Traditional Chinese: 周官橋鄉
- Simplified Chinese: 周官桥乡
Transcriptions
Standard Mandarin
- Hanyu Pinyin: Zhōuguānqiáo Xiāng

Zhouguanqiao Township (Chinese: 周官桥乡) is a township in Shaodong, Hunan, China. As of the 2017 census it had a population of 29,259 and an area of 49-square-kilometre (19 sq mi).

== Administrative division ==
As of 2017, the township is divided into twenty-nine villages:

- Xi'an (息安村)
- Laoshanchong (老山冲村)
- Zhouzhu (周祝村)
- Wenggongci (文公祠村)
- Cheni (车泥村)
- Shengli (胜利村)
- Yangtang (羊塘村)
- Simachong (司马冲村)
- Xiaojiachong (肖家冲村)
- Putangchong (蒲塘冲村)
- Hanjing (汗井村)
- Qiaokou (桥口村)
- Daquanchong (大泉冲村)
- Huangdu (黄渡村)
- Zhongxin (中心村)
- Hejiaqiao (贺家桥村)
- Qiaotang (桥塘村)
- Chejia (车家村)
- Xianfeng (先锋村)
- Yangzhu (杨竹村)
- Honghe (洪合村)
- Zhouhe (周和村)
- Tongcheba (桐车坝村)
- Sanduo (三多村)
- Jiansheng (建胜村)
- Aixin (艾新村)
- Sansheng (三胜村)
- Hejia (合家村)
- Tianxing (天星村)

== Geography ==
Tong River (桐江河) flows through fifteen villages of the township.

== Economy ==
The local economy is primarily based upon agriculture and local industry. Leather is a major industry.

== Transport ==
Provincial Highway S336 and County Road X020 pass across the township northwest to southeast.
