= Shaodong =

Shaodong 邵东市
- County-level city
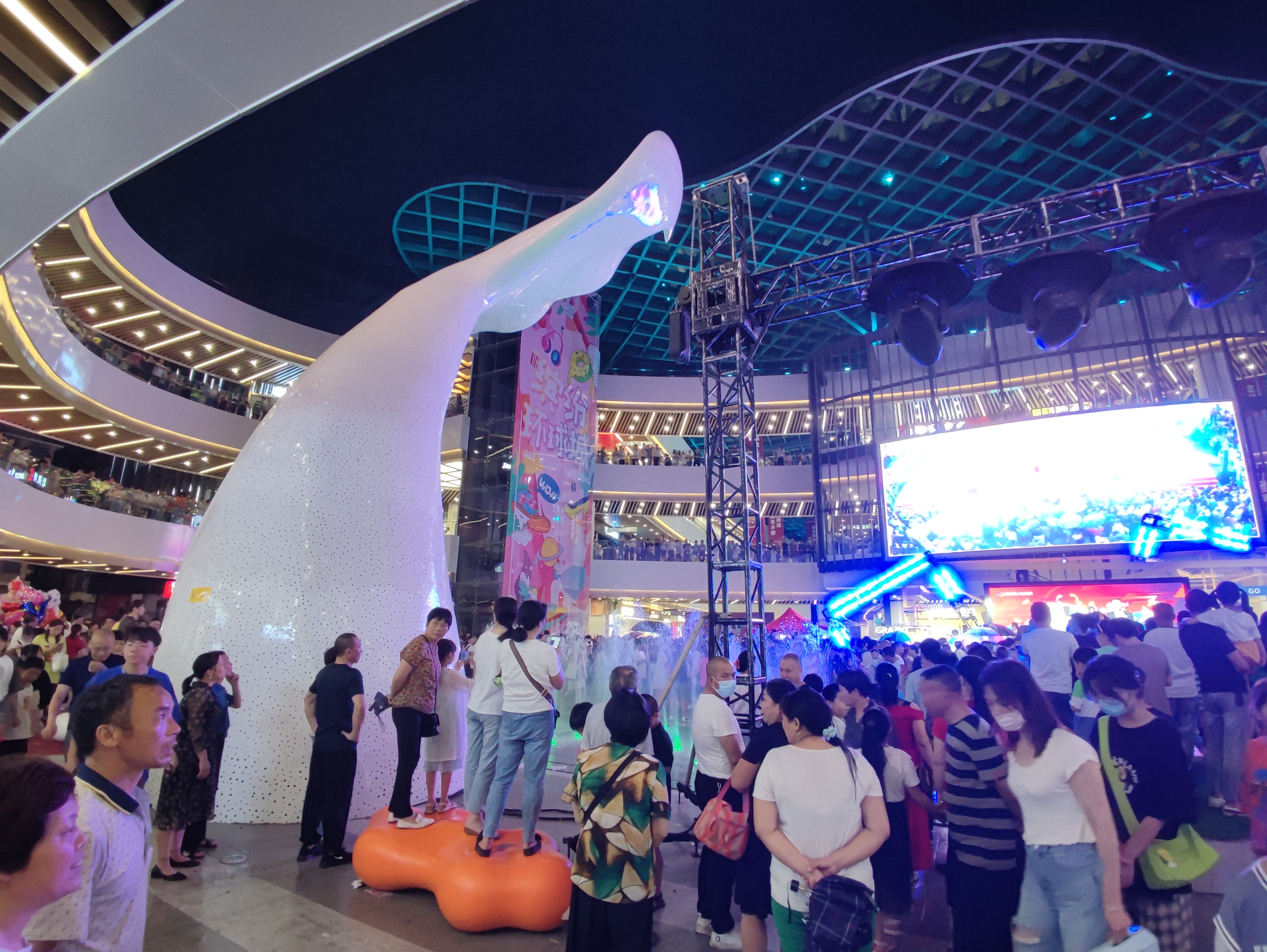
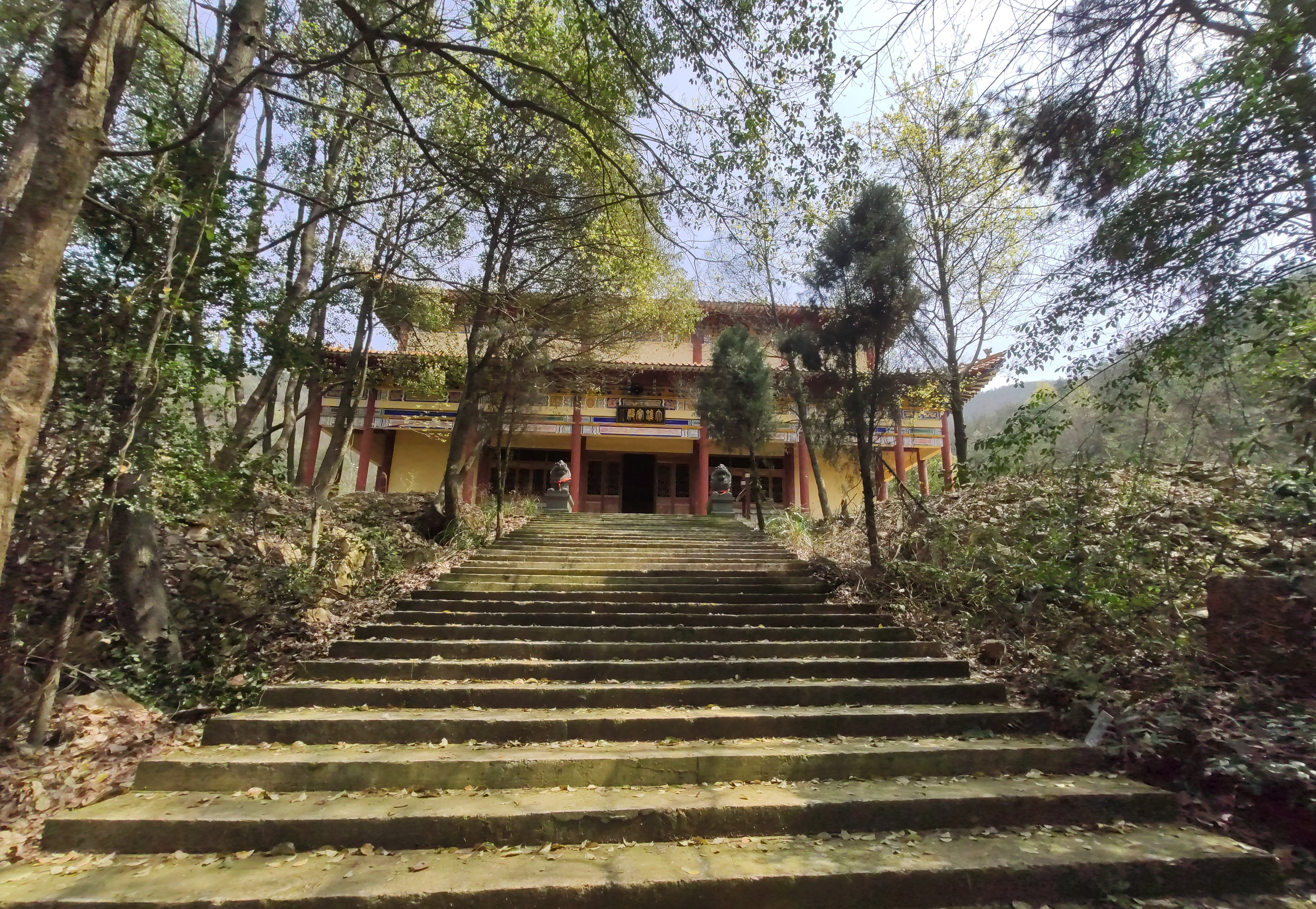
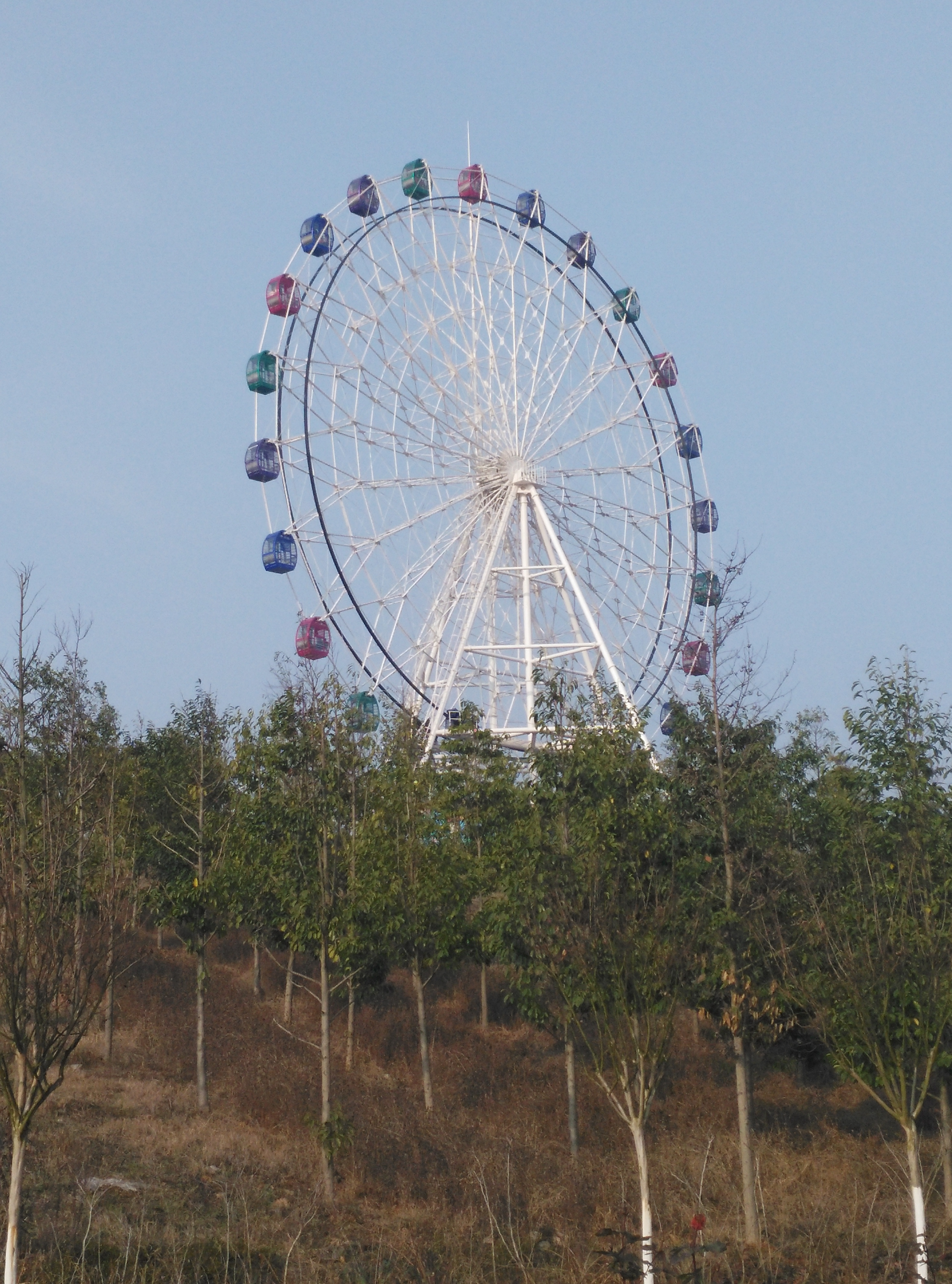
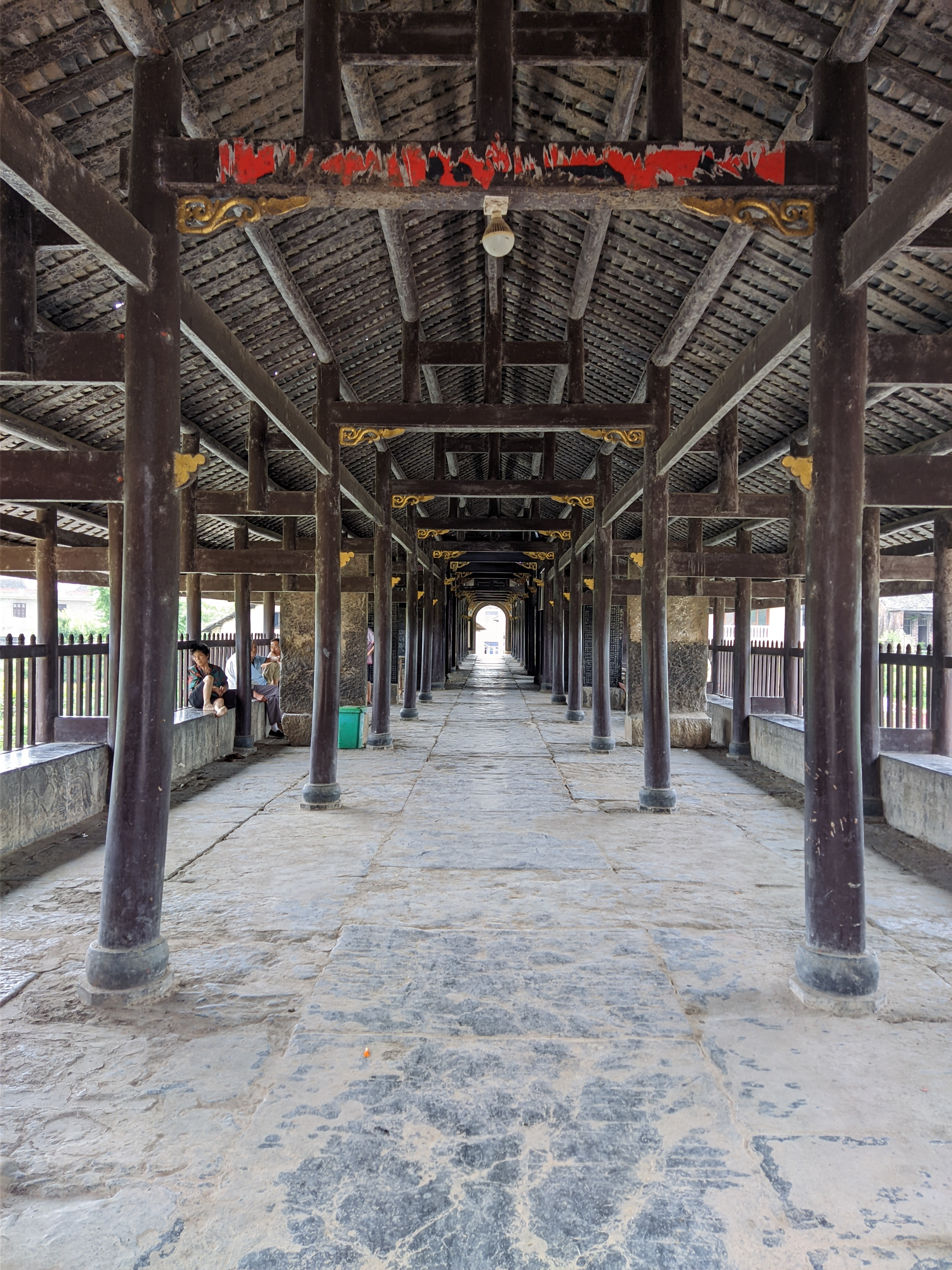
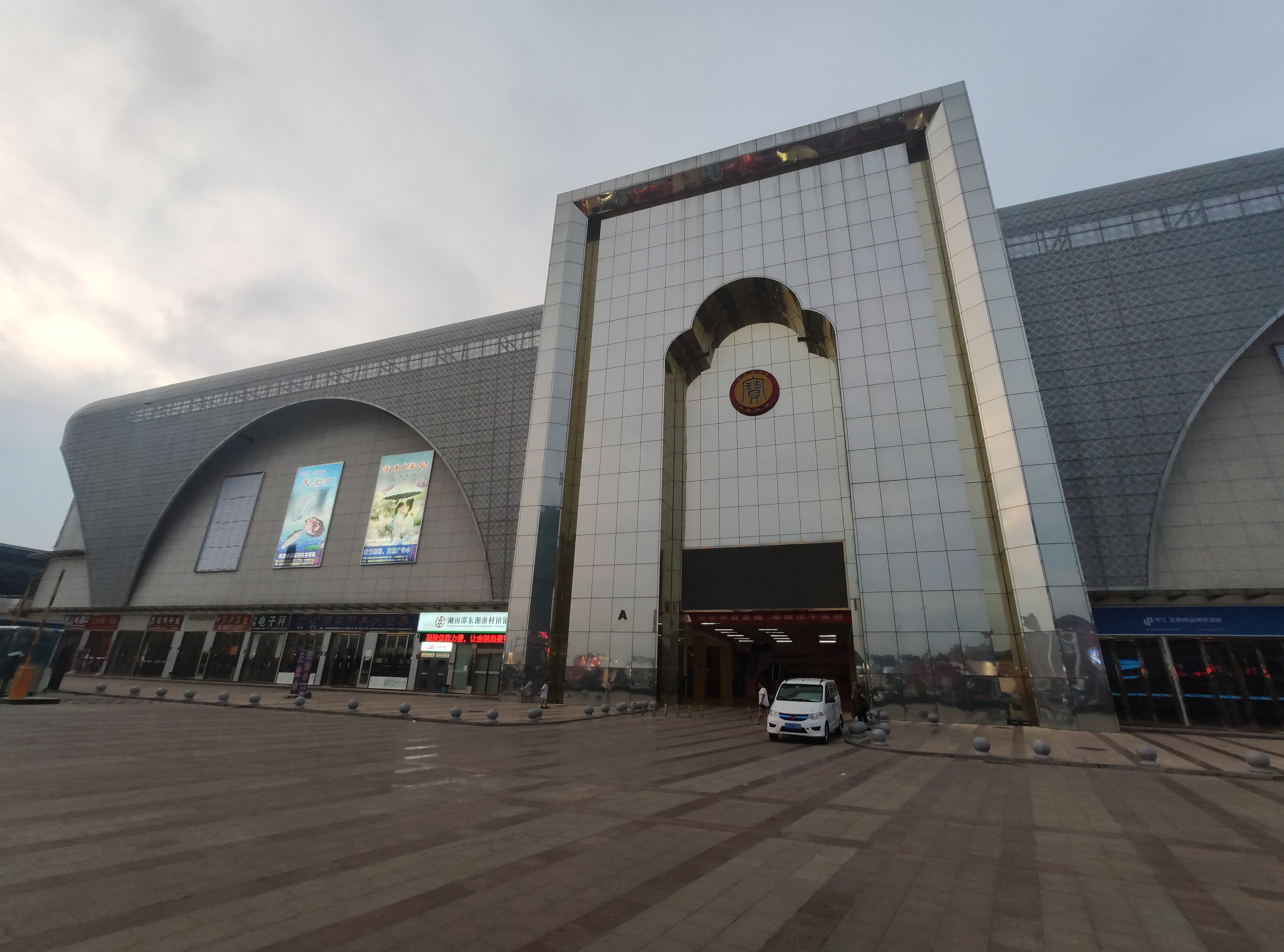
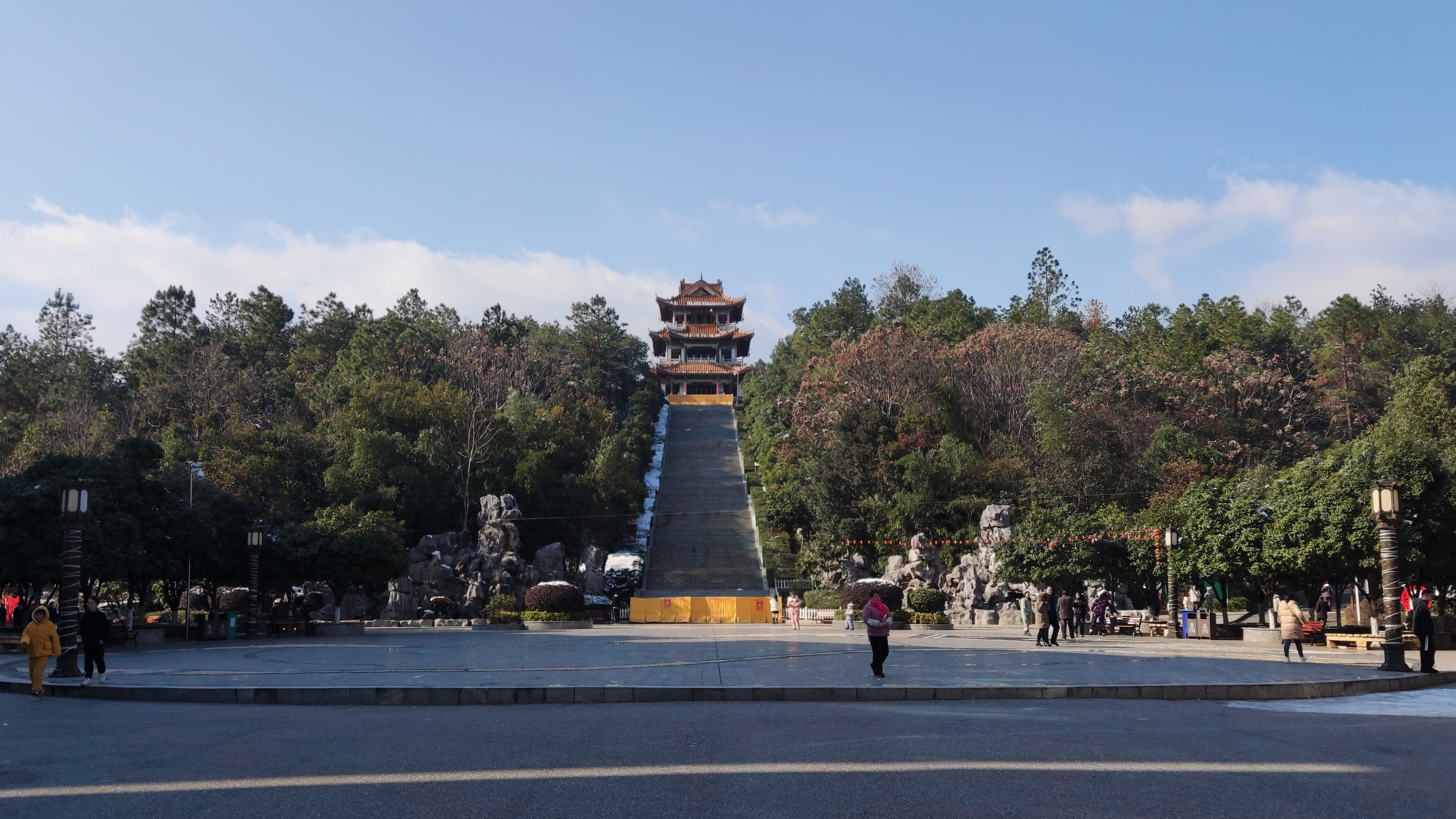
- Binfen Universal City (邵东缤纷环球城) Mount Shehu (佘湖山) Yihui Garden Resort (怡卉园度假景区) Hong Bridge (洪桥) Shaodong International Trade City (邵东国际商贸城) Zhaoyang Park (昭阳公园)

- Location in Hunan
- Coordinates: 27°15′36″N 111°44′39″E
- Country: China
- Province: Hunan
- Prefecture-level city: Shaoyang

Government
  - CCP Committee Secretary: Zhou Yufan (周玉凡)
  - Mayor: Li Guojun (李国军)

Area
  - Total: 1,778.47 km^{2} (686.67 sq mi)

Population (2020)
  - Total: 1,038,416
  - Density: 583.882/km^{2} (1,512.25/sq mi)
- Time zone: UTC+8 (China Standard)
- Postal code: 422800
- GDP Total (2022): CNY 72.15 billion USD 9.89 billion
- GDP growth rate (2022): ▲5.1%
- Website: www.shaodong.gov.cn

Shaodong (simplified Chinese: 邵东; traditional Chinese: 邵東; pinyin: Shàodōng; lit. 'east of Shao[yang]') is a county-level city in the Province of Hunan, China, it is under the administration of Shaoyang City. Shaodong is located in the central part of Hunan Province, covering an area of 1,778 square kilometers, with a permanent population of 1.0385 million. It is renowned as the "hometown of a hundred trades," "city of commerce," and "capital of private enterprises."

== History ==
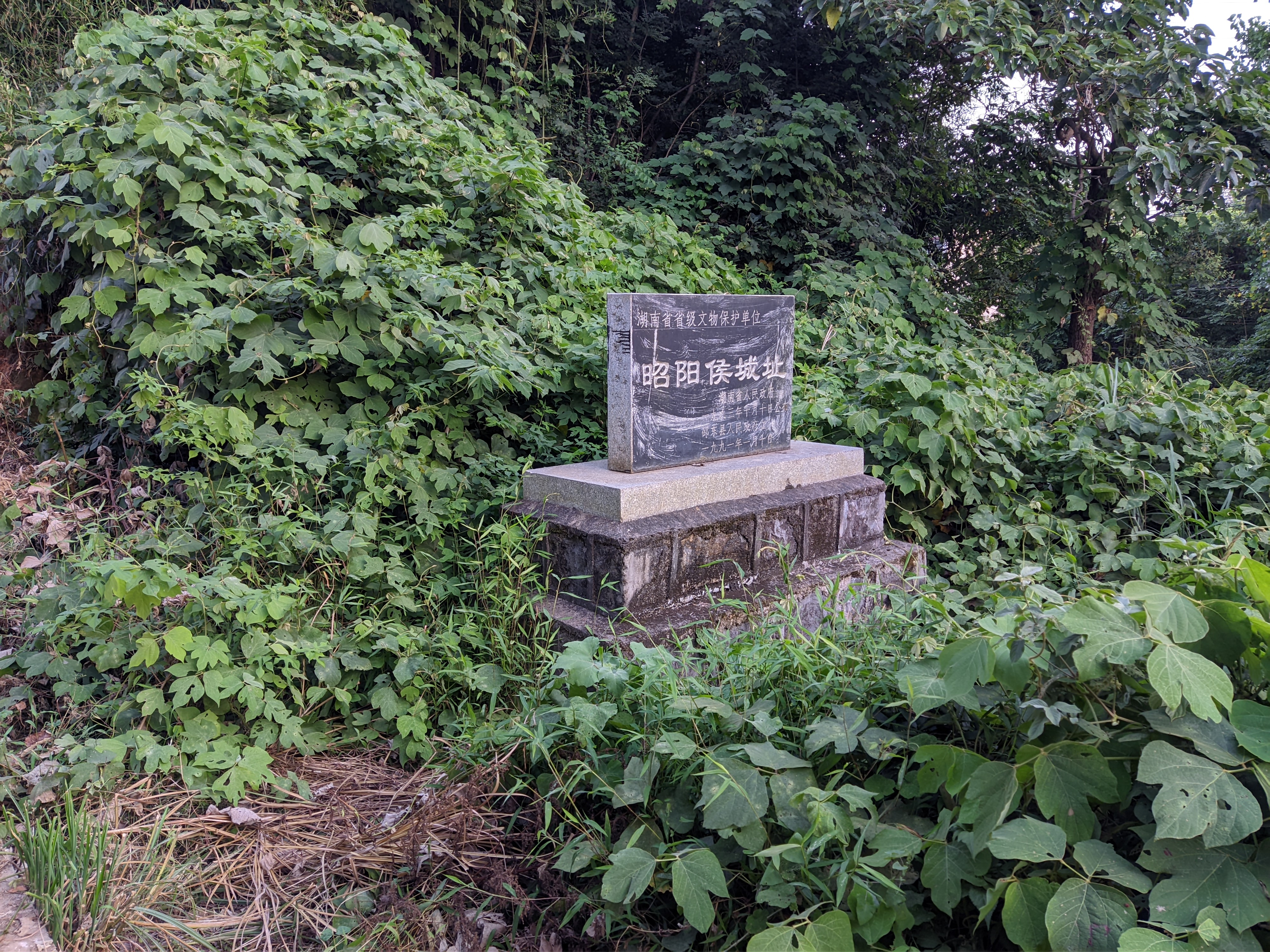
The State of Zhaoyang Ruins Stele

In 5 AD during the Western Han dynasty, the State of Zhaoyang (昭阳侯国) was established in what is now Tongyi Village (同意村), Dahetang Subdistrict (大禾塘街道), belonging to Lingling Commandery (零陵郡).

During the Eastern Han dynasty, Zhaoyang Marquisate (昭阳侯国) was changed Zhaoyang County.

In 280 AD during the Western Jin dynasty, to avoid the taboo of his father, Sima Zhao, Emperor Wu of Jin renamed Zhaoling Commandery (昭陵郡) to Shaoling Commandery (邵陵郡) and Zhaoyang County (昭阳县) to Shaoyang County (邵阳县).

In 581 AD during the Sui dynasty, Shaoling Commandery (邵陵郡) was abolished and renamed Shaoyang County (邵阳县), and the county seat was relocated from Yujiaqiao to present-day Shaoyang City.

In 1952, Shaodong County (邵东县) was established (named because its entire territory belonged to the eastern township of the old Shaoyang County) (原邵阳县), belonging to Shaoyang Special (Territorial) District (邵阳专(地)区).

In 1977, it was assigned to Lianyuan District (涟源地区).

In August 1983, Shaodong County (邵东县) was separated from Loudi District (娄底地区) and placed under the jurisdiction of Shaoyang City (邵阳市).

On July 12, 2019, with the approval of the State Council and the consent of the Ministry of Civil Affairs, Shaodong County (邵东县) was abolished and Shaodong City (邵东市), a county-level city, was established. Shaodong City is under the direct administration of Hunan Province, with Shaoyang City administering it.

== Geography ==
=== Location ===
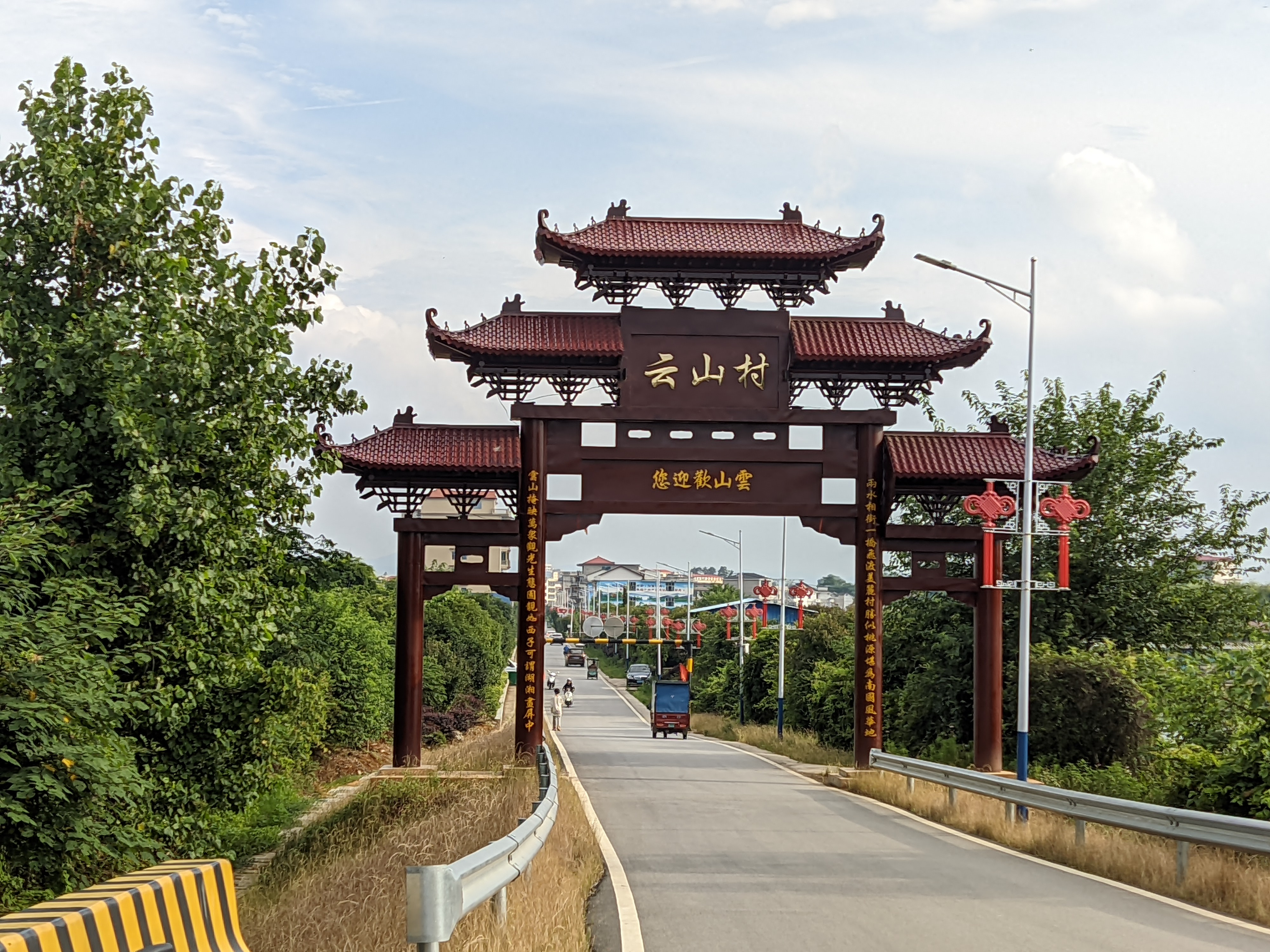
Yunshan Village

Located in the central Hunan, the city is bordered to the northeast by Shuangfeng County, to the north by Lianyuan City, to the northwest by Xinshao County, to the west by Shuangqing District of Shaoyang, to the south by Qidong County, to the southeast by Hengyang County. Shaodong is located between 111°30′E – 112°05′E longitude and 26°50′N – 27°28′N latitude. It administers 3 subdistricts, 18 towns, 4 townships and 1 provincial-level economic development zone. It stretches 59 kilometers from north to south and 56.7 kilometers from east to west, covering a total area of 1768.75 square kilometers.

=== Terrain ===
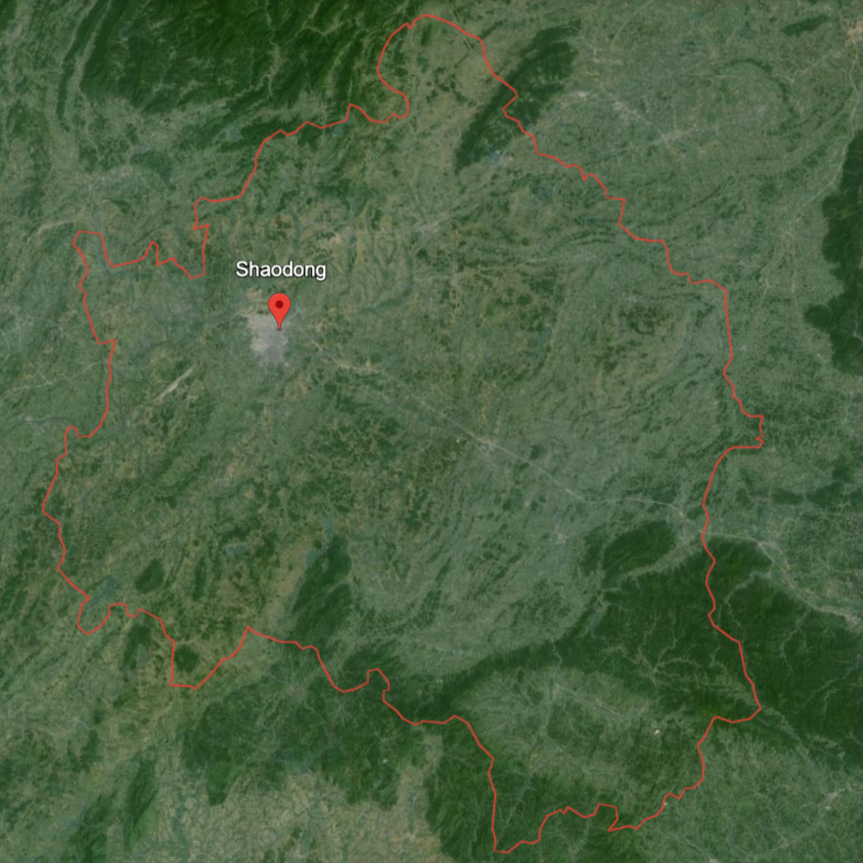
Satellite Image of Shaodong in 2013

The terrain belongs to the hilly area of central Hunan and features karst landforms. Hills and mounds account for 61.18% of the total area of the county, mountains cover 21.69%, and plains are mostly valley plains, accounting for only 10.85%. The terrain rises from south to north and tilts towards the central part. The central area rises and slopes eastward and westward in a step-like manner, forming the watershed of the three major water systems within the region. Shaodong is situated in the transitional zone between the Xuefeng Mountains and the Nanling Mountains. The area is characterized by hills, valleys, low hills, small plains, and several small basins. The terrain rises from south to north, with the central part lifting and sloping towards the east and west. From the terrain, it can be seen that the area through which the water systems of Shaodong flow is relatively small.

=== Climate ===
The city is located in a subtropical monsoon climate zone, characterized by mild temperatures and distinct four seasons. Spring is often rainy, summers are hot and long, autumns are mostly dry, and winters are short and cold. The annual average temperature is 16.6 °C. The average frost-free period is 270 days per year. The annual average precipitation ranges from 1150 to 1350 millimeters.

Climate data for Shaodong, elevation 253 m (830 ft), (1991–2020 normals, extremes 1991–present)
Month	Jan	Feb	Mar	Apr	May	Jun	Jul	Aug	Sep	Oct	Nov	Dec	Year
Record high °C (°F)	26.5 (79.7)	29.9 (85.8)	33.7 (92.7)	35.0 (95.0)	35.6 (96.1)	36.5 (97.7)	39.4 (102.9)	39.7 (103.5)	37.2 (99.0)	35.9 (96.6)	32.1 (89.8)	23.5 (74.3)	39.7 (103.5)
Mean daily maximum °C (°F)	8.6 (47.5)	11.4 (52.5)	15.6 (60.1)	22.1 (71.8)	26.4 (79.5)	29.4 (84.9)	32.7 (90.9)	32.3 (90.1)	28.4 (83.1)	23.0 (73.4)	17.5 (63.5)	11.5 (52.7)	21.6 (70.8)
Daily mean °C (°F)	5.1 (41.2)	7.5 (45.5)	11.4 (52.5)	17.4 (63.3)	21.9 (71.4)	25.3 (77.5)	28.0 (82.4)	27.3 (81.1)	23.5 (74.3)	18.2 (64.8)	12.6 (54.7)	7.1 (44.8)	17.1 (62.8)
Mean daily minimum °C (°F)	2.6 (36.7)	4.7 (40.5)	8.4 (47.1)	14.0 (57.2)	18.5 (65.3)	22.2 (72.0)	24.4 (75.9)	23.8 (74.8)	20.0 (68.0)	14.7 (58.5)	9.1 (48.4)	4.0 (39.2)	13.9 (57.0)
Record low °C (°F)	−7.9 (17.8)	−6.3 (20.7)	−1.3 (29.7)	2.0 (35.6)	9.9 (49.8)	14.8 (58.6)	18.0 (64.4)	16.8 (62.2)	11.7 (53.1)	3.2 (37.8)	−1.8 (28.8)	−10.0 (14.0)	−10.0 (14.0)
Average precipitation mm (inches)	61.2 (2.41)	65.4 (2.57)	130.2 (5.13)	140.3 (5.52)	172.3 (6.78)	201.8 (7.94)	134.3 (5.29)	110.2 (4.34)	60.4 (2.38)	63.1 (2.48)	65.5 (2.58)	49.2 (1.94)	1,253.9 (49.36)
Average precipitation days (≥ 0.1 mm)	14.4	14.1	17.1	16.3	16.4	14.6	10.3	11.1	8.4	9.5	10.7	10.9	153.8
Average snowy days	4.1	2.5	0.5	0	0	0	0	0	0	0	0.1	1.3	8.5
Average relative humidity (%)	80	80	82	81	81	83	78	79	79	78	79	77	80
Mean monthly sunshine hours	59.9	57.4	77.0	106.6	131.4	138.7	229.9	213.7	155.9	127.0	114.1	90.3	1,501.9
Percentage possible sunshine	18	18	21	28	31	34	55	53	43	36	36	28	33
Source: China Meteorological Administration

=== Water systems ===
The region has three major surface water systems: Shao River (邵水), Zheng River (蒸水), and Ce River (测水). Zheng River and Ce River flow eastward into the Xiang River, while Shao River flows westward into the Zi River. The total annual runoff volume is approximately 24.87 billion cubic meters. The region also boasts abundant groundwater resources, with good outcrop conditions, and reserves reaching up to 460 million cubic meters in an average year.

== Resources ==
The region is rich in resources, with coal and gypsum as the main minerals. The proven coal reserves are around 40 million tons, and gypsum reserves are approximately 320 million tons, both ranking among the top in the province. Additionally, there are deposits of manganese, lead, zinc, uranium, iron, silica sand, barite, plastic clay, limestone, and others. The soil types include paddy soil (水稻土), laterite, Loess, and others, totaling 7 categories, 16 subcategories, 51 genera, and 137 species.

The Niumasi Coal Mine produces bituminous coal, characterized by low ash, low sulfur, low phosphorus, and easily separable high-quality coking coal. The Niumasi mining area has been in operation for over 200 years, and by the Guangxu period (1875–1908), the coal mining industry had begun to take shape. During the Republic of China era (1912–1949), 13 joint-stock companies such as Henry and Changfeng were successively established. By the mid-1970s, the annual output of the Niumasi coal mine reached as high as 750,000 tons, ranking among the top 100 coal enterprises in the country for three consecutive years.

== Economy ==
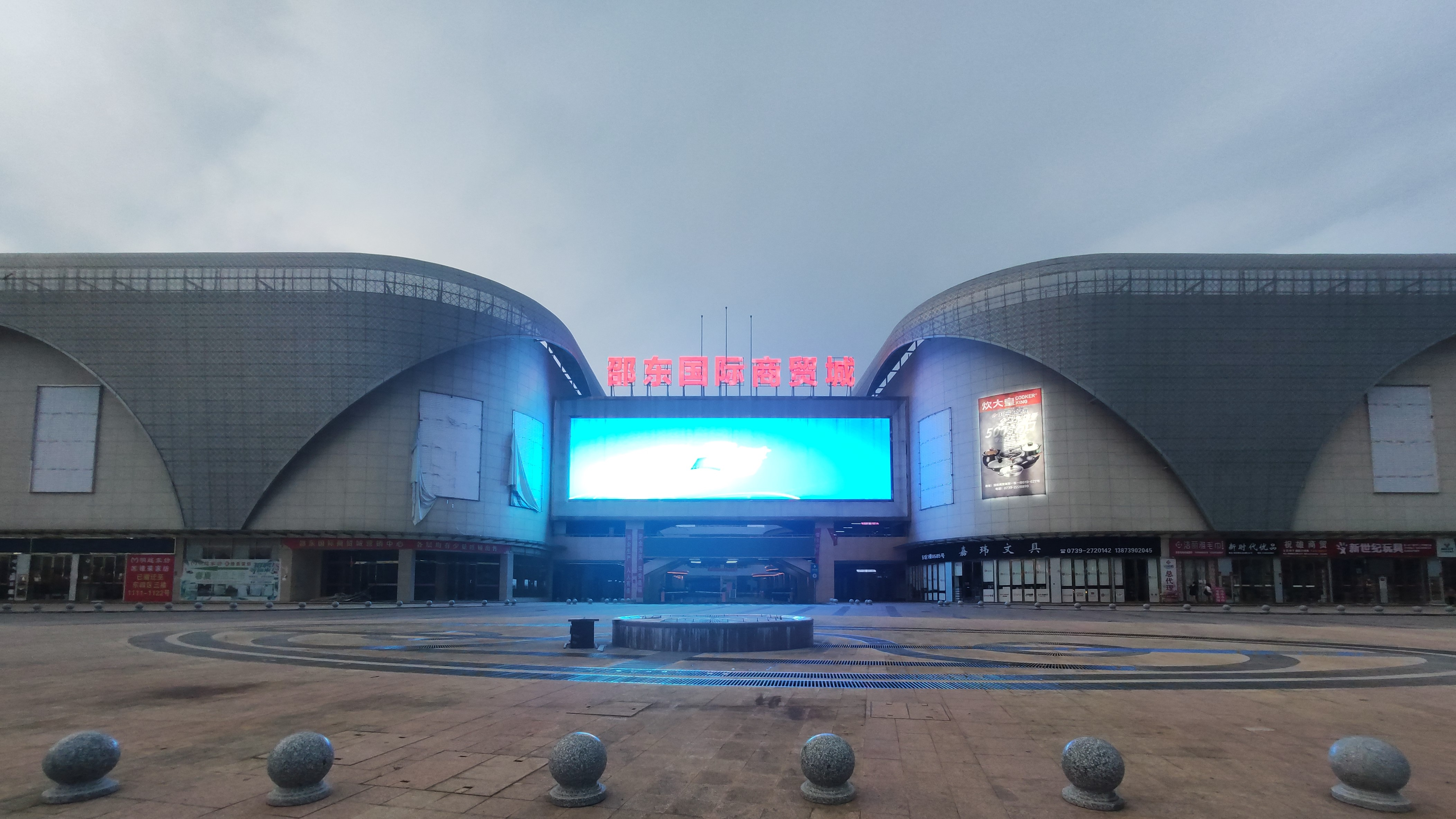
Shaodong International Trade City

Shaodong is renowned for its titles of "Hometown of Hundred Trades," "City of Commerce," and "Capital of Private Enterprises." It holds distinctions such as being an advanced county in national scientific and technological progress, a production base for Chinese luggage and leather goods, a transformation and upgrading base for national lighter and luggage processing and trade, the top county in China for lighters production, and a key county in Hunan Province for characteristic manufacturing industries. These accolades serve as regional development hallmarks for the city.

In 2022, the city's GDP reached 721.5 billion yuan (CNY), with a 5.1% increase compared to the previous year when adjusted for comparable prices. Specifically, the value added of the primary industry was 63.8 billion yuan, growing by 3.8%; the value added of the secondary industry was 273.9 billion yuan, increasing by 7.5%; and the value added of the tertiary industry was 383.8 billion yuan, with a growth rate of 3.8%. The proportions of the three industries in the overall structure were 8.8% for the primary industry, 38% for the secondary industry, and 53.2% for the tertiary industry. The total electricity consumption of the whole society was 2.17 billion kilowatt-hours, up by 6.2%; industrial electricity consumption was 860 million kilowatt-hours, increasing by 2.9%. The service industry continued to recover, with the operating income of service enterprises above a certain scale reaching 1.672 billion yuan, a 16% increase; the total profit was 109 million yuan; taxes and additional fees amounted to 9.8 million yuan, and value-added tax payments reached 13 million yuan. The average number of employees was 7,009.

=== Primary industry ===
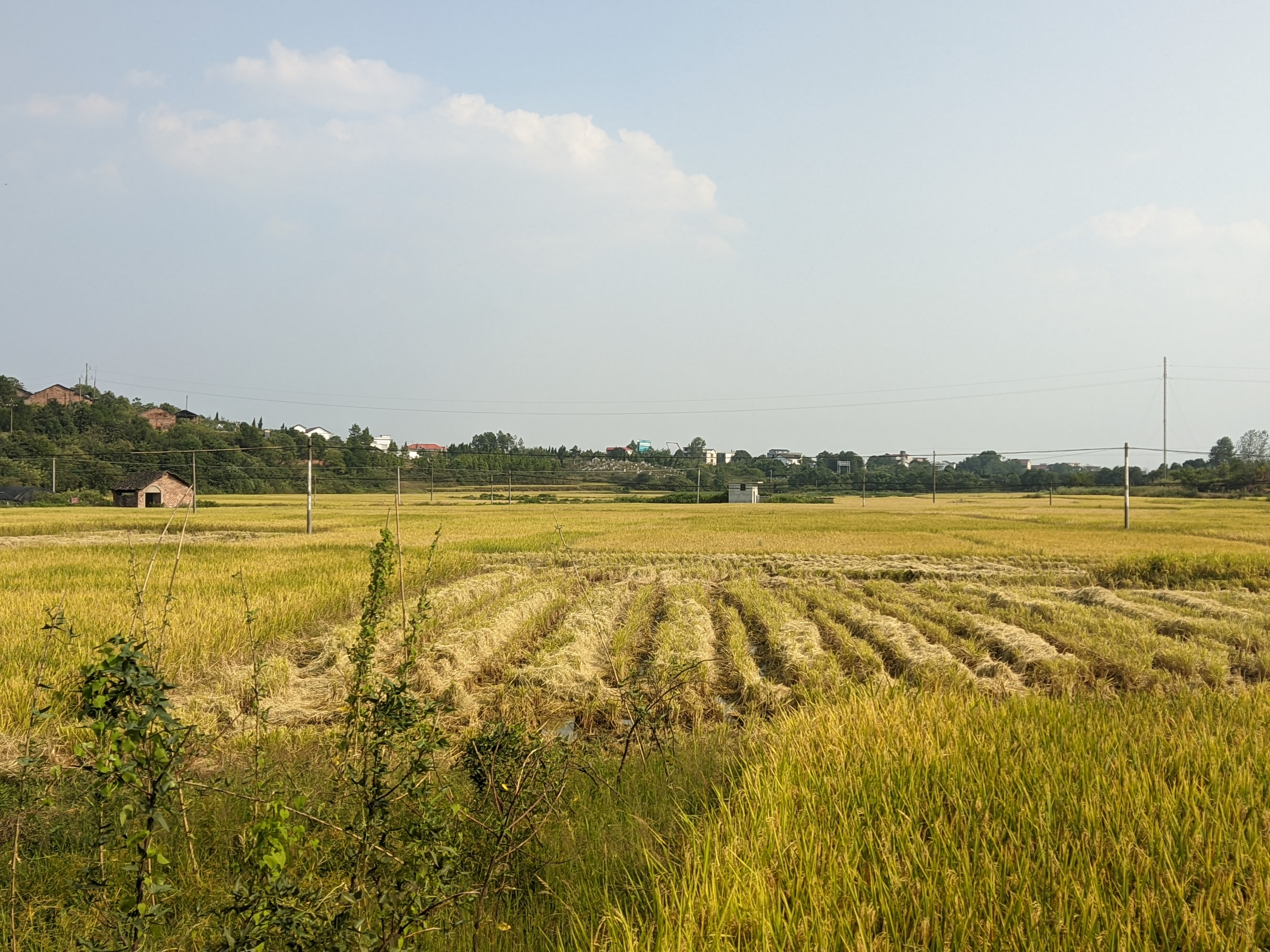
Shaodong Rice Field

The main agricultural products in the area include rice, wheat, sweet potatoes, soybeans, peanuts, and rapeseed. Economic crops mainly consist of long yellow daylily, Chinese medicinal herbs, citrus fruits, and watermelons. Shaodong's long yellow daylily and yuzhu have been listed as protected geographical indication products in China. Among them, Shaodong long yellow daylily has long been famous, earning Shaodong the title of "Hometown of long yellow daylily". The product has always been popular both domestically and internationally. Shaodong is a major production area and trading hub for yuzhu and peony, known for its high quality. Other products such as danpi (丹皮) and Chinese peony are also well-known. Huangcaoping Forest Farm is the first tea oil forest farm in Hunan Province, and it has cultivated excellent tea tree varieties, producing extraordinary tea tree oil.

In 2022, Shaodong City achieved a total output value of 11.004 billion yuan in agriculture, forestry, animal husbandry, and fishery, a year-on-year increase of 3.9%. Specifically, agriculture amounted to 7.04 billion yuan, a growth of 2.7%; forestry reached 95 million yuan, a significant increase of 58.6%; animal husbandry amounted to 2.92 billion yuan, up by 5.4%; fisheries reached 580 million yuan, increasing by 1.3%; and agricultural, forestry, animal husbandry, and fishery services amounted to 370 million yuan, growing by 9.4%.

=== Secondary industry ===
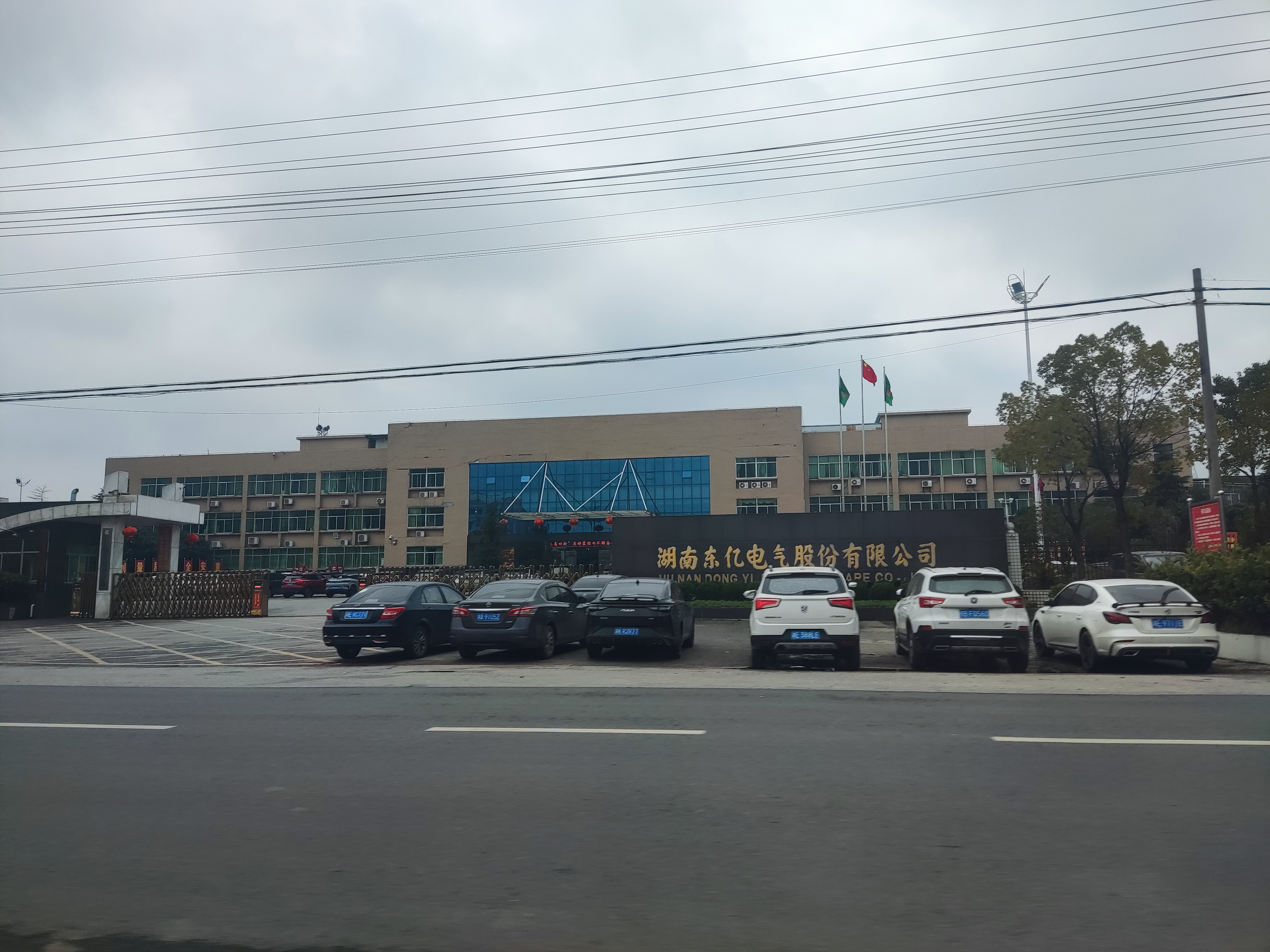
Dongyi Electric, Shaodong Lighter Giant

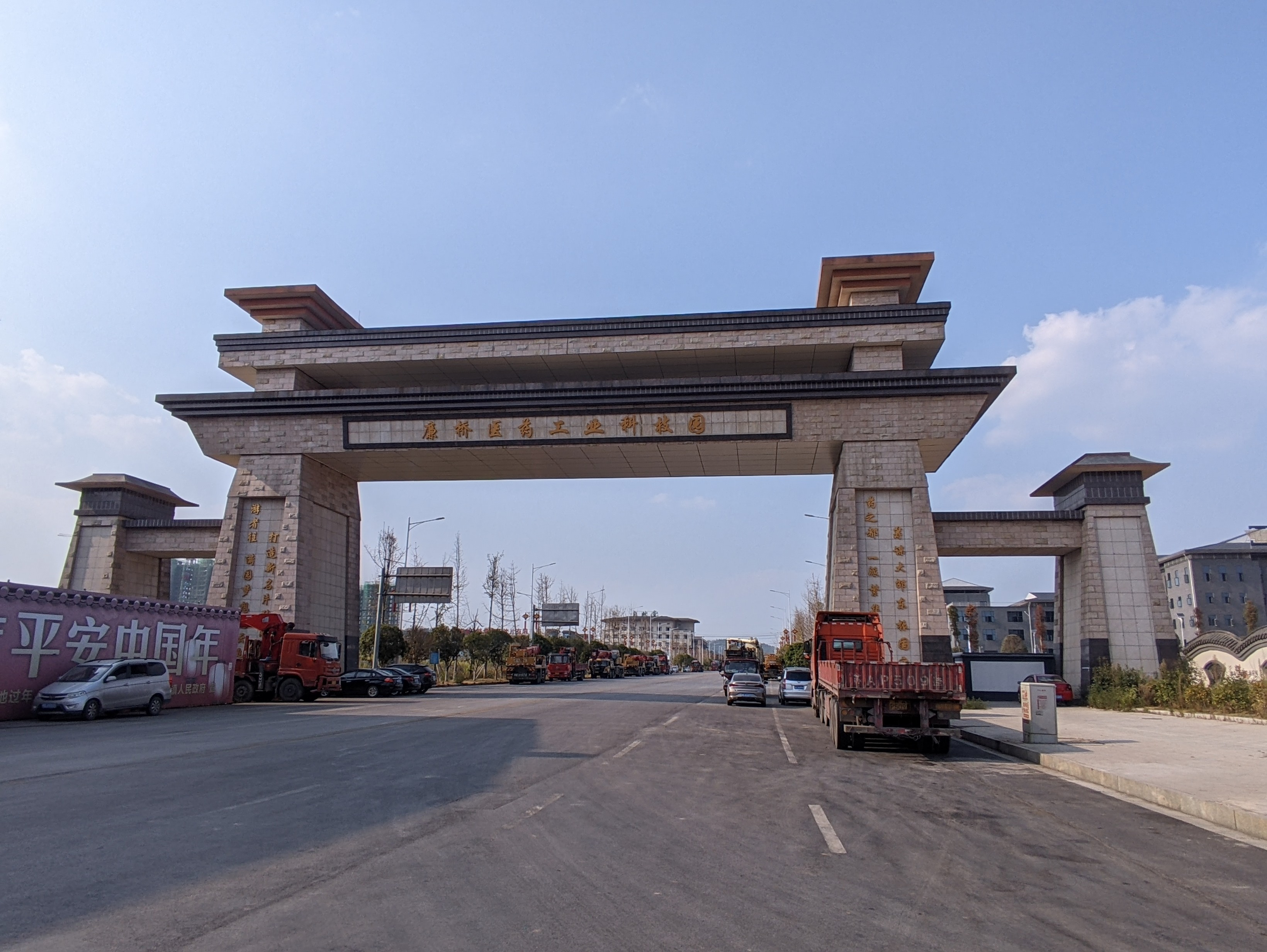
Lianqiao Medical Park

Shaodong's light industry is quite active, serving as a renowned production base for luggage and leather goods, national lighters and hand tools in China. Additionally, it has substantial presence in industries such as consumer electronics, traditional Chinese medicine, red envelopes, contact lenses, and electronic displays. The lighter production alone accounts for approximately 70% of the global output, with a highly integrated and automated industry chain. Shaodong actively develops strategic emerging industries such as consumer electronics, smart manufacturing, biomedicine, new materials, and new energy, while vigorously promoting the automation and intelligent transformation and upgrading of traditional industries.

Hunan Shaodong Economic Development Zone is a provincial-level development zone at the prefecture level. It was later merged with the original Shaodong Ecological Industrial Park. It is recognized as one of the top ten most investment-worthy parks for Hunan entrepreneurs worldwide. Additionally, it serves as a demonstration base for industrial transfer and new industrialization in the province, as well as a demonstration base for the "Mass Entrepreneurship and Innovation" initiative in Hunan Province. In 2017, it successfully ranked among the top ten parks in the province. The zone has formed industries dominated by light manufacturing (luggage, hand tools, lighters, etc.) and intelligent manufacturing, with traditional Chinese medicine processing as a characteristic industry, and forward-looking layouts for high-end equipment manufacturing and electronic information as future industries.

There are a total of 782 industrial enterprises in the zone, including 505 large-scale industrial enterprises. There are 21 enterprises with annual main business income of over 1 billion yuan and 7 enterprises with annual main business income of over 2 billion yuan. In 2022, the zone is expected to achieve a total industrial output value of 139.278 billion yuan, an added value of scale industries of 25.803 billion yuan, a main business income of high-tech industries of 90.928 billion yuan, a tax payment of 2.08 billion yuan, attracting 39 projects for investment, with a total contract investment of 3.791 billion yuan, including 13 projects with an investment of 50 million to 200 million yuan and 7 projects with an investment of 200 million to 1 billion yuan. The Shaodong Xiangshang Industrial Park is located in the southern part of the new industrial zone of the Shaodong Ecological Industrial Park. Relying on the resources of Hunan entrepreneurs, the park has established a demonstration area for attracting Hunan entrepreneurs to invest and develop in Shaodong, with complete infrastructure, high-standard standardized factory buildings, and supporting services, focusing on the development of leather goods, clothing, hardware, electronics, and pharmaceuticals industries.

=== Tertiary industry ===
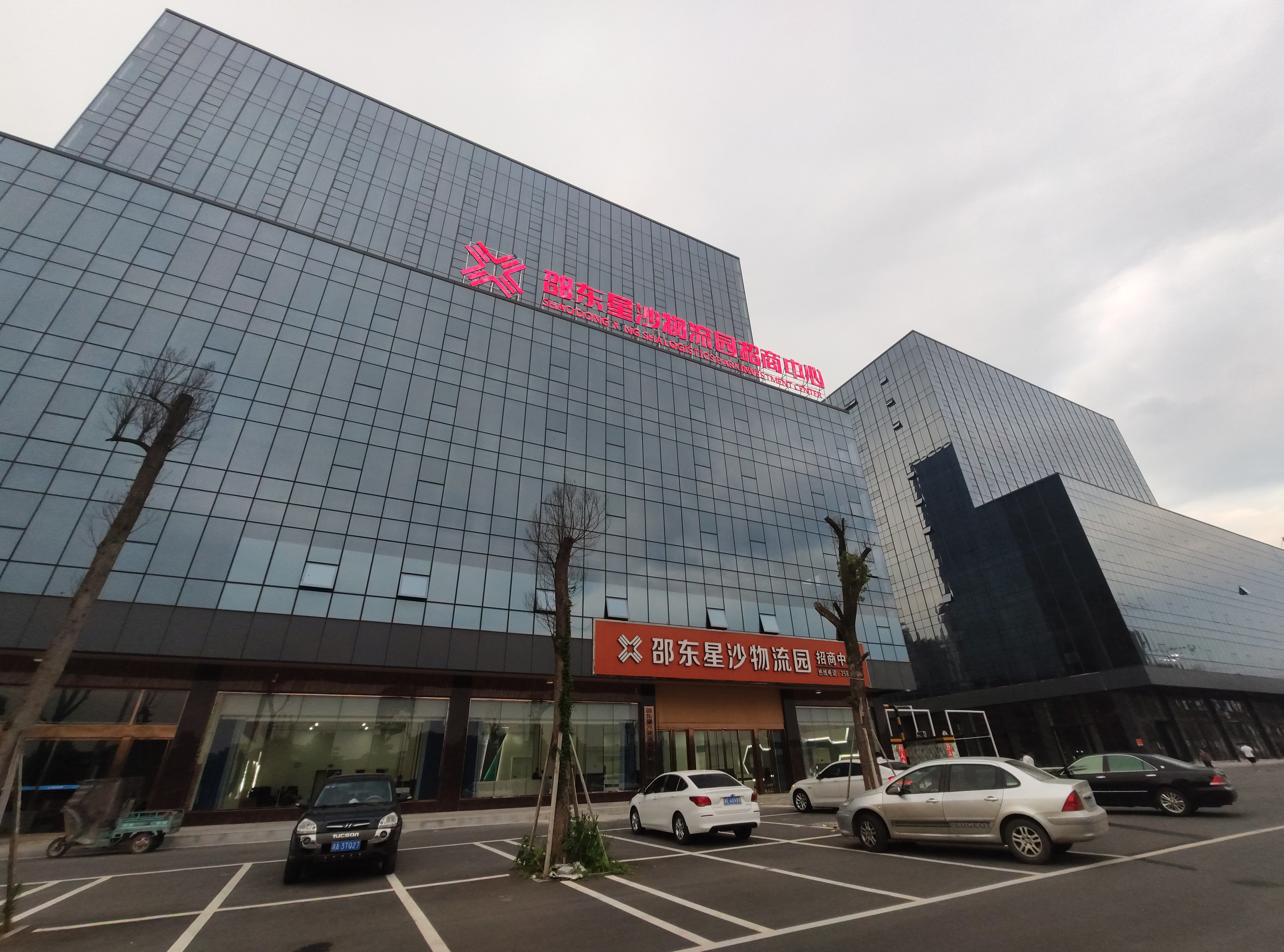
Xingsha Logistics Park

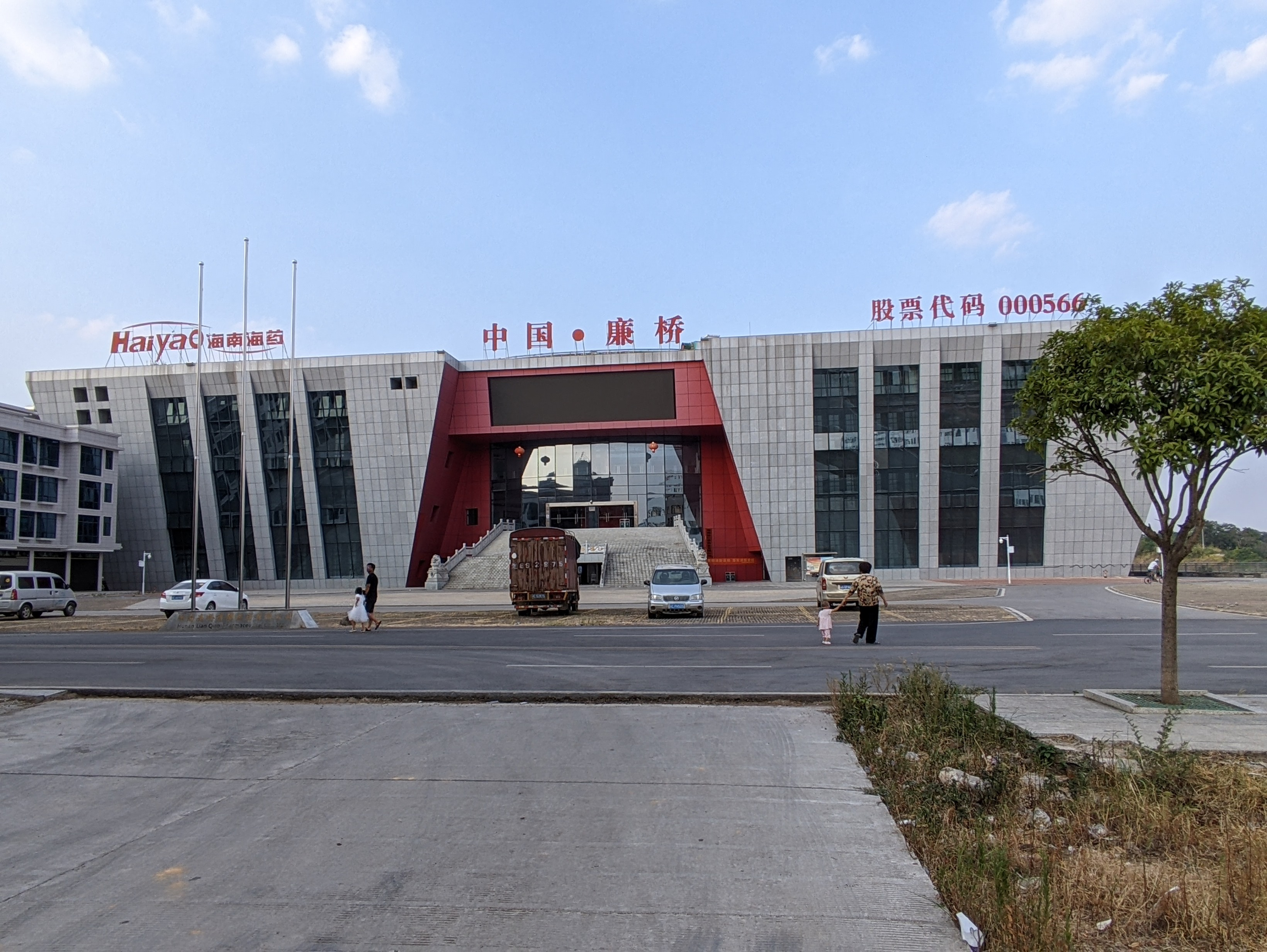
Lianqiao Medical Trade Center

Shaodong has earned the reputation of being the "City of Commerce," with its market trade serving as the economic hallmark of the region. The market plays a vital role in Shaodong's economy, serving as its backbone and leveraging its traditional advantages. Over the years, the robust growth of Shaodong's economy has largely been attributed to the powerful driving and radiating effects of its market. The market has made irreplaceable contributions to Shaodong's economic development.

Currently, there are 102 specialized markets, comprehensive markets, and agricultural and sideline product markets, covering an area of 2,200 acres, with a building area of 1 million square meters, and more than 15,000 operating storefronts and over 20,000 stalls. Some notable marketplaces in Shaodong include the Shaodong International Trade City, Lianqiao Chinese Medicinal Materials Professional Market (ranked third in national trading volume), China Shaodong (International) Leather Goods Industrial and Trade Park, Centralsouth Hand Tools Wholesale Market, Shaodong Fruit and Vegetable Wholesale Market, Oriental Home Furnishing Plaza, Shaodong Home Appliance City, Shaodong Glasses City, Shaodong Building Decoration Materials Wholesale Market, Shaodong Sugar, Liquor, Staple Food and Fruit Wholesale Market, and Xujiapu Wood Market.

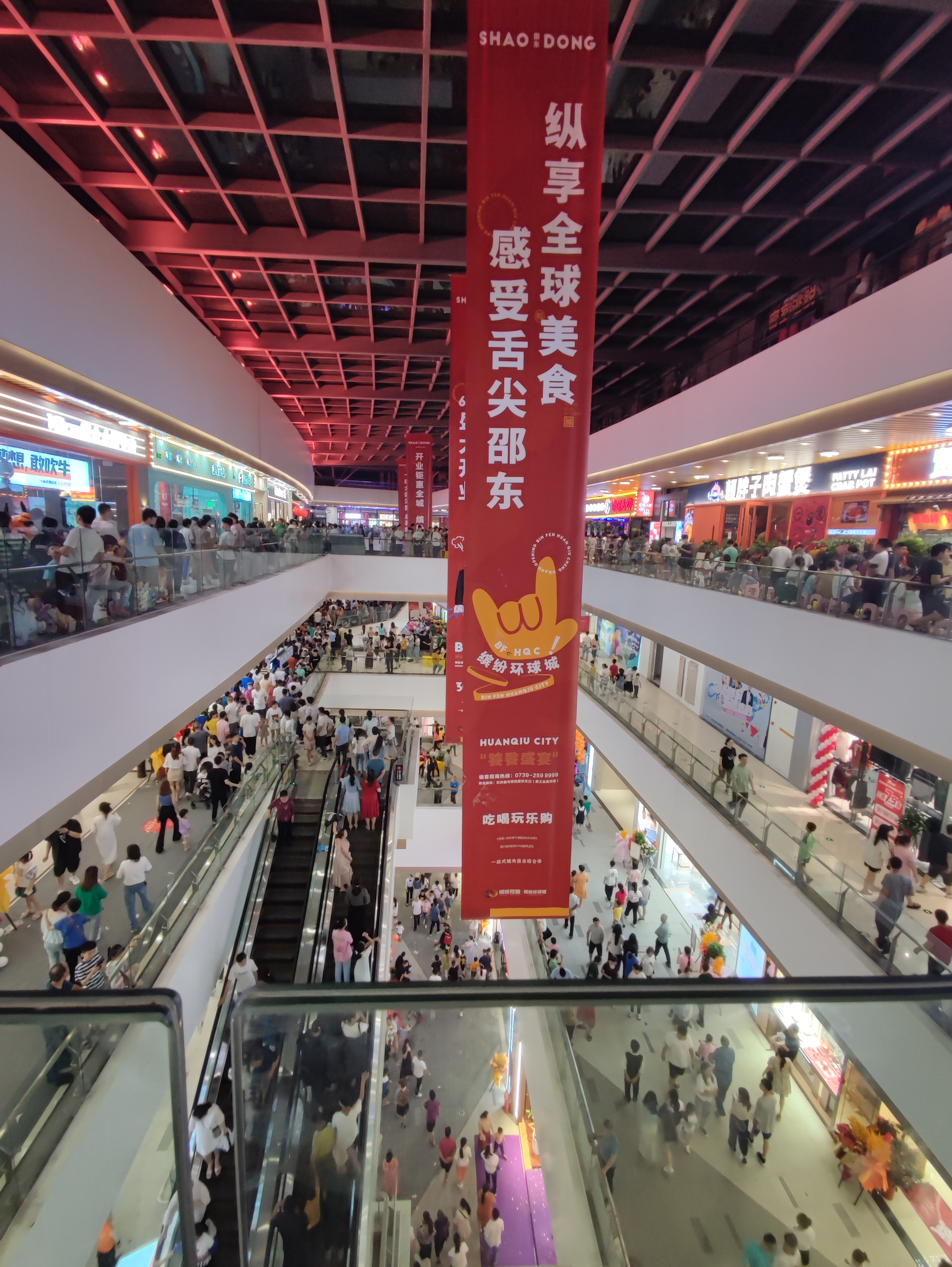
Shaodong Binfen Universal City

In 2022, Shaodong achieved a total retail sales of consumer goods of 31.508 billion yuan, a year-on-year increase of 2.3%. Looking at different areas, urban retail sales reached 27.91 billion yuan, up by 2.1%, while rural retail sales reached 3.599 billion yuan, up by 3.1%. By industry, wholesale trade achieved retail sales of 3.08 billion yuan, up by 2.1%, retail trade achieved retail sales of 241.97 billion yuan, up by 2.5%, accommodation services achieved retail sales of 718 million yuan, up by 2.3%, and catering services achieved retail sales of 3.51 billion yuan, up by 0.5%. Retail sales above the quota reached 12.92 billion yuan, up by 7.8%, while retail sales below the quota reached 18.58 billion yuan, down by 1.3%. In 2022, Shaodong achieved a total import and export value of 14.876 billion yuan, a year-on-year increase of 21.43%, with exports reaching 14.16 billion yuan, up by 17.72%, and imports reaching 713 million yuan, up by 223.77%. Actual domestic investment reached 12.93 billion yuan, up by 6.6%. Actual utilization of foreign capital was 223.07 million US dollars, up by 503.8%. In 2022, the balance of deposits in financial institutions in Shaodong reached 64.579 billion yuan, an increase of 8.515 billion yuan over the beginning of the year, representing a growth of 15.19%. The balance of loans reached 41.593 billion yuan, an increase of 4.37 billion yuan over the beginning of the year, representing a growth of 11.74%.

== Politics ==
=== Structure ===
Current leaders of the Shaodong Municipal Government
Institution	The Shaodong Municipal Committee of the Chinese Communist Party	The Shaodong Municipal Standing Committee of the People's Congress	Shaodong Municipal People's Government	The Shaodong Municipal Committee of the Chinese People's Political Consultative Conference
Title	Secretary	Director	Mayor	Chairman
Name	Zhou Yufan (周玉凡)	Huang Fuping (黄负平)	Li Guojun (李国军)	Luo Jiankang (罗健康)

Like all governing institutions in mainland China, Shaodong has a parallel party-government system, in which the CCP Committee Secretary outranks the mayor. The CCP committee acts as the top policy-formulation body has control over the Shaodong Municipal People's Government.

=== Administrative divisions ===
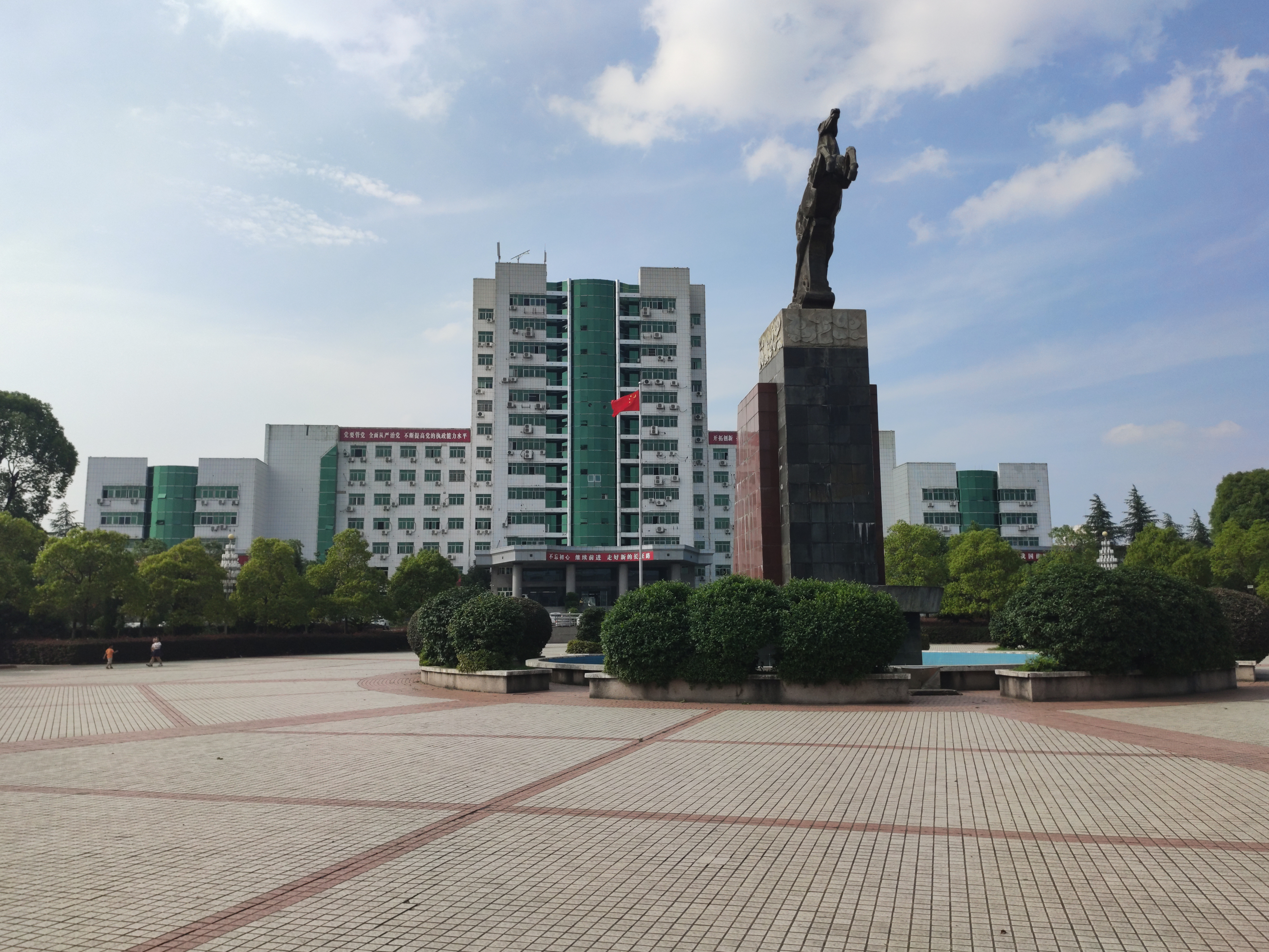
Shaodong City Hall

The county has 3 subdistricts, 18 towns and 4 townships under its jurisdiction, and the county seat is Dahetang Subdistrict (大禾塘街道).

3 subdistricts

Dahetang (大禾塘街道), Liangshitang (两市塘街道), Songjiaping (宋家塘街道)

18 towns

Heitianpu (黑田铺镇), Huochangping (火厂坪镇), Xianzhaqiao (仙槎桥镇), Jianjialong (简家陇镇), Jieling (界岭镇), Jiulongling (九龙岭镇), Lianqiao (廉桥镇), Lingguandian (灵官殿镇), Liuguangling (流光岭镇), Liuze (流泽镇), Niumasi (牛马司镇), Shashi (砂石镇), Shetianqiao (佘田桥镇), Shuidongjiang (水东江镇), Tuanshan (团山镇), Weijiaqiao (魏家桥镇), Yangqiao (杨桥镇), Yejiping (野鸡坪镇)

4 townships

Baomianqian (堡面前乡), Shuangfeng (双凤乡), Zhouguanqiao (周官桥乡), Zhuoshicao (斫石曹乡)

== Demographics ==
According to the data from the 7th National Population Census, as of November 1, 2020, the permanent population of Shaodong City was 1,038,416 people, an increase of 141,797 people compared to the 6th National Population Census in 2010, representing a growth rate of 15.8% and an average annual growth rate of 1.48%.

Among the city's permanent population, there were 543,351 males, accounting for 52.32%, and 495,065 females, accounting for 47.68%. The sex ratio (with females as 100 and males as a ratio to females) was 109.75, an increase of 1.12 compared to the data from the 2010 Sixth National Population Census.

In terms of age distribution, the population aged 0–14 was 221,123, accounting for 21.29%; the population aged 15–59 was 599,688, accounting for 57.75%; and the population aged 60 and above was 217,605, accounting for 20.96%, with the population aged 65 and above being 166,326, accounting for 16.02%. Compared to the 6th National Population Census data, the proportion of the population aged 0–14 decreased by 1.17 percentage points, the proportion of the population aged 15–59 decreased by 2.73 percentage points, and the proportion of the population aged 60 and above increased by 3.9 percentage points, with the proportion of the population aged 65 and above increasing by 4.44 percentage points.

In terms of educational attainment among the city's permanent population, there were 65,789 individuals with a university education or above; 202,722 individuals with a high school education (including vocational school); 407,479 individuals with a junior high school education; and 271,465 individuals with an elementary school education.

The city had a total of 374,425 family households and 9,030 collective households, with a population of 970,053 in family households and 68,363 in collective households. The average population per family household was 2.59 people, a decrease of 0.69 compared to the 2010 Sixth National Population Census.

== Transportation ==
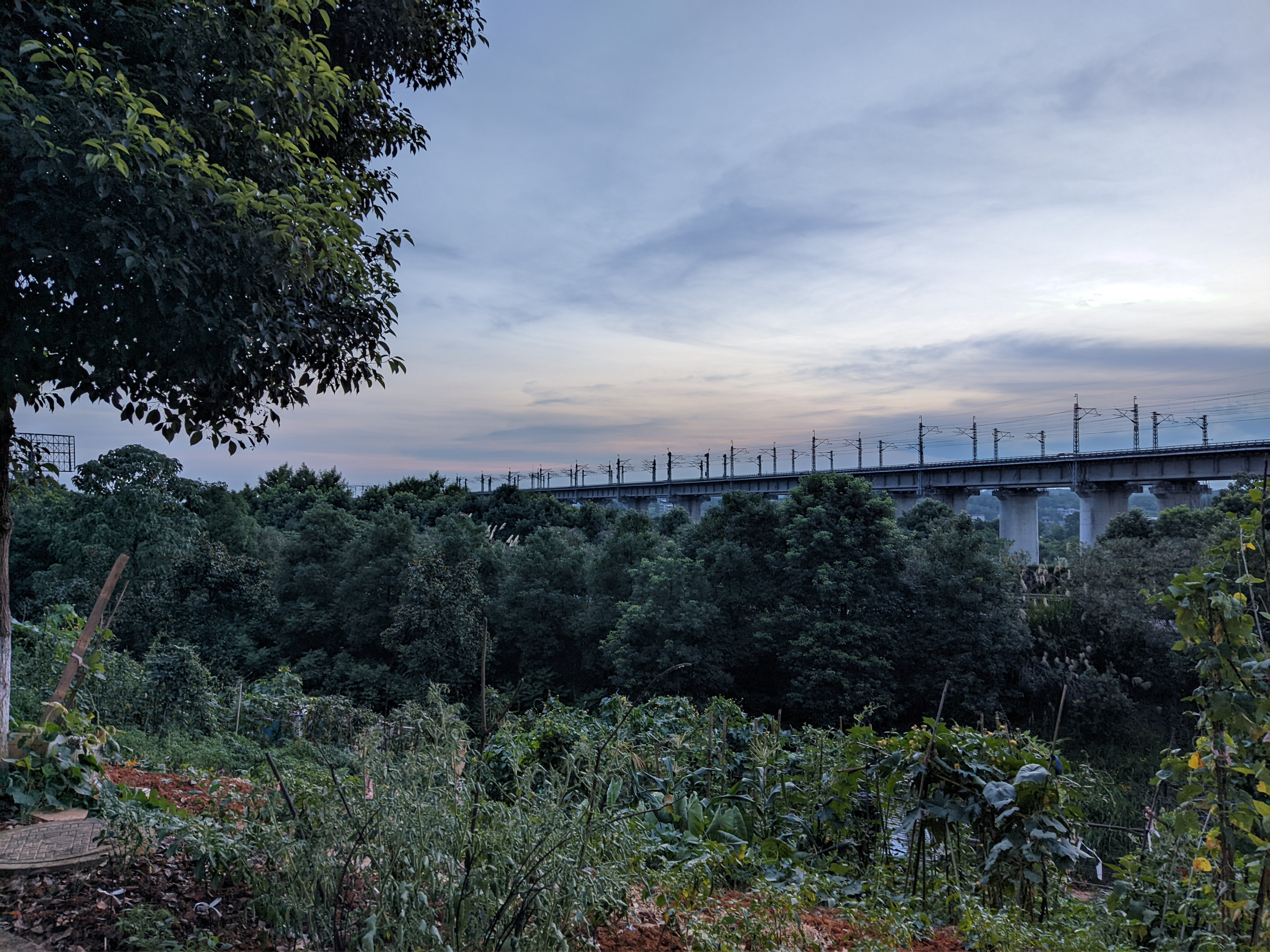
High-speed railway elevated viaduct

=== Railways ===
There are two railway stations: Shaodong railway station and Yangqiao railway Station.

Transit railways include: Huaihua–Shaoyang–Hengyang railway (high-speed) and Yiyang–Zhanjiang railway (partial high-speed).

=== Expressways ===
National

G60 Shanghai–Kunming Expressway

Provincial

S80 Hengyang-Shaoyang Expressway

=== Highways ===
National

China National Highway 320

Provincial

- Vertical: S336, S226, S227
- Horizontal: S333, S336, S549

== Travel ==
The area boasts rich tourism resources, including representative Hunan architecture such as the Qing dynasty mansion of the wealthy rice merchant Yinjia Tang, a nationally designated key cultural relic protection unit. There's also the 3A-grade resort area of Yihui Garden, the residence of the famous Tang dynasty scholar Shen Taizhi at Mount Dayun, Mount Shehu, inscribed with calligraphy by Emperor Suzong of Tang, Jiulongling (九龙岭), where the Song dynasty calligrapher Zhou Dunyi washed his ink brushes, as well as Liuguangling (流光岭) Scenic Area, Yanzhuyan by Pantang Reservoir, Pengshantang Ancient House, the thousand-year-old ancient maple trees in Changdaochong along the Shuidongjiang, and the ancient temple and Buddha land of Mount Shehu, all of which constitute the unique tourist attractions of Shaodong.

Furthermore, there are numerous provincial cultural relic protection units in Hunan Province, including the Han dynasty the state of Zhaoyang Ruins, the residence of the musical genius He Luting, the Hong Bridge from the Ming dynasty, the residence of Yuan Guoping, the director of the New Fourth Army Political Department, the residence of Li Shouxuan, a founding lieutenant general, the residence of Xie Song, the commander of the First Detachment of Guerrillas, the residence of Yan Guaiyu, a peculiar figure in journalism, the typical site of agricultural and water conservancy heritage at Yejiping in the Great Leap Forward, the site of the Hengbao Battle (including the martyrs' tombs), the tomb of the national martyr He Jinsheng, and the tomb of the May Fourth Movement pioneer Kuang Husheng.

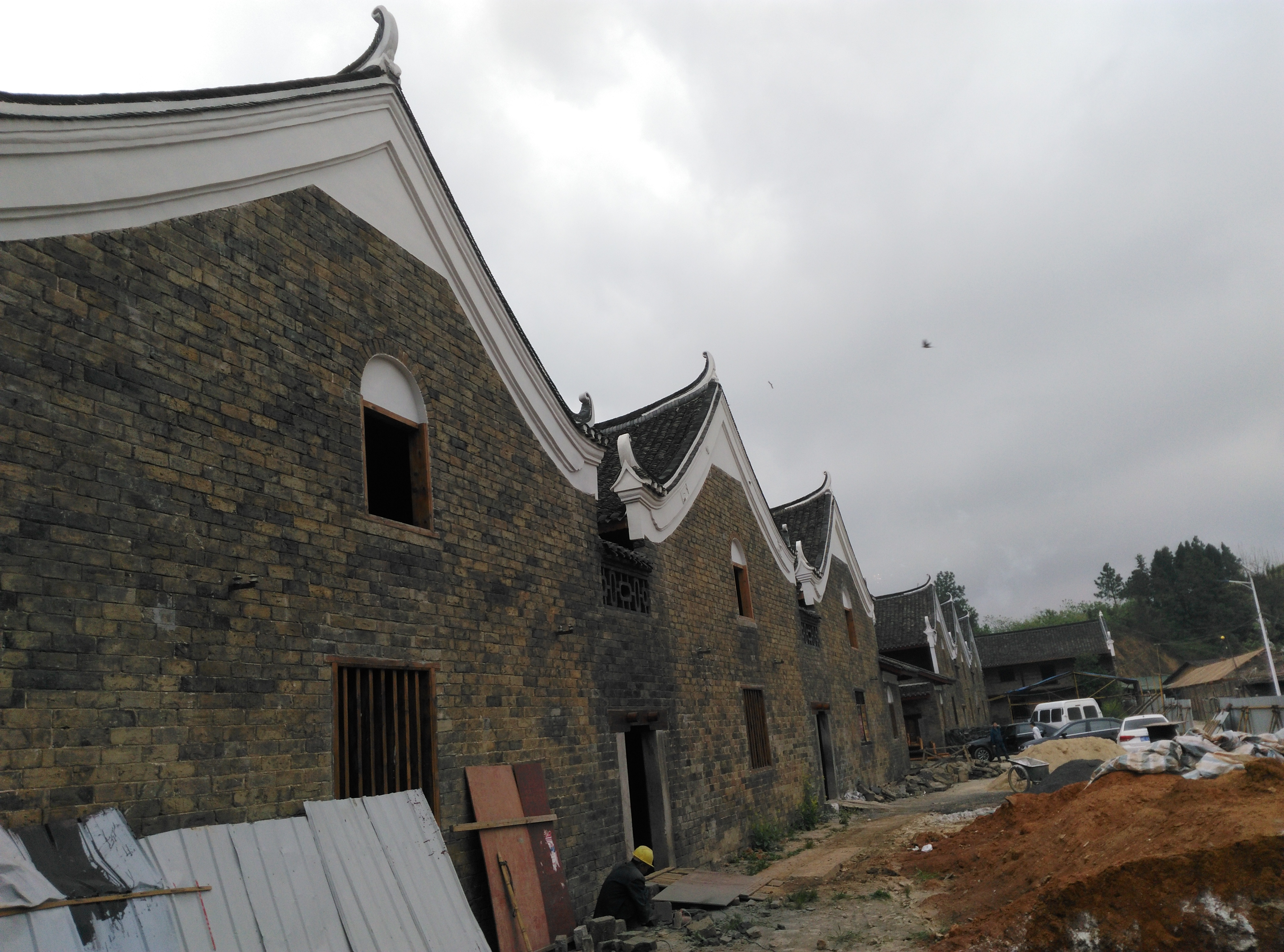
Yinjia Tang (荫家堂)

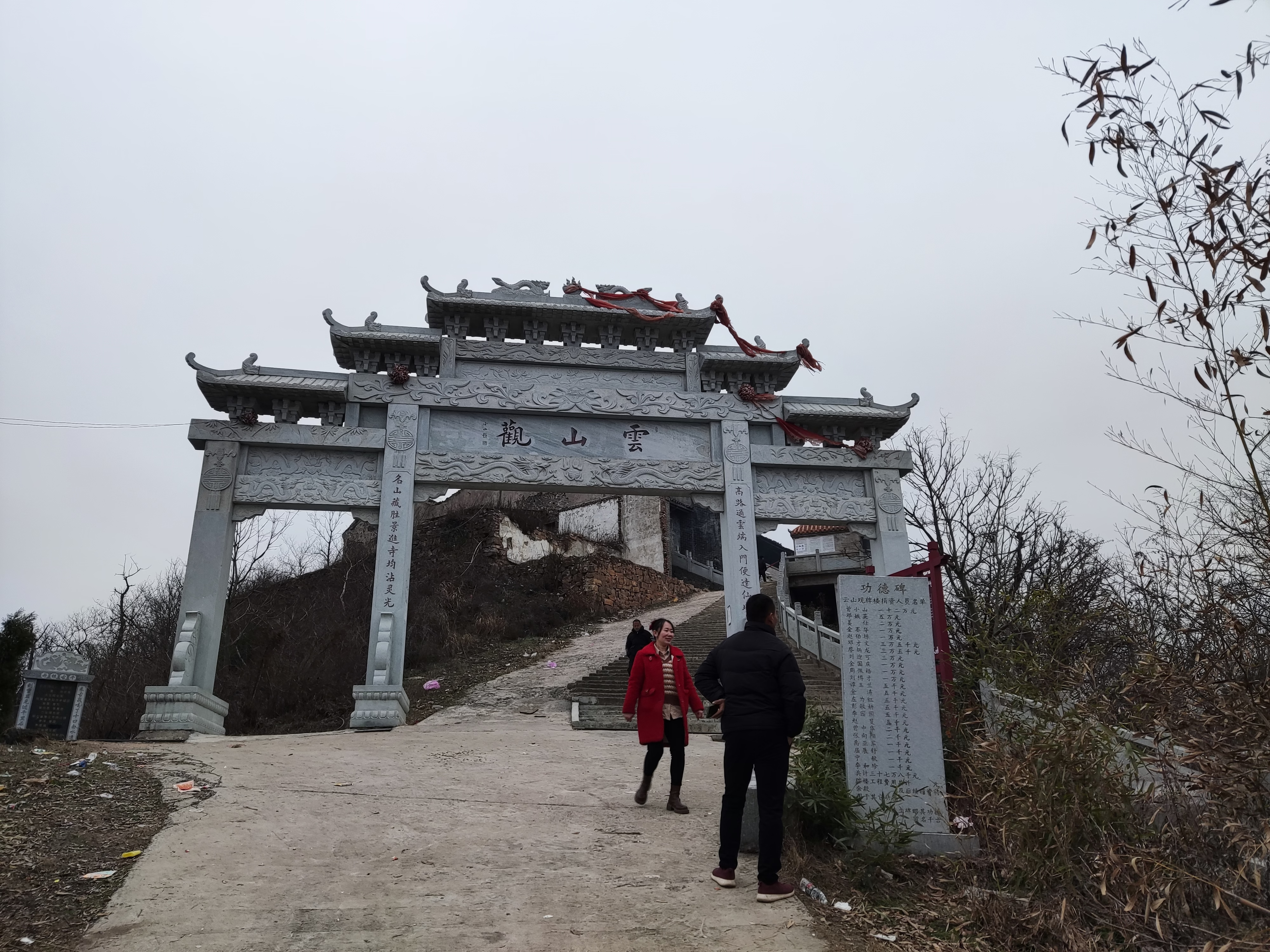
Mount Shehu (佘湖山)

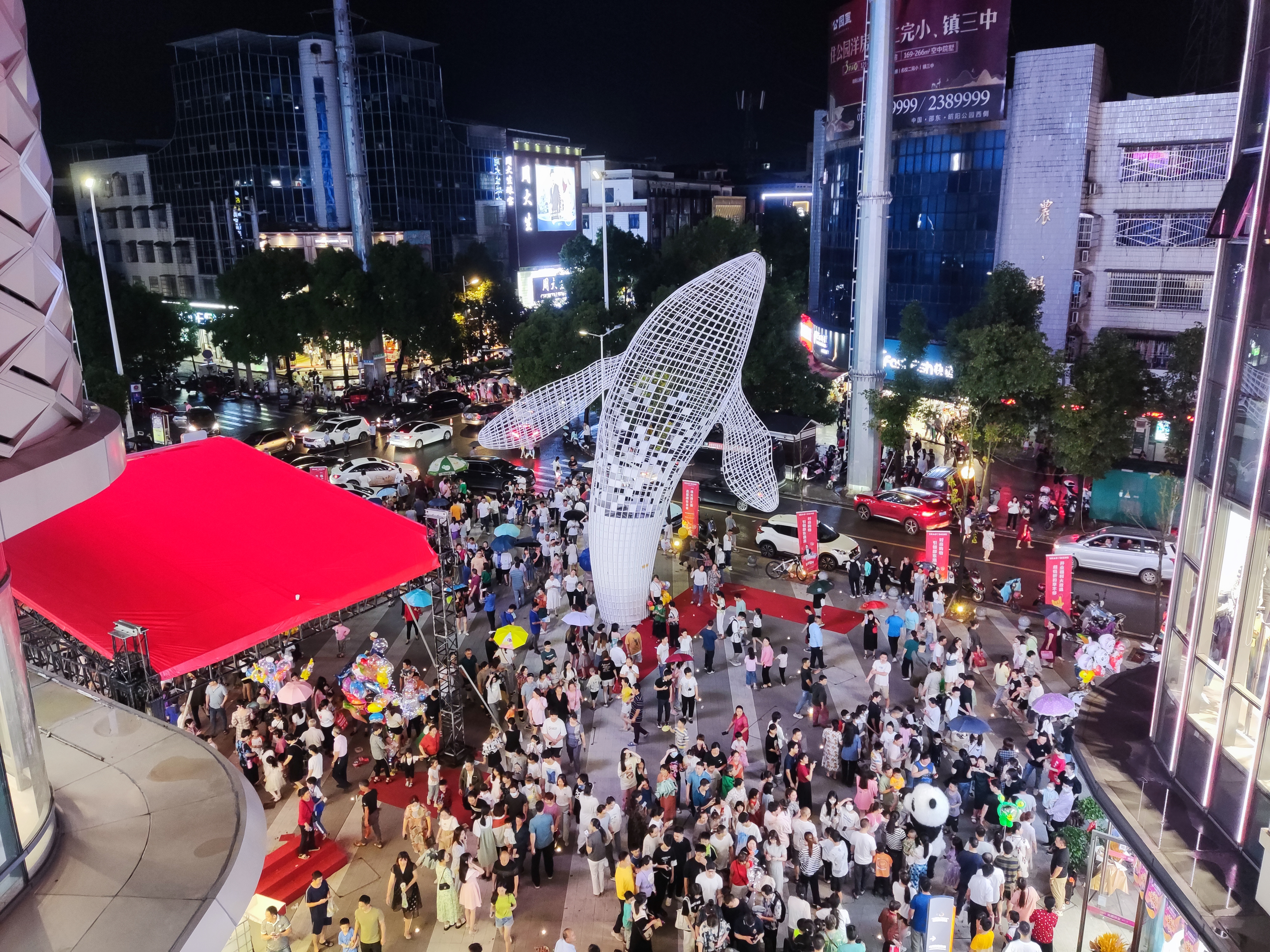
Shaodong Binfen Universal City (邵东缤纷环球城)

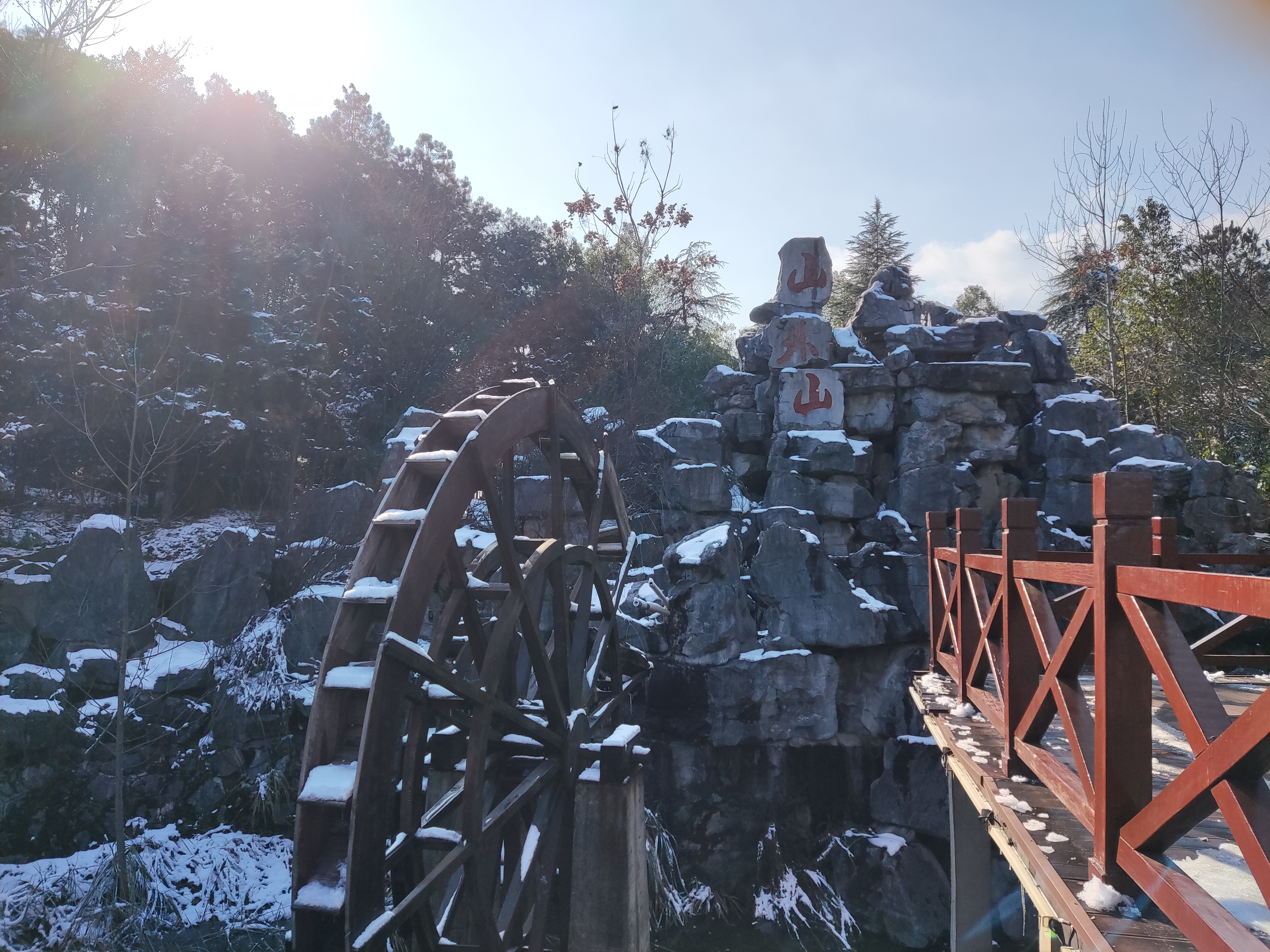
Zhaoyang Park (昭阳公园)

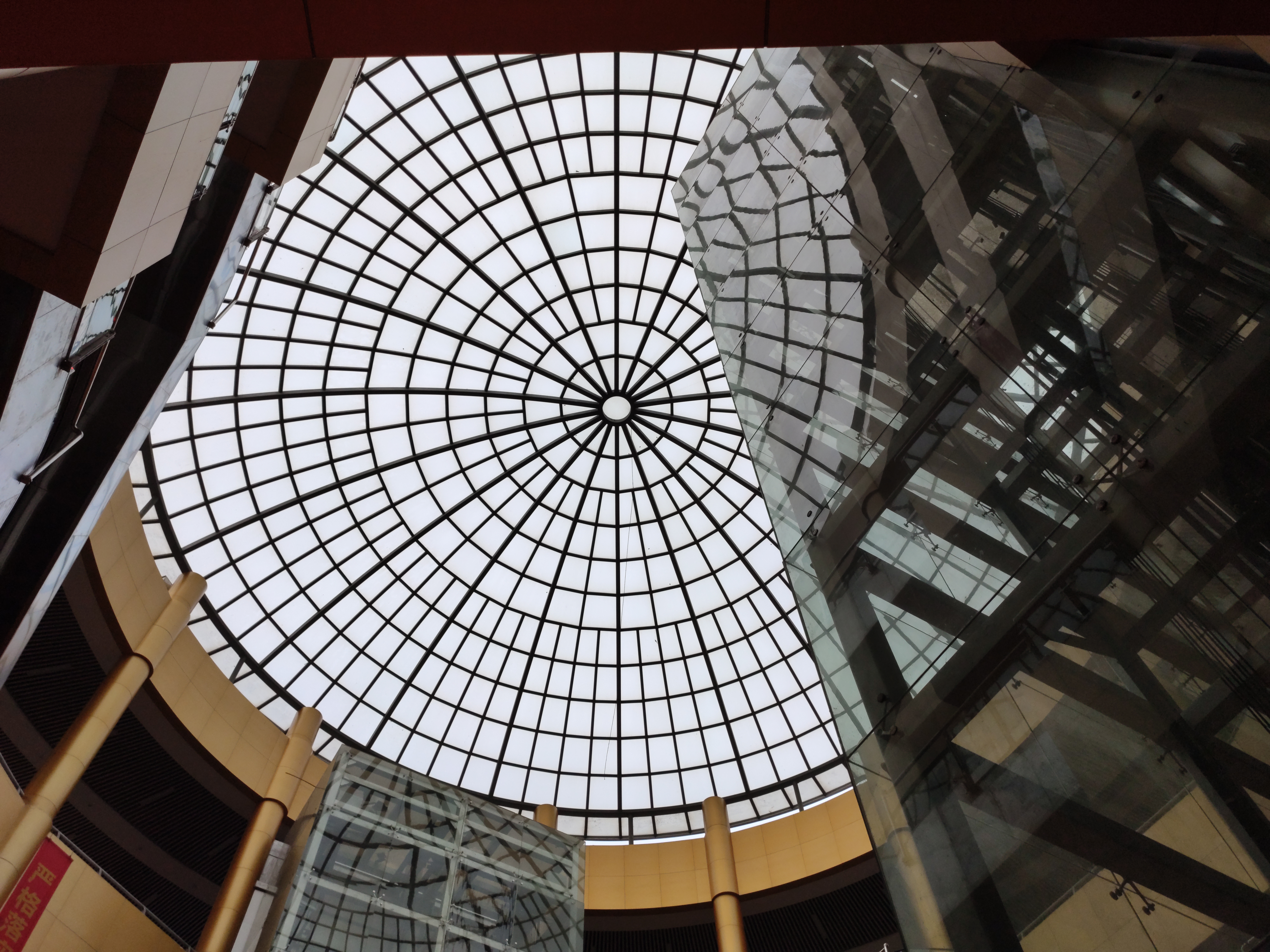
Shaodong International Trade City (邵东国际商贸城)

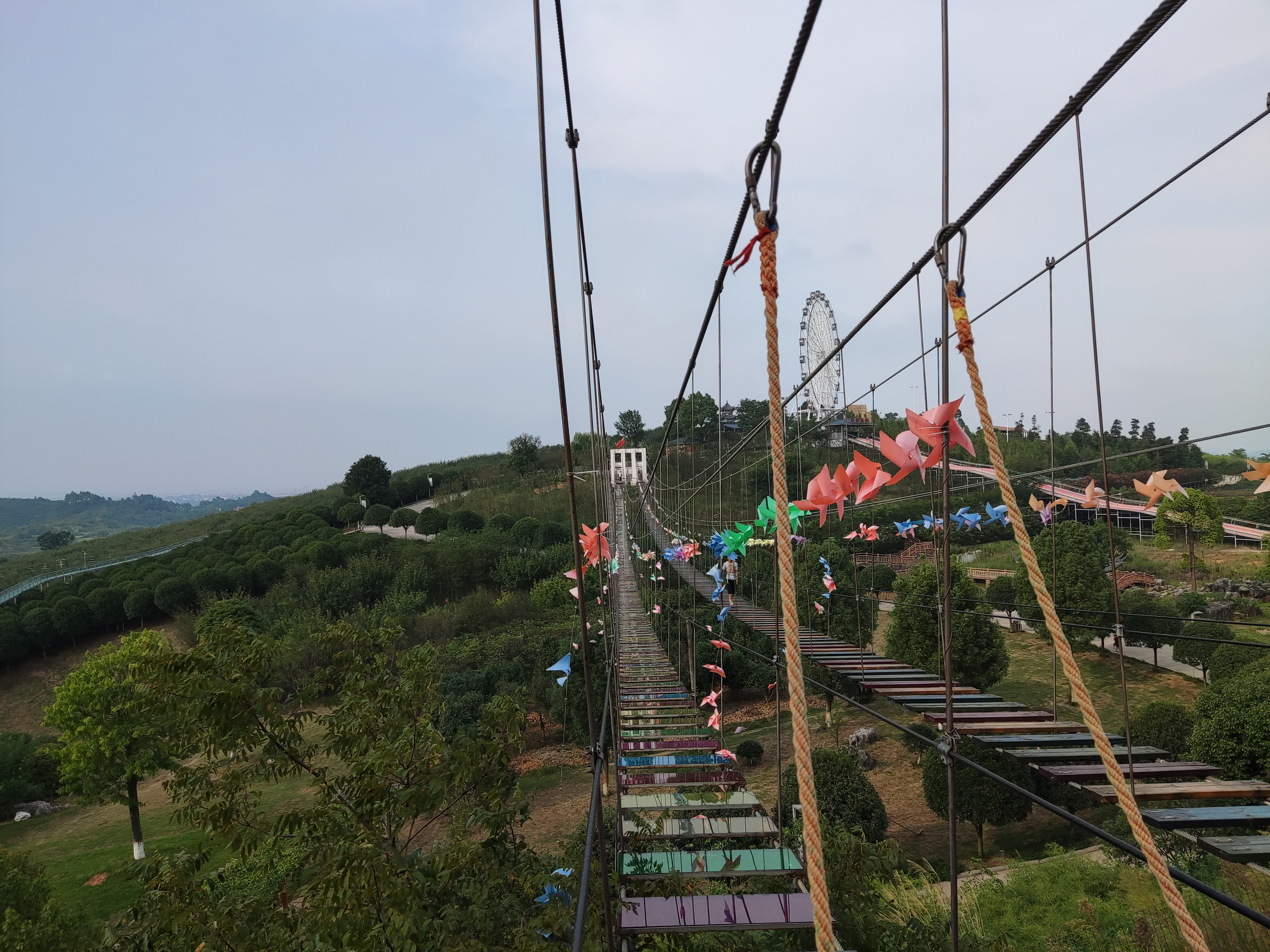
Yihui Garden Resort (怡卉园度假景区)

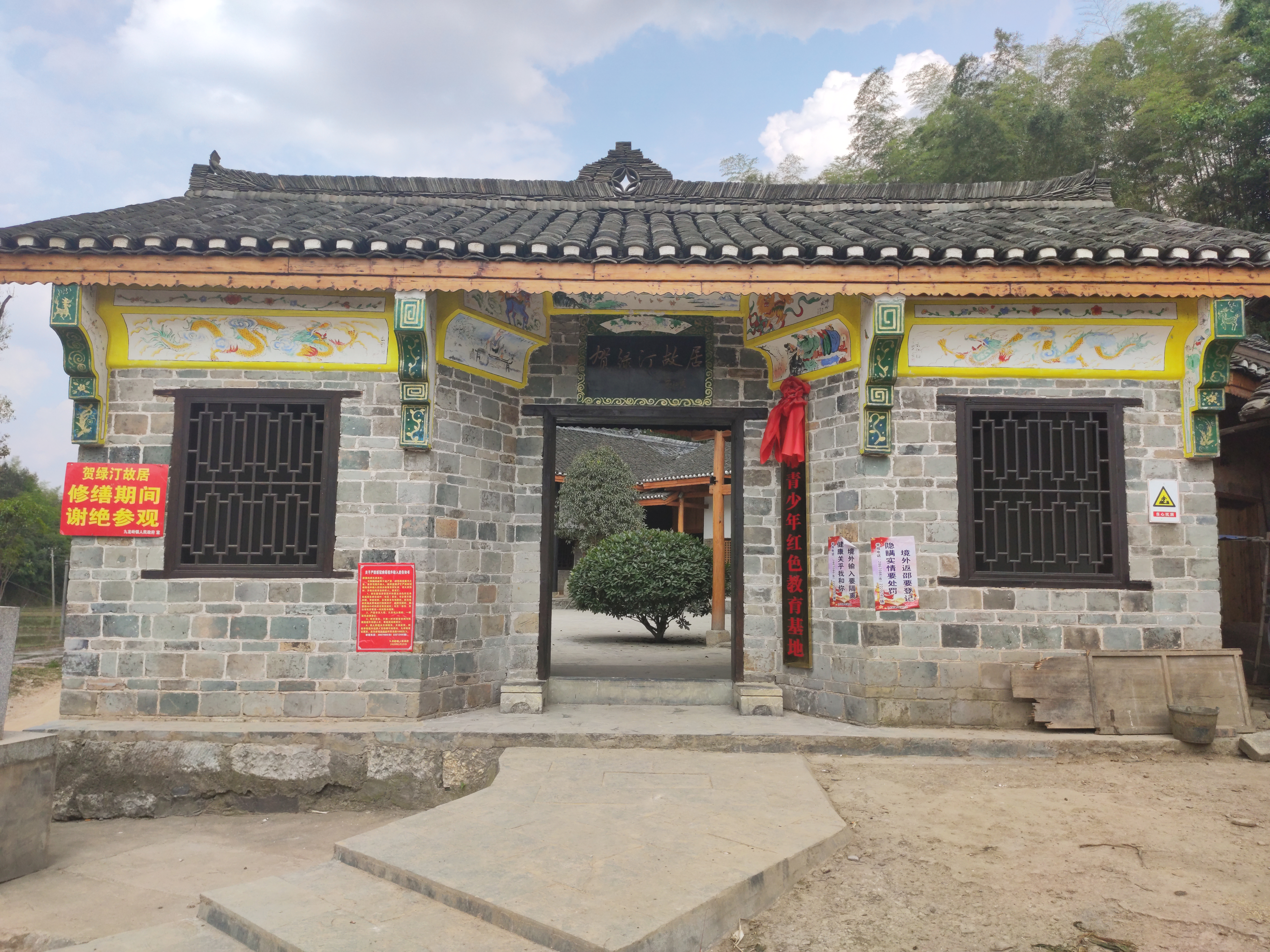
He Luting's Former Residence (贺绿汀故居)

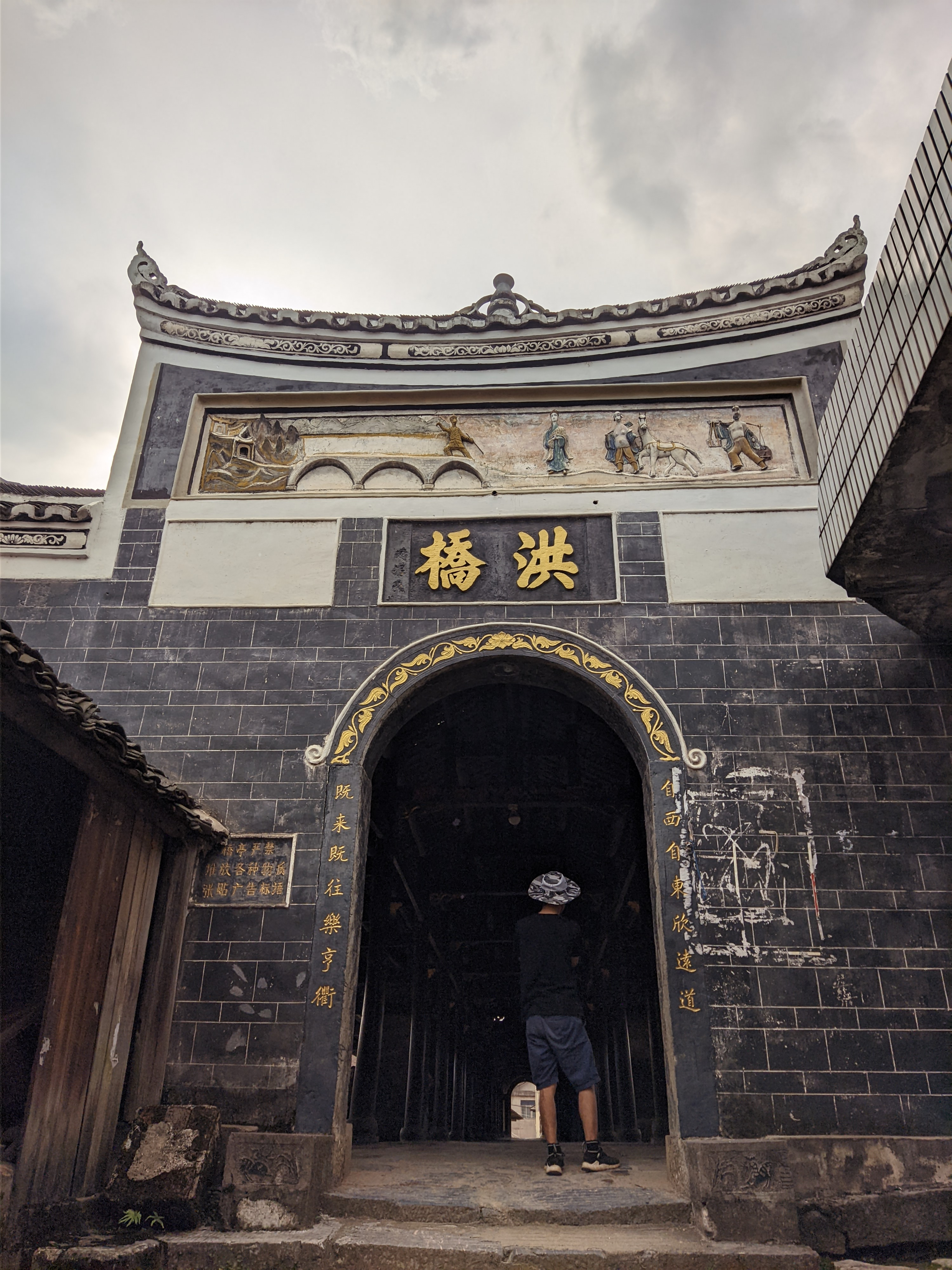
Hong Bridge (洪桥)

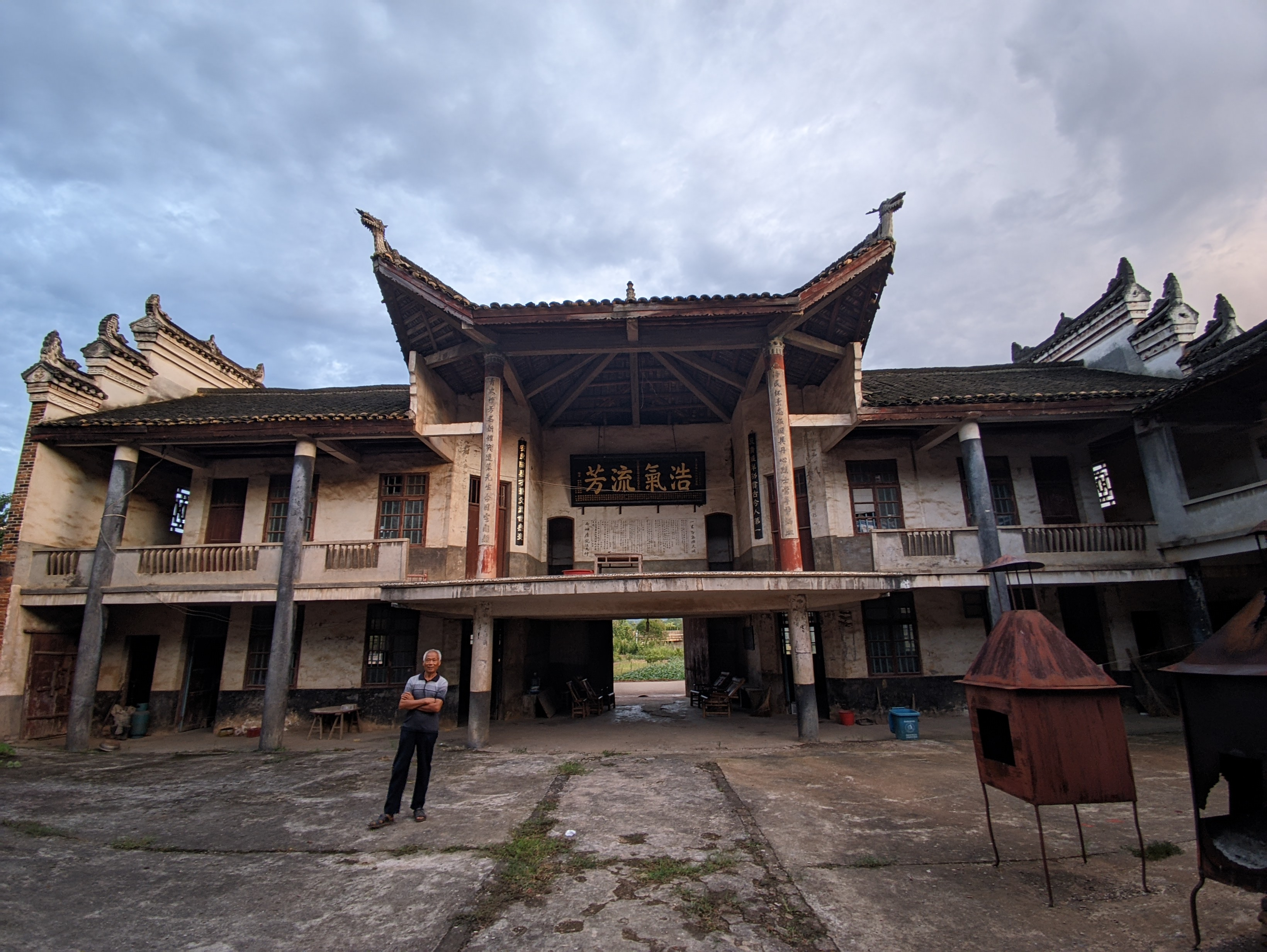
He Jinsheng Shrine (贺金声祠)

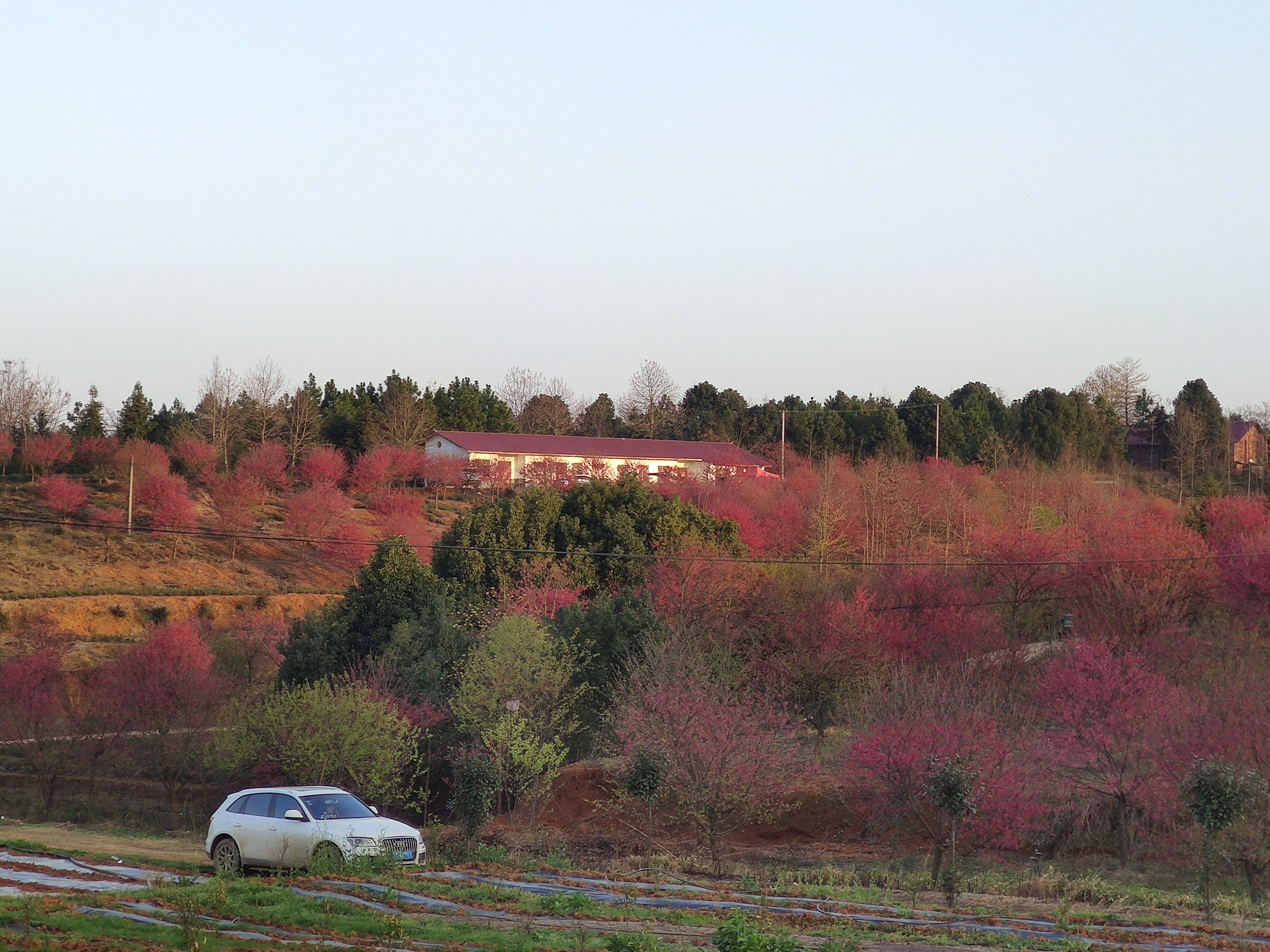
Shaodong Sakura Garden (樱花园)

=== Specialties ===
Shaodong long yellow daylily (邵东黄花菜), Shaodong yuzhu (邵东玉竹), Shaodong Zhuxue Ball (邵东猪血丸子), Shaodong Larou (邵东腊肉), Shaodong tea seed oil (邵东茶油), Shetianqiao Tofu (佘田桥豆腐), Shetianqiao Water Chestnut (佘田桥荸荠).

== People ==
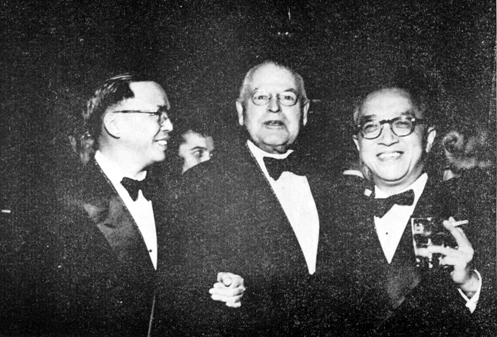
Tsiang Tingfu (left)

Tsiang Tingfu: He was an academician of the Academia Sinica, Ambassador of the Republic of China to the Soviet Union, Permanent Representative of the Republic of China to the United Nations, and Ambassador of the Republic of China to the United States.

Yin Chung-jung: He served as the Minister of the Ministry of Economic Affairs and Chairman of the Taiwan Bank. He was a key figure in stabilizing the Taiwanese economy in the 1950s and is honored as the "Father of Taiwanese Industry."

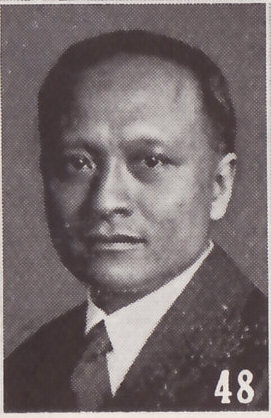
Franklin Ho

Franklin Ho: He was a pioneer in Chinese economics education, an academician of the Academia Sinica, and holder of a Ph.D. in economics from Yale University. He served as the Deputy Minister of the Ministry of Economic Affairs, Acting President of Nankai University, and Professor at Columbia University.

He Luting: He was a Chinese composer, music theorist, and music educator. He held honorary positions as the Chairman of the China Musicians Association and the Shanghai Musicians Association, as well as serving as the President of the Shanghai Conservatory of Music.

Yu Guang: A Chinese People's Liberation Army Lieutenant General, who once served as the President of the People's Liberation Army Daily, Director of the Political Department Propaganda Department of the General Political Department of the Chinese People's Liberation Army, and Deputy Political Commissar of the People's Liberation Army Rocket Force.

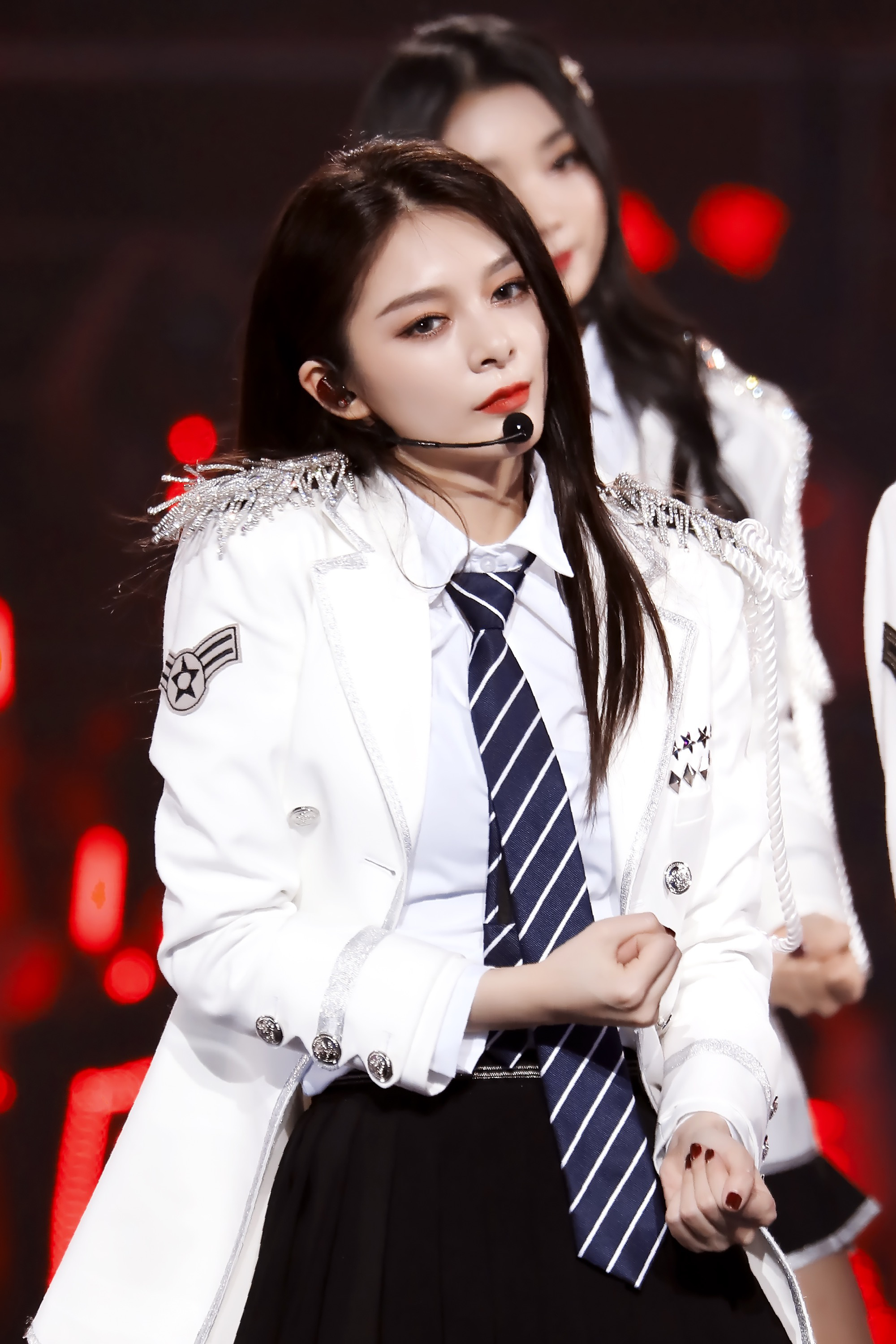
Fu Jing, a member of Rocket Girls 101

Fu Jing: a Chinese singer and actress. a member of Rocket Girls 101.

Allen Zhang: He is a Chinese computer programmer and technology executive. He is known for leading the developments of WeChat and Foxmail. He is a senior executive vice president and president of Weixin Group at Tencent Holdings Limited.
