= Shuangfeng, Shaodong =

Shuangfeng Township 双凤乡
- Township
- Location in Hunan
- Coordinates: 27°04′59″N 111°43′13″E
- Country: China
- Province: Hunan
- Prefecture-level city: Shaoyang
- County-level city: Shaodong

Area
  - Total: 55.77 km^{2} (21.53 sq mi)

Population (2017)
  - Total: 14,378
  - Density: 257.8/km^{2} (667.7/sq mi)
- Time zone: UTC+08:00 (China Standard)
- Postal code: 422804
- Area code: 0739

Chinese name
- Traditional Chinese: 雙鳳鄉
- Simplified Chinese: 双凤乡
Transcriptions
Standard Mandarin
- Hanyu Pinyin: Shuāngfèng Xiāng

Shuangfeng Township (Chinese: 双凤乡) is a township in Shaodong, Hunan, China. As of the 2017 census it had a population of 14,378 and an area of 55.77 square kilometres (21.53 sq mi). It borders the towns of Jiulongling and Xiancha in the north, Jianjialong Town in the east, Qidong County and Qiyang County in the south, and Shaoyang County in the west.

== History ==
Shuangfeng was incorporated as a township in 1956. In 1965 it was renamed "Shuangfeng People's Commune". In December 1979, it came under the jurisdiction of Lianyuan. In August 1983, it was under the administration of Shaodong County. It was restored as a township in 1984.

== Administrative divisions ==
As of 2015, the township is divided into twenty-five villages:

- Dongnan (东南村)
- Liujia (刘家村)
- Ma'an (马安村)
- Haiping (海坪村)
- Qinfu (勤富村)
- Dachong (大冲村)
- Fu'an (福安村)
- Guqi (古奇村)
- Qilin (麒麟村)
- Hongma (红马村)
- Chuanxing (船形村)
- Dajin (大进村)
- Shuangfeng (双凤村)
- Fengxing (凤形村)
- Yongjiu (永久村)
- Zhonghe (中和村)
- Yingfeng (迎丰村)
- Yuejin (跃胜村)
- Jinlong (金龙村)
- Yuqing (余庆村)
- Fuxing (复兴村)
- Shuijing (水井村)
- Xiangfu (香馥村)
- Caojia (曹家村)
- Daxing (大兴村)

== Geography ==
There are eight reservoirs in the township.

== Economy ==
The local economy is primarily based upon agriculture and local industry. The main fruits are walnut, grapefruit, pear, and peach. The township is rich in Dolomite.

== Attractions ==
Qidanling Karst Cave Group (七担岭溶洞群) are famous scenic spots in Shaodong.

Sandu Reservoir (三都水库) open to visitors for free. Fishing and hiking are activities around the lake.
