= Zeng =

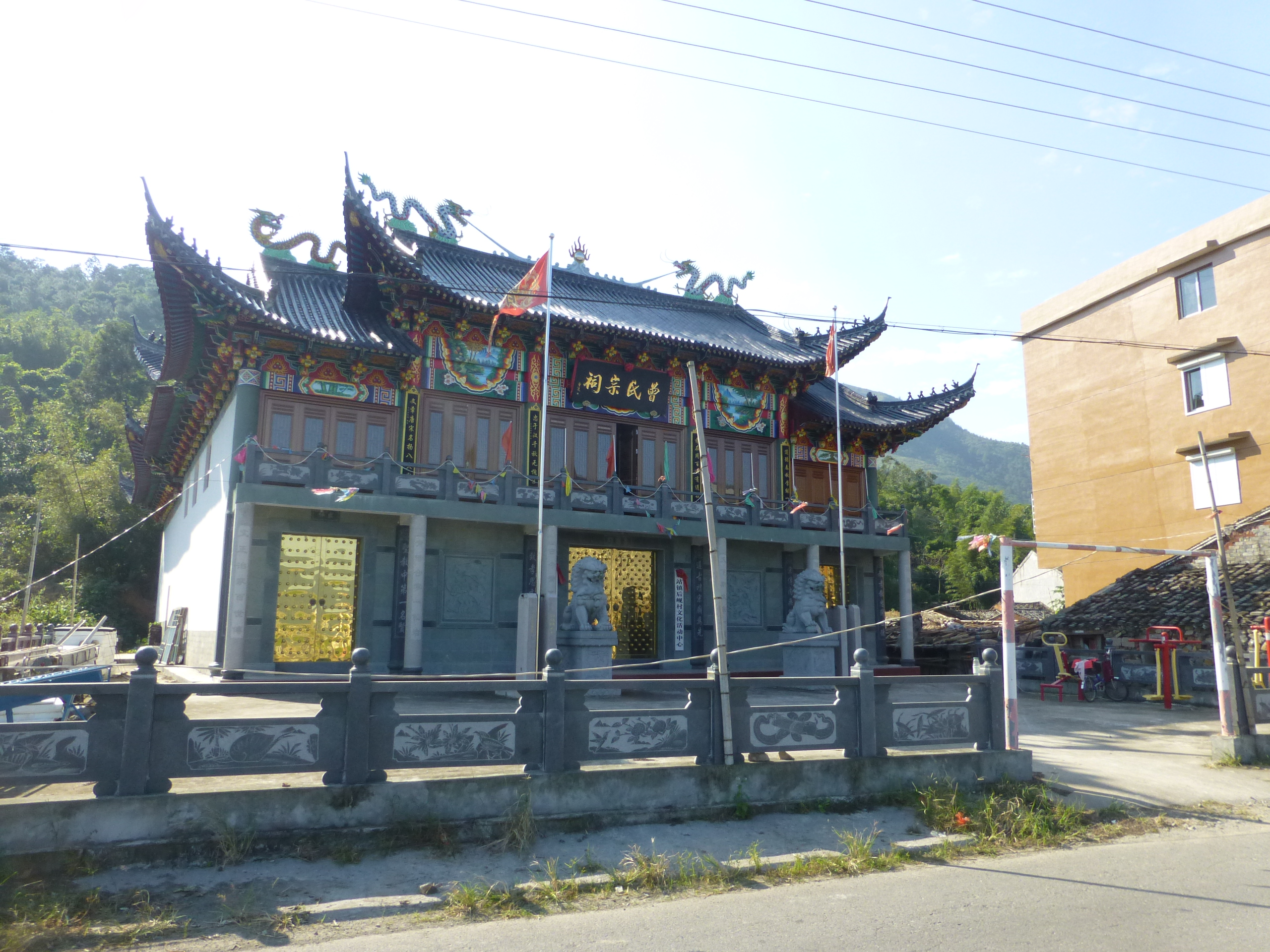
Zeng family ancestral temple, in Houxian Village, Mazhan Town, Cangnan County, Zhejiang

Zeng ([tsə́ŋ], Chinese: 曾; pinyin: Zēng; Wade–Giles: Tseng; Jyutping: Zang^{1}; Pe̍h-ōe-jī: Chêng / Chn̂g / Cheng / Chan) is a Chinese family name. In Cantonese, it is Tsang; In Wade–Giles, such as those in Taiwan, Tseng or Tzeng; in Malaysia and Singapore, Tsen, Chen or Cheng; in Thailand, Chang; in the Philippines, Chan; in Indonesia, Tjan; in Vietnam, Tăng. The surname Zeng is the 32nd most common surname in mainland China as of 2019. It is the 16th most common surname in Taiwan. It meant "high" or "add" in ancient Chinese. Zeng was listed 385th on the Hundred Family Surnames.

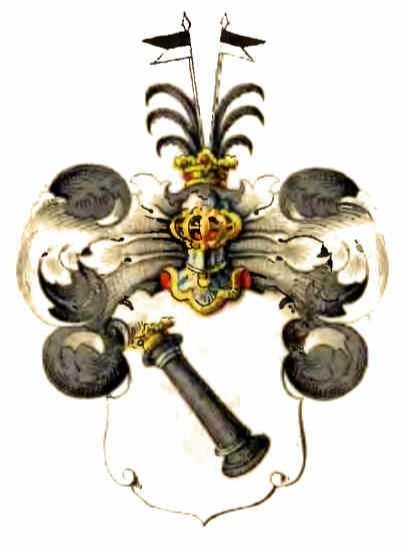
Family coat of arms of the German noble family von Zenge

Zeng or von Zeng is also a German family name with other origins f.e. the nobles De Zeng or von Zenge.

== Origin ==
The surname originates from (Chinese: 鄫; pinyin: Céng) an ancient state located in present-day Cangshan County (now Lanling County) in Shandong province, which was granted to Qu Lie, son of the emperor Shao Kang in the Xia dynasty. The state was annexed by Ju (located mainly in present-day Shandong province) in 567 BC. The crown prince of the state, Wu, fled to Lu. He later dropped the radical in the character and adopted 曾 as his surname.

== Generation Character ==
The Generation name character usually refers to the middle Character of the Chinese Name of a Zeng, and is used to determine the generation and clan a Zeng belongs to.

=== Generation Character Order ===
The Generation Character for Zeng from the 63rd Generation to the 97th Generation are as follows:

==== 63rd to 67th Generation (Given in Year 1400) ====
Hong, Wen, Zhen, Shang and Yan

==== 68th to 77th Generation (Set in Year 1628) ====
Xing, Yu, Chuan, Ji, Guang, Zhao, Xian, Qing, Fan and Xiang

==== 78th to 87th Generation (Set in Year 1863) ====
Ling, De, Wei, Chui, You, Qin, Shao, Nian, Xian and Yang

==== 88th to 97th Generation (Set in Year 1870) ====
Jian, Dao, Dun, An, Ding, Mao, Xiu, Zhao, Yi, Zhang, Yi, Wen, Huan, Jing, Rui, Yong, Xi, Shi, Xu, Chang

== Notable people ==
=== Chan ===
- James Chan Soon Cheong (曾順祥; 1926–2023), Malaysian Roman Catholic bishop
- Jose Mari L. Chan (曾煥福; born 1945), Filipino singer-songwriter
- Chris Chan (曾成兴; born 1950), Singaporean sports administrator
- Chan Soo Sen (曾士生; born 1956), Singaporean politician
- Soo K. Chan (曾仕乾; born 1962), Singaporean architect
- Chan Kwok Fai (曾國琿; born 1982), Malaysian singer
- Dinah Chan (曾秀卿; born 1986), Singapore road cyclist
- Jasper Chan (曾羽辉; born 1988), Singaporean footballer
- Chan Kwong Beng (曾廣銘; born 1988), Malaysian badminton player
- Chan Boon Yong (曾文勇), Malaysian diamantaire
- Jannie Chan (曾秀丽), Singaporean luxury retail businesswoman
- Priscelia Chan (曾詩梅), Singaporean actress
- Chan Tien Ghee (曾長義), Malaysian businessman
- Chan Ming Kai (曾敏凱; born 1980), Malaysian politician
- Chan Wei Beng Johnny Nimrod (曾伟明; born 1980), Singaporean Entrepreneur

=== Chang ===
- Gini Chang (曾曉晴; born 1994), Singapore-based Macanese actress and TV host

=== Chen ===
- Chen Lip Keong (曾立强; 1948–2023), Malaysian businessman and entrepreneur
- Chen Man Hin (曾敏兴; 1924–2022), Chinese-born Malaysian politician and physician
- Michael Chen Wing Sum (曾永森; 1932–2024), Malaysian politician
- Andrew Chen Kah Eng (曾笳恩; born 1975), Malaysian politician

=== Jung ===
- Leena Jung (曾莉娜; born 1959), Thai businesswoman, entrepreneur, politician, television host, influencer and actress
- Rutricha Phapakithi (née Apitchaya Sae-Jung, 曾西施; born 1999), Thai actress and singer

=== Tjan ===
- Bosco Tjan (曾学锋; 1966–2016), Chinese American psychologist, neuroscientist, professor
- Tjan Kok Hui (曾国辉; Djoko Tjandra; born 1951), Indonesian businessman and corruption felon
- Tjan So Gwan (曾素光; Maria Fransisca; born 1959), Indonesian badminton player
- Tjan Tjoe Som (曾珠森; 1903–1969), Indonesian sinologist, professor, translator

=== Tsang ===
- Bowie Tsang (曾寶儀; born 1973), Taiwanese television host, singer, actress, and writer
- Derek Tsang (曾國祥; born 1979), Hong Kong filmmaker and actor
- Donald Tsang (曾蔭權; born 1944), former Chief Executive of Hong Kong
- Edward Tsang, British emeritus professor of computer science
- Eric Tsang (曾志偉; born 1953), Hong Kong actor and film director
- Jasper Tsang (曾鈺成; born 1947), former President of the Legislative Council of Hong Kong
- Tsang Tsou-choi (曾灶財; 1921–2007), Hong Kong graffiti artist known as the "King of Kowloon"
- Tsang Yam-pui (曾蔭培; born 1946), former Commissioner of Police of Hong Kong

=== Tsen ===
- Chiungtze C. Tsen (曾炯之; 1898–1940), Chinese mathematician
- Linda Tsen (曾道玲; born 1956), Malaysian politician

=== Tseng ===
- Tseng Chun-hsin (曾俊欣; born 2001), Taiwanese tennis player
- Tseng Chung-ming (曾中明; died 2015), Taiwanese physician and politician, former Deputy Minister of Health and Welfare of the Republic of China
- Tseng Hua-te (曾華德; Tjivuluan Paracasaw; born 1957), Taiwanese Paiwan politician
- Tseng Jen-ho (曾仁和; born 1994), Taiwanese professional baseball player
- Tseng Jing-hua (曾敬驊; born 1997), Taiwanese actor
- Tseng Jing-ling (曾金陵; born 1947), Taiwanese politician, former Minister of the Veterans Affairs Commission of the Republic of China
- Tseng Kwong Chi (曾廣智; 1950–1990), Hong Kong-born American photographer
- Tseng Ming-chung (曾銘宗; born 1959), Taiwanese politician
- Muna Tseng, American dancer and choreographer
- Paul Tseng (曾匀; 1959–missing), Taiwanese-born American-Canadian applied mathematician
- Pets Tseng (曾沛慈; born 1984), Taiwanese singer and actress
- Sam Tseng (曾國城; born 1968), Taiwanese television host and actor
- Tseng Sheng-guang (曾聖光; Singcyang Diway; 1997–2022), Taiwanese army veteran, Ukrainian Foreign Legion soldier
- Tseng Shu-cheng (曾旭正), Taiwanese politician, current Deputy Minister of National Development Council of the Republic of China
- Tseng Tai-lin (曾台霖; born 1982), Taiwanese football coach and former player
- Tseng Wen-hui (曾文惠; born 1926), Taiwanese public figure, 4th First Lady of the Republic of China
- Tseng Wen-sheng (曾文生; born 1969), Taiwanese politician
- Tseng Wen-ting (曾文鼎; born 1984), Taiwanese basketball player
- Yani Tseng (曾雅妮; born 1989), Taiwanese professional golfer
- Tseng Yu-ho (曾佑和; 1924–2017), American art historian
- Tseng Yung-chuan (曾永權; born 1947), Taiwanese politician
- Tseng Yung-fu (曾勇夫; born 1943), Taiwanese politician, former Minister of Justice of the Republic of China
- Zine Tseng (曾靖; born 1994), Taiwanese actress

=== Tzeng ===
- Alice Tzeng (曾愷玹; born 1984), Taiwanese actress
- Jung-Ying Tzeng (曾仲瑩), Taiwanese-American statistician
- Ovid Tzeng (曾志朗; born 1944), Taiwanese politician
- Tzeng Chin-fa (曾進發), Taiwanese photographer
- Tzeng Shing-Kwei (曾興魁; 1946–2021), Taiwanese composer

=== Zeng ===
- Zengzi (曾参; 505–435 BC), Chinese philosopher and disciple of Confucius
- Zeng Baosun (曾寶蓀; 1893–1978), Chinese feminist, historian, Christian educator
- Zeng Bing (曾兵), Chinese engineer
- Zeng Cheng (曾诚; born 1987), Chinese professional footballer
- Zeng Chengwei (曾成偉; born 1958), Chinese musician of the guqin
- Zeng Fanbo (曾凡博; born 2003), Chinese professional basketball player
- Zeng Fanren (曾繁仁; born 1941), former president of Shandong University
- Zeng Fanzhi (曾梵志; born 1964), Chinese contemporary artist
- Zeng Gong (曾巩; 1019–1083), Chinese essayist, historian, poet, politician, writer
- Zeng Gongliang (曾公亮; 998–1078), Chinese scholar of the Song dynasty
- Zeng Guang (曾光; born 1946), Chinese epidemiologist
- Zeng Guofan (曾国藩; 1811–1872), Chinese politician and military commander
- Zeng Guoqiang (曾国强; born 1965), Chinese weightlifter, Olympic gold medalist
- Zeng Guoquan (曾国荃; 1824–1890), Chinese official and military leader of the late Qing dynasty
- Zeng Guoyuan (曾国原; 1953–2019), Singaporean businessman and perennial candidate
- Zeng Huifen (曾慧芬; born 1962), Singaporean actress
- Jenny Zeng (曾玉), Chinese entrepreneur and venture capitalist
- Zeng Jian (曾尖; born 1996), Singaporean table tennis player
- Zeng Jianhang (曾建航; born 1998), Chinese hurdler
- Zeng Jinlian (曾金莲; 1964–1982), tallest woman verified in modern times
- Zeng Jing (曾鲸; 1564–1647), Chinese painter
- Zeng Jing (Qing dynasty) (曾靜, 1679–1736), Chinese official
- Zeng Jingsheng (曾景生; born 1954), Chinese oil painter
- Zeng Jinyan (曾金燕; born 1983), Chinese blogger and human rights activist
- Zeng Jize (曾紀澤; 1839–1890), Chinese diplomat
- Zeng Junchen (曾俊臣; 1888–1964), Chinese businessman and opium kingpin
- Zeng Liansong (曾联松; 1917–1999), designer of the national flag of the People's Republic of China
- Zeng Meihuizi (曾美慧孜; born 1988), Chinese actress and film director
- Zeng Peiyan (曾培炎; born 1938), Chinese politician
- Zeng Qiliang (曾启亮; born 1975), Chinese retired breaststroke swimmer
- Zeng Qinghong (曾庆红; born 1939), Chinese retired politician, former Vice President of China
- Zeng Qinghong (曾庆红; born 1962), Chinese politician
- Zeng Rong (曾嵘), Chinese biochemist
- Zeng Rongsheng (曾融生; 1924–2019), Chinese geophysicist
- Zeng Shan (曾山; 1899–1972), Chinese politician
- Zeng Shiqiang (曾仕強; 1934–2018), Chinese-born Taiwanese sinologist
- Zeng Shunxi (曾舜晞; born 1997), Chinese actor and singer
- Zeng Tao (曾涛; born 1993), Chinese rower
- Zeng Wenhui (曾文蕙; born 2005), Chinese street skateboarder
- Zeng Xian (曾铣; 1499–1548), Ming dynasty general
- Zeng Xianyi (曾宪义; 1936–2011), Chinese legal scholar
- Zeng Xianzhi (曾宪植; 1910–1989), Chinese revolutionary and politician
- Zeng Xing (曾醒; 1882—1954), Chinese politician
- Zeng Xueming (曾雪明; Tăng Tuyết Minh; 1905–1991), Chinese midwife, undisclosed wife of Hồ Chí Minh
- Zeng Yanfen (曾艳芬; born 1991), Chinese singer and actress, former member of SNH48
- Zeng Yangfu (曾憲浩; 1898–1969), Chinese-born politician
- Zeng Yaozhang (曾耀樟; born 2004), Chinese footballer
- Zeng Yi (painter) (曾毅; born 1957), Chinese oil painter
- Zeng Yi (singer) (曾毅; born 1973), Chinese singer
- Zeng Yi (virologist) (曾毅; 1929–2020), Chinese virologist
- Zeng Yike (曾轶可; born 1990), Chinese singer
- Zeng Yingying (曾莹莹; born 1993), Chinese breakdancer
- Zeng Yong (曾勇; born 1963), Chinese academic
- Zeng Yongquan (曾涌泉; 1902–1996), Chinese diplomat
- Zeng Zhaolun (曾昭抡; 1899–1967), Chinese chemist and politician
- Zeng Zhaoyu (曾昭燏; 1909–1964), Chinese archaeologist, museologist, politician
- Zhe Zeng (曾喆; 1972–2001), Chinese American banker, 9/11 victim

== See also ==
- Chinese name
- Tomb of Marquis Yi of Zeng
