= Yongfeng =

Yongfeng (unless otherwise indicated, Chinese: t 永豐, s 永丰, p Yǒngfēng, lit. "ever-abundant") may refer to:

- SS Zhongshan, ex-Yongfeng, a Chinese gunboat

== Locations in China ==
Counties (永丰县), also known as Yongfengxian

- Yongfeng County, Jiangxi

Towns (永丰镇), also known as Yongfengzhen

- Yongfeng, Tianchang, Anhui
- Yongfeng, Chongqing, Zhong County, Chongqing
- Yongfeng, Gansu, Liangzhou District, Wuwei, Gansu
- Yongfeng, Guangdong, Deqing County, Guangdong
- Yongfeng, Qinggang County, Qinggang County, Suihua, Heilongjiang
- Yongfeng, Shuangfeng, Shuangfeng County, Loudi, Hunan
- Yongfeng, Jiangsu, Xinghua, Jiangsu
- Yongfeng, Luonan County, Shaanxi
- Yongfeng, Weinan, Pucheng County, Shaanxi
- Yongfeng, Yunnan, Zhaoyang District, Zhaotong, Yunnan
- Yongfeng, Zhejiang in Linhai, Zhejiang

Townships (永丰乡), also known as Yongfengxiang

- Yongfeng Township, in Huangshan District, Huangshan City, Anhui
- Yongfeng Township, in Xiangcheng City, Henan
- Yongfeng Township, Changde, Li County, Hunan
- Yongfeng Township, Rucheng County, Hunan
- Yongfeng Township, Xingguo County, Jiangxi
- Yongfeng Township, Jiuzhaigou County, Sichuan
- Yongfeng Township, Shunqing District, Nanchong, Sichuan
- Yongfeng Township, Zhongjiang County, Sichuan
- Yongfeng Township, Ürümqi County, Xinjiang
- Yongfeng Korean Ethnic Township, Chengzihe District, Jixi, Heilongjiang

Subdistricts (永丰街道)

- Yongfeng Subdistrict, Guangfeng County, Jiangxi
- Yongfeng Subdistrict, Juye County, Shandong
- Yongfeng Subdistrict, Shanghai, Songjiang District, Shanghai
- Yongfeng Road Subdistrict (永丰路街道), Renqiu, Hebei
- Yongfeng Subdistrict, Hanyang District, Wuhan, Hubei

Villages

- Yongfeng, Wanquan, Wanquan, Honghu, Jingzhou, Hubei

Islands

- Yongfengsha (永丰沙), a former name of an island since merged into Chongming near Shanghai

== See also ==
- Yongfeng station (disambiguation)
