= Zeng Yi =

Zeng Yi, may refer to:

- Yi Zeng (AI researcher), Chinese AI researcher.
- Zeng Yi (singer), Chinese singer.
- Zeng Yi (painter), Chinese painter.
- Zeng Yi (virologist), Chinese virologist.
