= Gantang, Shuangfeng =

Gantang Town 甘棠镇
- Town
- Location in Hunan.
- Coordinates: 27°26′26″N 111°58′01″E
- Country: People's Republic of China
- Province: Hunan
- Prefecture-level city: Loudi
- County: Shuangfeng

Area
  - Total: 133.8 km^{2} (51.7 sq mi)

Population (2018)
  - Total: 89,000
  - Density: 670/km^{2} (1,700/sq mi)
- Time zone: UTC+8 (China Standard)
- Postal code: 417703
- Area code: 0738

Gantang Town (simplified Chinese: 甘棠镇; traditional Chinese: 甘棠鎮; pinyin: Gāntáng Zhèn) is a rural town in Shuangfeng County, Hunan Province, People's Republic of China. As of the 2018 census it had a population of 89,000 and an area of 133.8-square-kilometre (51.7 sq mi). It is surrounded by Jinshi Town of Lianyuan on the northwest, Zhuoshicao Township of Shaodong County on the southwest, and Santangpu Town and Yintang Township on the southeast.

== History ==
It was upgraded to a town in 1994.

== Administrative divisions ==
The town is divided into 83 villages and one community, which include the following areas: Gantang Community, Qishi Village, Shanfeng Village, Changchong Village, Caijia Village, Wulin Village, Luzitang Village, Shanjing Village, Fengshu Village, Shanzhou Village, Shandou Village, Citangwan Village, Xiping Village, Sulin Village, Liujia Village, Songjia Village, Yanjing Village, Zaishuping Village, Xinyang Village, Miyang Village, Daji Village, Long'an Village, Jinshi Village, Bailongtan Village, Tanshangjiang Village, Heping Village, Fumushan Village, Jingtang Village, Gantang Village, Ningjia Village, Huqiao Village, Liujiachong Village, shengeng Village, Tanjiang Village, Yangshu Village, Shilong Village, Bajiaochong Village, Ganchong Village, Bayi Village, Yanmen Village, Longji Village, Sanbaqiao Village, Saitian Village, Shuangjian Village, Kuangjiachong Village, Tianxin Village, Longsi Village, Shuangzhou Village, Dafu Village, Dashi Village, Jiaxiang Village, Xianghua Village, Luojia Village, Tongjia Village, Bajiao Village, Mupai Village, Hubian Village, Liangfeng Village, Jiecao Village, Qingshan Village, Shidong Village, Xiangyang Village, Yanglin Village, Jingfu Village, Caolin Village, Shitangbian Village, Changchongping Village, Tangdi Village, Erbushan Village, Jinhua Village, Jinjia Village, Luobaichong Village, Longtuan Village, Wangxing Village, Xingwu Village, Nanchong Village, Yangcang Village, Yuejin Village, Shuangzhong Village, Huxichong Village, Heye Village, and Caolu Village (甘棠社区、企石村、山峰村、长冲村、蔡家村、伍林村、桃林村、鲁子堂村、山井村、枫树村、山洲村、山斗村、祠堂湾村、西坪村、苏林村、刘家村、松家村、盐井村、栽树坪村、新阳村、密阳峰村、大吉村、龙安村、金石村、白龙潭村、潭上江村、和平村、茯木山村、井塘村、甘棠村、宁家村、湖桥村、刘家冲村、莘耕村、潭江村、仰书村、石龙村、双龙村、芭蕉冲村、甘冲村、八一村、岩门村、龙集村、三坝桥村、赛田村、双建村、匡家冲村、田心村、龙嘶村、双洲村、大富村、大石村、加祥村、香花村、罗家村、同家村、芭蕉村、木排村、虎边村、两峰村、接草村、青山村、石洞村、向阳村、杨林村、景福村、曹林村、石塘边村、长冲坪村、塘底村、二步山村、金华村、金家村、罗白冲村、龙团村、旺兴村、兴无村、南冲村、杨仓村、跃进村、双中村、湖禧冲村、荷叶村、曹路村)

== Geography ==
The Zhupo Mountains (Chinese: 猪婆大山) are located in the southwestern town.

== Economy ==
The town's economy is based on nearby mineral resources and agricultural resources. It's rich in coal mines. Watermelon and yam are the main cash crops.

== Transportation ==
The G60 Shanghai–Kunming Expressway is a northeast–southwest highway in the town.

The Loudi–Shaoyang railway runs north–south through the east of the town.
