= Zeng Zhaoyu =

Chinese archaeologist

- 曾昭燏
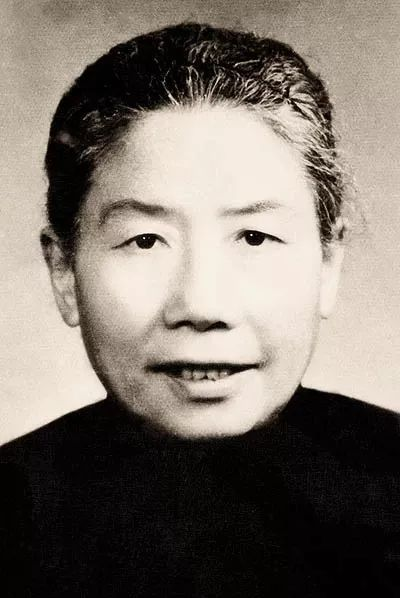
- Zeng Zhaoyu

President of Nanjing Museum
- In office 1955–1964
- Preceded by: Xu Pingyu
- Succeeded by: Yao Qian

Personal details
- Born: 27 January 1909 Heye Town, Shuangfeng County, Hunan, Qing Empire
- Died: 22 December 1964 (aged 55) Linggu Temple, Nanjing, Jiangsu, People's Republic of China
- Cause of death: Suicide
- Resting place: Mount Niushou (牛首山)
- Party: Jiusan Society
- Relations: Zeng Guohuang; Zeng Zhaocheng; Zeng Zhaolun; Zeng Zhaojie
- Parent(s): Zeng Guangzuo; Chen Jiying
- Education: National Central University; University of Nanking; University of London
- Occupation: Archaeologist, museologist, politician

Zeng Zhaoyu (Chinese: 曾昭燏; pinyin: Zēng Zhāoyù; 27 January 1909 – 22 December 1964), also known as Tseng Chao-yu in English, was a Chinese archaeologist, museologist, and politician who served as president of Nanjing Museum between 1955 and 1964.

She was a member of the 2nd and 3rd National Committee of the Chinese People's Political Consultative Conference and a deputy to the 3rd National People's Congress.

== Biography ==
Zeng was born in Heye Town of Shuangfeng County, Hunan, on 27 January 1909. Her great-grandfather Zeng Guohuang was the second younger brother of Zeng Guofan and a general in the Qing Empire. Her father Zeng Guangzuo (Chinese: 曾广祚) was an official in the Qing Empire. Her mother Chen Jiying (Chinese: 陈季) was the daughter of Hunan Provincial Governor Chen Baozhen and the aunt of Chen Yinke. She had seven brothers and sisters. Her eldest brother Zeng Zhaocheng (Chinese: 曾昭) graduated from Harvard University. Her second elder brother Zeng Zhaolun graduated from Massachusetts Institute of Technology and was an academician of the Chinese Academy of Sciences (CAS). Her third elder brother Zeng Zhaojie (Chinese: 曾昭杰) graduated from the Great China University.

In 1923 she attended the Yifang Girls' School in Changsha, which was established by her third elder female cousin Zeng Baosun (Chinese: 曾宝荪). In 1929 she was accepted to the National Central University, where she studied archaeology under Hu Xiaoshi (Chinese: 胡小石). In 1935, when she was a graduate student at the University of Nanking, she went to the University of London to study archaeology at her own expense. After graduation, she interned at the National Museum of Germany. After returning to China, she was assigned to the Central Museum. After the defeat of the Nationalists by the Communists in the Chinese Civil War in 1949, she chose to stay in mainland China.

In 1950, she was appointed vice-president of the Nanjing Museum. In 1951, during the Korean War, she donated all her savings to the Chinese government. In 1951, at the request of her superiors, she wrote an autobiography to proclaim her innocence. In December 1951, she was forced to work in the fields instead of working in the museum. In 1955, she was promoted to President of the Nanjing Museum. She joined the Jiusan Society in 1956 and subsequently served as a representative in several political bodies and organisations. In March 1964, Zeng Zhaoyue was admitted to a sanatorium for recuperation due to depression. On 22 December 1964, she jumped from the pagoda of Linggu Temple and died.

== Selected bibliography ==
- Zeng Zhaoyu; Li Ji (1943). 博物館 [Museums] (in Chinese). Chongqing: Cheng Chung Book Co.
- Zeng Zhaoyu; Jiang Baogeng; Li Zhongyi (1956). 沂南古画像石墓發掘報告 [Excavation report of the ancient stone-carved tombs in Yinan] (in Chinese). Beijing: Bureau of Cultural Relics Management, Ministry of Culture.
- Tseng Chao-Yu; Yin Huan-Chang (1959). "試論湖熟文化" [On the "Hushu culture"]. Acta Archaeologica Sinica (in Chinese) (4): 47–58.

Academic offices
Preceded by Xu Pingyu	President of Nanjing Museum; 1955–1964	Succeeded by Yao Qian
