= Zhang Gan =

Chinese general (1897–1959)

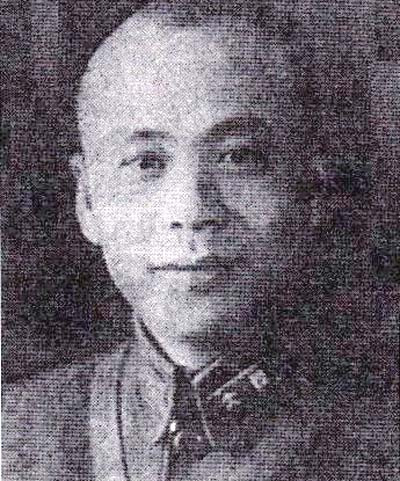
- Born: 17 September 1897; Guilin, Guangxi Province, Qing China
- Died: 21 February 1959 (aged 61) Beijing, China
- Allegiance: Republic of China
- Branch: National Revolutionary Army
- Service years: 1917–1949
- Rank: Lieutenant General
- Conflicts: Northern Expedition; Second Sino-Japanese War; Battle of Wuhan; Battle of Suixian-Zaoyang; Chinese Civil War; Guangxi Campaign; Bobai Campaign (surrendered)
- Awards: (see below)

Zhang Gan (simplified Chinese: 张淦; traditional Chinese: 張淦; pinyin: Zhāng Gàn; Wade–Giles: Cheng Kan) (17 September 1897 – 21 February 1959) was a Chinese military general in the National Revolutionary Army of the Republic of China (ROC). Zhang Gan fought in major battles of the Second Sino-Japanese War and later commanded the 3rd Corps during the Chinese Civil War. Captured by the People's Liberation Army in 1949, he died in prison in 1959.

== Early life ==
Of Hui ethnicity, Zhang was born on 17 September 1897 in Guilin. He studied in the second cohort of the Guangxi Army Accelerated Military School and was a contemporary of Li Zongren. After graduating, he served as an aide-de-camp in the forces of Lu Rongting of the Old Guangxi Clique. In May 1917, Zhang was assigned as an assistant company officer in the Army Model Battalion established in Nanning and among those who served with him was Bai Chongxi, who was also of Hui ethnicity, and Huang Shaohong. He later served in turn as a platoon leader and in the winter of 1918, the Model Battalion was reorganised into a Model Regiment, and Zhang was promoted to captain and appointed company commander.

== Military career ==
In 1924, he was promoted to battalion commander of the Guangxi Anti-Bandit Army and participated in the campaigns through which the New Guangxi Clique unified Guangxi. In October 1926, during the Northern Expedition, Zhang was appointed aide-de-camp at the headquarters of the National Revolutionary Army’s Seventh Army. In 1927, he was promoted to chief aide-de-camp of the Seventh Army.

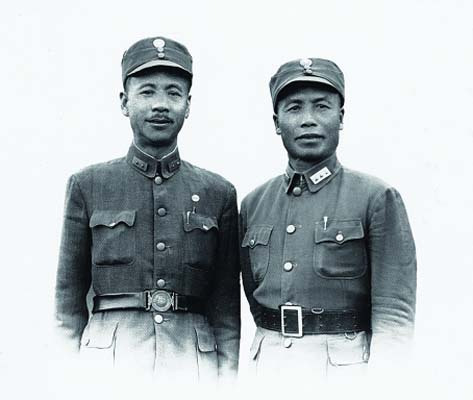
Zhang and Li Zongren

In 1929, Zhang Gan was appointed commander of the Guilin District Civilian Militia Headquarters in Guangxi. In September 1932, Yao communities in Guanyang and Quanzhou counties launched an uprising against local militia leader Jiang Chaomin. Zhang was ordered to go to Guanyang to suppress the rebels. Jiang Chaomin was arrested and executed. However, after rebel leaders were later detained by the authorities, further Yao uprisings broke out on a larger scale. In March 1933, serving under Liao Lei, Zhang led troops to the border area between Quanzhou and Guanyang. Following coordinated suppression operations by Guangxi forces, the uprising was crushed.

In November 1933, Zhang Gan was admitted to the 12th regular class of the Army University in Nanjing, graduating in December 1936. He later also studied at the 21st Party–Government Class of the Central Training Corps. After graduation, he was appointed Chief of Staff of the 48th Army.

=== Second Sino-Japanese War ===
After the outbreak of the Second Sino-Japanese War in July 1937, Zhang became Chief of Staff of the 20th Army Group under Liao Lei and participated in the Battle of Shanghai. On 21 June 1938, following the dismissal of General Zhou Zuhuang after the fall of Su County during operations around Xuzhou, Zhang was appointed commander of the 7th Army with the rank of lieutenant general. He remained in the Dabie Mountains conducting rear-area resistance operations and took part in the Battle of Wuhan. During this period, he supported cooperation between the Nationalists and Communists, and established a political and military training program in the Hubei–Anhui border region. In October 1938, Japanese forces attacked his headquarters in Luotian and as a result, he ordered defensive operations to cover the evacuation of military hospitals and wounded soldiers. The 7th Army subsequently remained stationed in the area, engaging Japanese forces in eastern Hubei.

In spring 1939, he participated in the Battle of Suixian–Zaoyang. On 13 November 1939, he was formally promoted to lieutenant general. Between March and April 1940, he took part in operations against the New Fourth Army in northern Hubei while serving under Li Pinxian in the Fifth War Zone. In July 1943, he was promoted to Deputy Commander of the 21st Army Group and participated in the Battle of South Henan.

Zhang was known for his strong belief in traditional divination practices, which earned him the nickname “Compass General” (罗盘将军). He reportedly carried a geomantic compass at all times and would not decide on daily matters, military campaigns and battlefield strategy without first consulting it.

=== Chinese civil war ===
In July 1946, Zhang was appointed Deputy Commander of the 8th Pacification Zone. In 1947, he became commander of the 3rd Rapid Column under the Army General Headquarters. In August 1948, he was appointed commander of the 3rd Corps. During this period, he served under Bai Chongxi in Central China and took part in operations in the Dabie Mountains against the Communist forces led by Liu Bocheng and Deng Xiaoping. After the Huaihai Campaign, Nationalist leader Chiang Kai-shek ordered Zhang's corps to reinforce Huang Wei’s surrounded forces, but Bai refused to redeploy him. In April 1949, Zhang Gan became Deputy Director of the Central China Military and Political Office. During the defense of Hengyang, he commanded the 3rd Corps and advocated an offensive strategy to defend the city, but the overall Nationalist position continued to deteriorate.

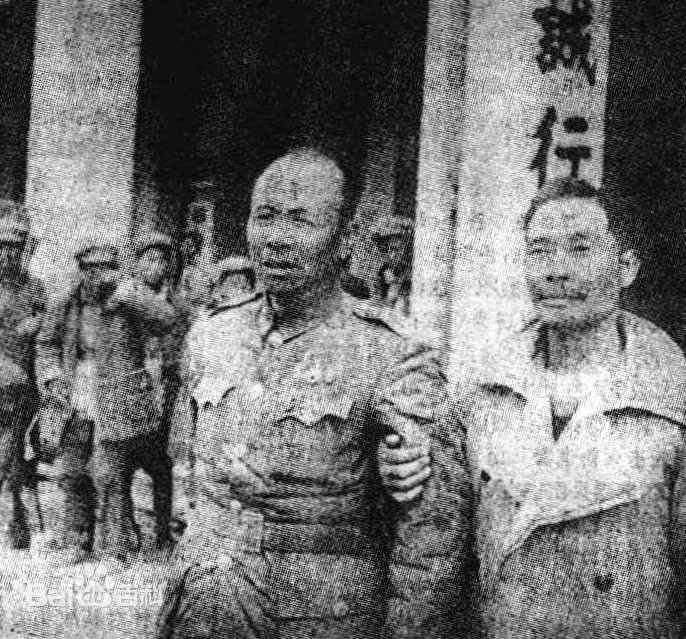
Zhang (left) following his capture by PLA forces in Guangxi (1949)

In August 1949, his forces fought in the Qingshuping area in Hunan and temporarily repelled advancing Communist troops. However, by October, Nationalist forces were in retreat and Zhang withdrew toward Guangxi. In November 1949, while retreating to Bobai in Guangxi, his corps was defeated by the People’s Liberation Army forces led by Lin Biao in the Bobai campaign. Zhang was captured and subsequently announced the surrender of his remaining forces. By 1 December 1949, the 3rd Corps had been completely destroyed.

== Later life ==
Following his capture by the People's Liberation Army in 1949, Zhang was transported to Beijing where he was held at the Beijing War Criminals Management Center. He died in detention on 21 February 1959, at the age 61.

== Awards and honors ==

Order of the Cloud and Banner, 4th class (1944)		Order of Loyalty and Diligence (1945)
War Memorial Medal (1946)	Medal of the Armed Forces, A-1	Medal of Brilliant Light, 1st class
