= Zeng Zhaolun =

Chinese chemist and politician

- 曾昭抡
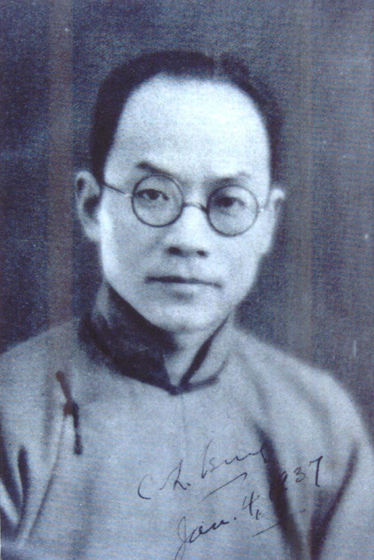
- Zeng Zhaolun in 1937

Vice-Minister of Education
- In office 1949–1957
- Minister: Ma Xulun

Personal details
- Born: May 25, 1899 Heye, Shuangfeng County, Hunan, Qing Empire
- Died: December 8, 1967 (aged 68) Beijing, China
- Party: China Democratic League
- Spouse: Yu Dayin
- Relations: Zeng Guohuang; Zeng Zhaocheng; Zeng Zhaojie; Zeng Zhaoyu
- Parent(s): Zeng Guangzuo; Chen Jiying
- Education: Tsinghua University; Massachusetts Institute of Technology
- Occupation: Chemist, politician

Chinese name
- Traditional Chinese: 曾昭掄
- Simplified Chinese: 曾昭抡
Transcriptions
Standard Mandarin
- Hanyu Pinyin: Zēng Zhāolún
- Wade–Giles: Tseng Chao-lun

Zeng Zhaolun (Chinese: 曾昭抡; 25 May 1899 – 8 December 1967), also known as Chao-Lun Tseng, was a Chinese chemist and politician who served as vice-minister of Education after the establishment of the Communist State in the 1950s. He was an academician of the Chinese Academy of Sciences (CAS).

== Biography ==
Zeng was born in Heye, Shuangfeng County, Hunan, on January 27, 1909. His great-grandfather Zeng Guohuang was the second younger brother of Zeng Guofan and a general in the Qing Empire. His father Zeng Guangzuo (Chinese: 曾广祚) was an official in the Qing Empire. His mother Chen Jiying (Chinese: 陈季瑛) was the daughter of Hunan Provincial Governor Chen Baozhen and the aunt of Chen Yinke. Zeng had seven brothers and sisters. His eldest brother Zeng Zhaocheng (Chinese: 曾昭承) graduated from Harvard University. His younger brother Zeng Zhaojie (Chinese: 曾昭杰) graduated from the Great China University. His younger sister Zeng Zhaoyu graduated from the University of London and was an archaeologist and museologist.

After graduating from Tsinghua University in 1920, he pursued graduate studies at the Massachusetts Institute of Technology in the United States. After returning to China, he taught at the National Central University. In 1931 he became a professor at Peking University. In the summer of 1946, Wu Ta-You, Zeng Zhaolun and Hua Luogeng visited the United States to inspect the manufacturing process of the atomic bomb. After the defeat of the Nationalists by the Communists in Chinese Civil War in 1949, he chose to stay in mainland China.

After the founding of the People's Republic of China, Zeng was appointed Vice Minister of Education. In 1957, Zeng was labeled as a rightist during the Anti-Rightist Campaign. In March 1958, he was transferred to Wuhan University as a teacher. When the Cultural Revolution began in 1966, Zeng was persecuted as one of "Zeng Guofan's descendants". On August 25, 1966, his wife Yu Dayin (Chinese: 俞大絪) committed suicide after being beaten and humiliated. On December 8, 1967, Zeng died of cancer at home.

== Personal life ==
Zeng's wife Yu Dayin (Chinese: 俞大絪) was a professor at the Department of English, Peking University, who was murdered by students during the Cultural Revolution.
