= Cheng Gang (National Revolutionary Army) =

Nationalist Chinese general

Cheng Gang (Chinese: 成刚; other spelling Chen Kiang, 18 February 1904 – 29 February 1964) was a general in the National Revolutionary Army who served during the Second Sino-Japanese War and the Chinese Civil War. He received the Order of the Cloud and Banner (Special Cravat) in 1945 and the Medal of Freedom from the United States in 1946. Cheng graduated from the Republic of China Military Academy (Whampoa Military Academy) in 1925. During his military career, he participated in several campaigns of the Chinese Civil War, including the Fourth Encirclement Campaign in 1932 and operations in Qingshuping in 1948.
