= Qizhang =

Qizhang may refer to:

== Place ==
- Qizhang metro station, a metro station of the Taipei Metro.
- Qizhang Village (七張里), a village in Yilan City, Yilan County, Taiwan.
- Qizhang Village (七帳村), a village in Shiniu Township, Shuangfeng County, Hunan Province, People's Republic of China.
- Saint John's Island, of which original Chinese name is Qizhangshan, an island in the Straits of Singapore.

== People ==
- Dung Kai-cheung (董啟章; Dong Qizhang), a Chinese-language fiction writer (born 1967).
- Qi Qizhang (戚其章), a history consultant.
- Yin Qizhang, a presidents of the Medical College of Soochow University (1983–1984).
- Niu Sengru, formally Duke Wenzhen of Qizhang, a prominent statesman (780 – 849).
- Wuzi of Han, whose born name Hán Qǐzhāng (韓啓章), is a ruler of Han (424 BC – 409 BC).
