= Fucha =

Fucha may refer to:

Antarctica

- Fucha Peak, named after the Bulgarian villages Mala and Gilema Fucha

Bulgaria

- Mala Fucha, village in Bobov Dol Municipality, Kyustendil Province
- Gilema Fucha, idem

Chile

- meaning "older man", in the Mapuche religion

China

- Fuchai or Fucha, King of Wu
- a village in Huamen, Shuangfeng, Hunan Province
- Fucha Township in Jiangxi Province
- Fucha Gui-ren a character in the television series Empresses in the Palace.
- Fucha Hengtai, main character in the Palace 3: The Lost Daughter television series

Colombia

- Fucha River, river of Bogotá
- Fucha (TransMilenio), TransMileno station named after the river

Japan

- Fucha Ryōri, vegetarian dish in the Japanese cuisine
- Imajinarī Fūchā, Japanese name of Da Capo II manga novel
- Fucha: The Other Side of the Melody, screenwritten by Hitomi Shiraishi

United States

- character in the Marielena telenovela
