= Jingzi, Shuangfeng =

Jingzi Town 井字镇
- Town
- Location in Hunan
- Coordinates: 27°28′06″N 112°25′09″E
- Country: People's Republic of China
- Province: Hunan
- Prefecture-level city: Loudi
- district: Shuangfeng County

Area
  - Total: 79.7 km^{2} (30.8 sq mi)

Population
  - Total: 36,000
  - Density: 450/km^{2} (1,200/sq mi)
- Time zone: UTC+8 (China Standard)
- Area code: 0738

Jingzi Town (simplified Chinese: 井字镇; traditional Chinese: 井字鎮; pinyin: Jǐngzì Zhèn) is an urban town in Shuangfeng County, Hunan Province, People's Republic of China.

== Administrative divisions ==
The town is divided into 36 villages and 1 community, which include the following areas: Guanshengdian Community, Fuxi Village, Songzhuang Village, Pingshi Village, Tongde Village, Zengfeng Village, Shiren Village, Wanli Village, Shiquan Village, Huangcao Village, Qiancheng Village, Liantang Village, Jingzi Village, Guanshu Village, Xinyun Village, Tongfeng Village, Tongle Village, Shiqi Village, Huaqiao Village, Huashan Village, Sanshi Village, Hongguang Village, Huangfeng Village, Shikou Village, Shuiwan Village, Fanggui Village, Zhangye Village, Zhushan Village, Shizuitou Village, Shiqiu Village, Yangqiu Village, Hongshan Village, Changwan Village, Guanzu Village, Chenjia Village, Yuexi Village, and Qiaomu Village (关圣殿社区、扶溪村、松庄村、坪石村、同德村、增峰村、世仁村、万里村、石泉村、黄巢村、前程村、莲塘村、井字村、观树村、新云村、同丰村、同乐村、石奇村、花桥村、花山村、三石村、红光村、黄峰村、石口村、水湾村、芳桂村、樟叶村、竹山村、石咀头村、石球村、杨球村、洪山村、长湾村、观祖村、陈家村、约溪村、乔木村).
