= Shuangfeng County No. 1 High School =

- 双峰县第一中学
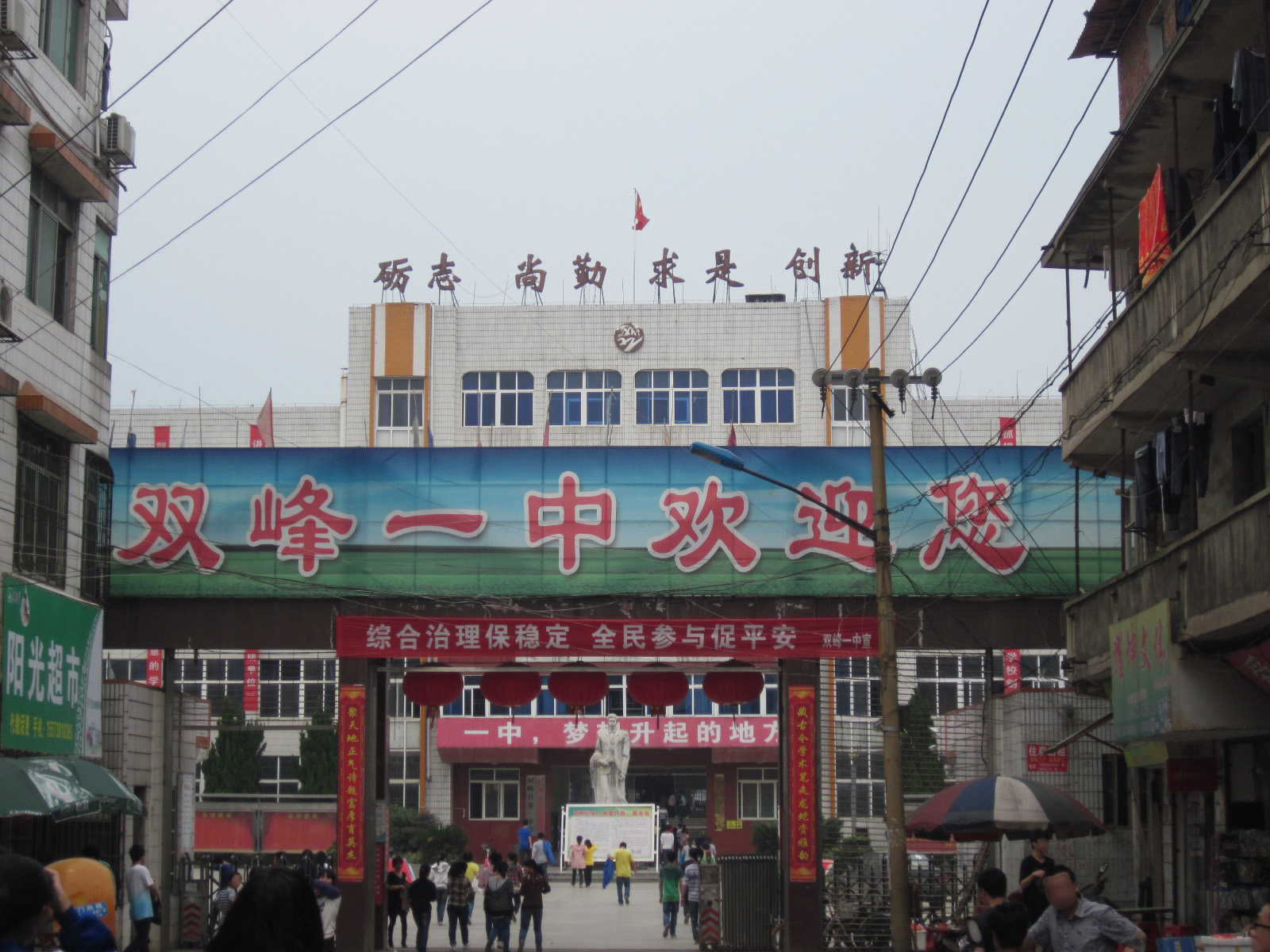
- Entrance of Shuangfeng County No. 1 High School.

Location
- Shuangfeng County, Hunan, China; 410635
- Coordinates: 27°28′03″N 112°10′21″E

Information
- Type: Comprehensive Public High School
- Motto: 励志、尚勤、求是、创新 (Motivational, Diligent, Seeking, Innovation)
- Established: 1760
- Principal: Mao Guoming (毛果明)
- Faculty: 236
- Grades: 10 to 12
- Gender: Coed
- Enrollment: 4000
- Campus size: 97,963 square metres (1,054,460 sq ft)
- Campus type: Suburban
- Song: (《双峰一中校歌》)
- Affiliation: Loudi Municipal Bureau of Education

Shuangfeng County No. 1 High School (simplified Chinese: 双峰县第一中学; traditional Chinese: 雙峰縣第一中學; pinyin: Shuāngfēng Yīzhōng), commonly abbreviated as (Shuangfeng) Yizhong (simplified Chinese: 双峰一中; traditional Chinese: 雙峰一中), is a public coeducational high school in Shuangfeng County, Hunan, China.

== History ==
The school traces its origins to the former Shuangfeng Academy (双峰书院), founded by the local government in 1760 and would later become the Shuangfeng School in 1905.

In 1905, under the order of Qing dynasty (1644–1911) Emperor Guangxu (1871–1908), the old academy was renamed Shuangfeng Higher School (双峰高等小学堂). Peng Shiyi (彭时绎) was the first supervisor.

In 1941, the school became a middle school.

In March 1950, the school merged with Xiangxiang Second Girls' Vocational School (湘乡第二女子职业学校) to form the Xiangxiang County Second Meddle School (湘乡县立第二初级中学). Peng Xixian (彭希贤) served as its president.

In November 1953, the school was renamed Xiangxiang County First Meddle School (湘乡县立第一初级中学).

In 1956, the school became a high school.

In 2017, Shuangfeng County No. 1 High School ranked at number 389 on the National Top 500 High Schools. In January, the new campus has been basically completed and fully operational.

== Athletics ==
- Volleyball
- Basketball
- Football
- Table tennis
- Badminton
- Running

== Notable alumni ==
- Cai Hesen, revolutionist.
- Cai Chang, politician.
- Huang Gonglüe, general.
- Song Xilian, politician.

== Gallery ==
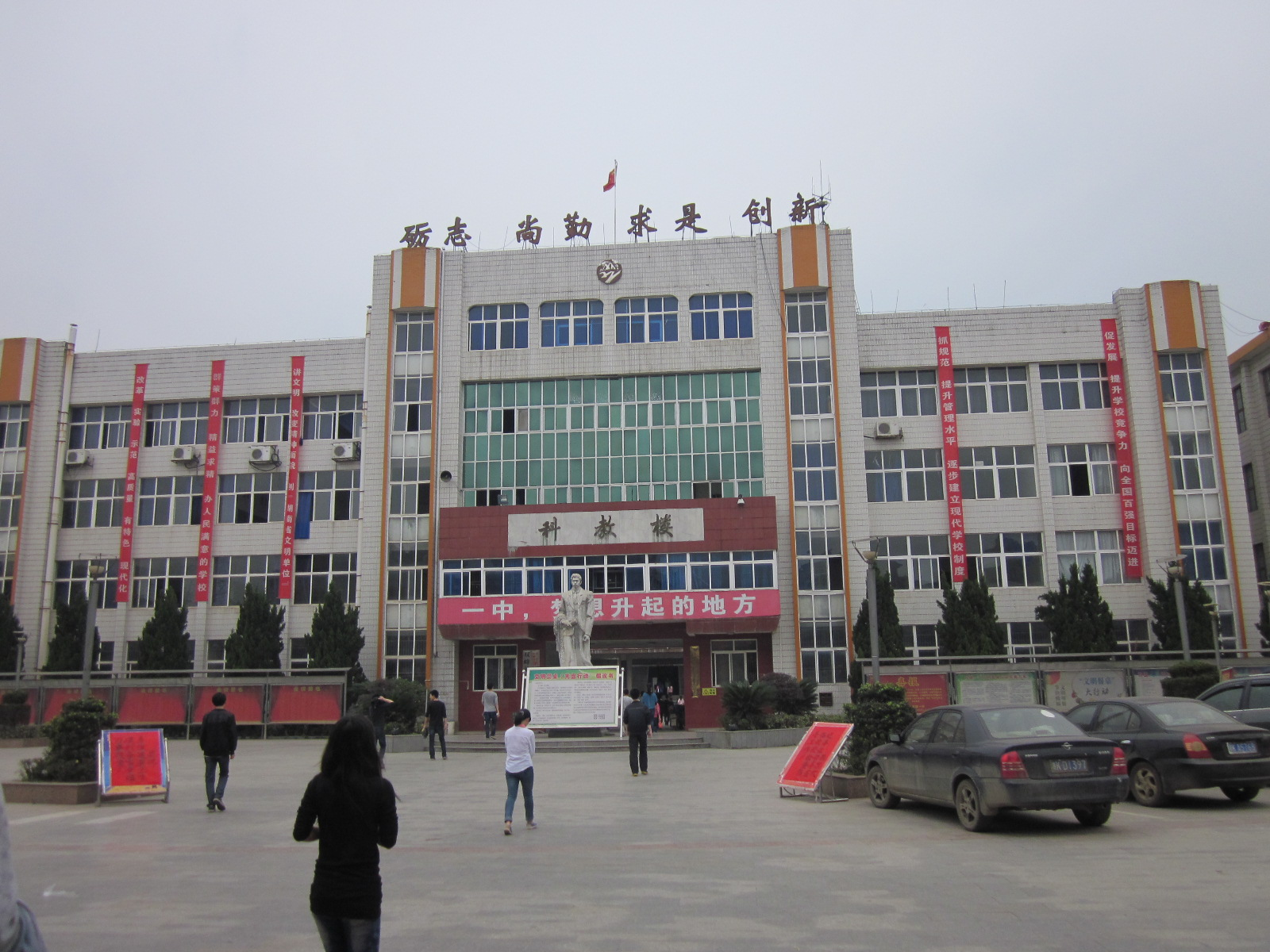
The Science and Education Building.

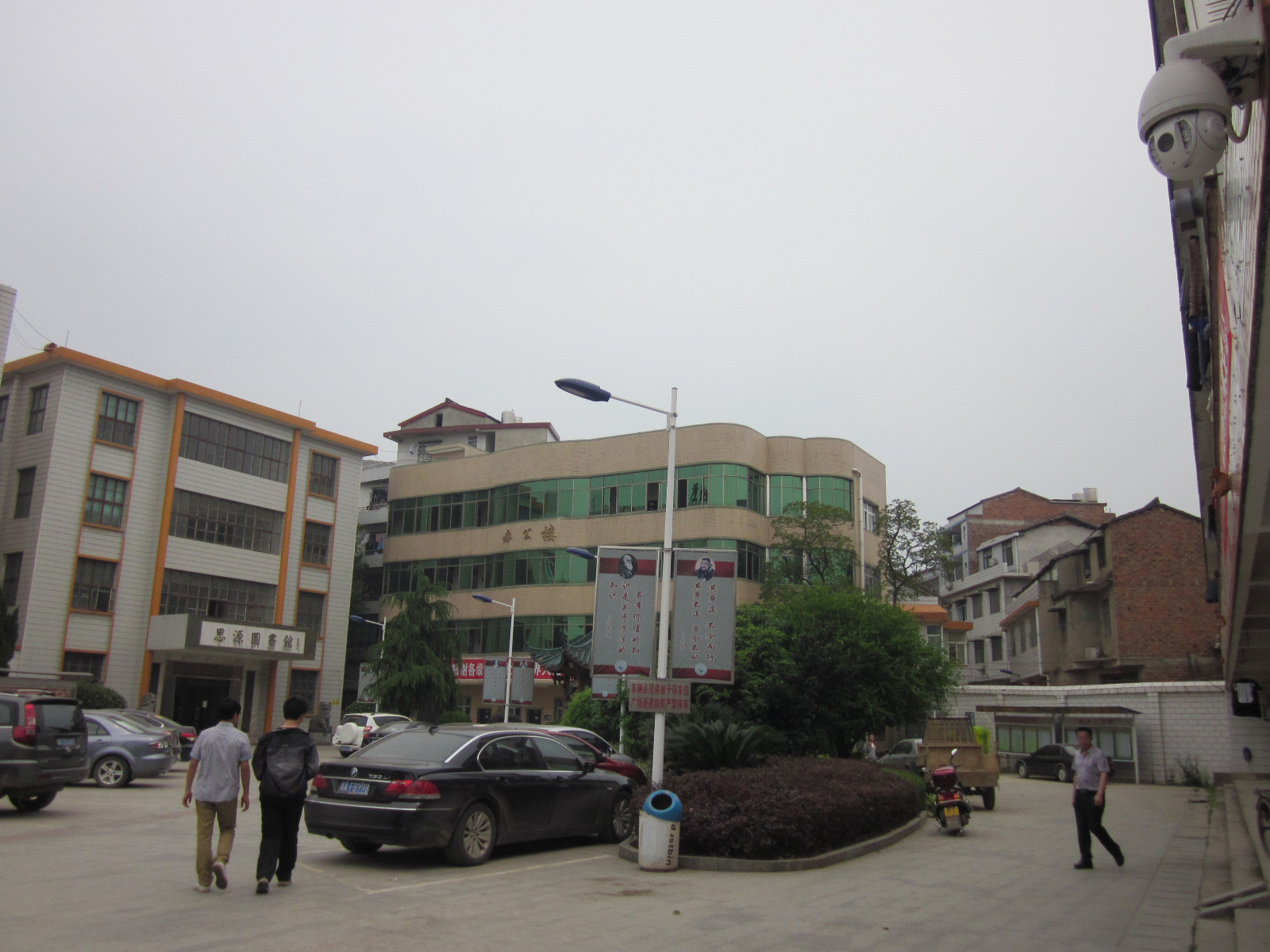
The Siyuan Library (思源图书馆).
