= Zoumajie =

Zoumajie Town 走马街镇
- Town
- Location in Hunan
- Coordinates: 27°30′41″N 112°06′13″E
- Country: People's Republic of China
- Province: Hunan
- Prefecture-level city: Loudi
- County: Shuangfeng

Area
  - Total: 107.8 km^{2} (41.6 sq mi)

Population
  - Total: 68,000
  - Density: 630/km^{2} (1,600/sq mi)
- Time zone: UTC+8 (China Standard)
- Postal code: 417725
- Area code: 0738

Zoumajie Town (simplified Chinese: 走马街镇; traditional Chinese: 走馬街鎮; pinyin: Zǒumǎjiē Zhèn) is an urban town in Shuangfeng County, Hunan Province, People's Republic of China.

== Administrative divisions ==
The town is divided into 70 villages and 1 community, which include the following areas:

- Tangtuo Community
- Xiangquan Village
- Xianghua Village
- Jinbeng Village
- Jinping Village
- Yanyan Village
- Jinlong Village
- Shijian Village
- Longkou Village
- Maxian Village
- Quanshui Village
- Mishui Village
- Shuangwan Village
- Yintai Village
- Shichong Village
- Shitan Village
- Yangtan Village
- Gaochong Village
- Dayuan Village
- Shanshu Village
- Wanjia Village
- Wuyi Village
- Julun Village
- Quwan Village
- Fengshu Village
- Guantuo Village
- Baofeng Village
- Datang Village
- Daxing Village
- Tongyu Village
- Tongyi Village
- Shuikou Village
- Jianlou Village
- Tongfu Village
- Ya'an Village
- Xinpu Village
- Quanjing Village
- Qiutang Village
- Dama Village
- Zouma Village
- Tuotang Village
- Wanfu Village
- Hemin Village
- Songjia Village
- Jiangjun Village
- Jinlin Village
- Shixi Village
- Jiuxi Village
- Yangchong Village
- Dingxing Village
- Zengxin Village
- Tangxing Village
- Zhoujia Village
- Caishi Village
- Lixin Village
- Gutian Village
- Shimen Village
- Yifeng Village
- Fengxing Village
- Shantang Village
- Fanrong Village
- Xiabaiyang Village
- Xiashantang Village
- Baishu Village
- Shenshan Village
- Gaolou Village
- Jieping Village
- Jiaoqiao Village
- Jiaoxi Village
- Meishanping Village
- Meifeng Village
