= Xingzipu =

Xingzipu Town 杏子铺镇
- Town
- Location in Hunan
- Coordinates: 27°37′12″N 112°14′03″E
- Country: People's Republic of China
- Province: Hunan
- Prefecture-level city: Loudi
- County: Shuangfeng

Area
  - Total: 176 km^{2} (68 sq mi)

Population
  - Total: 73,000
  - Density: 410/km^{2} (1,100/sq mi)
- Time zone: UTC+8 (China Standard)
- Area code: 0738

Xingzipu Town (simplified Chinese: 杏子铺镇; traditional Chinese: 杏子鋪鎮; pinyin: Xìngzipū Zhèn) is an urban town in Shuangfeng County, Hunan Province, People's Republic of China.

== Administrative division ==
The town is divided into 42 villages and 1 community, with 74 villagers' committees:

- Mujiatang Community
- Gaojia Village
- Qingle Village
- Shihu Village
- Wangmao Village
- Xiheng Village
- Huashu Village
- Songgui Village
- Heyi Village
- Douyan Village
- Yanhe Village
- Meizi Village
- Nixi Village
- Shuangchong Village
- Wuhe Village
- Xitang Village
- Ziyuan Village
- Xikou Village
- Shuangyuan Village
- Guangjing Village
- Chuangshi Village
- Hexin Village
- Xingzi Village
- Tingzi Village
- Mujia Village
- Pinduan Village
- Huajia Village
- Dashu Village
- Jiangkou Village
- Guihua Village
- Tongxin Village
- Ouyuan Village
- Qingyuan Village
- Shibi Village
- Xin'an Village
- Hetang Village
- Shiba Village
- Yunting Village
- Daping Village
- Quanba Village
- Xinhui Village
- Leye Village
- Changhe Village
- Longfan Village
- Gaoni Village
- Juzhen Village
- Tongsheng Village
- Hutang Village
- Shuangshi Village
- Shuini Village
- Ceshui Village
- Longtang Village
- Dakang Village
- Baisha Village
- Xiaoyao Village
- Hupo Village
- Wannian Village
- Bijia Village
- Hemu Village
- Hefeng Village
- Xianfeng Village
- Hongyang Village
- Hejia Village
- Xuetang Village
- Dafeng Village
- Pingshang Village
- Xuanfeng Village
- Gaoguang Village
- Mayi Village
- Zhangmu Village
- Aotou Village
- Hongsheng Village
- Yanqiao Village
- Minzhu Village
- Li'ai Village
