= Deng Qidong =

Chinese geologist

- 邓起东
- Born: January 1938; Shuangfeng County, Hunan, China
- Died: 6 November 2018 (aged 80); 301 Hospital, Beijing, China
- Education: Central South University
- Children: 1
- Scientific career
- Fields: Earthquake
- Workplaces: Chinese Academy of Sciences

Chinese name
- Traditional Chinese: 鄧起東
- Simplified Chinese: 邓起东
Transcriptions
Standard Mandarin
- Hanyu Pinyin: Dèng Qǐdōng
- Wade–Giles: Teng Ch'i-tung

Deng Qidong (Chinese: 邓起东; Wade–Giles: Teng Ch'i-tung; January 1938 – 6 November 2018) was a Chinese geologist.

== Biography ==
Deng was born in Shuangfeng County, Hunan in 1938. After graduating from the Central South University in 1961, he was assigned to the Institute of Geology, Chinese Academy of Sciences. He joined the Chinese Communist Party on 25 May 1961. From February 1978 to March 1998 he worked in the China Earthquake Administration, where he was appointed director of Graduate Degree Committee of Geological Research Institute. In 2003 he was elected a fellow of the Chinese Academy of Sciences. He died of illness at Beijing 301 Hospital, in Beijing, on 6 November 2018.

== Papers ==
- Teng Chitung; Chang Yuming; Hsu Kweilin; Fan Futian (1979). "Tectonic Stress Field in China and its Relation to Plate Movement". Physics of the Earth and Planetary Interiors. 18: 257–273. doi:10.1016/0031-9201(79)90063-3.
- Ma Xingyuan; Deng Qidong (1980). "The Characteristics of Seismisity and Seismotectonics in China". Revista Geofísica. 13: 61–82.
- Deng Qidong; Jiang Pu; Lucile M. Jones; Peter Molnar (1981). "A Preliminary analysis of Reported The Seismotectonical changes in Ground Water and Anomalous Animal Behavior before the 4 February 1975 Haicheng Earthquake, Earthquake Prediction-An International Review". Maurice Ewing Series. 4: 543–565.
- Ma Xingyuan; Deng Qidong; Wang Yipeng; Liu Hefu (1982). "Cenozoic Graben Systems in North China". Zeitschrift für Geomorphologie Supplementbände. 42: 99–116.
- Zhang Weiqi; Deng Qidong; B. C. Burchfiel; Zhang Peizhen (1983). "Active Faulting and the formation of a Pullapart Basin along the Western Part of the Haiyuan fault, China, EOS, Trans". Am. Geophys. Union. 64: 861.
- Deng Qidong (1984). "Kinematic Features and Slip Rates of Late Quaternary Active Faultings of Qinghai Xizang (Tibet) Plateau and Kinematic Characteristics of the Plateau and Secondary Blocks within it, Himalayan Geology International".

== Awards ==
- 1978 Second Prize of the State Scientific and Technological Progress Award
