= Zeng Yong =

Chinese academic

- 曾勇

President of University of Electronic Science and Technology of China
- Incumbent
- Assumed office September 2018
- Preceded by: Li Yanrong

Personal details
- Born: October 1963 (age 62–63)
- Party: China Zhi Gong Party
- Education: Tsinghua University (BE, MEng, DMgt)

Zeng Yong (Chinese: 曾勇; pinyin: Zēng Yǒng; born October 1963) is a Chinese professor of management and academic administrator, currently serving as president of the University of Electronic Science and Technology of China since September 2018.

== Education ==
Zeng received a Bachelor of Engineering with a major in industrial automation in 1985, a Master of Engineering in system engineering in 1988, and a Doctor of Management in management science and engineering in 2000, all from Tsinghua University.

Zeng was a postdoctoral fellow at the Chinese University of Hong Kong from 2000 to 2001, an English training student at Sichuan University in 2007, and a visiting scholar at the Georgia Institute of Technology from 2010 to 2011.

== Career ==
Zeng joined the University of Electronic Science and Technology of China as a teaching assistant in 1988. He was appointed as a professor at the School of Management and Economics in 1998 and served as dean of the School from 2001 to 2015. He served as vice president of UESTC from 2015 to 2018 and university president since 2018.

Zeng was a member of the thirteenth Chinese People's Political Consultative Conference National Committee.
