= Former Residence of Zeng Guofan =

- 曾国藩故居
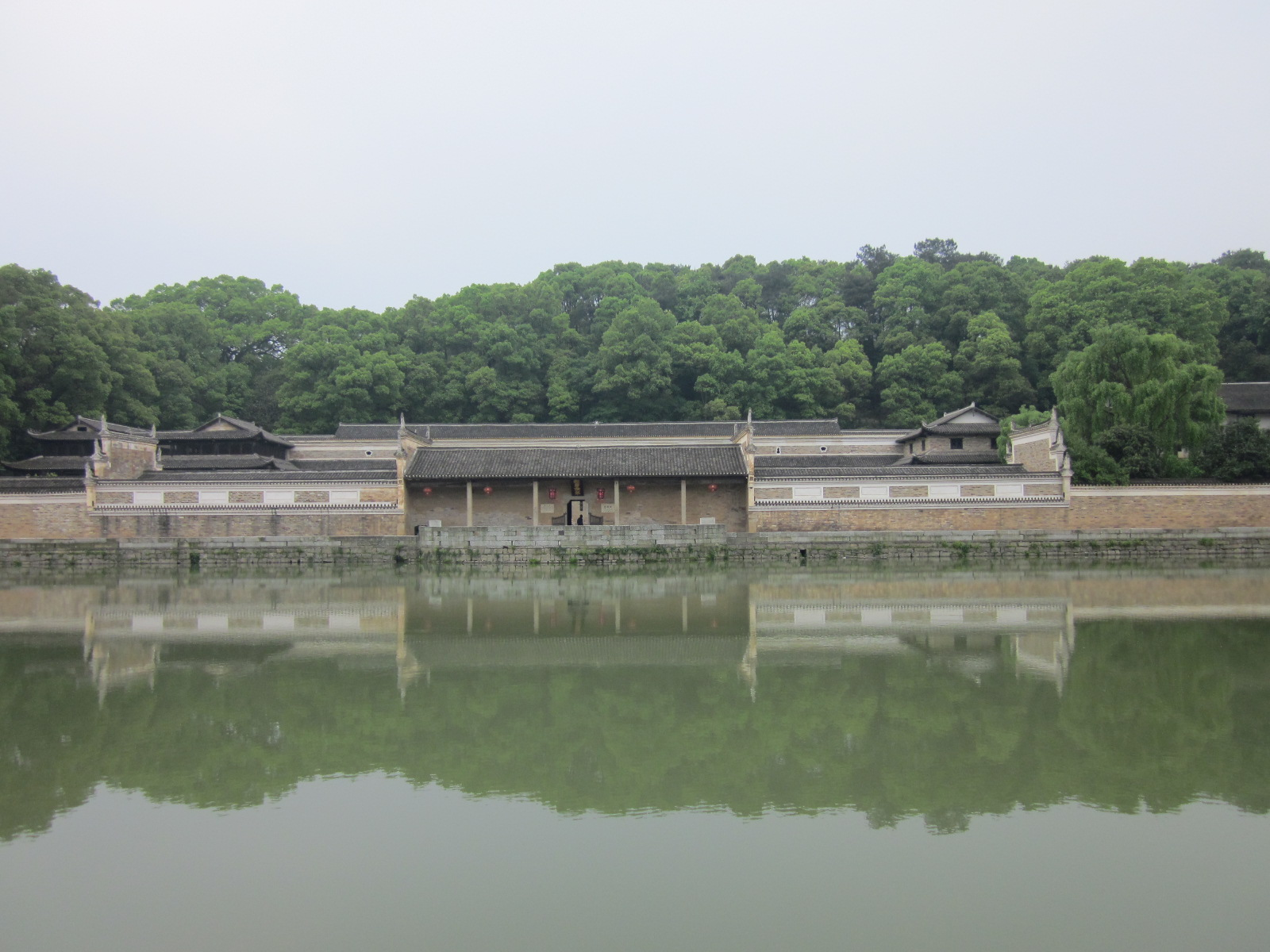
- Frontal view of the Former Residence of Zeng Guofan.

- Location within Hunan Former Residence of Zeng Guofan (China)

General information
- Type: Traditional folk houses
- Location: Heye Town, Hunan, China
- Coordinates: 27°40′N 111°59′E
- Completed: 1865
- Owner: Government of Shuangfeng County

Technical details
- Material: Brick and wood
- Floor area: 10,000 m^{2} (110,000 sq ft)
- Grounds: 40,000 m^{2} (430,000 sq ft)

The Former Residence of Zeng Guofan or Zeng Guofan's Former Residence (simplified Chinese: 曾国藩故居; traditional Chinese: 曾國藩故居; pinyin: Zēng Guófān Gùjū) was built in 1865. It is located in Heye Town, Shuangfeng County, Hunan, China. It includes the Banyue Pool (半月塘; 'half-moon pool'), gatehouse, main buildings, Qiuque Pavilion (求缺斋), Guipu Pavilion (归璞斋), Yifang Hall (艺芳馆), and Siyun Hall (思云馆), of which Siyun Hall was built by Zeng Guofan himself in 1857. Covering an area of more than 40,000 square metres (430,000 sq ft) with construction area of 10,000 square metres (110,000 sq ft), Fuhou Mansion, the most completely preserved rural marquis mansion in China, symmetrically distributes the buildings along a central axis with a scattered layout and open view that is large in scale and solemn in appearance.

== History ==
The house was built in 1865, in the 4th year of Tongzhi period (1862–1875) in the Qing dynasty (1644–1911).

In 1996, it has been designated as a provincial key cultural unit.

In 2006, it is listed among the six batch of "Major National Historical and Cultural Sites" by the State Council of China.

== Gallery ==
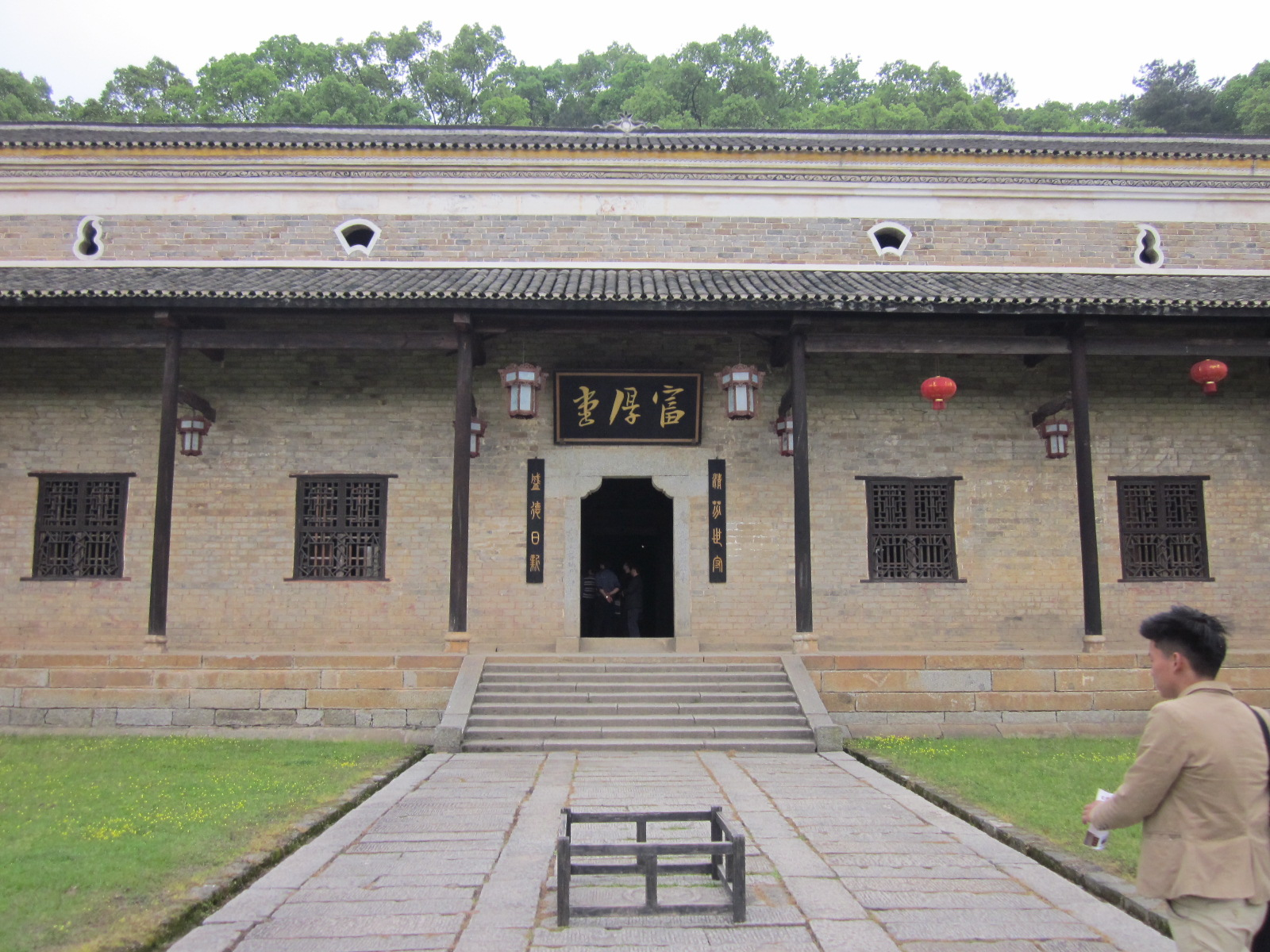
Fuhou Mansion.

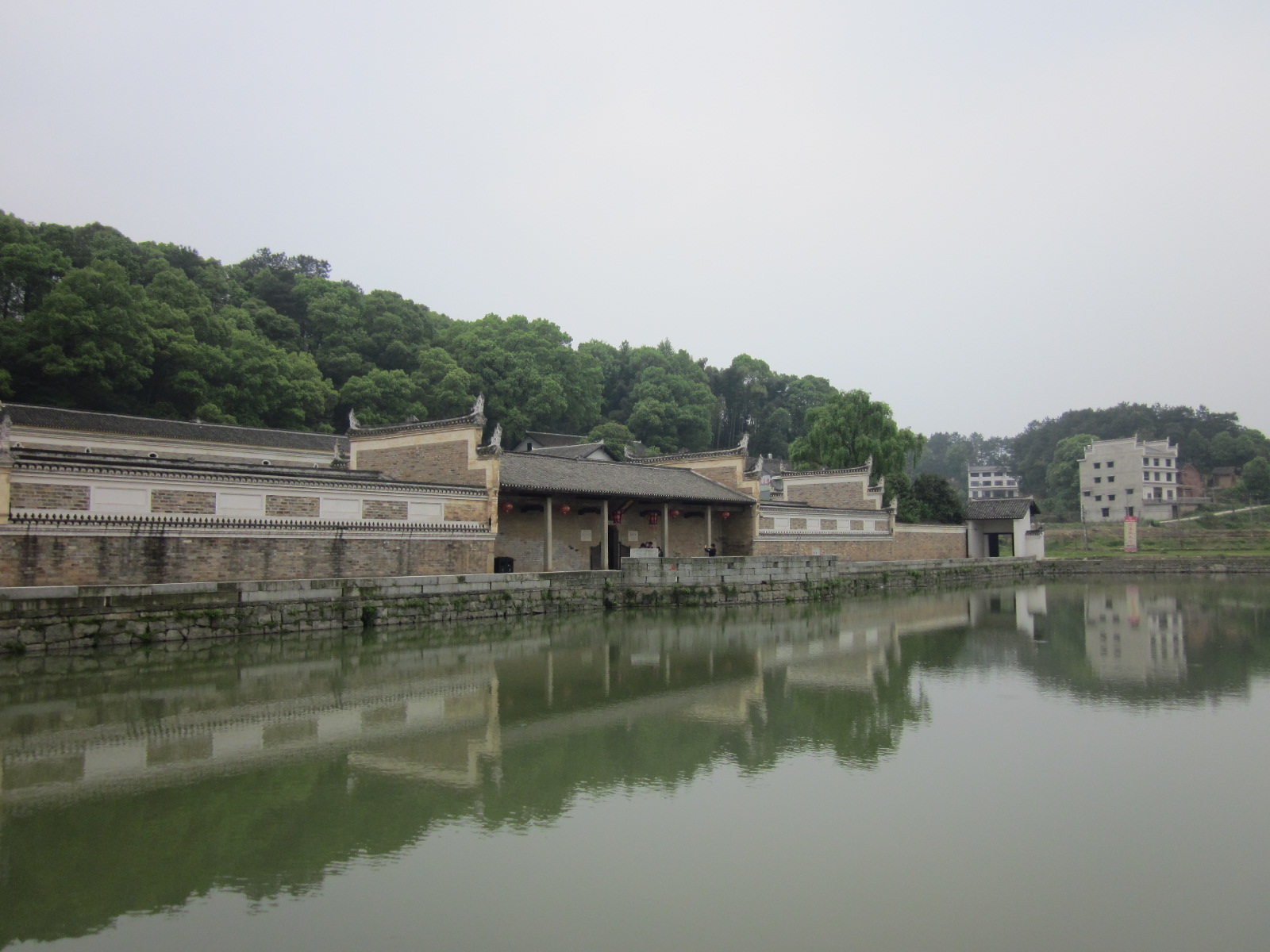

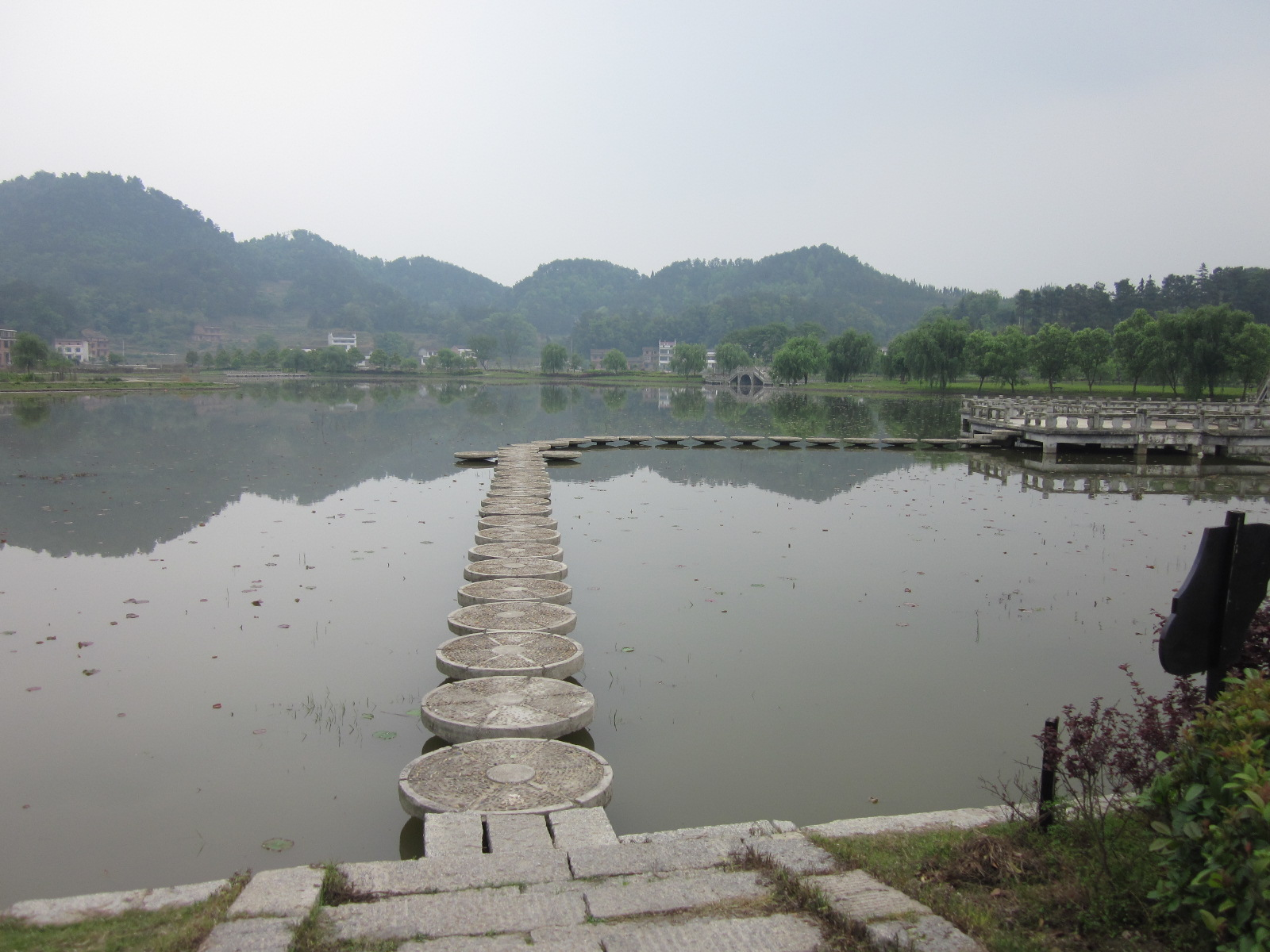
Banyue Pool.

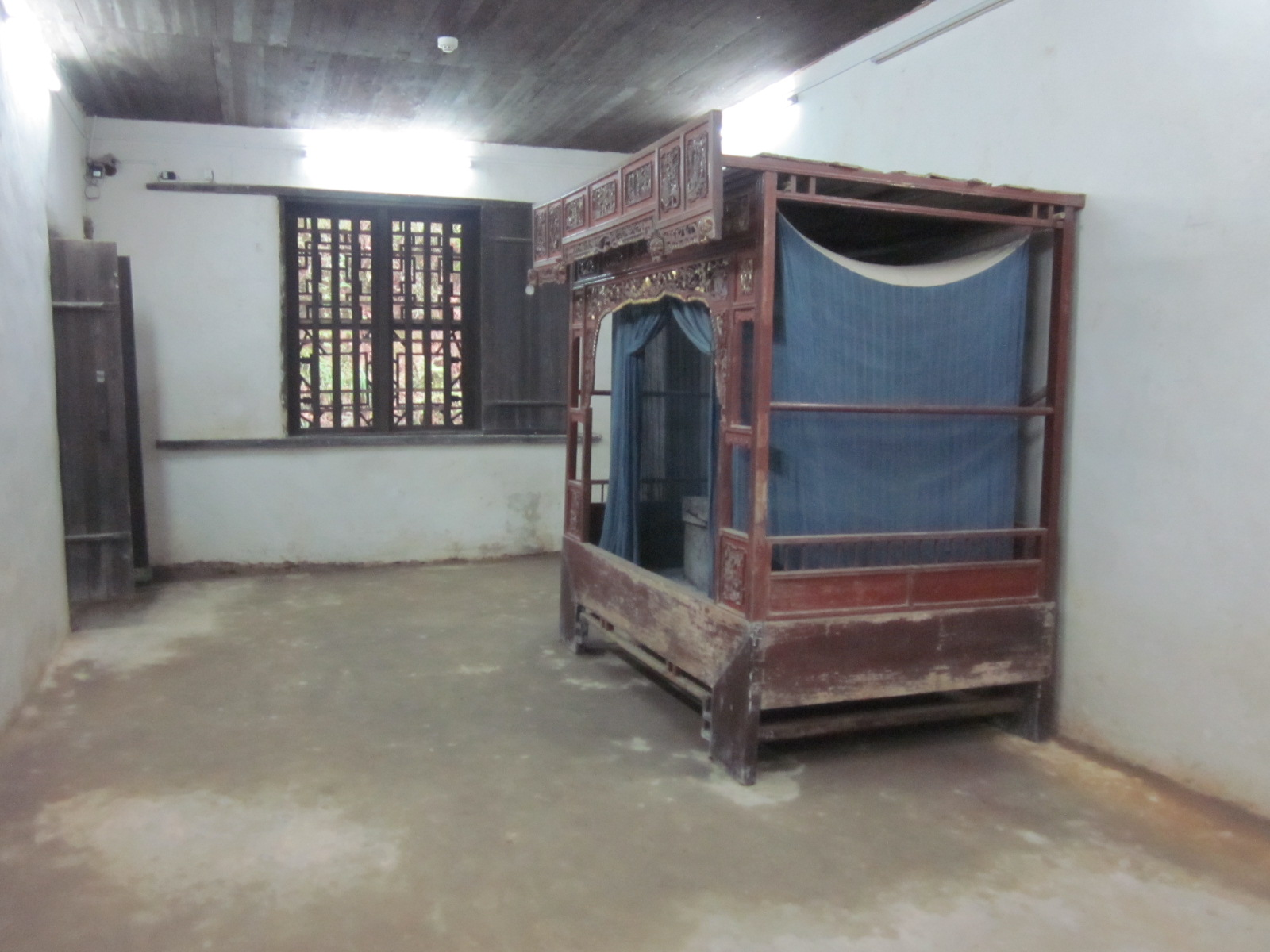
Bedroom.

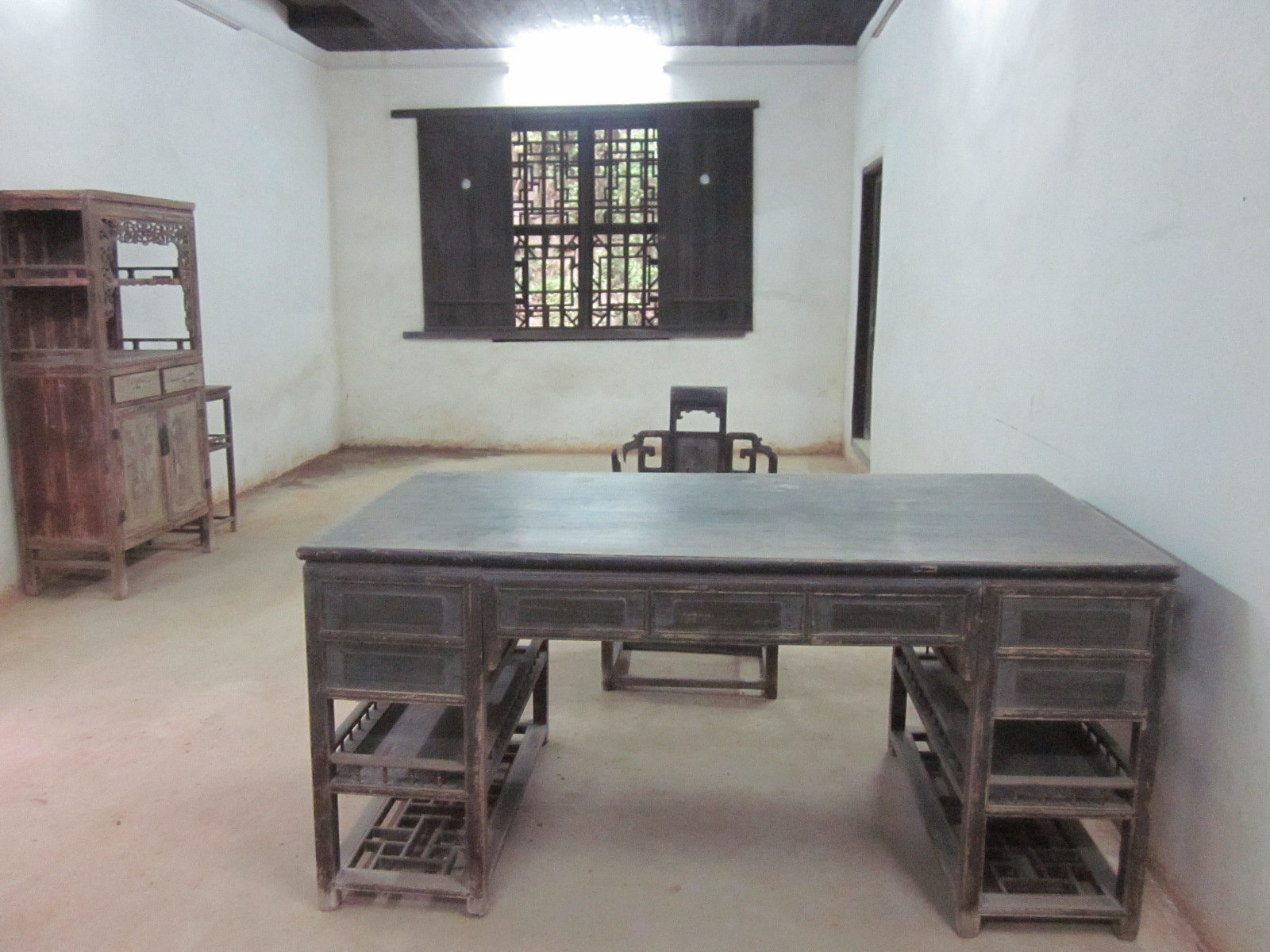
Study room.

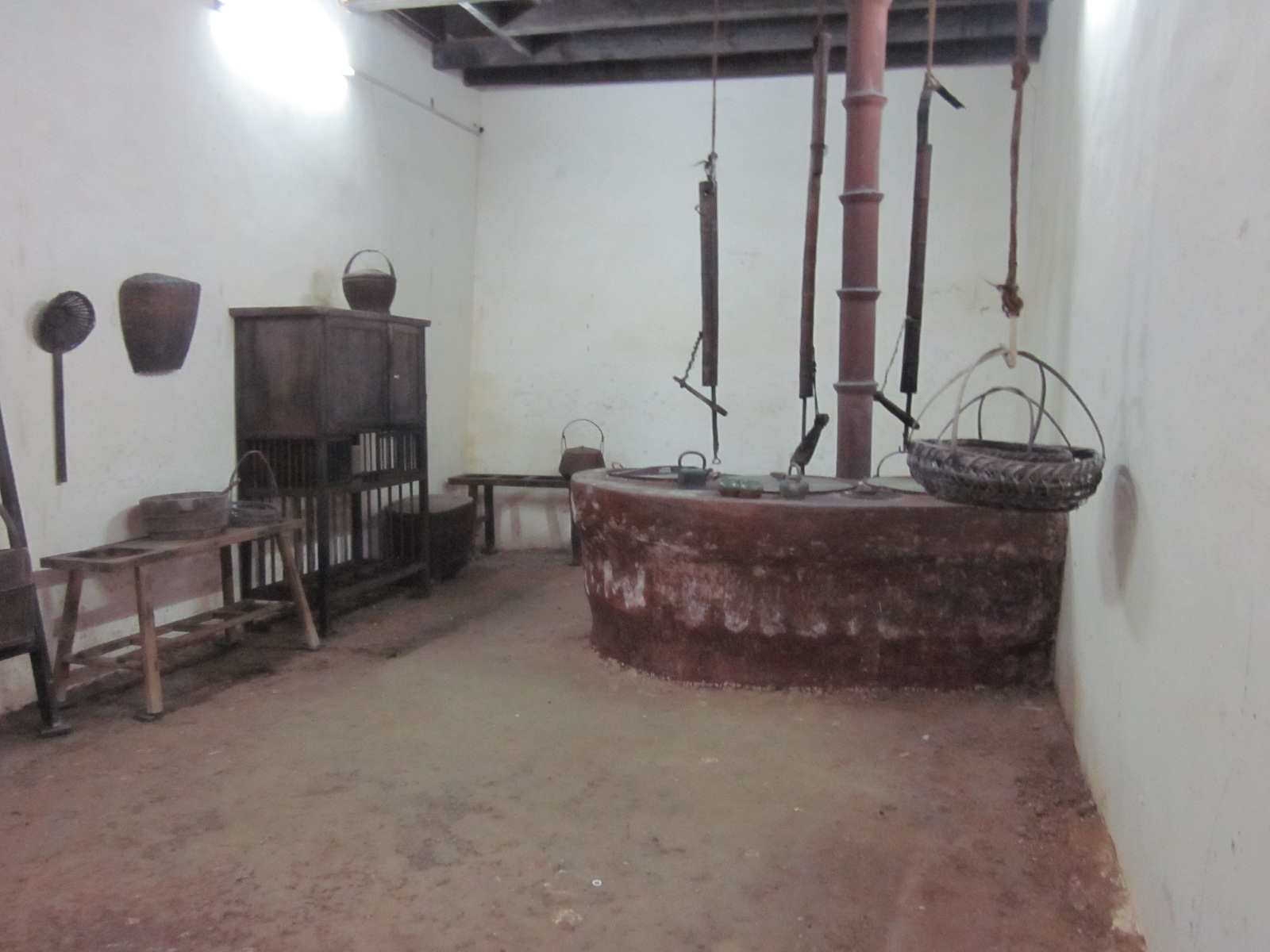
Kitchen.

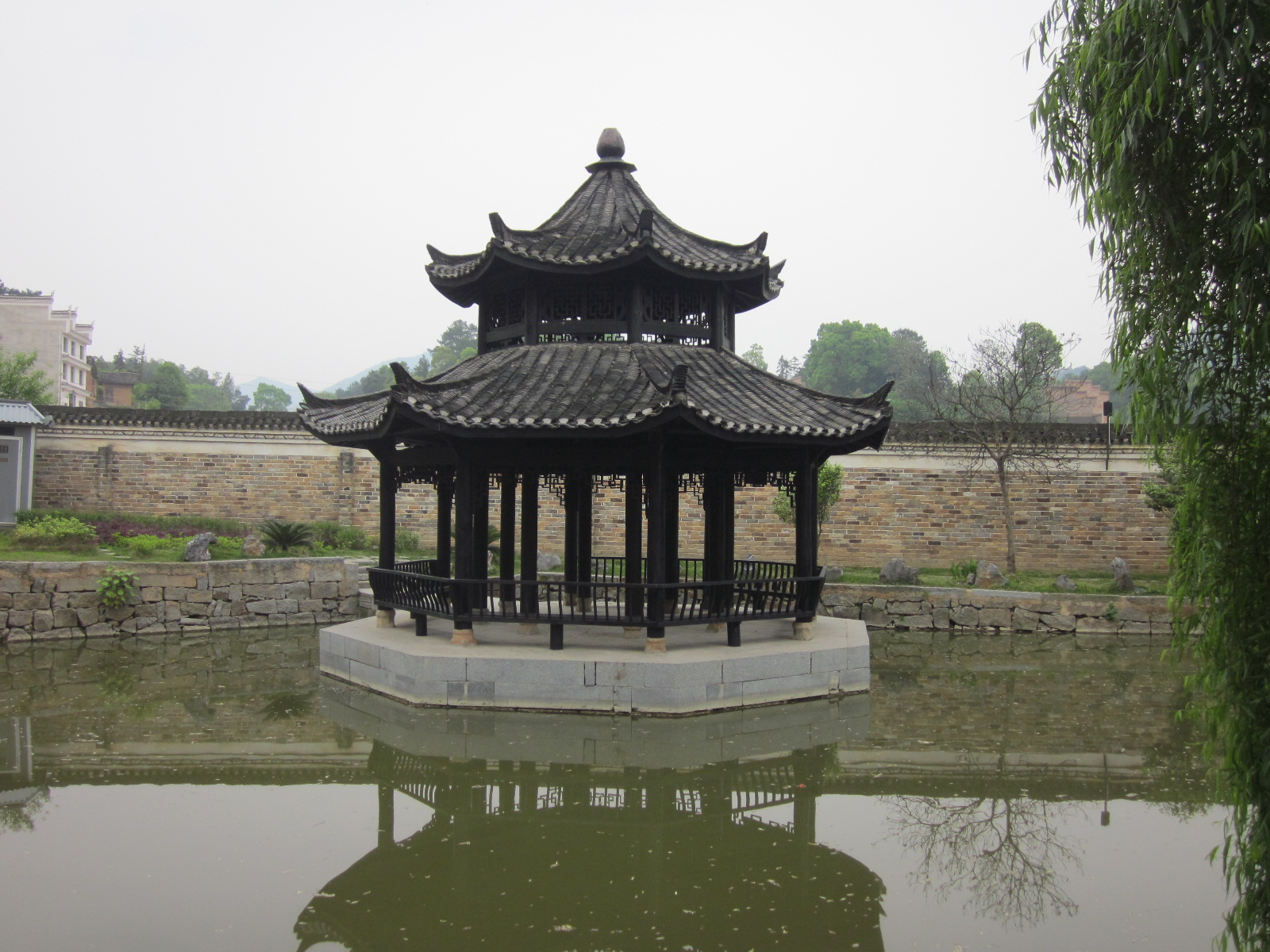
A Chinese pavilion.

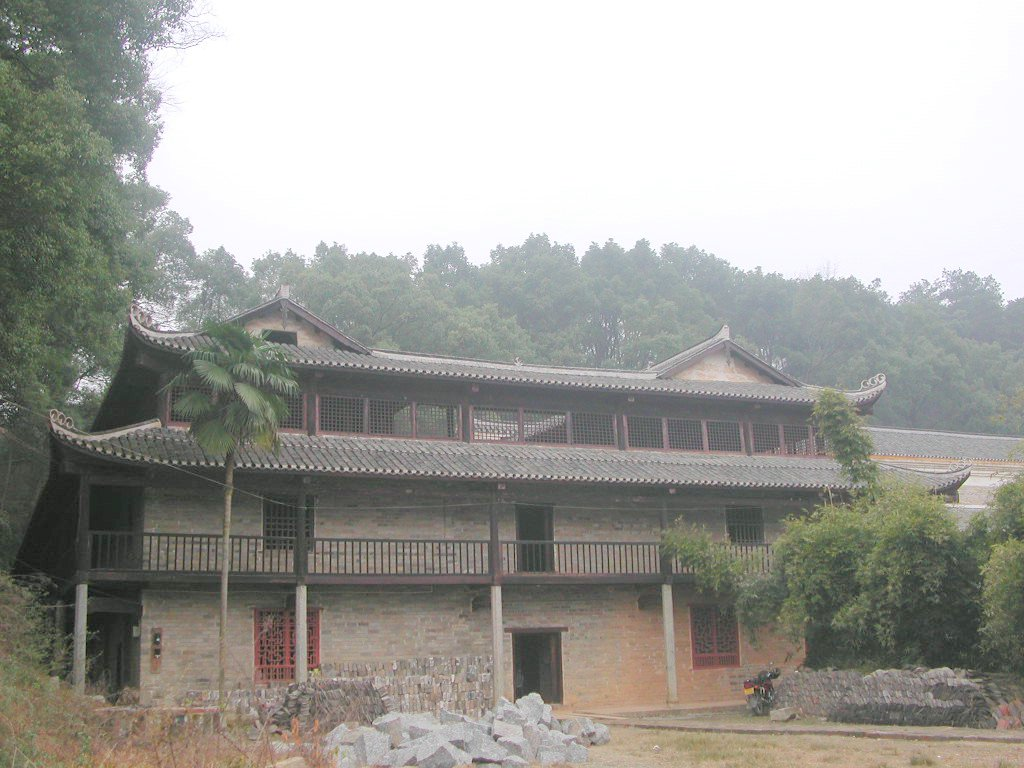
The library.
