= Shatang, Shuangfeng =

Shatang Township 沙塘镇
- Township
- Location in Hunan
- Coordinates: 27°28′41″N 112°19′15″E
- Country: People's Republic of China
- Province: Hunan
- Prefecture-level city: Loudi
- district: Shuangfeng

Area
  - Total: 69 km^{2} (27 sq mi)

Population
  - Total: 31,000
  - Density: 450/km^{2} (1,200/sq mi)
- Time zone: UTC+8 (China Standard)
- Area code: 0738

Shatang Town (simplified Chinese: 沙塘镇; traditional Chinese: 沙塘鎮; pinyin: Shātáng Zhèn) is an urban township in Shuangfeng County, Hunan Province, China.

== Administrative division ==
The township is divided into 31 villages, which include the following areas: Daxi Village, Jingyang Village, Huangtuba Village, Hengtian Village, Jinglin Village, Shuangyong Village, Lashu Village, Jingmin Village, Shatian Village, Shuiyuan Village, Shiqiao Village, Yanxiao Village, shishui Village, Hongyun Village, Dashi Village, Hongtian Village, Shaping Village, Shatang Village, Shantang Village, Shantang Village, Xiangshui Village, Bandong Village, Huitian Village, Shixing Village, Baishi Village, Shifeng Village, Zifeng Village, Mitang Village, Shangyan Village, Zitian Village, Zixing Village, and Zhongshi Village.
