= Suoshi, Shuangfeng =

Suoshi Town 锁石镇
- Town
- Location in Hunan
- Coordinates: 27°19′16″N 112°06′36″E
- Country: People's Republic of China
- Province: Hunan
- Prefecture-level city: Loudi
- County: Shuangfeng

Area
  - Total: 65.4 km^{2} (25.3 sq mi)

Population
  - Total: 34,000
  - Density: 520/km^{2} (1,300/sq mi)
- Time zone: UTC+8 (China Standard)
- Area code: 0738

Suoshi Town (simplified Chinese: 锁石镇; traditional Chinese: 鎖石鎮; pinyin: Suǒshí Zhèn) is an urban town in Shuangfeng County, Hunan Province, People's Republic of China.

== Administrative divisions ==
The town is divided into 38 villages and 1 community, which include the following areas: Xinxing Community, Nanyang Village, Jingxing Village, Xitian Village, Zhujia Village, Longxu Village, Suoshi Village, Jitong Village, Dajie Village, Shuangxi Village, Hehe Village, Chetian Village, Zhimu Village, Tuanjie Village, Lianhe Village, Tanjia Village, Shijiang Village, Jinzifeng Village, Pingshang Village, Lengshan Village, Shandi Village, Haokou Village, Tiji Village, Jinxing Village, Baiyuan Village, Hengshi Village, Paitang Village, Shuang'an Village, Yutian Village, Qunli Village, Fengjia Village, Yachong Village, Shuanglian Village, Xinqiao Village, Shizhu Village, Xinxi Village, Limin Village, Qixin Village, and Jianshuang Village (新兴社区、南阳村、景星村、西田村、祝甲村、龙须村、锁石村、集同村、大街村、双溪村、和合村、车田村、梽木村、团结村、联合村、谭家村、石江村、金子峰村、坪上村、冷山村、山底村、壕口村、堤吉村、金星村、白元村、横石村、牌塘村、双安村、雨田村、群力村、丰家村、湴冲村、双联村、新桥村、十竹村、新溪村、利民村、齐心村、建双村).
