= Zimenqiao =

Zimenqiao Town 梓门桥镇
- Town
- Location in Hunan
- Coordinates: 27°30′55″N 112°14′01″E
- Country: People's Republic of China
- Province: Hunan
- Prefecture-level city: Loudi
- County: Shuangfeng

Area
  - Total: 132.6 km^{2} (51.2 sq mi)

Population
  - Total: 61,872
  - Density: 466.6/km^{2} (1,209/sq mi)
- Time zone: UTC+8 (China Standard)
- Area code: 0738

Zimenqiao Town (simplified Chinese: 梓门桥镇; traditional Chinese: 梓門橋鎮; pinyin: Zǐménqiáo Zhèn) is an urban town in Shuangfeng County, Hunan Province, People's Republic of China.

== Administrative divisions ==
The town is divided into 65 villages and 1 community, which include the following areas:

- Zimuqiao Community
- Diping Village
- Tongling Village
- Suwan Village
- Zhongjiang Village
- Baxian Village
- Chating Village
- Yinshan Village
- Jiebu Village
- Xindi Village
- Shizui Village
- Guangming Village
- Yonghe Village
- Jianshan Village
- Dongshan Village
- Shantian Village
- Kuangsha Village
- Paitou Village
- Jinkeng Village
- Longwangdian Village
- Fuling Village
- Baishan Village
- Village
- Renli Village
- Changsheng Village
- Yongsheng Village
- Fuxing Village
- Shuanglin Village
- Pingwan Village
- Yuanquan Village
- Dongwan Village
- Xinzhuang Village
- Huangshi Village
- Tuqiao Village
- Shuizhou Village
- Tonghua Village
- Zhoujing Village
- Da Village
- Xingxing Village
- Shilai Village
- Tiaoshi Village
- Huangma Village
- Xinhua Village
- Xiniu Village
- Houtian Village
- Qingshi Village
- Zhumutan Village
- Dachong Village
- Longjia Village
- Wanxi Village
- Qingfeng Village
- Wantou Village
- Tanshanba Village
- Dongwanli Village
- Ziqiao Village
- Xinghuo Village
- Qinglan Village
- Meilong Village
- Liangtian Village
- Yingxiong Village
- Shimen Village
- Zimu Village
- Shengtang Village
- Xinghui Village
- Sujia'ao Village
- Jinyuan Village
- Qianjin Village
