= Shiniu, Shuangfeng =

Shiniu Township 石牛乡
- Township
- Location in Hunan
- Coordinates: 27°22′57″N 112°14′03″E
- Country: People's Republic of China
- Province: Hunan
- Prefecture-level city: Loudi
- County: Shuangfeng

Area
  - Total: 176.7 km^{2} (68.2 sq mi)

Population
  - Total: 43,000
  - Density: 240/km^{2} (630/sq mi)
- Time zone: UTC+8 (China Standard)
- Area code: 0738

Shiniu Township (simplified Chinese: 石牛乡; traditional Chinese: 石牛鄉; pinyin: Shíniú Xiāng) is a rural township in Shuangfeng County, Hunan Province, People's Republic of China.

== Administrative division ==
The township is divided into 60 villages, including the following areas:

- Xinsheng Village
- Yanshi Village
- Xinli Village
- Shizi Village
- Yongjia Village
- Xiannvdian Village
- Jinfeng Village
- Hongwei Village
- Paixingshan Village
- Qiaoting Village
- Xinnong Village
- Baizhu Village
- Shigu Village
- Shanshan Village
- Tianshiling Village
- Xiaodong Village
- Longshang Village
- Baishu Village
- Wanzhou Village
- Shushan Village
- Shuxin Village
- Shuanghe Village
- Huangni Village
- Youyuan Village
- Mushan Village
- Xinfeng Village
- Jifu Village
- Xiaoshui Village
- Taolin Village
- Yuxing Village
- Changfeng Village
- Shiniu Village
- Lianglong Village
- Caisang Village
- Hengcheng Village
- Hongjia Village
- Daojia Village
- Shankou Village
- Qizhang Village
- Bajiao Village
- Ma'an Village
- Shuangxin Village
- Tianming Village
- Changhan Village
- Wuyi Village
- Shangduan Village
- Xiaoyuan Village
- Yatian Village
- Shuangjiang Village
- Dishui Village
- Chayuan Village
- Gaoxian Village
- Tianjin Village
- Guyun Village
- Chengchong Village
- Nanchong Village
- Jiufeng Village
- Shuikou Village
- Shilong Village
- Liangsi Village
