= Yintang, Shuangfeng =

Yintang Township 印塘乡
- Township
- Location in Hunan
- Coordinates: 27°26′07″N 112°08′08″E
- Country: People's Republic of China
- Province: Hunan
- Prefecture-level city: Loudi
- County: Shuangfeng

Area
  - Total: 97 km^{2} (37 sq mi)

Population
  - Total: 47,800
  - Density: 490/km^{2} (1,300/sq mi)
- Time zone: UTC+8 (China Standard)
- Area code: 0738

Yintang Township (simplified Chinese: 印塘乡; traditional Chinese: 印塘鄉; pinyin: Yìntáng Xiāng) is a rural township in Shuangfeng County, Hunan Province, People's Republic of China.

== Administrative divisions ==
The township is divided into 47 villages, which include the following areas: Dongfeng Village, Tiemashan Village, Meishui Village, Shihuitang Village, Guanling Village, Duanjiawan Village, Meizi'ao Village, Baima Village, Hetian Village, Yanjingwan Village, Pengshawan Village, Xianshenzhai Village, Sulong Village, Maolun Village, Daqiao Village, Yuejia Village, Jianqiang Village, Siwan Village, Yangliujing Village, Wuwan Village, Guanghua Village, Longhua Village, Dafeng Village, Jintang Village, Sicheng Village, Dajing Village, Yintang Village, Songjiang Village, Shiwanli Village, Daijiawan Village, Shixia Village, Duanjia Village, Maiyuan Village, Xinyuan Village, Yangmei Village, Zeshi Village, Huajie Village, Huajie Village, Jinqian Village, Xinze Village, Tushe Village, Daqiaobian Village, Dayuan Village, Quanxin Village, Shiwan Village, Aixin Village, Dapingjie Village, and Shilongdian Village (东风村、铁马山村、湄水村、石灰堂村、观岭村、段家湾村、梅子坳村、白马村、河田村、盐井湾村、澎沙湾村、仙神寨村、苏龙村、茅仑村、大桥村、岳家村、建强村、四湾村、杨柳井村、吴湾村、光华村、龙华村、大枫村、金塘村、思诚村、大井村、印塘村、宋江村、石湾里村、戴家湾村、石峡村、段家村、麦园村、新园村、杨眉村、泽石村、花街村、进前村、新泽村、土畲村、大桥边村、大元村、全心村、柿湾村、爱心村、大坪街村、石龙殿村).
