= Yongfeng station =

Yongfeng station may refer to:

- Yongfeng station (Beijing)
- Yongfeng station (Chengdu)
