= Huamen, Shuangfeng =

Huamen Town 花门镇
- Town
- Location in Hunan
- Coordinates: 27°17′11″N 112°05′35″E
- Country: People's Republic of China
- Province: Hunan
- Prefecture-level city: Loudi
- County: Shuangfeng

Area
  - Total: 97 km^{2} (37 sq mi)

Population
  - Total: 61,000
  - Density: 630/km^{2} (1,600/sq mi)
- Time zone: UTC+8 (China Standard)
- Area code: 0738

Huamen Town (simplified Chinese: 花门镇; traditional Chinese: 花門鎮; pinyin: Huāmén Zhèn) is a Chinese town in Shuangfeng County, Hunan Province.

== Administrative divisions ==
The town is divided into 59 villages and 1 community, which include the following areas:

- Shuanglong Community
- Herui Village
- Chunshan Village
- Lijiang Village
- Yangmei Village
- Duanyan Village
- Shenhong Village
- Ouba Village
- Zhangshan Village
- Shanlin Village
- Fengzui Village
- Wayao Village
- Fucha Village
- Huanglong Village
- Longshan Village
- Changshan Village
- Huangshan Village
- Dashan Village
- Qiaoxin Village
- Hejian Village
- Renmin Village
- Minyi Village
- Qunxi Village
- Qinghua Village
- Xinmin Village
- Yinong Village
- Jianjiang Village
- Junshan Village
- Huamen Village
- Zhongping Village
- Qinghe Village
- Renhe Village
- Xingfu Village
- Hong'ai Village
- Zengjia Village
- Shizuilong Village
- Mingxing Village
- Chuqiao Village
- Xiashan Village
- Shiyu Village
- Guangqian Village
- Fujia Village
- Taizhou Village
- Zhujiang Village
- Changlian Village
- Shengli Village
- Pingtian Village
- Dawang Village
- Qingshan Village
- Qunlou Village
- Dongqiao Village
- Shuangquan Village
- Sheyi Village
- Zhoushangqiao Village
- Shanyuan Village
- Baotai Village
- Datuo Village
- Shilong Village
- Nanfang Village
- Daba Village
