= Yongfeng, Shuangfeng =

Yongfeng 永丰镇
- Town
- Location in Hunan
- Coordinates: 27°27′14″N 112°11′41″E
- Country: People's Republic of China
- Province: Hunan
- Prefecture-level city: Loudi
- County: Shuangfeng

Area
  - Total: 89.8 km^{2} (34.7 sq mi)

Population
  - Total: 44,430
  - Density: 495/km^{2} (1,280/sq mi)
- Time zone: UTC+8 (China Standard)
- Area code: 0738

Yongfeng (simplified Chinese: 永丰; traditional Chinese: 永豐; pinyin: Yǒngfēng) is a town in Shuangfeng County, Hunan, People's Republic of China.

The Chinese government in 2007 approved an application for Geographical Indication Products status for Yongfeng chili sauce, specifying the ingredients and their proportions for industrial production.

== Administrative division ==
The town is divided into 49 villages and 14 communities.
