= Li Yanrong =

Chinese chemist and materials scientist

- 李言荣

President of Sichuan University
- Incumbent
- Assumed office December 2017

Personal details
- Born: July 1961 (age 65) Shehong, Sichuan, China
- Education: Sichuan Normal University, Chinese Academy of Sciences

Li Yanrong is a Chinese chemist and materials scientist who is currently the President of Sichuan University. Previously, he was President of University of Electronic Science and Technology of China (UESTC). He is a chemical and materials engineer.

== Early life ==
Li was born in Shehong, Suining, Sichuan province in 1961. He graduated with a PhD degree from Changchun Institute of Applied Chemistry, Chinese Academy of Sciences, China in 1992. From 1978 - 1983, he studied his undergraduate degree at Sichuan Normal University, China in chemistry.

== Career ==
In 1993, he joined UESTC as a faculty member. From 1998 - 2001, he became Dean of the School of Material Engineering. Thereafter, he became Dean of the School of Microelectronics and Solid State Electronics. From 2013 - 2017, he became President of UESTC. Since December 2017, he has been the President of Sichuan University, China. In 2019, he was appointed the President of Sichuan Association of Science and Technology.

== Awards ==
Li was elected to the Chinese Academy of Engineering in 2011.
