= Santangpu =

Santangpu Town 三塘铺镇
- Town
- Location in Hunan
- Coordinates: 27°24′03″N 111°59′39″E
- Country: People's Republic of China
- Province: Hunan
- Prefecture-level city: Loudi
- district: Shuangfeng

Area
  - Total: 55 km^{2} (21 sq mi)

Population
  - Total: 48,000
  - Density: 870/km^{2} (2,300/sq mi)
- Time zone: UTC+8 (China Standard)
- Area code: 0738

Santangpu Town (simplified Chinese: 三塘铺镇; traditional Chinese: 三塘鋪鎮; pinyin: Sāntángpū Zhèn) is an urban town in Shuangfeng County, Hunan Province, People's Republic of China.

== Administrative divisions ==
The town is divided into 50 villages and 5 communities, which include the following areas:

- Xiangyang Community
- Xinyang Community
- Xinchao Community
- Xinjing Community
- Gaomuchong Community
- Gaofeng Village
- Changtian Village
- Huanghe Village
- Changchong Village
- Matijing Village
- Mangdanshi Village
- Fengshushan Village
- Shengyun Village
- Shipaishang Village
- Shibianqiao Village
- Bawan Village
- Jiazitang Village
- Shanchong Village
- Guangchong Village
- Zhengchong Village
- Fengmu Village
- Liu Village
- Daming Village
- Damachong Village
- Liujie Village
- Jiufangtou Village
- Liangtoutang Village
- Pingfeng Village
- Donghe Village
- Tantouwan Village
- Xinrong Village
- Chachong Village
- Dongsheng Village
- Jigongtang Village
- Dongfang Village
- Changjiang Village
- Sanxing Village
- Dafeng Village
- Santang Village
- Huoche Village
- Taosha Village
- Jihui Village
- Dayun Village
- Luotang Village
- Xiangsi Village
- Jinqiao Village
- Zhemu Village
- Songshan Village
- Xinjiang Village
- Huangzhou Village
- Chaoyang Village
- Huchong Village
- Xintian Village
- Huashang Village
- Yanquan Village
