= Guangxi campaign =

Military campaign in the Chinese civil war

- Part of Chinese Civil War
Date	October 31 – December 14, 1949
Location	Guangxi province
Result	Communist victory
Territorial changes	Guangxi captured by the PLA

Belligerents
People's Liberation Army	National Revolutionary Army

Commanders and leaders
(China) Lin Biao	(Taiwan) Bai Chongxi (Taiwan) Zhang Gan

Strength
14th Army, 15th Army and 43rd Army of PLA IV Corps (part of the Fourth Field Army) and Second Field Army	7th Army, 48th Army and 126th Army of NRA III Corps and NRA XI Corps

Casualties and losses
	60,000+

The Guangxi campaign was a campaign fought between the nationalists and the communists during the Chinese Civil War. It resulted in a victory for the communists and the capture of Guangxi province.

== Bobai campaign ==
After the nationalist offensive in the southern front had been defeated by the advance communist, Bai Chongxi ordered the nationalist III Corps and XI Corps to immediately retreat. The communist forces at the southern front consisted of units of the communist II Field Army and Fourth Field Army begun the pursuit on November 27, 1949. To boost morale, the nationalist commander-in-chief Zhang Gan (张淦) decided to be the last to retreat and his III Corps headquarters remained behind in the town of Bobai (博白), but this was detected by the attack communists in the afternoon of December 30, 1949. Two regiments of the communist 43rd Army was immediately dispatched to attack the town and reached the town by 8:00 PM on the same day. After breaching the defense of the town at the northern and eastern gates, the attacking communists managed to besiege the surviving nationalists at their corps headquarters located in the library building. After fierce street fights, the battle ended on 10:30 PM on December 30, 1949, with communist victory, and Zhang Gan (张淦), the nationalist commander-in-chief of the III Corps was captured alive with most of his staff. Meantime, the forces of the communist IV Corps from regions of Hua (化) county, and Zhangjiang (漳江) had badly mauled the 48th Army of the nationalist III Corps and then also approached the town of Bobai (博白).

While the communists were attacking the besieged the town of Bobai (博白), the nationalist commander-in-chief Zhang Gan (张淦) ordered the 7th Army, 48th Army and 126th Army of the III Corps to counterattack toward the town. In the early morning of December 1, 1949, the three nationalist armies had approached the town of Bobai (博白), but as the nationalists learned that their corps headquarters had been annihilated and their commander-in-chief was captured alive by the enemy, the nationalist morale collapsed. Taking the advantage of the situation, the communist 43rd Army, 14th Army and 15th Army immediately launched an offensive against the three nationalist armies, and by 3:00 pm, the campaign concluded with the most of nationalists killed or captured.

The communist victory of the Bobai campaign (博白战役) resulted in the near total annihilation of the nationalist III Corps, with the exception of a portion of nationalist 126th Army successfully retreating westward. The loss of the nationalist III Corps resulted in the further weakening of the nationalist defense in Guangxi while the communist victory of the Guangxi campaign was further guaranteed.

== See also ==
- Outline of the Chinese Civil War
- Outline of the military history of the People's Republic of China
- National Revolutionary Army
- History of the People's Liberation Army
