= Zeng Yi (painter) =

Chinese painter (born 1957)

- Traditional Chinese: 曾毅
- Simplified Chinese: 曾毅
Transcriptions
Standard Mandarin
- Hanyu Pinyin: Zēng Yì

Zeng Yi (born 1957) is a professional painter specialized in oil painting.

== Accomplishments ==
Mr. Zeng was born in Neijiang, Sichuan Province, China. His paintings were published in many fine art magazines such as Chinese Oil Painting, Art Panorama and other newspapers. He have taught for more than 20 years in Art and Design Department in universities as well.

- 2005 Participant Beijing Art Expo.
- 2006 Chengdu Television interviewed and reported his artworks of Maidservant Beside Lotus Pool Series.
- 2008 Participant Sir Ka-shing Li Autumn Auction， the works - Maidservant Beside Lotus Pool Series stroke a bargain.
- 2011 Invited to participate Shanghai Spring Art Exposition.

After 2009, he frequently traveled to U.S. to participate art exhibitions and painting sessions. His paintings were also collected by the Chinese American Museum.

His work has been praised by many foreign collectors. Jin Rui, a famous painter, pondered on the rich connotations and charms of most traditional Chinese characters from Yi's works. Then he wrote an article "The Fallen of Flowers Dancing in the Sky Behold Floating Like a Dream- What I found in Yi's Oil Painting" for him.
