= Heye, Shuangfeng =

Heye Town 荷叶镇
- Town
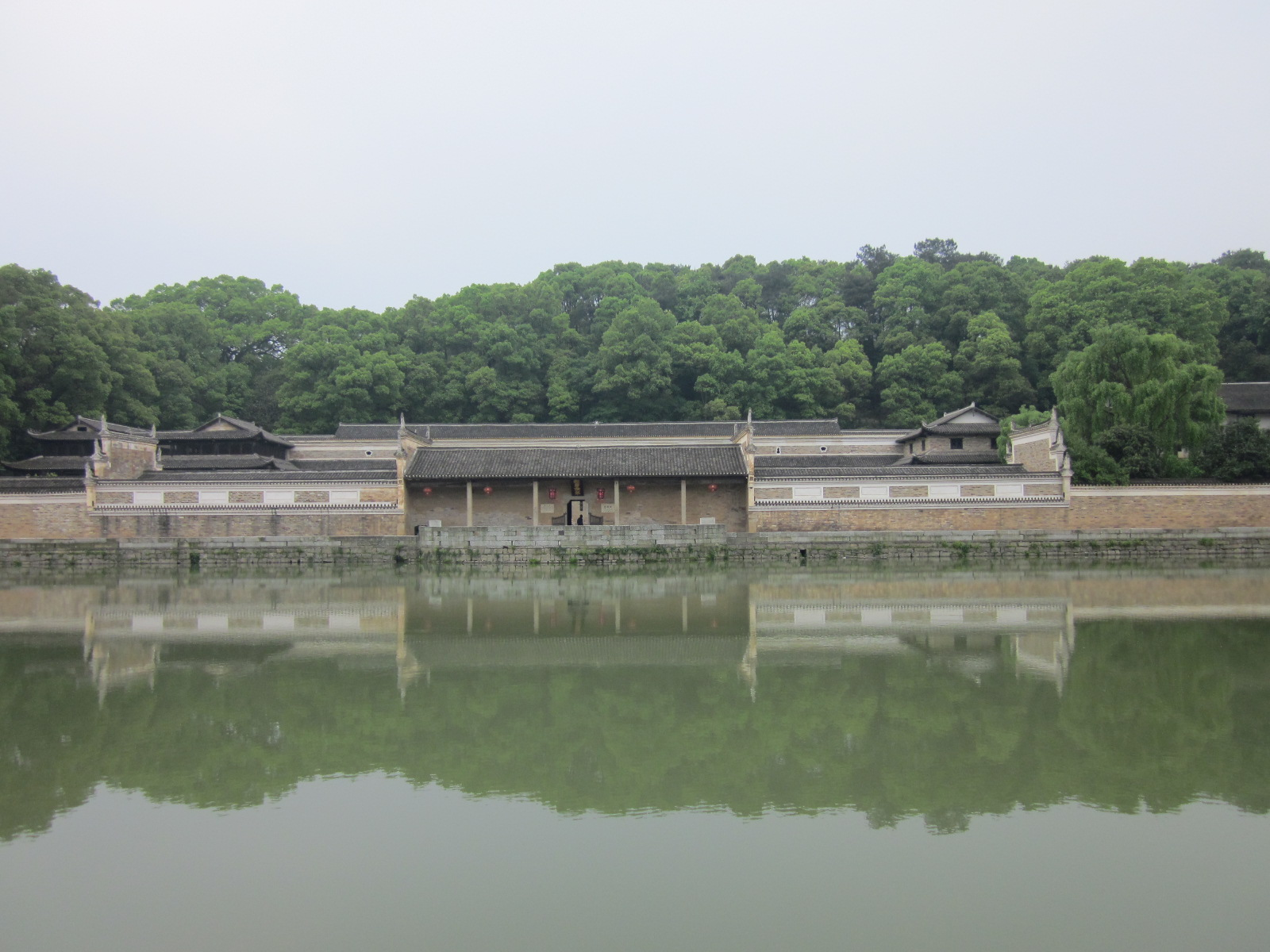
- Frontal view of the Former Residence of Zeng Guofan.

- Location in Hunan
- Coordinates: 27°24′36″N 112°26′47″E
- Country: People's Republic of China
- Province: Hunan
- Prefecture-level city: Loudi
- County: Shuangfeng

Area
  - Total: 140.89 km^{2} (54.40 sq mi)

Population
  - Total: 51,900
  - Density: 368/km^{2} (954/sq mi)
- Time zone: UTC+8 (China Standard)
- Postal code: 417712
- Area code: 0738
- Website: www.hnsf.gov.cn/hyzrmzf/

Heye Town (simplified Chinese: 荷叶镇; traditional Chinese: 荷葉鎮; pinyin: Héyè Zhèn) is a rural town in Shuangfeng County, Hunan Province, People's Republic of China. The town is bordered to the north by Jingzi Town, to the northeast by Shigu Town of Xiangtan County, to the southeast by Xinqiao Town of Hengshan County, to the west by Shiniu Township, and to the south by Xijiang Township of Hengyang County.

== History ==
On 14 October 2016, the town was listed among the first group of "Distinctive Towns in China" by the National Development and Reform Commission, Ministry of Finance and Ministry of Housing and Urban–Rural Development.

== Administrative divisions ==
The town is divided into 63 villages and 1 community, which include the following areas: Hejia'ao Community, Shaxi Village, Fengtian Village, Mupi Village, Shipai Village, Zhumu Village, Shiyu Village, Jinyu Village, Longyin Village, Fengming Village, Shenchong Village, Niyu Village, Dasheng Village, Xinmin Village, Qiaojia Village, Tianping Village, Guihua Village, Hetang Village, Jianshe Village, Hengmu Village, Haiqiu Village, Xingqiu Village, Shuangjiang Village, Qingquan Village, Youshui Village, Lianmeng Village, Fengshi Village, Hongri Village, Yongzhen Village, Haosheng Village, Shuanghe Village, Futuo Village, Shilin Village, Xinyao Village, Hecun Village, Tangjia Village, Xingao Village, Shangxin Village, Taiyuan Village, Dangxian Village, Jinfeng Village, Xiashi Village, Baini Village, Jianshi Village, Daping Village, Jiangbian Village, Jiufeng Village, Liangjiang Village, Lianshi Village, Huabei Village, Shihu Village, Nitang Village, Shiyuan Village, Hanpo Village, Xiangxing Village, Xiao Village, Xinjian Village, Yijiaping Village, Heye Village, Yuefei Village, Zhengjiang Village, and Huangteng Village (社区：贺家坳；村：沙溪、丰田、木皮、石牌、珠目、石鱼、金鱼、龙吟、凤鸣、神冲、泥鱼、大胜、新民、桥桂、天坪、桂华、荷塘、建设、横木、海秋、星球、双江、清泉、攸永、联盟、丰石、石塘、红日、永镇、长塘、豪胜、双合、富托、石林、新耀、禾村、汤佳、新高、上新、太源、当先、金凤、硖石、白泥、尖石、大坪、江边、九峰、良江、联石、花贝、石虎、泥塘、狮院、寒坡、象形、小村、新建、益嘉坪、荷叶、岳飞、正江、黄腾).

== Transportation ==
Provincial Highway S314 passes across the town north to southeast.

== Attractions ==
Former Residence of Zeng Guofan is a famous scenic spot in China.

== Notable people ==
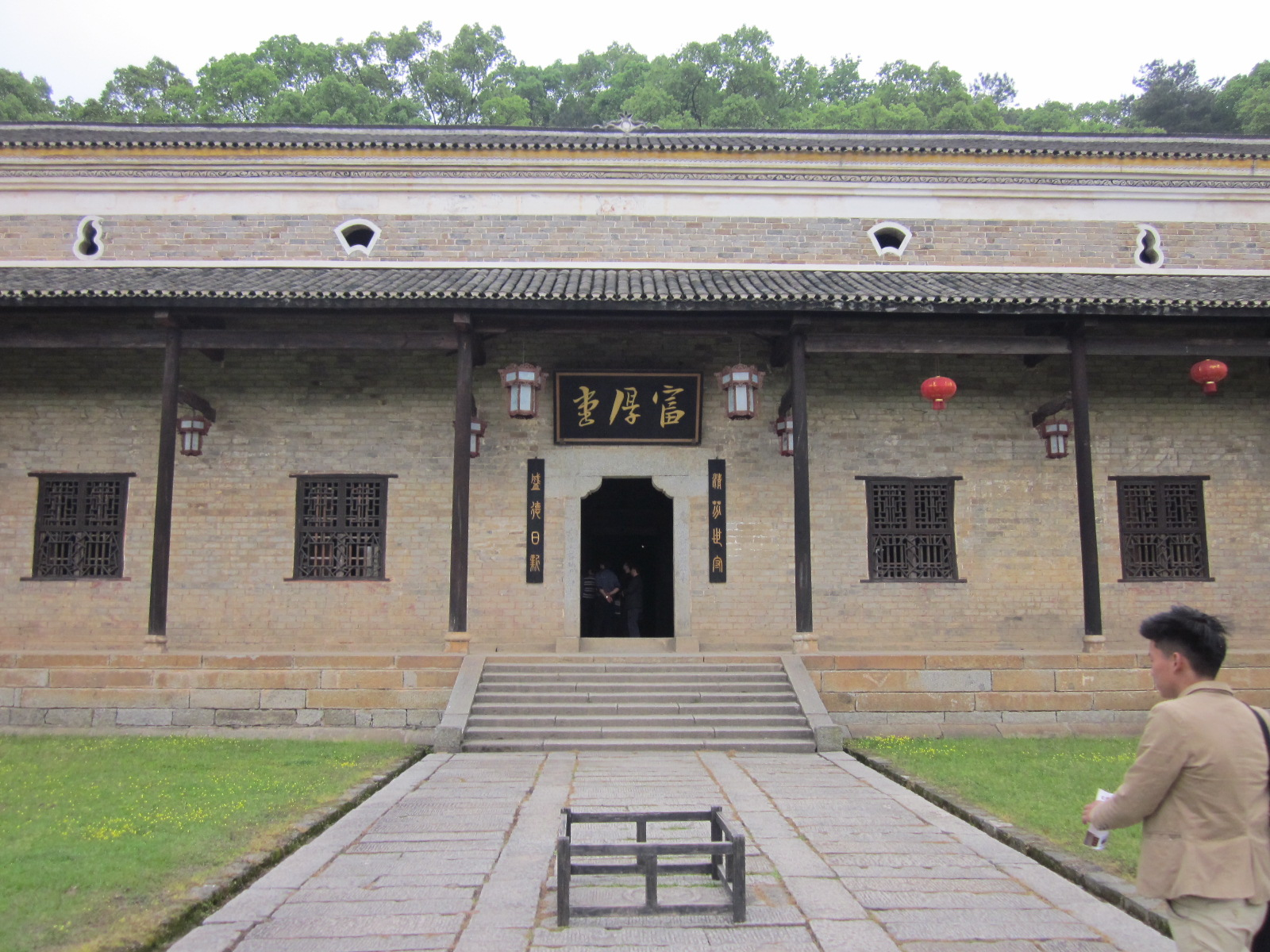
Fuhou Mansion at the Former Residence of Zeng Guofan.

- Jiang Wan (蒋琬; 蔣琬), politician.
- Zeng Guofan (曾国藩; 曾國藩), politician.
- Qiu Jin (秋瑾), revolutionist.
- Tang Qunying (唐群英), revolutionist.
- Ge Jianhao (葛健豪), scientist.
- Xiang Jingyu (向警予), revolutionist.
- Wang Caozhi (王灿芝; 王燦芝), revolutionist.
