= Qingshuping =

Qingshuping Town 青树坪镇
- Town
- Location in Hunan
- Coordinates: 27°23′05″N 112°01′19″E
- Country: People's Republic of China
- Province: Hunan
- Prefecture-level city: Loudi
- district: Shuangfeng

Area
  - Total: 97 km^{2} (37 sq mi)

Population
  - Total: 62,800
  - Density: 650/km^{2} (1,700/sq mi)
- Time zone: UTC+8 (China Standard)
- Area code: 0738

Qingshuping Town (simplified Chinese: 青树坪镇; traditional Chinese: 青樹坪鎮; pinyin: Qīngshùpíng Zhèn) is an urban town in Shuangfeng County, Hunan Province, People's Republic of China.

== Administrative divisions ==
The town is divided into 64 villages and 2 communities, including:

- Qingshu Community
- Laitoushan Village
- Qingshuping Village
- Qinglong Village
- Hongxing Village
- Congfeng Village
- Jincheng Village
- Congyi Village
- Quanjie Village
- Congde Village
- Jiansheng Village
- Xunmin Village
- Ceshi Village
- Dalian Village
- Shuangtian Village
- Renhe Village
- Hexin Village
- Lishan Village
- Shanjiajing Village
- Shuitian Village
- Xingwang Village
- Tiandang Village
- Weixin Village
- Weixing Village
- Wangri Village
- Huangtian Village
- Wuxing Village
- Jietang Village
- Daxin Village
- Jiefeng Village
- Jiepai Village
- Sanlian Village
- Yumin Village
- Zhuhua Village
- Huaguo Village
- Shuanghua Village
- Jingchu Village
- Yejia Village
- Nongjia Village
- Gaoxing Village
- Shizijiang Village
- Hongquan Village
- Jianquan Village
- Jianlou Village
- Dapingli Village
- Fanxin Village
- Xinshi Village
- Gongtong Village
- Yangtang Village
- Shili Village
- Xianghua Village
- Zhongwang Village
- Zhongxin Village
- Chayuan'ao Village
- Renxing Village
- Laotian Village
- Minxing Village
- Yinshen Village
- Liangyi Village
- Guangyi Village
- Guangyi Village
- Changle Village
- Daquan Village
- Jinsha Village
- Jinling Village
- Fanping Village
