= Shuangfeng County =

Shuangfeng County 双峰县
- County
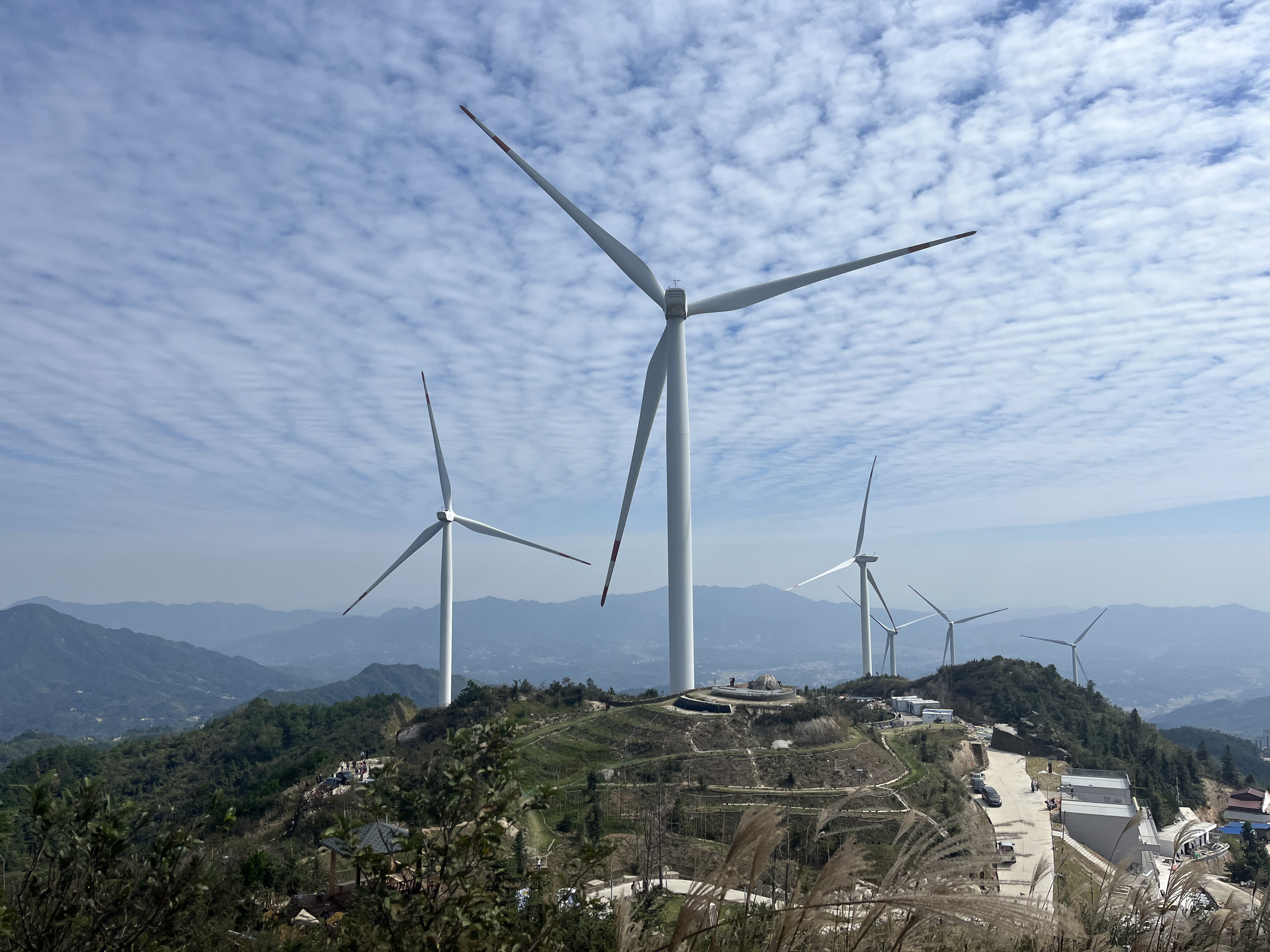

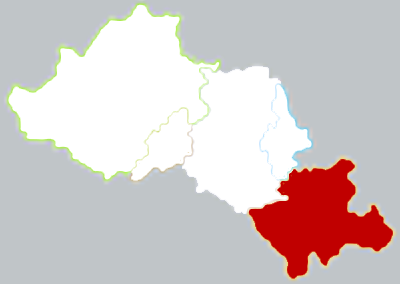
- Location of Shuangfeng County within Loudi

- Location in Hunan
- Coordinates: 27°27′07″N 112°12′07″E
- Country: People's Republic of China
- Province: Hunan
- Prefecture-level city: Loudi

Area
  - Total: 1,596 km^{2} (616 sq mi)

Population (2017)
  - Total: 894,000
  - Density: 560/km^{2} (1,450/sq mi)
- Time zone: UTC+8 (China Standard)
- Postal code: 4172XX

Shuangfeng County (simplified Chinese: 双峰县; traditional Chinese: 雙峰縣; pinyin: Shuāngfēng Xiàn; lit. 'double peak') is a county in Hunan Province, China. It is under the administration of Loudi prefecture-level City.

Located on the east central part of the province, it is adjacent to the southeast of the city proper of Loudi. The county is bordered to the north and northeast by Xiangxiang City, to the southeast by Xiangtan and Hengshan Counties, to the south by Hengyang County, to the southwest by Shaodong County, and to the northwest by Lianyuan City and Louxing District. Shuangfeng County covers an area of 1,715 km^{2} (662 sq mi), and as of the 2010 census, it had a registered population of 941,792 and a resident population of 854,555. The county has 12 towns and 3 townships under its jurisdiction, and the county seat is Yongfeng (永丰镇).

== History ==
The county of Shuangfeng was formed from the south western portion of Xiangxiang County in January 1952, named after the Shuangfeng Mountain (双峰山). At its establishment, it was a county of Yiyang Prefecture (益阳专区), it was transferred to Shaoyang Prefecture (邵阳专区) in December 1952. Lianyuan Prefecture (涟源地区) was formed from a portion of Shaoyang Prefecture (邵阳地区) in September 1977, it became a county of Lianyuan Prefecture. The prefecture of Lianyuan was renamed to Loudi (娄底地区) in 1982, the prefecture of Loudi was reorganized as the prefecture-level city of Loudi (娄底市), the county of Shuangfeng is under the administration of Loudi City.

Shexingshan Town was transferred to Louxing District on January 24, 2017. The county of Shuangfeng covers an area of 1,596 km^{2} (616 sq mi) with a population of 894,000 (as of 2017). It has 12 towns and 3 townships under jurisdiction.

== Climate ==
Climate data for Shuangfeng, elevation 100 m (330 ft), (1991–2020 normals, extremes 1981–2010)
Month	Jan	Feb	Mar	Apr	May	Jun	Jul	Aug	Sep	Oct	Nov	Dec	Year
Record high °C (°F)	27.8 (82.0)	30.6 (87.1)	34.7 (94.5)	35.9 (96.6)	36.6 (97.9)	37.8 (100.0)	39.7 (103.5)	40.8 (105.4)	38.1 (100.6)	34.8 (94.6)	32.4 (90.3)	24.8 (76.6)	40.8 (105.4)
Mean daily maximum °C (°F)	9.1 (48.4)	12.0 (53.6)	16.2 (61.2)	22.8 (73.0)	27.4 (81.3)	30.4 (86.7)	33.8 (92.8)	33.2 (91.8)	29.1 (84.4)	23.7 (74.7)	18.0 (64.4)	11.9 (53.4)	22.3 (72.1)
Daily mean °C (°F)	5.2 (41.4)	7.7 (45.9)	11.7 (53.1)	17.8 (64.0)	22.4 (72.3)	26.0 (78.8)	29.0 (84.2)	28.3 (82.9)	24.1 (75.4)	18.5 (65.3)	12.7 (54.9)	7.2 (45.0)	17.6 (63.6)
Mean daily minimum °C (°F)	2.5 (36.5)	4.8 (40.6)	8.5 (47.3)	14.1 (57.4)	18.7 (65.7)	22.6 (72.7)	25.2 (77.4)	24.6 (76.3)	20.4 (68.7)	14.9 (58.8)	9.1 (48.4)	3.9 (39.0)	14.1 (57.4)
Record low °C (°F)	−7.6 (18.3)	−8.5 (16.7)	−2.7 (27.1)	0.7 (33.3)	9.3 (48.7)	13.3 (55.9)	18.1 (64.6)	17.8 (64.0)	10.7 (51.3)	1.6 (34.9)	−2.4 (27.7)	−11.7 (10.9)	−11.7 (10.9)
Average precipitation mm (inches)	72.2 (2.84)	76.3 (3.00)	140.9 (5.55)	158.4 (6.24)	198.1 (7.80)	209.3 (8.24)	138.4 (5.45)	109.8 (4.32)	71.7 (2.82)	69.2 (2.72)	76.1 (3.00)	53.9 (2.12)	1,374.3 (54.1)
Average precipitation days (≥ 0.1 mm)	13.9	14.0	18.2	17.5	16.2	14.8	10.1	10.6	8.6	9.4	10.5	11.0	154.8
Average snowy days	4.2	2.6	0.8	0	0	0	0	0	0	0	0.2	1.6	9.4
Average relative humidity (%)	80	80	81	80	79	81	75	76	77	77	79	77	79
Mean monthly sunshine hours	55.1	55.5	71.2	101.1	128.6	132.5	224.7	195.2	148.8	125.0	109.6	88.9	1,436.2
Percentage possible sunshine	17	17	19	26	31	32	53	49	41	35	34	28	32
Source: China Meteorological Administration (precipitation days, snow days, sunshine 1991–2020)

== Subdivisions ==
Shexingshan Town was transferred to Louxing District on January 24, 2017. It has 12 towns and townships.

12 towns

- Gantang (Chinese: 甘棠镇)
- Heye (Chinese: 荷叶镇)
- Hongshandian (Chinese: 洪山殿镇)
- Huamen (Chinese: 花门镇)
- Jingzi (Chinese: 井字镇)
- Qingshuping (Chinese: 青树坪镇)
- Santangpu (Chinese: 三塘铺镇)
- Suoshi (Chinese: 锁石镇)
- Xingzipu (Chinese: 杏子铺镇)
- Yongfeng (Chinese: 永丰镇)
- Zimenqiao (Chinese: 梓门桥镇)
- Zoumajie (Chinese: 走马街镇)

3 townships

- Shatang (Chinese: 沙塘乡)
- Shiniu (Chinese: 石牛乡)
- Yintang (Chinese: 印塘乡)

== Education ==
- Shuangfeng County No. 1 High School

== Tourism ==
Shuangfeng County is home to the Former Residence of Zeng Guofan.

== Notable people ==
- Deng Qidong, geologist.
- Ge Jianhao (葛健豪), scientist.
- Jiang Wan, politician.
- Qiu Jin, revolutionist.
- Tang Qunying, revolutionist.
- Wang Caozhi (王灿芝; 王燦芝), revolutionist.
- Xiang Jingyu, revolutionist.
- Zeng Guofan, statesman, military general, and Confucian scholar of the late Qing dynasty.
