= Lengshuijiang Subdistrict =

Lengshuijiang Subdistrict 冷水江街道
- Subdistrict
- Location in Hunan
- Coordinates: 27°41′40″N 111°26′00″E
- Country: People's Republic of China
- Province: Hunan
- Prefecture-level city: Loudi
- County-level city: Lengshuijiang

Area
  - Total: 15.9 km^{2} (6.1 sq mi)

Population (2015)
  - Total: 81,200
  - Density: 5,110/km^{2} (13,200/sq mi)
- Time zone: UTC+8 (China Standard)
- Postal code: 417500
- Area code: 0738

Lengshuijiang (Chinese: 冷水江街道; pinyin: Lěngshuǐjiāng Jiēdào) is an urban subdistrict and the seat of Lengshuijiang City in Hunan, China. The subdistrict is located in the west central part of the city. It is bordered by Shatangwan Subdistrict to the east and southeast, Buxi Subdistrict to the south and southwest, Zhonglian Township to the northwest and north. It has an area of 15.9 km^{2} (6.1 sq mi) with a population of 81,200 (2015 end).

== History ==
In September 1981, Lengshuijiang Subdistrict was reorganized from the historic Lengshuijiang Town (冷水江镇) which was formed in June 1950. The town was a part of Zhonglian Commune (中连公社) in the people's commune movement in 1958; dividing a part of the former Zhonglian Commune, Wiyi City People's Commune (五一城市人民公社) was established in 1961. Wiyi City People's Commune was reorganized to Lengshuijiang Town in January 1963, the town once again was changed to Lengjiang Commune (冷江公社) in 1968 and the commune was reformed to Lengshuijiang Town in the next year.

== Administrative divisions ==
The subdistrict is divided into 11 communities and 4 villages, which include the following areas:

- Tidu Community (锑都居委会)
- Xinqiao Community (新桥居委会)
- Jianxin Community (建新居委会)
- Lengjin Community (冷金居委会)
- Lengxi Community (冷锡居委会)
- Lengxin Community (冷新居委会)
- Lengyuan Community (冷园居委会)
- Lenggang Community (冷钢居委会)
- Lianxiqiao Community (涟溪桥居委会)
- Shitang Community (施塘居委会)
- Hongri Community (红日居委会)
- Tongxin Village (同心村)
- Baiyang Village (白杨村)
- Baishi Village (白石村)
- Yongxing Village (永兴村)

== Geography ==
Zi River, also known as the mother river, flows through the subdistrict.

== Transportation ==
=== Provincial Highway ===
The subdistrict is connected to Provincial Highway S312, which heads northwest to Xinhua County and southeast to Shatangwan Subdistrict and Jinzhushan Town.

=== Railway ===
The Shanghai–Kunming railway, from Shanghai to Kunming, southwest China's Yunnan province, through the subdistrict.
