= Lianshao Mining Bureau =

Chinese coal mining enterprise

Lianshao Mining Bureau (simplified Chinese: 涟邵矿务局; traditional Chinese: 漣邵礦務局; pinyin: Liánshào Kuàngwùjú) was a large state-owned enterprise in China that mainly produced coal. It was headquartered in Loudi City, Hunan Province, and its mining areas are distributed in Loudi, Xiangtan, and Shaoyang. At its peak time, the population of the mining area reached 160,000, with nearly 50,000 employees. The normal annual coal output was about 2.7 million tons, and the highest annual output in history reached 3.3 million tons. In 2006 it became part of the Hunan Coal Group.

== Subordinate units ==
Lianshao Mining Bureau had jurisdiction over the following units:

=== Coal mining enterprises ===
- Niumasi Coal Mine (牛马司煤矿),
- Qiaotouhe Coal Mine (桥头河煤矿),
- Jinzhushan Coal Mine (金竹山煤矿),
- Hongshandian Coal Mine (洪山殿煤矿),
- Doulishan Coal Mine (斗笠山煤矿),
- Chaoyang Coal Mine (朝阳煤矿),
- Limin Coal Mine (利民煤矿),
- Enkou Coal Mine (恩口煤矿),
- Lumaojiang Coal Mine (芦茅江煤矿),
- Lengshuijiang Coal Mine (冷水江煤矿),
- First Engineering Division (第一工程处),
- Second Engineering Division (第二工程处).

=== Production auxiliary units ===
- Machinery factory,
- Cement factory,
- Geological survey and exploration team;

=== Hospitals and schools ===
- Staff hospitals for each mine
- Bureau general hospital,
- Staff university,
- Technical school,
- Elementary and middle schools for children of the employees.

== History ==
Lianshao Mining Bureau was founded in May 1959. From a few pairs of small mining wells, where coal workers carried coal on shoulder poles, it developed into a large national enterprise with a complete range of survey, design, production, construction, and machinery manufacturing.

In 2001, the coal mines of Chaoyang, Doulishan, Qiaotouhe and Lumaojiang went bankrupt and were transferred to local governments. The rest of the Bureau was built into the wholly state-owned Lianshao Mining Group Co., Ltd. directly under the Ministry of the Coal Industry of the Chinese central government.

In 2006, the Hunan Provincial Government integrated Lianshao Mining Group Co., Ltd., Zixing Mining Group Co., Ltd., Baisha Coal and Electricity Group Co., Ltd., Changsha Mining Group Co., Ltd., Xiangtan Mining Group Co., Ltd. and Chenxi Coal Mine altogether six coal mining enterprises and formed the Hunan Provincial Coal Industry Group Co., Ltd. (shortly as "Xiangmei Group"). The three companies of Niumasi, Jinzhushan and Hongshandian under the jurisdiction of the former Lianshao Mining Bureau were placed under the direct management of the new group. And the other departments were reorganized into the Lianshao Mining Area Safety Production Administration Bureau and Lianshao Industrial Company.
