= Xikuangshan, Lengshuijiang =

Xikuangshan Subdistrict 锡矿山街道
- Subdistrict
- Location in Hunan
- Coordinates: 27°44′41″N 111°28′06″E
- Country: People's Republic of China
- Province: Hunan
- Prefecture-level city: Loudi
- County-level city: Lengshuijiang

Area
  - Total: 67.05 km^{2} (25.89 sq mi)

Population (2015)
  - Total: 30,500
  - Density: 455/km^{2} (1,180/sq mi)
- Time zone: UTC+8 (China Standard)
- Postal code: 417500
- Area code: 0738

Xikuangshan Subdistrict (simplified Chinese: 锡矿山街道; traditional Chinese: 錫礦山街道; pinyin: Xīkuàngshān Jiēdào) is an urban subdistrict in Lengshuijiang, Loudi City, Hunan Province, People's Republic of China. As of the 2015 census it had a population of 30,500 and an area of 67.05 square kilometres (25.89 sq mi).

== History ==
In 2015, Kuangshan Township was merged into Xikuangshan Subdistrict.

== Administrative divisions ==
The subdistrict is divided into 8 communities, which include the following areas: Changlongjie Community, Guangrong Community, Lianmeng Community, Qilijiang Community, Qixing Community, Taotang Community, Yanshanhong Community, and Shuangmu Community (长龙界社区、光荣社区、联盟社区、七里江社区、七星社区、陶塘社区、艳山红社区、双木社区).
