= Duoshan, Lengshuijiang =

Duoshan Town 铎山镇
- Town
- Location in Hunan
- Coordinates: 27°40′12″N 111°35′26″E
- Country: People's Republic of China
- Province: Hunan
- Prefecture-level city: Loudi
- County-level city: Lengshuijiang

Area
  - Total: 52.29 km^{2} (20.19 sq mi)

Population (2015)
  - Total: 47,300
  - Density: 905/km^{2} (2,340/sq mi)
- Time zone: UTC+8 (China Standard)
- Postal code: 417508
- Area code: 0738

Duoshan Town (simplified Chinese: 铎山镇; traditional Chinese: 鐸山鎮; pinyin: Duóshān Zhèn) is a rural town in Lengshuijiang, Loudi City, Hunan Province, People's Republic of China. As of the 2015 census it had a population of 47,300 and an area of 52.29 square kilometres (20.19 sq mi).

== History ==
In 2015, Yankou Town was merged into Duoshan Town.

== Administrative divisions ==
The town is divided into 17 villages and 1 community, which include the following areas: Duoshan Community, Beiyuan Village, Chengshan Village, Daping Village, Helin Village, Huaqiao Village, Longguang Village, Longtanshan Village, Meishan Village, Qinglong Village, Shiwan Village, Shixi Village, Shizhu Village, Tangxi Village, Wangjia Village, Xianyi Village, Xinfeng Village, and Xintai Village (铎山社区、北元村、城山村、大坪村、合林村、花桥村、龙光村、龙潭山村、眉山村、青龙村、石湾村、石溪村、石柱村、塘溪村、王家村、咸宜村、新枫村、新台村).

== Transportation ==
The Provincial Highway S312, commonly abbreviated as "S312", is a northeast–southwest highway passing through the town.
