= Zhadu, Lengshuijiang =

Zhadu Town 渣渡镇
- Town
- Location in Hunan
- Coordinates: 27°43′25″N 111°34′16″E
- Country: People's Republic of China
- Province: Hunan
- Prefecture-level city: Loudi
- County-level city: Lengshuijiang

Area
  - Total: 74.97 km^{2} (28.95 sq mi)

Population (2015)
  - Total: 32,000
  - Density: 430/km^{2} (1,100/sq mi)
- Time zone: UTC+8 (China Standard)
- Postal code: 417500
- Area code: 0738

Zhadu Town (simplified Chinese: 渣渡镇; traditional Chinese: 渣渡鎮; pinyin: Zhādù Zhèn) is a rural town in Lengshuijiang, Loudi City, Hunan Province, People's Republic of China. As of the 2015 census it had a population of 32,000 and an area of 74.97 square kilometres (28.95 sq mi).

== History ==
In 2015, Zilong Township was merged into Zhadu Town.

== Administrative divisions ==
The town is divided into 13 villages and 2 communities, which include the following areas: Zhadu Community, Mufeng Community, Chaishan Village, Dishui Village, Fuxing Village, Heping Village, Houjia Village, Limin Village, Mugua Village, Shangtie Village, Shuangfeng Village, Tieshan Village, Yinxi Village, Zhadu Village, and Zifang Village (渣渡社区、木丰社区、柴山村、滴水村、复兴村、和平村、候家村、利民村、木瓜村、上铁村、双丰村、铁山村、银溪村、渣渡村、梓芳村).

== Geography ==
The New Lian River (新涟河) flows through the town north to southeast.
