= Heqing, Lengshuijiang =

Heqing Town 禾青镇
- Town
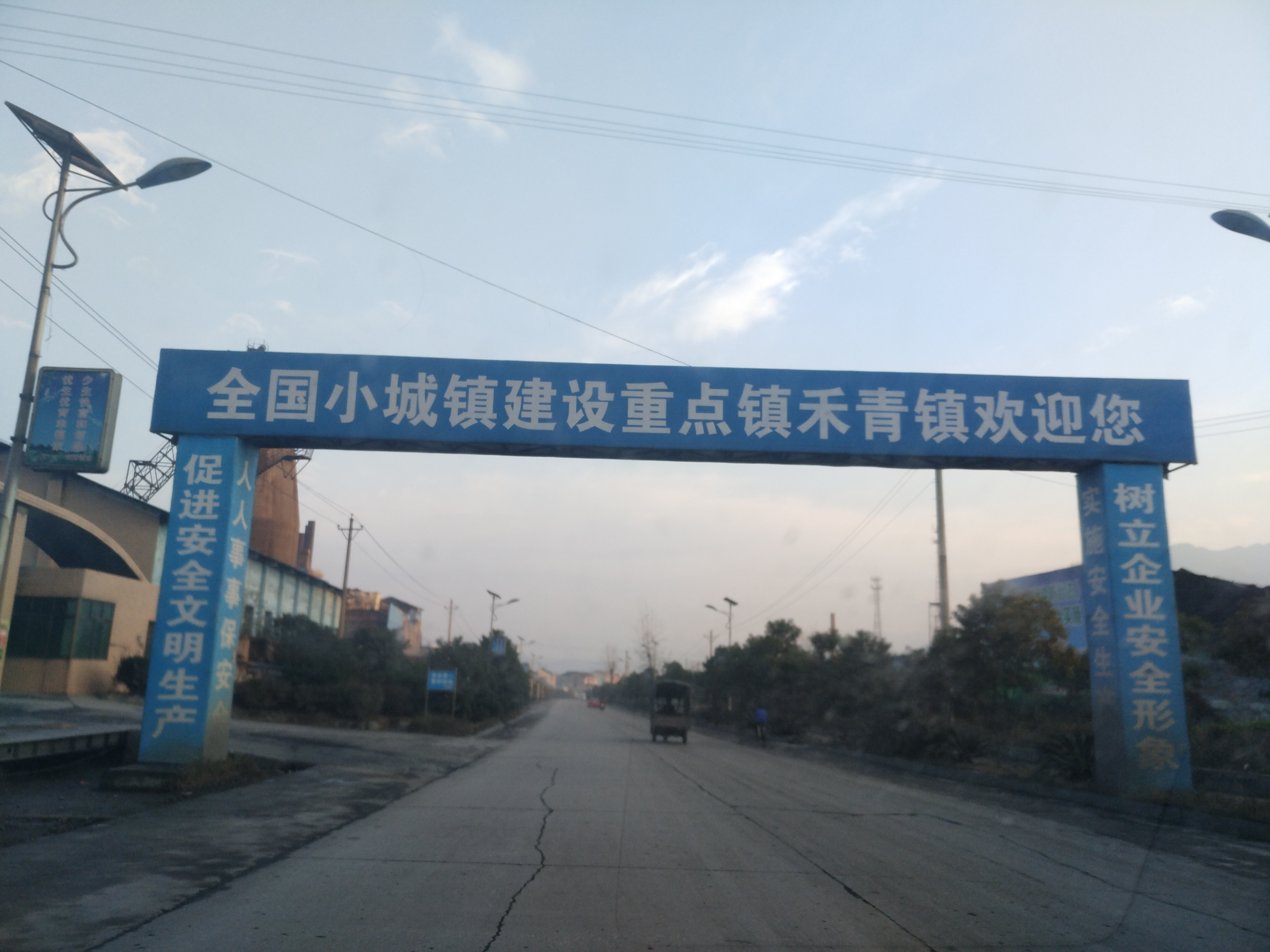
- A road lead to Heqing

- Location in Hunan.
- Coordinates: 27°36′39″N 111°25′33″E
- Country: People's Republic of China
- Province: Hunan
- Prefecture-level city: Loudi
- County-level city: Lengshuijiang

Area
  - Total: 44.44 km^{2} (17.16 sq mi)

Population (2017)
  - Total: 38,614
  - Density: 868.9/km^{2} (2,250/sq mi)
- Time zone: UTC+08:00 (China Standard)
- Postal code: 417506
- Area code: 0738

Heqing Town (simplified Chinese: 禾青镇; traditional Chinese: 禾青鎮; pinyin: Héqīng Zhèn) is a rural town in Lengshuijiang, Hunan, China. As of the 2017 census it had a population of 38,614 and an area of 44.44 square kilometres (17.16 sq mi).

== Administrative divisions ==
The town is divided into 22 villages and 4 communities, which include the following areas:

- Baoxing Community (宝兴社区)
- Lifu Community (里福社区)
- Qiuxi Community (球溪社区)
- Shuangxing Community (双星社区)
- Heqing Village (禾青村)
- Hexing Village (禾兴村)
- Huangni Village (黄泥村)
- Shuangxing Village (双星村)
- Lifu Village (里福村)
- Yangping Village (杨坪村)
- Huangchang Village (黄场村)
- Qiuxi Village (球溪村)
- Shexueli Village (社学里村)
- Ruijiang Village (湍江村)
- Luzhu Village (炉竹村)
- Liuli Village (刘李村)
- Dongshang Village (硐上村)
- Shuitang Village (税塘村)
- Changchong Village (长冲村)
- Miaotian Village (苗田村)
- Tongzhong Village (铜钟村)
- Maoshan Village (茂山村)
- Shishan Village (石山村)
- Qiaotou Village (桥头村)
- Hongyun Village (洪云村)
- Jianxin Village (建新村)

== Geography ==
Zi River, also known as the mother river, flows through the town.

== Transportation ==
=== Expressway ===
The S70 Loudi–Huaihua Expressway, more commonly known as "Louhuai Expressway", is a west-east highway passing through the town.

=== Railway ===
The Shanghai–Kunming high-speed railway passes across the town southeast to northwest.
