= Lengshuijiang East railway station =

Railway station in Lengshuijiang, China

Coordinates: 27.6617°N 111.4615°E

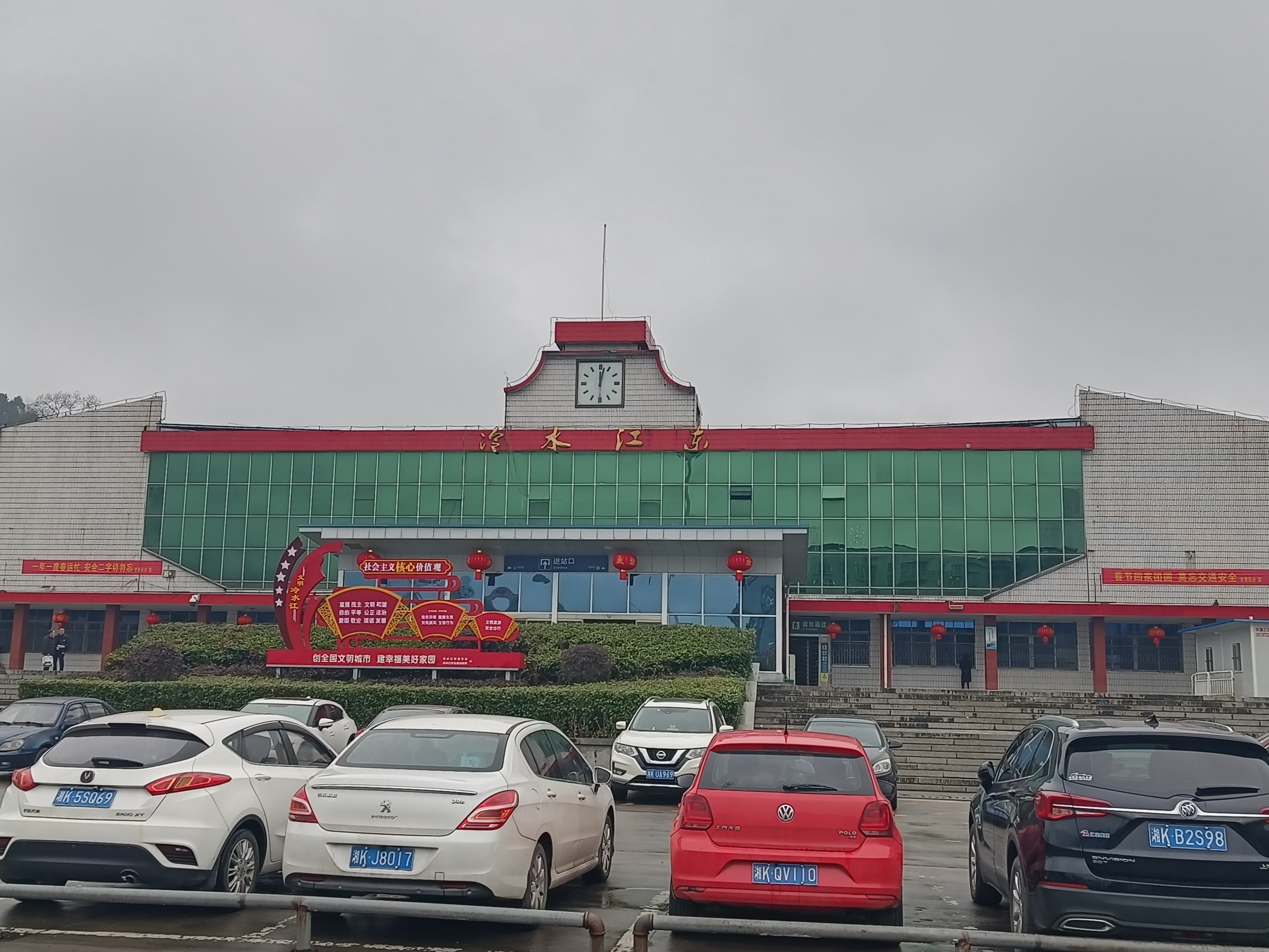
Front of Lengshuijiang East railway station

Lengshuijiang East railway station (Chinese: 冷水江东站) is a third-class railway station in Lengshuijiang, Loudi, Hunan on the Shanghai–Kunming railway. It was built in 1961 and is under the jurisdiction of China Railway Guangzhou Group.

Preceding station	China Railway	Following station
Lianyuan towards Shanghai or Shanghai South	Shanghai–Kunming railway	Xinhua towards Kunming
