= Niumasi Coal Mine =

Coal mine in Shaodong, Shaoyang, China

Niumasi Coal Mine (simplified Chinese: 牛马司煤矿; traditional Chinese: 牛馬司煤礦; pinyin: Niúmǎsī Méikuàng), new name Niumasi Mining Co., Ltd. (牛马司矿业有限公司; 牛馬司礦業有限公司), is located in Shaodong, Shaoyang City, Hunan Province of China. It is a county-level state-owned enterprise directly under the provincial government, and has a history of more than 200 years outputting quality coal to produce coke.

== Early stage companies ==
Niumasi started coal mining more than 200 years ago. During the Guangxu period of the Qing Dynasty, a total of 88 tube wells (production lifting mine shaft) and 27 Makou wells (drainage wells) were developed, with the deepest reaching 338 meters. In the tenth year of Guangxu's reign (1884), the local Mayuanbian coal mine successfully used local methods to make coke. Since then, many coal mines were built in the territory for coking. During the period of Republic of China, 13 joint venture companies including Henry and Changfeng were successively established, operating a total of 301 tube wells and 71 Makou wells.

== Niumasi Coal Mine ==
After the founding of the People's Republic of China in 1949, Niumasi's private coal mines were successively taken over by the government. In 1951, Changfeng Coal Mine Co., Ltd., the largest coal mine, was renamed Niumasi Coal Mine and became the first local state-owned coal mine in Shaoyang. After that, other local coal mines gradually joined Niumasi Coal Mine. In 1959, Niumasi Coal Mine was placed under the jurisdiction of Lianshao Mining Bureau (涟邵矿务局; 漣邵礦務局). At the beginning of the Cultural Revolution in 1966, Niumasi Coal Mine was renamed "Chiwei Coal Mine" (赤卫煤矿; 赤衛煤礦; 'Red Guard Coal Mine'), and in August 1978, it was renamed back to Niumasi Coal Mine.

From 1953 to 1971, Niumasi Coal Mine successively built 6 pairs of large mine wells, including Ningjialong, Bailianzhai, Doumishan, Shuijingtou, Mayuancun, and Tiejishan wells.

Coal lifting: before 1952, hand winches were used for coal lifting. In March 1954, electric winches began to be used to lift coal. In 1983, the main wells of Shuijingtou started to use 4-meter big winches.

Underground transportation: Before 1953, underground transportation was done manually. In 1958, electric motors were used to drive chain scraper conveyors on slider routes, and battery-driven carts were used in 1969.

Ground transportation: In 1955, a large number of trucks were used within the mining area, and in 1960, battery carts began to be used for transportation. Coal was transported externally by Shaoshui shipping before 1957; in 1961, coal began to be transported by train.

Mine ventilation: Natural wind ventilation was utilized in 1952, and steam-driven exhaust fans were installed in 1953. In 1958, electric fans were used in all mine wells and tunnels.

Mine drainage: "Kongming bamboo carts" were used for drainage in 1952, steam reciprocating water pumps were used for drainage from 1953 to 1958, and electric pumps were used for drainage in 1959. At the end of 1988, there were 145 water pumps with a total reserve of 5,336 cubic meters.

Power supply: In addition to the self-provided power plant, power is also supplied from Shaodong substation through transmission lines.

Niumasi Coal Mine covers an area of 23.1 square kilometers, with a coal-bearing area of 13.6 square kilometers and 6 coal seams. In 1990, Niumasi Coal Mine had retained reserves of 21.27 million tons and recoverable reserves of 14.273 million tons. It had 3 pairs of production mine wells, 5,566 employees, and produced 337,400 tons of raw coal. From 1950 to 1990, a total of 10.8047 million tons of raw coal was produced. The total industrial output value of the entire mine was 36.417 million yuan, the family residential area was 65,109.96 square meters, the single employee dormitory area was 33,338.84 square meters, and there were 13 bathhouses and 16 canteens. There were one middle school and one primary school for children of the employees, one staff hospital and 7 medical and health stations.

In early May 1998, Niu Masi Coal Mine applied for the registered trademark "Nuimasi Brand", covering raw coal, washed coal, lump coal, fine lump coal, mixed coal, metallurgical coke, etc. The trademark was approved at the end of the next month.

== Niumasi Mining Co., Ltd. ==
In 2010, Niumasi Coal Mine was acquired and reorganized by Hunan Black Gold Times Co., Ltd (湖南黑金時代股份有限公司), and became a subsidiary of Hunan Coal Industry Group Co., Ltd. (湖南省煤業集團有限公司, short name Hunan Coal Group 湘煤集团). The new name of the coal mine is "Nuimasi Mining Co., Ltd." (牛马司矿业有限公司).

== Honors ==
By the mid-1970s, the annual output of Niumasi Coal Mine reached 750,000 tons, and it ranked among the top 100 enterprises in the national coal system for three consecutive years.

The bituminous coal produced by Niumasi has the advantages of low sulfur, low phosphorus, low ash, and high heat. It won the National Gold Medal in 1982. In 1987, it was reviewed by the National Coal Quality Inspection Center and confirmed that it would continue to maintain the title of National Gold Medal.

== Incidents and Accidents ==
Du Weisong, director of the Engineering Department (mine director) of the local state-owned Shaoyang Niumasi Coal Mine in Hunan Province and Chinese Communist Party Committee Secretary of the Shaoyang Niusmasi Coal Mine, was transferred to this position in June 1951. In January 1954, multiple departments from Hunan Province and Shaoyang City formed a joint investigation team to conduct an investigation. Due to corruption and theft of state property, serious violations of laws and disciplines, Du Weisong was expelled from the party, revoked from all administrative positions, and sentenced to three years in prison.

On November 17, 1953, a gas explosion occurred in the Ningjialong mine well of Niumasi Coal Mine, resulting in 18 deaths, 3 serious injuries, and 2 minor injuries.

On March 10, 2006, a gas explosion occurred in Shuijingtou Coal Mine of Niumasi Company. Nine people were trapped and many of them were killed.

On November 20, 2016, a gas explosion occurred in the Tiejishan Coal Mine of Niumasi Coal Company. Five people were in danger, four of whom died and one was seriously injured.

== Transportation ==
There are Chang-Shao Highway, Heng-Shao Highway, Tan-Shao Expressway and Lou-Shao Railway passing through the mining area. Shaoshui River meanders through the territory.

== Name of "Niumasi" ==
The name "Niumasi" is from the name of a person. "Shaoyang Local Chronicles" records: Liu Mansi (刘满四; 劉滿四) was at Bailing Village, and the place was named after a person.

There is also a legend about Liu Mansi: He was famous in the countryside for his filial piety, which moved Fairy Bailian. The fairy aunt told him: "The hill opposite is full of black gold, which can burn. You only need to dig three feet into the ground to get it." Liu Mansi said, "With such a good thing, I can exchange it for a bucket of rice every day." The fairy aunt said: "Well, you can exchange it for a bucket of rice every day!" (From then on, the hill has been called "Doumi Hill" (Chinese: 斗米山; lit. 'bucket of rice hill') to this day). When the emperor heard about this, he asked for Liu Mansi. When Liu Mansi came to the capital, the emperor asked him: "What is your name?". Liu Mansi replied: "Your Majesty, this humble man is 'Liu Mansi'!" The emperor didn't hear clearly and said, "'Niu Ma Si'" good, the black soil of Niumasi is a treasure!" After receiving the imperial inscription, Liu Mansi was so happy that he named this place "Niumasi" (Chinese: 牛马司; lit. 'cow horse manage').

Another legend goes like this: When the high-quality coal from owner 劉滿四 (Liumansi)'s coal well was exported overseas, the name needed to be transliterated into English. Since the local Hunan people don't distinguish between sounds "n" and "l", they hastily wrote the standard Mandarin pronunciation "Liu Mansi" as "Niu Masi". Later, when the name was translated back into Chinese from foreign languages, it became "牛馬司" (Niu Ma Si). Later, someone discovered this mistake, but since "牛馬司" was easier to use and sounds more interesting than "劉滿四", the mistake has been kept as correct.

== See also ==
- Niumasi Town
- Shaodong
- Shaoyang
