= Zhonglian, Lengshuijiang =

Zhonglian Township 中连乡
- Township
- Location in Hunan
- Coordinates: 27°42′55″N 111°26′56″E
- Country: People's Republic of China
- Province: Hunan
- Prefecture-level city: Loudi
- County-level city: Lengshuijiang

Area
  - Total: 53.03 km^{2} (20.47 sq mi)

Population (2015)
  - Total: 27,500
  - Density: 519/km^{2} (1,340/sq mi)
- Time zone: UTC+8 (China Standard)
- Postal code: 417599
- Area code: 0738

Zhonglian Township (simplified Chinese: 中连乡; traditional Chinese: 中連鄉; pinyin: Zhōnglián Xiāng) is a rural township in Lengshuijiang, Hunan Province, People's Republic of China. As of the 2015 census it had a population of 27,500 and an area of 53.03 square kilometres (20.47 sq mi).

== Administrative divisions ==
The township is divided into 18 villages and 2 communities, which include the following areas:

- Yangjia Community (杨家居委会)
- Zhonglian Community (中连居委会)
- Batang Village (坝塘村)
- Chengyi Village (诚意村)
- Fuyuan Village (福元村)
- Jinping Village (金瓶村)
- Jinwan Village (金湾村)
- Maiyuan Village (麦元村)
- Minzhu Village (民主村)
- Nangong Village (南宫村)
- Qingyun Village (青云村)
- Quanqiu Village (全球村)
- Shengli Village (胜利村)
- Songshan Village (耸山村)
- Tanjia Village (谭家村)
- Yangjia Village (杨家村)
- Yanli Village (岩里村)
- Yuyuan Village (余元村)
- Yuanda Village (远大村)
- Zhonglian Village (中连村)

== Attraction ==
Boyue Cave is a famous scenic spot for karst cave.
