= Longshan National Forest Park =

National park in Yangshi Town, Hunan, China

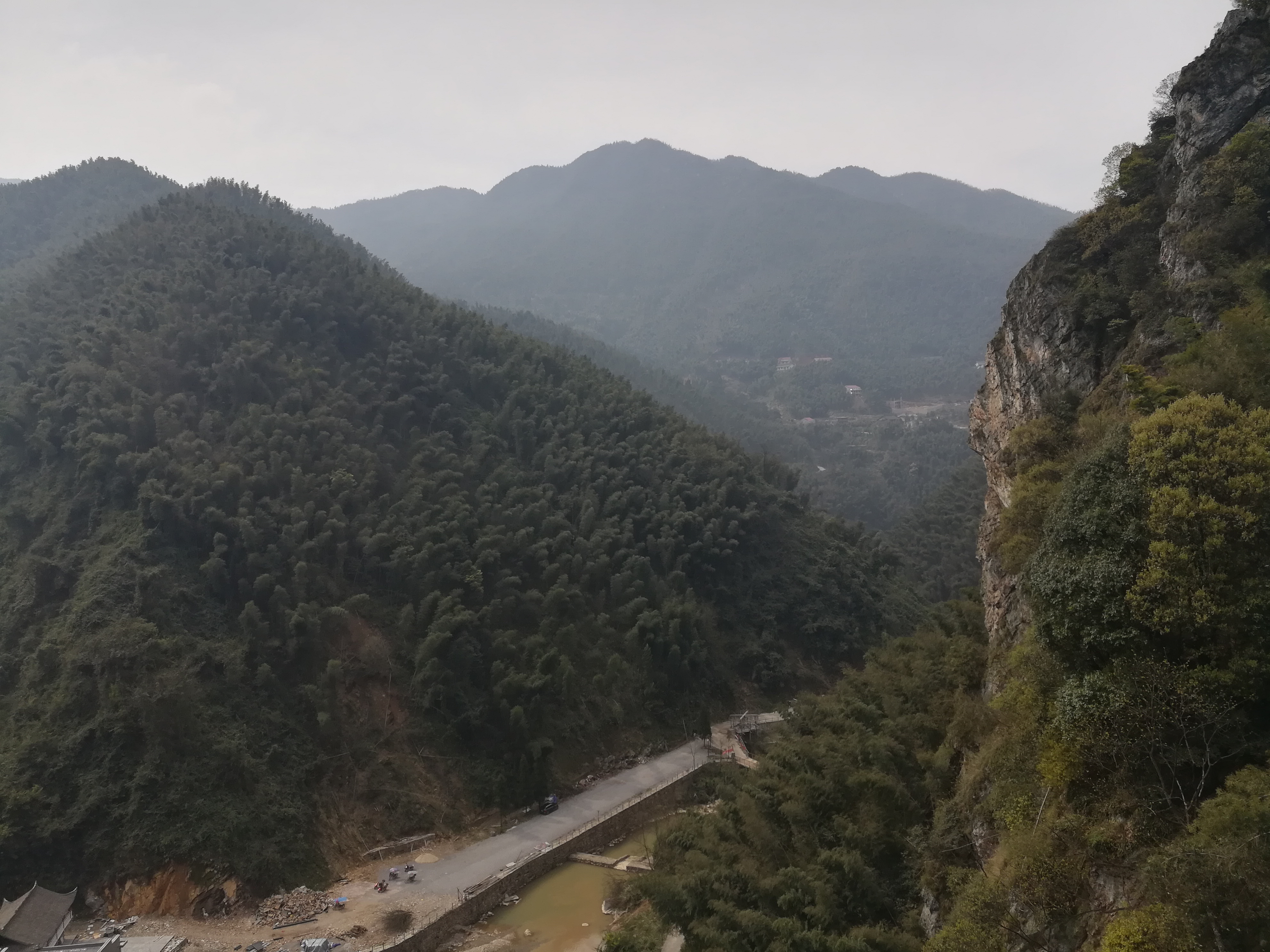
- Longshan National Forest Park.

- Location within Hunan
- Type: National park
- Location: Yangshi Town, Lianyuan, Hunan
- Coordinates: 27°31′24″N 111°49′37″E
- Area: 131.21-square-kilometre (50.66 sq mi)
- Created: 1992
- Operator: Lianyuan Municipal Government
- Open: All year
- Website: lyls.ftourcn.com

Chinese name
- Simplified Chinese: 龙山国家森林公园
- Traditional Chinese: 龍山國家森林公園
- Literal meaning: Dragon Mountains National Forest Park
Transcriptions
Standard Mandarin
- Hanyu Pinyin: Lóngshān Guójiā Sēnlín Gōngyuán

Hunan Baili Longshan Longshan National Forest Park
- Simplified Chinese: 湖南百里龙山国家森林公园
- Traditional Chinese: 湖南百里龍山國家森林公園
Transcriptions
Standard Mandarin
- Hanyu Pinyin: Húnán Bǎilǐ Lóngshān Guójiā Sēnlín Gōngyuán

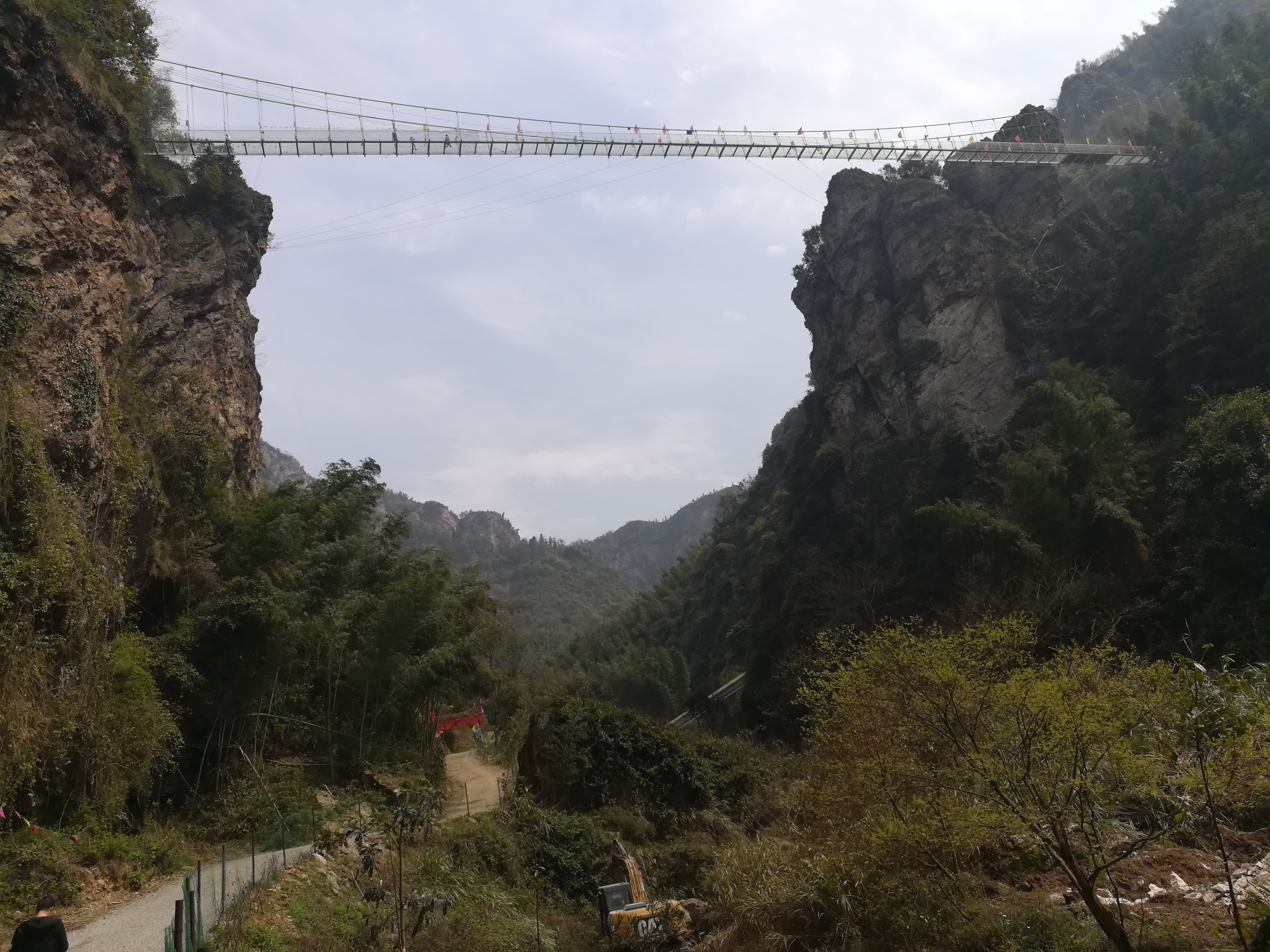
A distant view of the 5D glass bridge in Longshan National Forest Park.

Longshan National Forest Park (Chinese: 龙山国家森林公园; lit. 'Dragon Mountains National Forest Park'), also known as Hunan Baili Longshan Longshan National Forest Park (湖南百里龙山国家森林公园), is a national park in Yangshi Town, Lianyuan, Hunan, China. Located in southern Lianyuan, it is bordered by Hetang Town on the southeast, Maotang Town on the southwest, Fengping Town on the north, and Louxing District of Loudi on the east. It covers an area of 131.21 square kilometres (50.66 sq mi).

== History ==
In 1992 it was designated as a provincial forest park by the Hunan Provincial Forestry Department. In 2006, it was classified as a national forest park by the State Forestry Administration. In 2010, the Longshan area of Xinshao County was merged into the park and its name was changed to "Hunan Baili Longshan Longshan National Forest Park".

== Geography ==
The highest point in the park is Yueping Peak (Chinese: 岳坪峰) which stands 1,513.6 metres (4,966 ft) above sea level.

The Fengshukeng Reservoir (Chinese: 枫树坑水库), with a surface area of 800,000 square metres (8,600,000 sq ft), is available for fishing and boating. In began to construct in 1975 and completed in 1979.

== Fauna and flora ==
Longshan National Forest Park contains an outstanding variety of endemic flora and fauna, of exceptional value to biology. The vegetation in the park is a subtropical evergreen broad-leaved forest with abundant animal and plant resources. There are 164 species of mammals inhabit the park, of them, there are 12 species under class II national protection, such as golden pheasant, Chinese sparrowhawk, and hoplobatrachus tigerinus. It has a forest coverage rate of almost 100%. There are more than 1,672 plant species cultivated in the park of which 54 species have national key protected plants.

== Historical site ==
On the top of the mountains, there is a Taoist temple named "Palace of the King of Medicine" (Chinese: 药王殿). It was built in 1774 during the Qianlong period (1736–1795) of the Qing dynasty (1644–1911).

== Tourist attractions ==
A 5D glass bridge was officially opened to the public on July 10, 2018. Construction started in February 2018 and completed in July 2018. It measures 198.8 metres (652 ft) in total length and 2 metres (6 ft 7 in) in breadth, and is suspended about 118 metres (387 ft) above the ground.

== See also ==
- List of protected areas of China
