= Sanjian, Lengshuijiang =

Sanjian Town 三尖镇
- Town
- Location in Hunan
- Coordinates: 27°32′33″N 111°20′51″E
- Country: People's Republic of China
- Province: Hunan
- Prefecture-level city: Loudi
- County-level city: Lengshuijiang

Area
  - Total: 36.8 km^{2} (14.2 sq mi)

Population
  - Total: 20,000
  - Density: 540/km^{2} (1,400/sq mi)
- Time zone: UTC+8 (China Standard)
- Postal code: 417507
- Area code: 0738

Sanjian Town (simplified Chinese: 三尖镇; traditional Chinese: 三尖鎮; pinyin: Sānjiān Zhèn) is a rural town in Lengshuijiang, Hunan Province, People's Republic of China.

== Administrative divisions ==
The town is divided into 14 villages and 3 communities, which include the following areas: Nanyang Community, Sanjian Community, Shicao Community, Guangming Village, Jintang Village, Jiujiang Village, Lidu Village, Lianyan Village, Liu'er Village, Mushan Village, Shangqing Village, Shenlong Village, Shichuan Village, Xiwan Village, Xinwu Village, Yuyuan Village, and Zhanhe Village (南阳社区、三尖社区、石槽社区、光明村、金塘村、九江村、利渡村、连岩村、六二村、木山村、上青村、神龙村、石船村、西湾村、新屋村、裕沅村、粘禾村).

== Transportation ==
The Provincial Highway S217 is a north-south highway passing through the town.
