= Panqiao, Lengshuijiang =

Panqiao Township
- Township

Chinese transcription(s)
  - Simplified: 潘桥乡
  - Traditional: 潘橋鄉
  - Pinyin: Panqiao Xiang
- Location in China
- Coordinates: 27°38′26″N 111°24′36″E
- Country: People's Republic of China
- Province: Hunan
- City: Loudi
- County-level city: Lengshuijiang

Area
  - Total: 26 km^{2} (10 sq mi)

Population
  - Total: 15,000
  - Density: 580/km^{2} (1,500/sq mi)
- Time zone: UTC+8 (China Standard)
- Area code: 0738

Panqiao Township (simplified Chinese: 潘桥乡; traditional Chinese: 潘橋鄉; pinyin: Panqiao Xiang) was a fomer rural township in Lengshuijiang, Loudi City, Hunan Province, People's Republic of China until 2015.

== Administrative divisions ==
The township is divided into 14 villages and 1 community, which includes the following areas: Guojia Community, Changchong Village, Hongyun Village, Jianxin Village, Jiujing Village, Laowu Village, Maoshan Village, Miaotian Village, Qiaotou Village, Shishan Village, Shuitang Village, Tongzhong Village, Yifang Village, Zhayang Village, and Dongshang Village (郭家社区、长冲村、洪云村、建新村、九井村、老屋村、茂山村、苗田村、桥头村、石山村、税塘村、铜钟村、义芳村、渣洋村、硐上村).
