= Maoyi, Lengshuijiang =

Maoyi Town
- Town

Chinese transcription(s)
  - Simplified: 毛易镇
  - Traditional: 毛易鎮
  - Pinyin: Maoyi Zhen
- Location in China
- Coordinates: 27°39′14″N 111°28′36″E
- Country: People's Republic of China
- Province: Hunan
- City: Loudi
- County-level city: Lengshuijiang

Area
  - Total: 32.6 km^{2} (12.6 sq mi)

Population
  - Total: 30,430
  - Density: 933/km^{2} (2,420/sq mi)
- Time zone: UTC+8 (China Standard)
- Area code: 0738

Maoyi Town (simplified Chinese: 毛易镇; traditional Chinese: 毛易鎮; pinyin: Maoyi Zhen) is an urban town in Lengshuijiang, Loudi City, Hunan Province, People's Republic of China.

== Administrative divisions ==
The town is divided into 8 villages and 2 communities, which include the following areas: Changpu Community, Gangxi Community, Xiaoheng Village, Gangxi Village, Dazhou Village, Huaping Village, Maoyi Village, Qingtang Village, Qingyi Village, and Qunfeng Village (长铺社区、筻溪社区、小横村、筻溪村、大洲村、花坪村、毛易村、清塘村、清一村、群丰村).
