= Shatangwan =

Shatangwan Subdistrict 沙塘湾街道
- Subdistrict
- Location in Hunan
- Coordinates: 27°37′11″N 111°28′16″E
- Country: People's Republic of China
- Province: Hunan
- Prefecture-level city: Loudi
- County-level city: Lengshuijiang

Area
  - Total: 47.57 km^{2} (18.37 sq mi)

Population (2015)
  - Total: 49,000
  - Density: 1,000/km^{2} (2,700/sq mi)
- Time zone: UTC+8 (China Standard)
- Postal code: 417500
- Area code: 0738

Shatangwan Subdistrict (simplified Chinese: 沙塘湾街道; traditional Chinese: 沙塘灣街道; pinyin: Shātángwān Jiēdào) is an urban subdistrict in Lengshuijiang, Hunan Province, People's Republic of China. As of the 2015 census it had a population of 49,000 and an area of 47.57 square kilometres (18.37 sq mi).

== Administrative divisions ==
The subdistrict is divided into 12 villages and 12 communities, which include the following areas:

- Liuxi Community (柳溪社区)
- Lubu Community (炉埠社区)
- Shatangwan Community (沙塘湾社区)
- Wangpingwan Community (王坪湾社区)
- Changpu Community (长铺社区)
- Dongzhan Community (东站社区)
- Community (颜家冲社区)
- Community (枫树坳社区)
- Community (集中社区)
- Community (崇北社区)
- Community (俩塘社区)
- Community (筻溪社区)
- Taiping Village (太坪村)
- Xinmin Village (新民村)
- Changpu Village (长铺村)
- Liuxi Village (柳溪村)
- Huaping Village (花坪村)
- Gangxi Village (筻溪村)
- Xiaoheng Village (小横村)
- Maoyi Village (毛易村)
- Qingyi Village (清一村)
- Qingtang Village (清塘村)
- Dazhou Village (大洲村)
- Qunfeng Village (群丰村)

== Geography ==
Zi River, also known as the mother river, flows through the subdistrict.

== Transportation ==
=== Railway ===
The Shanghai–Kunming railway passes through the middle of the subdistrict.

=== Provincial Highway ===
The Provincial Highway S312, commonly abbreviated as "S312", traveling through the subdistrict.
