= Tongxing, Lengshuijiang =

Tongxing Township
- Township

Chinese transcription(s)
  - Simplified: 同兴乡
  - Traditional: 同興鄉
  - Pinyin: Tongxing Xiang
- Location in China
- Coordinates: 27°41′50″N 111°26′29″E
- Country: People's Republic of China
- Province: Hunan
- City: Loudi
- County-level city: Lengshuijiang

Area
  - Total: 46.5 km^{2} (18.0 sq mi)

Population
  - Total: 10,000
  - Density: 220/km^{2} (560/sq mi)
- Time zone: UTC+8 (China Standard)
- Area code: 0738

Tongxing Township (simplified Chinese: 同兴乡; traditional Chinese: 同興鄉; pinyin: Tongxing Xiang) was a former rural township in Lengshuijiang, Loudi City, Hunan Province, People's Republic of China until 2015.

== Administrative divisions ==
The township is divided into 6 villages and 3 communities, which include the following areas: Chongbei Community, Xinqiao Community, Liatang Community, Baishi Village, Baiyang Village, Tanjia Village, Tongxin Village, Yanli Village, and Yongxing Village (崇北社区、新桥社区、俩塘社区、白石村、白杨村、谭家村、同心村、岩里村、永兴村).
