= Jinzhushan, Lengshuijiang =

Jinzhushan Town 金竹山镇
- Town
- Location in Hunan
- Coordinates: 27°37′24″N 111°28′45″E
- Country: People's Republic of China
- Province: Hunan
- Prefecture-level city: Loudi
- County-level city: Lengshuijiang

Area
  - Total: 26.6 km^{2} (10.3 sq mi)

Population
  - Total: 15,000
  - Density: 560/km^{2} (1,500/sq mi)
- Time zone: UTC+8 (China Standard)
- Postal code: 417505
- Area code: 0738

Jinzhushan Town (simplified Chinese: 金竹山镇; traditional Chinese: 金竹山鎮; pinyin: Jīnzhúshān Zhèn) is a rural town in Lengshuijiang, Loudi City, Hunan Province, People's Republic of China.

== Administrative divisions ==
The town is divided into 12 villages and 6 communities, which include the following areas: Pingtang Community, Jinzhushan Community, Mushan'ao Community, Taizhushan Community, Taizhong Community, Jinshan Community, Dangzheng Village, Dongfeng Village, Heping Village, Hengxing Village, Jinzhu Village, Maxi Village, Taizhong Village, Xintian Village, Yangqiao Village, Yangyuan Village, Zhenxing Village, and Zijiang Village (坪塘社区、金竹山社区、木山坳社区、太主山社区、太中社区、金山社区、当正村、东风村、合坪村、恒星村、金竹村、麻溪村、太中村、新田村、杨桥村、杨源村、振兴村、资江村).

== Geography ==
Zi River, also known as the mother river, winds through the town.

== Transportation ==
=== Railway ===
The Shanghai–Kunming railway, from Shanghai to Kunming, southwest China's Yunnan province, through the town.

=== Provincial Highway ===
The Provincial Highway S312, commonly abbreviated as "S312", passing across the town east to northwest.
