= Hunan Coal Group =

Chinese coal mining enterprise

Hunan Coal Group, or Xiangmei Group (simplified Chinese: 湘煤集团; traditional Chinese: 湘煤集團; pinyin: Xiāngméi Jítuán), full name Hunan Provincial Coal Industry Group (湖南省煤业集团有限公司), is a large energy enterprise in China that has more than 30,000 employees and controls over six billion tons of coal resources. The company consists of 56 subsidiaries operating in Hunan and Xinjiang.

== History ==
Hunan Coal Group was established on June 19, 2006, by integrating the Lianshao Mining Bureau, Zixing Mining Group, Baisha Coal and Electricity Group, Changsha Mining Group, Xiangtan Mining Group, and Chenxi Coal Mine.

In 2009, Hunan Coal Group, China Telecom, and Datang Telecom Group jointly established Hunan Black Gold Times (湖南黑金时代), now called Hunan Coal Industry. It is a key thermal coal producer in Hunan province, and the listed arm of Hunan Coal Group.

In August 2009, roughly five thousand of the company's coal miners began striking after managers of a mine in Jinzhushan, Lengshuijiang, tried forcing them to sign contracts that would make their severance pay disconnected from their length of service, which violated China's 2008 Labour Contract Law.

From 2018 to 2020, the group reported over ten billion yuan in revenue, paying approximately one billion yuan in taxes and profiting between 250 and 280 million yuan. In 2023, the company's revenue reached 18.107 billion yuan, resulting in 1.703 billion yuan paid in taxes, and a profit of 802 million yuan. That year, Hunan Coal Group was ranked 40th place among the "Top 50 Chinese Coal Enterprises".

In May 2018, the Intermediate People's Court in Yueyang, Hunan, sentenced Tan Daoxiong, Chairman of the Hunan Coal Group and Hunan Black Goal Times, to nine years in prison and a 600,000 RMB fine on bribery, corruption, and abuse of power charges. Using his Chinese Communist Party and corporate positions to solicit bribes, Tan had accepted property and money worth more than two million yuan.
