= Kuangshan, Lengshuijiang =

Kuangshan Township
- Township

Chinese transcription(s)
  - Simplified: 矿山乡
  - Traditional: 礦山鄉
  - Pinyin: Kuàngshān Xiāng
- Location in China
- Coordinates: 27°46′59″N 111°29′50″E
- Country: People's Republic of China
- Province: Hunan
- City: Loudi
- County-level city: Lengshuijiang

Area
  - Total: 59 km^{2} (23 sq mi)

Population
  - Total: 16,000
  - Density: 270/km^{2} (700/sq mi)
- Time zone: UTC+8 (China Standard)
- Area code: 0738

Kuangshan Township (simplified Chinese: 矿山乡; traditional Chinese: 礦山鄉; pinyin: Kuàngshān Xiāng) was a fomer rural township in Lengshuijiang, Loudi City, Hunan Province, People's Republic of China until 2015.

== Administrative divisions ==
The township is divided into 15 villages and 1 community, which include the following areas: Tanjia Community, Baiyun Village, Chuanshan Village, Dongxia Village, Fanjia Village, Gaofeng Village, Guanjia Village, Hexing Village, Hengyuan Village, Laifeng Village, Longhushan Village, Majing Village, Shuituo Village, Xinsheng Village, Zhangmu Village, and Zhushan Village (谭家社区、白云村、船山村、洞下村、樊家村、高峰村、官家村、合兴村、恒元村、来风村、龙虎山村、马井村、水托村、新生村、樟木村、竹山村).
