= Xinhua railway station =

Railway station in Hunan, China

Coordinates: 27.7312°N 111.2979°E

Xinhua railway station is a fourth-class railway station on the Shanghai–Kunming railway. It was built in 1970 and is under the jurisdiction of China Railway Guangzhou Group.

Preceding station	China Railway	Following station
Lengshuijiang East towards Shanghai or Shanghai South	Shanghai–Kunming railway	Anhua towards Kunming
