= Yankou, Lengshuijiang =

Yankou Town
- Town

Chinese transcription(s)
  - Simplified: 岩口镇
  - Traditional: 巖口鎮
  - Pinyin: Yankou Zhen
- Location in China
- Coordinates: 27°38′53″N 111°32′57″E
- Country: People's Republic of China
- Province: Hunan
- City: Loudi
- County-level city: Lengshuijiang

Area
  - Total: 24 km^{2} (9.3 sq mi)

Population
  - Total: 22,000
  - Density: 920/km^{2} (2,400/sq mi)
- Time zone: UTC+8 (China Standard)
- Area code: 0738

Yankou Town (simplified Chinese: 岩口镇; traditional Chinese: 巖口鎮; pinyin: Yankou Zhen) is an urban town in Lengshuijiang, Loudi City, Hunan Province, People's Republic of China.

== Administrative divisions ==
The town is divided into 14 villages and 3 communities, which include the following areas: Hongyan Community, Tangshi Community, Yankou Community, Dachong Village, Guanghua Village, Guanxi Village, Hong'an Village, Huaihua Village, Jinlian Village, Jinxing Village, Nongke Village, Quanping Village, Shikeng Village, Tangchong Village, Tangwan Village, Yankou Village, and Yuanling Village (红岩社区、塘石社区、岩口社区、大冲村、光华村、官溪村、红安村、槐花村、金连村、金星村、农科村、泉坪村、石坑村、塘冲村、塘湾村、岩口村、元岭村).
