= Buxi, Lengshuijiang =

Buxi Subdistrict 布溪街道
- Subdistrict
- Location in Hunan
- Coordinates: 27°40′49″N 111°25′29″E
- Country: People's Republic of China
- Province: Hunan
- Prefecture-level city: Loudi
- County-level city: Lengshuijiang

Area
  - Total: 12.24 km^{2} (4.73 sq mi)

Population (2015)
  - Total: 20,000
  - Density: 1,600/km^{2} (4,200/sq mi)
- Time zone: UTC+8 (China Standard)
- Postal code: 417500
- Area code: 0738

Buxi Subdistrict (Chinese: 布溪街道; pinyin: Bùxī Jiēdào) is an urban subdistrict in Lengshuijiang, Loudi City, Hunan Province, People's Republic of China. As of the 2015 census it had a population of 20,000 and an area of 12.24 square kilometres (4.73 sq mi).

== Administrative divisions ==
The subdistrict is divided into 5 communities and 4 villages, which include the following areas:

- Buxi Community (布溪居委会)
- Qingyuan Community (青园居委会)
- Shicha Community (施茶居委会)
- Zi River Community (资江居委会)
- Guojia Community (郭家居委会)
- Yifang Village (义方村)
- Zhayang Village (渣洋村)
- Laowu Village (老屋村)
- Jiujing Village (九井村)
