= Yangshi, Lianyuan =

Yangshi Town 杨市镇
- Town
- Location in Hunan
- Coordinates: 27°37′41″N 111°48′58″E
- Country: People's Republic of China
- Province: Hunan
- Prefecture-level city: Loudi
- County-level city: Lianyuan

Area
  - Total: 131.7 km^{2} (50.8 sq mi)

Population
  - Total: 84,000
  - Density: 640/km^{2} (1,700/sq mi)
- Time zone: UTC+8 (China Standard)
- Postal code: 417100
- Area code: 0738

Yangshi Town (simplified Chinese: 杨市镇; traditional Chinese: 楊市鎮; pinyin: Yángshì Zhèn) is an urban town in and subdivision of Lianyuan, Hunan Province, People's Republic of China.

== Administrative divisions ==
The town is divided into 55 villages and 7 communities:

- Saili Community
- Quanxi Community
- Yongfutuan Community
- Xianghuolu Community
- Lixin Community
- Sunshuihe Community
- Jixiang Community
- Yonghe Village
- Meishan'ao Village
- Tuanshan Village
- Xinjian Village
- Huishui Village
- Meilin Village
- Qijia Village
- Renrang Village
- Jinpen Village
- Huping Village
- Wutong Village
- Yongjia Village
- Wuyi Village
- Shanlong Village
- Longdang Village
- Manjia Village
- Jinxing Village
- Shijia Village
- Shansong Village
- Xianbu Village
- Shuangjiangkou Village
- Pijia Village
- Tongzishan Village
- Huazhong Village
- Xiangsi Village
- Longfu Village
- Taihe Village
- Guanzhuang Village
- Banqiao Village
- Doushan Village
- Longtan Village
- Nanchong Village
- Quanhe Village
- Mixi Village
- Chetianlong Village
- Changxiping Village
- Kuaixi Village
- Qianji Village
- Rongfeng Village
- Zhuangwan Village
- Meishui Village
- Baishui Village
- Lianmeng Village
- Da'ao Village
- Shanshu Village
- Longxi Village
- Gaoting Village
- Gaoshan Village
- Laoqiao Village
- Chating Village
- Chaofu Village
- Diji Village
- Dongyuan Village
- Dongping Village
- Xiaojiang Village
