= Zilong, Lengshuijiang =

Zilong Township
- Township

Chinese transcription(s)
  - Simplified: 梓龙乡
  - Traditional: 梓龍鄉
  - Pinyin: Zilong Xiang
- Location in China
- Coordinates: 27°41′26″N 111°31′53″E
- Country: People's Republic of China
- Province: Hunan
- City: Loudi
- County-level city: Lengshuijiang

Area
  - Total: 31.68 km^{2} (12.23 sq mi)

Population
  - Total: 10,000
  - Density: 320/km^{2} (820/sq mi)
- Time zone: UTC+8 (China Standard)
- Area code: 0738

Zilong Township (simplified Chinese: 梓龙乡; traditional Chinese: 梓龍鄉; pinyin: Zilong Xiang) is a rural township in Lengshuijiang, Loudi City, Hunan Province, People's Republic of China.

== Administrative divisions ==
The township is divided into eight villages, which include the following areas: Dishui Village, Linchang Village, Qianjin Village, Wujia Village, Yangqiao Village, Yangxin Village, Zhoutou Village, and Ziping Village (滴水村、林场村、前进村、吴家村、杨桥村、杨新村、周头村、梓坪村).
