= Lengshuijiang =

Lengshuijiang 冷水江市
- County-level city
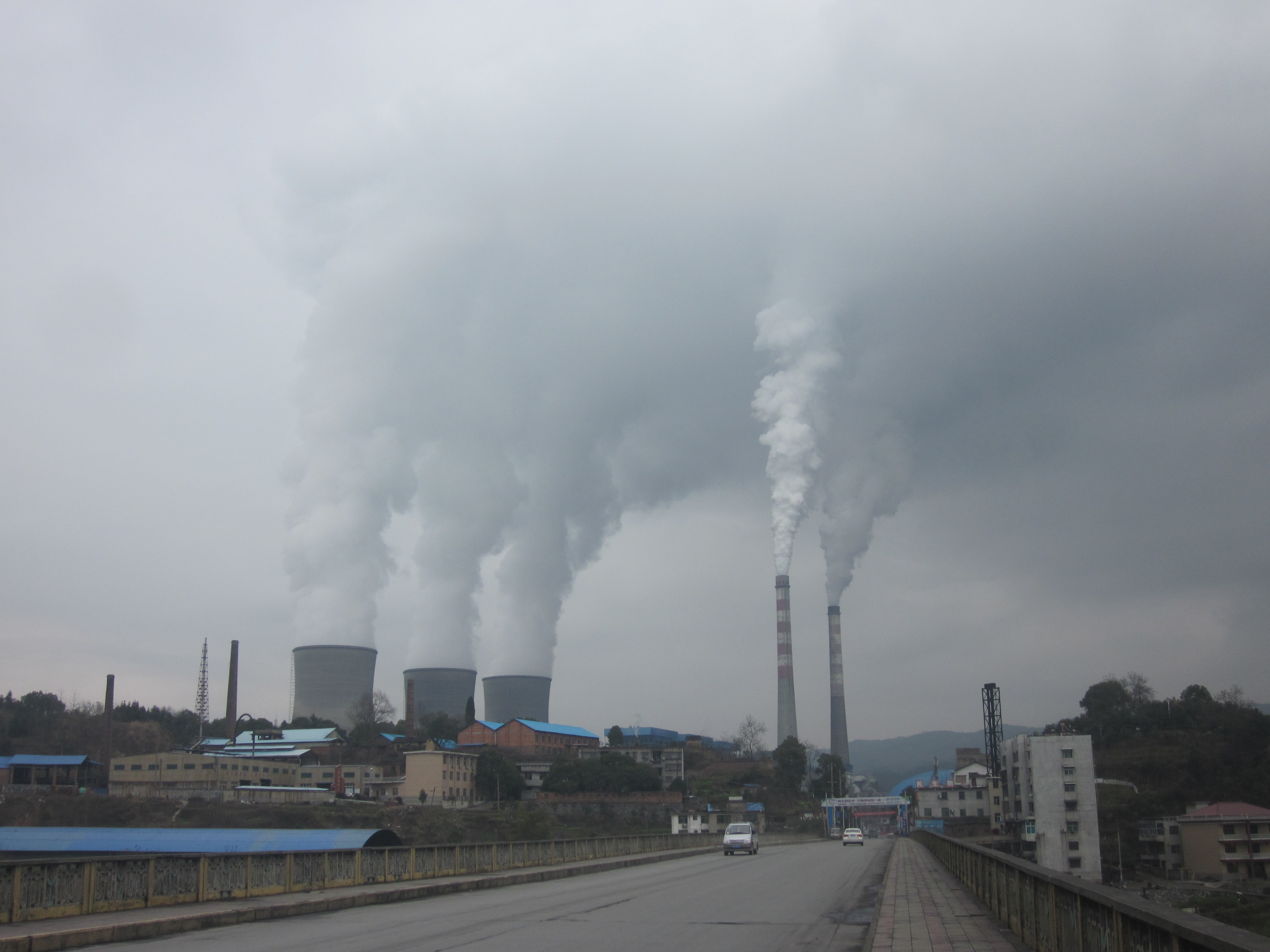

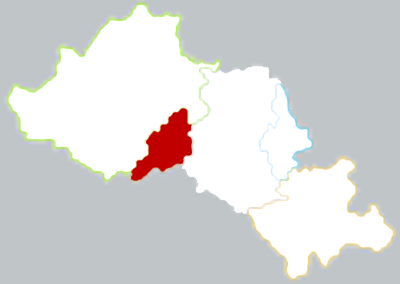
- Location of Lengshuijiang City within Loudi

- Location in Hunan
- Coordinates: 27°41′10″N 111°26′10″E
- Country: People's Republic of China
- Province: Hunan
- Prefecture-level city: Loudi

Area
  - County-level city: 436.28 km^{2} (168.45 sq mi)
  - Urban: 48.81 km^{2} (18.85 sq mi)

Population (2010)
  - County-level city: 327,279
  - Estimate (2017): 407,000
  - Density: 750.16/km^{2} (1,942.9/sq mi)
  - Urban: 198,299
- Time zone: UTC+8 (China Standard)
- Postal code: 4175XX

Lengshuijiang (Chinese: 冷水江; pinyin: Lěngshuǐjiāng) is a county-level city in Hunan Province, China, under the administration of Loudi prefecture-level city. Located in central Hunan, the city is bordered to the north and west by Xinhua County, to the south by Xinshao County, and to the east by Lianyuan City. Lengshuijiang City covers 439 km^{2} (169 sq mi). As of 2015, it has a registered population of 370,300 and a resident population of 342,700. The city has four subdistricts, five towns and a township under its jurisdiction. The government seat is Lengshuijiang Subdistrict (冷水江街道).

Lengshuijiang was incorporated as a city in 1960 and was created from parts of Xinhua County. It is a resource-based city with the world's largest antimony mine, which produces more than 50% of the world's antimony.

== Subdivision ==
According to the result on adjustment of township-level administrative divisions of Lengshuijiang on November 23, 2015, the divisions of Lengshuijiang, according to the result on adjustment of township-level administrative divisions of Lengshuijiang on November 23, 2015: Kuangshan Township was merged into Xikuangshan Subdistrict, Yankou Town was merged into Duoshan Town, Zilong Township was merged into Zhadu Town, Panqiao Township, Tongxing Township and Maoyi Town were revoked.

English name	Chinese name	Population (2015)	Area (2015)	Notes
Buxi Subdistrict	布溪街道	20,000	12.24 km^{2} (4.73 sq mi)	
Lengshuijiang Subdistrict	冷水江街道	81,200	15.9 km^{2} (6.1 sq mi)	
Shatangwan Subdistrict	沙塘湾街道	49,000	47.57 km^{2} (18.37 sq mi)	
Xikuangshan Subdistrict	锡矿山街道	30,500	67.05 km^{2} (25.89 sq mi)	
Duoshan Town	铎山镇	47,300	52.29 km^{2} (20.19 sq mi)	
Heqing Town	禾青镇	36,800	44.44 km^{2} (17.16 sq mi)	
Jinzhushan Town	金竹山镇	15,000	26.6 km^{2} (10.3 sq mi)	
Sanjian Town	三尖镇	20,000	36.8 km^{2} (14.2 sq mi)	
Zhadu Town	渣渡镇	32,000	74.97 km^{2} (28.95 sq mi)	
Zhonglian Township	中连乡	27,500	53.03 km^{2} (20.47 sq mi)	

== Geography ==
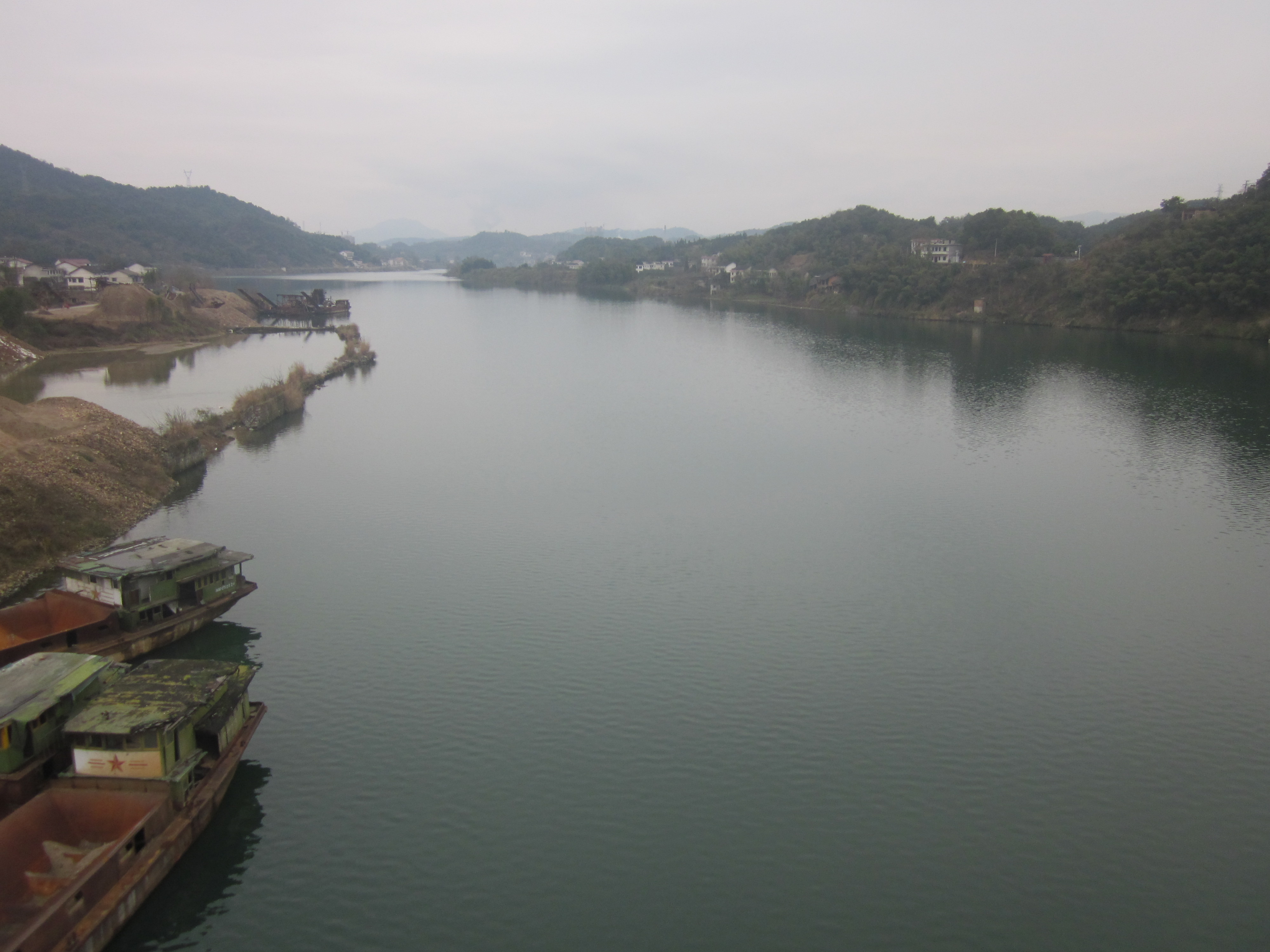
Picture of Zi River in Lengshuijiang, Hunan.

Lengshuijiang is located in the middle of Hunan province, on foothills of the Xuefeng Mountains and along the Zi River. The city is bordered to the north by Anhua County, to the east by Lianyuan, to the south by Xinshao, and to the west and northwest by Xinhua. The city has a total area of 439 square kilometres (169 sq mi).

=== Rivers ===
Zi River, is a tributary of Xiang River, flows through the city, draining an area of 326.5 square kilometres (126.1 sq mi).

=== Reservoirs ===
Zhoutou Reservoir (周头水库) is a reservoir and the largest body of water in the city.

=== Mountains ===
There are 123 mountains in the city over 400 metres (1,300 ft) above sea level, and 20 of them are more than 800 metres (2,600 ft). The highest natural elevation in Lengshuijiang is 1,073 metres (3,520 ft) at Zushiling Ridge (祖师岭).

== Climate ==
Lengshuijiang is in the subtropical monsoon climate zone, with an average annual temperature of 16.7 °C (62.1 °F), total annual rainfall of 1,354-millimetre (53.3 in), a frost-free period of 269 days and annual average sunshine hours in 1401.8 hours. It exhibits four distinct seasons.

Climate data for Lengshuijiang, elevation 249 m (817 ft), (1991–2020 normals, extremes 1981–2010)
Month	Jan	Feb	Mar	Apr	May	Jun	Jul	Aug	Sep	Oct	Nov	Dec	Year
Record high °C (°F)	25.9 (78.6)	30.2 (86.4)	35.0 (95.0)	35.7 (96.3)	36.5 (97.7)	37.2 (99.0)	39.5 (103.1)	40.0 (104.0)	38.4 (101.1)	35.4 (95.7)	31.5 (88.7)	24.3 (75.7)	40.0 (104.0)
Mean daily maximum °C (°F)	8.9 (48.0)	11.6 (52.9)	16.0 (60.8)	22.4 (72.3)	26.8 (80.2)	29.7 (85.5)	33.0 (91.4)	32.4 (90.3)	28.5 (83.3)	23.1 (73.6)	17.8 (64.0)	11.8 (53.2)	21.8 (71.3)
Daily mean °C (°F)	5.3 (41.5)	7.6 (45.7)	11.6 (52.9)	17.4 (63.3)	21.8 (71.2)	25.2 (77.4)	28.1 (82.6)	27.2 (81.0)	23.3 (73.9)	18.1 (64.6)	12.9 (55.2)	7.5 (45.5)	17.2 (62.9)
Mean daily minimum °C (°F)	2.6 (36.7)	4.7 (40.5)	8.4 (47.1)	13.7 (56.7)	18.0 (64.4)	21.8 (71.2)	24.2 (75.6)	23.6 (74.5)	19.8 (67.6)	14.6 (58.3)	9.3 (48.7)	4.2 (39.6)	13.7 (56.7)
Record low °C (°F)	−6.3 (20.7)	−4.7 (23.5)	−1.6 (29.1)	2.1 (35.8)	7.5 (45.5)	12.2 (54.0)	17.1 (62.8)	16.5 (61.7)	12.0 (53.6)	2.9 (37.2)	−1.8 (28.8)	−8.2 (17.2)	−8.2 (17.2)
Average precipitation mm (inches)	69.1 (2.72)	75.1 (2.96)	131.1 (5.16)	164.2 (6.46)	204.1 (8.04)	260.6 (10.26)	175.5 (6.91)	136.3 (5.37)	79.1 (3.11)	76.5 (3.01)	72.1 (2.84)	51.0 (2.01)	1,494.7 (58.85)
Average precipitation days (≥ 0.1 mm)	13.8	13.9	17.8	17.2	15.9	17.0	11.6	13.0	9.6	10.1	10.4	11.2	161.5
Average snowy days	5.7	3.4	0.7	0	0	0	0	0	0	0	0.3	2.2	12.3
Average relative humidity (%)	77	77	79	78	79	82	76	78	78	76	75	73	77
Mean monthly sunshine hours	58.8	58.1	77.6	101.6	124.7	119.4	196.0	175.9	130.1	113.5	104.3	86.8	1,346.8
Percentage possible sunshine	18	18	21	26	30	29	46	44	36	32	33	27	30
Source: China Meteorological Administration

== Economy ==
As of 2016, Lengshuijiang's GDP is CN¥ 28,880,000,000. The city's economy is dominated by coal resource, which is venerated as "Coal Sea in Jiangnan".

It is well known for its rich mineral resources and has developed into a regional antimony production centre. Lengshuijiang City has the largest antimony reserves in China, and the Lengshuijiang Mining Bureau plays a key role in local industrial activity. The non-ferrous metals industry has historically driven the region's economic growth, with mining and smelting facilities forming the backbone of the city's industrial base. In recent years, the local government has also promoted industrial upgrading and ecological protection to ensure sustainable development.

== Demographics ==
=== Population ===
As of 2016, the National Bureau of Statistics of the People's Republic of China estimates the city's population to be 372,400. Lengshuijiang has a majority Han population with Miao, Hui and Tujia ethnic minorities.

=== Language ===
Mandarin is the official language. The local people speak Loudi dialect.

=== Religion ===
The city hosts religious institutions of various faiths, including Christianity, Islam, Chinese folk religion, Buddhism, and Taoism.

== Education ==
As of 2016, Lengshuijiang has two high schools, 11 middle schools, 57 primary schools and 78 kindergartens.

Lengshuijiang Normal School is an institution of higher education in Lengshuijiang, which has no university.

== Transportation ==
=== Railway ===
The Shanghai–Kunming railway passes through the middle of the city.

The Shanghai–Kunming high-speed railway also passes through the southwestern portion of the city.

=== Expressway ===
The S70 Loudi–Huaihua Expressway, more commonly known as "Louhuai Expressway", is a west–east highway passing through the southwestern portion of the city.

=== Provincial Highway ===
The Provincial Highway S312 runs east to west through the city.

The Provincial Highway S217 is a north–south highway passing through the town of Sanjian.

== Tourism ==
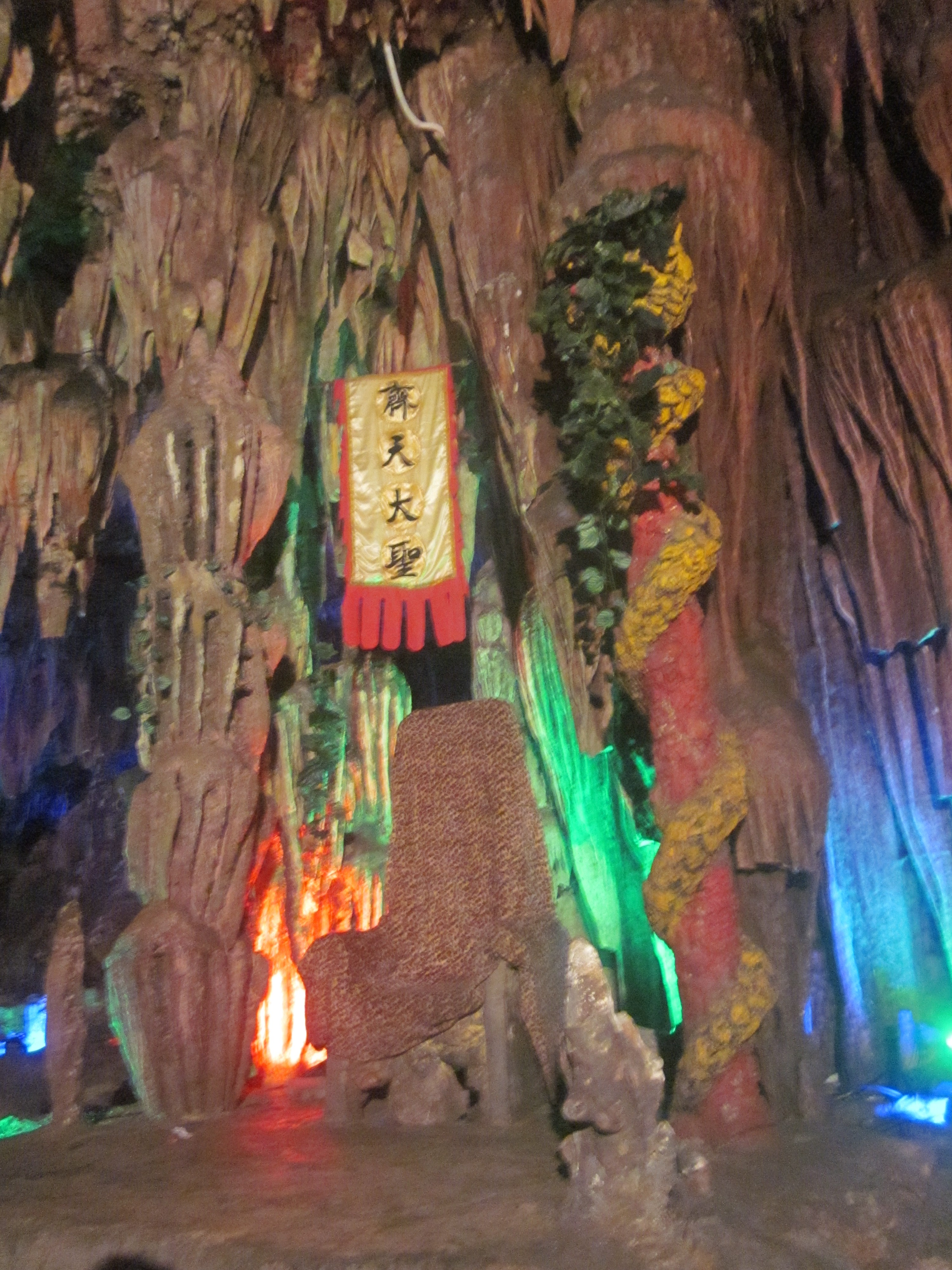
Seat of the Monkey King in Boyue Cave.

Boyue Cave is situated in Zhonglian Township. It is the most well-known tourist spot in the city. The spot was used for location filming of the 1986 fantasy television series Journey to the West.

Dachengshan Scenic Spot (大乘山风景名胜区) is a provincial-level scenic spot in southeastern Lengshuijiang.

Zhoutouhu Holiday Resort (周头湖度假区) is a popular attraction in the city for recreation for residents.

== Notable people ==
- Duan Chuxian (段楚贤; 1889–1954), entrepreneur.
- Jiang Yunqing (姜云清; 1914–2000), a notable soldier in the Red Army.
- Su Jing (苏镜; 1912–1989), politician.
- Su Peng (苏鹏; 1880–1853), revolutionist.
- Xie Bingying (谢冰莹; 1906–2000), writer.
- Xie Dingzhong (谢定中; born 1938), chemist.
- Zeng Jie (曾杰; 1886–1941), mathematician.
- Zhu Jiang (朱江; 1916–1988), an official in the People's Liberation Army.
