= Boyue Cave =

Cave in China

- 波月洞 (Chinese)
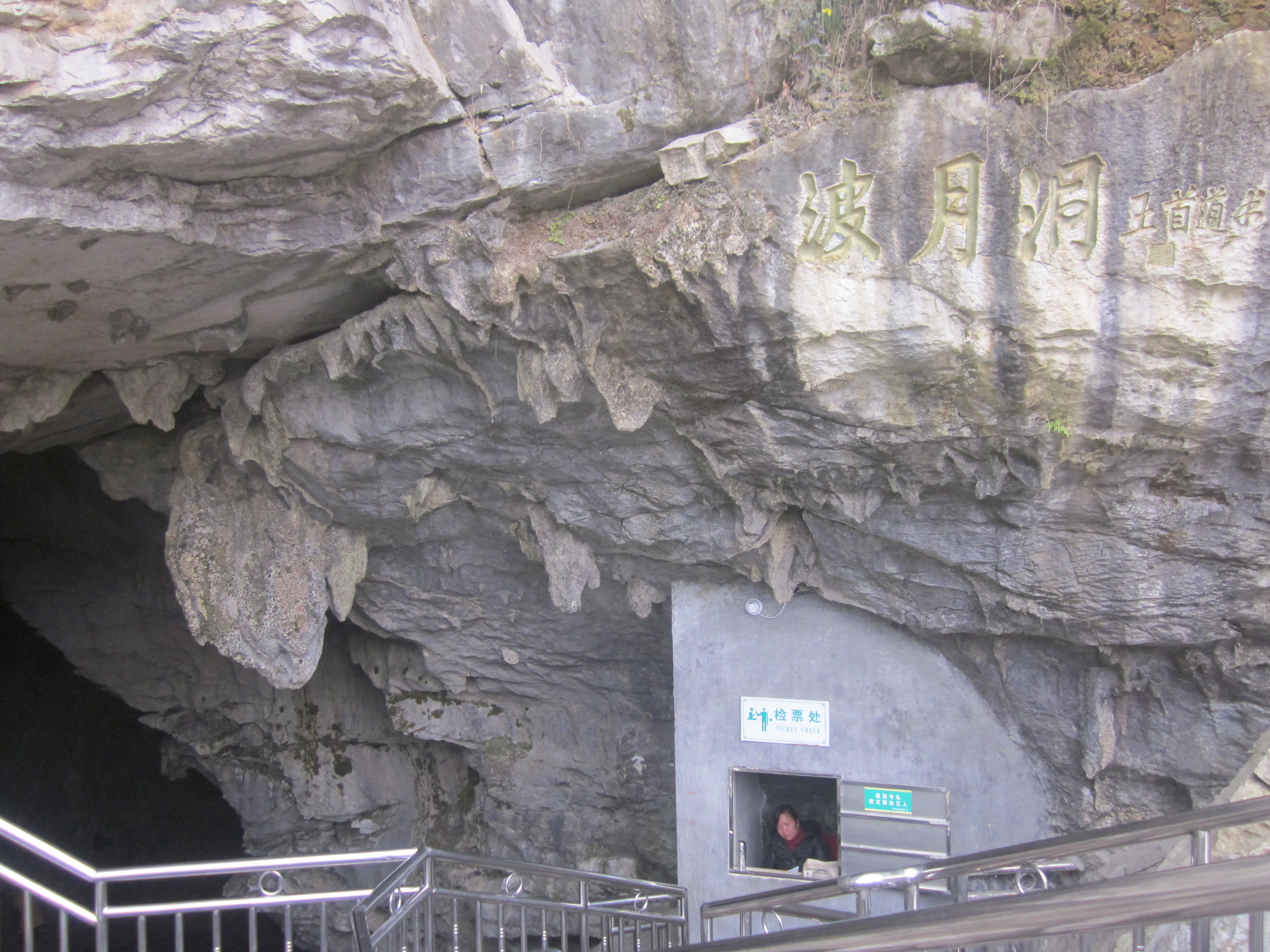
- Entrance of Boyue Cave.

- location in China
- 27°42′35″N 111°27′54″E
- Location: Lengshuijiang, Hunan, China

Boyue Cave (Chinese: 波月洞) is a karstic cave in Lengshuijiang, Hunan, China. Located at the foot of Mount dacheng (大乘山), it was one of the locations of 1986 shenmo television series Journey to the West. It is now a popular destination for cavers, walkers, and outdoor activity groups.

== History ==
In the 1980s, Boyue Cave served as a shooting location for the 1986 shenmo television series Journey to the West. The fight scenes in the Cavern of White Bone Demon (白骨洞) were filmed in Boyue Cave, and the Seat of the Monkey King in Water Curtain Cave (水帘洞) was shot in there.

== Gallery ==
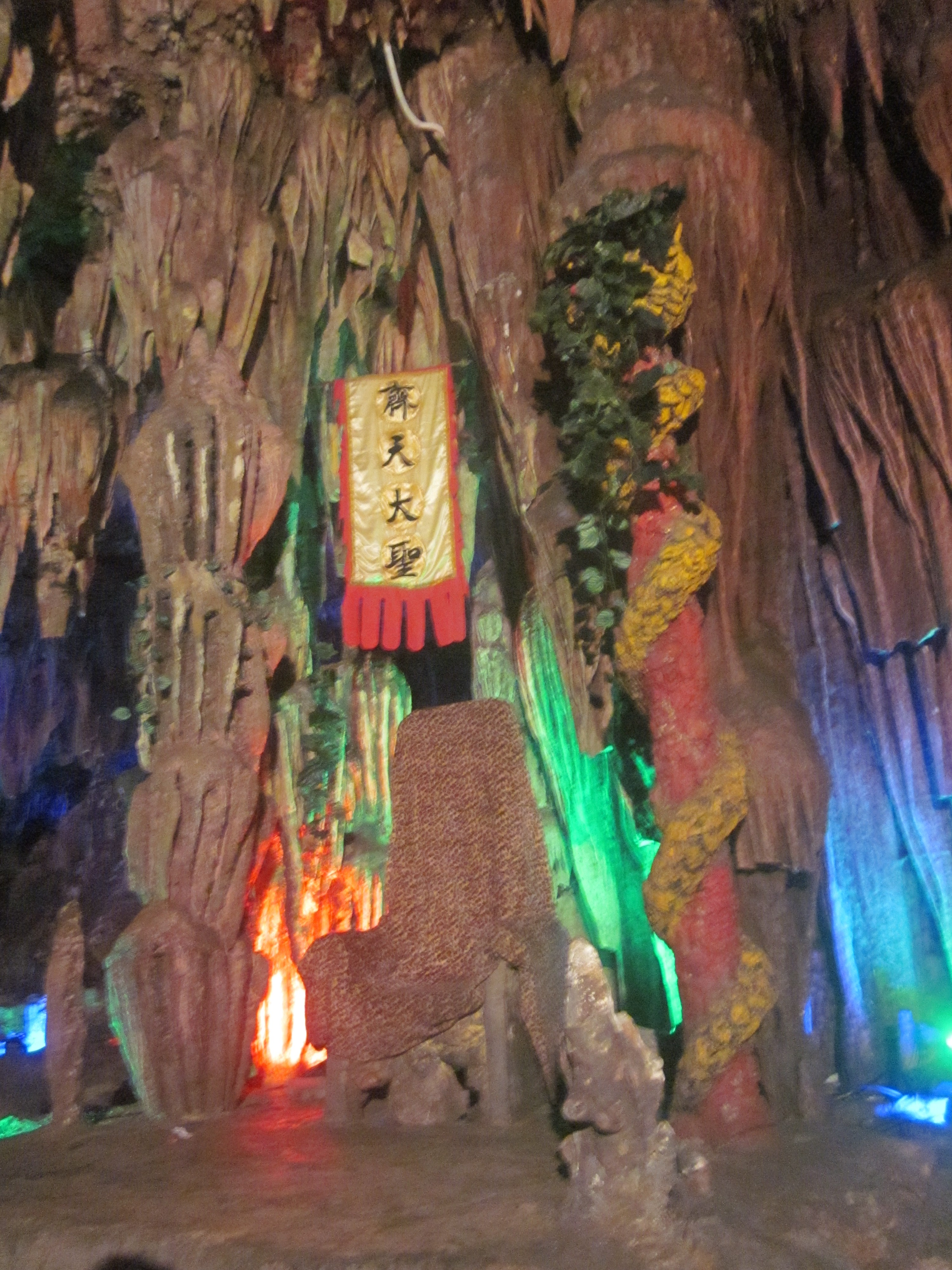
Seat of the Monkey King, Boyue Cave.

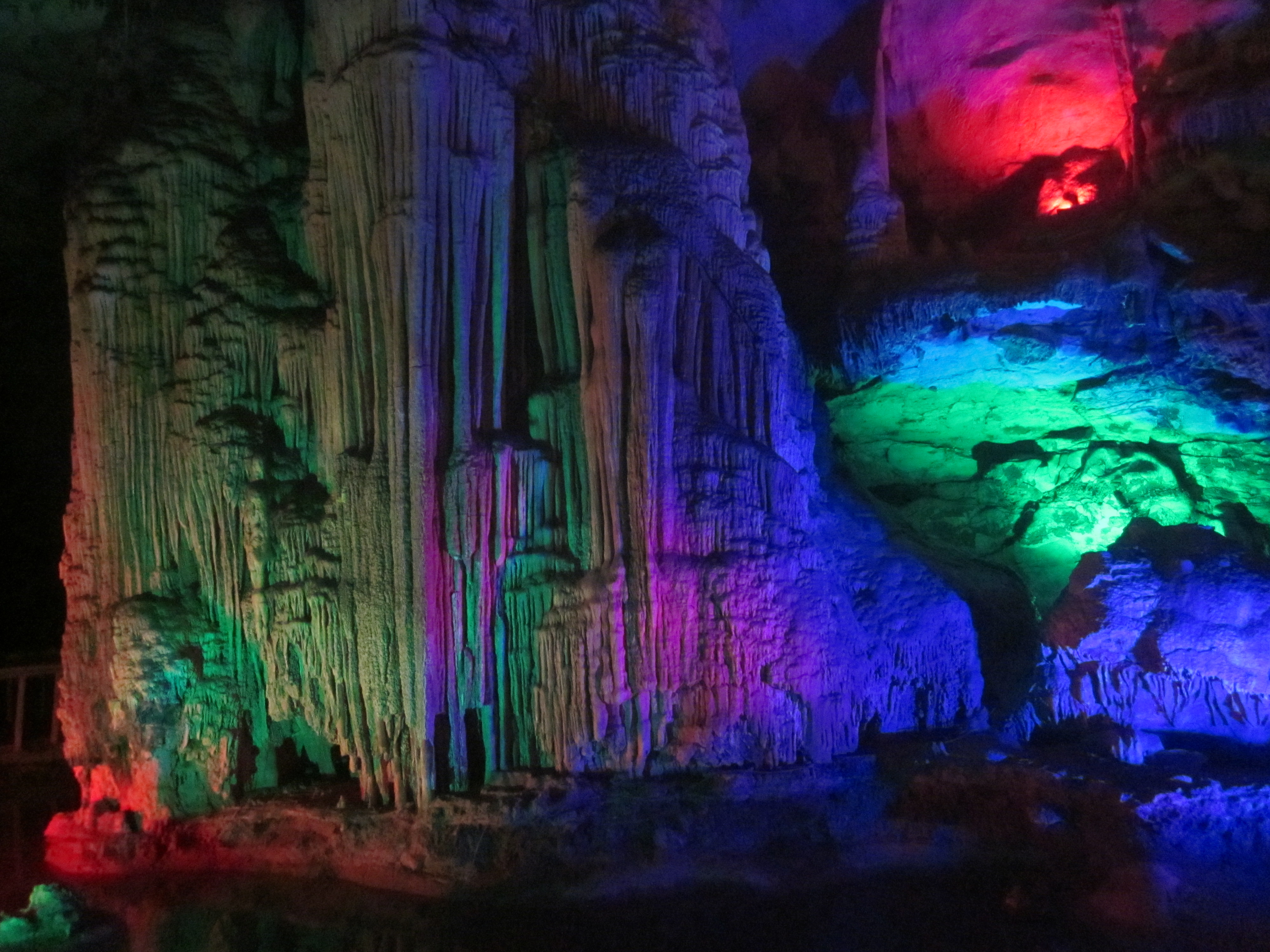
Stalactite, Boyue Cave.

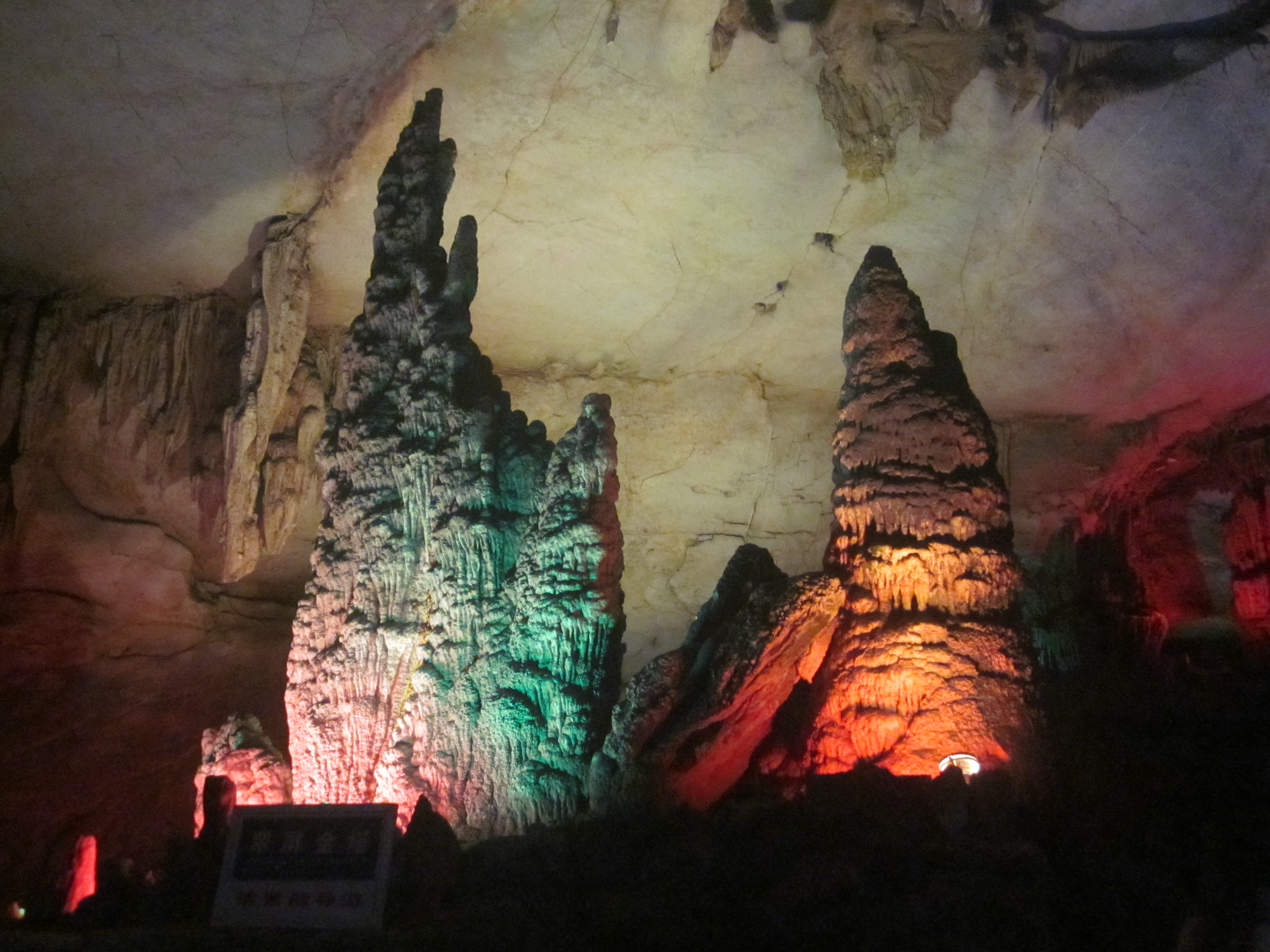
Stalactites, Boyue Cave.

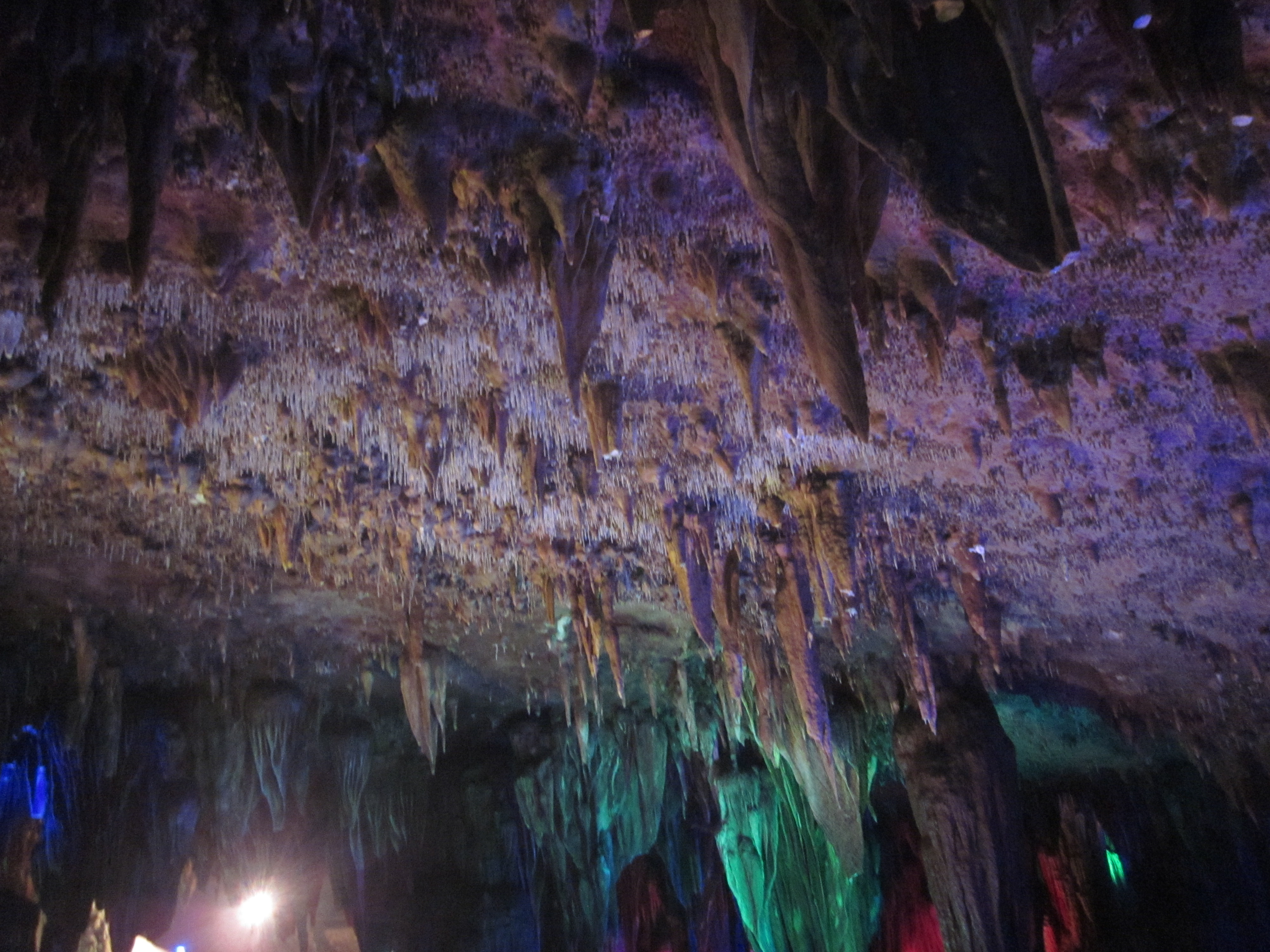
Stalactites, Boyue Cave.

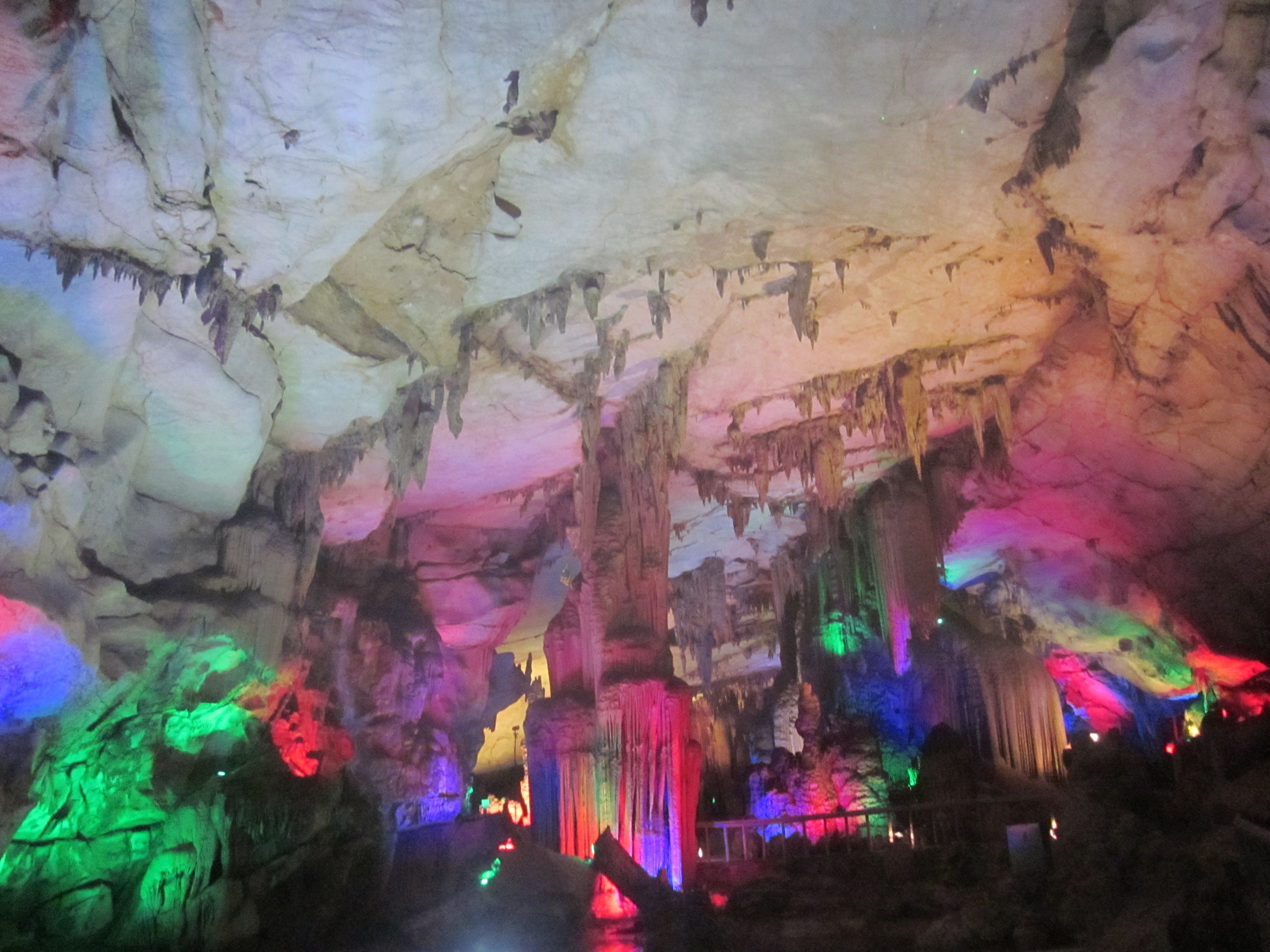
Stalactites, Boyue Cave.

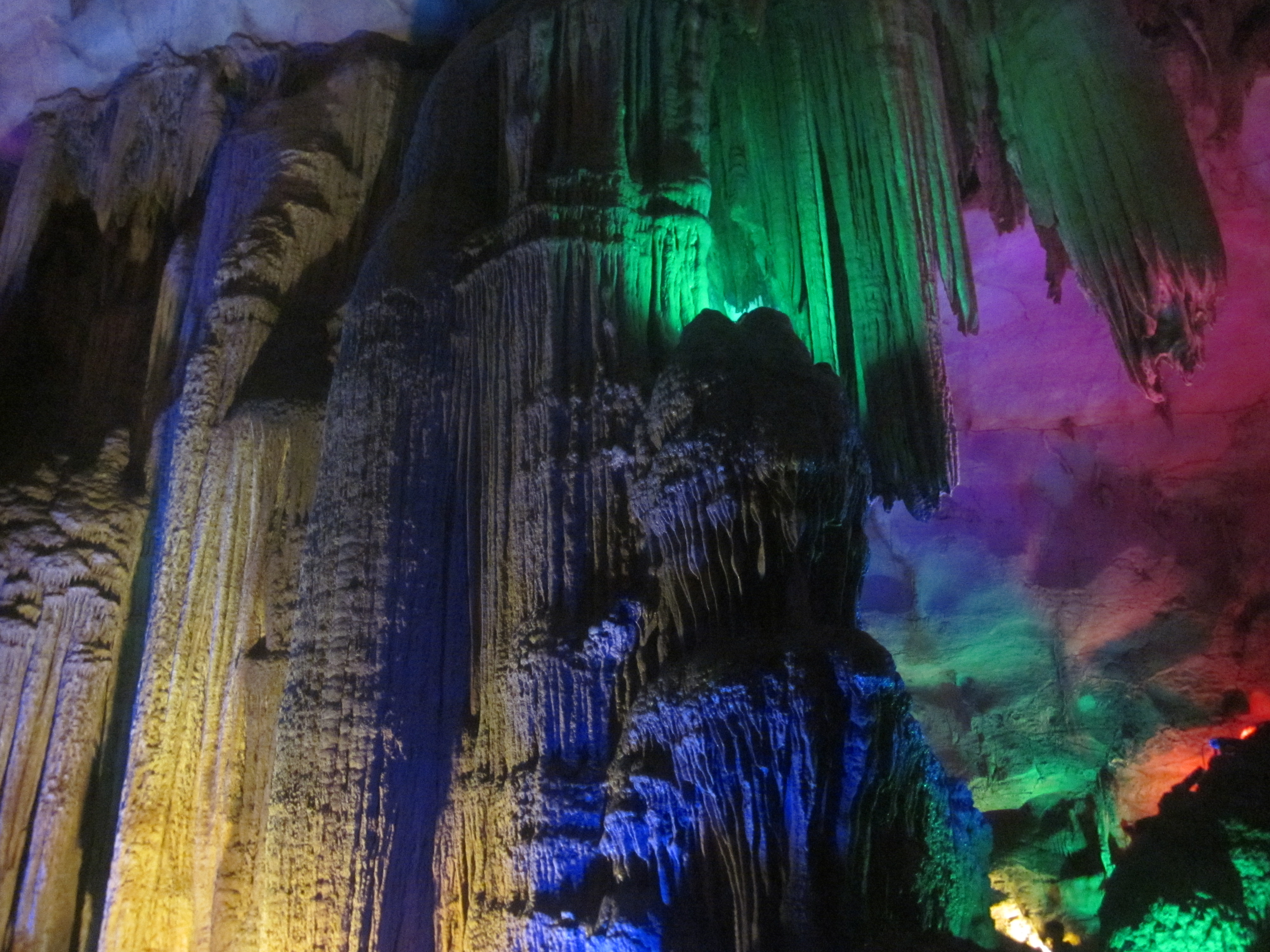
Stalactites, Boyue Cave.
