= Zi River =

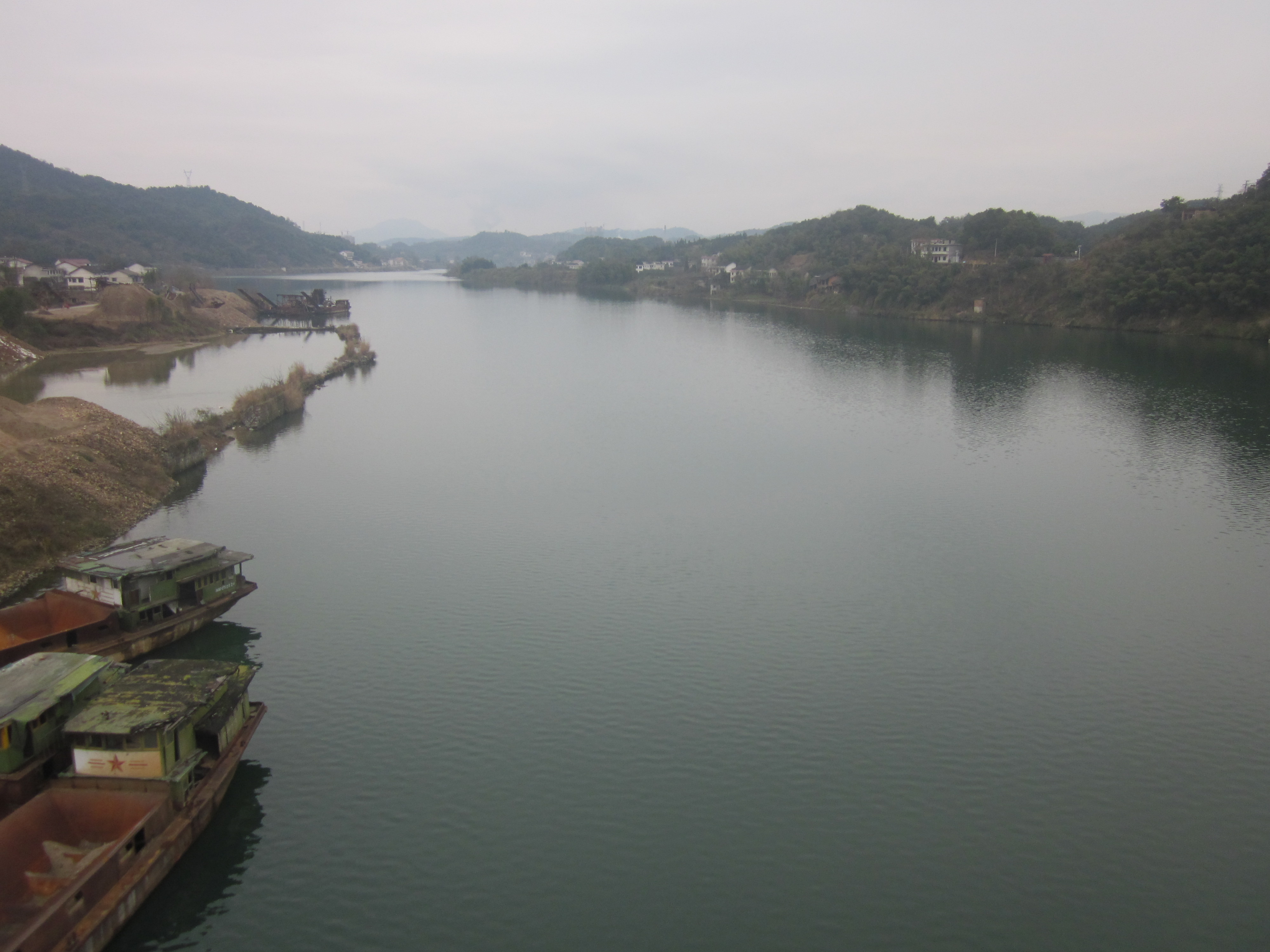
- Picture of Zi River in Lengshuijiang, Hunan.

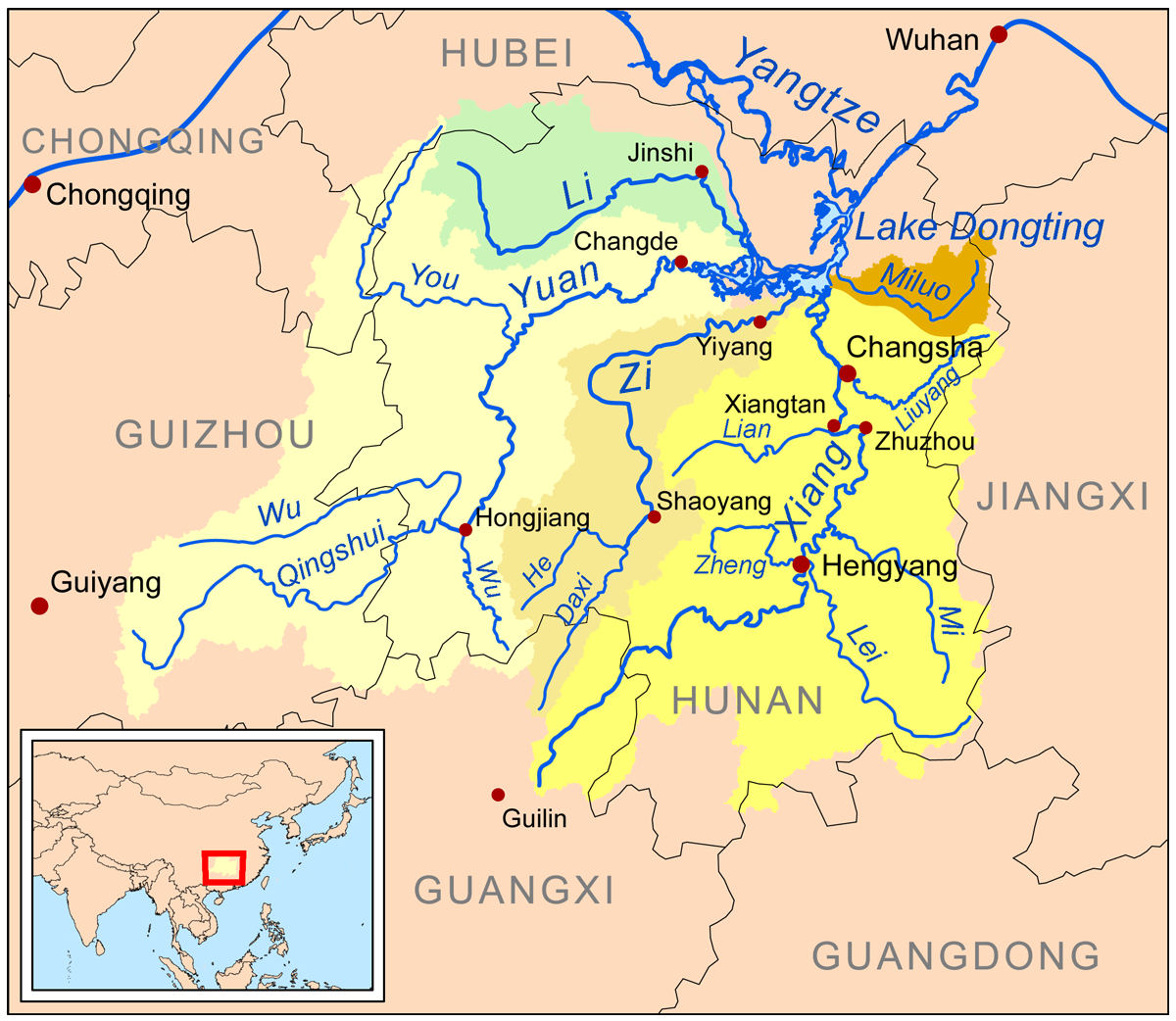
- Map showing the Zi River basin

- Location of mouth in Hunan Province

Location
- Country: China
- Province: Hunan

Physical characteristics
- Mouth
  - coordinates: 28.8°N 112.633°E

The Zi River (资水) in Hunan, China, flows into the Yangtze River via Lake Dongting.
