= Loudi =

Loudi 娄底市 Louti
- Prefecture-level city
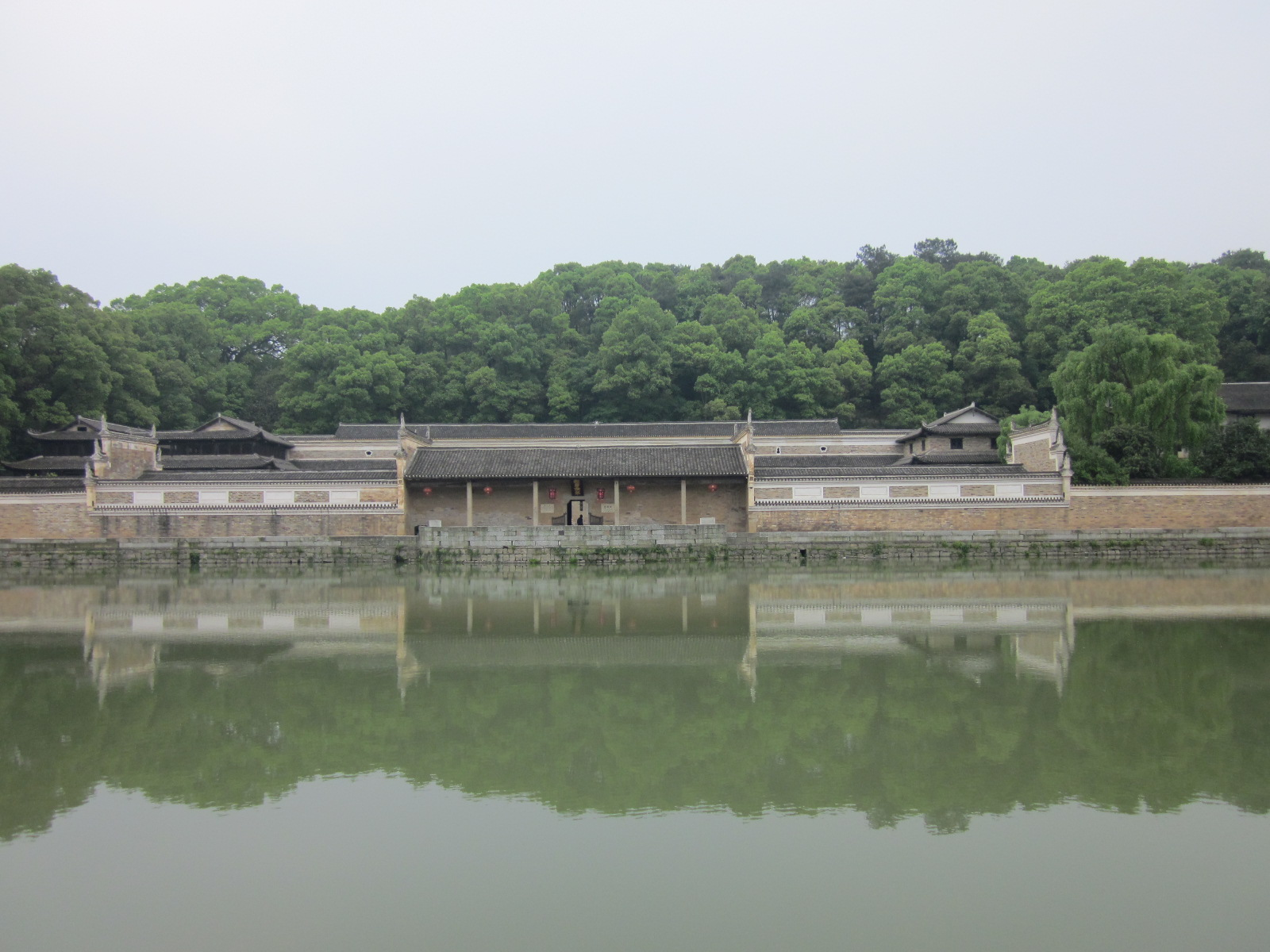
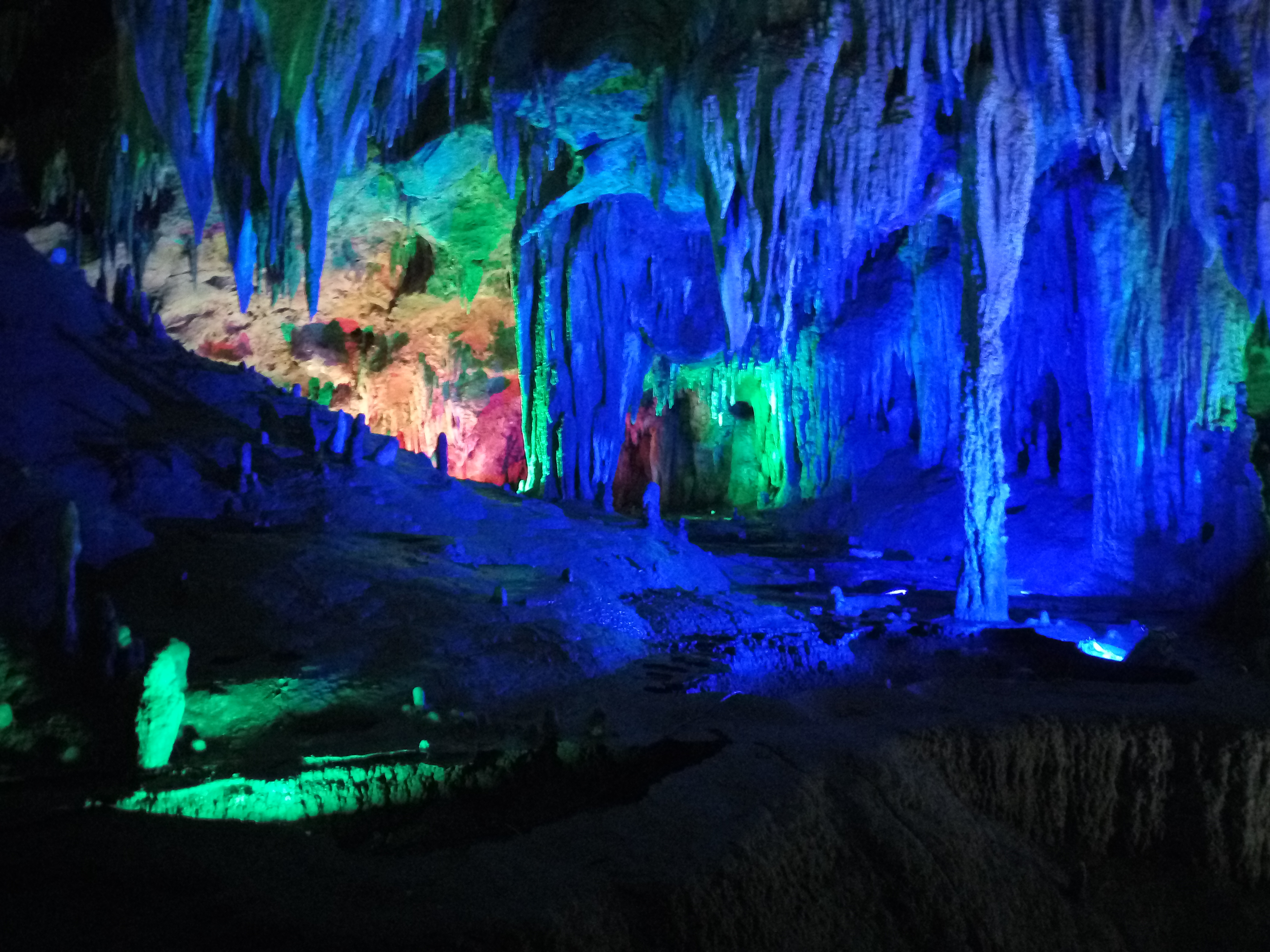
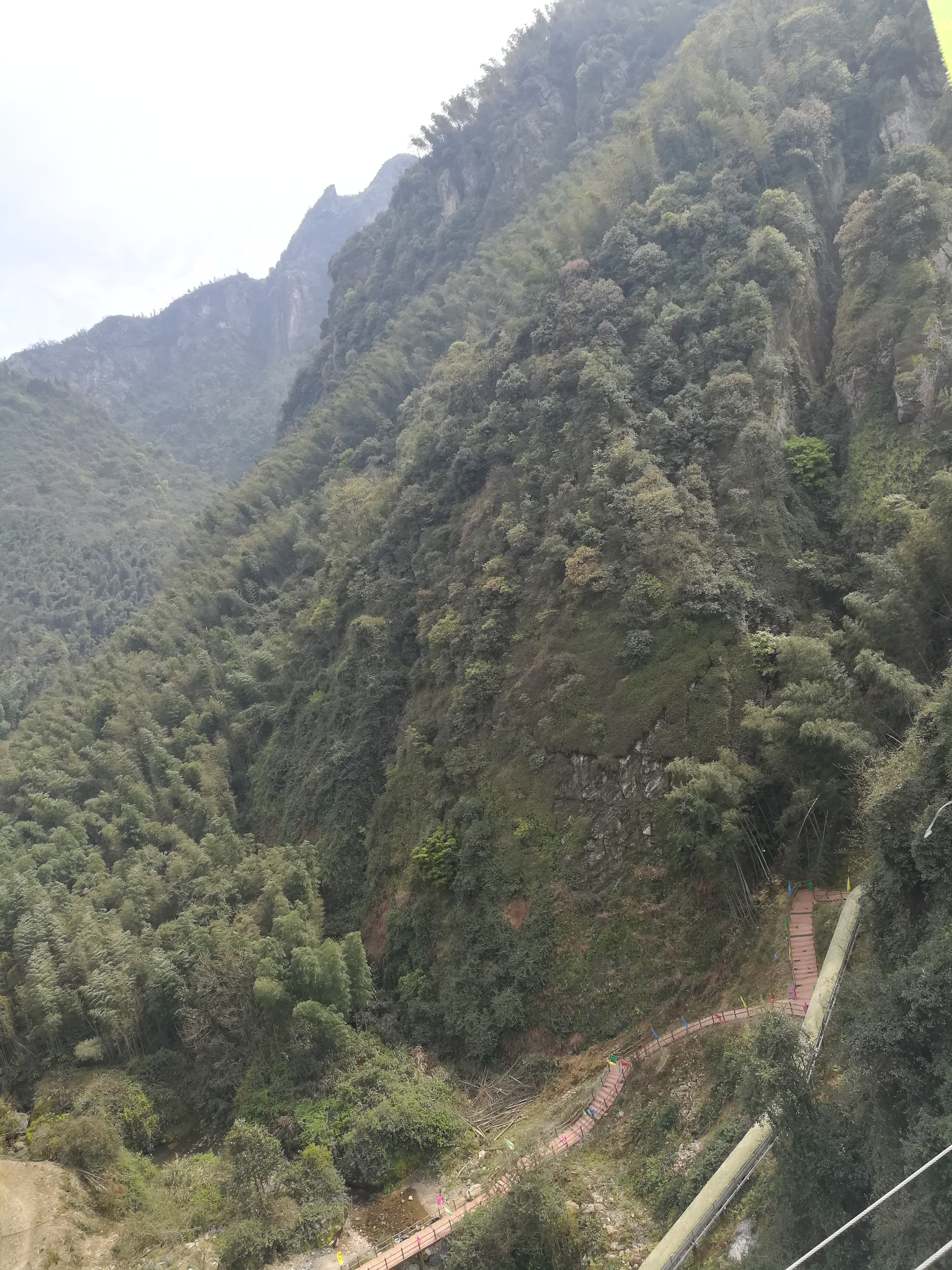
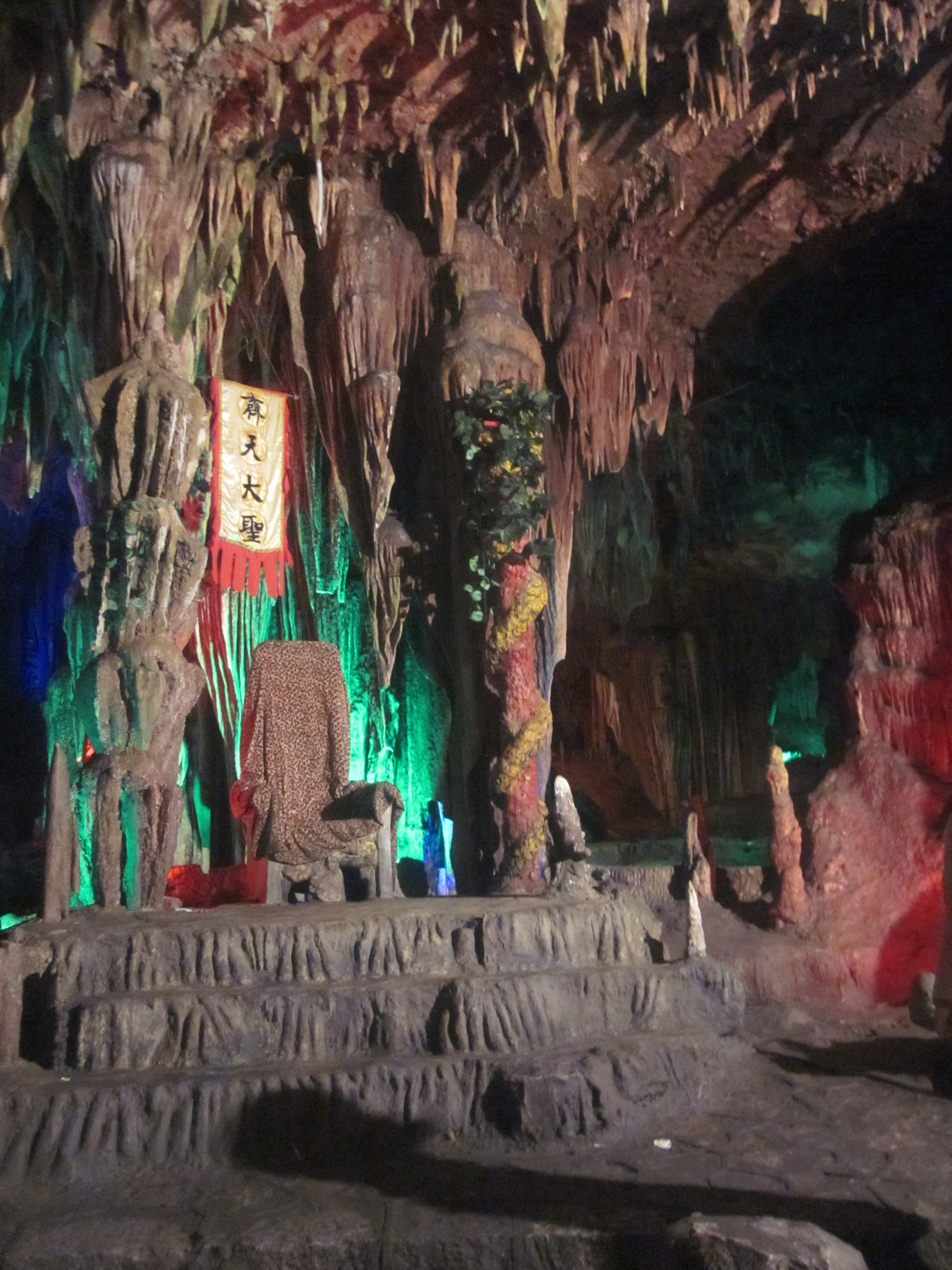
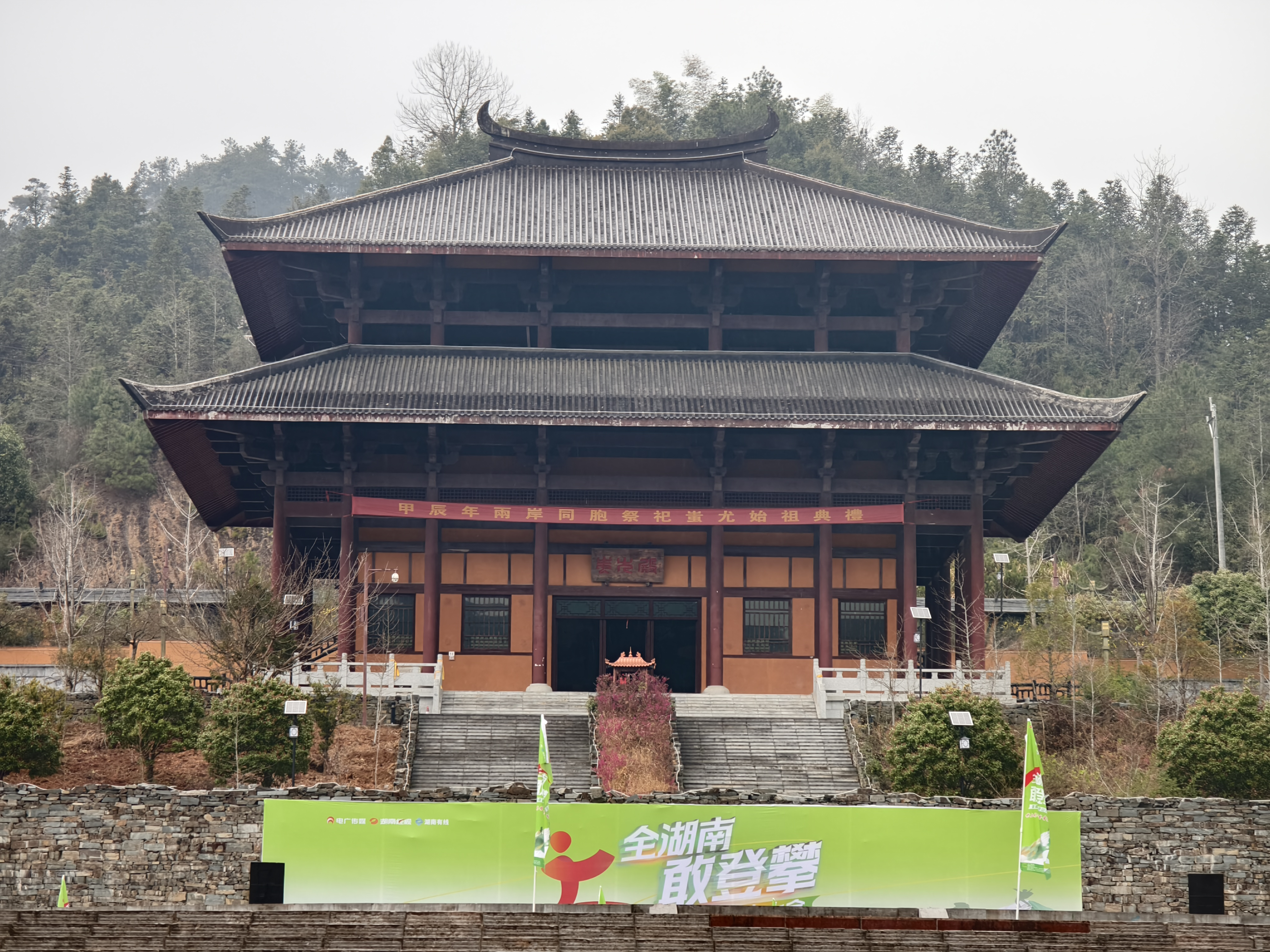
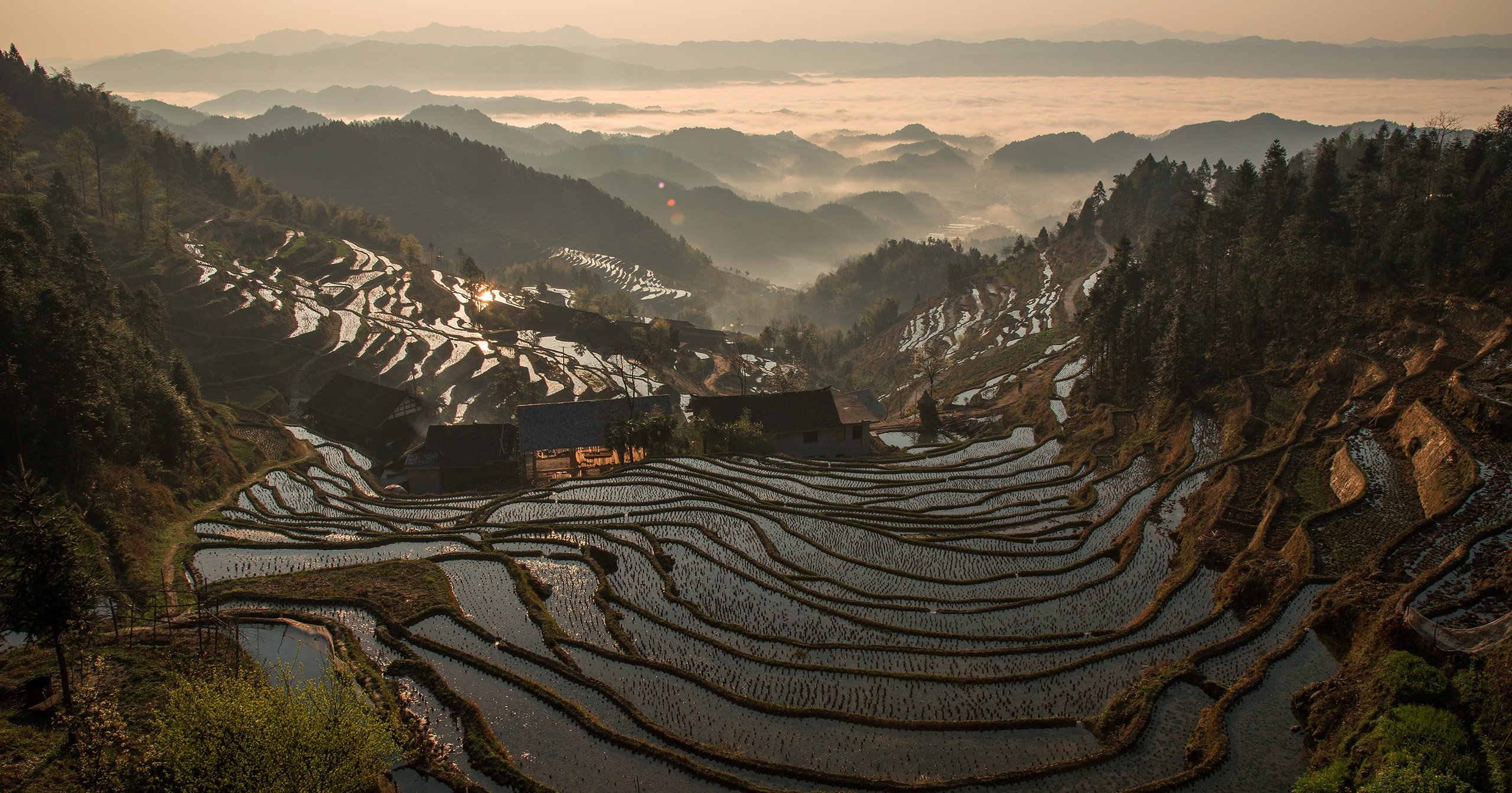
- Former Residence of Zeng Guofan Meishan Dragon Palace Longshan National Forest Park Boyue Cave Daxiong Mountain National Forest Park Ziquejie Terraces

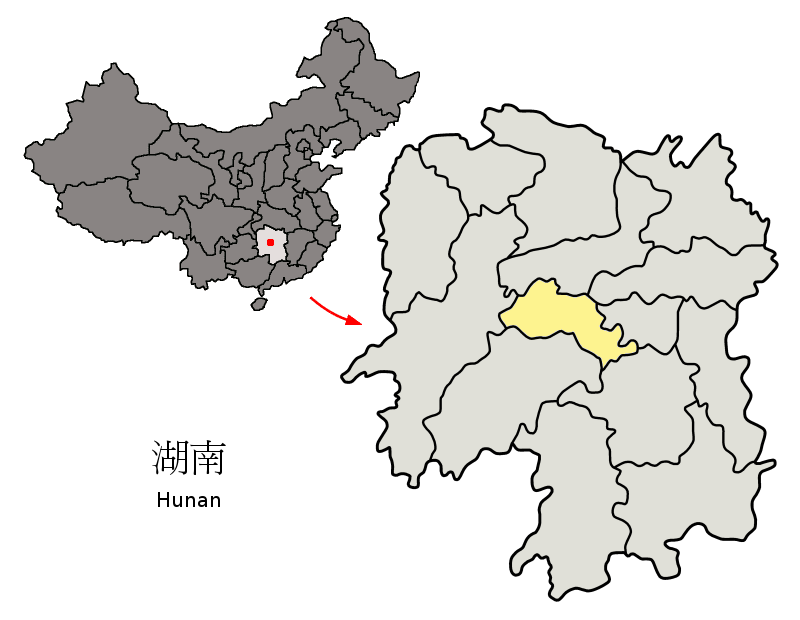
- Loudi administrative area within Hunan

- Location of the city center in Hunan
- Coordinates (Shima Park): 27°44′11″N 112°00′45″E
- Country: People's Republic of China
- Province: Hunan
- County-level divisions: 5
- Township-level divisions: 88
- Municipal seat: Louxing District

Area
  - Prefecture-level city: 8,117 km^{2} (3,134 sq mi)
  - Urban (2017): 62.20 km^{2} (24.02 sq mi)
  - Districts: 428.0 km^{2} (165.3 sq mi)

Population (2010 Census)
  - Prefecture-level city: 3,785,627
  - Density: 466.4/km^{2} (1,208/sq mi)
  - Urban (2017): 500,200
  - Districts: 649,000

GDP
  - Prefecture-level city: CN¥ 193.0 billion US$ 28.6 billion
  - Per capita: CN¥ 43,195; US$ 6,423
- Time zone: UTC+08:00 (China Standard)
- Postal code: 417000
- ISO 3166 code: CN-HN-13
- Website: hnloudi.gov.cn

Loudi (Chinese: 娄底; pinyin: Lóudǐ) is a prefecture-level city located in central Hunan province, China. It is situated about 110 km (68 mi) southwest of the provincial capital of Changsha and is considered to be a small- to medium-sized city within the province. According to the 2010 Census, the population of Loudi is of 3,785,627 inhabitants in an area of 8,117 km^{2} (3,134 sq mi).The geographical coordinates are 111°56′—112°03′ east longitude and 27°41′—27°47′ north latitude. With superior geographical location and convenient transportation, it has been the main strategic hinterland of Hunan Province and a key point connecting north and south and east and west since ancient times.In 2007, the city was named China's top ten livable cities by Chinese Cities Brand Value Report, which was released at the 2007 Beijing Summit of China Cities Forum.

== Geography ==
Loudi has an area of 8,107 km^{2} (3,130 sq mi).

The western parts of the city borders mountainous regions while the east parts is generally considered hilly with gently sloping topography.

== Climate ==
The climate is subtropical monsoon climate with humid weather and four distinct seasons.

Its basic characteristics are a warm climate with distinct four seasons; hot summers, cold winters and cool autumns; heavy rains in late spring and early summer, and droughts in midsummer and early autumn; more accumulated temperature and a long growing season; diverse climate types and obvious three-dimensional changes.

Climate data for Loudi, elevation 206 m (676 ft), (1991–2020 normals, extremes 1981–2010)
Month	Jan	Feb	Mar	Apr	May	Jun	Jul	Aug	Sep	Oct	Nov	Dec	Year
Record high °C (°F)	23.4 (74.1)	29.7 (85.5)	33.6 (92.5)	35.5 (95.9)	36.7 (98.1)	37.9 (100.2)	39.7 (103.5)	41.2 (106.2)	38.5 (101.3)	36.0 (96.8)	32.4 (90.3)	24.2 (75.6)	41.2 (106.2)
Mean daily maximum °C (°F)	8.9 (48.0)	11.7 (53.1)	16.0 (60.8)	22.5 (72.5)	26.9 (80.4)	29.8 (85.6)	33.3 (91.9)	33.0 (91.4)	29.0 (84.2)	23.6 (74.5)	17.8 (64.0)	11.8 (53.2)	22.0 (71.6)
Daily mean °C (°F)	5.6 (42.1)	8.0 (46.4)	11.9 (53.4)	17.9 (64.2)	22.4 (72.3)	25.8 (78.4)	29.0 (84.2)	28.3 (82.9)	24.4 (75.9)	19.1 (66.4)	13.4 (56.1)	7.9 (46.2)	17.8 (64.0)
Mean daily minimum °C (°F)	3.1 (37.6)	5.3 (41.5)	8.9 (48.0)	14.4 (57.9)	18.9 (66.0)	22.7 (72.9)	25.5 (77.9)	24.8 (76.6)	21.0 (69.8)	15.7 (60.3)	10.1 (50.2)	4.9 (40.8)	14.6 (58.3)
Record low °C (°F)	−5.1 (22.8)	−4.7 (23.5)	−1.6 (29.1)	3.1 (37.6)	9.8 (49.6)	14.7 (58.5)	19.0 (66.2)	16.6 (61.9)	12.6 (54.7)	4.2 (39.6)	−1.3 (29.7)	−9.2 (15.4)	−9.2 (15.4)
Average precipitation mm (inches)	67.7 (2.67)	75.7 (2.98)	138.5 (5.45)	170.3 (6.70)	206.1 (8.11)	234.5 (9.23)	155.0 (6.10)	119.2 (4.69)	64.8 (2.55)	65.3 (2.57)	70.1 (2.76)	52.2 (2.06)	1,419.4 (55.87)
Average precipitation days (≥ 0.1 mm)	13.7	14.0	17.9	17.0	16.3	15.6	10.7	11.0	8.6	9.6	10.8	11.0	156.2
Average snowy days	5.1	2.8	0.6	0.1	0	0	0	0	0	0	0.2	1.8	10.6
Average relative humidity (%)	76	76	78	77	77	80	74	74	74	72	73	71	75
Mean monthly sunshine hours	63.4	61.7	80.1	108.4	133.7	133.2	217.4	196.6	149.7	126.8	113.2	94.8	1,479
Percentage possible sunshine	19	19	22	28	32	32	52	49	41	36	35	30	33
Source: China Meteorological Administration

== History ==
Before the Qin dynasty (221–210 BC) established a court, it belonged to the Chu, a vassal state to the Zhou dynasty.

== Subdivisions ==
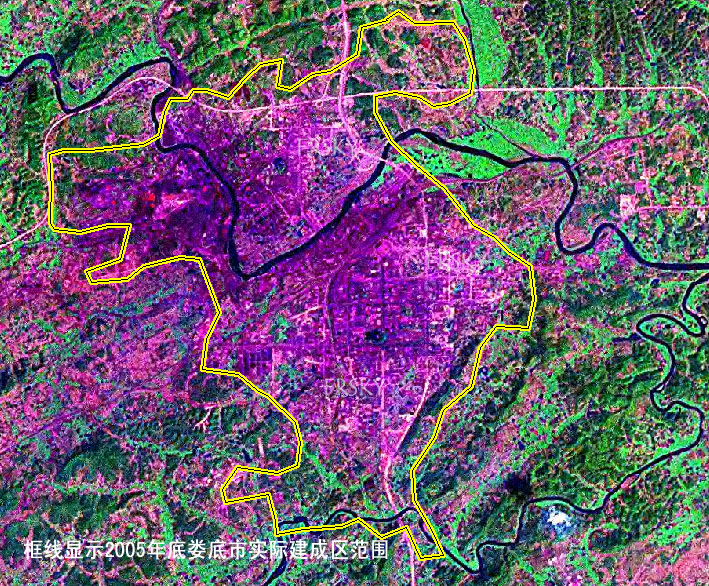
Satellite image of Loudi city

Loudi administers one district, two county-level cities, and two counties. The information here presented uses data from 2010 national census.

As of the end of 2024 and the beginning of 2025, the permanent population will be 830,100.

Map
English name	Simplified	Traditional	Pinyin	Area	Population	Density
Louxing District	娄星区	婁星區	Lóuxīng Qū	426	497,171	1,167
Lengshuijiang City	冷水江市		Lěngshuǐjiāng Shì	439	327,279	746
Lianyuan City	涟源市	漣源市	Liányuán Shì	1,895	995,712	525
Shuangfeng County	双峰县	雙峰縣	Shuāngfēng Xiàn	1,715	854,555	498
Xinhua County	新化县	新化縣	Xīnhuà Xiàn	3,642	1,110,910	305

== Government ==
The current CPC Party Secretary of Loudi is Li Jianguo and the current mayor is Yang Yiwen.

== Notable places ==
=== Ziquejie Terrace ===
Located in Xinhua County, Ziquejie Terrace features, layers upon layers of terraces are mapped like waves on the hills upon the mountains.

=== Boyue Cave ===
Boyue Cave scenic spot is a comprehensive park with karst as its main composition. It has an underground route of 1800 meters covering 40 thousand square meters.

=== Fairy Village ===
Fairy Villageis located in Wanbao Township, Loudi City, Hunan Province. With its magical, unique, beautiful and charming mountains, it was once known as the crown of the eight scenic spots in the hinterland of central Hunan.

=== The Eighteen Shengxian Caves ===
The Eighteen Shengxian Caves are located in Shuangjiang Township, about 27 kilometers away from the center of Loudi City, Hunan Province. The Eighteen Caves are headed by Shengxian Cave, Ziya Cave and Baiguo Cave.

== Economy ==
The city is heavily dependent on industry. In 2011, Loudi's GDP reached RMB 83.79 billion ($12.9 billion). In the first half of 2024, Loudi City's GDP was 100.218 billion yuan.

The biggest contributors come from the secondary industry where industry and construction amount to RMB 46.69 billion ($7.3billion USD), 55.75% of the city's GDP.

The city has rich natural resources. Coal mining, dressing, metallurgy, power production and supply, agricultural products processing, ceramics and construction materials are among the major industries of the city.
