= Huangnitang =

Huangnitang may refer to:

- Huangnitang, Loudi (黄泥塘街道), a subdistrict of Louxing District, Loudi City, Hunan.
- Huangnitang Village, Changshan (黄泥塘村), a village of Tianma Subdistrict, Changshan County, Zhejiang.
