= Huashan (disambiguation) =

Mount Hua or Huashan is a sacred mountain in Shaanxi, China

Huashan may also refer to the following locations in China:

- Huashan Rock Art, Guangxi
- Huashan District (花山区), Ma'anshan, Anhui
- Hua Hill (华不注山), in northeastern Jinan, Shandong
- Shandao Temple station, secondary station name is Huashan, a station of Taipei Metro

== Towns ==
=== 华山镇 ===
- Huashan, Shaanxi, where Mount Hua is located, Shaanxi
- Huashan, Beijing, in Pinggu District, Beijing
- Huashan, Feng County, Jiangsu
- Huashan, Jimo City, Shandong
- Huashan, Jinan, in Licheng District, Jinan, Shandong

=== 花山镇 ===
- Huashan, Guangzhou, in Huadu District, Guangzhou, Guangdong
- Huashan, Wuhan, in Hongshan District, Wuhan, Hubei
- Huashan, Linjiang, Jilin

== Townships ==
- Huashan Township, Bayan County (华山乡), Heilongjiang

=== 花山乡 ===
- Huashan Township, Ningxiang County, Hunan
- Huashan Township, Jingdong County, in Jingdong Yi Autonomous County, Yunnan
- Huashan Township, Zhenxiong County, Yunnan
- Huashan, Loudi (花山街道), a subdistrict of Louxing District, Loudi City, Hunan
