= Shuanglian =

Shuanglian may also refer to:

- Shuanglian metro station, a metro station of the Taipei Metro
- Shuanglian Pi (雙連埤), a lake in Huxi Village, Yuanshan Township, Yilan County
- Shuanglian Village (双联村), a village in Erfangping Township in Cili County, Hunan Province, China
- Shuanglian Village (双联村), a village in Gensi Township, Taixing, Jiangsu, China
- Shuanglian Village (双联村), a village in Xiaobi Township in Louxing District, Loudi City, Hunan Province, China
- Shuanglian Village (双联村), a village in Xuefeng Subdistrict in Louxing District, Dongkou County, Hunan Province, China
- Zhao Shuanglian (赵双连, (born 1957)), a government official of the People's Republic of China
