= Changqing =

Changqing may refer to:

== Locations ==
Changqing may refer to the following locations in China:

- Changqing District (长清区), Jinan, Shandong
- Changqing National Nature Reserve (长青自然保护区), in the Qinling Mountains of Shaanxi
- Changqing Road Station (长清路站), station of the Shanghai Metro
- Changqing, Fujian (长庆镇), town in Yongtai County
- Changqing, Jiangsu (常青镇), town in Rugao City

=== Subdistricts ===
- Changqing Subdistrict, Baicheng (长庆街道), in Taobei District, Baicheng, Jilin
- Changqing Subdistrict, Hangzhou (长庆街道), in Xiacheng District, Hangzhou, Zhejiang
- Changqing, Loudi (长青街道), a subdistrict of Louxing District, Loudi City, Hunan.

Written as "常青街道":

- Changqing Subdistrict, Jianghan District, Wuhan, Hubei
- Changqing Subdistrict, Hefei, in Baohe District, Hefei, Anhui
- Changqing Subdistrict, Ulanqab, in Jining District, Ulanqab, Inner Mongolia
- Changqing Subdistrict, Anshan, in Tiedong District, Anshan, Liaoning
- Changqing Subdistrict, Changzhi, in Chengqu, Changzhi, Shanxi

== People ==
- Sun Tzu, who was given the courtesy name Changqing (長卿)
