= Changqing, Loudi =

Changqing Subdistrict 长青街道
- Subdistrict
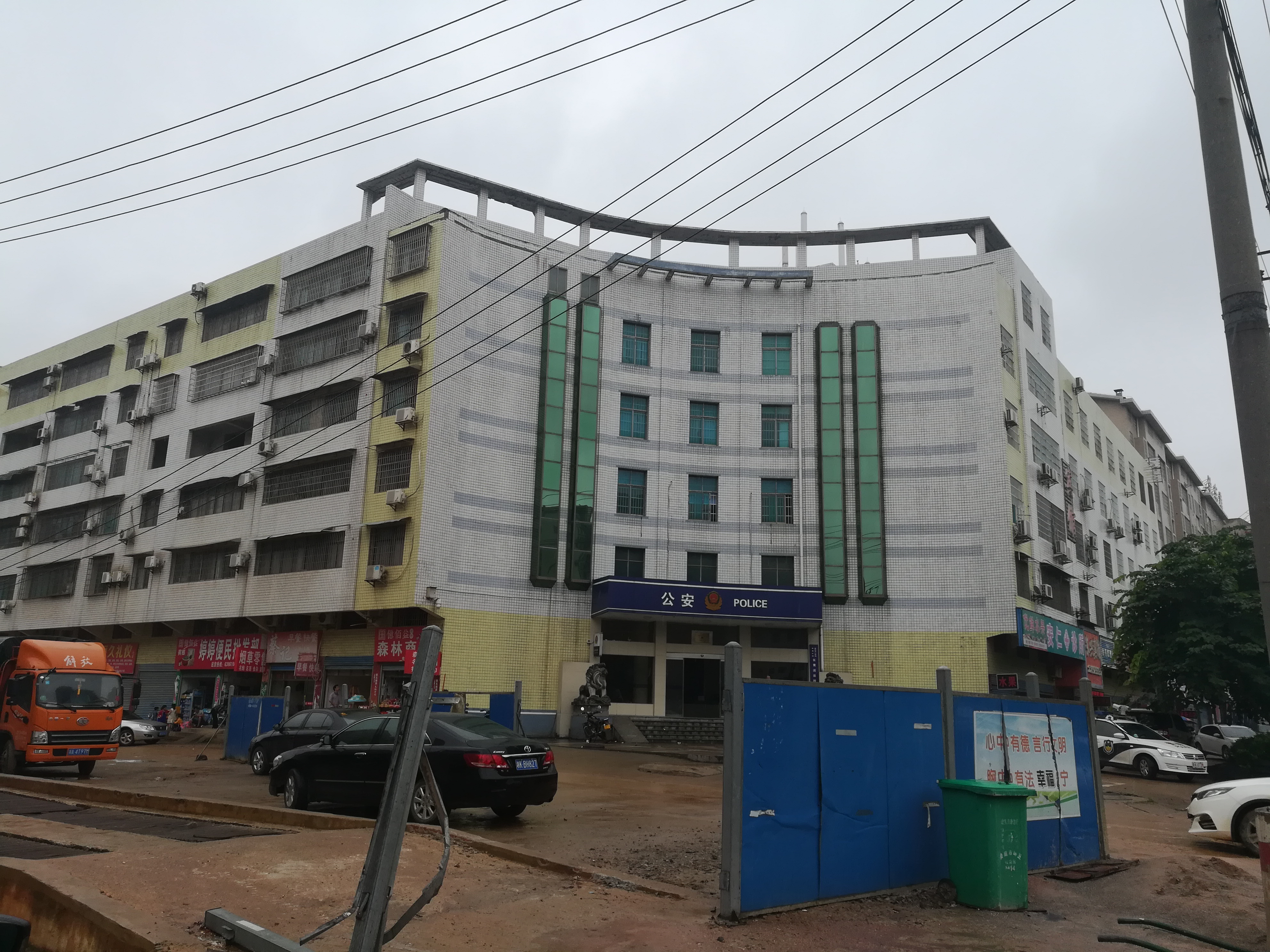
- The Changqing Police Station.

- Location in Hunan.
- Coordinates: 27°43′44″N 111°59′25″E
- Country: People's Republic of China
- Province: Hunan
- Prefecture-level city: Loudi
- District: Louxing

Area
  - Total: 5.5 km^{2} (2.1 sq mi)

Population (2015)
  - Total: 70,000
  - Density: 13,000/km^{2} (33,000/sq mi)
- Time zone: UTC+8 (China Standard)
- Postal code: 417000
- Area code: 0738

Changqing Subdistrict (simplified Chinese: 长青街道; traditional Chinese: 長青街道; pinyin: Chángqīng Jiēdào) is a subdistrict in Louxing Districtof Loudi City, Hunan Province, People's Republic of China.

== Administrative divisions ==
The subdistrict is divided into 9 communities, which include the following areas:

- Zhushan Community (竹山社区)
- Guanjia Community (关家社区)
- Gengtang Community (耕塘社区)
- Louxing Community (娄星社区)
- Xiaohua Community (小花社区)
- Dongxin Community (洞新社区)
- Changqing Community (长青社区)
- Fuqing Community (扶青社区)
- Ganzichong Community (甘子冲社区)

== Geography ==
Lianshui River, also known as the mother river, flows through the subdistrict.

== Economy ==
The local economy is primarily based upon commerce and local industry.

== Hospital ==
The Loudi Central Hospital is situated at the subdistrict. The Chinese Medicine Hospital of Loudi is also sits in the subdistrict.

== Education ==
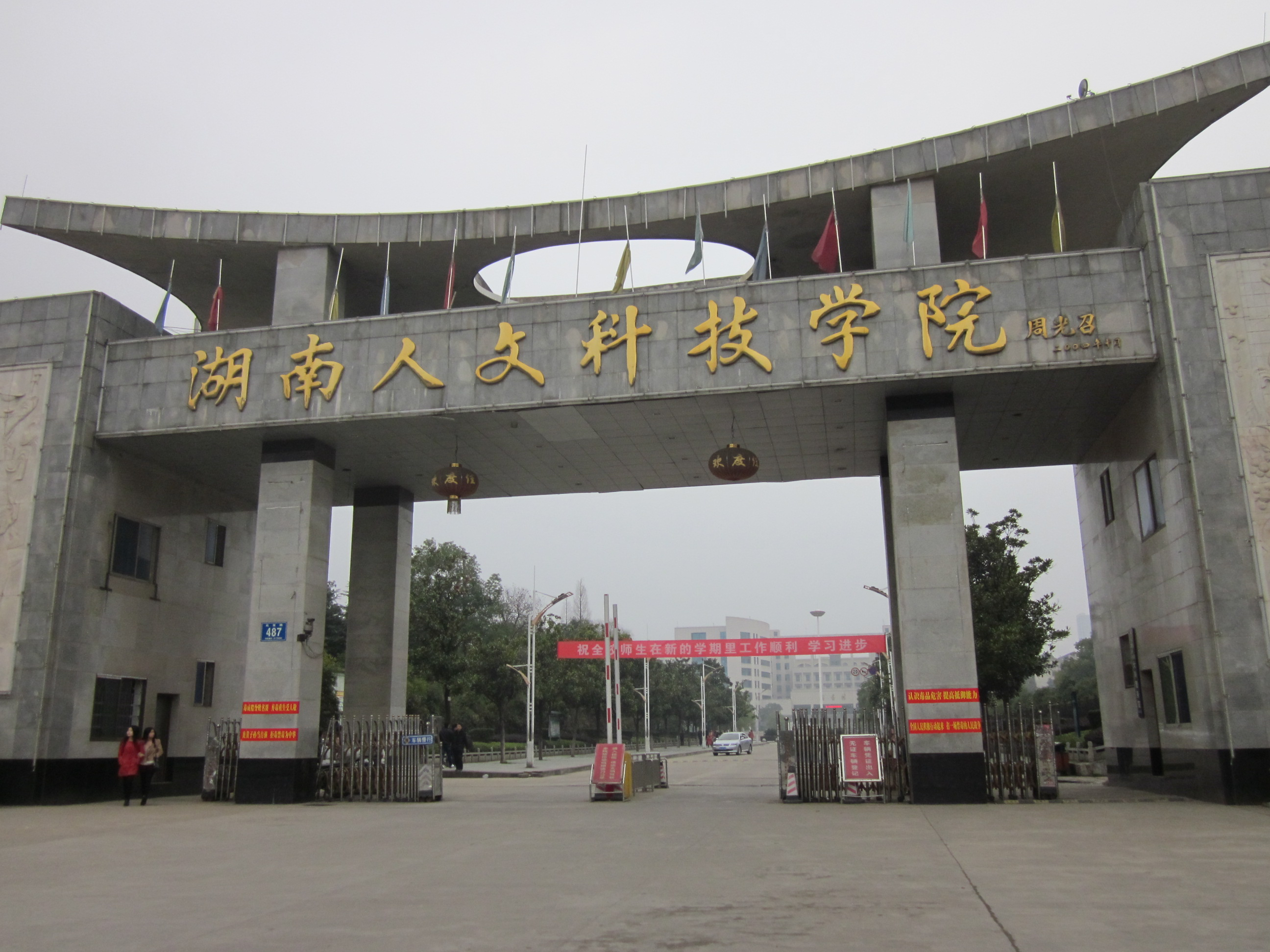
School gate of the Hunan University of Humanities, Science and Technology.

Hunan University of Humanities, Science and Technology is a state-owned provincial university in the subdistrict.

== Transportation ==
=== Railway ===
The Luoyang–Zhanjiang Railway, from Luoyang City, Henan Province to Zhanjiang City, Guangdong Province runs through the subdistrict.

The Shanghai–Kunming railway, more commonly known as "Hukun railway", is a west-east railway passing through the subdistrict.

== Attractions ==
Three public parks are located in the town: Shima Park, Zhushan Park (株山公园) and Xiannüzhai Ecological Park (仙女寨生态公园).
