= Wanbao, Loudi =

Wanbao Town 万宝镇
- Town
- Location in Hunan
- Coordinates: 27°39′20″N 111°59′52″E
- Country: People's Republic of China
- Province: Hunan
- Prefecture-level city: Loudi
- District: Louxing

Area
  - Total: 81.05 km^{2} (31.29 sq mi)

Population (2015)
  - Total: 44,500
  - Density: 549/km^{2} (1,420/sq mi)
- Time zone: UTC+8 (China Standard)
- Postal code: 417007
- Area code: 0738

Wanbao Town (simplified Chinese: 万宝镇; traditional Chinese: 萬寶鎮; pinyin: Wànbǎo Zhèn) is a rural town in Louxing District of Loudi City, Hunan Province, People's Republic of China. As of the 2015 census it had a population of 4,4500 and an area of 81.05 square kilometres (31.29 sq mi).

== History ==
In 2015, Chayuan Town was merged into Wanbao Town.

== Administrative divisions ==
The town is divided into 24 villages, which include the following areas: Xinping Village, Zhushan Village, Wanbao Village, Longjing Village, Wangxing Village, Bajiao Village, Qunyi Village, Gaochong Village, Qingshan Village, Hushi Village, Jiangxi Village, Shibu Village, Yagu Village, Moshi Village, Xinbai Village, Qingjiang Village, Fushan Village, Datang Village, Kuangjia Village, Xinzhi Village, Dongfanghong Village, Qiaoquan Village, Shilin Village, and Fuchong Village (新坪村、株山村、万宝村、龙井村、旺兴村、芭蕉村、群益村、高冲村、青山村、浒石村、江溪村、石埠村、垭古村、磨石村、新柏村、清江村、福善村、大塘村、匡家村、新致村、东方红村、乔泉村、石林村、富冲村).

== Geography ==
The town is bordered to the north by Dake Subdistrict, to the east by Maotian Town of Xiangxiang, to the south by the towns of Hongshandian and Shexingshan, to the southwest by Hetang Town, and to the northwest by Shuidongdi Town.

== Transportation ==
=== Provincial Highway ===
Provincial Highway S209 is a major north-south highway runs through the town.

=== Railway ===
The Luoyang–Zhanjiang Railway, from Luoyang City, Henan Province to Zhanjiang City, Guangdong Province runs through the town.

The Shanghai–Kunming high-speed railway runs west-east through the southern town.

=== Expressway ===
S70 Loudi–Huaihua Expressway, more commonly known as "Louhuai Expressway", is a west-east highway passing through the town.
