= Shijing, Loudi =

Shijing Town 石井镇
- Town
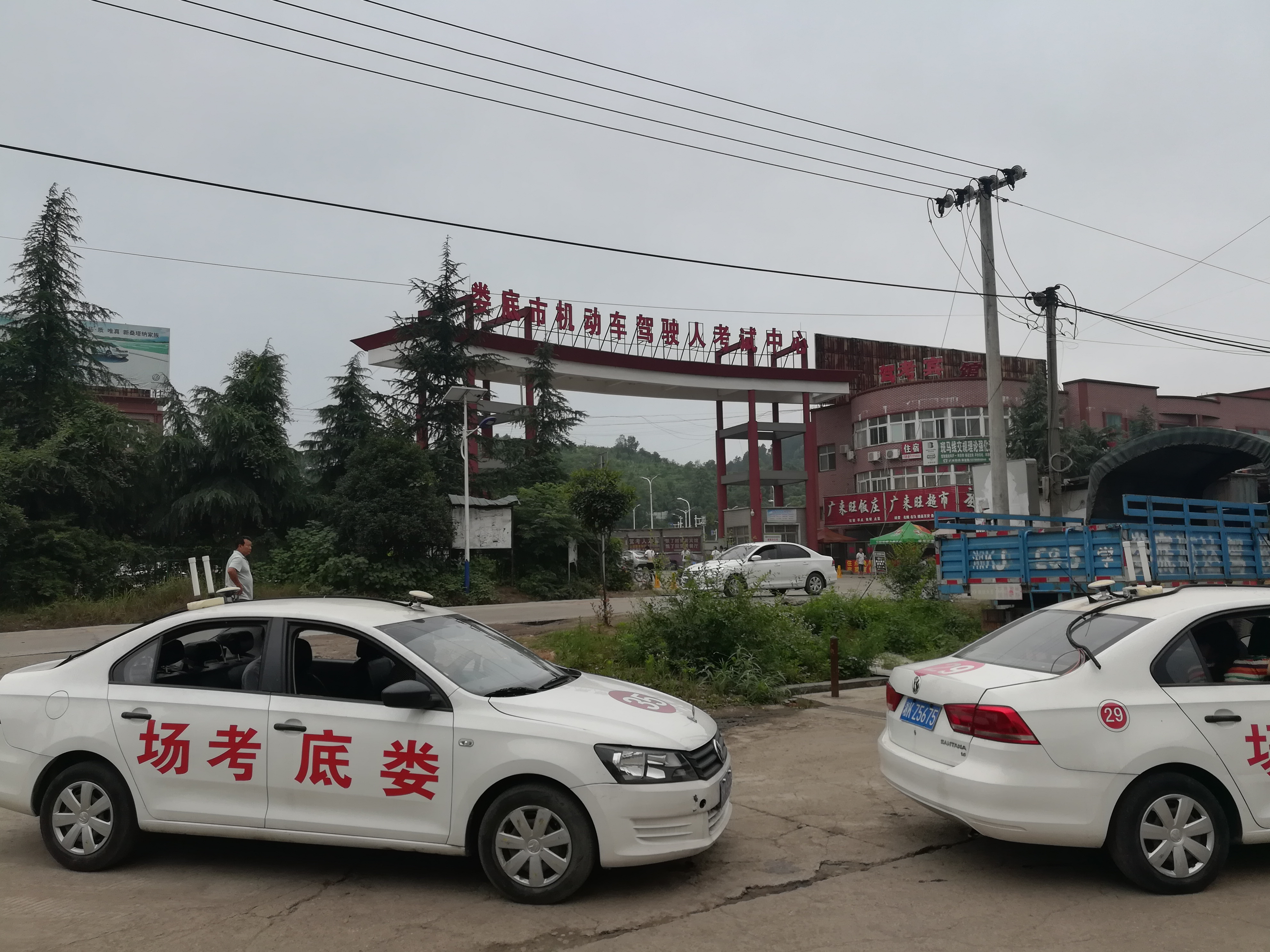
- The Motor Vehicle Driver Examination Center in Shijing Town.

- Location in Hunan
- Coordinates: 27°46′10″N 111°55′19″E
- Country: People's Republic of China
- Province: Hunan
- Prefecture-level city: Loudi
- District: Louxing

Area
  - Total: 65 km^{2} (25 sq mi)

Population (2015)
  - Total: 37,900
  - Density: 580/km^{2} (1,500/sq mi)
- Time zone: UTC+8 (China Standard)
- Postal code: 417099
- Area code: 0738

Shijing Town (simplified Chinese: 石井镇; traditional Chinese: 石井鎮; pinyin: Shíjǐng Zhèn) is a rural town in Louxing District of Loudi City, Hunan Province, People's Republic of China. As of the 2015 census it had a population of 37,900 and an area of 65 square kilometres (25 sq mi).

== History ==
In 2015, Baimu Township was merged into Shijing Town.

== Administrative divisions ==
The town is divided into 16 villages, which include the following areas: Tanjia Village, Zushi Village, Baiyunshi Village, Dayue Village, Sangui Village, Douguang Village, Shijing Village, Huilong Village, Songjiang Village, Huanjiang Village, Shijiang Village, Shuikou Village, Jiaolong Village, Zexi Village, Shanquan Village, and Jiangxi Village (谭家村、祖师村、白云石村、大跃村、三圭村、斗光村、石井村、回龙村、松江村、环江村、石江村、水口村、蛟龙村、泽溪村、山泉村、江溪村).

== Geography ==
The town shares a border with Dutoutang Town of Lianyuan to the west, Lianbin Subdistrict to the east, Qiaotouhe Town to the north, and Shuidongdi Town to the south.

== Transportation ==
=== Provincial Highway ===
Provincial Highway S312 travels through the town west to east.

=== Railway ===
A north-south railway runs through the east of the town.
