= Lianbin, Loudi =

Lianbin Subdistrict 涟滨街道
- Subdistrict
- Location in Hunan.
- Coordinates: 27°45′25″N 111°59′09″E
- Country: People's Republic of China
- Province: Hunan
- Prefecture-level city: Loudi
- District: Louxing District

Area
  - Total: 28 km^{2} (11 sq mi)

Population (2015)
  - Total: 41,500
  - Density: 1,500/km^{2} (3,800/sq mi)
- Time zone: UTC+8 (China Standard)
- Postal code: 417000
- Area code: 0738

Lianbin Subdistrict (simplified Chinese: 涟滨街道; traditional Chinese: 漣濱街道; pinyin: Liánbīn Jiēdào) is a subdistrict in Louxing District of Loudi City, Hunan Province, People's Republic of China. As of the 2015 census it had a population of 41,500 and an area of 28 square kilometres (11 sq mi).

== Administrative divisions ==
The subdistrict is divided into 2 villages and 8 communities, which include the following areas:

- Xianrenge Community (仙人阁社区)
- Gaoche Community (高车社区)
- Taibao Community (太保社区)
- Chengqing Community (澄清社区)
- Jiulun Community (九仑社区)
- Minfu Community (民福社区)
- Xianrenqiao Community (仙人桥社区)
- Maotang Community (茅塘社区)
- Xiping Village (西坪村)
- Guancao Village (冠曹村)

== Economy ==
The local economy is primarily based upon commerce and local industry.

The Loudi Economic and Technological Development Zone is located in the town.

== Geography ==
Lianshui River, also known as the mother river, flows through the subdistrict.

== Transportation ==
=== Provincial Highway ===
Provincial Highway S209 passes across the subdistrict north to south.

=== Railway ===
The Luoyang–Zhanjiang Railway, from Luoyang City, Henan Province to Zhanjiang City, Guangdong Province runs through the subdistrict.

== Attractions ==
Chengqing Pagoda (澄清塔) is a famous scenic spot in the subdistrict. It was originally built between 1899 and 1900 during the reign of Guangxu Emperor in the Qing dynasty. The 12-metre (39 ft) pagoda has the brick structure with three storeys and eight sides. In July 1995, it was designated as a municipal level cultural preservation unit.
