= Shanshan, Loudi =

Shanshan Town 杉山镇
- Town
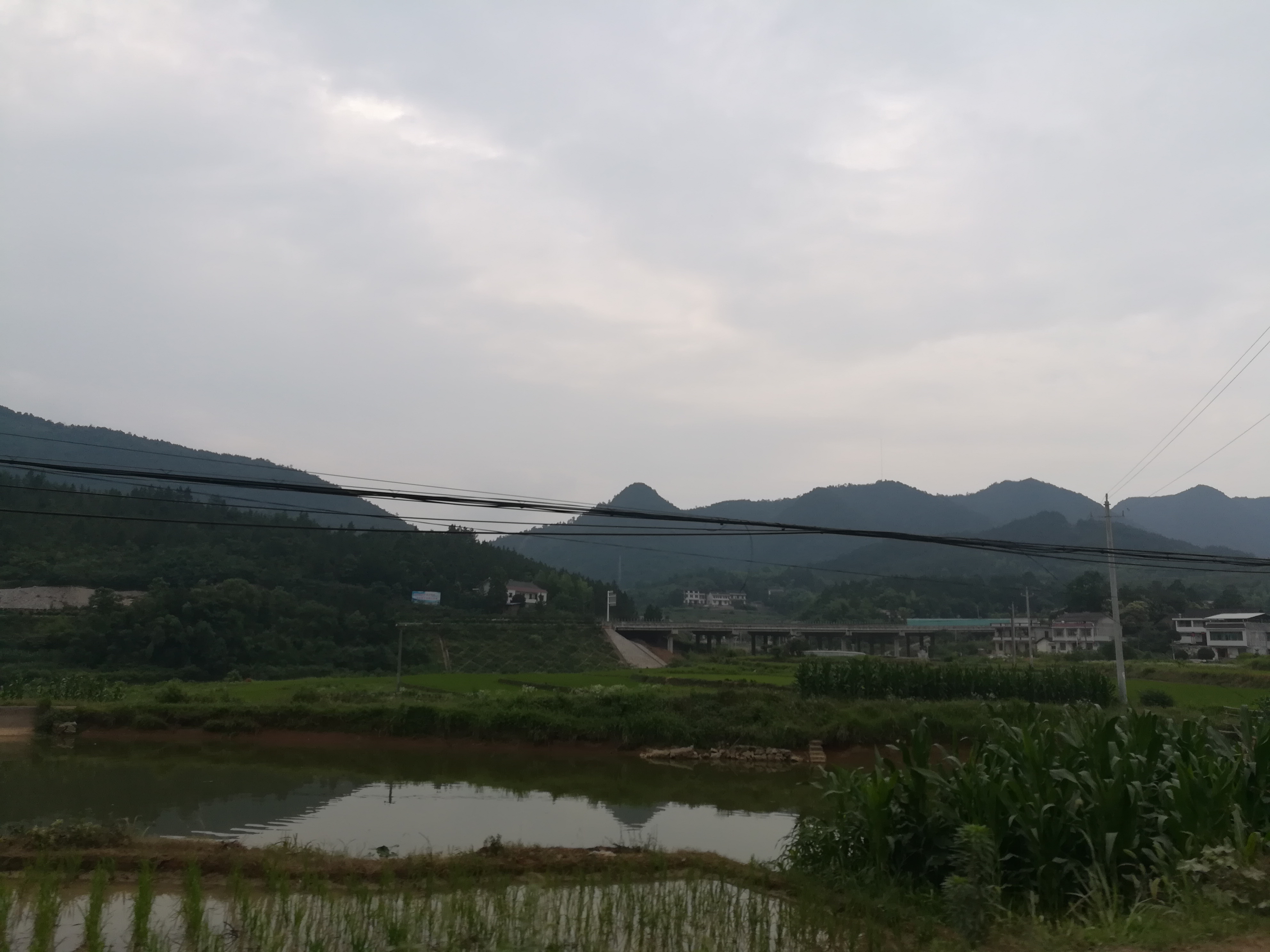
- Fields and mountains in Shanshan Town.

- Location in Hunan
- Coordinates: 27°49′13″N 112°00′59″E
- Country: People's Republic of China
- Province: Hunan
- Prefecture-level city: Loudi
- District: Louxing District

Area
  - Total: 66.38 km^{2} (25.63 sq mi)

Population (2015)
  - Total: 43,200
  - Density: 651/km^{2} (1,690/sq mi)
- Time zone: UTC+8 (China Standard)
- Postal code: 417004
- Area code: 0738

Shanshan Town (simplified Chinese: 杉山镇; traditional Chinese: 杉山鎮; pinyin: Shānshān Zhèn) is a rural town in Louxing District of Loudi City, Hunan Province, People's Republic of China. As of the 2015 census it had a population of 43,200 and an area of 66.38 square kilometres (25.63 sq mi).

== History ==
In 2015, Xiaobi Township was merged into Shanshan Town.

== Administrative divisions ==
The town is divided into 18 villages and 1 community, which include the following areas:

- Enkou Community (恩口社区)
- Shanshan Village (杉山村)
- Huaxi Village (花溪村)
- Tangping Village (塘坪村)
- Tianwan Village (田湾村)
- Jiyun Village (集云村)
- Yaozi Village (鹞子村)
- Lisong Village (栗松村)
- Wanle Village (万乐村)
- Mushan Village (木山村)
- Siji Village (四季村)
- Quanfu Village (泉福村)
- Tianping Village (田坪村)
- Batang Village (坝塘村)
- Ranpu Village (染铺村)
- Leshan Village (乐善村)
- Shidi Village (石底村)
- Shilong Village (石龙村)
- Shiyuan Village (石垣村)

== Geography ==
The town shares a border with Shijing Town to the west, Fanjiang Town to the east, Hutian Town of Xiangxiang to the northeast, Shuangjiang Township to the northwest, and Lianbin Subdistrict to the south.

== Transportation ==
=== Provincial Highway ===
Provincial Highway S209 is a north–south highway in the town.

=== Expressway ===
Changsha-Shaoshan-Loudi Expressway passes across the township east to west.

=== Railway ===
The Luoyang–Zhanjiang Railway, from Luoyang City, Henan Province to Zhanjiang City, Guangdong Province, through the town.
