= Leping, Loudi =

Leping Subdistrict 乐坪街道
- Subdistrict
- Location in Hunan.
- Coordinates: 27°43′52″N 112°00′06″E
- Country: People's Republic of China
- Province: Hunan
- Prefecture-level city: Loudi
- District: Louxing District

Area
  - Total: 10 km^{2} (3.9 sq mi)

Population (2015)
  - Total: 85,000
  - Density: 8,500/km^{2} (22,000/sq mi)
- Time zone: UTC+8 (China Standard)
- Postal code: 417000
- Area code: 0738

Leping Subdistrict (simplified Chinese: 乐坪街道; traditional Chinese: 樂坪街道; pinyin: Lèpíng Jiēdào) is a subdistrict in Louxing District of Loudi City, Hunan Province, People's Republic of China.

== Administrative divisions ==
The subdistrict is divided into 12 communities, which include the following areas:

- Jiexin Community (街心社区)
- Xiantong Community (贤童社区)
- Tongjia Community (童家社区)
- Mifeng Community (蜜峰社区)
- Qingquan Community (清泉社区)
- Changchun Community (长春社区)
- Liaojia Community (廖家社区)
- Xinjian Community (新建社区)
- Yuetang Community (月塘社区)
- Datang Community (大塘社区)
- Jingu Community (金谷社区)
- Huochezhan Community (火车站社区)

== Geography ==
Lianshui River flows through the subdistrict.

== Economy ==
The economy is supported primarily by commerce and local industry.

== Transportation ==
Loudi railway station serves the subdistrict.

== Notable people ==
- Li Buyun (李步云), Honorary dean of the College of Law, Hunan University.
- Wu Linsheng (邬林生), revolutionary.
- Wei Huazheng (魏华政), calligrapher.
