= Shexingshan =

Shexingshan Town 蛇形山镇
- Town
- Location in Hunan.
- Coordinates: 27°35′24″N 112°04′46″E
- Country: People's Republic of China
- Province: Hunan
- Prefecture-level city: Loudi
- District: Louxing District

Area
  - Total: 119 km^{2} (46 sq mi)

Population (2017)
  - Total: 68,300
  - Density: 574/km^{2} (1,490/sq mi)
- Time zone: UTC+8 (China Standard)
- Postal code: 417722
- Area code: 0738

Shexingshan (simplified Chinese: 蛇形山镇; traditional Chinese: 蛇形山鎮; pinyin: Shéxíngshān Zhèn) is a rural town in Louxing District of Loudi, Hunan, China. It has an area of 119 km^{2} (46 sq mi) with a population of 68,300 (as of 2017). The town has 37 villages and a community under its jurisdiction.

== History ==
Two villages of Zimu (梓木村) and Gutang (古塘村) were transferred from Hongshandian Town to Shexingshan in January 2017. The town of Shexingshan was transferred from Shuangfeng County to Louxing on January 24, 2017.

== Administrative divisions ==
The town is divided into 57 villages and 2 communities which consist of: Gaowu Community, Lixin Community, Fengshutai Village, Hongfu Village, Caolai Village, Qingling Village, Shexing Village, Fengxing Village, Shiwan Village, Hongqiao Village, Chongkou Village, Tanwan Village, Wanfu Village, Nantang Village, Quankou Village, Qiuhu Village, Dangjia Village, Dingzhu Village, Nidang Village, Qinlun Village, Nichong Village, Shuangquan Village, Quanshan Village, Yueshan Village, Quanchong Village, Xinyang Village, Shanhe Village, Kangnan Village, Jinbu Village, Yaoqiao Village, Hengzhong Village, Gaotang Village, Xinlian Village, Xinhong Village, Nankou Village, Huangjing Village, Huaqiao Village, Tianjing Village, Chidian Village, Risheng Village, Nongsheng Village, Shanmu Village, Shangshanmu Village, Jinxi Village, Dalu Village, Mayang Village, Yanjia Village, Longtanjiang Village, Guangyao Village, Xinzeng Village, Wanqian Village, Qiaojia Village, Baizhu Village, Batang Village, Anshan Village, Quantang Village, Fuzhou Village, Shirui Village, and Xinlai Village (高屋社区、立新社区、枫树台村、洪福村、曹来村、青岭村、蛇形村、凤形村、石湾村、洪桥村、冲口村、檀湾村、万富村、南塘村、泉口村、秋湖村、当家村、丁祝村、泥凼村、秦仑村、泥冲村、双泉村、泉山村、越山村、泉冲村、新洋村、杉河村、康南村、进步村、姚桥村、恒中村、高塘村、新连村、新红村、南口村、黄井村、花桥村、天井村、赤典村、日升村、农升村、杉木村、上杉木村、金溪村、大路村、麻洋村、鄢家村、龙潭江村、光耀村、新增村、万乾村、乔家村、白竹村、坝塘村、鞍山村、泉塘村、扶洲村、世瑞村、新来村).

== Geography ==
The town shares a border with Hongshandian Town to the west, Xingzipu Town to the east, Wanbao Town to the northwest, Maotian Town to the northeast, and Zoumajie Town to the south.

The highest point in the town is Mount Baishiyan (白石岩) which stands 343 metres (1,125 ft) above sea level.

== Transportation ==
=== Expressway ===
G60 Shanghai–Kunming Expressway passes across the town north to south.

=== Railway ===
Loudi–Shaoyang railway runs north-south through the west of the town.
