= Shuidongdi =

Shuidongdi Town 水洞底镇
- Town
- Location in Hunan
- Coordinates: 27°41′05″N 111°53′59″E
- Country: People's Republic of China
- Province: Hunan
- Prefecture-level city: Loudi
- District: Louxing

Area
  - Total: 89 km^{2} (34 sq mi)

Population (2015)
  - Total: 45,000
  - Density: 510/km^{2} (1,300/sq mi)
- Time zone: UTC+8 (China Standard)
- Postal code: 417118
- Area code: 0738

Shuidongdi (Chinese: 水洞底镇; pinyin: Shuǐdòngdǐ Zhèn) is a rural town in Louxing District of Loudi, Hunan, China. It has an area of 89 km^{2} (34 sq mi) with a population of 40,943 (as of 2010 census). The town has 24 villages and a community under its jurisdiction. The town was transferred from Lianyuan City to Louxing on January 24, 2017.

== Administrative divisions ==
The town is divided into 45 villages and 1 community, which include the following areas: Xianghong Community, Chengtian Village, Qiushu Village, Changbu Village, Wenquan Village, Tiantang Village, Yutian Village, Dayuelong Village, Datian Village, Nanqiao Village, Xixi Village, Munong Village, Yangjiao Village, Jingchong Village, Tuoshan Village, Zhongxin Village, Shijiao Village, Niqing Village, Hongtu Village, Lishan Village, Zhujiao Village, Shuidongdi Village, Zhuyou Village, Muchang Village, Shishi Village, Hehua Village, Pantang Village, Xintang Village, Liutan Village, Shiquan Village, Huaishu Village, Huyan Village, Zhouguan Village, Bailong Village, Baihuang Village, Xinshi Village, Guozhu Village, Xiaoyang Village, Yangcai Village, Sanqiao Village, Yunhua Village, Hongquan Village, Jintang Village, Yunshan Village, and Gaoxian Village (向红社区、撑田村、球树村、长步村、温泉村、天堂村、雨田村、大岳垅村、大田村、南桥村、西溪村、慕农村、羊角村、井冲村、托山村、中心村、石脚村、泥青村、红土村、理珊村、竹脚村、水洞底村、梽柚村、慕长村、石狮村、禾花村、潘塘村、新塘村、留坦村、石泉村、槐树村、虎岩村、周观村、白龙村、白晃村、新仕村、国柱村、小杨村、杨才村、三桥村、云华村、金华村、红泉村、金塘村、云山村、高枧村).

== Geography ==
The town is bordered to the north by Shijing Town, to the east by Wanbao Town, to the south by Hetang Town of Lianyuan, to the west by Doulishan Town, and to the southwest by Fengping Town.

== Transportation ==
=== Railway ===
The Luoyang–Zhanjiang Railway, from Luoyang City, Henan Province to Zhanjiang City, Guangdong Province runs through the town.

The Shanghai–Kunming high-speed railway runs west-east through the southern town.

=== Expressway ===
S70 Loudi–Huaihua Expressway, more commonly known as "Louhuai Expressway", is a west-east highway passing through the town.
