= Chayuan, Loudi =

Chayuan Town
- Town

Chinese transcription(s)
  - Simplified: 茶园镇
  - Traditional: 茶園鎮
  - Pinyin: Chayuan Zhen
- Location in China
- Coordinates: 27°38′58″N 112°02′11″E
- Country: People's Republic of China
- Province: Hunan
- City: Loudi
- district: Louxing District

Area
  - Total: 38.17 km^{2} (14.74 sq mi)

Population
  - Total: 18,000
  - Density: 470/km^{2} (1,200/sq mi)
- Time zone: UTC+8 (China Standard)
- Postal code: 417006
- Area code: 0738

Chayuan Town (simplified Chinese: 茶园镇; traditional Chinese: 茶園鎮; pinyin: Chayuan Zhen) is an urban town in Louxing District, Loudi City, Hunan Province, People's Republic of China.

== Administrative division ==
The town is divided into 19 villages, the following areas: Gaole Village, Shaganpu Village, Shigu Village, Xinhui Village, Shitang Village, Lizi Village, Huailiu Village, Jiannong Village, Zhimu Village, Tangqun Village, Rujiechong Village, Chunxi Village, Songshan Village, Chayuan Village, Dongchong Village, Nongqun Village, Lukou Village, Yuling Village, and Xiazhou Village (高乐村、砂干铺村、石鼓村、新辉村、石塘村、梨子村、槐柳村、建农村、志木村、塘群村、儒阶冲村、春溪村、松山村、茶园村、东冲村、农群村、路口村、鱼岭村、下洲村).
