= Shuangjiang, Loudi =

Shuangjiang Township 双江乡
- Township
- Location in Hunan.
- Coordinates: 27°53′32″N 111°59′14″E
- Country: People's Republic of China
- Province: Hunan
- Prefecture-level city: Loudi
- District: Louxing

Area
  - Total: 63 km^{2} (24 sq mi)

Population (2015)
  - Total: 17,000
  - Density: 270/km^{2} (700/sq mi)
- Time zone: UTC+8 (China Standard)
- Postal code: 417001
- Area code: 0738

Shuangjiang Township (simplified Chinese: 双江乡; traditional Chinese: 雙江鄉; pinyin: Shuāngjiāng Xiāng) is a rural township in Louxing District of Loudi City, Hunan Province, People's Republic of China. As of the 2015 census it had a population of 17,000 and an area of 63 square kilometres (24 sq mi).

== Administrative divisions ==
The township is divided into 19 villages, which include the following areas:

- Nongxin Village (农新村)
- Tanxi Village (潭溪村)
- Shuangjiang Village (双江村)
- Chayang Village (茶阳村)
- Zhujia Village (珠家村)
- Hongshan Village (洪山村)
- Xinzhuang Village (新庄村)
- Xinlian Village (新联村)
- Xinjia Village (新家村)
- Wanjia Village (万家村)
- Fangshi Village (方石村)
- Qingqiao Village (青桥村)
- Yiping Village (义坪村)
- Pingdi Village (坪底村)
- Hengshi Village (横石村)
- Xiaotian Village (小田村)
- Qishi Village (企石村)
- Jialun Village (佳仑村)
- Tianhu Village (天壶村)

== Geography ==
The township shares a border with Qixingjie Town of Lianyuan to the west, Hutian Town to the southeast, Qingshanqiao Town to the northeast, Qiaotouhe Town to the southwest, Longtian Town to the north, and Shanshan Town to the south.

The highest point in the township is Hongjia Mountain (洪家大山) on the land border of Qingshanqiao Town, which, at 876 metres (2,874 ft) above sea level.

== Transportation ==
Changsha-Shaoshan-Loudi Expressway passes across the township east to west.
