= Baimu, Loudi =

Baimu Township
- Township

Chinese transcription(s)
  - Simplified: 百亩乡
  - Traditional: 百畝鄉
  - Pinyin: Baimu Xiang
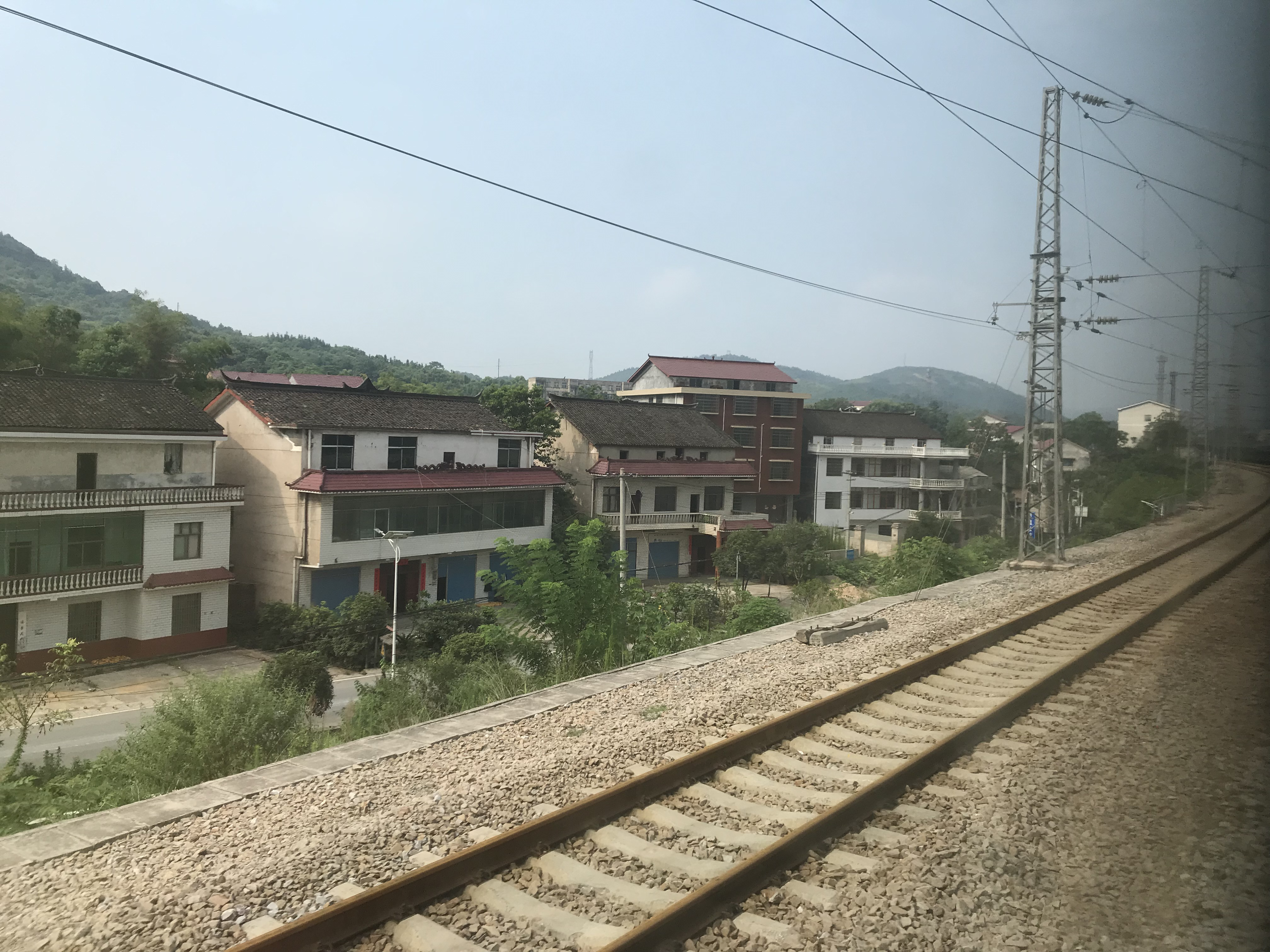

- Location in China
- Coordinates: 27°42′40″N 111°56′24″E
- Country: People's Republic of China
- Province: Hunan
- City: Loudi
- district: Louxing District

Area
  - Total: 30 km^{2} (12 sq mi)

Population
  - Total: 15,000
  - Density: 500/km^{2} (1,300/sq mi)
- Time zone: UTC+8 (China Standard)
- Postal code: 417008
- Area code: 0738

Baimu Township (simplified Chinese: 百亩乡; traditional Chinese: 百畝鄉; pinyin: Baimu Xiang) is a rural township in Louxing District, Loudi City, Hunan Province, People's Republic of China.

== Administrative division ==
The township is divided into 18 villages, the following areas: Saihui Village, Heye Village, Qibu Village, Gongrong Village, Xinjia Village, Dajing Village, Dashi Village, Shuangxiu Village, Baimu Village, Fengshu Village, Lashu Village, Yatang Village, Shipo Village, Zhalin Village, Zhaquan Village, Wutong Village, Chaoyang Village, and Wanxin Village (赛辉村、荷叶村、七步村、共荣村、新家村、大井村、大石村、双林村、百亩村、枫树村、腊树村、雅塘村、石坡村、楂林村、楂泉村、梧桐村、朝阳村、万新村).
