= Dake, Loudi =

Dake Subdistrict 大科街道
- Subdistrict
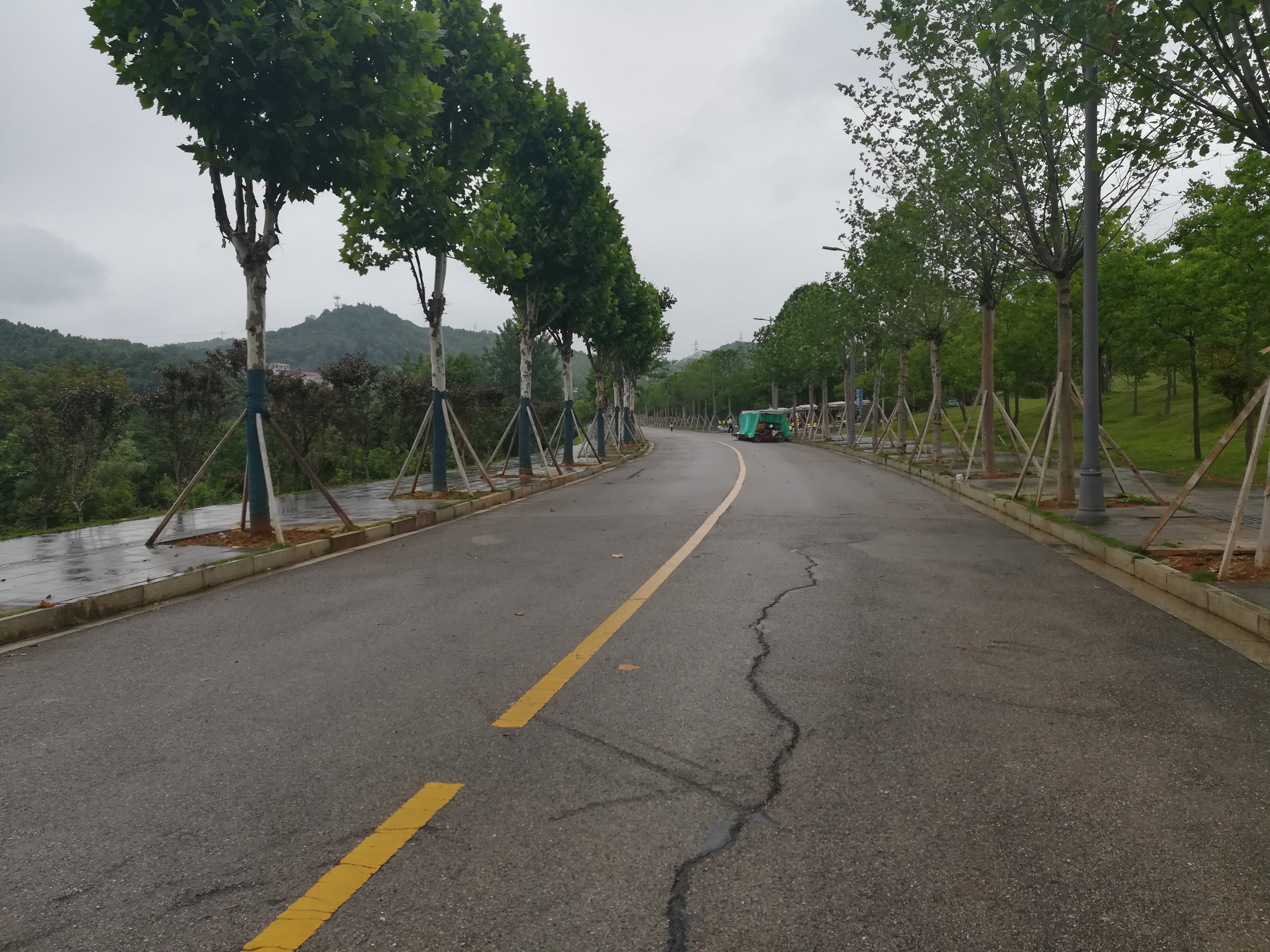
- A road passes across the Park of Sun Stream.

- Location in Hunan.
- Coordinates: 27°43′07″N 112°00′19″E
- Country: People's Republic of China
- Province: Hunan
- Prefecture-level city: Loudi
- District: Louxing District

Area
  - Total: 26.7 km^{2} (10.3 sq mi)

Population (2015)
  - Total: 25,000
  - Density: 940/km^{2} (2,400/sq mi)
- Time zone: UTC+8 (China Standard)
- Postal code: 417000
- Area code: 0738

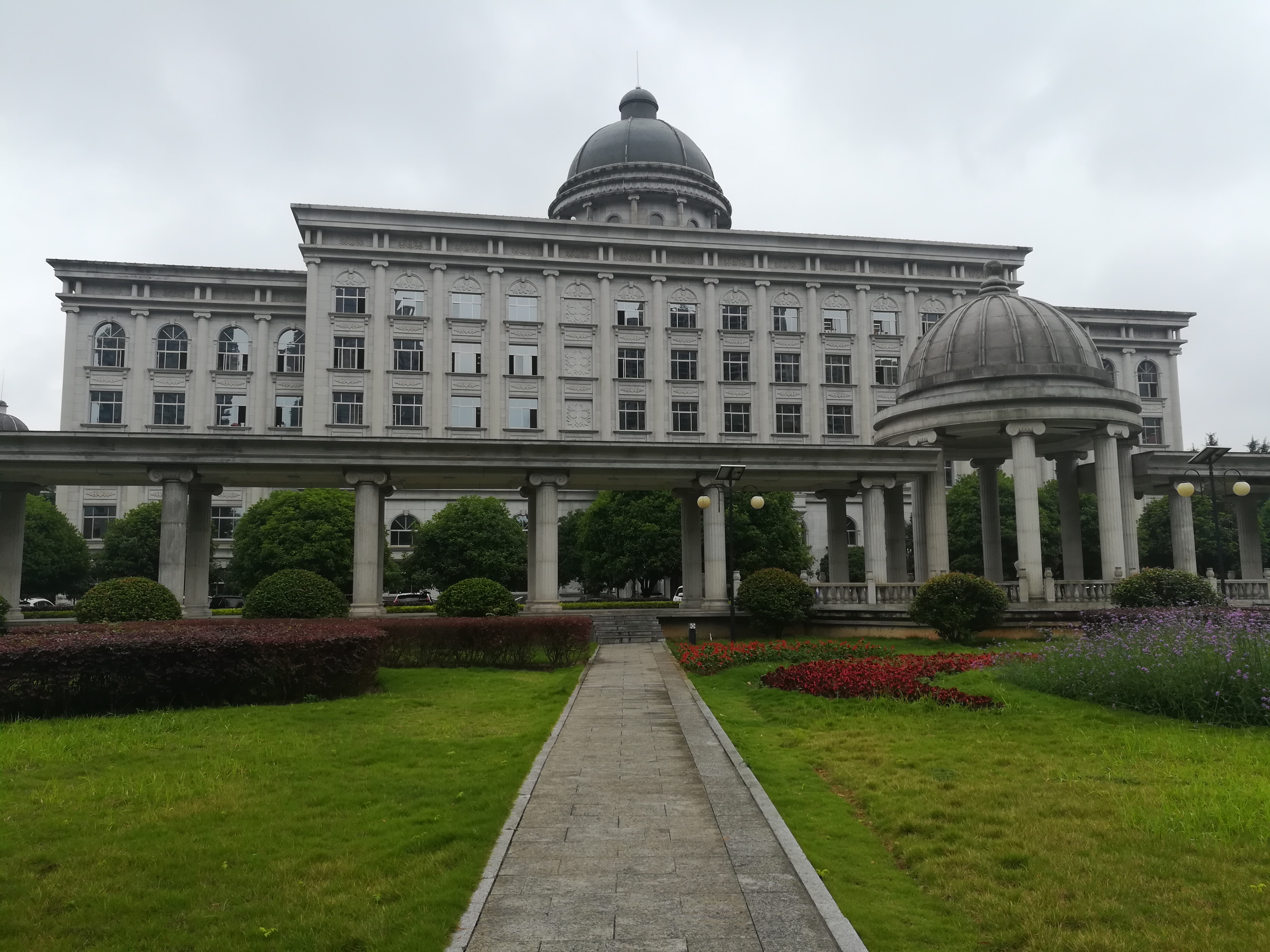
The building of Loudi Municipal People's Government.

Dake Subdistrict (Chinese: 大科街道; pinyin: Dàkē Jiēdào) is a subdistrict of Louxing District, Loudi, Hunan Province, People's Republic of China. The building of Loudi Municipal Government lies in the subdistrict.

== Administrative divisions ==
The subdistrict is divided into 5 villages and 10 community, which include the following areas:

- Dake Community (大科社区)
- Xiaoke Community (小科社区)
- Luojia Community (罗家社区)
- Huangni Community (黄泥社区)
- Jingtou Community (井头社区)
- Dawu Community (大屋社区)
- Nanlong Community (南垅社区)
- Daxin Community (大新社区)
- Zaoyuan Community (早元社区)
- Sanyuan Community (三元社区)
- Shuiyang Village (水洋村)
- Futan Village (福潭村)
- Pingshi Village (坪石村)
- Fangshi Village (方石村)
- Sile Village (思乐村)

== Geography ==
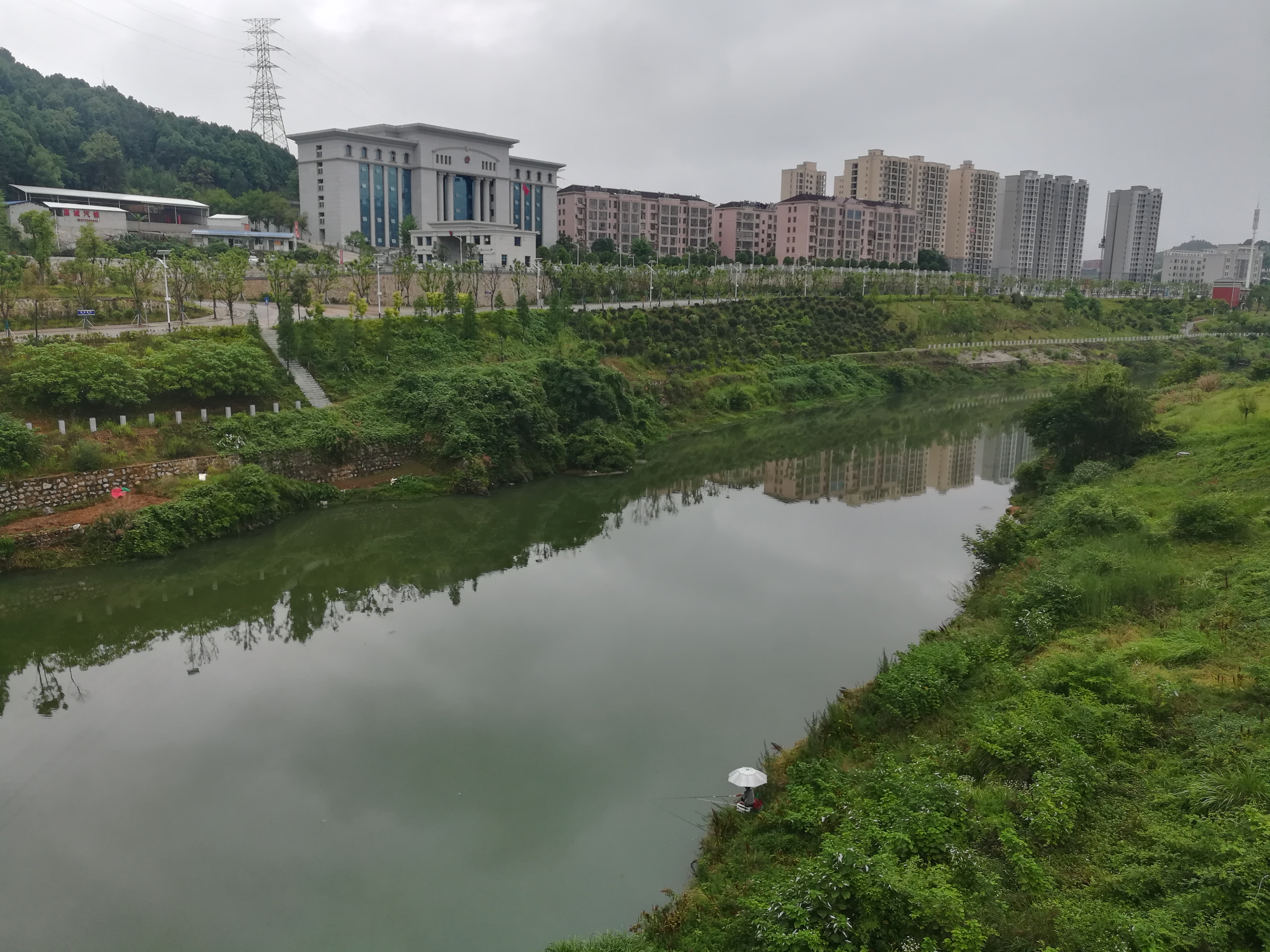
The Sun Stream flows through the subdistrict.

The Sun Stream (孙水), a tributary of Lishui River, flows through the subdistrict.

== Economy ==
The local economy is primarily based upon commerce and local industry.

== Transportation ==
Loudi West railway station and Loudi South Bus station serve the town.

=== Railway ===
The Luoyang–Zhanjiang Railway, from Luoyang City, Henan Province to Zhanjiang City, Guangdong Province runs through the subdistrict.

The Shanghai–Kunming railway, more commonly known as "Hukun railway", is a west-east railway passing through the subdistrict.

== Attractions ==
The Park of Sun Stream (孙水公园) is a public park within the subdistrict.
