= Dabuqiao =

Dabuqiao Subdistrict 大埠桥街道
- Subdistrict
- Location in Hunan.
- Coordinates: 27°46′22″N 112°04′52″E
- Country: People's Republic of China
- Province: Hunan
- Prefecture-level city: Loudi
- District: Louxing

Area
  - Total: 58.28 km^{2} (22.50 sq mi)

Population (2015)
  - Total: 27,734
  - Density: 475.9/km^{2} (1,233/sq mi)
- Time zone: UTC+8 (China Standard)
- Postal code: 417000
- Area code: 0738
- Website: www.dbqbsc.com

Dabuqiao Subdistrict (simplified Chinese: 大埠桥街道; traditional Chinese: 大埠橋街道; pinyin: Dàbùqiáo Jiēdào) is a subdistrict in Louxing District of Loudi City, Hunan Province, People's Republic of China.

== Administrative divisions ==
The subdistrict is divided into 25 villages and 1 community, which include the following areas:

- Nanshi Community (南石居委会)
- Longhu Village (龙虎村)
- Minfeng Village (民丰村)
- Xinshi Village (新石村)
- Xingming Village (星明村)
- Songjia Village (宋家村)
- Zhongyang Village (中阳村)
- Shangyuan Village (上元村)
- Shengxi Village (胜昔村)
- Huashi Village (华实村)
- Dabu Village (大埠村)
- Xiyang Village (西阳村)
- Nanyang Village (南阳村)
- Shikou Village (石口村)
- Hejia Village (和家村)
- Litou Village (犁头村)
- Shihua Village (石花村)
- Bailu Village (白露村)
- Jianglong Village (江龙村)
- Quanfeng Village (泉丰村村)
- Yongxing Village (永兴村)
- Gaoshan Village (高山村)
- Zhongshi Village (忠实村)
- Gaoqiao Village (高桥村)
- Shuangchong Village (双冲村)
- Shima Village (石马村)

== Geography ==
The subdistrict is bordered to the east by Gushui Township of Xiangxiang, to the south by Maotian Town of Xiangxiang, and to the west by Dake Subdistrict.

Lishui River, also known as the mother river, flows through the subdistrict. Sun Stream (孙水), a tributary of Lianshui River, passes through the subdistrict. Xiyang Stream (西阳河) flows through the subdistrict.

== Economy ==
The local economy is primarily based upon agriculture, commerce and local industry.

== Education ==
- Chunyuan Middle School (春元中学)
- Tao Kan School (陶龛学校)

== Transportation ==
=== Railways ===
Shanghai–Kunming high-speed railway, more commonly known as "Hukun high-speed railway", passing through the subdistrict.

Luoyang–Zhanjiang Railway, commonly abbreviated as "Luozhan railway", from Luoyang City, Henan Province to Zhanjiang City, Guangdong Province runs through the subdistrict north to south.

Hunan–Guizhou railway, commonly referred to as "Xiangqin railway", is an east-west highway passing through the subdistrict.

Xi'en railway (西恩铁路) travels through the northwest part of the subdistrict.

=== Expressway ===
Yiyang-Loudi-Hengyang Expressway passes across the subdistrict.

=== Roads ===
There are four roads run through the subdistrict, namely Louxiang Road (娄湘公路), Loulian Road (娄涟公路), East Ring Road, Shanxi Road (杉西公路).
