= Huangnitang, Loudi =

Huangnitang Subdistrict 黄泥塘街道
- Subdistrict
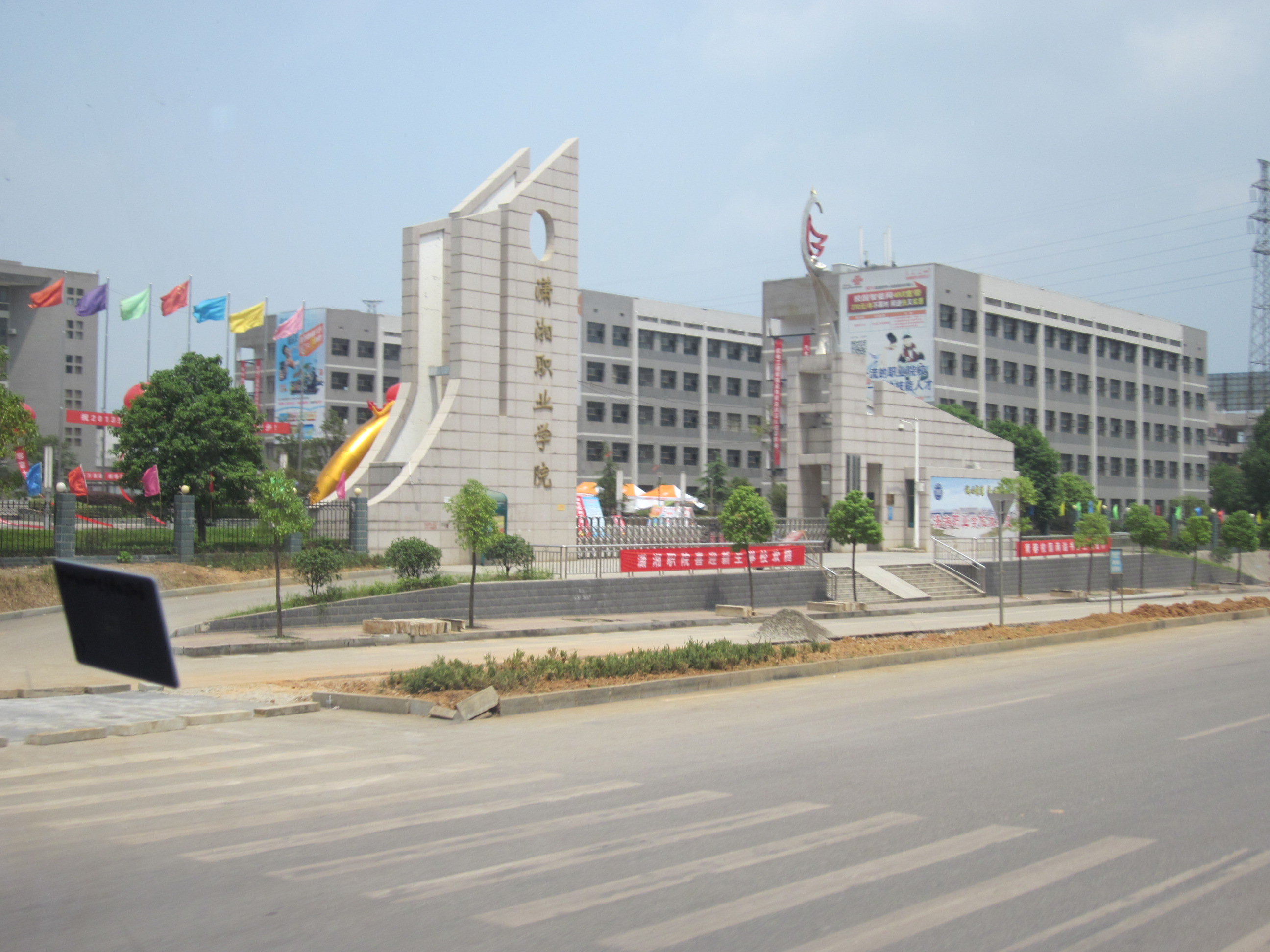
- Xiaoxiang Vocational College.

- Location in Hunan.
- Coordinates: 27°45′36″N 111°59′10″E
- Country: People's Republic of China
- Province: Hunan
- Prefecture-level city: Loudi
- District: Louxing

Area
  - Total: 18 km^{2} (6.9 sq mi)

Population (2015)
  - Total: 74,000
  - Density: 4,100/km^{2} (11,000/sq mi)
- Time zone: UTC+8 (China Standard)
- Postal code: 417000
- Area code: 0738

Huangnitang Subdistrict (simplified Chinese: 黄泥塘街道; traditional Chinese: 黃泥塘街道; pinyin: Huángnítáng Jiēdào) is a subdistrict in Louxing District of Loudi City, Hunan Province, People's Republic of China.

== Administrative divisions ==
The subdistrict is divided into 5 villages and 14 communities, which include the following areas:

- Xinli Community (新立社区)
- Fuling Community (福岭社区)
- Shuangyuan Community (双园社区)
- Shichang Community (市场社区)
- Fengyang Community (凤阳社区)
- Gaoxi Community (高溪社区)
- Hongjiazhou Community (洪家洲社区)
- Tanjiashan Community (谭家山社区)
- Suoqiao Community (索桥社区)
- Huamiaochong Community (花庙冲社区)
- Chaoyang Community (朝阳社区)
- Gongyuan Community (公园社区)
- Pangshanchong Community (旁山冲社区)
- Bixi Community (碧溪社区)
- Nanyang Village (南阳村)
- Enkou Village (恩口村)
- Donglai Village (东来村)
- Caojia Village (曹家村)
- Lianbin Village (涟滨村)

== Geography ==
Lianshui River flows through the subdistrict.

== Economy ==
The economy is supported primarily by commerce and local industry.

== Education ==
Xiaoxiang Vocational College (潇湘职业学院) is a vocational college sits in the subdistrict.

== Hospital ==
Loudi No. 1 Renmin Hospital is situated at the subdistrict.

== Transportation ==
=== Railway ===
A railway heads to Qixingjie Town of Lianyuan.

=== Roads ===
The subdistrict is connected to three roads and streets: Loulian High-Grade Highway, Louxing North Street and Xinxing Road.

== Attractions ==
Greet Mountain Park (青山公园) is located within the subdistrict limits and has boating, walking and sporting events.
