= Huashan, Loudi =

Huashan Subdistrict 花山街道
- Subdistrict
- Location in Hunan.
- Coordinates: 27°44′36″N 111°59′26″E
- Country: People's Republic of China
- Province: Hunan
- Prefecture-level city: Loudi
- district: Louxing District

Area
  - Total: 4.6 km^{2} (1.8 sq mi)

Population (2015)
  - Total: 40,000
  - Density: 8,700/km^{2} (23,000/sq mi)
- Time zone: UTC+8 (China Standard)
- Postal code: 417000
- Area code: 0738

Huashan Subdistrict (Chinese: 花山街道; pinyin: Huāshān Jiēdào) is a subdistrict in Louxing District of Loudi City, Hunan Province, People's Republic of China.

== Administrative divisions ==
The subdistrict is divided into 10 communities, which include the following areas:

- Tiedong Community (铁东社区)
- Tiexi Community (铁西社区)
- Shentongwan Community (神童湾社区)
- Daqiao Community (大桥社区)
- Huashan Community (花山社区)
- Qingtan Community (清潭社区)
- Shantang Community (山塘社区)
- Sitang Community (思塘社区)
- Guanhua Community (观化社区)
- Duijiang Community (对江社区)

== Geography ==
Lianshui River flows through the subdistrict.

== Economy ==
The local economy is primarily based upon commerce and local industry.

== Hospital ==
Loudi No. 2 Hospital is situated at the subdistrict.

== Transportation ==
=== Railway ===
The Luoyang–Zhanjiang Railway, from Luoyang City, Henan Province to Zhanjiang City, Guangdong Province runs through the subdistrict.

The Shanghai–Kunming railway, more commonly known as "Hukun railway", is a west–east railway passing through the subdistrict.

=== Road ===
Lianbin Street passes across the subdistrict west to east. And Louxing South Road runs through the subdistrict north to south.
