= Hongshandian =

Hongshandian Town 洪山殿镇
- Town
- Location in Hunan
- Coordinates: 27°34′25″N 112°00′57″E
- Country: People's Republic of China
- Province: Hunan
- Prefecture-level city: Loudi
- County: Shuangfeng

Area
  - Total: 63.78 km^{2} (24.63 sq mi)

Population
  - Total: 53,475
  - Density: 838.4/km^{2} (2,172/sq mi)
- Time zone: UTC+8 (China Standard)
- Postal code: 417721
- Area code: 0738

Hongshandian (Chinese: 洪山殿镇; pinyin: Hóngshāndiàn Zhèn) is a town of Shuangfeng County in Hunan, China. It has an area of 55.29 km^{2} (21.35 sq mi) with a population of 49,000 (as of 2017). The town has 22 villages and 3 communities under its jurisdiction.

== History ==
Two villages of Zimu (Chinese: 梓木村) and Gutang (Chinese: 古塘村) were transferred to Shexingshan Town in January 2017.

== Administrative divisions ==
The town is divided into 41 villages and 3 communities, which include the following areas: Zhongxin Community, Taipingsi Community, Liyutang Community, Gutang Village, Zimu Village, Qiantang Village, Yangliu Village, Sifang Village, Xinzhong Village, Guanchong Village, Lashu Village, Fuchong Village, Shuangqiao Village, Qingjing Village, Zhazi Village, Nanxi Village, Jianxin Village, Pianyu Village, Xiaoduan Village, Qiantang Village, Lixin Village, Songmu Village, Xinbian Village, Xianjia Village, Xinhu Village, Xianxin Village, Guiling Village, Xintang Village, Yajiaping Village, Daqi Village, Juhua Village, Yanglin Village, Yongzhong Village, Aotou Village, Youpu Village, Zhoushang Village, Gaoqiao Village, Yonghong Village, Panjin Village, Taiping Village, Taihe Village, Gongyi Village, Xintan Village, and Tanmu Village (中心社区、太平寺社区、鲤鱼塘社区、古塘村、梓木村、堑塘村、杨柳村、四方村、新中村、观冲村、腊树村、扶冲村、双桥村、清靖村、柞子村、南溪村、建新村、片玉村、小段村、前塘村、栗新村、松木村、新边村、咸加村、新湖村、咸新村、龟灵村、新塘村、亚家坪村、大旗村、菊花村、杨林村、永忠村、熬头村、油铺村、洲上村、高桥村、永红村、盘金村、太平村、太和村、公益村、新檀村、檀木村).
