= Xiaobi, Loudi =

Xiaobi Township
- Township

Chinese transcription(s)
  - Simplified: 小碧乡
  - Traditional: 小碧鄉
  - Pinyin: Xiaobi Xiang
- Location in China
- Coordinates: 27°50′52″N 111°59′02″E
- Country: People's Republic of China
- Province: Hunan
- City: Loudi
- district: Louxing District

Area
  - Total: 33.4 km^{2} (12.9 sq mi)

Population
  - Total: 14,000
  - Density: 420/km^{2} (1,100/sq mi)
- Time zone: UTC+8 (China Standard)
- Postal code: 417002
- Area code: 0738

Xiaobi Township (simplified Chinese: 小碧乡; traditional Chinese: 小碧鄉; pinyin: Xiaobi Xiang) is a rural township in Louxing District, Loudi City, Hunan Province, People's Republic of China.

== Administrative divisions ==
The township is divided into 17 villages, which include the following areas: Zhennan Village, Qinglian Village, Jianxin Village, Jihe Village, Tongzi Village, Tong'an Village, Tongfu Village, Shizi Village, Duijia Village, Lichong Village, Lutang Village, Xiaobi Village, Riyan Village, Gaoping Village, Shuanglian Village, Nonglian Village, and Qingquan Village (镇南村、青联村、建新村、集和村、桐梓村、同安村、同福村、十字村、对家村、栗冲村、炉塘村、小碧村、日岩村、高坪村、双联村、农联村、青泉村).
