= Shima Park =

Public park in Loudi, Hunan, China

- 石马公园
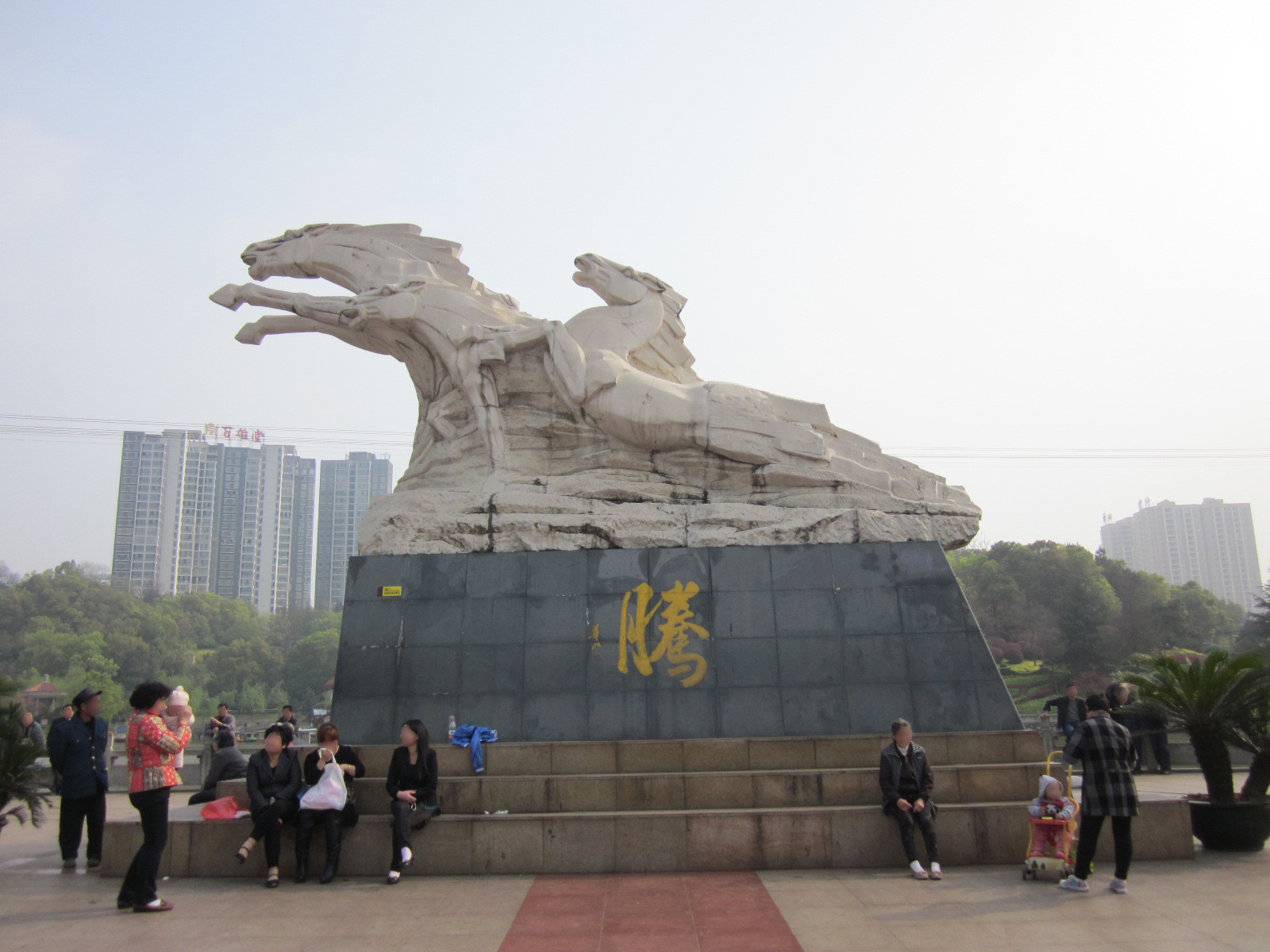
- A stone horse statue in Shima Park.

- Location within Hunan
- Type: Public park, urban park
- Location: Louxing District, Loudi, Hunan
- Coordinates: 27°44′31″N 112°01′09″E
- Area: 225,000-square-metre (2,420,000 sq ft)
- Created: 1999
- Operator: Loudi Municipal Government
- Status: Open all year

Shima Park (simplified Chinese: 石马公园; traditional Chinese: 石馬公園; pinyin: Shímǎ Gōngyuán; lit. 'Stone Horse Park') is a public urban park in Loudi, Hunan, China. It covers an area of 225,000 square metres (2,420,000 sq ft). Located in Louxing District, Shima Park is bordered by Xiangyin West Street on the South, Xiushi Street on the West, Yuetang Street on the North, and Xinxing Middle Road on the East. It is a renowned botanical garden and scenic spot integrating scientific research & popularization and tourism in Hunan. It is adjacent to the Loudi railway station.

== Tourist attractions ==
- Yuma Lake (御马湖; 'Horse Riding Lake')
- Shima Pavilion (石马阁; 'Stone Horse Pavilion')
- Relief Wall (浮雕屏风墙)

== Natural history ==
There are more than 20 plant species cultivated in this park, including Cinnamomum camphora, Cupressus lusitanica, Magnolia grandiflora, willow, Magnolia denudata, Osmanthus fragrans, Metasequoia glyptostroboides, peach, Acer rubrum, Pinus massoniana, Rhododendron simsii, and Phyllostachys edulis.

== Public access ==
In 1999, Shima Park was officially opened to the public.

== Gallery ==
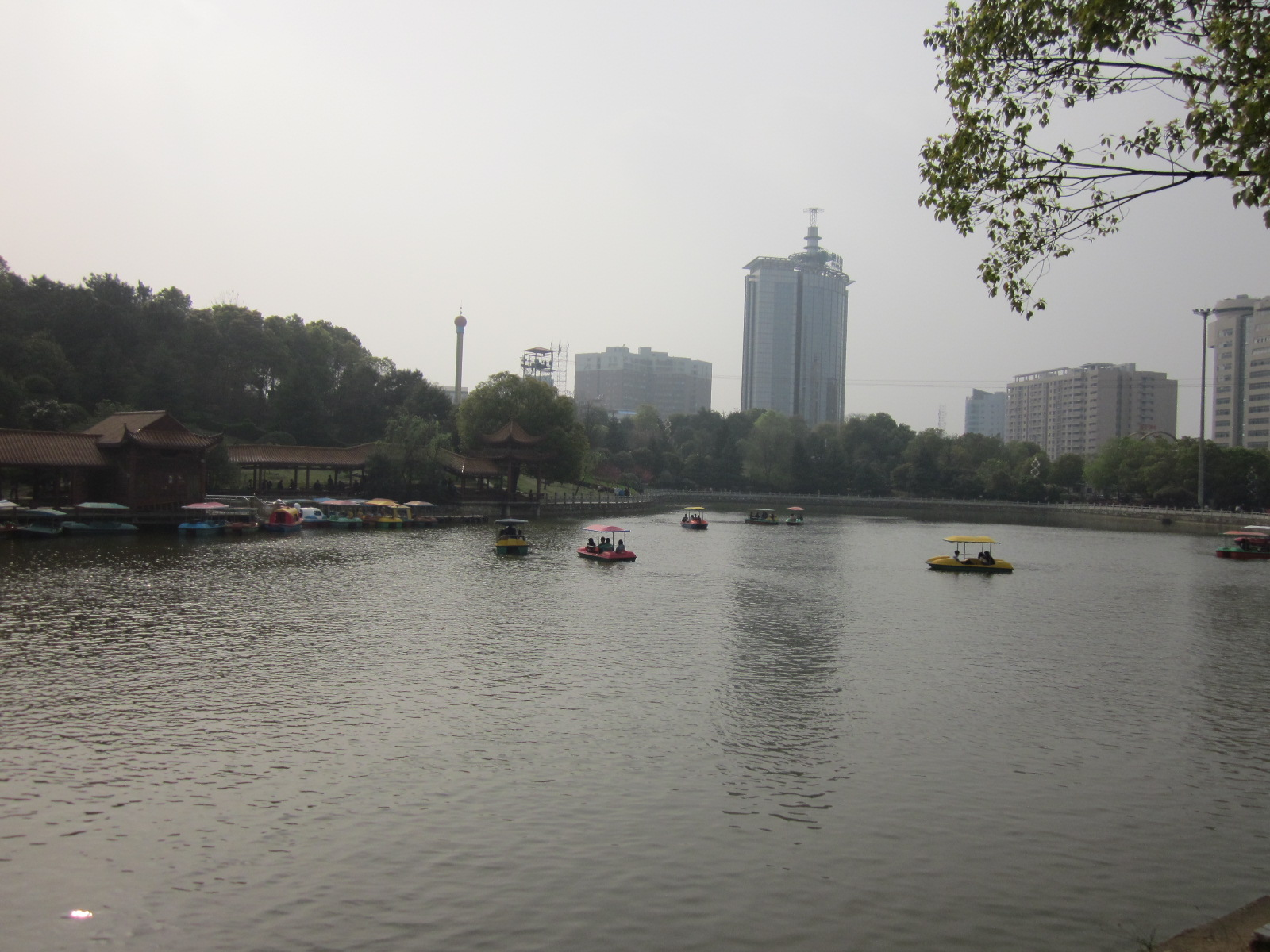
The Yuma Lake in Shima Park.

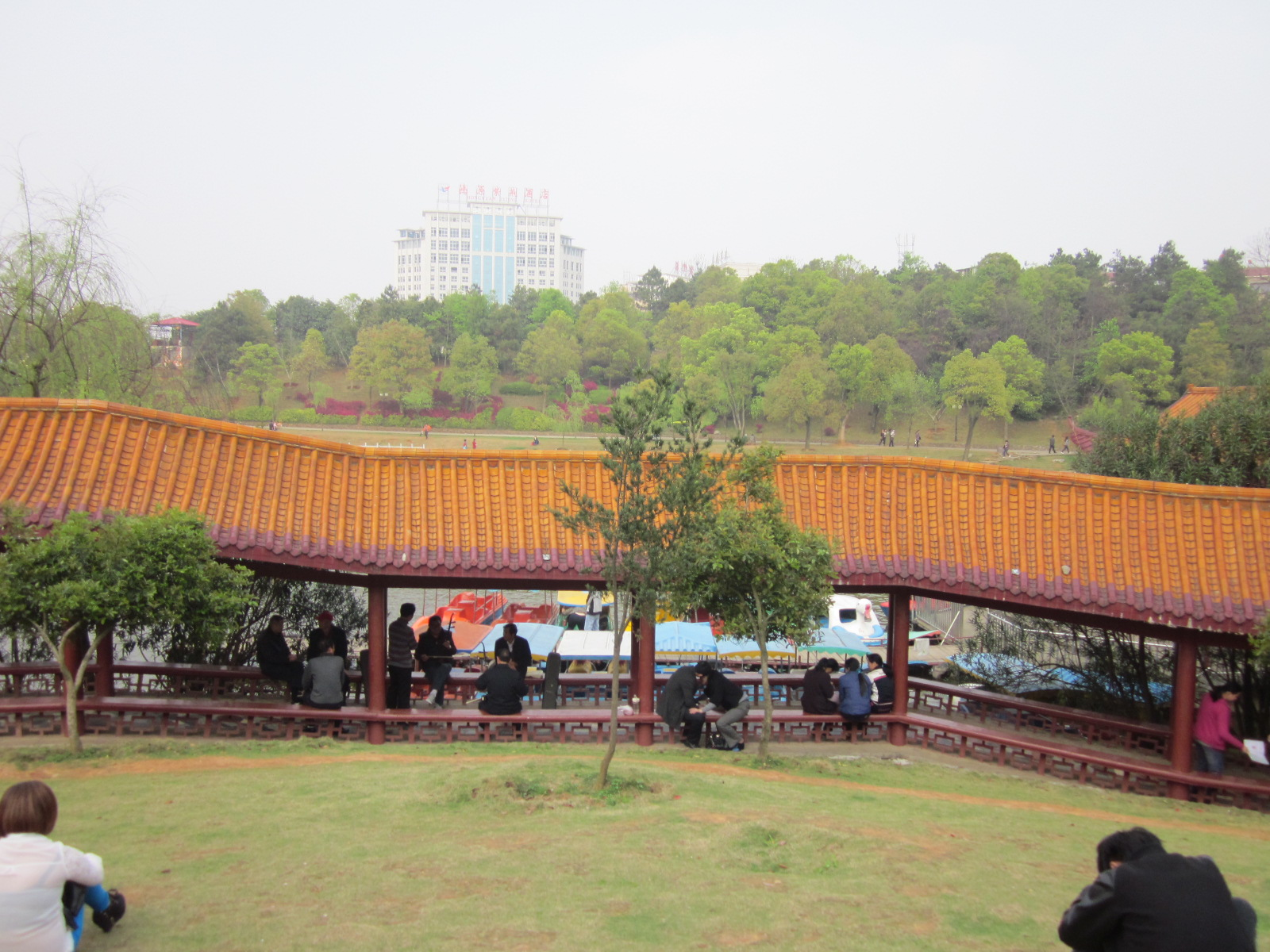
A corridor near the Yuma Lake.

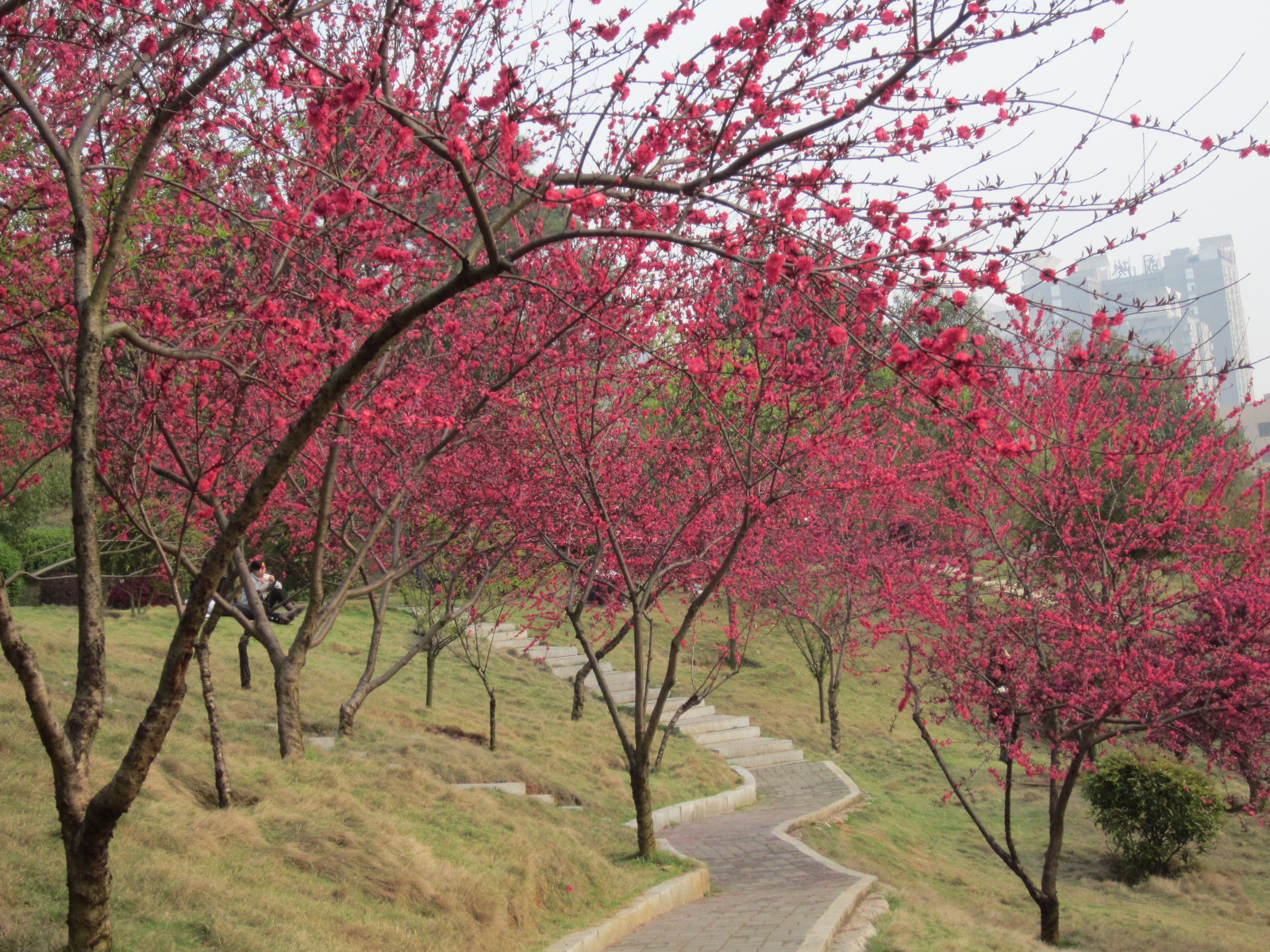
Peach blossom.

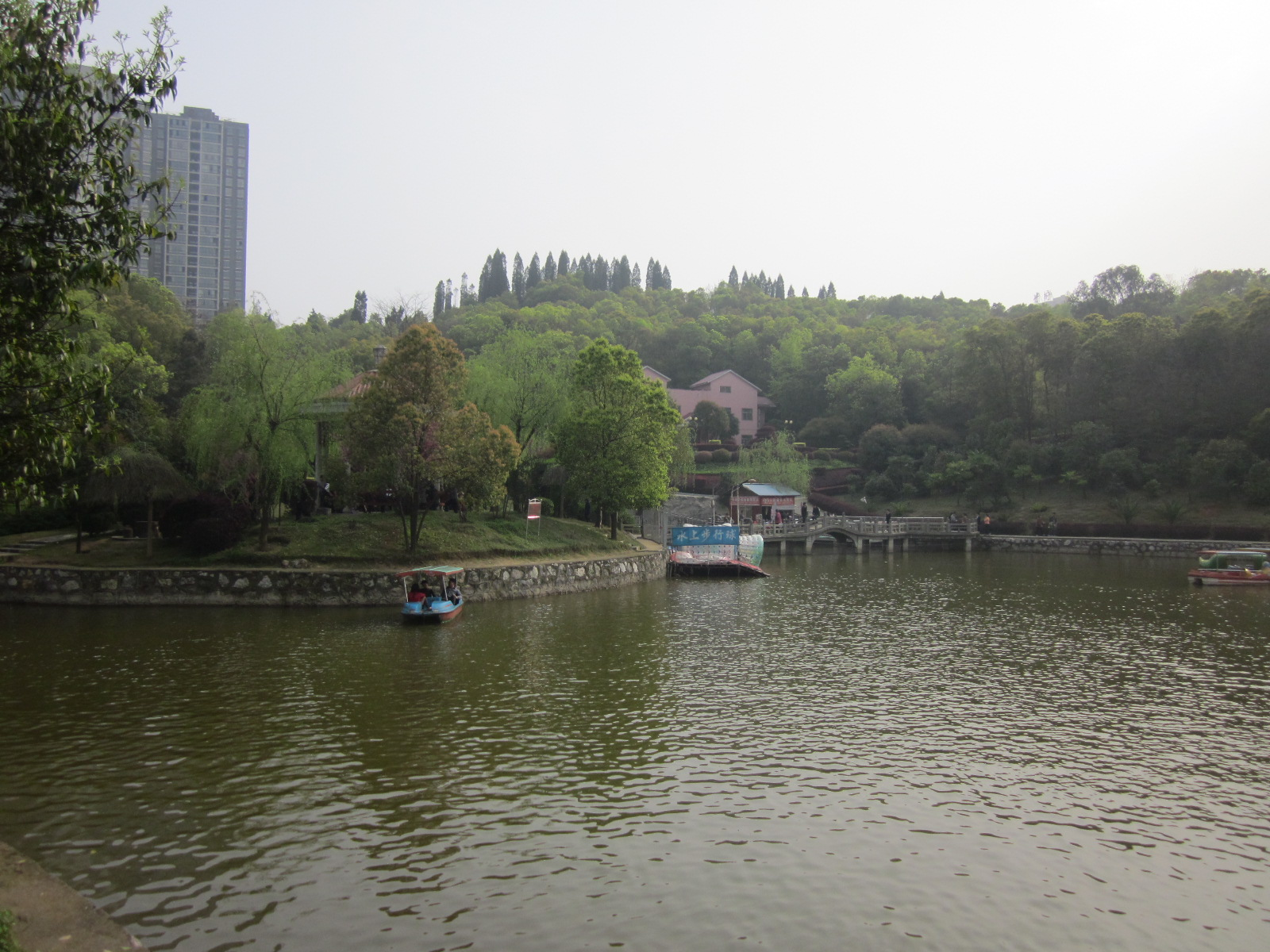
A distant view of Shimalun Hill (石马仑).

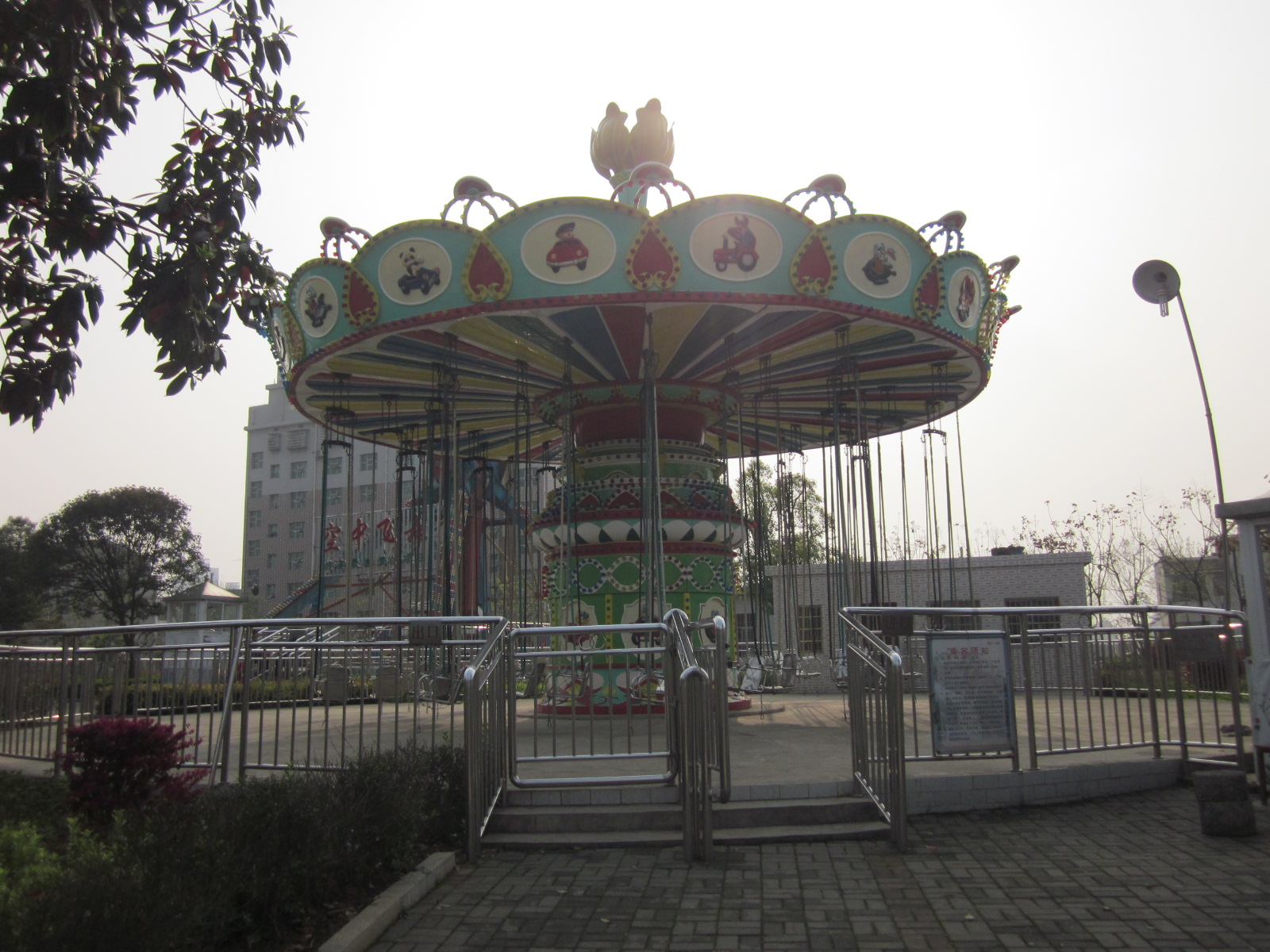
A carousel in Shima Park.

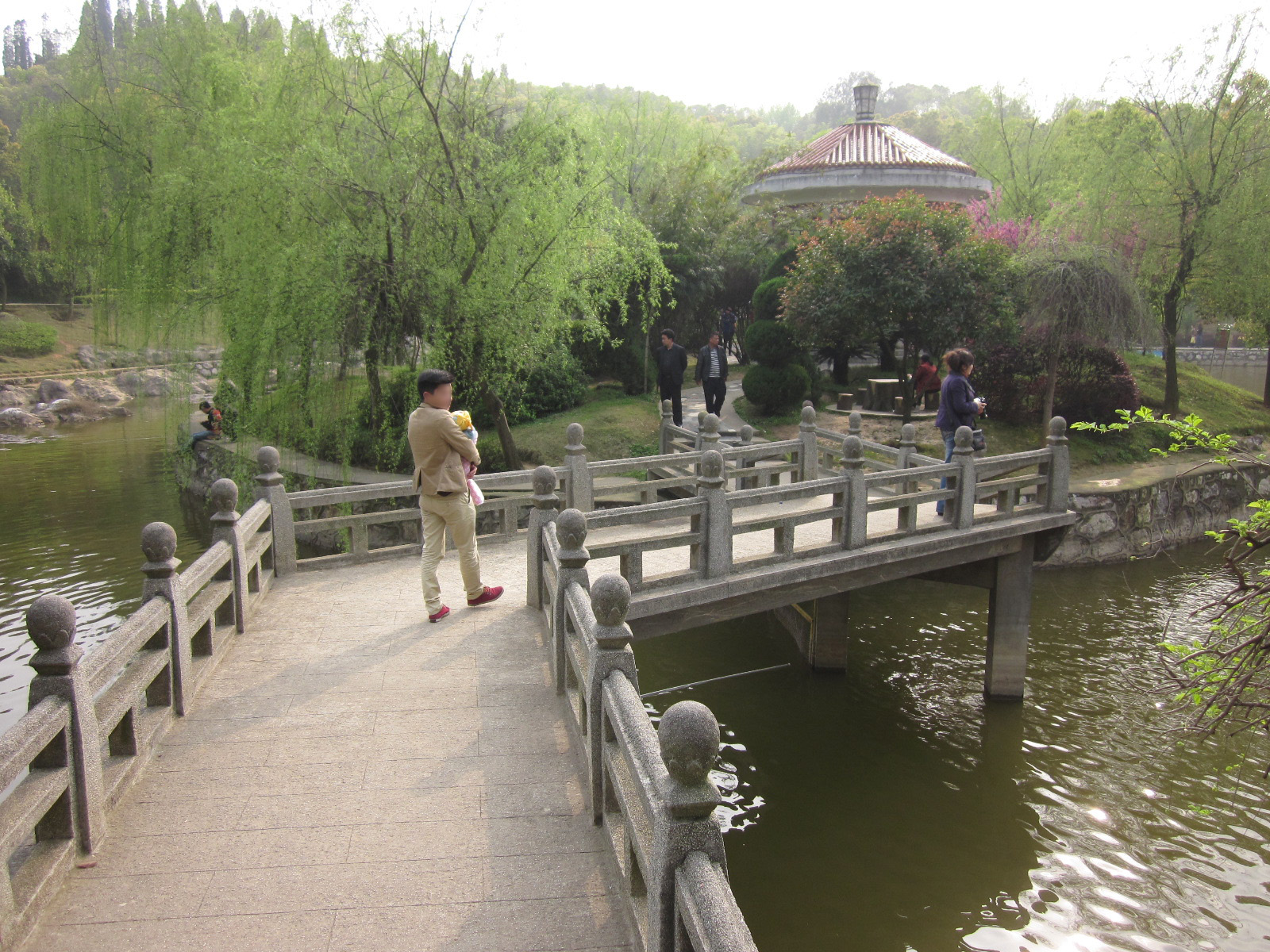
Willows near Yuma Lake.
