= Gensi Township =

Gensi Township 根思乡
- Township
- Location in Jiangsu
- Coordinates: 32°15′9″N 120°0′40″E
- Country: People's Republic of China
- Province: Jiangsu
- Prefecture-level city: Taizhou
- County-level city: Taixing
- Named for: Yang Gensi
- Time zone: UTC+8 (China Standard)

Gensi Township (simplified Chinese: 根思乡; traditional Chinese: 根思鄉; pinyin: Gēnsī Xiāng) is a township under the administration of Taixing, Jiangsu, China. As of 2020, it administers the following ten villages:

Gensi Village

- Laoye Village (老叶村)
- Jugu Village (鞠顾村)
- Nanhu Village (南湖村)
- Jingdi Village (井坔村)
- Lixiuhe Village (李秀河村)
- Shuanggang Village (双港村)
- Shuanglian Village (双联村)
- Xingang Village (新港村)
- Xingxu Village (兴许村)
