= Lianshui River =

River in Hunan, China

Coordinates: 27°48′13″N 112°52′57″E

The Lianshui River (Chinese: 涟水 or 涟水河), also known as Luoma River (Chinese: 骆马江) or Ganxi River (Chinese: 甘溪), is a left-bank tributary in the middle reaches of the Xiang River in Hunan. The river rises in Pingshang Town (Chinese: 坪上镇) of Xinshao County. Its main stream runs generally west to east through Xinshao, Lianyuan, Louxing, Shuangfeng, Xiangxiang, Yuhu and Xiangtan counties and joins the Xiang at Hekou of Xiangtan. The Lianshui River has a length of 224 kilometres (139 mi); its drainage basin covers an area of 7,150 square kilometres (2,760 sq mi).
