= Louxing, Loudi =

Louxing 娄星区
- District
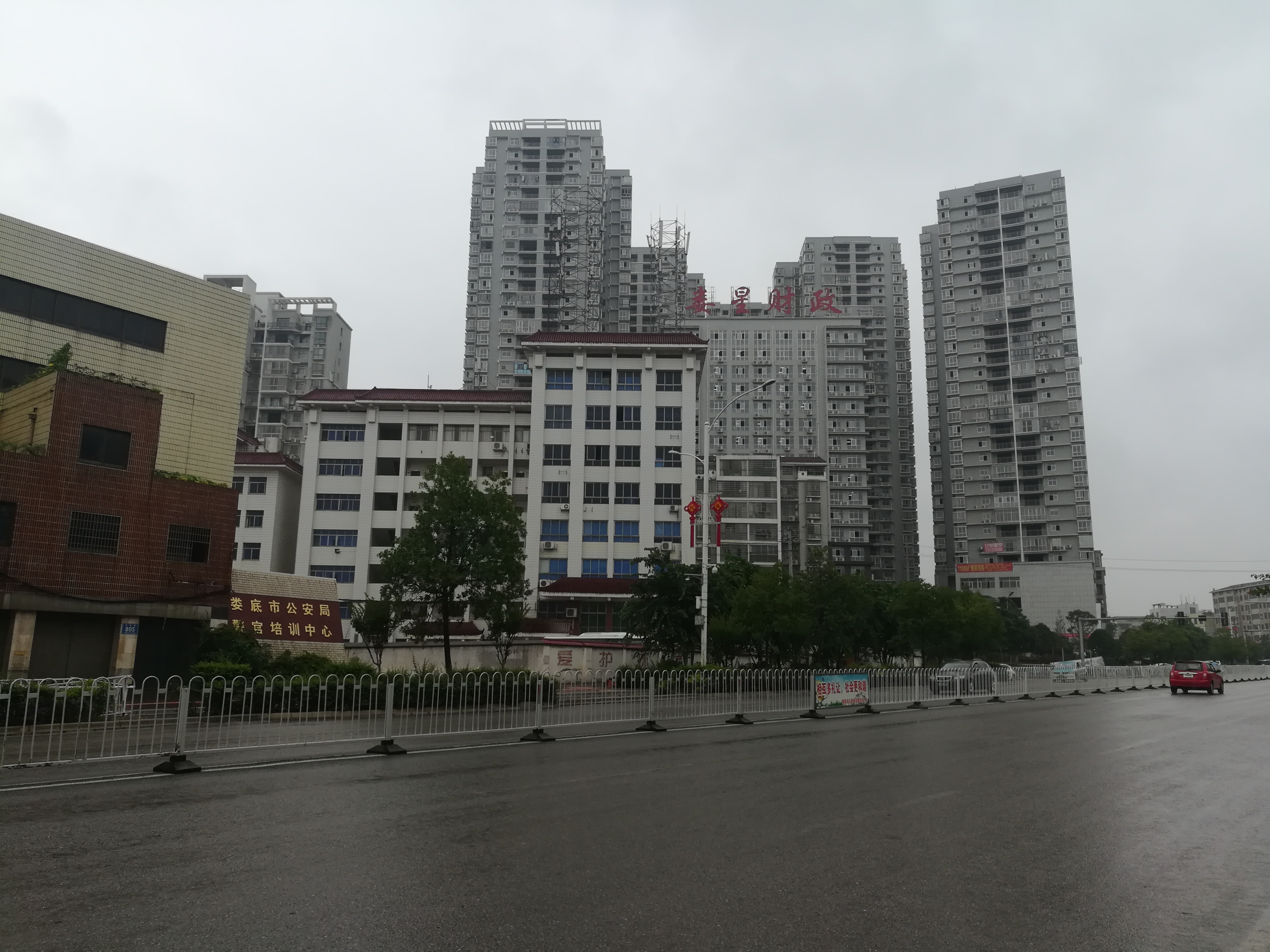

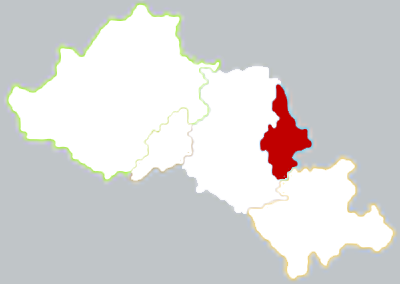
- Location of Louxing District within Loudi

- Location in Hunan
- Coordinates: 27°43′39″N 112°00′17″E
- Country: China
- Province: Hunan
- Prefecture-level city: Loudi
- District seat: Changqing Subdistrict

Area
  - Total: 630.02 km^{2} (243.25 sq mi)

Population (2020 census)
  - Total: 752,530
  - Density: 1,194.5/km^{2} (3,093.6/sq mi)
- Time zone: UTC+8 (China Standard)
- Website: www.louxing.gov.cn

Louxing District (simplified Chinese: 娄星区; traditional Chinese: 婁星區; pinyin: Lóuxīng Qū) is the only urban district and the seat of Loudi prefecture-level city, Hunan Province, China.

Located in northeastern part of Loudi, it is in the place across three prefecturel-level cities of Loudi, Changsha and Xiangtan, and the Lian River flows it west to east. Louxing District is bordered to the west by Ningxiang County, to the east by Xiangxiang City, to the southeast by Shuangfeng County, and to the southwest and the west by Lianyuan City. The district covers an area of 630.02 km^{2} (243.25 sq mi) with a population of 668,300 (as of 2017). Louxing District has seven subdistricts, five towns and a township under its jurisdiction. The government seat is Louxing Community (娄星社区) of Changqing Subdistrict.

== History ==
From Song dynasty to Ming dynasty, the place of modern district of Louxing was a part of Chang'an Town (Chinese: 常安乡) in Xiangxiang County. The township of Chang'an was divided into two townships of Chang'an and Shentong (Chinese: 神童乡) in 1896. The township of Shentong was reorganized to Shentong Town in 1912 (Chinese: 神童镇). Xiangxiang was divided into ten districts in 1930, the modern district of Louxing was a part of the 9th district. Through the adjustment and amalgamation of subdivisions of Xiangxiang County in 1934, there were four townships of Fengle (Chinese: 丰乐乡), Yunxia (Chinese: 云下乡), Leshan (Chinese: 乐善乡) and Yanfu (Chinese: 延福乡) in the region of modern Louxing. There were four townships of Fengle, Yunxia, Leshan and Yanfu, and the town of Loudi (Chinese: 娄底镇) in the region of modern Louxing in 1949.

The district of Louxing is originally the county-level city of Loudi was formed by seven communes from Lianyuan County (the modern Lianyuan City) in January 1961, which was under the administration of Shaoyang Prefecture (Chinese: 邵阳专区). The county-level city of Loudi ceased to be a separate city and was merged with Lianyuan in October 1962.

Lianyuan Prefecture (Chinese: 涟源地区) was formed from part of Shaoyang Prefecture in September 1977, its seat was Loudi Town (Chinese: 娄底镇) in Lianyuan County. The county-level city of Loudi was reformed and was the seat of Lianyuan Prefecture in July 1980. Lianyuan Prefecture was renamed to Loudi Prefecture (Chinese: 娄底地区) named after its seat in December 1982. The Loudi Prefecture ceased to be as a prefecture, it was replaced by the prefecture-level city of Loudi, meanwhile the county-level city of Loudi was renamed to Louxing District on January 20, 1999.

Shuidongdi Town from Lianyuan City and Shexingshan Town from Shuangfeng County were transferred to Louxing District on January 24, 2017. The district of Louxing covers an area of 630.02 km^{2} (243.25 sq mi) with a population of 668,300 (as of 2017). It has 16 towns, five townships and seven subdistricts under jurisdiction.

== Subdivisions ==
Shuidongdi Town from Lianyuan City and Shexingshan Town from Shuangfeng County were transferred to Louxing District on January 24, 2017. It has five towns, one township and seven subdistricts under jurisdiction.

7 subdistricts

- Changqing (长青街道)
- Dabuqiao (大埠桥街道)
- Dake (大科街道)
- Huangnitang (黄泥塘街道)
- Huashan (花山街道)
- Leping (乐坪街道)
- Lianbin (涟滨街道)

5 towns

- Shanshan (杉山镇)
- Shexingshan (蛇形山)
- Shijing (石井镇)
- Shuidongdi (水洞底)
- Wanbao (万宝镇)

a township

- Shuangjiang (双江乡)

== Tourist attraction ==
Shima Park a renowned botanical garden and scenic spot integrating scientific research & popularization and tourism in Louxing District.
