= Fanjiang, Xiangxiang =

Fanjiang Town 翻江镇
- Town
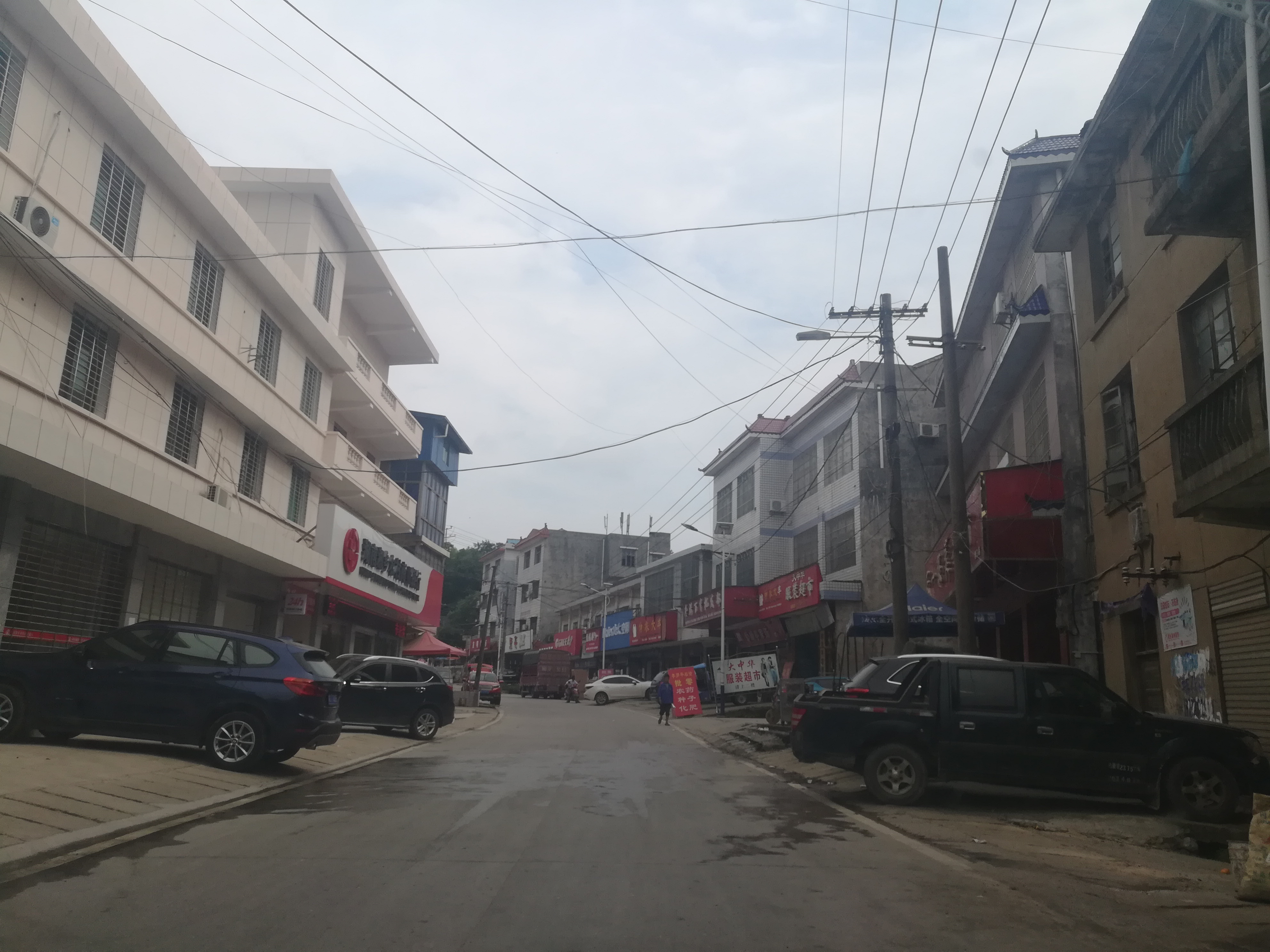
- Residential buildings in Fanjiang Town.

- Location in Hunan
- Coordinates: 27°50′04″N 112°10′38″E
- Country: People's Republic of China
- Province: Hunan
- Prefecture-level city: Xiangtan
- County-level city: Xiangxiang

Area
  - Total: 133.39 km^{2} (51.50 sq mi)

Population
  - Total: 42,880
  - Density: 321.5/km^{2} (832.6/sq mi)
- Time zone: UTC+8 (China Standard)
- Postal code: 411400
- Area code: 0732

Fanjiang Town (simplified Chinese: 翻江镇; traditional Chinese: 翻江鎮; pinyin: Fānjiāng Zhèn) is a rural town in Xiangxiang City, Hunan Province, People's Republic of China.

== Administrative divisions ==
The town is divided into 47 villages and two communities, which include the following areas: Yangjiawan Community, Zengjiashan Community, Changping Village, Hengxi Village, Nonglin Village, Ronglin Village, Yintang Village, Jingu Village, Gutang Village, Taolin Village, Niaolin Village, Hongjiachong Village, Qilichong Village, Fanjiang Village, Dougang Village, Yanghe Village, Gaoping Village, Gaoqiao Village, Nanzheng Village, Jichang Village, Jidong Village, Dale Village, Wuling Village, Xinxiong Village, Bigao Village, Dingjia Village, Huangtang Village, Liuwan Village, Fengshan Village, Guiyuan Village, Changgang Village, Jiangjia'ao Village, Bajiaqiao Village, Linzhang Village, Xiangdong Village, Tiema Village, Chabei Village, Dongping Village, Zhongshan Village, Qishan Village, Tangping Village, Fujia Village, Shilu Village, Yuanyichang Village, Yuanliang Village, Hongmen Village, Rongxi Village, Ceshan Village, and Wawu Village (杨家湾社区、曾家山社区、昌坪村、横溪村、农林村、荣林村、崟塘村、金姑村、古塘村、桃林村、鸟冲村、洪家冲村、七里冲村、翻江村、陡岗村、杨和村、高坪村、高桥村、南郑村、吉长村、吉洞村、大乐村、武陵村、新雄村、碧高村、丁家村、黄塘村、刘湾村、枫山村、桂元村、长岗村、蒋家坳村、八家桥村、林章村、向东村、铁马村、茶杯村、东坪村、中山村、歧山村、塘坪村、傅家村、石鹿村、园艺场村、园梁村、洪门村、荣溪村、侧山村、瓦屋村).

== Geography ==
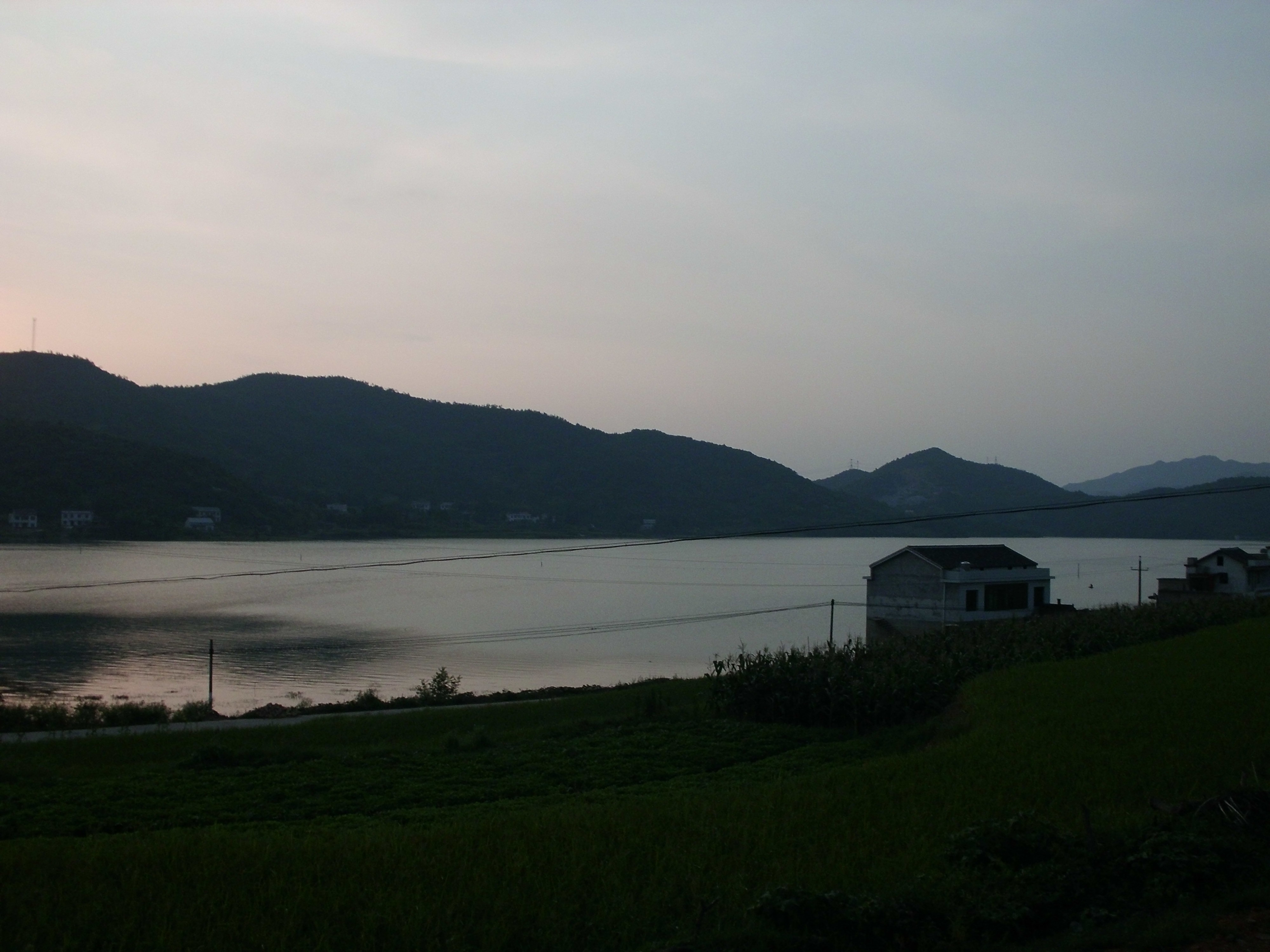
Taolin Reservoir.

Taolin Reservoir (桃林水库) is the largest reservoir and largest body of water in the town.

Mount Baozhong (褒忠山) is the peak-point in the town, its peak elevation is 802 metres (2,631 ft).

== Transportation ==
=== Expressway ===
The Changsha-Shaoshan-Loudi Expressway, which runs east through Yueshan Town, Jinsou Township, Huitang Town, Jinshi Town, Donghutang Town, Huaminglou Town, Daolin Town to Yuelu District, Changsha, and the west through Hutian Town to Louxing District, Loudi.

The Yiyang-Loudi-Hengyang Expressway in Hunan Province leads to Loudi City, Yiyang City and Hengyang City through the town.

=== Provincial Highway ===
The Provincial Highway S311 is a northwest–southeast highway in the town.
