= Huaminglou =

Huaminglou Town 花明楼镇
- Town
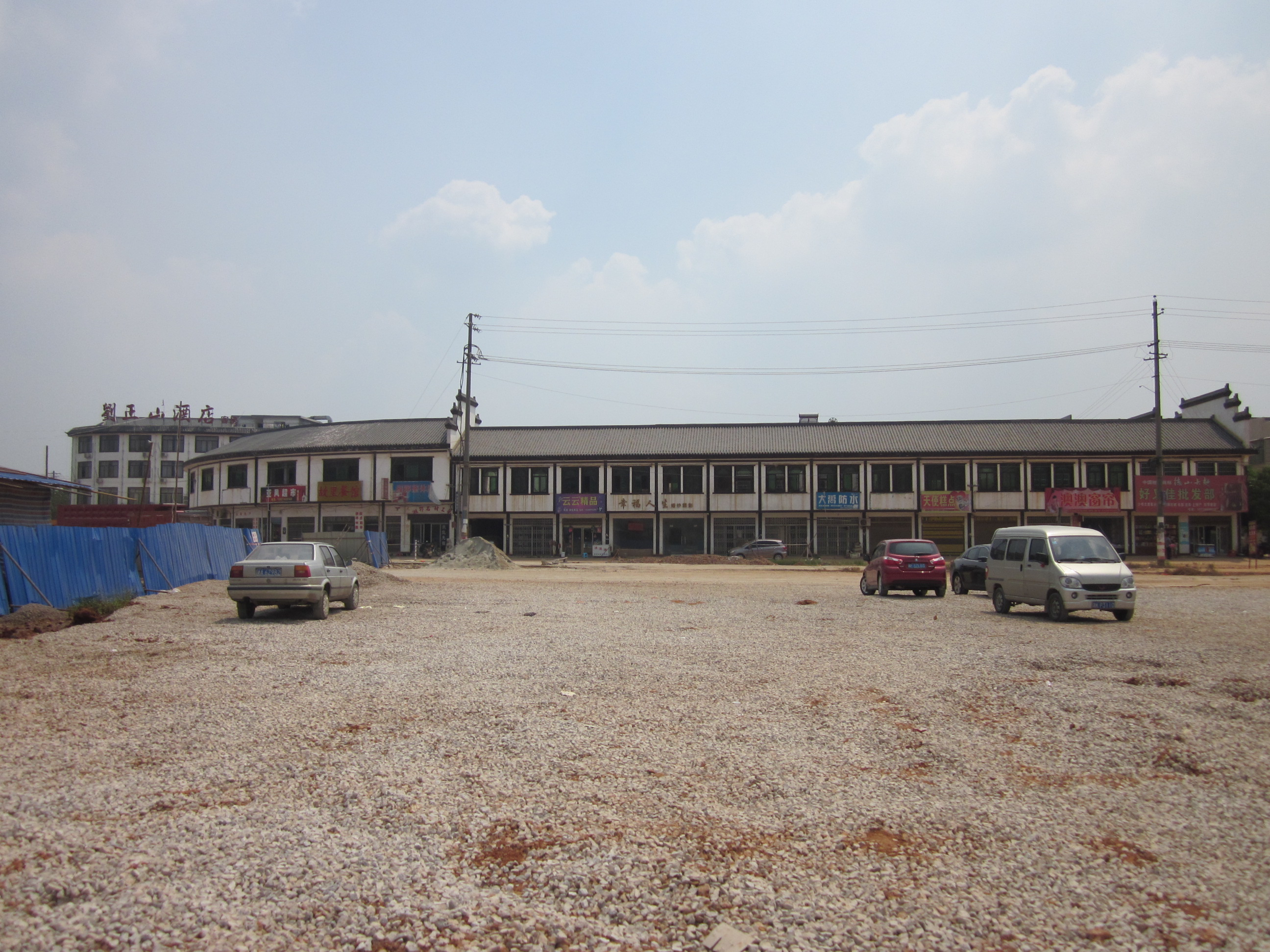

- Location in Hunan
- Coordinates: 28°02′30″N 112°38′10″E
- Country: People's Republic of China
- Province: Hunan
- Prefecture-level city: Changsha
- County-level city: Ningxiang

Area
  - Total: 112.4 km^{2} (43.4 sq mi)

Population
  - Total: 51,000
  - Density: 450/km^{2} (1,200/sq mi)
- Time zone: UTC+08:00 (China Standard)
- Postal code: 410611
- Area code: 0731

Chinese name
- Traditional Chinese: 花明樓鎮
- Simplified Chinese: 花明楼镇
Transcriptions
Standard Mandarin
- Hanyu Pinyin: Huāmínglóu Zhèn

Huaminglou (Chinese: 花明楼镇) is a rural town in Ningxiang City, Hunan Province, China. It is surrounded by Ruyi Township on the west, Donghutang Town on the north, Daolin Town on the eastsouth, Lianhua Town and Yuchangping Town on the northeast, and Datunying on the south. As of the 2000 census it had a population of 45,634 and an area of 112.4 square kilometres (43.4 sq mi).

== Administrative divisions ==
The town is divided into eight villages and one community, which include the following areas:

- Liu Family Community (刘家社区)
- Tanzichong (炭子冲村)
- Huaminglou (花明楼村)
- Zhushiqiao (朱石桥村)
- Jinjiang (靳江村)
- Jinyuan (靳源村)
- Lianxinqiao (联新桥)
- Changshan (常山村)
- Yanglinqiao (杨林桥村)

== History ==
In 2019, the Changsha Municipal Government decided to build it into a "Red Cultural Tourism Town".

== Geography ==
The Jin River flows through the town.

== Economy ==
The region abounds with refractory clay.

== Education ==
There is one senior high school located with the town limits: Ningxiang No.4 High School (Chinese: 宁乡四中).There are two junior high schools and six primary schools located with the town.

== Culture ==
Huaguxi is the most influential local theater.

== Transportation ==
=== Provincial Highway ===
The Provincial Highway S219 (省道S219) runs east and intersects with S50 Changsha-Shaoshan-Loudi Expressway and G0421 Xuchang–Guangzhou Expressway.

=== Expressway ===
The Changsha-Shaoshan-Loudi Expressway, which runs east through Daolin Town to Yuelu District, Changsha, and the west through Donghutang Town, Jinshi Town, Huitang Town, Jinsou Township, Yueshan Town, Hutian Town to Louxing District, Loudi.

The northern terminus of Shaoshan Expressway is at the town.

=== County Road ===
The County Road X087 runs northwest to Donghutang Town and runs east to Daolin Town.

The County Road X085 runs north and intersects with Yue-Ning Avenue.

The County Road X217 runs southeast to Datunying Town.

The County Road X090 runs southwest to Sanxian'ao Township.

== Attractions ==
The Former Residence of Liu Shaoqi is a famous scenic spot. It was originally built in late Qing dynasty (1644–1911).

== Celebrity ==
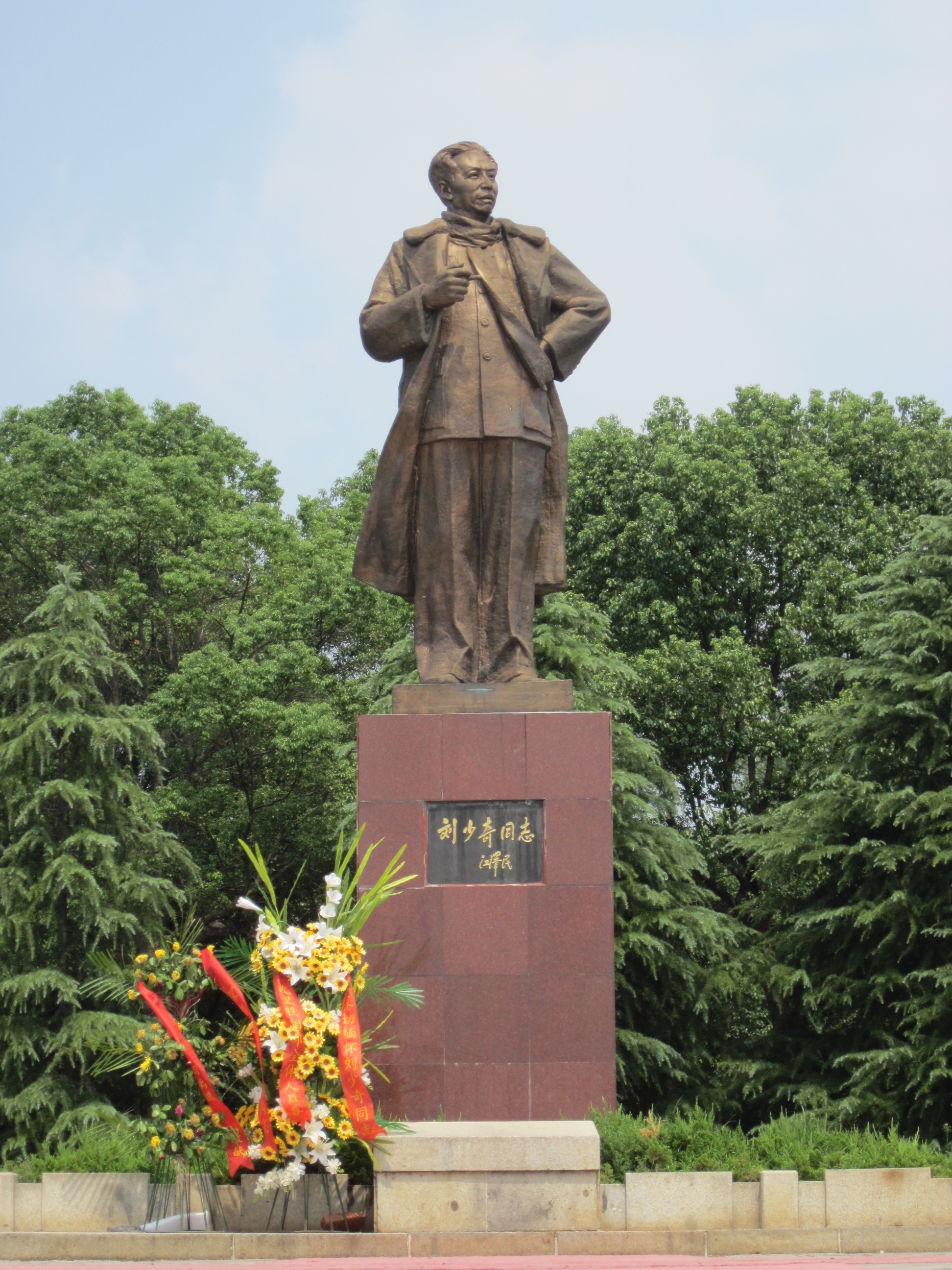
Liu Shaoqi's statue, in the Former Residence of Liu Shaoqi.

- Tao Runai (陶汝鼐; Táo Rǔnaì), scholar.
- Tao Lidian (陶立典; Táo Lìdiǎn), scholar.
- Wang Tanxiu (王坦修; Wáng Tǎnxiū), scholar.
- Yuan Mingyao (袁名曜; Yuán Míngyào), scholar.
- Zhu Yidian (朱衣点; 朱衣點; Zhū Yīdiǎn), general.
- Chen Jiading (陈家鼎; 陳家鼎; Chén Jiādǐng), revolutionist.
- Zhou Wen (周文; Zhōu Wén), sculptor.
- Yang Shichao (杨世焯; 楊世焯; Yáng Shìchāo), artist.
- Yang Peizhen (杨佩贞; 楊佩貞; Yáng Peìzhēn), artist.
- Qi Xueqi (齐学启; 齊學啟; Qí Xuéqǐ), general of the Kuomintang (KMT).
- Liu Shaoqi (刘少奇; 劉少奇; Liú Shàoqí), politician.
