= Daolin =

Daolin Town 道林镇
- Town
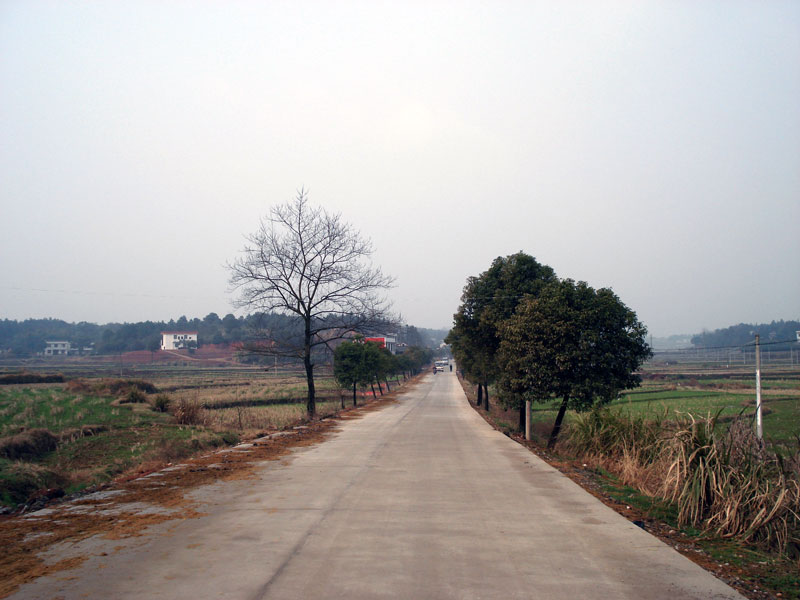
- Road in Daolin.

- Location in Hunan
- Coordinates: 28°00′28″N 112°43′29″E
- Country: People's Republic of China
- Province: Hunan
- Prefecture-level city: Changsha
- County-level city: Ningxiang

Area
  - Total: 112.4 km^{2} (43.4 sq mi)

Population
  - Total: 51,000
  - Density: 450/km^{2} (1,200/sq mi)
- Time zone: UTC+08:00 (China Standard)
- Postal code: 410615
- Area code: 0731

Chinese name
- Traditional Chinese: 道林鎮
- Simplified Chinese: 道林镇
Transcriptions
Standard Mandarin
- Hanyu Pinyin: Dàolín Zhèn

Daolin (Chinese: 道林镇) is a rural town in Ningxiang City, Hunan Province, China. It has an area of 135 square kilometers. It is surrounded by Lianhua Town on the north, Hanpu Town and Xiangtang Township on the southeast, and Datunying and Huaminglou Town on the west. As of the 2000 census it had a population of 54,500.

== Administrative divisions ==
The Town is divided into eight villages and one community, which include the following areas:

- Daolin Community (道林社区)
- Jinhua (金华村)
- Jinshui (靳水村)
- Shanshanling (善山岭村)
- Xinxing (鑫星村)
- Huaxinshi (华鑫市村)
- Hedongxin (河东新村)
- Longquanhu (龙泉湖村)
- Shijin (石金村)

== History ==
During the Southern Song dynasty, Xie Ying (谢英) retired into the country, he lived in here, and named it "Daolin" (道林), Xie Ying's tomb is located in here.

== Geography ==
The Jin River, a tributary of the Xiang River, flows through the town.

== Economy ==
The region abounds with refractory clay.

== Culture ==
Huaguxi is the most influential local theater.

== Transportation ==
=== Expressway ===
The Changsha-Shaoshan-Loudi Expressway, which runs east to Yuelu District, Changsha, and the west through Huaminglou Town, Donghutang Town, Jinshi Town, Huitang Town, Jinsou Township, Yueshan Town, Hutian Town to Louxing District, Loudi.

The S61 Yueyang-Linwu Expressway in Hunan leads to Yueyang and Linwu County through the town.

The G0421 Xuchang–Guangzhou Expressway runs north to south through the town.

The G60 Shanghai–Kunming Expressway runs east to southwest through the town.

=== Provincial Highway ===
The Provincial Highway S219 begins at Daolin Community and travels northeast to the town of Lianhua.

The Dao-Shan Highway runs north and reaches its junction with the Provincial Highway S219, and runs southeast and reaches its junction with the G0421 Xuchang–Guangzhou Expressway.

=== County Road ===
The County Road X087 travels northwest to Huaminglou. The County Road X089 travels southwest to Datunying. The County Road X088 travels south to Yunhuqiao.

=== Railway ===
The Shanghai–Kunming high-speed railway passes through the town east to west.

== Attractions ==
The local specialties such as the Daolin fish, the Daolin rice, the Daolin jujube.

== Notable people ==
- Xie Ying (谢英; 謝英; Xiè Yīng), was a Chinese writer and poet of the Song dynasty (960–1279).
- Li Zehou (李泽厚; 李澤厚; Lǐ Zéhoù), is a Chinese scholar of philosophy and intellectual history, currently residing in the United States.
- Lu Shixian (鲁实先; 魯實先; Lǔ Shíxiān; 1913–1977), was a Chinese historian.
- Jiang Peichang (蒋沛昌; 蔣沛昌; Jiǎng Peìchāng), scientist.
- Lu Gan (鲁敢; 魯敢; Lǔ Gǎn), entrepreneur.
- Lu Diping (鲁涤平; 魯滌平; Lǔ Dípíng; 1887–1935), was a Chinese general and politician.
- Yang Dazhang (杨达章; 楊達章; Yáng Dázhāng), general.
