= Donghutang =

Donghutang Town 东湖塘镇
- Town
- Location in Hunan
- Coordinates: 28°04′10″N 112°32′39″E
- Country: People's Republic of China
- Province: Hunan
- Prefecture-level city: Changsha
- County-level city: Ningxiang

Area
  - Total: 138 km^{2} (53 sq mi)

Population
  - Total: 47,000
  - Density: 340/km^{2} (880/sq mi)
- Time zone: UTC+08:00 (China Standard)
- Postal code: 410614
- Area code: 0731

Chinese name
- Traditional Chinese: 東湖塘鎮
- Simplified Chinese: 东湖塘镇
Transcriptions
Standard Mandarin
- Hanyu Pinyin: Dōnghútáng Zhèn

Donghutang (Chinese: 东湖塘镇) is a rural town in Ningxiang City, Hunan Province, China. It is surrounded by Yanglin Township and Ruyi Township on the west, Xiaduopu Town and Nantianping Township on the north, Yuchangping Town on the east, and Huaminglou Town on the south. As of the 2000 census it had a population of 47,516 and an area of 138 square kilometres (53 sq mi).

== Administrative divisions ==
The Town is divided into seven villages and one community:

- Donghutang Community (东湖塘社区)
- Taipingqiao (太平桥村)
- Quanshan (泉山村)
- Mashan (麻山村)
- Taojiawan (陶家湾村)
- Yanshan (燕山村)
- Xichongshan (西冲山村)
- Quantangwan (泉塘湾村)

== Geography ==
The Wei River and Jin River flow through the town.

== Economy ==
Citrus is important to the economy.

The region abounds with coal, refractory clay and iron.

== Culture ==
Huaguxi is the most influential local theater.

== Transportation ==
=== Provincial Highway ===
The Provincial Highway S208 (208省道) from Yutan Subdistrict, running through Donghutang Town, Huaminglou Town to Shaoshan City.

=== Expressway ===
The Changsha-Shaoshan-Loudi Expressway, which runs east through Huaminglou Town and Daolin Town to Yuelu District, Changsha, and the west through Jinshi Town, Huitang Town, Jinsou Township, Yueshan Town, Hutian Town to Louxing District, Loudi.

The Shaoshan Expressway runs through the town.

=== County Road ===
The County Road X087 runs southeast to Huaminglou Town.

The County Road X023 runs southwest and intersects with the Provincial Highway S208.

== Notable individuals ==
- Zhou Zhenlin (周震鱗), revolutionary.
