= Jinsou, Xiangxiang =

Jinsou Township 金薮乡
- Township
- Location in Hunan
- Coordinates: 27°56′36″N 112°18′32″E
- Country: People's Republic of China
- Province: Hunan
- Prefecture-level city: Xiangtan
- County-level city: Xiangxiang

Area
  - Total: 98.7 km^{2} (38.1 sq mi)

Population
  - Total: 37,000
  - Density: 370/km^{2} (970/sq mi)
- Time zone: UTC+8 (China Standard)
- Postal code: 411400
- Area code: 0732

Jinsou Township (simplified Chinese: 金薮乡; traditional Chinese: 金藪鄉; pinyin: Jīnsǒu Xiāng) is a rural township in the northwest of Xiangxiang City, Hunan Province, People's Republic of China.

== Administrative divisions ==
The township is divided into 29 villages, which include the following areas: Jinsou Village, Fengshan Village, Hetang Village, Fuzheng Village, Baisha Village, Pashi Village, Souling Village, Longmen Village, Zhuyuan Village, Huaqiao Village, Pushi Village, Dushi Village, Yongle Village, Dinan Village, Fukang Village, Changle Village, Heshan Village, Zhenzhu Village, Dongling Village, Bayan Village, Jiangjia Village, Shunan Village, Duizi Village, Naping Village, Hongshi Village, Tuanshan Village, Maizi Village, Baoshi Village, Nanxing and Huashi Village (金薮、丰山、荷塘、辅正、白沙、耙石、薮岭、龙门、竹园、花桥、普石、独石、永乐、地南、扶康、长乐、河山、珍珠、东陵、八眼、江家、属南、堆子、马坪、红石、团山、麦子、抱石、南星、花石).

== Transportation ==
=== Expressway ===
The Changsha-Shaoshan-Loudi Expressway, which runs east through Huitang Town, Jinshi Town, Donghutang Town, Huaminglou Town and Daolin Town to Yuelu District, Changsha, and the west through Yueshan Town, Hutian Town to Louxing District, Loudi.
