= Jinshi, Xiangxiang =

Jinshi Town 金石镇
- Town
- Location in Hunan
- Coordinates: 28°00′10″N 112°27′16″E
- Country: People's Republic of China
- Province: Hunan
- Prefecture-level city: Xiangtan
- County-level city: Xiangxiang

Area
  - Total: 88.9 km^{2} (34.3 sq mi)

Population
  - Total: 35,860
  - Density: 403/km^{2} (1,040/sq mi)
- Time zone: UTC+8 (China Standard)
- Postal code: 411400
- Area code: 0732

Jinshi Town (simplified Chinese: 金石镇; traditional Chinese: 金石鎮; pinyin: Jīnshí Zhèn) is an urban town in Xiangxiang City, Hunan Province, People's Republic of China.

== Administrative divisions ==
As of 2018, the town administers 10 villages and two residential communities: Lijiawan Community (理佳湾), Tielutang Community (铁炉塘), Dahu Village (大湖村), Jinshi Village (金石村), Jin'an Village (金安村), Shiba Village (石坝村), Wenxing Village (文星村), Taiping Village (太平村), Longtan Village (龙潭村), Dachang Village (大长村), Zhuangyuan Village (状元村), and Guandong Village (关东村).

== Transportation ==
=== Expressway ===
The Changsha-Shaoshan-Loudi Expressway, which runs east through Donghutang Town, Huaminglou Town and Daolin Town to Yuelu District, Changsha, and the west through Huitang Town, Jinsou Township, Yueshan Town, Hutian Town to Louxing District, Loudi.

== Notable people ==
- Song Wenhan, a lieutenant general in the People's Liberation Army who served as chief of staff of the Guangzhou Military Region from 1996 to 2002.
