= Hutian, Xiangxiang =

Hutian Town
- Town

Chinese transcription(s)
  - Simplified: 壶天镇
  - Traditional: 壺天鎮
  - Pinyin: Hútiān Zhèn
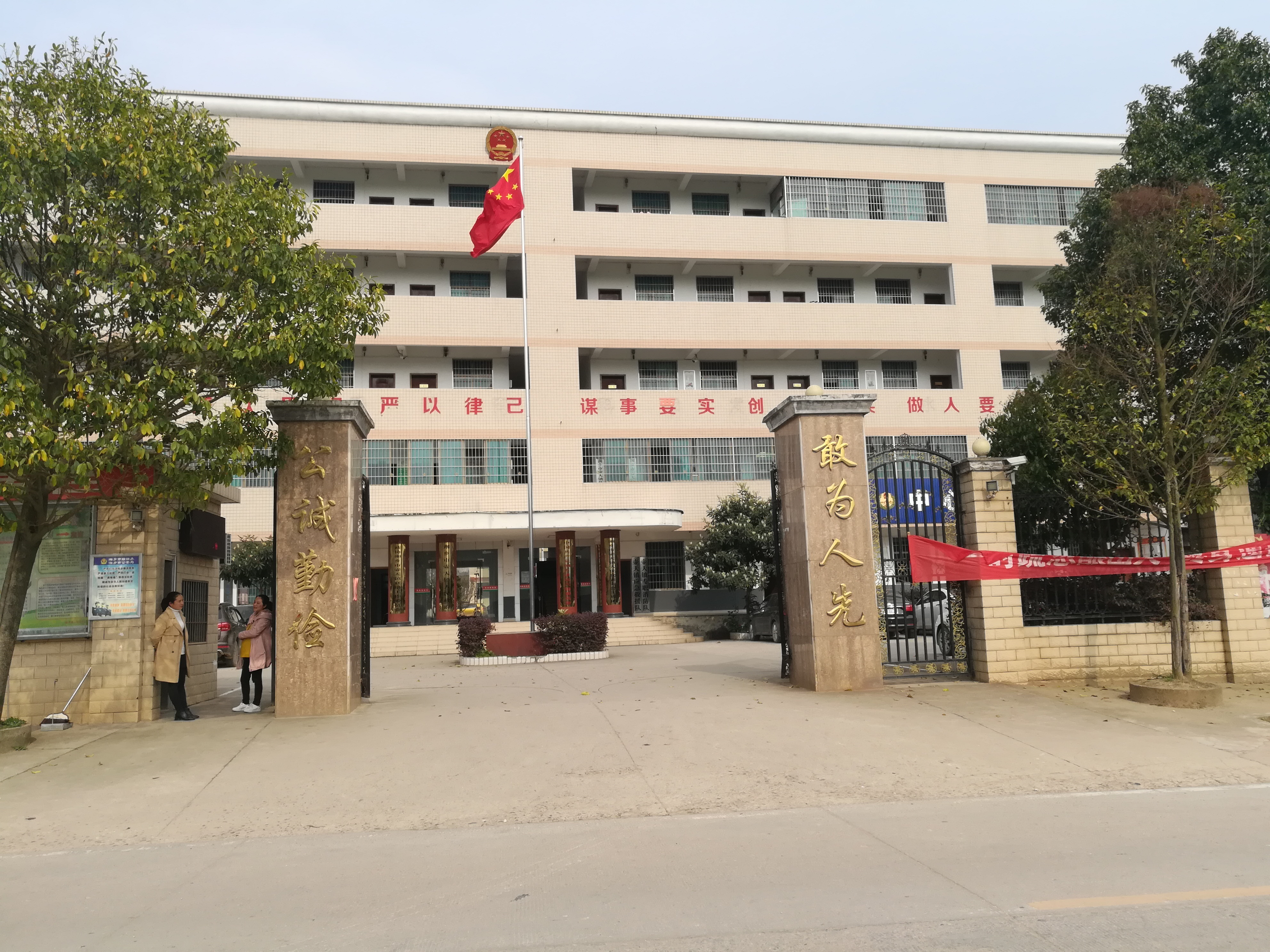
- Government building of Hutian Town.

- Location in China
- Coordinates: 27°52′40″N 112°02′55″E
- Country: People's Republic of China
- Province: Hunan
- Prefecture: Xiangtan
- County-level city: Xiangxiang

Area
  - Total: 144.7 km^{2} (55.9 sq mi)

Population
  - Total: 49,580
  - Density: 342.6/km^{2} (887.4/sq mi)
- Time zone: UTC+8 (China Standard)
- Postal code: 411400
- Area code: 0732

Hutian Town (simplified Chinese: 壶天镇; traditional Chinese: 壺天鎮; pinyin: Hútiān Zhèn) is a rural town in Xiangxiang, Hunan, China.

== Administrative divisions ==
The town is divided into 52 villages and two communities, which include the following areas: Hutian Community, Beifengpu Community, Huzhong Village, Xiaoshui Village, Daping Village, Rixin Village, Shutang Village, Shishi Village, Hutian Village, Longdang Village, Tongsheng Village, Zhongshi Village, Shichun Village, Yanjiang Village, Xinpo Village, Guanghui Village, Guangsheng Village, Xiangxi Village, Xiashankou Village, Zhidong Village, Hengdong Village, Hedong Village, Dajin Village, Nanyue Village, Tanxi Village, Shangxinqiao Village, Shigu Village, Duizi Village, Xiamu Village, Ma'anshi Village, Tanqiao Village, Shuangping Village, Paizishi Village, Shanchong Village, Dongduan Village, Shiyan Village, Shanping Village, Wuyi Village, Tuotangwan Village, Datang Village, Jianshan Village, Outang Village, Shiping Village, Chongxi Village, Xinpuzi Village, Xionghui Village, Jinquan Village, Jinqiao Village, Jingwan Village, Yanqian Village, Yanlong Village, and Hongfeng Village (壶天社区、北风铺社区、壶中村、小水村、大坪村、日新村、树塘村、石狮村、壶天村、龙凼村、同升村、中石村、石春村、岩江村、新坡村、光辉村、光胜村、湘溪村、峡山口村、直东村、横东村、合东村、大金村、南岳村、潭溪村、上新桥村、石鼓村、堆子村、下木村、马鞍石村、谭桥村、双坪村、牌子石村、杉冲村、东段村、石燕村、山坪村、五一村、托塘湾村、大塘村、涧山村、藕塘村、石坪村、崇溪村、新铺子村、雄辉村、金泉村、金桥村、井湾村、岩前村、岩龙村、洪丰村).

== Geography ==
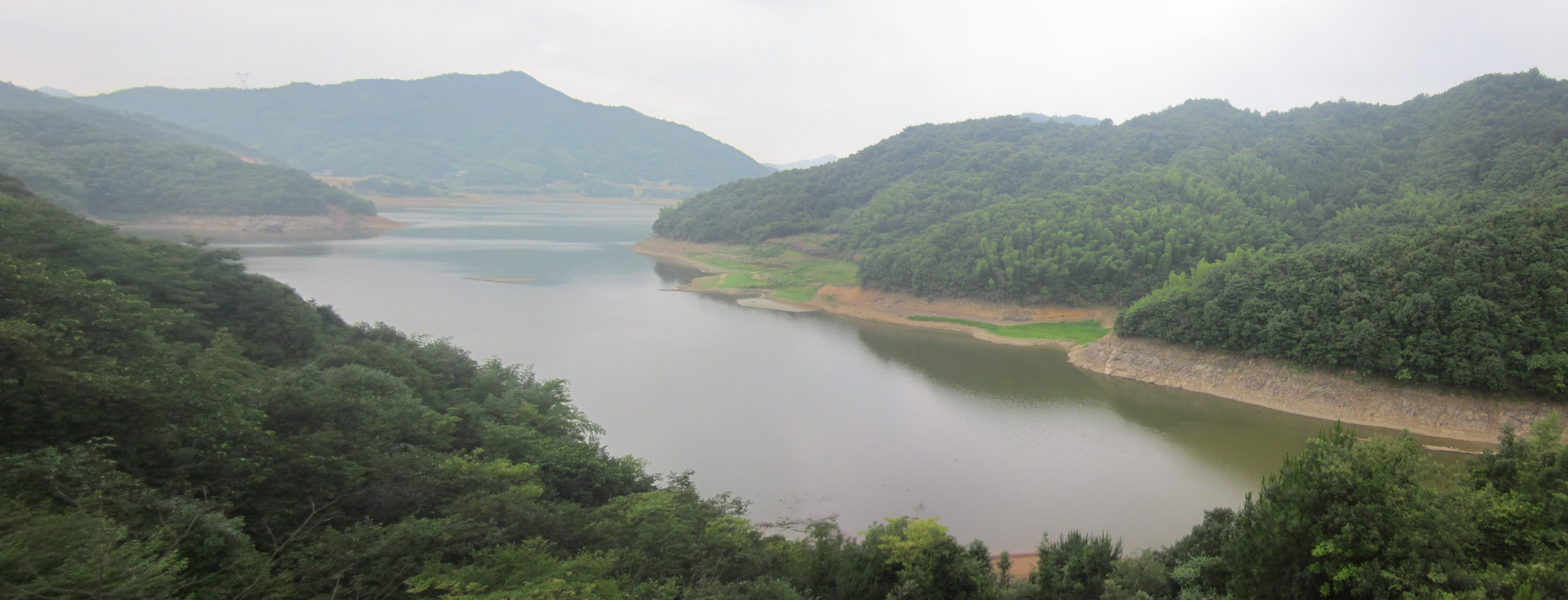
Hedong Reservoir.
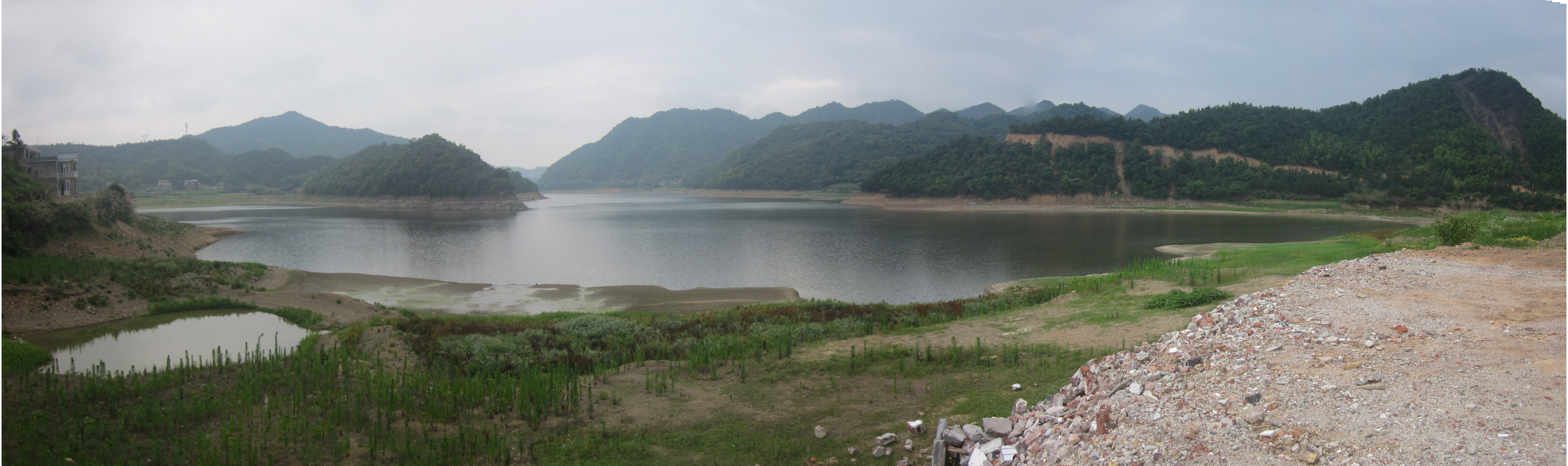
Panorama of Hedong Reservoir.

Hedong Reservoir (合东水库) is a reservoir and the largest water body in the town.

== Transportation ==
=== Expressway ===
The Changsha-Shaoshan-Loudi Expressway, which runs east through Fanjiang Town, Jinsou Township, Huitang Town, Jinshi Town, Donghutang Town, Huaminglou Town and Daolin Town to Yuelu District, Changsha, and the west to Louxing District, Loudi.

=== Provincial Highway ===
The Provincial Highway S209 runs south–north through the town.

=== Railway ===
The Luoyang–Zhanjiang Railway, from Luoyang City, Henan Province to Zhanjiang City, Guangdong Province, through Qingshanqiao Town at Qingshanqiao Railway Station.

== Notable people ==
- Zhou Qunfei, entrepreneur.

== Gallery ==
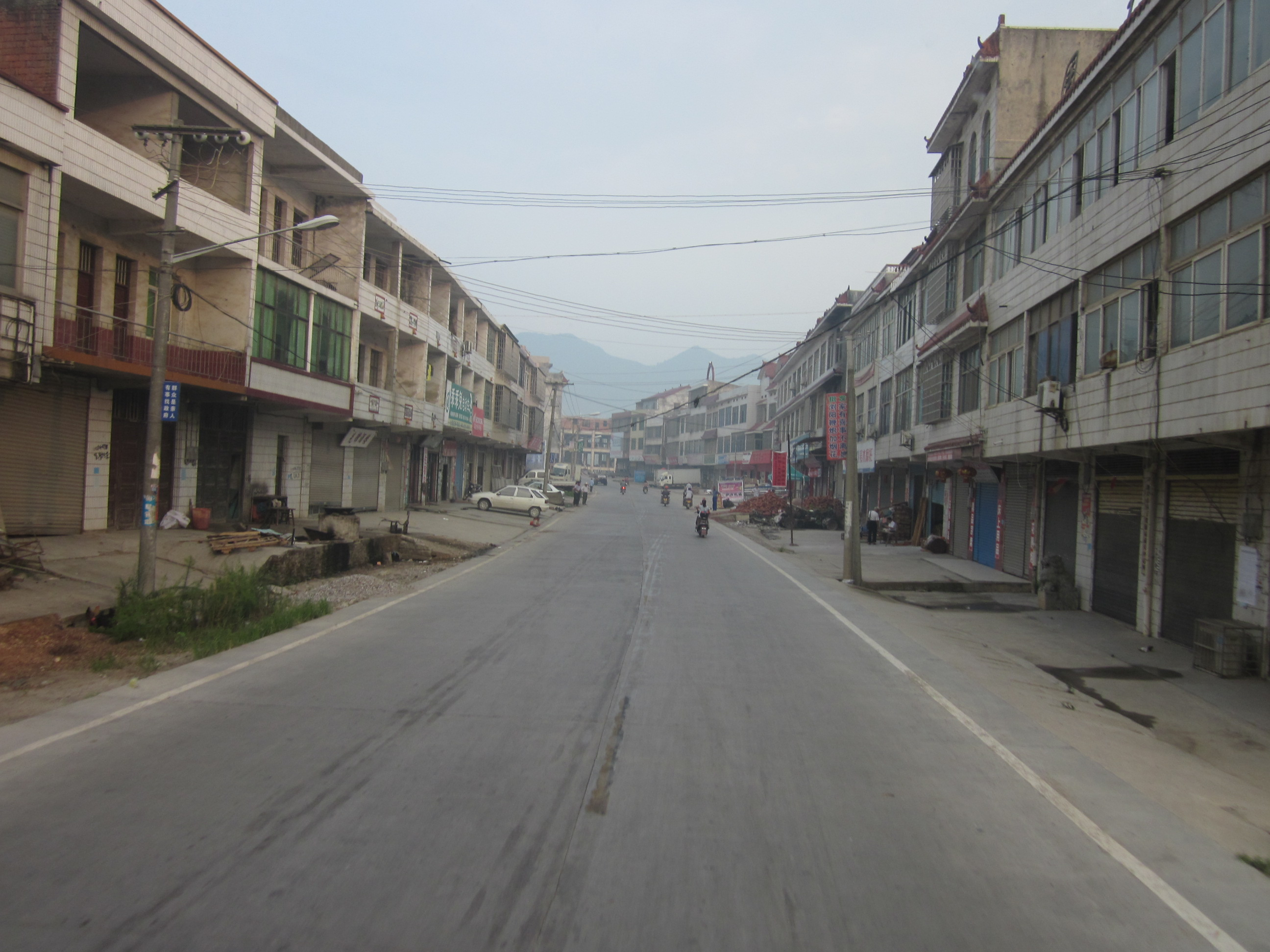
Buildings in Hutian Town.

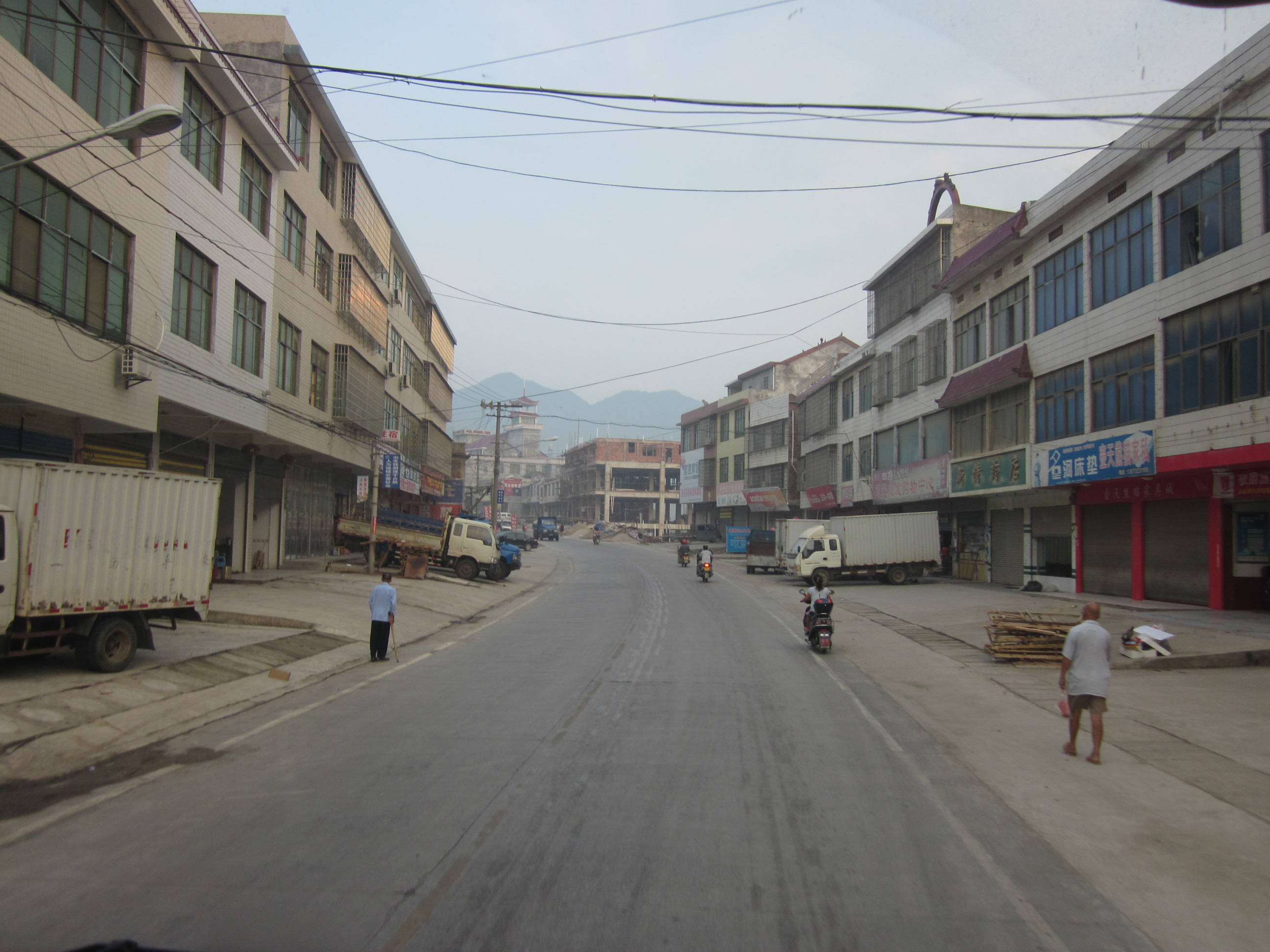
Buildings in Hutian Town.

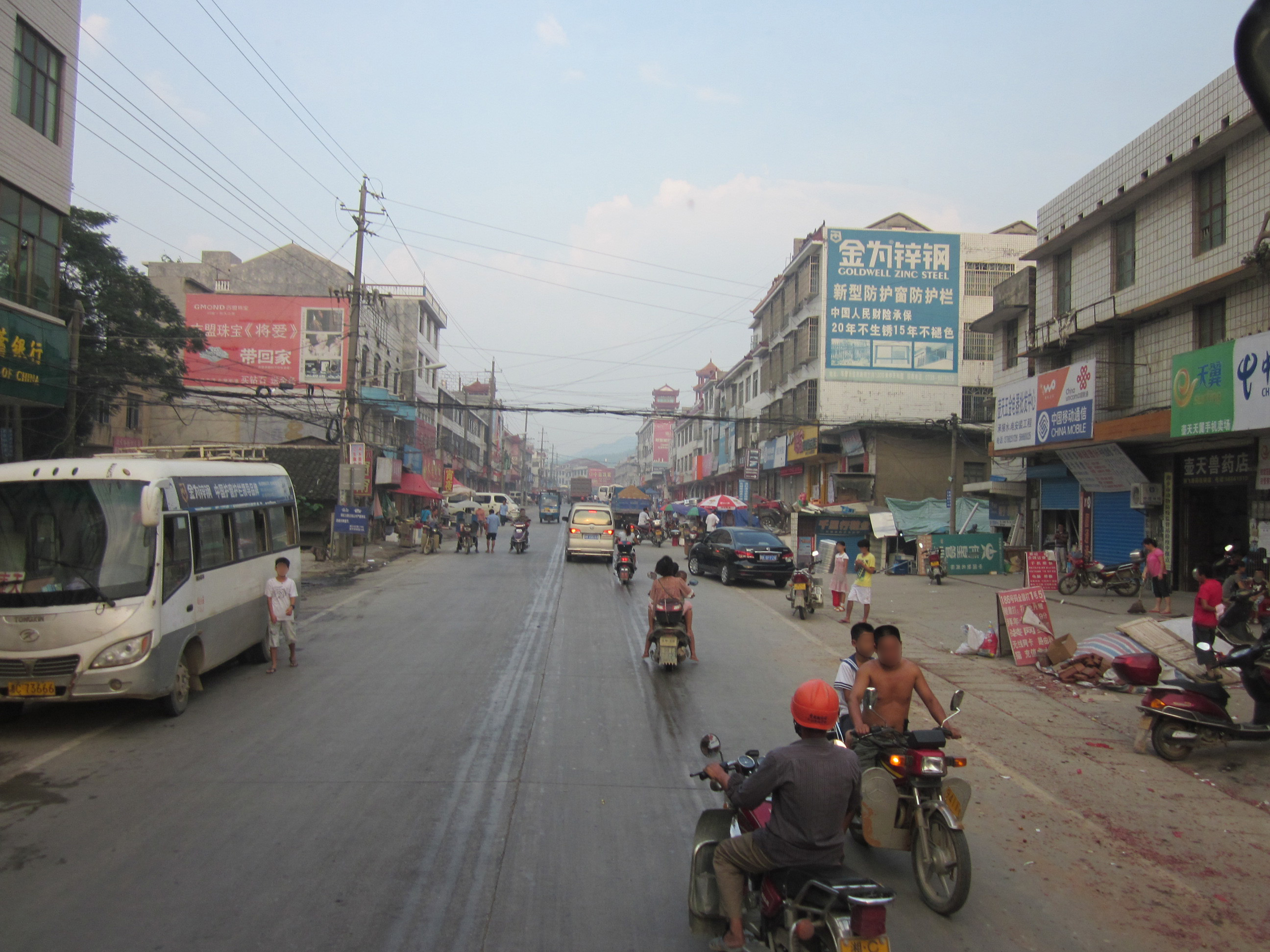
Buildings in Hutian Town.

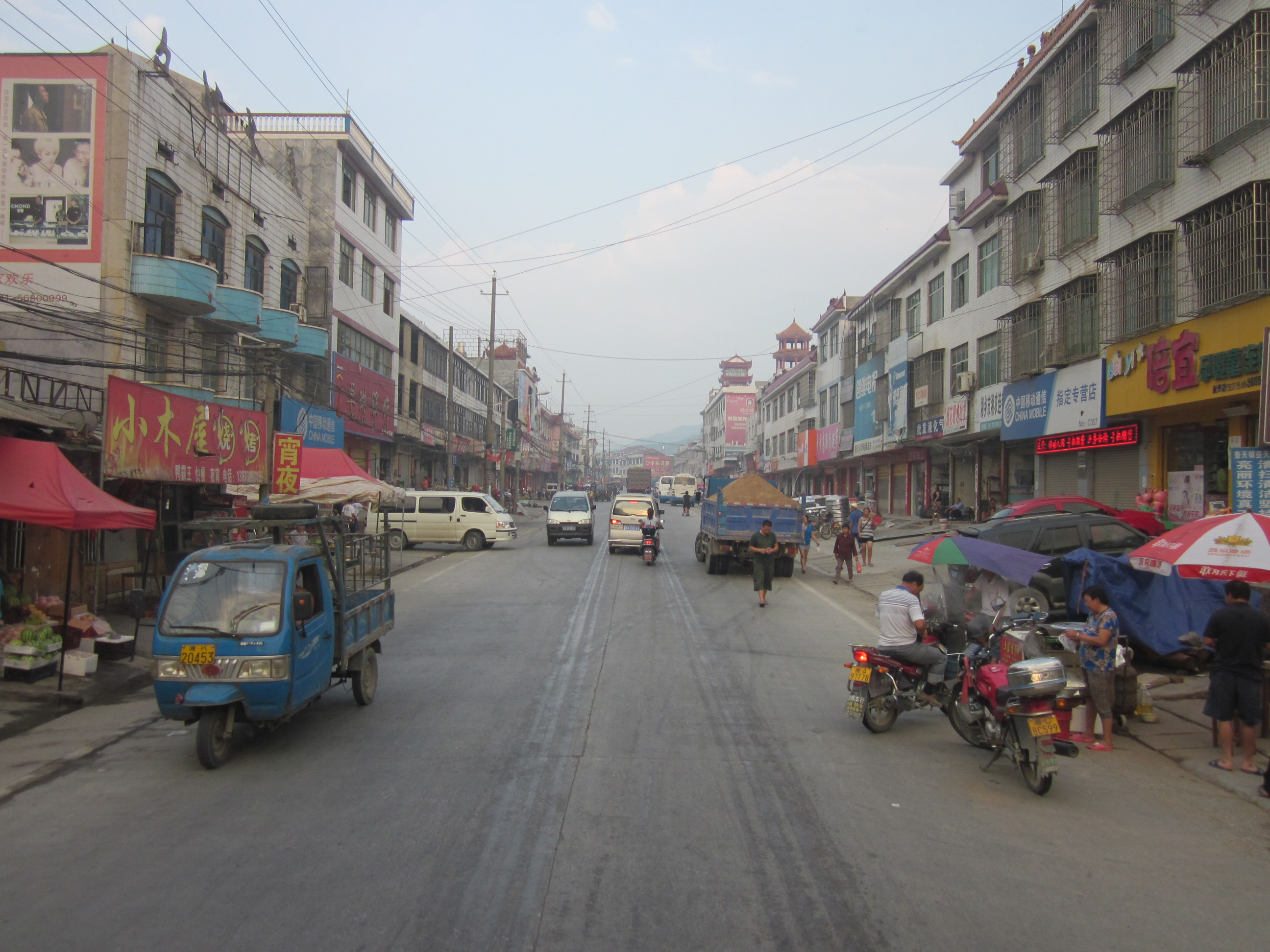
Buildings in Hutian Town.

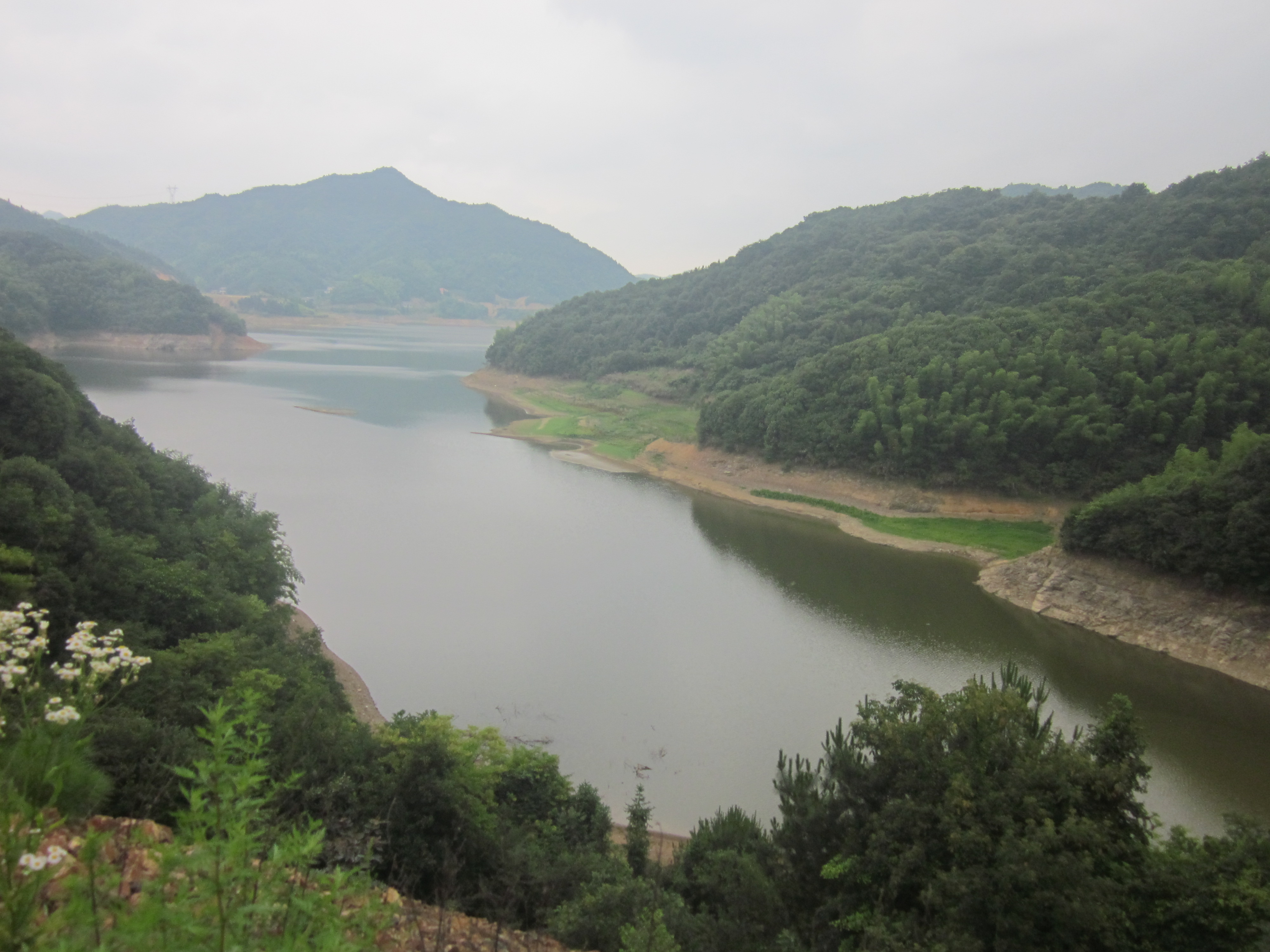
A corner of Hedong Reservoir.

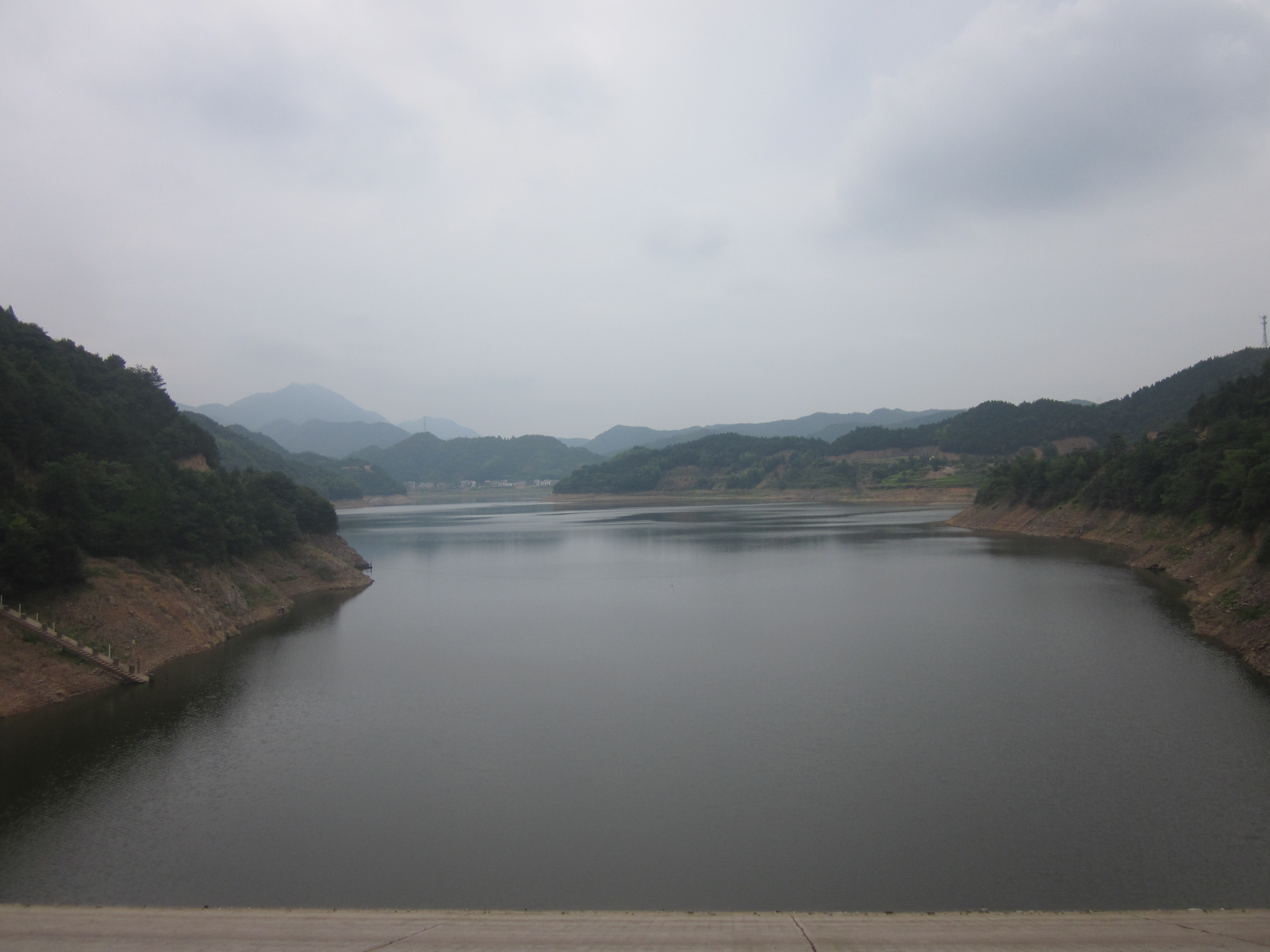
View of Hedong Reservoir from the dam.
