= Qi Xueqi =

- 齊學啟
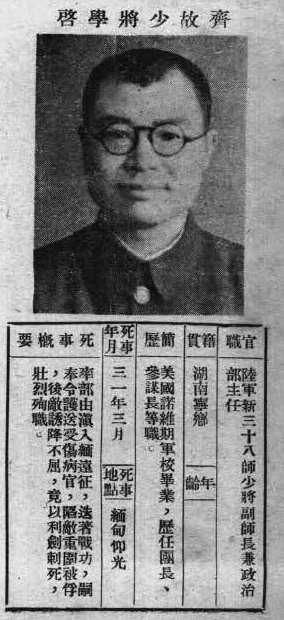
- Qi in 1947
- Born: August 28, 1900; Changsha, Hunan
- Died: March 8, 1945 (aged 44)
- Cause of death: assassination
- Education: Tsinghua University
- Occupation: Military commander
- Years active: 1932–1945
- Organization: Kuomintang
- Spouses: Li Houlin (李厚霖); Wang Yuelun (王岳倫)
- Partners: Xiang (向氏); Tong Xijun (童锡俊)
- Parent: Qi Zhizhang (齊直章)

Qi Xueqi (Chinese: 齊學啟; pinyin: Qí Xuéqǐ; August 28, 1900 – March 8, 1945) was an counter-Japanese commander of the Kuomintang (KMT).

== Early life ==
Qi Xueqi was born in Yanglinqiao Township (楊林橋鄉) (now Huaminglou Town), Ningxiang County (now Ningxiang), Hunan province on August 28, 1900. He attended the Qi family's private homeschool. In 1912, his family moved to Changsha, the capital of Hunan. Qi Xueqi studied in Changjun middle school and showed strengths in literature and foreign language. Four years later, he went to Beijing and studied at Tsinghua University until 1920. While there Qi attended the great student movement on May 4, 1919.

Zhou Demin's brief biography of General Qi Xueqi said that he came back to Changsha after graduating from Tsinghua and worked as a professor at Hunan University, teaching literature and foreign language, while other sources say that he had not graduated until 1923 when he went to the US.

In 1923, Qi went to the city of Northfield, Vermont in the US and majored in horsemanship at Norwich University.

== Career ==
When he returned to in 1929, he was appointed regimental commander of the 6th Military Police Regiment in Nanjing. On January 28, 1932, he led his 6th Regiment to Shanghai when the Japanese attacked Zhabei District. As the commander of the 6th Military Police Regiment, he was on garrison duty in Shanghai and fought a fierce battle against the army of Japan. He was given many awards in the next several years for his bravery in battle.

In 1938 Qi Xueqi came to Changsha and was appointed commander of the city's tax policy. It was an official post with little to do. He applied to fight in the front because he thought that a soldier should be fighting instead of in the rear.

In 1942, he was sent to Burma as vice-commander of the 38th division while the commander was Sun Li-jen. The task of the 38th division was assisting the Allies in their fight against the Japanese.

== Death ==
When Qi was in prison camp, some other prisoners of war, Cai Zongfu, Zhang Jixiang and others, wanted to surrender to get money and become officers of the puppet government of Wang Jingwei. They attempted to persuade Qi to surrender with them, but he refused. In 1945, the Japanese surrendered. The prisoners were liberated and returned to China. Cai and Zhang worried that Qi would make their attempt of betray known, so they assassinated Qi.

== Personal life ==
His mother was Mrs. Zhao (趙氏), His father was Qi Zhizhang (齊直章), aka. Qi Huang (齊璜). He had four sisters. He first married Mrs. Xiang (向氏) and then Tong Xijun (童錫俊).
