= Huitang =

Huitang Town 灰汤镇
- Town
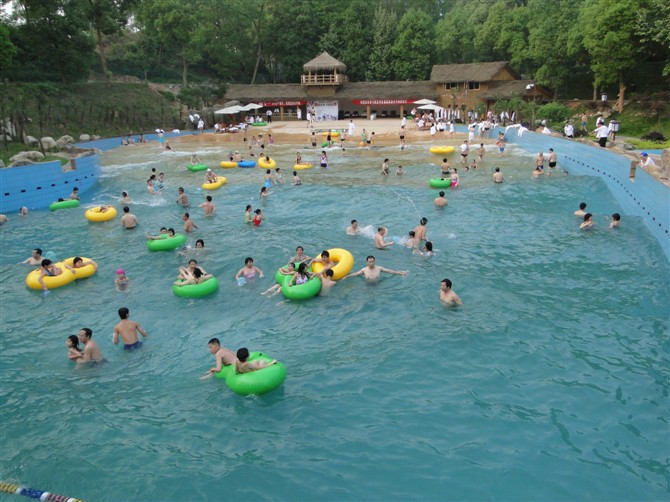

- Location in Hunan
- Coordinates: 27°59′02″N 112°20′21″E
- Country: People's Republic of China
- Province: Hunan
- Prefecture-level city: Changsha
- County-level city: Ningxiang

Area
  - Total: 210.9 km^{2} (81.4 sq mi)

Population (2015)
  - Total: 96,000
  - Density: 460/km^{2} (1,200/sq mi)
- Time zone: UTC+08:00 (China Standard)
- Postal code: 410622
- Area code: 0731

Chinese name
- Traditional Chinese: 灰湯鎮
- Simplified Chinese: 灰汤镇
Transcriptions
Standard Mandarin
- Hanyu Pinyin: Huītāng Zhèn

Huitang (Chinese: 灰汤镇) is a rural town in Ningxiang City, Hunan Province, China. It is surrounded by Fengmuqiao Township on the northwest, Xieleqiao Town on the northeast, and Jinsou Township on the south. As of the 2015 census it had a population of 96,000 and an area of 210.9 square kilometres (81.4 sq mi).

== History ==
Fengmuqiao township and Xieleqiao town merged to Huitang town on November 19, 2015.

== Administrative divisions ==
The town is divided into 16 villages and two communities:

- Tangquan Community (汤泉社区)
- Xie Community (偕乐社区)
- Ningnan (宁南村)
- Shuangjian (双建村)
- Huitang (灰汤村)
- Jinnong (金农村)
- Jiangjun (将军村)
- Zhitian (竹田村)
- Shuangpen (双盆村)
- Bashi (八石村)
- Xing(杏村)
- Dongting (洞庭村)
- Xinfeng (新风村)
- Yongxing (永兴村)
- Niujiaowan (牛角湾村)
- Gunanqiao (古南桥村)
- Huaguoshan (花果山村)
- Fengmuqiao (枫木桥村)

== Geography ==
The Wu River, a tributary of the Wei River, flows through the town.

Dongting Reservoir (洞庭水库) is the largest reservoir and largest water body in the town.

== Culture ==
Huaguxi is the most influential local theater.

== Transportation ==
=== Expressway ===
The Changsha-Shaoshan-Loudi Expressway, which runs east through Jinshi Town, Donghutang Town, Huaminglou Town, and Daolin Town to Yuelu District, Changsha, and the west through Jinsou Township, Yueshan Town, Hutian Town to Louxing District, Loudi.

== Attractions ==
Huitang Hot Spring (灰汤温泉) and Peace Valley of Mount Dongwu (东鹜山桃花谷) are scenic spots in the town.

== Gallery ==
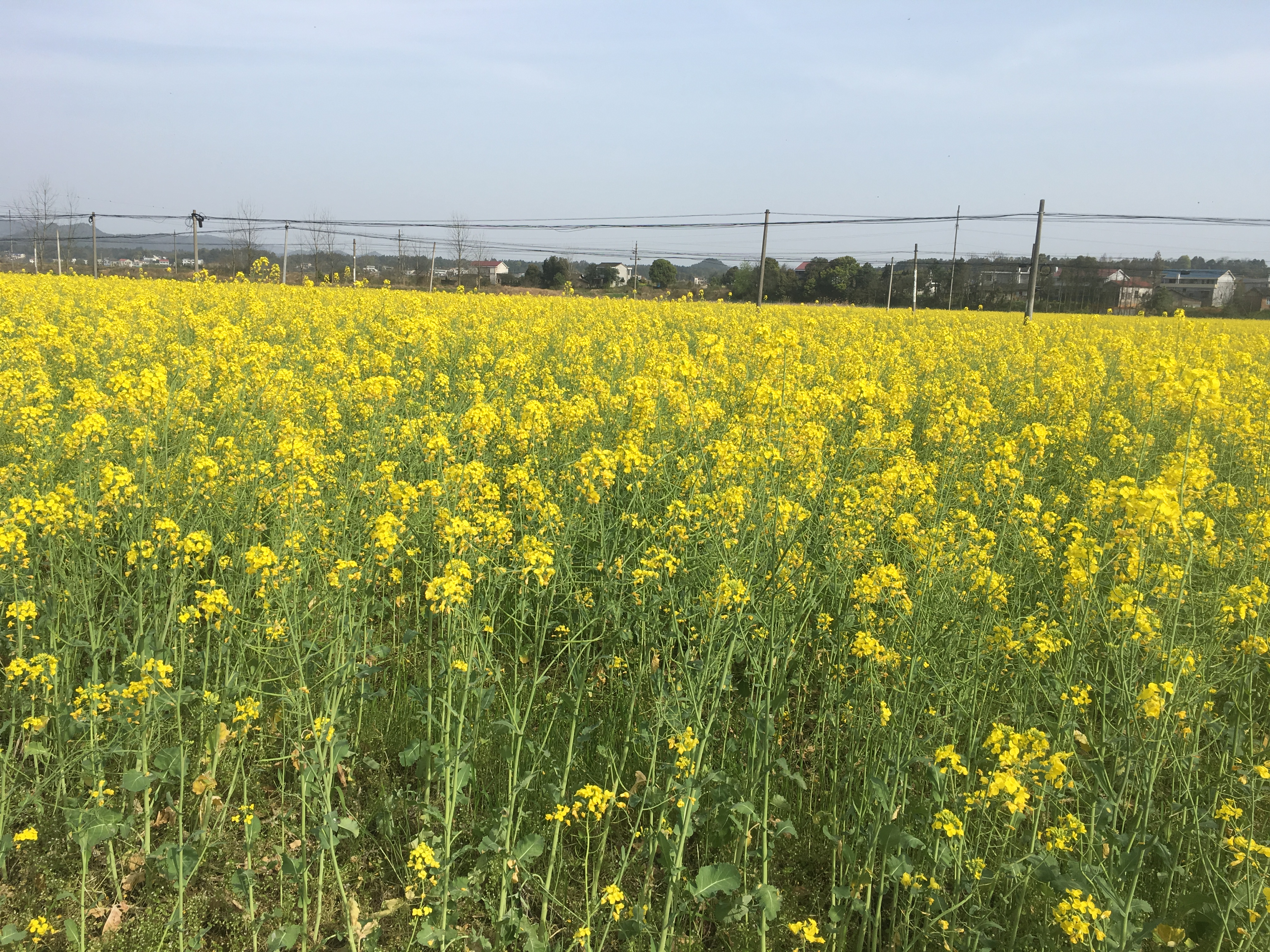
A piece of yellow rapeseed flowers in former Xieleqiao Town (now Huitang Town).

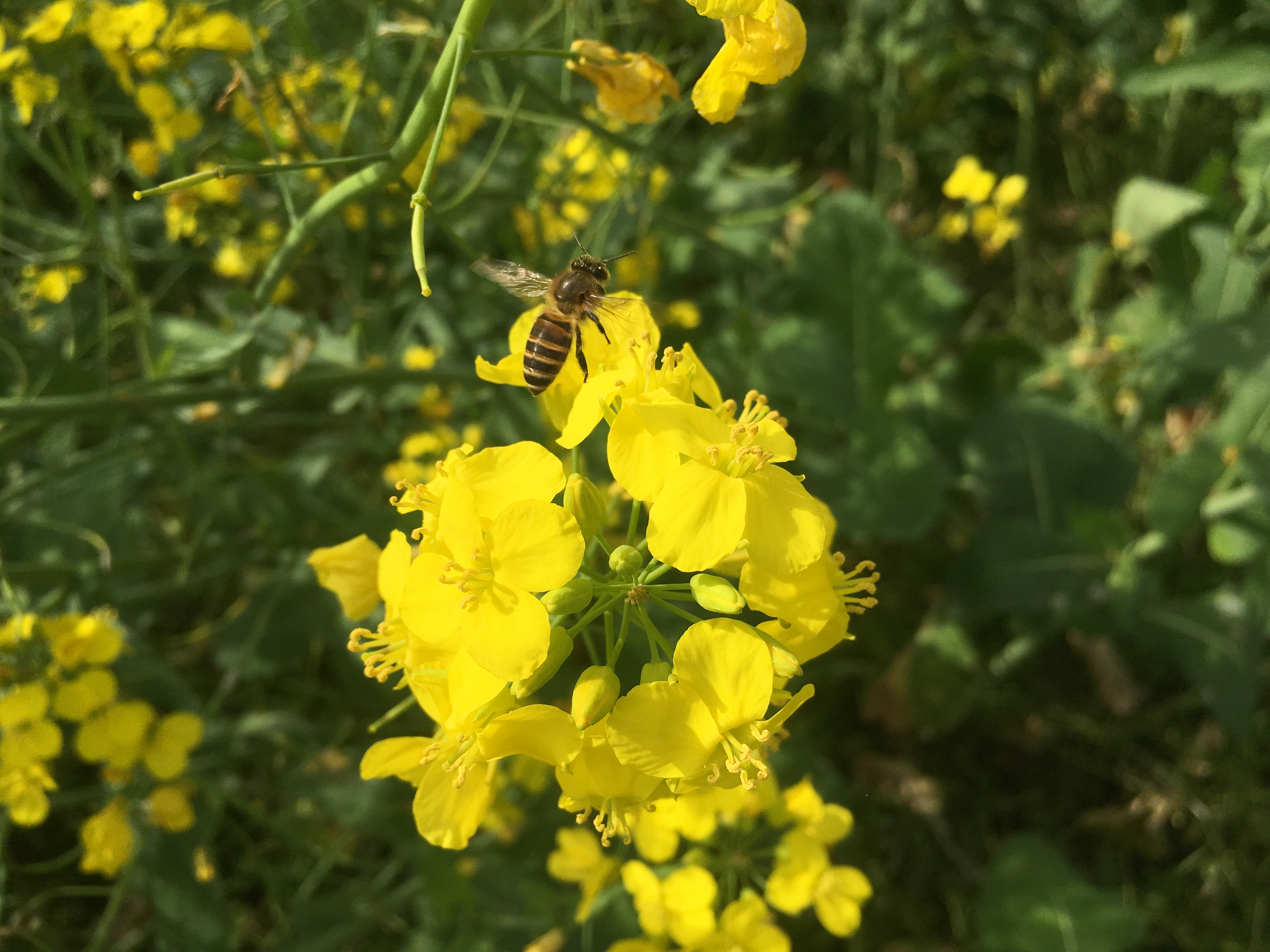
A yellow rapeseed flower in former Xieleqiao Town (now Huitang Town).

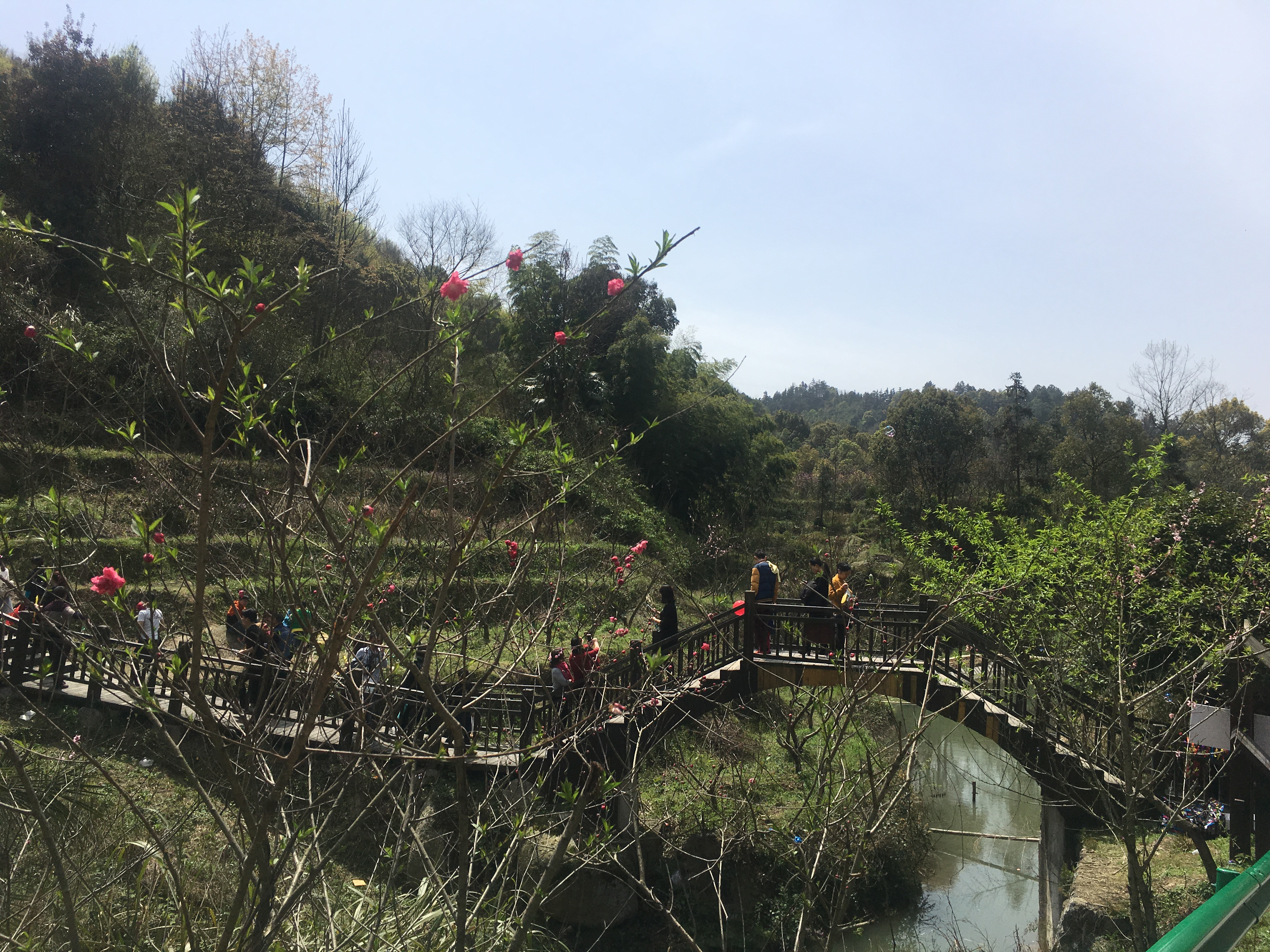
A bridge over a stream in Peace Valley of Mount Dongwu in Huitang Town.

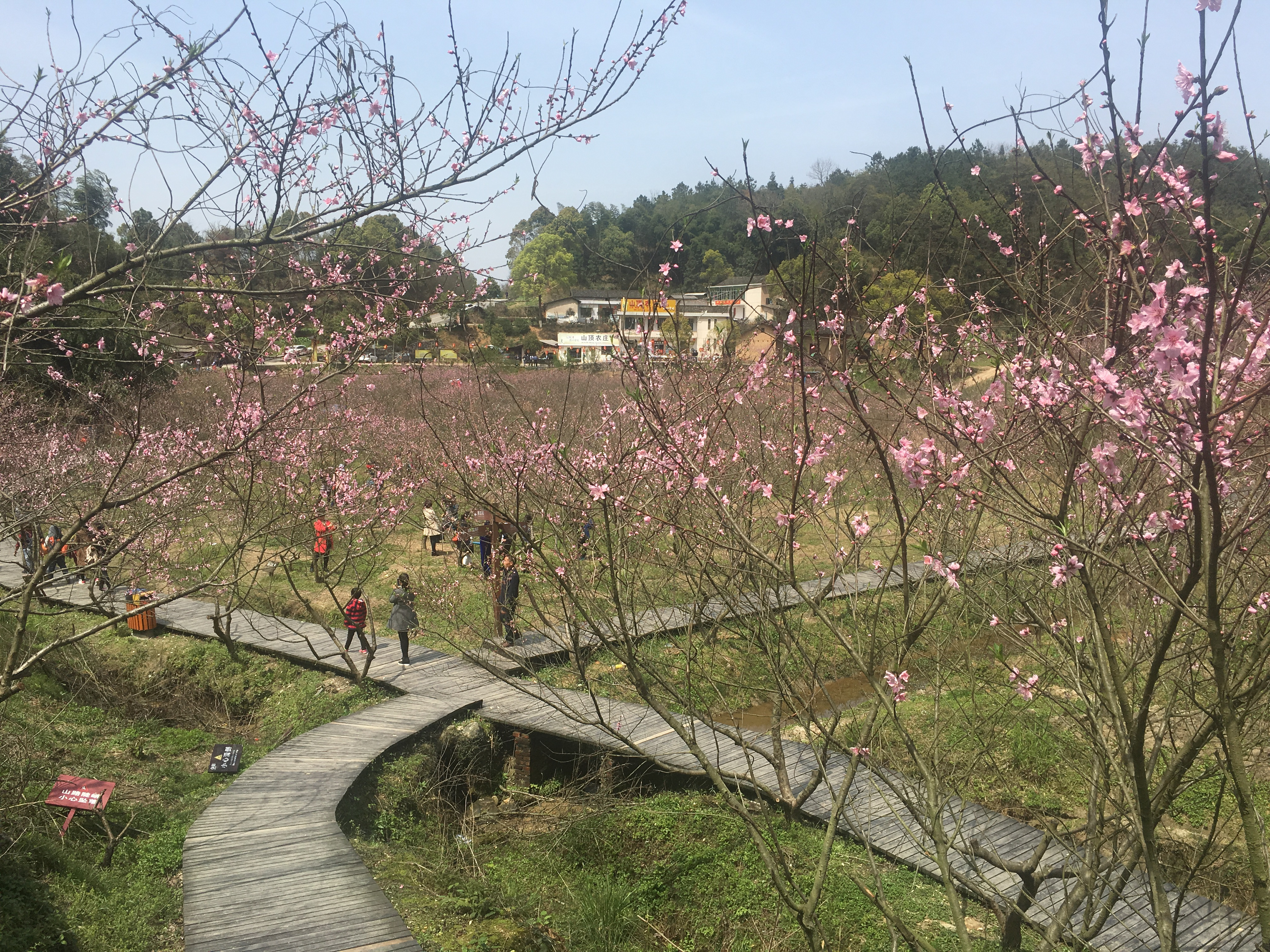
Peace Valley of Mount Dongwu in Huitang Town.

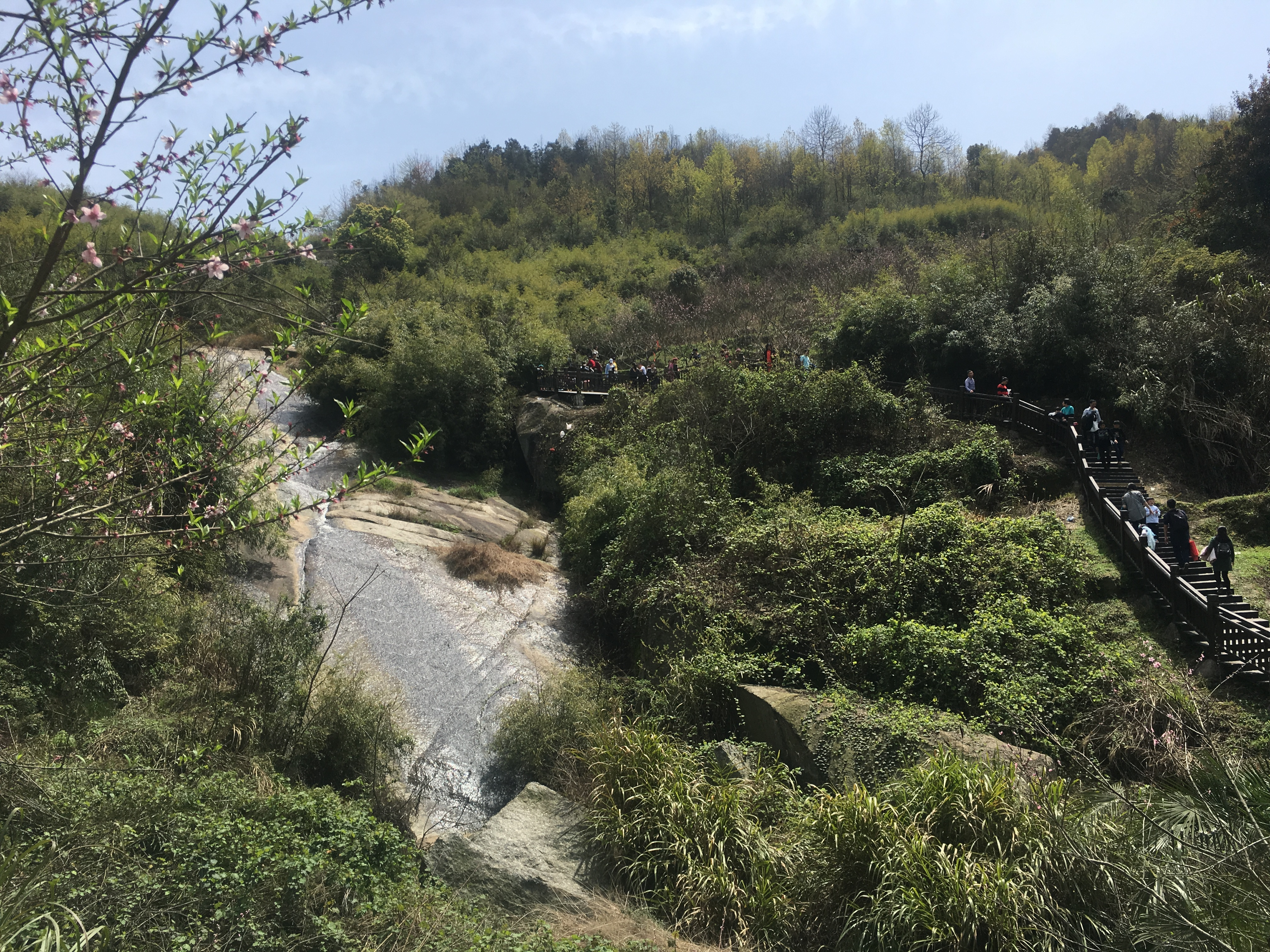
Peace Valley of Mount Dongwu in Huitang Town.

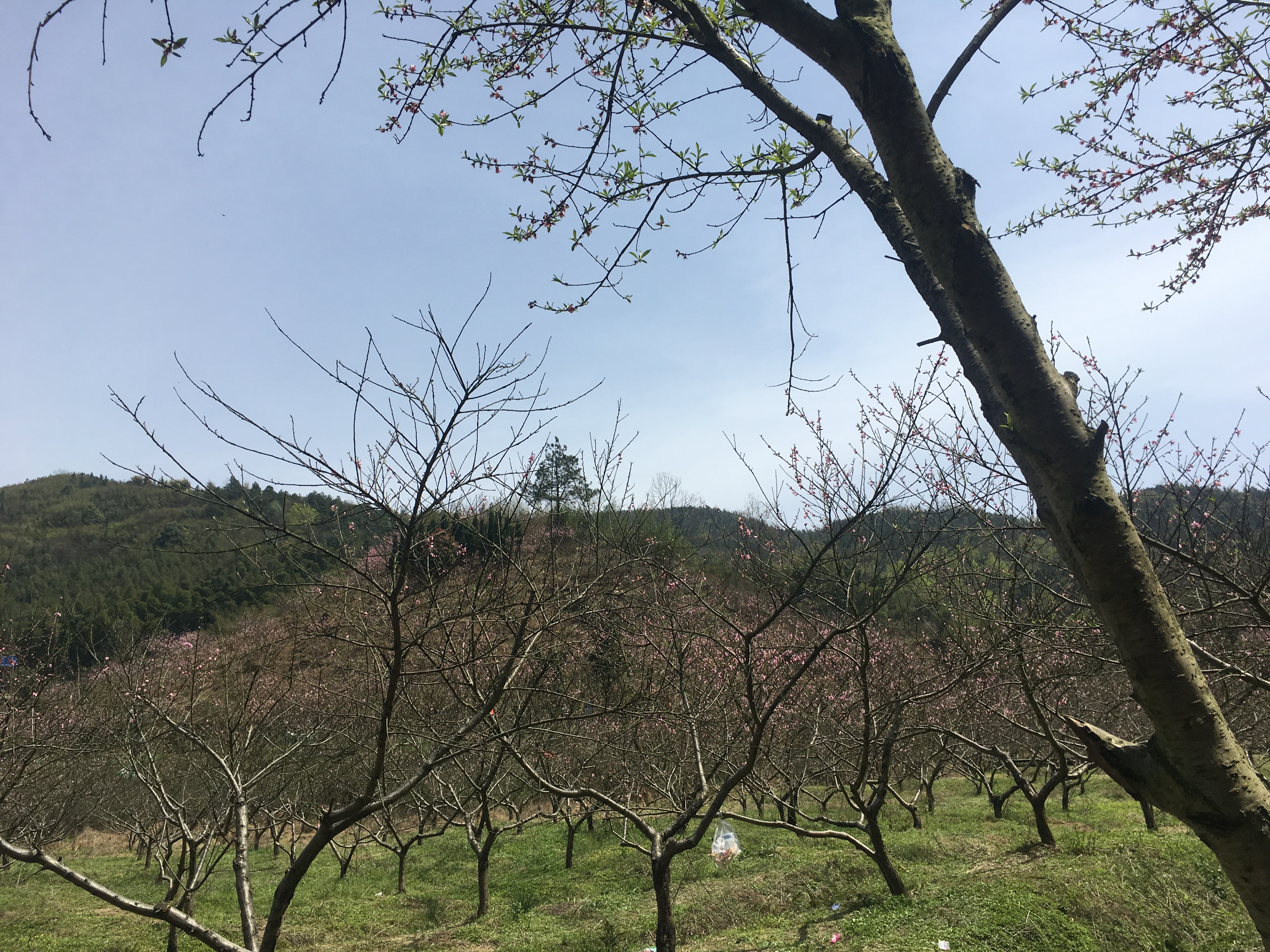
Peace Valley of Mount Dongwu in Huitang Town

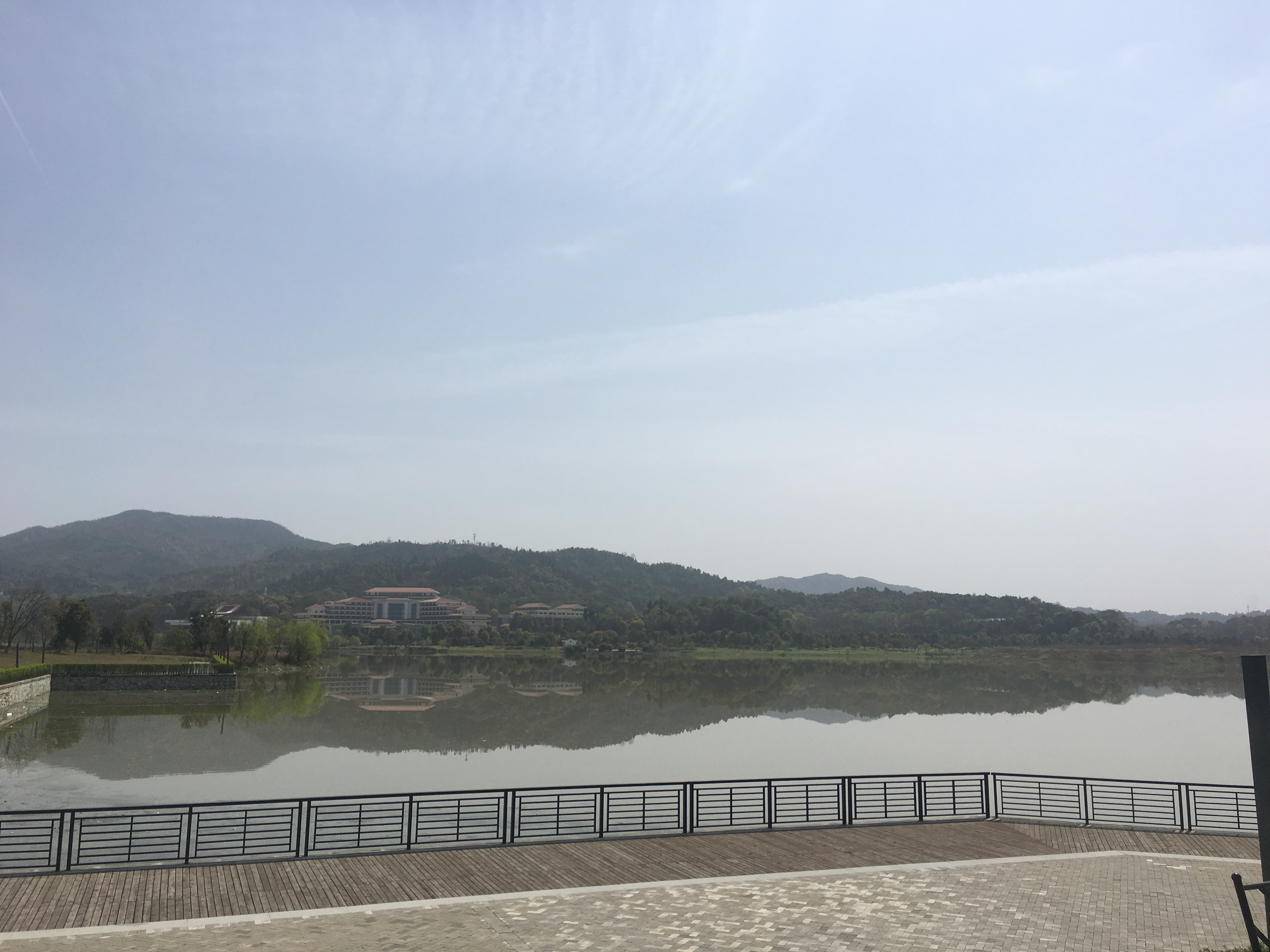
A man-made lake in front of Zilongwan Hot Spring Resort in Huitang Town.

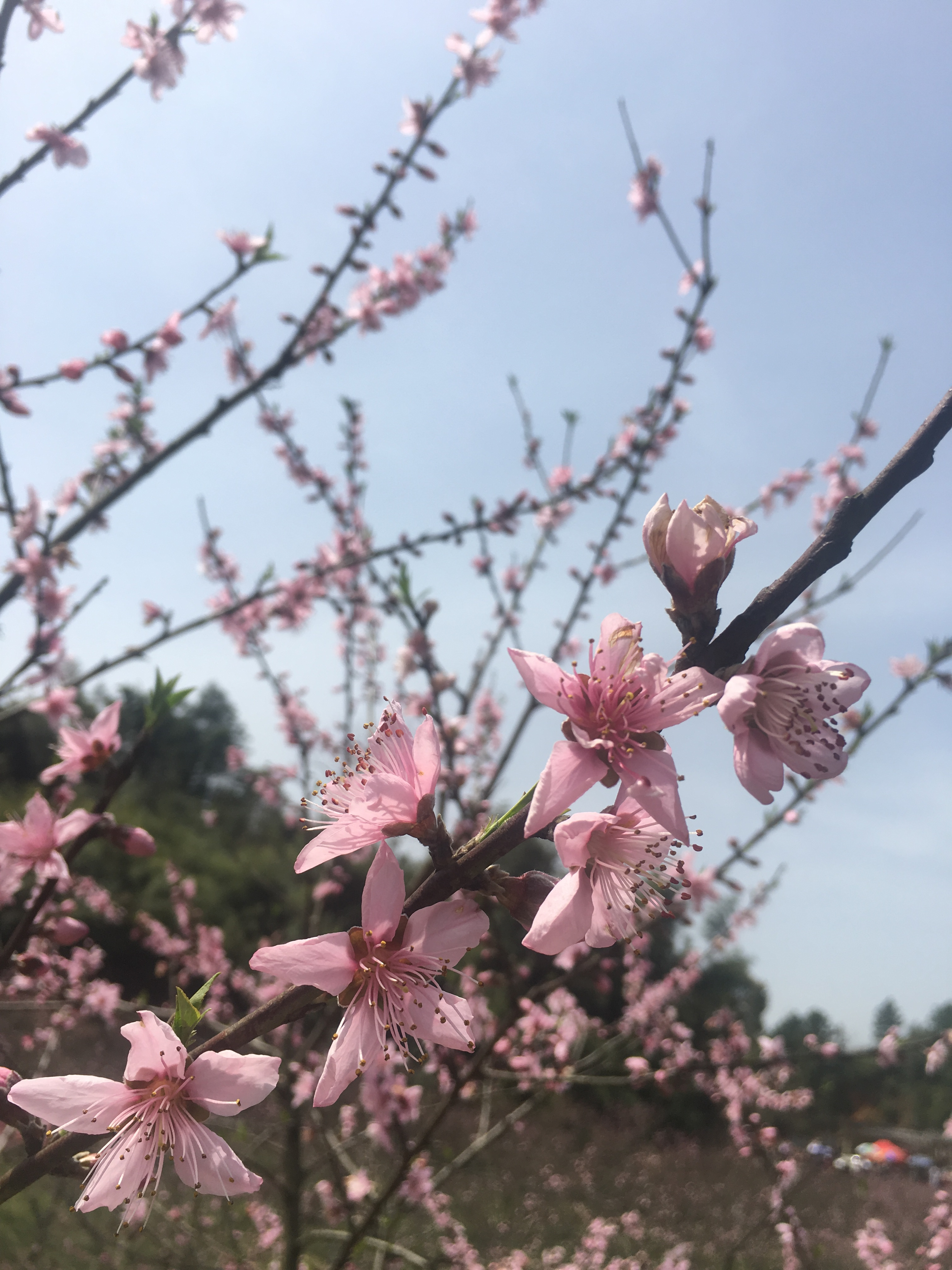
Pink Peach Tree in Blossom in Peach Valley.

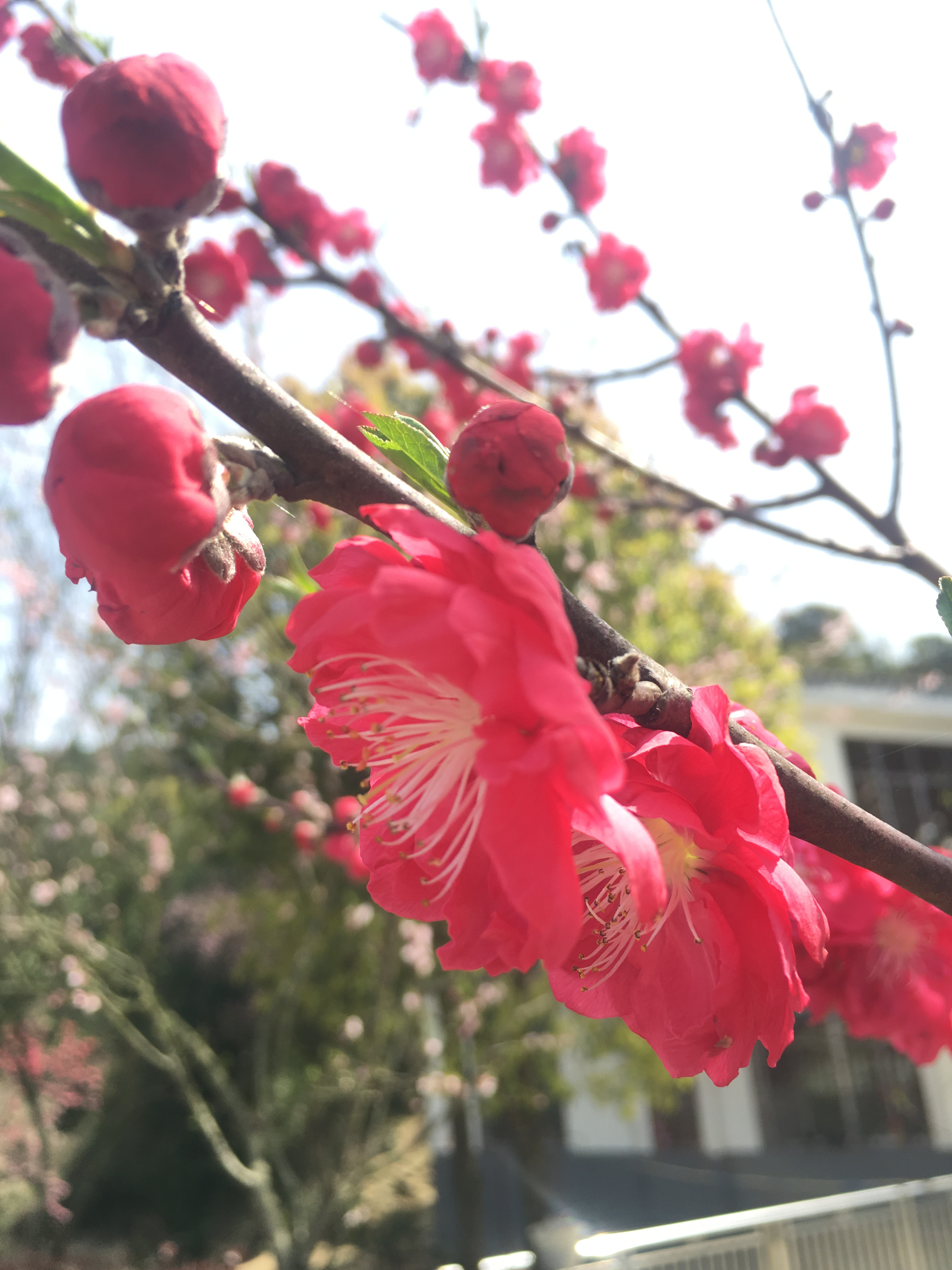
Red Peach Tree in Blossom in Peach Valley.
