= Datunying =

Datunying Town 大屯营镇
- Town
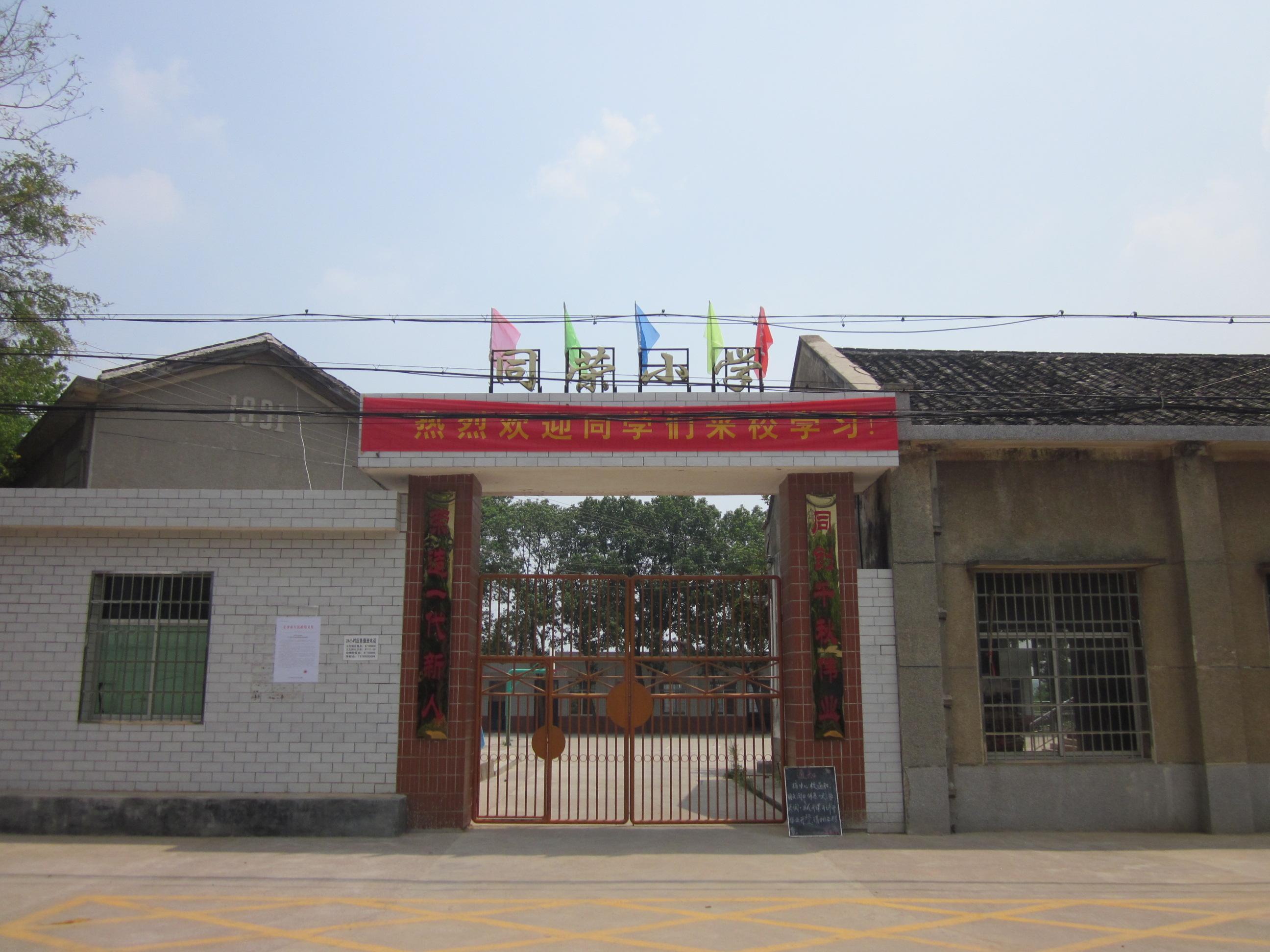

- Location in Hunan
- Coordinates: 27°58′30″N 112°39′28″E
- Country: People's Republic of China
- Province: Hunan
- Prefecture-level city: Changsha
- County-level city: Ningxiang City

Area
  - Total: 106.2 km^{2} (41.0 sq mi)

Population
  - Total: 43,000
  - Density: 400/km^{2} (1,000/sq mi)
- Time zone: UTC+08:00 (China Standard)
- Postal code: 410617
- Area code: 0731
- Website: www.nxcity.gov.cn/dtyz/index.htm

Chinese name
- Traditional Chinese: 大屯營鎮
- Simplified Chinese: 大屯营镇
Transcriptions
Standard Mandarin
- Hanyu Pinyin: Dàtúnyíng Zhèn

Datunying (Chinese: 大屯营镇) is a rural town in Ningxiang City, Hunan Province, China. It is surrounded by Huaminglou Town on the north, Daolin Town on the east, and Shaoshan City on the southwest. As of the 2000 census, it had a population of 39,819 and an area of 106.2 square kilometres (41.0 sq mi).

== Administrative divisions ==
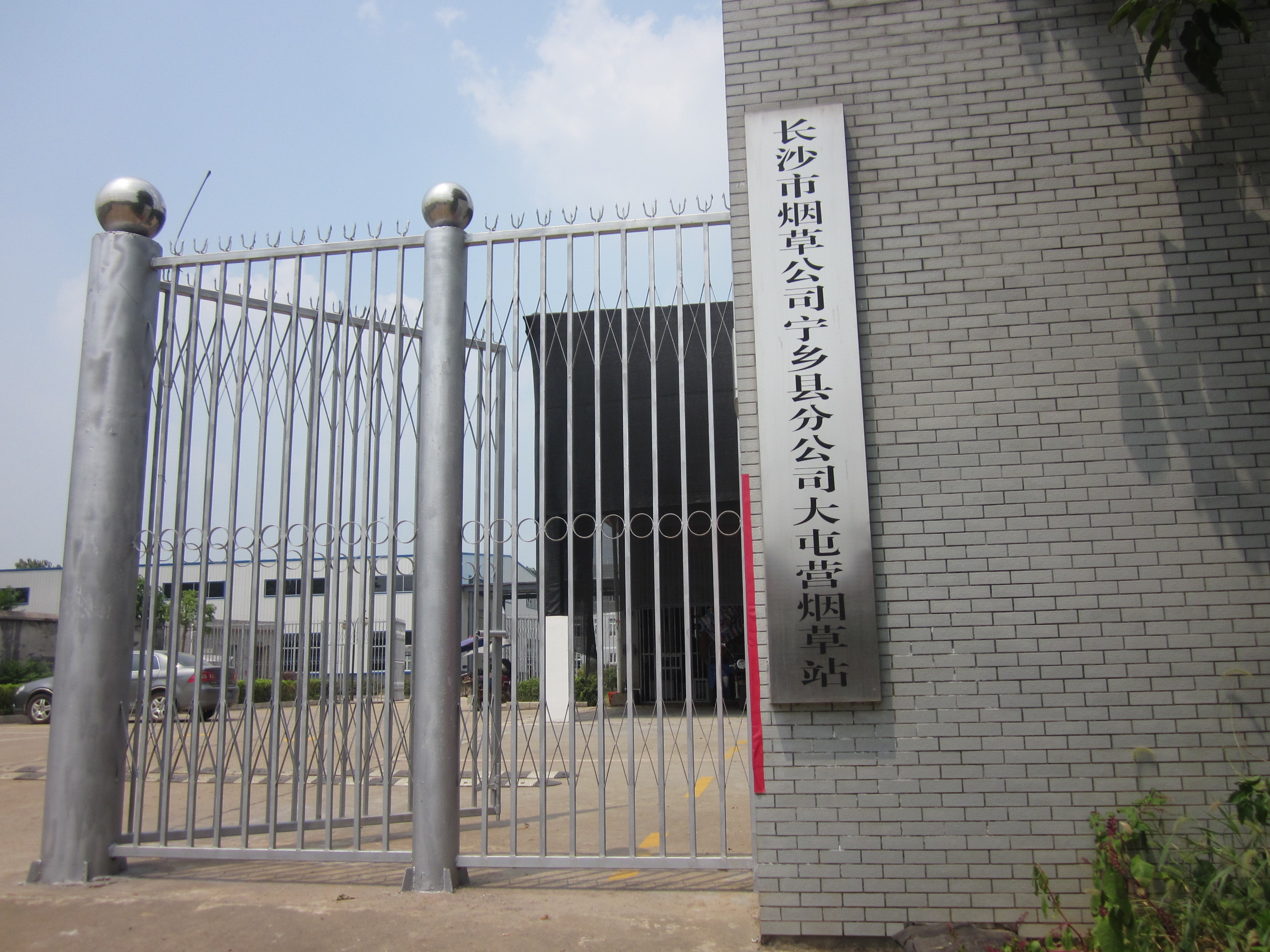
Datunying Town.

The town is divided into one community and six villages:

- Shijiawan Community (石家湾社区)
- Jinxing (靳兴村)
- Datunying (大屯营村)
- Baiyang (白洋村)
- Shaoguang (韶光村)
- Meihu (梅湖村)
- Sanxianao (三仙坳村)

== Geography ==
The Jin River, a tributary of the Xiang River, flows through the town.

== Economy ==
Tea and tobacco are important to the economy.

== Education ==
There is one senior high school located with the town limits: Ningxiang Ninth Senior High School (宁乡九中).

== Culture ==
Huaguxi is the most influential local theater.

== Transportation ==
=== County Road ===
The County Roads X089 and X217 pass across the town.

=== Expressway ===
The Shaoshan Expressway passes north through Datunying Town.

=== Railway ===
The Shanghai–Kunming high-speed railway passes through the town east to west.

== Celebrity ==
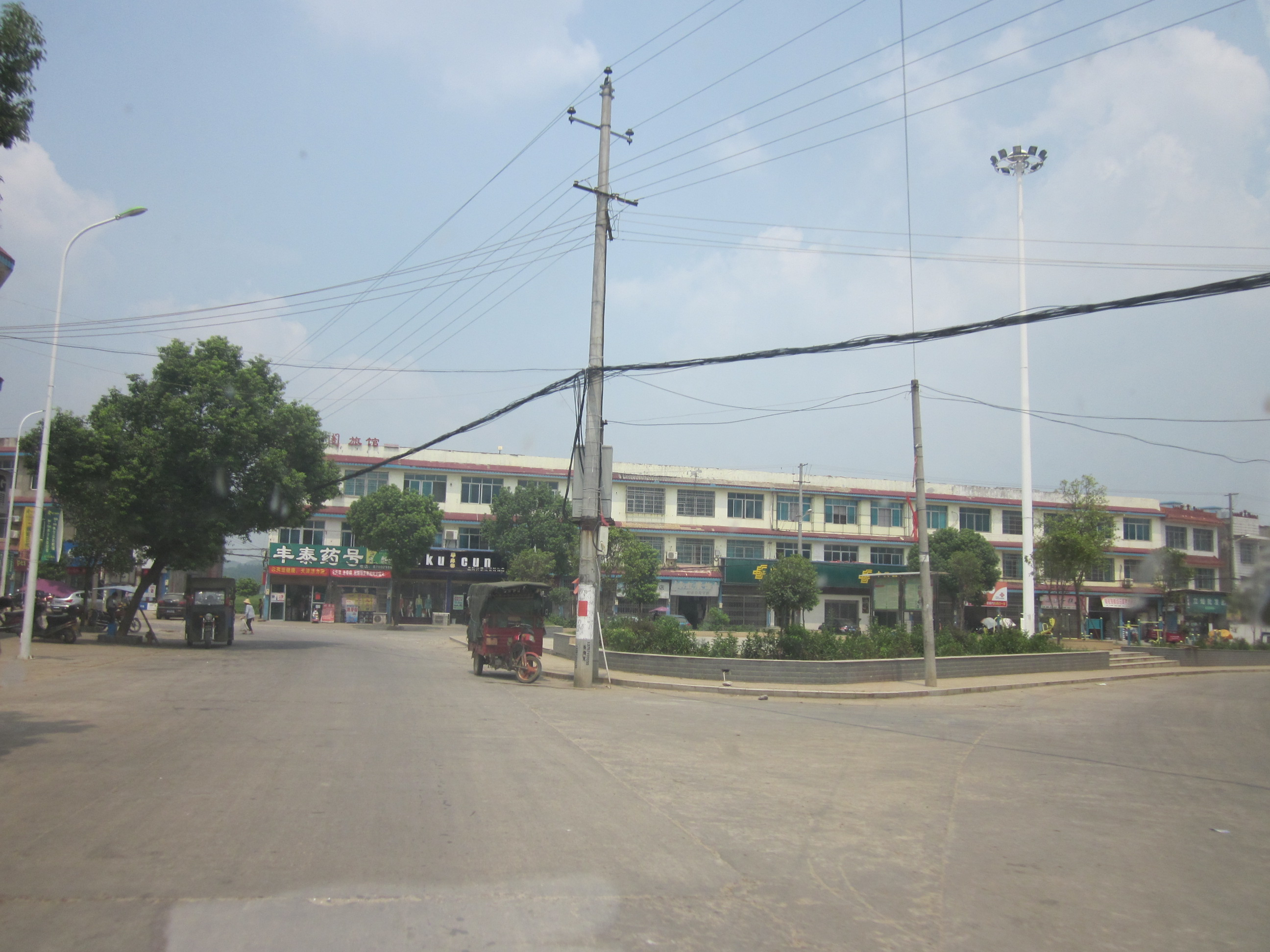
Datunying Town.

- Ouyang Qin (simplified Chinese: 欧阳钦; traditional Chinese: 歐陽欽; pinyin: Oūyáng Qīn,1900–1978), politician.
- Zhou Dawu (simplified Chinese: 周达武; traditional Chinese: 周達武; pinyin: Zhōu Dáwǔ), general.
- Zhu Jianfan (simplified Chinese: 朱剑凡; traditional Chinese: 朱劍凡; pinyin: Zhū Jiànfán,1883–1932), educator.
- Cheng Wenshan (Chinese: 成文山); 1929–2008), educator.
