= Hedong Reservoir =

- 合东水库 (Chinese)
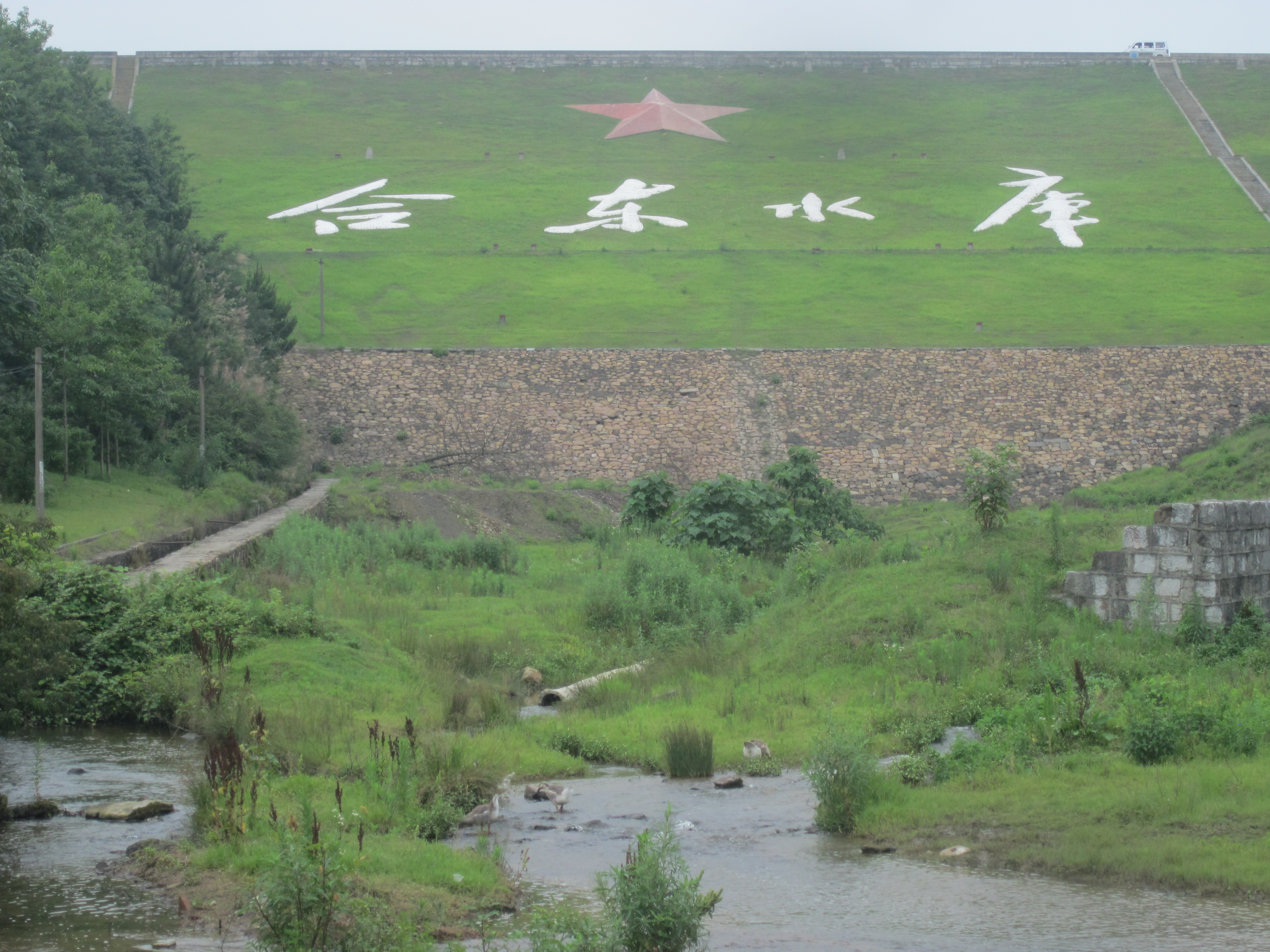
- Frontal view of the dam of Hedong Reservoir.

- Location within Hunan
- Location: Hutian Town, Xiangxiang, Hunan, China
- Coordinates: 27°53′47″N 112°02′32″E
- Type: Reservoir
- Basin countries: China
- Built: 1970s
- First flooded: 1970s
- Surface area: 2.07 square kilometres (510 acres)
- Max. depth: 186.2 m (611 ft)
- Water volume: 2,800,000 m^{3} (0.00067 cu mi)

Hedong Reservoir (simplified Chinese: 合东水库; traditional Chinese: 合東水庫; pinyin: Hédōng Shuǐkù) is a medium-sized reservoir in Hutian Town, Xiangxiang, Hunan, China. It covers a total surface area of 2.07 square kilometres (510 acres). Its drainage basin is about 4,000 km^{2} (1,500 sq mi), and it can hold up to 2,800,000 m^{3} (0.00067 cu mi) of water at full capacity. It is the largest body of water and the largest freshwater lake in Hutian Town.

== Dam ==
The dam is 39 m (128 ft) high.

== Function ==
Hedong Reservoir belongs to the first grade water source protection area (一级水源保护区) and is part of Xiangxiang's water supply network.

The reservoir provides drinking water and water for irrigation and recreational activities.

== Public Access ==
Hedong Reservoir open to visitors for free. Fishing and hiking are activities around the reservoir.

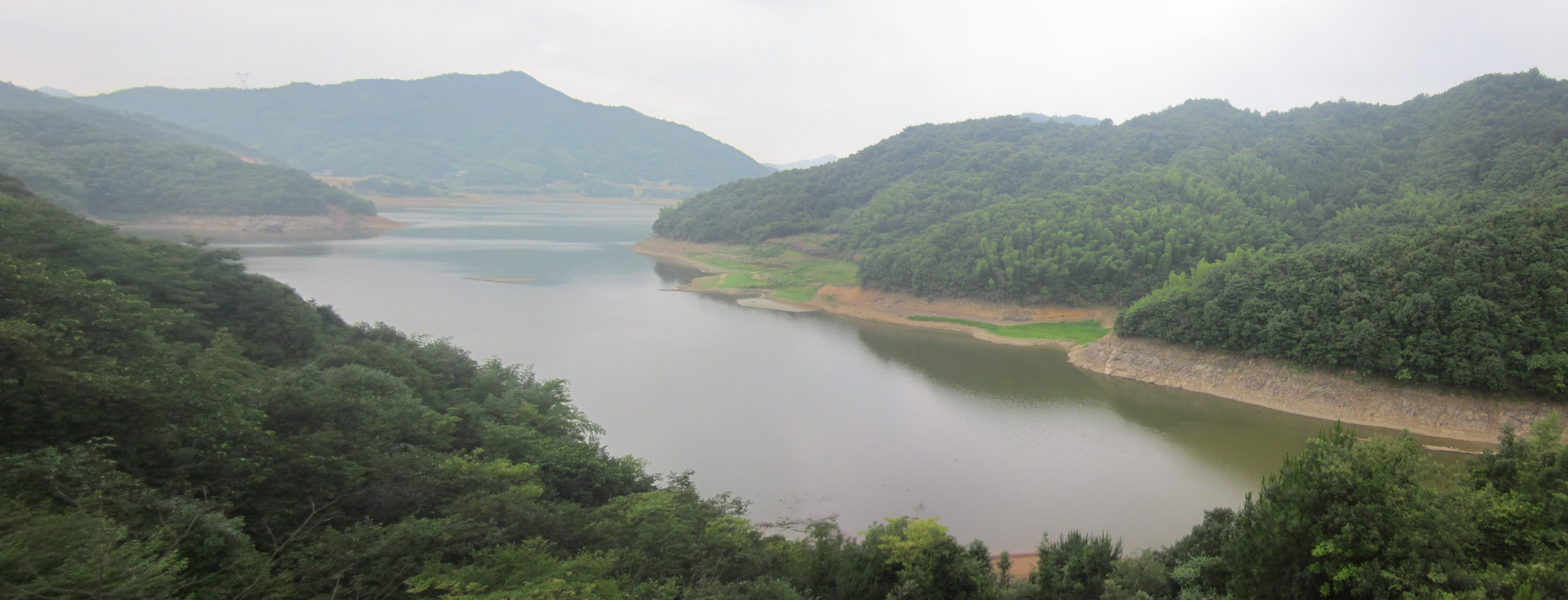
Hedong Reservoir.
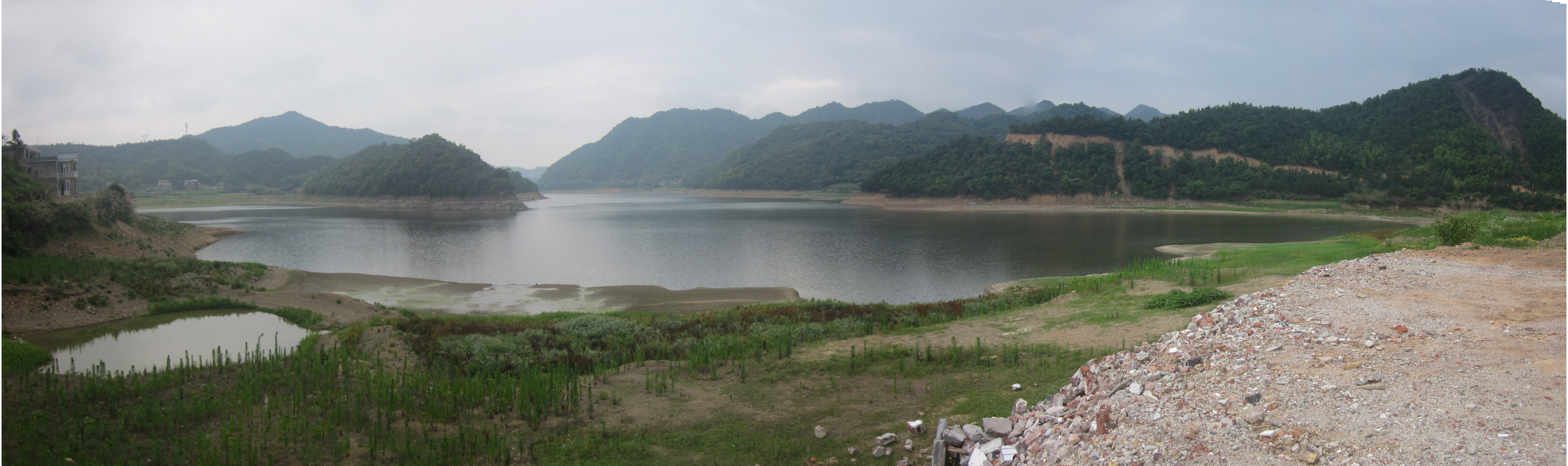
Panorama of Hedong Reservoir.
