= Tao Runai =

- 陶汝鼐
- Born: 1601; Huangminglou Town, Ningxiang, Hunan, Ming China
- Died: 1683 (aged 81–82); Ningxiang, Hunan, Qing China
- Other names: Zhongtiao (仲调); Xieyou (燮友); Mi'an (密庵); Shixinong (石溪农); Rentoutuo (忍头陀)
- Education: Student of the Guozijian (1629)
- Occupations: Official, scholar, calligrapher, Buddhist monk
- Notable work: Collections of Tao Runai
- Movement: Resisting the Qing conquest of China

Tao Runai (Chinese: 陶汝鼐; pinyin: Táo Rǔnaì; 1601 - 1683), courtesy name Zhongtiao (仲調) and Xieyou (燮友), art name Mi'an (密庵) and Shixinong (石溪農), dharma name Rentoutuo (忍头陀), was a Chinese official, scholar, calligrapher and Buddhist monk who resisted the Qing conquest of China in the 17th century. He spent most of his life during the Manchu conquest of China and anti-Qing activities after the Ming dynasty had been overthrown.

== Biography ==
Tao was born in Huangminglou Town of Ningxiang, Hunan in 1601. In 1629 he entered Guozijian, the highest institution of traditional Chinese culture in China. After graduation, he became an official in south China's Guangdong province. In 1644, after the Ming dynasty (1368–1644) had been overthrown, Zhu Yousong built his capital at Nanjing and named his new regime "Hongguang", Tao went to join the Southern Ming dynasty (1644–1645). But the new country has only one year to exist, Tao had to go to Guangxi and served as an official in the Yongli Regime (1646–1661). After the collapse of Yongli Regime, he received ordination as a monk in Miyin Temple, Weishan Township. He had a dharma name "Rentoutuo" (忍头陀, means a patient monk).

== Work ==
- 陶汝鼐集 [Collections of Tao Runai] (in Chinese). Changsha, Hunan: Yuelu Shushe. 2008-11-01. ISBN 9787807610649.
