= Former Residence of Liu Shaoqi =

Historical site

- 刘少奇故居
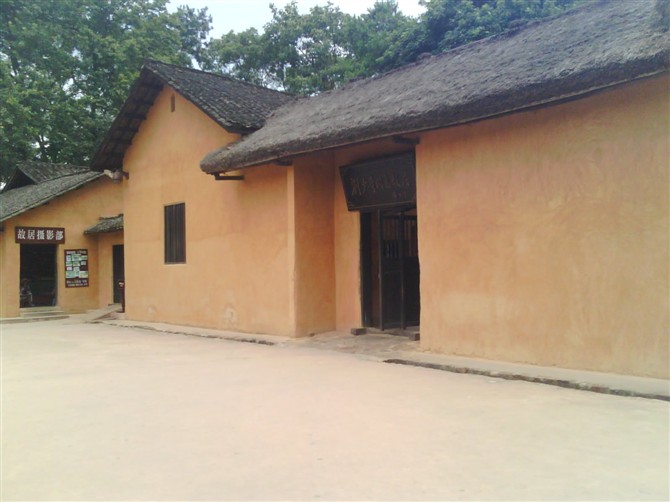
- Former Residence of Liu Shaoqi

- Location within Hunan Location within China

General information
- Type: Traditional folk houses
- Location: Huaminglou Town, Ningxiang City, Hunan Province, China
- Coordinates: 28°01′56″N 112°38′44″E
- Completed: 1796
- Opened: 1959
- Owner: Government of Ningxiang

Technical details
- Floor area: 20,000-square-metre (220,000 sq ft)
- Grounds: 4,000,000-square-metre (43,000,000 sq ft)

The Former Residence of Liu Shaoqi or Liu Shaoqi's Former Residence (simplified Chinese: 刘少奇故居; traditional Chinese: 劉少奇故居; pinyin: Liú Shàoqí Gùjū) was built in the late Qing Dynasty (1644–1911). It is located in Huaminglou Town of Ningxiang, Hunan, China. It has an area of about 4,000,000 square metres (43,000,000 sq ft) and a building area of about 20,000 square metres (220,000 sq ft), embodies buildings such as the old houses, the Liu Shaoqi Memorial Hall, the Bronze Statue of Liu Shaoqi, the Cultural relics Exhibition Hall.

== History ==
In 1796, in the first year of the age of the Jiaqing Emperor, it was built by one of Liu Shaoqi's ancestors.

In 1898, Liu Shaoqi was born here.

On its opening late in 1959, it was listed as a "Historical and Cultural Sites Protected at the Provincial Level".

In May 1961, Chinese President Liu Shaoqi and his wife, first lady Wang Guangmei returned to Hunan and they lived here. During the Great Leap Forward, Liu Shaoqi handed out their own daily necessities to farmers.

In 1966, during the Cultural Revolution, the house was broken down by the Red Guards and the cultural relics were stolen. On October 1, 1966, the site was closed.

In February 1980, President Liu Shaoqi was rehabilitated. The People's Government of Hunan Province and the People's Government of Ningxiang rebuilt the house. On March 5, it was opened to the public again.

In 1982, China's leader Deng Xiaoping wrote "Liu Shao-qi's Former Residence" on the horizontal tablet.

In January 1988, it was listed as a "Major Historical and Cultural Site Protected at the National Level" by the State Council of China.

== Gallery ==
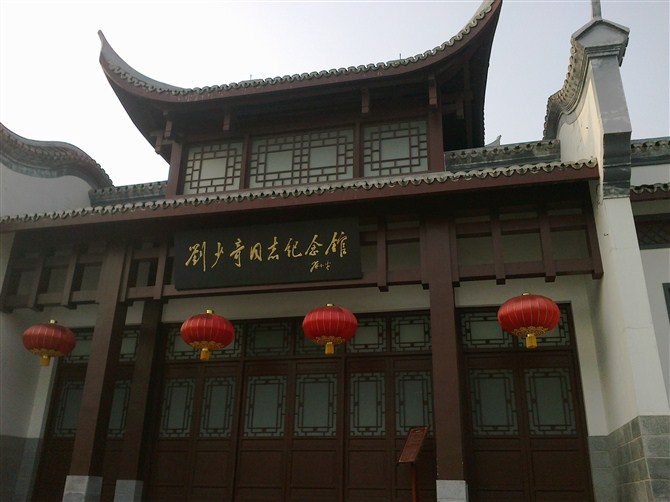
The Liu Shaoqi Memorial Hall.

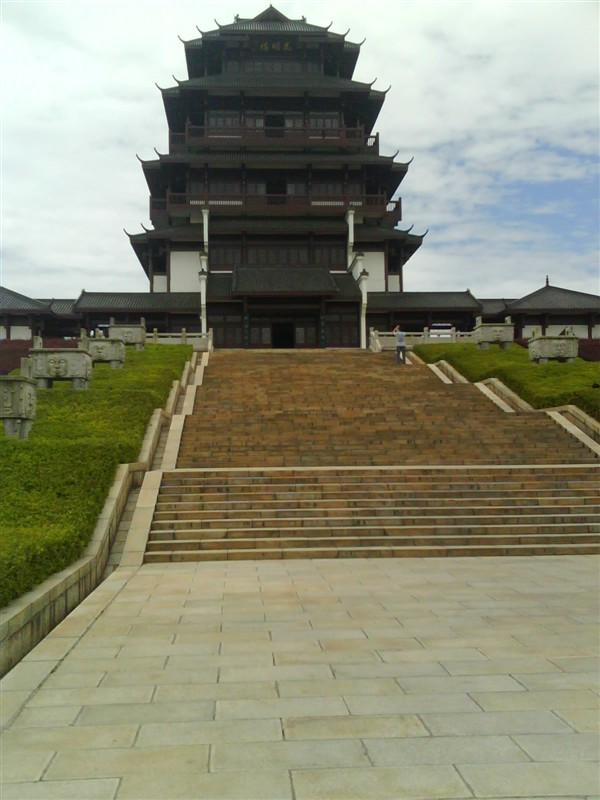
The Huaming Tower.

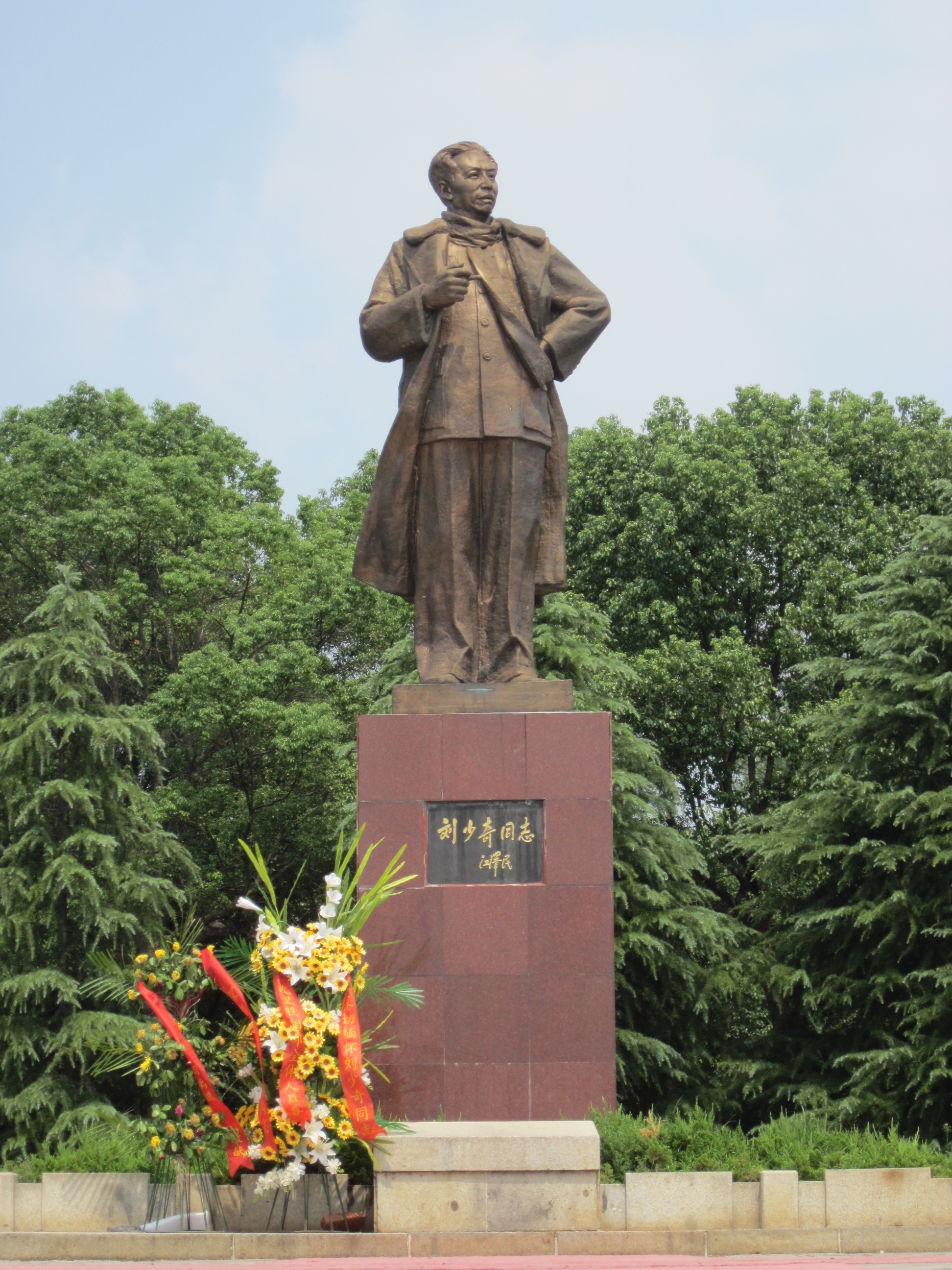
Bronze statue of Liu Shaoqi.

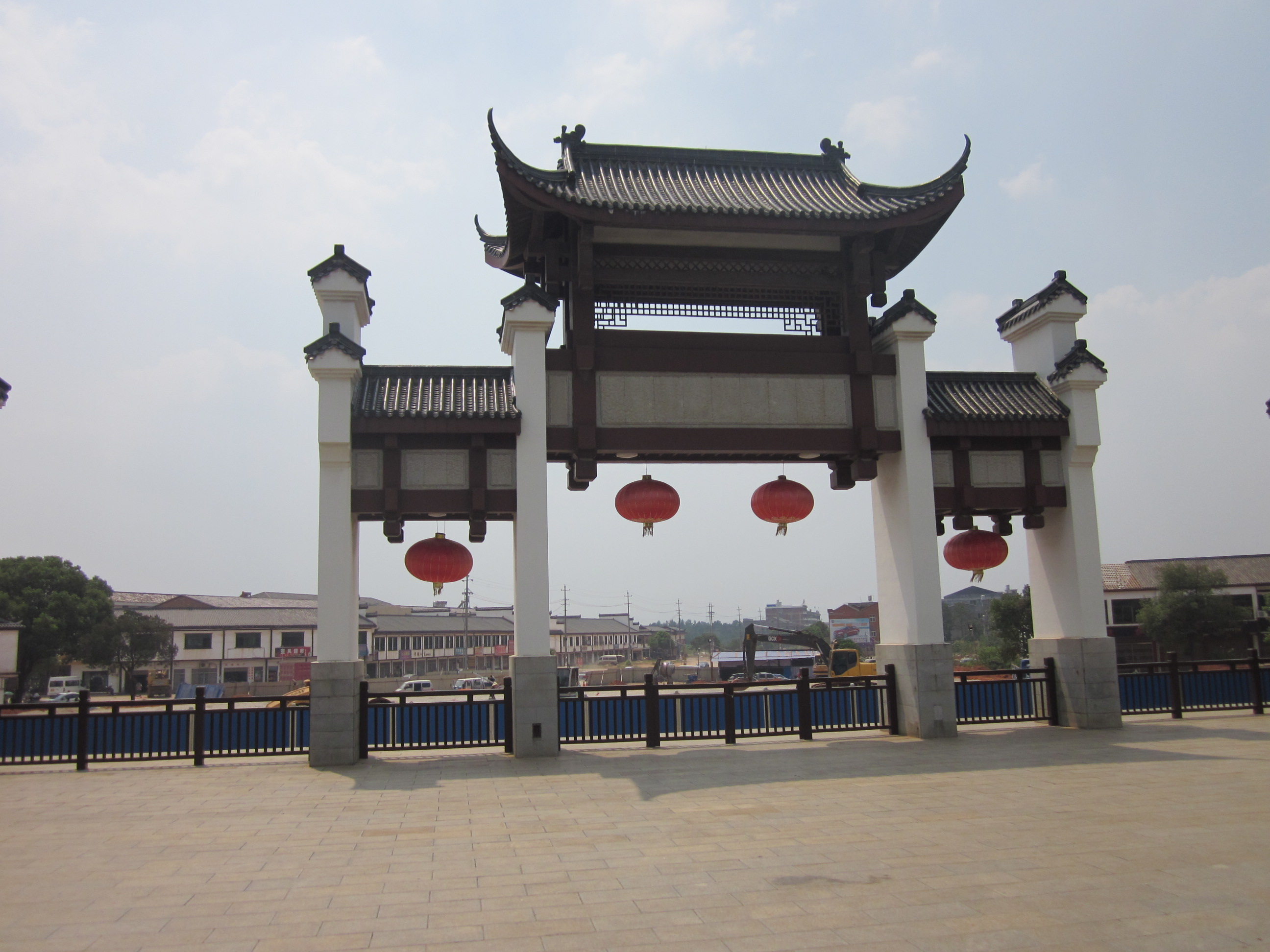
Paifang at the Former Residence of Liu Shaoqi.
