= Changsha–Shaoshan–Loudi Expressway =

Road in Hunan, China

Changsha–Shaoshan–Loudi Expressway
- 上海－重庆高速公路
- Changshaolou Expressway 长韶娄高速公路

Route information
- Length: 139.151 km (86.464 mi)
- Existed: December 31, 2014–present

Location
- Country: China

Highway system
- National Trunk Highway System; Primary; Auxiliary; National Highways; Transport in China

Changsha–Shaoshan–Loudi Expressway
- Traditional Chinese: 長沙韶山婁底高速公路
- Simplified Chinese: 长沙韶山娄底高速公路
Transcriptions
Standard Mandarin
- Hanyu Pinyin: Chángshā Sháoshān Lóudǐ Gāosù Gōnglù

Alternative Chinese name
- Traditional Chinese: 長韶婁高速公路
- Simplified Chinese: 长韶娄高速公路
Transcriptions
Standard Mandarin
- Hanyu Pinyin: Chángsháolóu Gāosù Gōnglù

The Changsha-Shaoshan-Loudi Expressway (Chinese: 长沙韶山娄底高速公路; pinyin: Chángshā Sháoshān Lóudǐ Gāosù Gōnglù) commonly abbreviated as Changshaolou Expressway (Chinese: 长韶娄高速公路), is a major expressway of Hunan province, China, linking the cities of Changsha, Shaoshan, Xiangxiang, Loudi, and Lianyuan. It is 139.151 km in length.

== Route ==
The expressway passes the following major cities:

- Yuelu District, Changsha
- Ningxiang
- Shaoshan
- Xiangxiang
- Louxing District, Loudi
- Lianyuan

== Scenic spots ==
- Yuelu Mountain and Yuelu Academy
- Liu Shaoqi's Former Residence
- Huitang Hot Spring
- Mao Zedong's Former Residence
