= Yueshan, Xiangxiang =

Yueshan Town 月山镇
- Town
- Location in Hunan
- Coordinates: 27°51′41″N 112°17′28″E
- Country: People's Republic of China
- Province: Hunan
- Prefecture-level city: Xiangtan
- County-level city: Xiangxiang

Area
  - Total: 146.5 km^{2} (56.6 sq mi)

Population
  - Total: 69,880
  - Density: 477.0/km^{2} (1,235/sq mi)
- Time zone: UTC+8 (China Standard)
- Postal code: 411400
- Area code: 0732

Yueshan Town (simplified Chinese: 月山镇; traditional Chinese: 月山鎮; pinyin: Yuèshān Zhèn) is an urban town in Xiangxiang City, Hunan Province, People's Republic of China.

== Cityscape ==
The town is divided into 58 villages and two communities, which include the following areas:

- Baishushan Community
- Tanshushan Community
- Litouqiao Village
- Baozhong Village
- Qianjin Village
- Shengli Village
- Sanwan Village
- Anchong Village
- Baolong Village
- Baoping Village
- Baolu Village
- Bailong Village
- Xilin Village
- Zixalin Village Jinping Village
- Jinshan Village
- Shanfeng Village
- Malong Village
- Tianxin Village
- Nanyue Village
- Longchong Village
- Pengshan Village
- Lingyang Village
- Shuanglong Village
- Hechong Village
- Dongzhu Village
- Zizhu Village
- Lizi Village
- Hongri Village
- Yingshi Village
- Dongkou Village
- Siqian Village
- Yueshan Village
- Baifeng Village
- Baihe Village
- Hongguang Village
- Taishan Village
- Fengshan Village
- Hongmei Village
- Fengyu Village
- Yunnan Village
- Shiqiaoshi Village
- Shifo Village
- Qingping Village
- Huangtukan Village
- Hengjiang Village
- Xinqiao Village
- Hongyang Village
- Jiangdong Village
- Jiangtian Village
- Qunle Village
- Shuikou Village
- Nanmu Village
- Shixi Village
- Yuntian Village
- Shizhu Village
- Dongfeng Village
- Jianlouping Village
- Shitoupu Village
- Dongkouba Village
- Shiji Village
