= Ningxiang High-tech Industrial Park =

Industrial park in Ningxiang, China

Ningxiang High-tech Industrial Park (Chinese: 宁乡高新技术产业园区) is a High tech industrial park at province level in Ningxiang City, Hunan Province, China. It is the original Jinzhou New Urban Area Industrial Concentration District (Chinese: 金洲新区工业集中区) created in 2006; it is usually referred to as "Jinzhou New Urban Area" (Chinese: 金洲新区) for short. It was approved to an industrial district at province level in 2012, and it was upgraded to a hi-tech industrial park at province-level on 26 May 2015. Its core area is in Jinzhou Town, the industrial park is a part of the core zone of Xiangjiang New Area. It has a planned area of 65 square kilometres (25 sq mi). As of 2015 it also has a builtup area of 13 square kilometres (5.0 sq mi).

In 2015, its gross output value of industries is CNY 68.5 billion (US$11 billion), the added value of scale-sized industries is 15.89 billion yuan (US$2.55 billion). In industrial projects, 158 of projects have been completed and put into use since its establishment.

== Geography ==
Ningxiang High-tech Industrial Park is located to the east of the county seat, adjacent to the west of Wangcheng District. It covers most of Jingzhou Town, parts of Gaoxin village (高新村) of Xiaduopu Town, parts of Ziyun (紫云村) and Qunxing (群星村) villages of Lijingpu Town. According to its Development Planning, the planned area is located between Shichang Railway and National Highway 319, its east is extended down to the boundary of Wangcheng District, to the west it is bordered by Lijingpu and Shuangjiangkou Towns.
