= Jinzhou, Ningxiang =

Jinzhou Town 金洲镇
- Town
- Location in Hunan
- Coordinates: 28°17′10″N 112°39′14″E
- Country: People's Republic of China
- Province: Hunan
- Prefecture-level city: Changsha
- County-level city: Ningxiang

Area
  - Total: 62.1 km^{2} (24.0 sq mi)

Population
  - Total: 31,000
  - Density: 500/km^{2} (1,300/sq mi)
- Time zone: UTC+08:00 (China Standard)
- Postal code: 410604
- Area code: 0731

Chinese name
- Traditional Chinese: 金洲鎮
- Simplified Chinese: 金洲镇
Transcriptions
Standard Mandarin
- Hanyu Pinyin: Jīnzhōu Zhèn

Jinzhou Town (Chinese: 金洲镇) is a rural town in Ningxiang City, Hunan Province, China. It is surrounded by Shuangjiangkou Town to the northwest, Wushan Subdistrict to the east, Lijingpu Subdistrict to the west, and Xiaduopu Town to the south. As of the 2000 census it had a population of 27,223 and an area of 62.1 square kilometres (24.0 sq mi). It is home of Jinzhou New Urban Area.

== Administrative division ==
The town is divided into four villages and two communities:

- Guanshan Community (关山社区)
- Quanmin Community (全民社区)
- Tongxing (同兴村)
- Jianlou (箭楼村)
- Yantang (颜塘村)
- Longqiao (龙桥村)

== Geography ==
The Wei River flows through the town.

== Culture ==
Huaguxi is the most influential local theater.

== Transportation ==
The Jinzhou Highway (金洲大道) runs from Yutan Subdistrict through Chengjiao Subdistrict, Shuangjiangkou Town and Jinzhou Town to Changsha City in the Yuelu District.

The G5513 Changsha-Zhangjiajie Expressway runs southeast to Wangcheng District of Changsha, and the northwest through Chengjiao Subdistrict to Heshan District of Yiyang.

== Attractions ==
The Mount Guan Ancient Town (关山古镇) is a famous tourist attraction.
