= Ningxiang Economic and Technological Development Zone =

Area of Ningxiang, Hunan, China

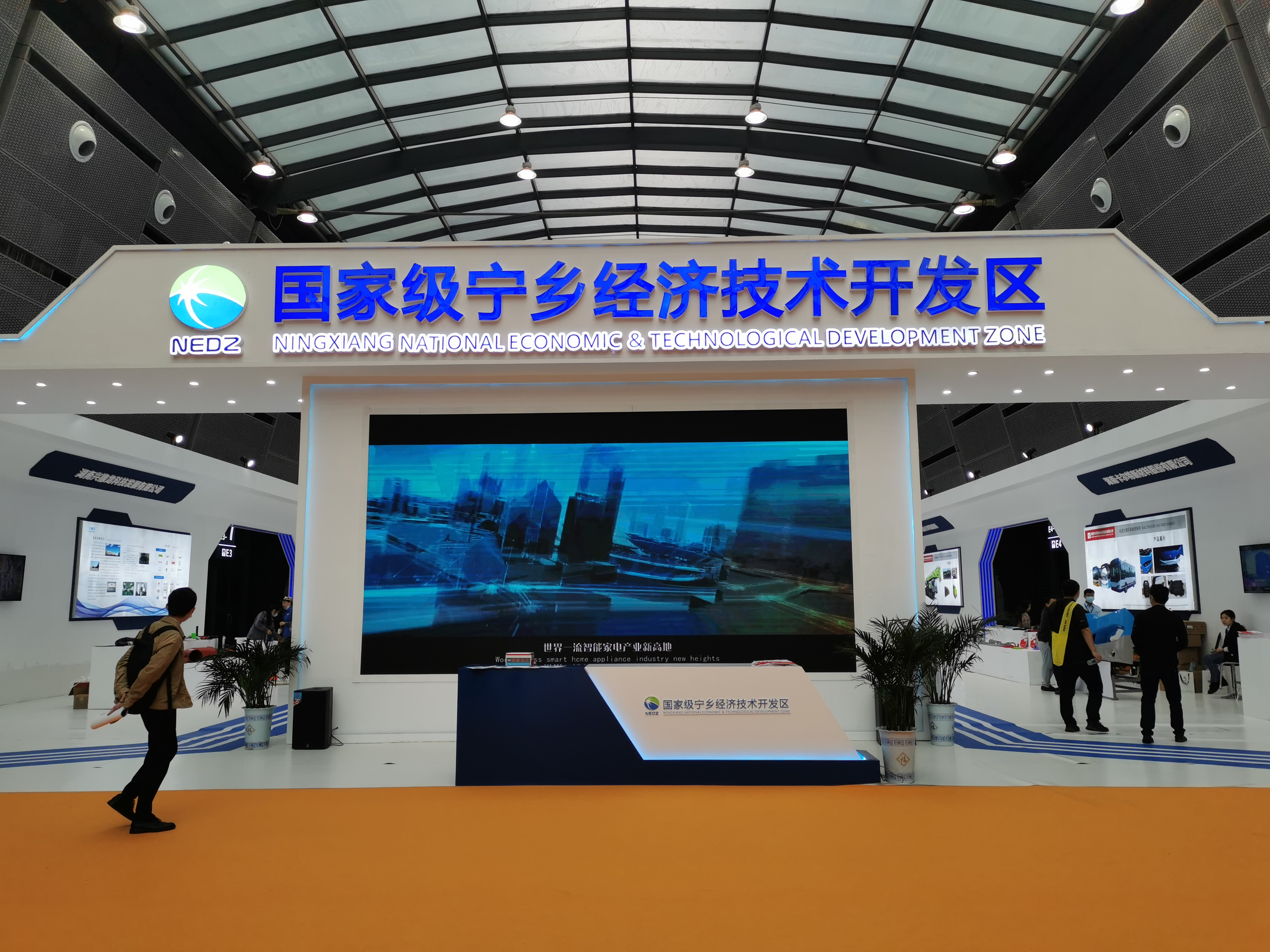
Am exhibition area

Ningxiang Economic and Technological Development Zone (simplified Chinese: 宁乡经济技术开发区; traditional Chinese: 寧鄉經濟技術開發區; pinyin: Níngxiāng Jīngjì Jìshù Kāifāqū; abbr: NETZ) is an economic and technical development zone (ETZ) in Ningxiang City, Hunan Province, China, one of four ETZs at state level in Changsha. It is the original Ningxiang Private Economy Industrial Park (Chinese: 宁乡县民营经济园) created on 16 February, 1998, renamed to Ningxiang Technological Industrial Park (Chinese: 宁乡科技工业园) in March, 2000. On 4 November, 2002, it was formally renamed to the present name, and approved to an ETZ at provincial level. On 11 November, 2010, it was upgraded to an ETZ at state level. As of 2016, its builtup area covers 25 km^{2} (9.7 sq mi), the total gross output of scale-sized industries hits 97.07 billion yuan (US$ 14.61 billion).

At the beginning of its establishment, the planned area was 3 km^{2} (1.2 sq mi), it expanded to 25 km^{2} (9.7 sq mi) in 2009, the intermediate planning area of the zone is 60 km^{2} (23 sq mi) and 150 km^{2} (58 sq mi) of its future planning area. The plan control areas of Ningxiang ETZ consists of parts of Chengjiao, Shuangjiangkou and Jinghuapu, of which are 10 villages (or communities) of Chengjiao, 3 villages of Jinghuapu and one village of Shuangjiangkou. The main industries in the zone consists of Food and Drink, Advanced Material, advanced equipment manufacturing, health product and cosmetics.
