= Xiaduopu =

Xiaduopu Town 夏铎铺镇
- Town
- Location in Hunan
- Coordinates: 28°13′45″N 112°38′44″E
- Country: People's Republic of China
- Province: Hunan
- Prefecture-level city: Changsha
- County-level city: Ningxiang

Area
  - Total: 103.4 km^{2} (39.9 sq mi)

Population
  - Total: 37,000
  - Density: 360/km^{2} (930/sq mi)
- Time zone: UTC+08:00 (China Standard)
- Postal code: 410604
- Area code: 0731
- Website: www.nxcity.gov.cn/xdp/index.htm

Chinese name
- Traditional Chinese: 夏鐸鋪鎮
- Simplified Chinese: 夏铎铺镇
Transcriptions
Standard Mandarin
- Hanyu Pinyin: Xiàduópù Zhèn

Xiaduopu (Chinese: 夏铎铺镇) is a rural town in Ningxiang City, Hunan Province, China. It is surrounded by Batang Town and Nantianping Township on the west, Jinzhou Town and Lijingpu Subdistrict on the north, Wushan Subdistrict and Bairuopu Town on the east, and Donghutang Town on the south. As of the 2000 census, it had a population of 35,123 and an area of 103.4 square kilometres (39.9 sq mi).

== Administrative division ==
The town is divided into six villages and three communities:

- Xiaduopu Community (夏铎铺社区)
- Gaoxin Community (高新社区)
- Fengqiao Community (凤桥社区)
- Xiangshanchong (香山冲村)
- Tianmanxin (天马新村)
- Liudu'an (六度庵村)
- Xingwang (兴旺村)
- Changlongxin (长龙新)
- Longfuxin (龙福新)

== Geography ==
The Xiangshanchong Reservoir (香山冲水库) is the largest reservoir and largest water body in the town.

== Economy ==
Peaches are important to the economy.

== Culture ==
Huaguxi is the most influential local theater.

== Education ==
- Xiaduopu Town Central Primary School
- Ningxiang No. 12 High School

== Transportation ==
China National Highway 319 runs through the territory of the town, as do Hunan Provincial Highway (S206; 206省道) and three county rural roads. The National Highway 319 continues into Yiyang City, link Xiaduopu Town to Lijingpu Subdistrict, Yutan Subdistrict, Chengjiao Subdistrict, Jinghuapu Township.

The Provincial Highway S327 runs southeast to west through the town.

The Jinzhou Avenue (金洲大道) passes across the town west to east.

The South Jinzhou Road (金洲南路), also known as Jintang Road (金唐公路), runs north to south through the western town.

The County Road X022 travels through central Xiaduopu.

== Attractions ==
Fenghuang Mountain National Forest Park (凤凰山国家森林公园) is a famous scenic spot in the town.

Xiangshan Temple (香山庵) is a Buddhist temple in the town.
