= Ningxiang Fragrant Hills National Forest Park =

Forest park in Hunan, China

- 宁乡香山国家森林公园
- Location within Hunan
- Type: Public park
- Location: Ningxiang, Hunan, China
- Coordinates: 28°10′N 112°37′E
- Area: 21.59-square-kilometre (8.34 sq mi)
- Created: 2009
- Status: Open all year

Chinese name
- Simplified Chinese: 宁乡香山国家森林公园
- Traditional Chinese: 寧鄉香山國家森林公園
Transcriptions
Standard Mandarin
- Hanyu Pinyin: Níngxiāng Xiāngshān Guójiā Sēnlín Gōngyuán

Phoenix Mountain National Forest Park
- Simplified Chinese: 凤凰山国家森林公园
- Traditional Chinese: 鳳凰山國家森林公園
Transcriptions
Standard Mandarin
- Hanyu Pinyin: Fènghuángshān Guójiā Sēnlín Gōngyuán

Ningxiang Fragrant Hills National Forest Park (Chinese: 宁乡香山国家森林公园), formerly known as Phoenix Mountain National Forest Park, is a national forest park located in the town of Xiaduopu, Ningxiang, Hunan, China.

== History ==
Ningxiang Fragrant Hills National Forest Park was officially established in December 2009, when it successfully applied for and was designated as a National Forest Park. Prior to this, it had been incorporated into the development plans of the Changsha Dahexi Pilot Zone as a key construction project, aiming to build it into a core green space and a renowned eco-tourism resort.

The region has been home to many notable figures throughout history. It is the birthplace of several prominent individuals, including Tao Runai, a talented scholar of the late Ming and early Qing dynasties renowned for his poetry, calligraphy, and writing, who was later known as one of the "Three Wonders of Chu". His son, Tao Zhidian, was a poet, medical scientist, and a secretary in the Grand Secretariat of the Qing dynasty (1644–1911). The area also boasts the unique distinction in Ningxiang's history of a "family of two Jinshi" (successful candidates in the imperial examination), namely Tong Hui (童翚; Tóng Huī) and his son Tóng Xiùchūn (童秀春; Tong Xiuchun), with the latter being a teacher to the influential official Zhang Zhidong. Additionally, several military leaders such as Huang Wanpeng, Huang Yue, Hong Zhaolin, and Hong Xing were born here.

== Geography ==
=== Geology ===
Ningxiang Fragrant Hills National Forest Park is part of the Heng Mountains remnant range. It begins at Huangmao Ridge and winds along the borders of several counties, featuring a series of hills including Lion Mountain (狮子山; 獅子山; Shīzi Shān), Fairy Maiden Ridge (仙女岭; 仙女嶺; Xiānnǚ Lǐng), Small Fish Ridge (小鱼岭; 小魚嶺; Xiǎoyú Lǐng), and Big Boundary Ridge (大界岭; 大界嶺; Dàjiè Lǐng).

=== Climate ===
Ningxiang Fragrant Hills National Forest Park is located in the mid-subtropical humid climate zone, characterized by abundant rainfall year-round and a pleasant climate.

=== Flora and fauna ===
Ningxiang Fragrant Hills National Forest Park has been confirmed to host 23 species of national key protected plants. The forest landscape changes dramatically with the seasons. One of the famous scenic spots is the "Bamboo Forest and Sea of Clouds" (竹林云海), indicating extensive bamboo growth.

Ningxiang Fragrant Hills National Forest Park is home to 14 species of national key protected animals.

== Scenic spots ==
Ningxiang Fragrant Hills National Forest Park is divided into three main scenic areas: Xiangshanchong Reservoir (香山冲水库; 香山衝水庫; Xiāngshānchōng Shuǐkù), Dragon Phoenix Gorge (龙凤峡; 龍鳳峽; Xiāngshānchōng Shuǐkù), and Jijia Hill (嵇加山; Jījiā Shān).

Some of the most renowned sights include:

- Bamboo Forest and Clouds Sea (竹林云海; 竹林雲海; Zhúlín Yúnhǎi): a picturesque area known for its bamboo groves and cloud formations.
- Fragrant Hills Misty Rain (香山烟雨; 香山煙雨; Xiāngshān Yānyǔ): a scenic spot likely named for its atmospheric conditions.
- Chessboard Giant Rock (棋盘巨石; 棋盤巨石; Qípán Jùshí): a notable large rock formation.
- Pagoda Sacred Tree (宝塔神树; 寶塔神樹; Bǎotǎ Shénshù): a revered tree, often associated with local lore.
- Xianggu Pond Waterfall (响鼓潭瀑布; 響鼓潭瀑佈; Xiǎnggǔ Tán Pùbù): a waterfall, contributing to the park's dynamic hydrology.
- Lying Horse Trough (烈马卧槽; 烈馬臥槽; Lièmǎ Wòcáo): a site associated with ancient battlefield legends.

Other historically significant sites include the Han dynasty stone carvings, Jingma Bridge, and the ancient post road.
