= Huilongpu =

Huilongpu Town 回龙铺镇
- Town
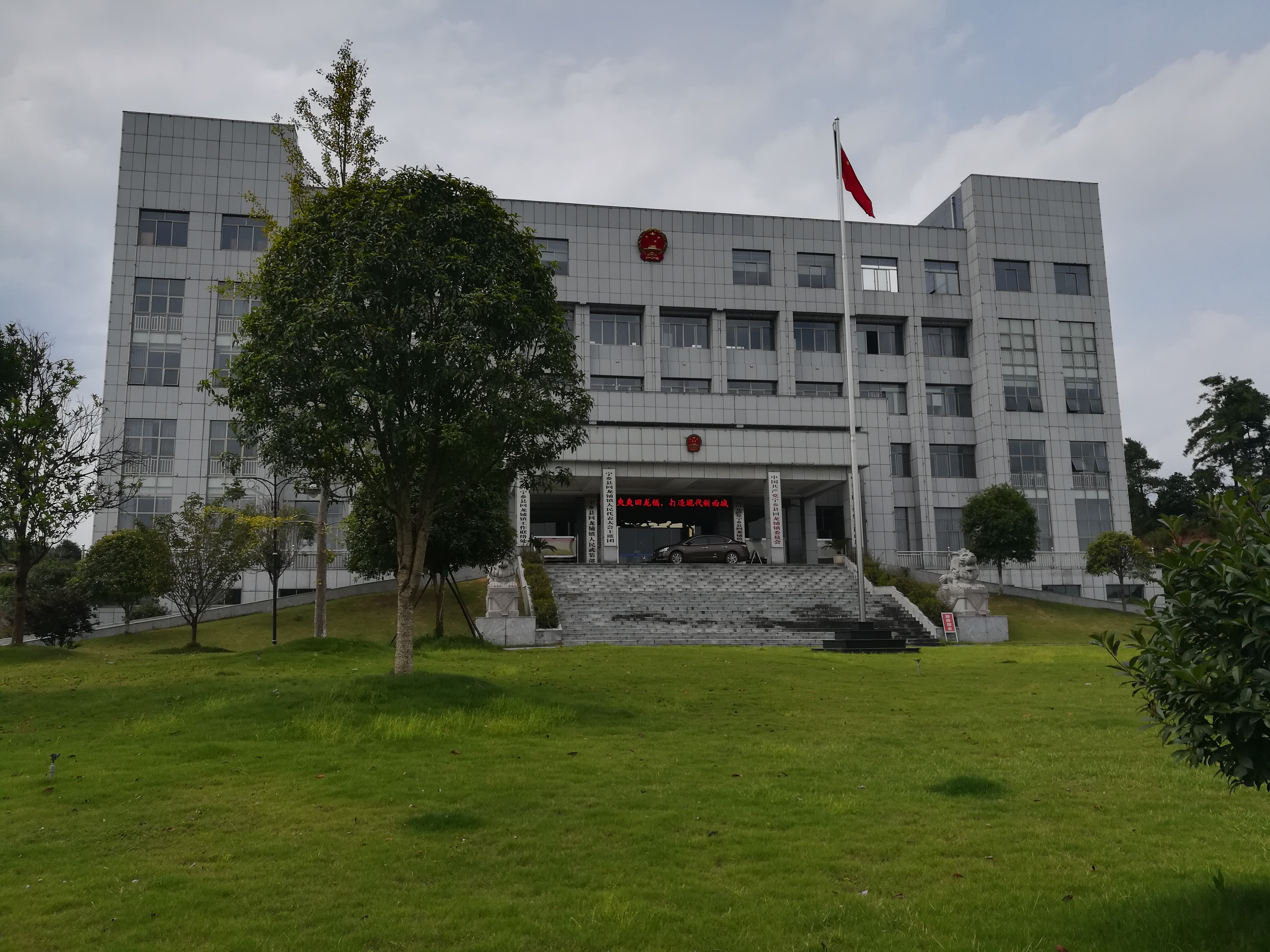
- Government building of Huilongpu Town.

- Location in Hunan
- Coordinates: 28°12′44″N 112°27′02″E
- Country: People's Republic of China
- Province: Hunan
- Prefecture-level city: Changsha
- County-level city: Ningxiang

Area
  - Total: 71.8 km^{2} (27.7 sq mi)

Population
  - Total: 37,000
  - Density: 520/km^{2} (1,300/sq mi)
- Time zone: UTC+08:00 (China Standard)
- Postal code: 410606
- Area code: 0731

Chinese name
- Traditional Chinese: 回龍鋪鎮
- Simplified Chinese: 回龙铺镇
Transcriptions
Standard Mandarin
- Hanyu Pinyin: Huílóngpù Zhèn

Huilongpu Town (Chinese: 回龙铺镇) is a rural town in Ningxiang City, Hunan Province, China. It is surrounded by Dachengqiao Town on the west, Meitanba Town and Jinghuapu Township on the north, Baimaqiao Subdistrict on the east, and Batang Town on the south. As of the 2007 census it had a population of 37,000 and an area of 71.8 square kilometres (27.7 sq mi).

== Administrative divisions ==
The town is divided into six villages and one community:

- Houzhiting Community (候旨亭社区)
- Huilongpu (回龙铺村)
- Jinyu (金玉村)
- Fengshou (丰收村)
- Baijin (白金村)
- Jinwang (金旺村)
- Yanhe(沿河村)

== Geography ==
The Wei River, known as "Mother River" and a tributary of the Xiang River, flows through the town.

== Economy ==
Watermelon is important to the economy.

== Culture ==
Huaguxi is the most influential local theater.

== Transport ==
The Provincial Highway S209 and County Road X091 runs east to west through the town.

The County Road X092 travels northwest, intersecting with Provincial Highway S206 at Wumuchong.

The Longjiang Avenue passes across the town north to south.

== Attractions ==
Local specialties include apples.
