= Qianlong Lake National Wetland Park =

Wetland in Hunan, China

- 千龙湖国家湿地公园
- Location within Hunan
- Type: Public park
- Location: Jinggang, Wangcheng District of Changsha, Hunan, China
- Coordinates: 28°25′N 112°42′E
- Area: 9.71 square kilometres (3.75 sq mi)
- Created: 2008
- Status: Open all year

Chinese name
- Simplified Chinese: 千龙湖国家湿地公园
- Traditional Chinese: 千龍湖國家濕地公園
- Literal meaning: Thousand Loong Lake National Wetland Park
Transcriptions
Standard Mandarin
- Hanyu Pinyin: Qiānlóng Hú Guójiā Shīdì Gōngyuán

Qianlong Lake National Wetland Park (Chinese: 千龙湖国家湿地公园) is a national wetland park located in the town of Jinggang, Wangcheng District of Changsha, Hunan, China.

== History ==
The history of Qianlong Lake National Wetland Park is closely tied to the Getang Reservoir (格塘水库; 格塘水庫; Gétáng Shuǐkù), an artificial medium-sized reservoir constructed in 1956. In November 2008, it was included in the national wetland park pilot program by the State Forestry Administration (now National Forestry and Grassland Administration). After five years of ecological construction and restoration efforts, it passed the national acceptance inspection at the end of 2014 and was formally designated as "Qianlong Lake National Wetland Park".

== Geography ==
Qianlong Lake National Wetland Park spans a total area of 9.71 square kilometres (3.75 sq mi), encompassing two main water bodies: Qianlong Lake and Tuantou Lake (团头湖; 團頭湖; Tuántóu Hú). Qianlong Lake has a normal storage capacity of 10,240,000 m^{3} (0.00246 cu mi), while Tuantou Lake can hold over 25,000,000 m^{3} (0.0060 cu mi) of water, which is the largest lake in the Changsha. The waters from both lakes eventually flow into the Xiang River, which lies about 5 kilometres (3.1 mi) to the east.

== Biodiversity ==
Qianlong Lake National Wetland Park is recognized for its rich biodiversity, comprising various ecosystems from aquatic plants to forested areas.

=== Flora and fauna ===
There are over 400 species of wild plants recorded in Qianlong Lake National Wetland Park.

Qianlong Lake National Wetland Park is a sanctuary for wildlife, particularly birds. It is home to 209 species of vertebrates, including: 46 species of fish and 126 species of birds.

== Main attractions ==
Qianlong Lake National Wetland Park is divided into several functional zones for conservation and recreation:

- Ecological Conservation Zone: the core protection area, primarily located within the Tuantou Lake sub-area and the lotus pond inside the Qianlong Lake dam.
- Wetland Restoration and Display Zone: an ideal area for sightseeing, eco-tourism, and wetland education.
- Leisure and Entertainment Zone: it offers a variety of products, including health and sports activities, dining, and water-based recreational projects. It also features facilities like an ecological beach and themed isles.
- Ecological Planting Demonstration Zone: a zone demonstrates ecological agriculture and forestry, and offers activities like fruit picking.
