= Yutan =

Yutan may refer to:

- Yutan, Nebraska, a city in Saunders County, Nebraska, United States
- Yutan Subdistrict (玉谭街道), a subdistrict in Ningxiang County, Hunan, China
- Yutan, Jilin (玉谭镇), a town in Nanguan District, Changchun, Jilin, China
- Yutan Township (Chinese: 雨坛乡), a township in Zongyang County, Anhui, China
