= Nantianping Township =

- Township

Chinese transcription(s)
  - Simplified: 南田坪乡
  - Traditional: 南田坪鄉
  - Pinyin: Nántiānpíng Xiāng
- Location in Hunan
- Coordinates: 28°06′51″N 112°31′16″E
- Country: People's Republic of China
- Province: Hunan
- City: Changsha
- County-level city: Ningxiang County

Area
  - Total: 64 km^{2} (25 sq mi)

Population
  - Total: 27,000
  - Density: 420/km^{2} (1,100/sq mi)
- Time zone: UTC+8 (China Standard)
- Postal code: 410618
- Area code: 0731

Nantianping Township (simplified Chinese: 南田坪乡; traditional Chinese: 南田坪鄉; pinyin: Nántiānpíng Xiāng) is a rural township in Ningxiang County, Changsha City, Hunan Province, China. It is surrounded by Zifu on the west, Batang Town on the north, Donghutang Town on the southeast, and Xiaduopu Town on the northeast. As of the 2000 census it had a population of 24,827 and an area of 64 square kilometres (25 sq mi). Nantianping township merged to Batang town on November 19, 2015.

== Administrative division ==
The township is divided into ten villages: Zhushan Village (竹山村), Yantian Village (烟田村), Yiping Village (宜坪村), Xifu Village (锡福村), Hengtian Village (横田村), Nanfentang Village (南芬塘村), Junli Village (军里村), Yangxi Village (洋西村), Hongtaoshan Village (红桃山村) and Nantianping Village (南田坪村).

== Geography ==
The Wu River, a tributary of the Wei River, flows through the town.

== Economy ==
The region abounds with iron.

== Culture ==
Huaguxi has the most influence local theatrical syle.
