= Meitanba =

Meitanba Town 煤炭坝镇
- Town
- Location in Hunan
- Coordinates: 28°14′34″N 112°23′44″E
- Country: People's Republic of China
- Province: Hunan
- Prefecture-level city: Changsha
- County-level city: Ningxiang

Area
  - Total: 73.4 km^{2} (28.3 sq mi)

Population
  - Total: 53,000
  - Density: 720/km^{2} (1,900/sq mi)
- Time zone: UTC+08:00 (China Standard)
- Postal code: 410609
- Area code: 0731

Chinese name
- Traditional Chinese: 煤炭壩鎮
- Simplified Chinese: 煤炭坝镇
Transcriptions
Standard Mandarin
- Hanyu Pinyin: Méitànbà Zhèn

Meitanba (Chinese: 煤炭坝镇) is a rural town in Ningxiang City, Hunan Province, China. It is surrounded by Yujia'ao Township on the west, Yuejiaqiao Town on the north, Jinghuapu Township on the east, and Dachengqiao Township and Huilongpu Town on the south. As of the 2000 census it had a population of 50,567 and an area of 73.4 square kilometres (28.3 sq mi).

== Administrative divisions ==
The town is divided into six villages and one community:

- Meitaba Community (煤炭坝社区)
- Shuanglong (双龙村)
- Heshiqiao (贺石桥村)
- Dongshan (东山村)
- Heshiqiao (贺石桥村)
- Zhuantang (砖塘村)
- Fujia (富家村)

== Geography ==
The region abounds with coal.

== Culture ==
Huaguxi is the most influential local theater.

== Transportation ==
China National Highway 319 runs through the town's territory, as do Hunan Provincial Highway 206 (S206; 206省道) and three county rural roads. The 1824 Provincial Highway (1824省道) from Jinghuapu Township, running through Meitanba Town to Taojiang County.

== Attractions ==
Baishi Temple (白石庵), built during the reign of the Ming dynasty Jiajing Emperor (r. 1521–1567), is a Buddhist temple in the town destroyed and rebuilt several times.

== Notable individuals ==
- He Yaozu(贺耀祖), general.
