= Chengjiao =

Chengjiao may refer to:

- Zhao Chengjiao (fl. 3rd century BC), prince of Qin during the Warring States period who later defected to Zhao

== Subdistricts ==
- Chengjiao Subdistrict, Guangzhou, in Conghua District, Guangzhou, Guangdong, China
- Chengjiao Subdistrict, Ningxiang County, in Ningxiang County, Hunan, China
- Chengjiao Subdistrict, Ulan Hot, in Ulan Hot, Inner Mongolia, China
- Chengjiao Subdistrict, Yushu, in Yushu, Jilin, China
- Chengjiao Subdistrict, Guangshui, in Guangshui, Suizhou, Hubei, China

== Towns ==
- Chengjiao, Shaowu, in Shaowu, Fujian, China
- Chengjiao, Linxia, in Linxia, Gansu, China
- Chengjiao, Shenyang, in Liaozhong District, Shenyang, Liaoning, China

== Townships ==
- Chengjiao Township, Longyan, in Yongding District, Longyan, Fujian, China
- Chengjiao Township, Ninghua County, in Ninghua County, Fujian, China
- Chengjiao Township, Zherong County, in Zherong County, Fujian, China
- Chengjiao Township, Gansu, in Wudu County, Longnan, Gansu, China
- Chengjiao Township, Heilongjiang, in Bei'an, Heilongjiang, China
- Chengjiao Township, Suizhong County, in Suizhong County, Liaoning, China
- Chengjiao Township, Dancheng County, in Dancheng County, Henan, China
- Chengjiao Township, Fugou County, in Fugou County, Henan, China
- Chengjiao Township, Gushi County, in Gushi County, Henan, China
- Chengjiao Township, Linzhou, in Linzhou, Henan, China
- Chengjiao Township, Luoning County, in Luoning County, Henan, China
- Chengjiao Township, Nanzhao County, in Nanzhao County, Henan, China
- Chengjiao Township, Ningling County, in Ningling County, Henan, China
- Chengjiao Township, Qi County, in Qi County (Kaifeng), Henan, China
- Chengjiao Township, Sheqi County, in Sheqi County, Henan, China
- Chengjiao Township, Sui County, in Sui County, Henan, China
- Chengjiao Township, Taikang County, in Taikang County, Henan, China
- Chengjiao Township, Tanghe County, in Tanghe County, Henan, China
- Chengjiao Township, Tongbai County, in Tongbai County, Henan, China
- Chengjiao Township, Weihui, in Weihui, Henan, China
- Chengjiao Township, Xi County, in Xi County, Henan, China
- Chengjiao Township, Xinye County, in Xiney County, Henan, China
- Chengjiao Township, Yucheng County, in Yucheng County, Henan, China
- Chengjiao Township, Hubei, in Guangshui, Hubei, China
- Chengjiao Township, Chenxi County, in Chenxi County, Hunan, China
- Chengjiao Township, Miluo, in Miluo, Hunan, China
- Chengjiao Township, Rucheng County, in Rucheng County, Hunan, China
- Chengjiao Township, Yongxing County, in Yongxing County, Hunan, China
- Chengjiao Township, Sichuan, in Fucheng District, Mianyang, Sichuan, China
