= Zhuliangqiao Township =

- Township

Chinese transcription(s)
  - Simplified: 朱良桥乡
  - Traditional: 朱良橋鄉
  - Pinyin: Zhūliángqiáo Xiāng
- Location in Hunan
- Coordinates: 28°23′11″N 112°36′34″E
- Country: People's Republic of China
- Province: Hunan
- City: Changsha
- County-level city: Ningxiang County

Area
  - Total: 82.72 km^{2} (31.94 sq mi)

Population
  - Total: 33,000
  - Density: 400/km^{2} (1,000/sq mi)
- Time zone: UTC+8 (China Standard)
- Postal code: 410603
- Area code: 0731

Zhuliangqiao Township (simplified Chinese: 朱良桥乡; traditional Chinese: 朱良橋鄉; pinyin: Zhūliángqiáo Xiāng) is a rural township in Ningxiang County, Changsha City, Hunan Province, China. It is surrounded by Oujiangcha Town on the northwest, Qiaokou Town and Jinggang Town on the north, and Shuangjiangkou Town on the east. As of the 2000 census, it had a population of 31,786 and an area of 82.75 square kilometres (31.95 sq mi). Zhuliangqiao township merged to Shuangjiangkou town on November 19, 2015.

== Administrative divisions ==
The township is divided into the following ten villages: Luoxiangxin Village (罗巷新村), Xinyan Village (新颜村), Chaziqiao Village (槎梓桥村), Zuojiashan Village (左家山村), Zhuliangqiao Village (朱良桥村), Nantang Village (南塘村), Tangui Village (檀桂村), Xinggui Village (兴桂村), Yunji Village (云济村), and Lianhuashan Village (莲花山村).

== Economy ==
Citrus fruits, such as limes and lemons, and tobacco production play an important part in the local economy.

== Culture ==
Huaguxi, a traditional form of Chinese opera, is a locally influential theatrical art.
