= Dachengqiao =

Dachengqiao Town 大成桥镇
- Town
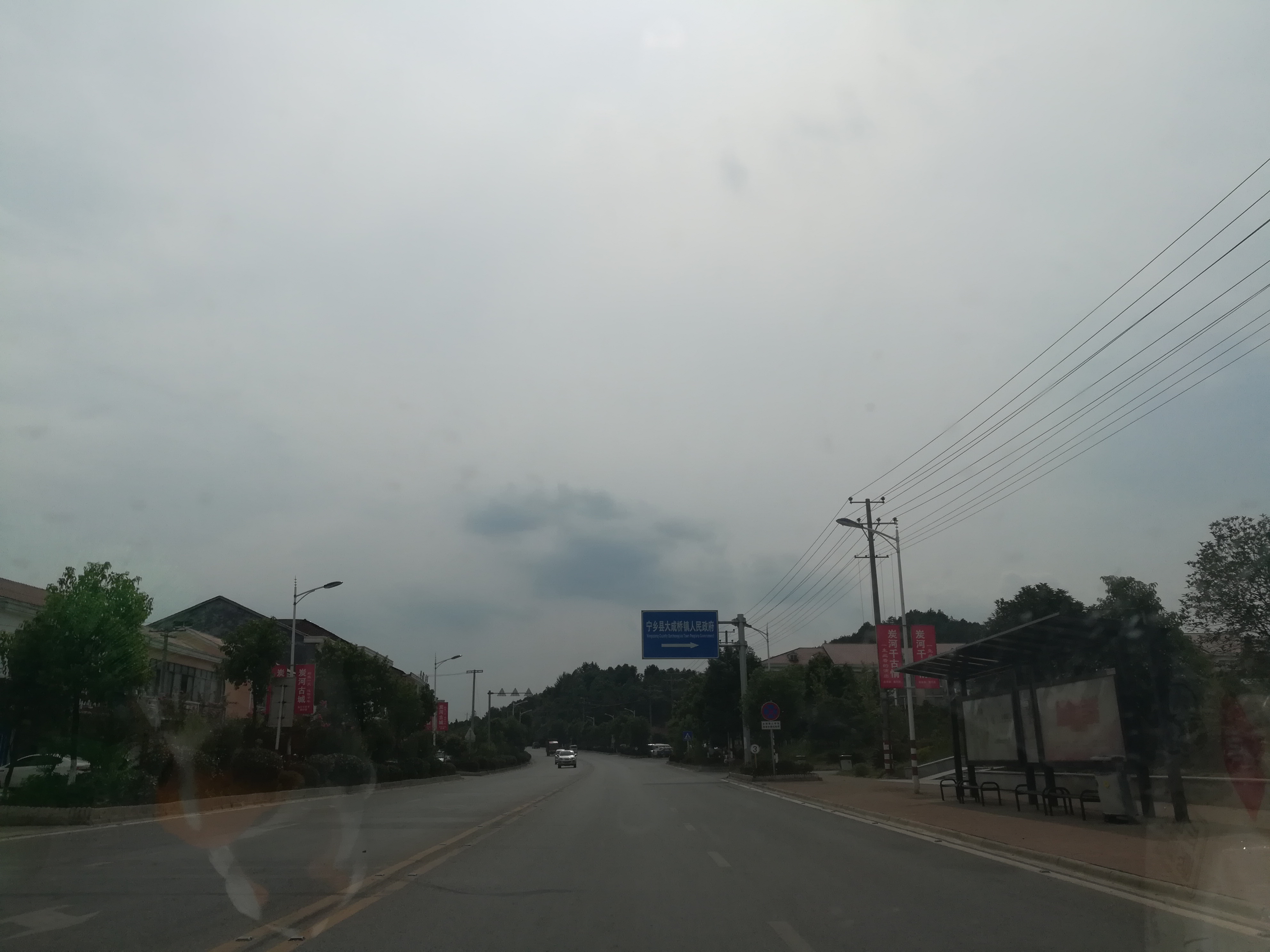
- Provincial Highway S209 in Dachengqiao Town of Ningxiang.

- Location in Hunan
- Coordinates: 28°11′09″N 112°22′32″E
- Country: People's Republic of China
- Province: Hunan
- Prefecture-level city: Changsha
- County-level city: Ningxiang

Area
  - Total: 58 km^{2} (22 sq mi)

Population
  - Total: 32,000
  - Density: 550/km^{2} (1,400/sq mi)
- Time zone: UTC+08:00 (China Standard)
- Postal code: 410623
- Area code: 0731

Chinese name
- Traditional Chinese: 大成橋鎮
- Simplified Chinese: 大成桥镇
Transcriptions
Standard Mandarin
- Hanyu Pinyin: Dàchéngqiáo Zhèn

Dachengqiao (Chinese: 大成桥镇) is a rural town in Ningxiang City, Hunan Province, China. It is surrounded by Shuangfupu Town on the west, Meitanba Town and Yujia'ao Township on the north, Huilongpu Town on the east, and Zifu and Batang Town on the south. As of the 2000 census it had a population of 31,355 and an area of 58 square kilometres (22 sq mi).

== Administrative divisions ==
The town is divided into five villages and three communities:

- Dachengqiao Community (大成桥社区)
- Chenggongtang Community (成功塘社区)
- Qingquan Community (清泉社区)
- Yuxin (玉新村)
- Erquan (二泉村)
- Meiming (梅鸣村)
- Queshan (鹊山村)
- Yongsheng (永盛村)

== Geography ==
Wei River is known as "Mother River", a tributary of the Xiang River, it flows through the town.

== Economy ==
Watermelon is important to the economy.

== Culture ==
Huaguxi is the most influential local theater.

== Transport ==
The Provincial Highway S209 passes across the town.

The Provincial Highway S206 runs north to Huishangang, intersecting with S71 Yiyang-Loudi-Hengyang Expressway.

The County Road X091 runs east to west through the town.
