= Xieleqiao =

Xieleqiao Town
- Town

Chinese transcription(s)
  - Simplified: 偕乐桥镇
  - Traditional: 偕樂橋鎮
  - Pinyin: Xiélèqiáo Zhèn
- Location in China
- Coordinates: 28°02′09″N 112°22′01″E
- Country: People's Republic of China
- Province: Hunan
- City: Changsha
- County: Ningxiang County

Area
  - Total: 72.5 km^{2} (28.0 sq mi)

Population
  - Total: 21,000
  - Density: 290/km^{2} (750/sq mi)
- Time zone: UTC+8 (China Standard)
- Postal code: 410621
- Area code: 0731

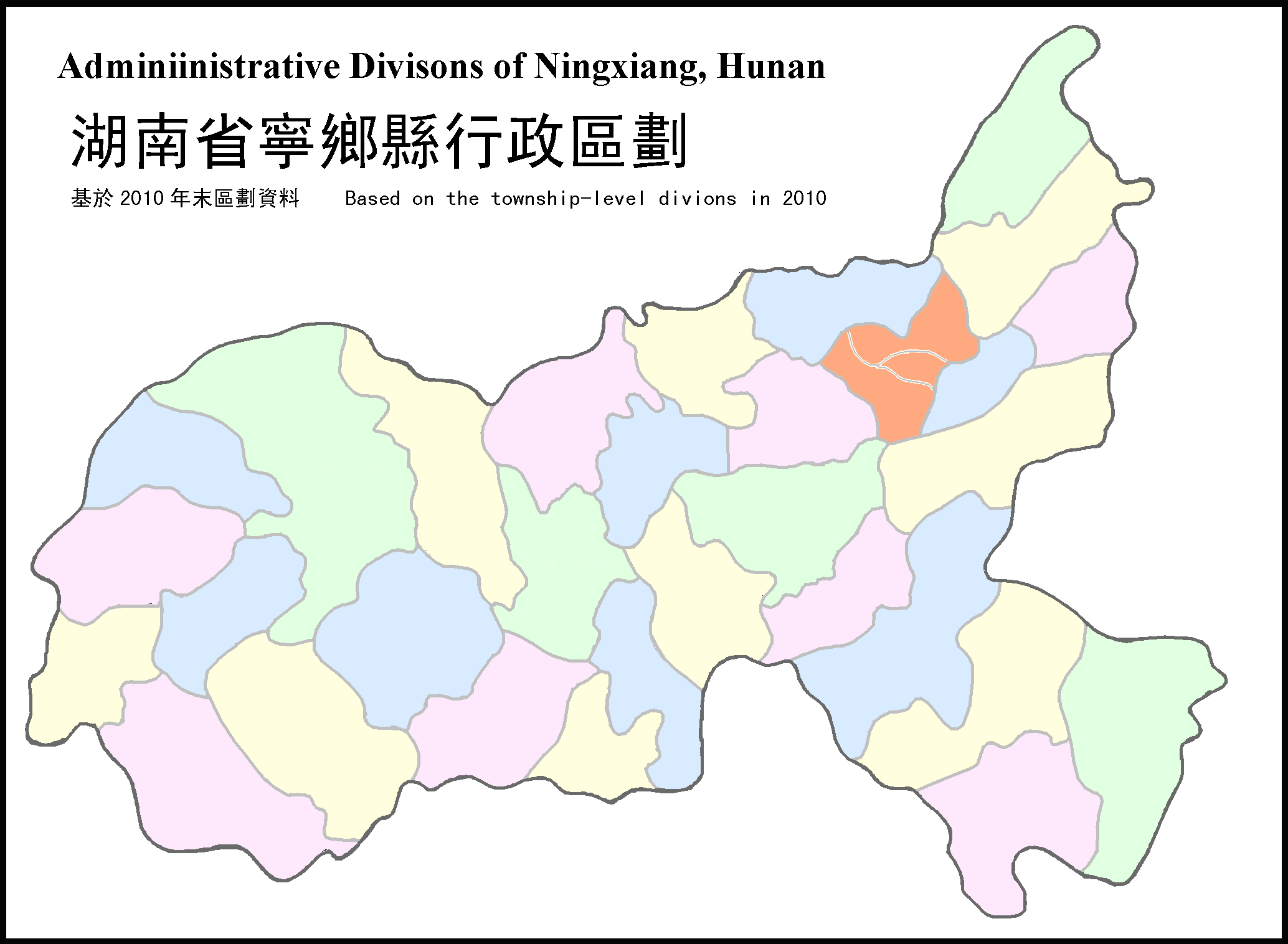
Divisions of Ningxiang, Hunan

Xieleqiao Town (simplified Chinese: 偕乐桥镇; traditional Chinese: 偕樂橋鎮; pinyin: Xiélèqiáo Zhèn) is an urban town in Ningxiang County, Changsha City, Hunan Province, China. It is surrounded by Huitang Town and Fengmuqiao Township on the west, Shuangfupu Town on the north, Zifu on the east, and Jinsou Township on the south. As of the 2000 census it had a population of 30,370 and an area of 76.5 square kilometres (29.5 sq mi). Fengmuqiao township and Xieleqiao town merged to Huitang town on November 19, 2015.

== Administrative division ==
The Town is divided into nine villages and one community: Xieleqiao Community (偕乐桥社区), Shuinan Village (水南村), Fujian Village (福建村), Kangning Village (康宁村), Bashi Village (八石村), Shuangpen Village (双盆村), Zhutian Village (竹田村), Fenhua Village (汾华村), Jiangjun Village (将军村) and Jinong Village (金农村).

== Geography ==
Wu River, a tributary of the Wei River, it flows through the town.

== Economy ==
Tea, Citrus and prunus mume are important to the economy.

== Education ==
There are two junior high schools and six primary schools located with the town.

== Culture ==
Huaguxi is the most influence local theater.
