= Batang, Ningxiang =

Batang Town 坝塘镇
- Town
- Location in Hunan
- Coordinates: 28°08′49″N 112°28′22″E
- Country: People's Republic of China
- Province: Hunan
- Prefecture-level city: Changsha
- County-level city: Ningxiang

Area
  - Total: 163.7 km^{2} (63.2 sq mi)

Population (2015)
  - Total: 70,000
  - Density: 430/km^{2} (1,100/sq mi)
- Time zone: UTC+08:00 (China Standard)
- Postal code: 410618
- Area code: 0731
- Website: www.nxcity.gov.cn/btz/

Chinese name
- Traditional Chinese: 壩塘鎮
- Simplified Chinese: 坝塘镇
Transcriptions
Standard Mandarin
- Hanyu Pinyin: Bàtáng Zhèn

Batang (Chinese: 坝塘镇) is a rural town in Ningxiang City, Hunan Province, China. It is surrounded by Zifu on the west, Huilongpu Town and Baimaqiao Subdistrict on the north, Xiaduopu Town on the east, and Huaminglou Town on the south. As of the 2007 census it had a population of 70,000 and an area of 163.7 square kilometres (63.2 sq mi). Nantianping township merged to Batang town on November 19, 2015.

== Administrative divisions ==
The town is divided into 13 villages and one community:

- Batang Community (坝塘社区)
- Yanjiang (沿江村)
- Le'an (乐安村)
- Jinzhou (金洲村)
- Weiwu (沩乌村)
- Bao'an (保安村)
- Jinhe (金河村)
- Youmatian (油麻田村)
- Fanrong (繁荣村)
- Nantianping (南田坪村)
- Nanfentang (南芬塘村)
- Yangxitang (洋西塘村)
- Hengtianwan (横田湾村)
- Tingzhongxin (停钟新村)

== Geography ==
The Wu River (乌江), a tributary of the Wei River known as "Mother River" and a tributary of the Xiang River, flows through the town.

The town has four reservoirs: Shiniu Reservoir (石牛水库; 'Stone Cattle Reservoir'), Dongchong Reservoir (洞冲水库), Huaguang Reservoir (华光水库) and Wenjiachong Reservoir (文家冲水库).

== Economy ==
The region abounds with manganese.

Peach, prunus mume and tobacco are important to the economy.

== Education ==
There is one senior high school located with the town limits: Ningxiang Second Senior High School (宁乡二中).

== Culture ==
Huaguxi is the most influential local theater.

== Transport ==
The County Road X096 runs south to north through the town.

The County Road X093 travels southeast to Huaminglou Town, intersecting Provincial Highway S208.

== Attractions ==
On 16 December 2011, local people discovered 128 bridges built during the reign of the Qianlong Emperor (r. 1735–1796).
