= Jinggang Town =

Jinggang 靖港镇
- Town
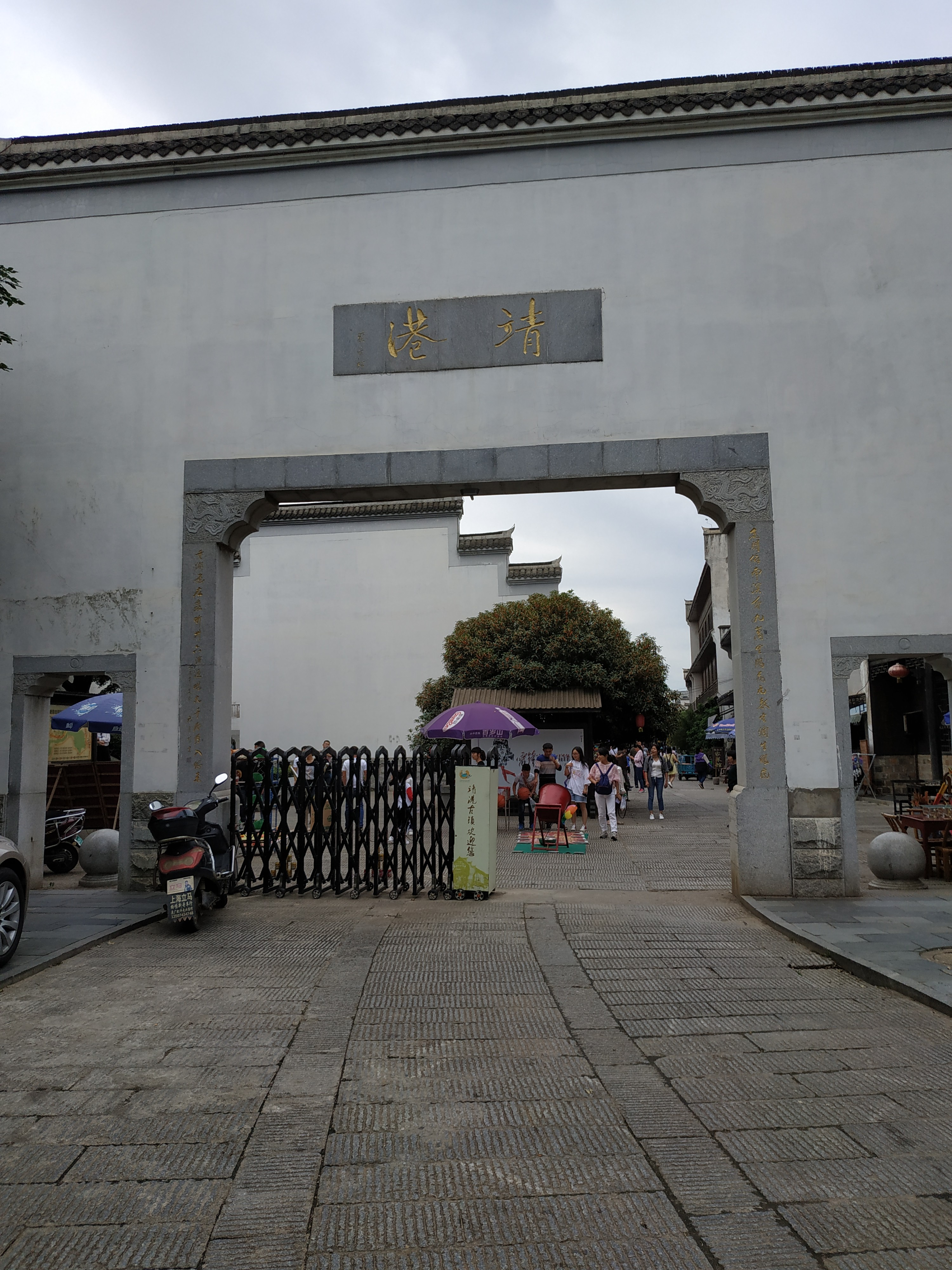
- Jinggang Ancient Town.

- Location in Hunan
- Coordinates: 28°27′41″N 112°47′31″E
- Country: People's Republic of China
- Province: Hunan
- Prefecture-level city: Changsha
- District: Wangcheng

Area
  - Total: 92.47 km^{2} (35.70 sq mi)

Population
  - Total: 67,300
  - Density: 728/km^{2} (1,890/sq mi)
- 2015
- Time zone: UTC+8 (China Standard)
- Postal code: 410204
- Area code: 0731
- ISO 3166 code: 2541

Jinggang (simplified Chinese: 靖港镇; traditional Chinese: 靖港鎮; pinyin: Jìnggǎng zhèn) is a town in Wangcheng district, Changsha, Hunan province, China. The town is located on the west bank of Xiang River, and bordered by Qiaokou to the north, Zhuliangqiao and Shuangjiangkou of Ningxiang to the west, Gaotangling to the south, Tongguan across the Xiang river to the east. It covers 92.47 km^{2} (35.70 sq mi) with a population of 67,300. The Jinggang town was formed by the former Jinggang and Getang towns on November 19, 2015. According to the result of 2016 adjustment programmes on village-level divisions (村级区划调整), the town has two residential communities and 10 villages under its jurisdiction; the administrative office is at Nongxi village (农溪村).

== History ==
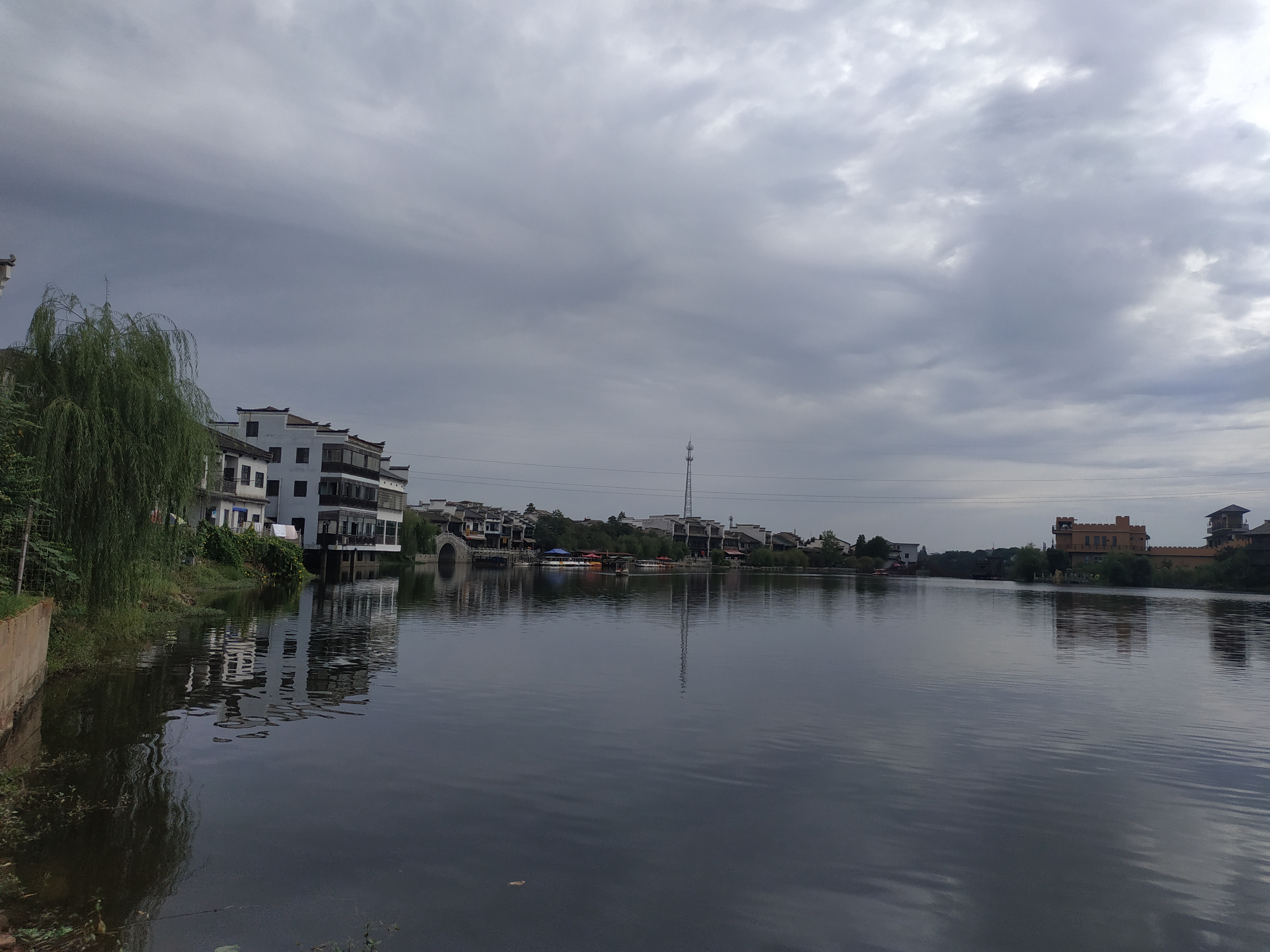
A man-made lake in Jinggang Ancient Town.

Jinggang, also known as "Weigang" (沩港), is located at the northwest of Wangcheng District and was named so due to the general of Tang dynasty (618–907) Li Jing's (571–649) stationing here. Jinggang was firstly mentioned in National Chorography (一统志; Yī Tǒng Zhì), which read: "Tang dynasty Li Jing fought against Xiao Xian stationing troops here." In the Xianfeng period (1850–1861) of Qing dynasty (1644–1911), the Xiang Army led by Zeng Guofan (1811–1872) fought against the Taiping Army here. According to the Changsha County Annals (长沙县志), the book described Jinggang as "Tang dynasty Li Jing station troops here, the army doesn't commit the slightest offence against the civilians, the local people are very nostalgic for him and named the place after him." From the Ming and Qing dynasties (1368–1911) to the Republican period (1912–1949), Jinggang was the well-known rice market in Hunan and distribution port of Huai salt. It was one of the four rice market in Hunan and known as "Little Hankou". By the end of 19th century, Jianggang had been over 90 rice shops, five money exchange shops, and numerous handicraft workshops and scissor-cut, woodworking, manual scale, iron forging, paper umbrella, manufacturing and other handicraft industries gave full play to their respective strong point. Nearly all families on Granite Street were shops, the permanent resident population reached 40,000 and transient population exceeded 10,000. In 2008, Jinggang was rated as one of the 4th batch of "Historic and Cultural Towns in China".

== Subdivision ==
On March 23, 2016, the village-level divisions of Jinggang were adjusted from 16 to 12. There 10 villages and two residential community in the town.

Administrative divisions of Jinggang town in 2016
amount of divisions: two residential community and eight villages
villages and residential communities		villages and residential communities	
English name	Chinese name	English name	Chinese name
Lujiang residential community	芦江社区	Zhongxing residential community	众兴社区
Yangjiashan village	杨家山村	Sanqiao village	三桥村
Shihao village	石毫村	Fusheng village	复胜村
Futang village	福塘村	Qianbang village	前榜村
Xinfeng village	新峰村	Boye village	柏叶村
Lingchong village	凌冲村	Getang village	格塘村

== Attractions ==
Jianggang is home to Yangsi Tower (杨泗塔), Guanyin Temple (观音庙) and Ziyun Palace (紫云宫). Guanyin Temple is a Buddhist temple and Ziyun Palace is a Taoist temple in the town. Underground CPC Hunan Provincial Committee Office Site (地下湖南省委办公遗址), Former Residence of Liu Chouxi (刘畴西故居), Former Residence of Tao Cheng (陶承故居) are also famous scenic spots.
