= Huang Yali =

- 黄雅莉
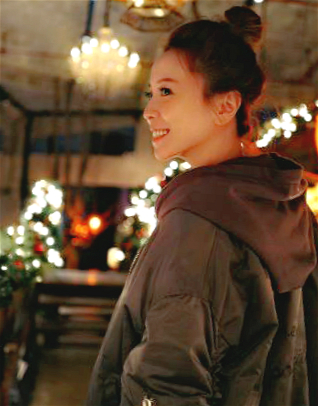
- Huang Yali in December 2016.
- Born: March 22, 1989 (age 36); Yutan Subdistrict, Ningxiang, Hunan, China
- Occupation: Singer
- Years active: 2005–present
- Spouse: Wang Hao
- Awards: Sixth place - Super Girl
- Musical career
- Genres: Mandopop
- Labels: Linfair Records Ltd.

Chinese name
- Traditional Chinese: 黃雅莉
- Simplified Chinese: 黄雅莉
Transcriptions
Standard Mandarin
- Hanyu Pinyin: Huáng Yǎlì

Huang Yali (Chinese: 黄雅莉; born March 22, 1989) is a Chinese pop singer who earned sixth place in the 2006 Super Girl contest.

== Biography ==
Huang was born and raised in the town of Yutan (now Yutan Subdistrict), Ningxiang, Hunan, China. During her childhood years, Huang developed an interest in singing and experimented with several different vocal techniques after listening to the songs of popular female singers such as Jolin Tsai and Stefanie Sun.

While still a 16-year-old student at the Number 4 High School in Ningxiang, Huang participated in the 2005 Super Girl singing contest. She won the second of the qualifying competitions in Changsha, then finished sixth in the overall competition. In 2007, Huang went to Tokyo and Singapore to study music.

Her first single was "Hudie Quanbian"(蝴蝶泉边), recorded during the time she was on Super Girl. She joined EE-Media in 2005. Her debut album, titled "Baby" (崽崽), was released on 19 December 2006. On July 11, 2008, she joined Linfair Records Ltd. Her 2nd album, titled " I shall not Fear" (雅莉不怕), was released on 19 June 2009. Her 3rd album, titled "Former Girlfriend" (前任女友), was released on 20 December 2010. Her 4th album, titled "Annual Ring" (年轮), was released on 26 October 2012.

In 2006, she appeared in the television series "Meili Fenbei" (美丽分贝). In 2007, Her film debut was in "Hard to Get Notre Dame Tickets" (一票难求). In that year, she appeared in the television series "The Guy was Gorgeous" (那小子真帅).

== Personal life ==
On July 2, 2021, in the variety show Back to Field, Huang revealed that she and her first boyfriend Wang Hao (王皓), who had been dating for 16 years, had married. On December 4, 2023, Huang announced her pregnancy on social media.

== Discography ==
=== Albums ===
Release date	Title	Chinese Title
2006	Baby	崽崽
2009	I shall not Fear	雅莉不怕
2010	Former Girlfriend	前任女友
2012	Annual Ring	年轮
2014	Huang Yali's Fantasy Show	黄雅莉的奇幻秀
2017	Storyteller in Tears	说故事的人总掉眼泪

=== Singles ===
Release date	Title	Chinese Title
2006	Hudie Quanbian	蝴蝶泉边

== Filmography ==
Year	Title	Role	Chinese Title
2006	TV: Meili Fenbei		美丽分贝
2007	Film: Hard to Get Notre Dame Tickets		一票难求
2007	TV: The Guy was Gorgeous		那小子真帅
