= Baimaqiao Subdistrict =

Baimaqiao Subdistrict 白马桥街道
- Subdistrict
- Location in Hunan
- Coordinates: 28°13′36″N 112°32′07″E
- Country: People's Republic of China
- Province: Hunan
- Prefecture-level city: Changsha
- County-level city: Ningxiang

Area
  - Total: 22.8 km^{2} (8.8 sq mi)

Population
  - Total: 50,000
  - Density: 2,200/km^{2} (5,700/sq mi)
- Time zone: UTC+08:00 (China Standard)
- Postal code: 410699
- Area code: 0731

Chinese name
- Traditional Chinese: 白馬橋街道
- Simplified Chinese: 白马桥街道
Transcriptions
Standard Mandarin
- Hanyu Pinyin: Baímäqiáo Jiēdào

Baimaqiao Subdistrict (Chinese: 白马桥街道) is a subdistrict in Ningxiang City, Hunan Province, China. It is surrounded by Jinghuapu Township on the northwest, Yutan Subdistrict and Chengjiao Subdistrict on the northeast, Lijingpu Subdistrict on the southeast, and Huilongpu Town on the southeast. As of the 2000 census it had a population of 20,458 and an area of 22.8 square kilometres (8.8 sq mi).

== Administrative divisions ==
The subdistrict is divided into three villages and two communities: Fengxingshan Community (凤形山社区), Zhengnong Community (正农社区), Bailong Village (白龙村), Baima Village (白马村), and Renfu Village (仁福村).

== Geography ==
The Wuzhi Reservoir (五指水库) is located in the subdistrict and discharges into the Wei River. Wei River, known as "Mother River" and a tributary of the Xiang River, flows through the subdistrict.

== Transport ==
The Provincial Highway S209 passes through the subdistrict.

== Culture ==
Huaguxi is the most influential form of local theater.
