= Fengmuqiao Township =

- Township

Chinese transcription(s)
  - Simplified: 枫木桥乡
  - Traditional: 楓木橋鄉
  - Pinyin: Fēngmùqiáo Xiāng
- Location in Hunan
- Coordinates: 28°01′21″N 112°16′31″E
- Country: People's Republic of China
- Province: Hunan
- City: Changsha
- County-level city: Ningxiang County

Area
  - Total: 72.6 km^{2} (28.0 sq mi)

Population
  - Total: 38,000
  - Density: 520/km^{2} (1,400/sq mi)
- Time zone: UTC+8 (China Standard)
- Postal code: 410634
- Area code: 0731

Fengmuqiao Township (simplified Chinese: 枫木桥乡; traditional Chinese: 楓木橋鄉; pinyin: Fēngmùqiáo Xiāng) is a rural township in Ningxiang County, Changsha City, Hunan Province, China. It is surrounded by Longtian Town and Xiangzikou Town on the west, Laoliangcang Town and Shuangfupu Town on the north, Xieleqiao Town and Huitang Town on the east, and Xiangxiang City on the south. As of the 2000 census it had a population of 36,517 and an area of 72.6 square kilometres (28.0 sq mi). Fengmuqiao township and Xieleqiao town merged to Huitang town on November 19, 2015.

== Administrative divisions ==
The township is divided into eleven villages: Niujiao Village (牛角村), Fengmu Village (枫木村), Xing Village (杏村), Shanlong Village (山龙村), Yuanhe Village (袁河村), Dongting Village (洞庭村), Shuangjing Village (双井村), Yangtang Village (杨塘村), Xinfeng Village (新风村), Hongqiao Village (洪桥村) and Yongxin Village (永兴村).

== Geography ==
Dongting Reservoir (洞庭水库) is located in the town and discharges into the Wei River.

== Economy ==
Tobacco is important to the economy.

== Culture ==
Huaguxi is the most influential form of theater in the local area.

== Attractions ==
Longxing Temple (隆兴庵) is a Buddhist temple in the town and a scenic spot.

== Notable individuals ==
- Wang Lingbo (1888–1942), revolutionary.
- Chin Hou-hsiu, mother of Ma Ying-jeou, the President of the Republic of China (Taiwan).
