= Qiaokou Town =

Qiaokou town 乔口镇
- town
- Location in Hunan
- Coordinates: 28.508°N 112.729°E
- Country: People's Republic of China
- Province: Hunan
- Prefecture-level city: Changsha
- district: Wangcheng

Area
  - Total: 46.23 km^{2} (17.85 sq mi)

Population (2010 census)
  - Total: 30,068
  - Density: 650.4/km^{2} (1,685/sq mi)
- Time zone: UTC+8 (China Standard)
- Website: http://qkz.wangcheng.gov.cn/

Qiaokou (simplified Chinese: 乔口镇; traditional Chinese: 喬口鎮; pinyin: Qiáokǒu Zhèn) is a town of Wangcheng district, Changsha, China. It is located on the western bank of Xiang river. The town is bordered by Lingbei town of Xiangyin to the north, Oujiangcha town of Heshan, Yiyang to the northwest, Jinggang Town to the west and south, Zhangshu town of Xiangyin and Chating town across the Xiang river to the east.

The Qiaokou town covers an area of 46.23 km^{2} (17.85 sq mi) with a population of 30,068 (2010 census). The subdistrict has one residential community and seven villages under its jurisdiction in 2016.

== Subdivision ==
On March 23, 2016, the village-level divisions of Qiaokou were adjusted from 11 to 8, Qiaokou residential community (乔口社区) reformed by merging Qiaokou residential community and Heyehu village (荷叶湖村), Tianxinping village (田心坪村) reformed by merging tianxinping and Shuixing (水星村) villages, Lantangsi village (蓝塘寺村) reformed by merging Lantangsi and Xianyutang (鲜鱼塘村) villages. There seven villages and one residential community.

Administrative divisions of Qiaokou town in 2016
amount of divisions: 1 residential community and 7 villages
villages and residential communities		villages	
English name	Chinese name	English name	Chinese name
Qiaokou residential community formed by merging the former Qiaokou residential community and Heyehu village on March 23, 2016	乔口社区; 2016年3月23日，由原乔口社区、荷叶湖村合并设置	Dalongwei village	大垅围村
Lantangsi village formed by merging the former Lantangsi and Xianyutang villages on March 23, 2016	蓝塘寺村; 2016年3月23日，由原蓝塘寺村、鲜鱼塘村合并设置	Longpanling village	盘龙岭村
Tianxinping village formed by merging the former Tianxinping and Shuixing villages on March 23, 2016	田心坪村; 2016年3月23日，由原田心坪村、水星村合并设置	Tuantouhu village	团头湖村
Liulinjiang village	柳林江村	Zhanshui village	湛水村
