= Lijingpu Subdistrict =

Lijingpu Subdistrict 历经铺街道
- Subdistrict
- Location in Hunan
- Coordinates: 28°15′08″N 112°36′45″E
- Country: People's Republic of China
- Province: Hunan
- Prefecture-level city: Changsha
- County-level city: Ningxiang

Area
  - Total: 35 km^{2} (14 sq mi)

Population
  - Total: 34,000
  - Density: 970/km^{2} (2,500/sq mi)
- Time zone: UTC+08:00 (China Standard)
- Postal code: 410604
- Area code: 0731

Chinese name
- Traditional Chinese: 歷經鋪街道
- Simplified Chinese: 历经铺街道
Transcriptions
Standard Mandarin
- Hanyu Pinyin: Lìjīngpù Jiēdào

Lijingpu Subdistrict (Chinese: 历经铺街道) is a rural subdistrict in Ningxiang City, Hunan Province, China. It is surrounded by Yutan Subdistrict, Chengjiao Subdistrict and Baimaqiao Subdistrict on the west, Shuangjiangkou Town on the north and Xiaduopu Town on the southeast. As of the 2000 census it had a population of 27,952 and an area of 35 square kilometres (14 sq mi).

== Administrative divisions ==
The subdistrict is divided into seven villages and one community: Jinnan Community (金南社区), Ziyun Village (紫云村), Jingtuan Village (净土庵村), Qunxing Village (群星村), Dawanling Village (大湾岭村), Lijingpu Village (历经铺村), Nantaihu Village (南太湖村) and Xinbaota Village (新宝塔村).

== Geography ==
The Wu River, a tributary of the Wei River, it flows through the town.

== Economy ==
The region abounds with iron.

Grape is important to the economy.

== Culture ==
Huaguxi is the most influential form of local theater.

== Transportation ==
The 319 National Highway continues into Yiyang City, linking Lijingpu Subdistrict to Yutan Subdistrict, Chengjiao Subdistrict and Jinghuapu Township.

== Celebrity ==
- Tao Shiyue, general.
