= Shuangjiangkou =

Shuangjiangkou Town 双江口镇
- Town
- Location in Hunan
- Coordinates: 28°20′17″N 112°39′56″E
- Country: People's Republic of China
- Province: Hunan
- Prefecture-level city: Changsha
- County-level city: Ningxiang

Area
  - Total: 155 km^{2} (60 sq mi)

Population (2015)
  - Total: 82,000
  - Density: 530/km^{2} (1,400/sq mi)
- Time zone: UTC+08:00 (China Standard)
- Postal code: 410601
- Area code: 0731

Chinese name
- Traditional Chinese: 雙江口鎮
- Simplified Chinese: 双江口镇
Transcriptions
Standard Mandarin
- Hanyu Pinyin: Shuāngjiāngkǒu Zhèn

Shuangjiangkou (Chinese: 双江口镇) is a rural town in Ningxiang City, Hunan Province, China. It is surrounded by Chengjiao Subdistrict and Jinghuapu Township on the west, Jinzhou Town and Lijingpu Subdistrict on the southeast, Zhuliangqiao Township, Gaotangling Subdistrict and Jinggang Town of Wangcheng District on the northeast, and Henglongqiao Town on the northwest. As of the 2000 census it had a population of 82,000 and an area of 155 square kilometres (60 sq mi).

== History ==
In December 2015, Zhuliangqiao Township was merged into Shuangjiangkou Town.

== Administrative divisions ==
The Town is divided into 13 villages and four communities:

- Shuangjiangkou Community (双江口社区)
- Xinxiang Community (新香社区)
- Shuangfu Community (双福社区)
- Baiyu Community (白玉社区)
- Tanshuwan (檀树湾村)
- Changxing (长兴村)
- Wuyi (五一村)
- Shanyuan (山园村)
- Shuangqing (双青村)
- Gaotiansi (高田寺村)
- Zuojiashan (左家山村)
- Zhuliangqiao (朱良桥村)
- Chaziqiao (槎梓桥村)
- Lianhuashan (莲花山村)
- Luoxiangxin (罗巷新村)
- Yunji (云济村)
- Xingjia (兴桂村)

== Geography ==
The Wei River, known as "Mother River" and a tributary of the Xiang River, flows through the town.

== Economy ==
Grape is important to the economy.

== Education ==
There are one senior high school located with the town limits: Ningxiang Eleventh Senior High School (宁乡十一中).

== Culture ==
Huaguxi is the most influential local theater.

== Transportation ==
The Changchang Highway (长常高速公路) running through Shuangjiangkou Town, Chengjiao Township, Jinghuapu Township. The Jinzhou Highway (金洲大道) from Yutan Subdistrict, running through Chengjiao Town, Shuangjiangkou Town, Jinzhou Town, to Yuelu District, Changsha City.

== Attractions ==
The town is famous for the tea.

== Celebrity ==
- Zhou Fengjiu (simplified Chinese: 周凤九; traditional Chinese: 周鳳九; pinyin: Zhōu Fèngjiǔ), scientist.
