= Jinghuapu Township =

Jinghuapu Township 菁华铺乡
- Township
- Location in Hunan
- Coordinates: 28°18′23″N 112°29′58″E
- Country: People's Republic of China
- Province: Hunan
- Prefecture-level city: Changsha
- County-level city: Ningxiang

Area
  - Total: 65.8 km^{2} (25.4 sq mi)

Population
  - Total: 3.2
  - Density: 0.049/km^{2} (0.13/sq mi)
- Time zone: UTC+08:00 (China Standard)
- Postal code: 410699
- Area code: 0731

Chinese name
- Traditional Chinese: 菁華鋪鄉
- Simplified Chinese: 菁华铺乡
Transcriptions
Standard Mandarin
- Hanyu Pinyin: Jīnghuápù Xiāng

Jinghuapu Township (Chinese: 菁华铺乡) is a rural township in Ningxiang City, Hunan Province, China. It is surrounded by Meitanba Town on the west, Yuejiaqiao Town on the north, Shuangjiangkou Town on the east, and Baimaqiao Subdistrict and Chengjiao Subdistrict on the south. As of the 2000 census it had a population of 31,569 and an area of 65.8 square kilometres (25.4 sq mi).

== Administrative divisions ==
The township is divided into six villages:

- Zhangshan (嶂山村)
- Chenjiaqiao (陈家桥村)
- Honglunshan (洪仑山村)
- Jinghuapu (菁华铺村)
- Fujiatang (傅家塘村)
- Taolinqiao (桃林桥村)

== Economy ==
Citrus, peach and tobacco are important to the economy.

== Culture ==
Huaguxi is the most influential form of local theatrical performance.

== Transportation ==
China National Highway 319, Hunan Provincial Highway 1824 (1824省道) and some county rural roads run through the town. The 319 National Highway runs from the township to Yiyang City. The G5513 Changsha–Zhangjiajie Expressway runs through Shuangjiangkou Town, Chengjiao Township, Jinghuapu Township. The Hunan Provincial Highway 1824 from Jinghuapu Township, runs through Meitanba Town to Taojiang County.
