= Zifu =

Zifu Town 资福镇
- Town
- Location in Hunan
- Coordinates: 28°06′13″N 112°25′50″E
- Country: People's Republic of China
- Province: Hunan
- Prefecture-level city: Changsha
- County-level city: Ningxiang

Area
  - Total: 87.4 km^{2} (33.7 sq mi)

Population
  - Total: 38,000
  - Density: 430/km^{2} (1,100/sq mi)
- Time zone: UTC+08:00 (China Standard)
- Postal code: 410618
- Area code: 0731

Chinese name
- Traditional Chinese: 資福鎮
- Simplified Chinese: 资福镇
Transcriptions
Standard Mandarin
- Hanyu Pinyin: Zīfú Zhèn

Zifu Town (Chinese: 资福镇) is a town in Ningxiang City, Hunan Province, China. It is surrounded by Shuangfupu Town and Huitang Town on the west, Batang Town on the northeast, Dachengqiao Town on the north, and Jinshi Town on the south. As of the 2000 census it had a population of 38,000 and an area of 87.4 square kilometres (33.7 sq mi).

== Administrative divisions ==
The town is divided into one community and seven villages:

- Yaoli Community (窑里社区)
- Huabao (华宝村)
- Heqing (合星村)
- Qingquanhe (清泉河村)
- Qixing (七星村)
- Tanmuqiao (檀木桥村)
- Hongqi (红旗村)
- Shanhu (珊瑚村)

== Geography ==
The Wu River, a tributary of the Wei River, flows through the town.

== Culture ==
Huaguxi is locally the most influential theatrical performance style.

== Transport ==
The town is connected to two county roads: County Road X096, which heads southwest to Huitang Town and northeast to Batang Town, and County Road X094.
