= Yutan Subdistrict =

Yutan Subdistrict 玉潭街道
- Subdistrict
- Location in Hunan
- Coordinates: 28°15′26″N 112°31′37″E
- Country: People's Republic of China
- Province: Hunan
- Prefecture-level city: Changsha
- County-level city: Ningxiang

Area
  - Total: 22.8 km^{2} (8.8 sq mi)

Population (2018)
  - Total: 244,000
  - Density: 10,700/km^{2} (27,700/sq mi)
- Time zone: UTC+08:00 (China Standard)
- Postal code: 410699
- Area code: 0731

Chinese name
- Chinese: 玉潭街道
Transcriptions
Standard Mandarin
- Hanyu Pinyin: Yùtán Jiēdào

Yutan Subdistrict (Chinese: 玉潭街道) is a subdistrict in Ningxiang City, Hunan Province, China. It borders Baimaqiao Subdistrict to the southwest, Chengjiao Subdistrict to the north and Lijingpu Subdistrict to the southeast. As of 2018, it has a population of 244,000 and an area of 22.8 square kilometres (8.8 sq mi).

== Administrative divisions ==
The Subdistrict is divided into nine communities: Bayi Community (八一社区), Chuwei Community (楚沩社区), Huaming Community (花明社区), Nanyuan Community (南苑社区), Tongyi Community (通益社区), Wenzhong Community (文中社区), Xiangshan Community (香山社区), Xincheng Community (新城社区), and Xue'an Community (学庵社区).

== Geography ==
Wei River, also known as "Mother River", is a tributary of the Xiang River that flows through the city.

== Education ==
Three senior high schools are located within the city: Ningxiang No. 1 High School (宁乡一中), Ningxiang Experimental Senior High School (宁乡县实验中学), and Yutan Experimental Senior High School (玉潭实验中学).

== Culture ==
Huaguxi is a popular form of theater.

== Transport ==
China National Highway 319 runs through the subdistrict, as do the G5513 Changsha–Zhangjiajie Expressway and 3 county rural roads: the 319 National Highway which continues into Yiyang City, linking Yutan with the Chengjiao Subdistrict and Jinghuapu Township; the Hunan Provincial Highway 1810 (1810省道) from Yutan which runs through Shuangfupu Town, Hengshi Town, Laoliangcang Town, Liushahe Town, Qingshanqiao Town and connects to Loudi City; and the Hunan Provincial Highway 1823 (1823省道) from Yutan which runs through Donghutang Town, Huaminglou Town and connects to Shaoshan City.

The Luoyang–Zhanjiang Railway, from Luoyang City, Henan Province, to Zhanjiang, Guangdong, runs through the city.

== Celebrities ==
- Huang Yali (simplified Chinese: 黄雅莉; traditional Chinese: 黃雅莉; pinyin: Huang Yǎlì), singer.
