= Chengjiao Subdistrict, Ningxiang =

Chengjiao Subdistrict 城郊街道
- Subdistrict
- Location in Hunan
- Coordinates: 28°15′40″N 112°34′20″E
- Country: People's Republic of China
- Province: Hunan
- Prefecture-level city: Changsha
- County-level city: Ningxiang

Area
  - Total: 22.8 km^{2} (8.8 sq mi)

Population
  - Total: 50,000
  - Density: 2,200/km^{2} (5,700/sq mi)
- Time zone: UTC+08:00 (China Standard)
- Postal code: 410699
- Area code: 0731

Chinese name
- Chinese: 城郊街道
Transcriptions
Standard Mandarin
- Hanyu Pinyin: Chéngjiāo Jiēdào

Chengjiao Subdistrict (Chinese: 城郊街道) is a rural subdistrict in Ningxiang City, Hunan Province, China. It is surrounded by Jinghuapu Township on the northwest, Shuangjiangkou Town on the northeast, Lijingpu Subdistrict on the southeast, and Yutan Subdistrict on the south. As of the 2000 census it had a population of 29,700 and an area of 22.8 square kilometres (8.8 sq mi).

== Administrative divisions ==
The subdistrict is divided into fourteen villages and one community: Wei Community (沩社区), Jinxing Village (金星村), Maotian Village (茆田村), Tangwan Village (塘湾村), He'an Village (合安村), Luohuan Village (罗宦村), Guanxin Village (关心村), Shiquan Village (石泉村), Mujia Village (木佳村), Xujialong Village (许家垅村), Yaoshi Village (钥匙村), Douzitan Village (蔸子潭村), Weifengba Village (沩丰坝村), Chatingsi Village (茶亭寺村) and Shitoukeng Village (石头坑村).

== Culture ==
Huaguxi is the most influential form of local theater.

== Transportation ==
The National Highway 319 continues into Yiyang City, linking Chengjiao Subdistrict to Jinghuapu Township.

The Jinzhou Highway (金洲大道) from Yutan Subdistrict, runs through Chengjiao Town, Shuangjiangkou Town and Jinzhou Town, to Yuelu District of Changsha City.

The G5513 Changsha-Zhangjiajie Expressway runs southeast through Jinzhou Town to Wangcheng District of Changsha, and the northwest to Heshan District of Yiyang.
