= China National Highway 319 =

Road in China

National Highway 319
- 319国道

Route information
- Length: 2,984 km (1,854 mi)

Major junctions
- From: Xiamen, Fujian
- To: Chengdu, Sichuan

Location
- Country: China

Highway system
- National Trunk Highway System; Primary; Auxiliary
← G318	→ G320

China National Highway 319 (G319) runs northwest from Xiamen, Fujian towards Jiangxi Province, Hunan Province, Chongqing, and ends in Chengdu, Sichuan. It is 2984 kilometres in length.

== Route and distance ==
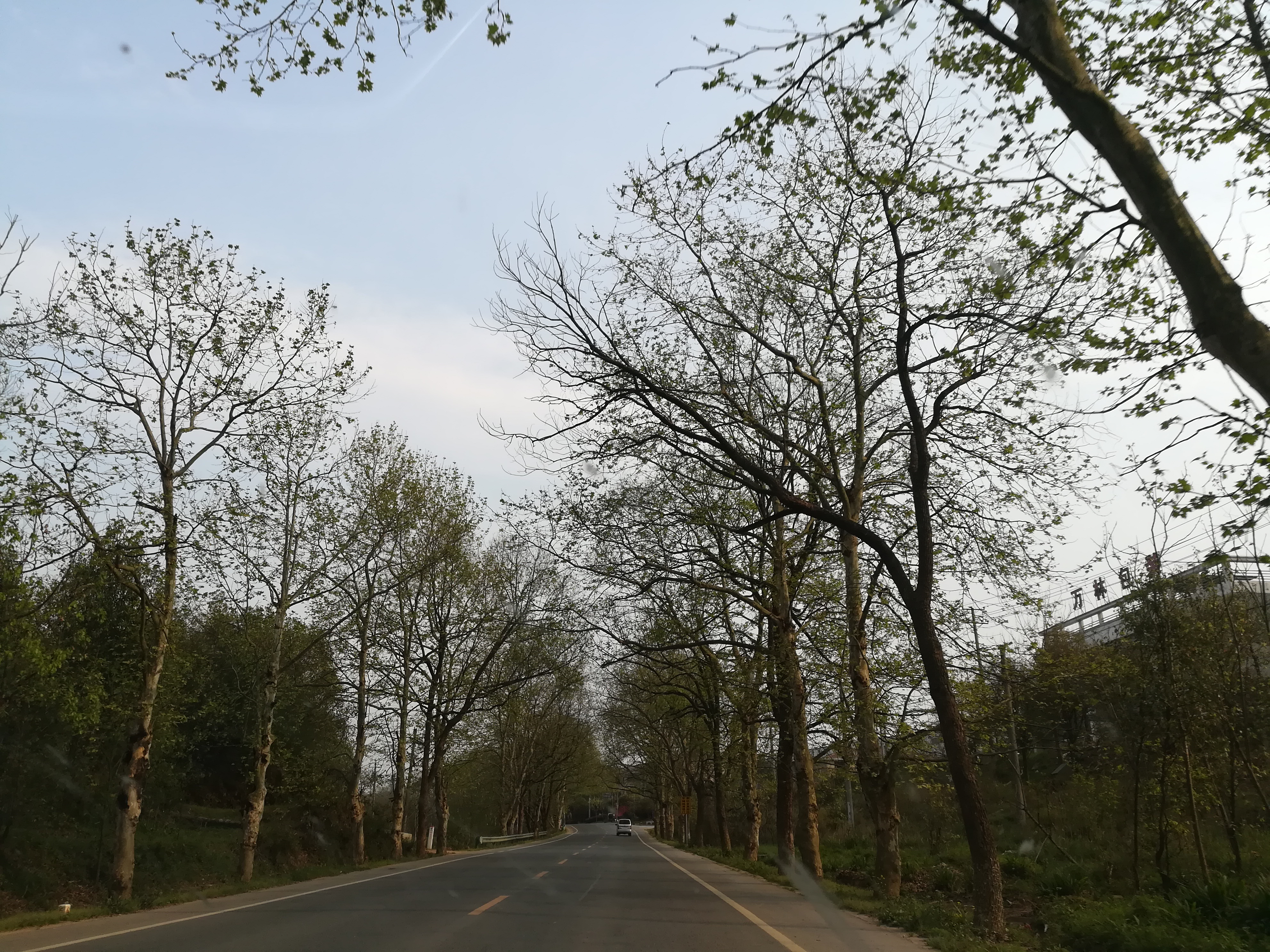
G319 in Yiyang, Hunan

Route and distance

City	Distance (km)
Xiamen, Fujian	0
Jimei District, Fujian	14
Zhangzhou, Fujian	69
Longyan, Fujian	208
Changting County, Fujian	379
Ruijin, Jiangxi	427
Ningdu, Jiangxi	510
Xingguo, Jiangxi	616
Taihe, Jiangxi	707
Jinggangshan, Jiangxi	793
Yongxin County, Jiangxi	928
Lianhua County, Jiangxi	988
Pingxiang, Jiangxi	1067
Shangli, Jiangxi	1107
Liuyang, Hunan	1144
Changsha, Hunan	1214
Ningxiang, Hunan	1261
Yiyang, Hunan	1312
Wuling District, Hunan	1405
Yuanling, Hunan	1589
Luxi County, Hunan	1644
Jishou, Hunan	1715
Huayuan County, Hunan	1785
Xiushan, Chongqing	1860
Youyang, Chongqing	1964
Qianjiang District, Chongqing	2081
Pengshui, Chongqing	2209
Wulong, Chongqing	2298
Fuling District, Chongqing	2420
Changshou, Chongqing	2502
Yubei District, Chongqing	2573
Chongqing, Chongqing	2599
Bishan County, Chongqing	2664
Tongliang, Chongqing	2705
Anyue, Sichuan	2802
Lezhi, Sichuan	2850
Jianyang, Sichuan	2911
Chengdu, Sichuan	2984

== See also ==
- China National Highways
