= Ningxiang =

Ningxiang 宁乡市 Ningsiang; Ninghsiang
- County-level city
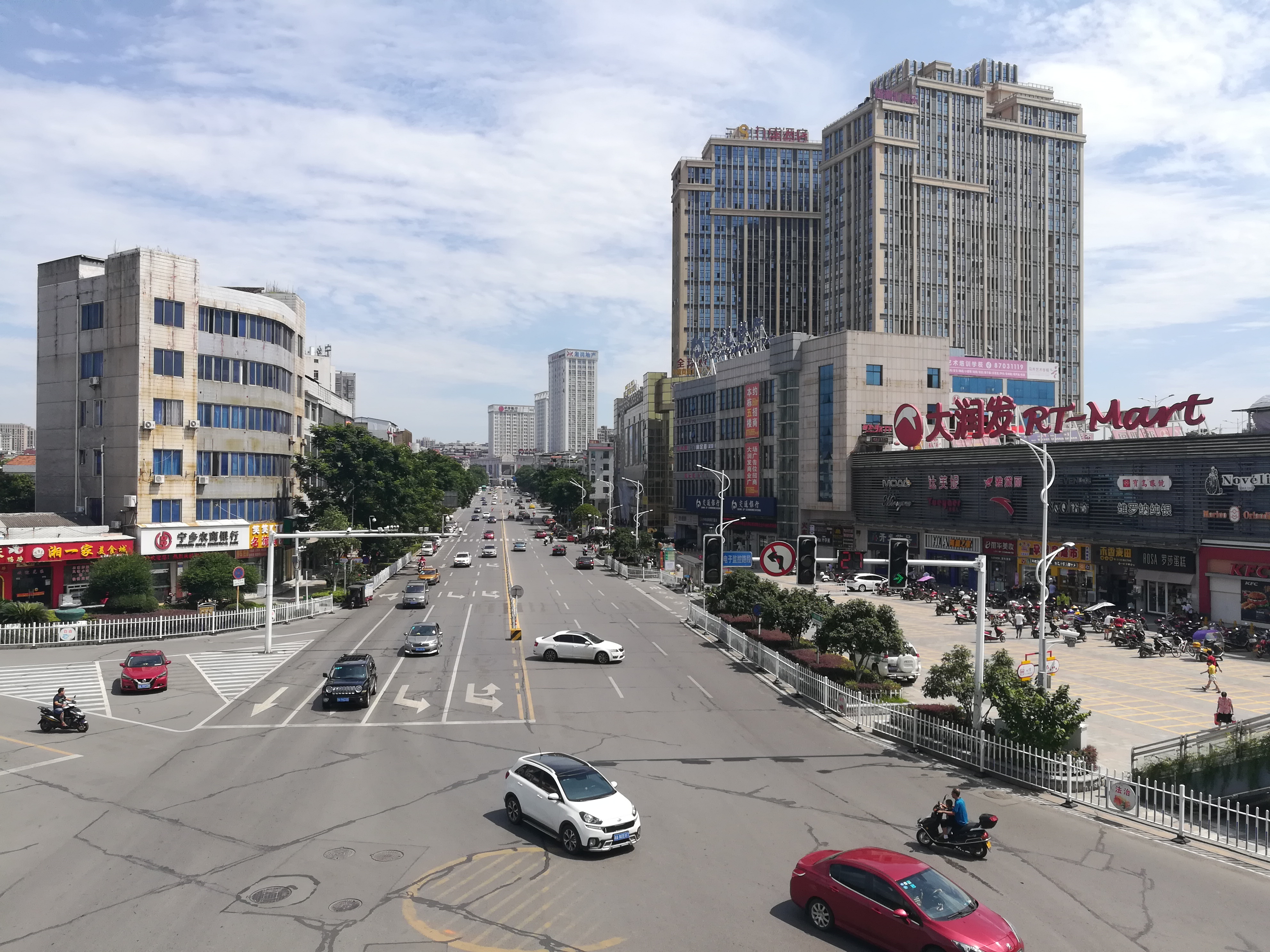

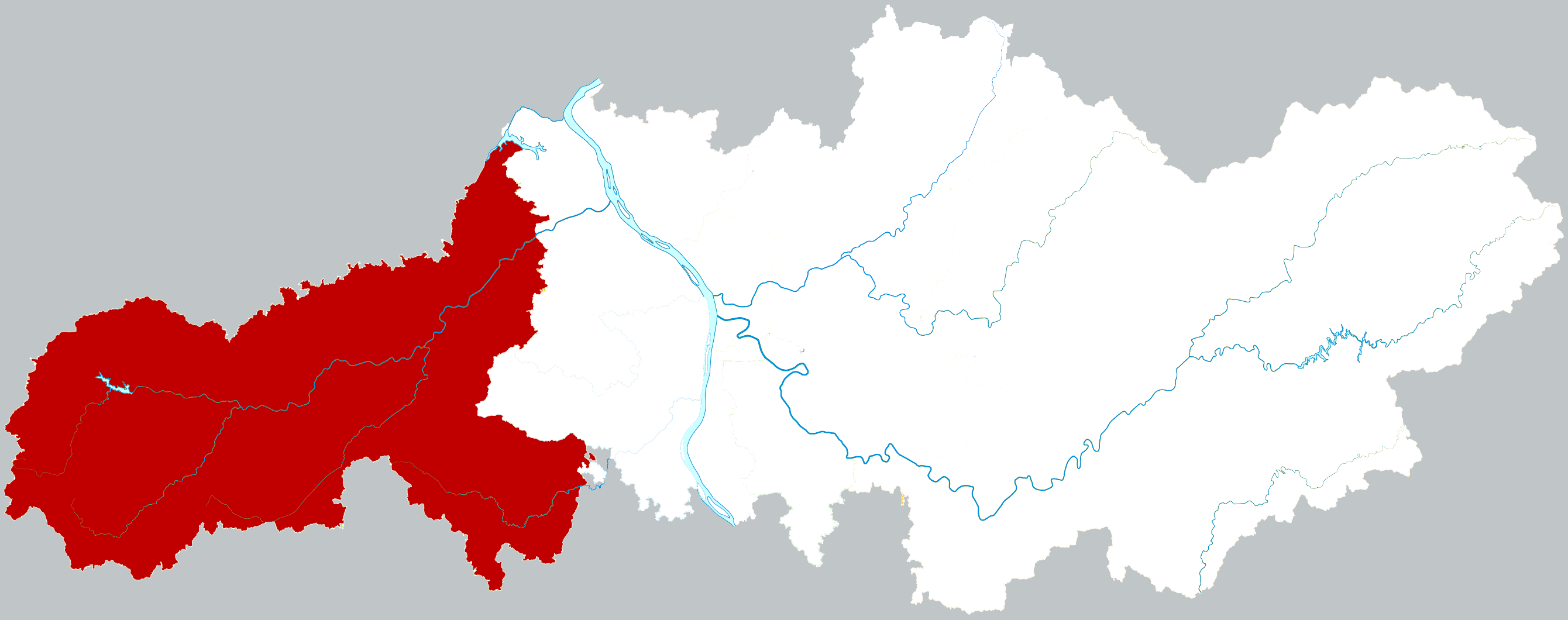
- Location of Ningxiang City within Changsha

- Location in Hunan
- Coordinates (Ningxiang government): 28°16′41″N 112°33′07″E
- Country: People's Republic of China
- Province: Hunan
- Prefecture-level city: Changsha
- Established: 627 (TangZhenguan)
- Seat: Yutan
- Township-level divisions: 4 subdistricts, 21 towns, 8 townships, and 1 district

Government
  - Communist Party Secretary: Yu Xinfan (于新凡)
  - Chairman of Ningxiang People's Congress: He Yinghui (贺应辉)
  - Mayor: Fu Xuming (付旭明)
  - Chairman of CPPCC Ningxiang Committee: Deng Jieping (邓杰平)

Area
  - Total: 2,906 km^{2} (1,122 sq mi)
- Highest elevation: 884 m (2,900 ft)
- Lowest elevation: 127.2 m (417 ft)

Population (August 2012)
  - Total: 1,368,117
  - Density: 470.8/km^{2} (1,219/sq mi)
- Time zone: UTC+8 (China Standard)
- Postal code: 410600
- Area code: (0)731
- Website: www.nxgov.com/zfmh/index.html

Ningxiang (simplified Chinese: 宁乡市; traditional Chinese: 寧鄕市; pinyin: Níngxiāng Shì; lit. 'peaceful home') is a county-level city and the second most populous county-level division in the province of Hunan, China; it is under the administration of the prefecture-level city of Changsha. The city is bordered to the north by Heshan District of Yiyang and Taojiang County, to the west by Anhua County and Lianyuan City, to the south by Louxing District of Loudi, Xiangxiang City, Shaoshan City and Yuhu District of Xiangtan, to the east by Yuelu and Wangcheng Districts. Located in the central east of Hunan Province, Ningxiang covers 2,906 km^{2} (1,122 sq mi) with a registered population of 1,393,528 and a resident population of 1,218,400 (as of 2014). The city has 4 subdistricts, 21 towns and 4 townships under its jurisdiction, its administrative centre is at Yutan Subdistrict (玉潭街道).

The most famous historic resident was Liu Shaoqi, who lived in Ningxiang from 1898 until 1920, before he went to Beijing as President.

The city is famous for its tourism as the home of attractions like He Shuheng's Former Residence, Xie Juezai's Former Residence, Liu Shaoqi's Former Residence, Baiyun Temple, Miyin Temple, and Puji Temple.

== Archeology ==
Ningxiang was a site of spectacular Shang archaeological finds

In 2004, a Chinese team excavated ruins from the Western Zhou period (11th century-771BC) at Tanheli. The findings were of a city site that included two large yellow earth artificial building sites and two even larger sites that may have been palace dwellings. Remnants of moats were found both inside and outside the city. In the highlands outside the city were excavated seven small tombs for nobles and lords which contained many bronze culture implements as well as those made of jade. The site was listed in Beijing as one of the top ten archeological discoveries of 2004.

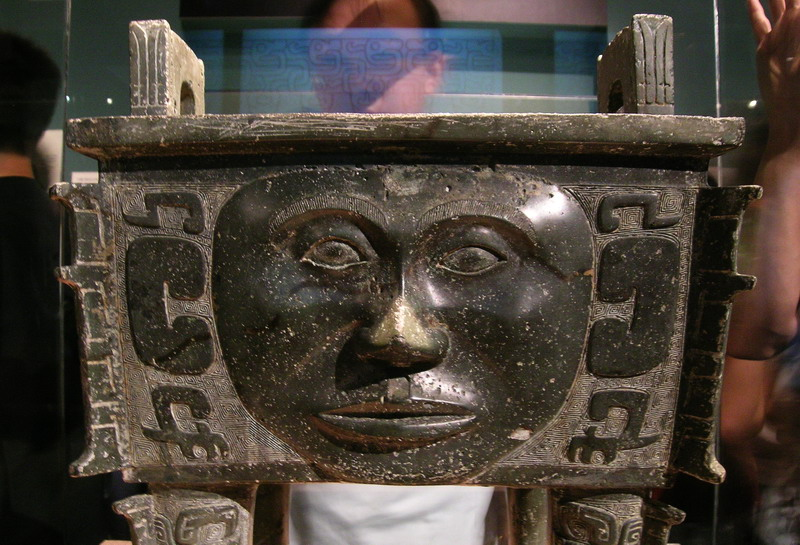
The Da He ding, a Shang dynasty bronze ding vessel decorated with a human face, unearthed at Zhaizishan, Huangcai Town, Ningxiang County in 1959, and displayed at the Hunan Provincial Museum.

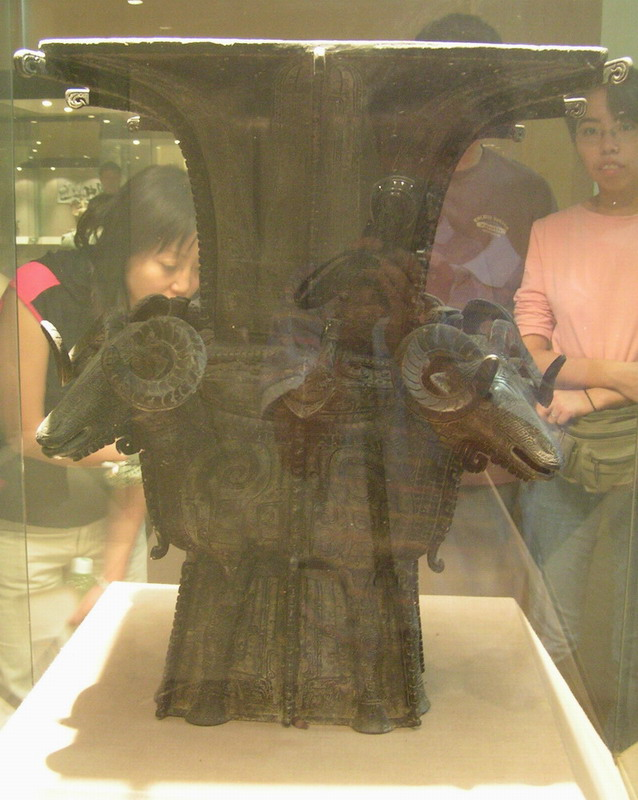
The Siyangfangzun, a zun vessel of the later Shang Dynasty discovered by Jiang Jingsu (姜景舒) and his other two brothers in April 1938 at Zhuanerlun hillside (转耳仑山腰), Huangcai town, Ningxiang County, and displayed at the National Museum of China.

== History ==
=== Imperial period ===
Human habitation in Ningxiang dates back to ancient times. The earliest archaeological remains so far unearthed are the Four-goat Square Zun and Dahe Renmianwen Square Ding from Tanheli site at Huangcai Town, dating back to the late Shang dynasty (11th–10th century BC). In the Warring States (475–221 BC) period, Ningxiang was under the jurisdiction of Qianzhongjun (黔中郡) of Chu State (1115–223 BC).

After conquering all the states, Emperor Qin Shi Huang implemented the system of prefectures and counties in 221 BC. Ningxiang belonged to Changshajun (长沙郡).

In the Han dynasty (202 BC–220 AD), Ningxiang was under the jurisdiction of Yiyang County and Xiangyin County.

In the Three Kingdoms period (220–280), king of Wu State (222–280), Sun Quan, seized Jingzhou, Ningxiang came under the jurisdiction of Wu State. In 257, the imperial court set up the Xinkang County, and Changqiao (now Hengshi) became the seat of the county administration.

In the Tang dynasty (618–907), the imperial court established a granary in today's Laoliangcang Town. Buddhism was introduced into Ningxiang some time in the 9th century. According to Wu Deng Hui Yuan (《五灯会元》), in 806, the prime minister Pei Xiu submitted a written statement to the imperial court, which was approved to found the Miyin Temple at the foot of Mount Wei. His son, Pei Wende (裴文德), a former zhuangyuan, received ordination as a monk with the Dharma name of "Jinshan Fahai" (金山法海). The character of Fahai in the Legend of the White Snake is based on him. Liu Dui, the first jinshi in the history of Ningxiang, also known as "jinshi of Ningxiang for the first time" (破天荒进士).

In the 2nd year of Tiancheng Period (927) of the Later Tang dynasty (923–936), the King of Chu, Ma Yin, founded the Chu Kingdom (927–963). He set up three counties of Yiyang, Changsha and Xiangxiang in Ningxiang area. Xinkangyi (新康驿) was renamed Yutan Town, when it has a pond like a jade.

In the Song dynasty (960–1279), Yi Fu, the first Ningxiang people won the title of "wenzhuangyuan" (文状元), and he was appointed as the title of "Founding Man of Ningxiang" (宁乡开国男).

In the early Yuan dynasty (1271–1368), Ningxiang came under the jurisdiction of Tanzhou (潭州), and then under the jurisdiction of Tanzhoulu (潭州路).

In June of the 5th year of Hongwu Period (1372) of the Ming dynasty (1368–1644), Tanzhou was renamed as Changshafu (长沙府), and Ningxiang under its jurisdiction.

In the 4th year of Shunzhi Period (1647) of the Qing dynasty (1644–1911), Gao Shijun (高士浚) led his army to conquer Changsha and Ningxiang was incorporated into the territory of Qing Empire. Changshafu was set up, affiliated to Hu-Guang province and possessed 12 counties, including Ningxiang. In the late Qing dynasty, Zhu Yidian (朱衣点) joined the Taiping Army in Zhushi Bridge with his troops, he had fought many battles in Jiangxi, Zhejiang and Fujian, and was awarded the title of "Xiaotian Yiwang" (孝天义王) and "Fuchao Tianjun" (扶朝天军).

=== 20th century ===
In 1922, Ningxiang belonged to Hunan province.

On June 18, 1944, Changsha was captured by the Imperial Japanese Army. The Imperial Japanese Army attacked Ningxiang from Yiyang and Qiaokou (乔口), a battalion of 58th Division of 74th Army of the Chinese Nationalist Army held the Wei River bank, they blazed away at the enemy until the supplies were exhausted. They fought hand to hand with the enemy, but they were practically wiped out in the battle, known as the "Battle of Hill of Du Family" (血战杜家山).

On February 9, 1949, Jiang Yaxun (姜亚勋) and Li Shiqiu (李石秋) led the Huang-Tang Uprising (黄唐起义) in both towns of Huangcai and Tangshi. They published the Letter to the People of Central Hunan (告湘中人民书) and the Open Letter to Cheng Qian (致程潜的公开信). On August 4, Ningxiang was captured by the 436th Regiment of 146th Division of 49th Army of the PLA 4th Field Army, which was led by Cui Rongtai (崔荣泰) and Wang Qiao (王侨). On August 27, the People's Government of Ningxiang County was set up.

After the establishment of the Communist State in October 1949, Ningxiang was under the jurisdiction of Yiyang Zhuanqu (益阳专区; 'Yiyang Special Administrative Region'). From 1952 to November 1962, Ningxiang belonged to Xiangtan Zhuanqu (湘潭专区; 'Xiangtan Special Administrative Region'), and then belonged to Yiyang Zhuanqu till June 1983, while the county was under jurisdiction of Changsha.

=== 21st century ===
In 2017, Ningxiang was upgraded to a county-level city.

== Administrative division ==
According to the result on adjustment of township-level administrative divisions of Ningxiang county on November 19, 2015, Fengmuqiao township and Xieleqiao town merged to Huitang town, Nantianping township merged to Batang town, and Zhuliangqiao township merged to Shuangjiangkou town. Ningxiang county has 4 townships, 21 towns and 4 subdistricts under its jurisdiction.

Name	Chinese character	Population (2005)	Area (Km2)	Note
Qingshanqiao	青山桥镇	49,000	71.8	
Liushahe	流沙河镇	69,000	140.57	
Yutan Subdistrict	玉潭街道	200,000	20	
Daolin	道林镇	56,000	135	
Huaminglou	花明楼镇	51,000	112.4	
Donghutang	东湖塘镇	47,000	138	
Xiaduopu	夏铎铺镇	37,000	103.4	
Xieleqiao	偕乐桥镇	21,000	72.5	
Shuangfupu	双凫铺镇	47,000	62.9	
Meitanba	煤炭坝镇	53,000	73.4	
Batang	坝塘镇	41,000	107	
Huitang	灰汤镇	23,000	43	
Shuangjiangkou	双江口镇	38,000	89.5	
Laoliangcang	老粮仓镇	63,000	121.8	
Xiangzikou	巷子口镇	42,000	105.8	
Longtian	龙田镇	21,000	72.5	
Hengshi	横市镇	50,000	123	
Huilongpu	回龙铺镇	37,000	71.8	
Huangcai	黄材镇	62,000	220	
Jinzhou	金洲镇	31,000	62.1	
Dachengqiao	大成桥乡	43,000	106.2	
Zhuliangqiao Township	朱良桥乡	33,000	82.72	
Jinghuapu Township	菁华铺乡	32,000	65.8	
Nantianping Township	南田坪乡	27,000	64	
Zifu	资福镇	38,000	87.4	
Fengmuqiao Township	枫木桥乡	38,000	72.6	
Yujia'ao Township	喻家坳乡	39,000	96.85	
Shatian Township	沙田乡	34,000	74.22	
Baimaqiao Subdistrict	白马桥街道	50,000	22.8	
Lijingpu Subdistrict	历经铺街道	34,000	35	
Chengjiao Subdistrict	城郊街道	50,000	22.8	
Weishan Township	沩山乡	14,000	42.8	

== Geography ==
Ningxiang County is located in the middle of Hunan province. The county has a total area of 2,903.52 square kilometres (1,121.06 sq mi). The county is bordered by Wangcheng District, to the east, Xiangtan County, to the Southeast, Shaoshan, Xiangxiang, Lianyuan, and Loudi, to the south, Anhua County, to the west, Taojiang County and Yiyang, to the North.

=== Climate ===
Ningxiang County is in the monsoon-influenced humid subtropical climate zone and exhibits four distinct seasons. Spring and fall are warm, while winter is chilly with cold winds. Winter temperatures average around 5 °C (41 °F). Summers are very hot and dry with a July daily average of 29 °C (84 °F).

Climate data for Ningxiang, elevation 75 m (246 ft), (1991–2020 normals, extremes 1981–present)
Month	Jan	Feb	Mar	Apr	May	Jun	Jul	Aug	Sep	Oct	Nov	Dec	Year
Record high °C (°F)	23.9 (75.0)	29.9 (85.8)	32.8 (91.0)	35.7 (96.3)	35.7 (96.3)	37.6 (99.7)	39.6 (103.3)	41.2 (106.2)	38.0 (100.4)	35.2 (95.4)	31.6 (88.9)	24.9 (76.8)	41.2 (106.2)
Mean daily maximum °C (°F)	8.4 (47.1)	11.4 (52.5)	15.8 (60.4)	22.4 (72.3)	26.8 (80.2)	30.0 (86.0)	33.4 (92.1)	32.6 (90.7)	28.3 (82.9)	23.0 (73.4)	17.3 (63.1)	11.2 (52.2)	21.7 (71.1)
Daily mean °C (°F)	5.0 (41.0)	7.6 (45.7)	11.7 (53.1)	17.8 (64.0)	22.4 (72.3)	25.9 (78.6)	29.2 (84.6)	28.3 (82.9)	23.9 (75.0)	18.4 (65.1)	12.8 (55.0)	7.3 (45.1)	17.5 (63.5)
Mean daily minimum °C (°F)	2.5 (36.5)	4.9 (40.8)	8.7 (47.7)	14.4 (57.9)	18.9 (66.0)	22.9 (73.2)	25.9 (78.6)	25.2 (77.4)	20.7 (69.3)	15.2 (59.4)	9.6 (49.3)	4.4 (39.9)	14.4 (58.0)
Record low °C (°F)	−7.6 (18.3)	−9.3 (15.3)	−2.4 (27.7)	2.1 (35.8)	9.6 (49.3)	13.1 (55.6)	19.4 (66.9)	16.7 (62.1)	11.6 (52.9)	2.2 (36.0)	−2.0 (28.4)	−10.8 (12.6)	−10.8 (12.6)
Average precipitation mm (inches)	75.8 (2.98)	88.0 (3.46)	155.8 (6.13)	178.4 (7.02)	202.4 (7.97)	218.6 (8.61)	165.4 (6.51)	117.5 (4.63)	86.1 (3.39)	66.0 (2.60)	78.3 (3.08)	54.6 (2.15)	1,486.9 (58.53)
Average precipitation days (≥ 0.1 mm)	13.6	14.2	17.3	16.0	16.0	14.4	10.6	10.8	9.8	10.5	10.7	11.4	155.3
Average snowy days	5.1	2.9	0.6	0	0	0	0	0	0	0	0.2	1.9	10.7
Average relative humidity (%)	79	79	80	78	78	80	74	76	78	77	77	76	78
Mean monthly sunshine hours	72.9	73.5	91.3	124.6	148.9	153.2	234.8	211.8	158.6	137.1	118.6	105.0	1,630.3
Percentage possible sunshine	22	23	24	32	35	37	56	53	43	39	37	33	36
Source: China Meteorological Administration

=== Rivers ===
The Wei River flows through Ningxiang County and has seven major tributaries: Huangjuan River, Duan River, Mei River, Tiechong River, Yutang River, Chu River and Wu River.

The Jin River flows through Ningxiang County to Xiangtan, is one of the largest tributaries of the Xiang River.

=== Lakes and reservoirs ===
The Huangcai Reservoir, also known as "Qingyang Lake", is a large reservoir located in the northwestern part of Ningxiang County. It is the largest body of water in Ningxiang County and the largest reservoir in Ningxiang County.

The Tianping Reservoir, also known as "Qingshan Lake", is a large reservoir located in the western part of Ningxiang County. It is the second largest body of water in Ningxiang County and the second largest reservoir in Ningxiang County.

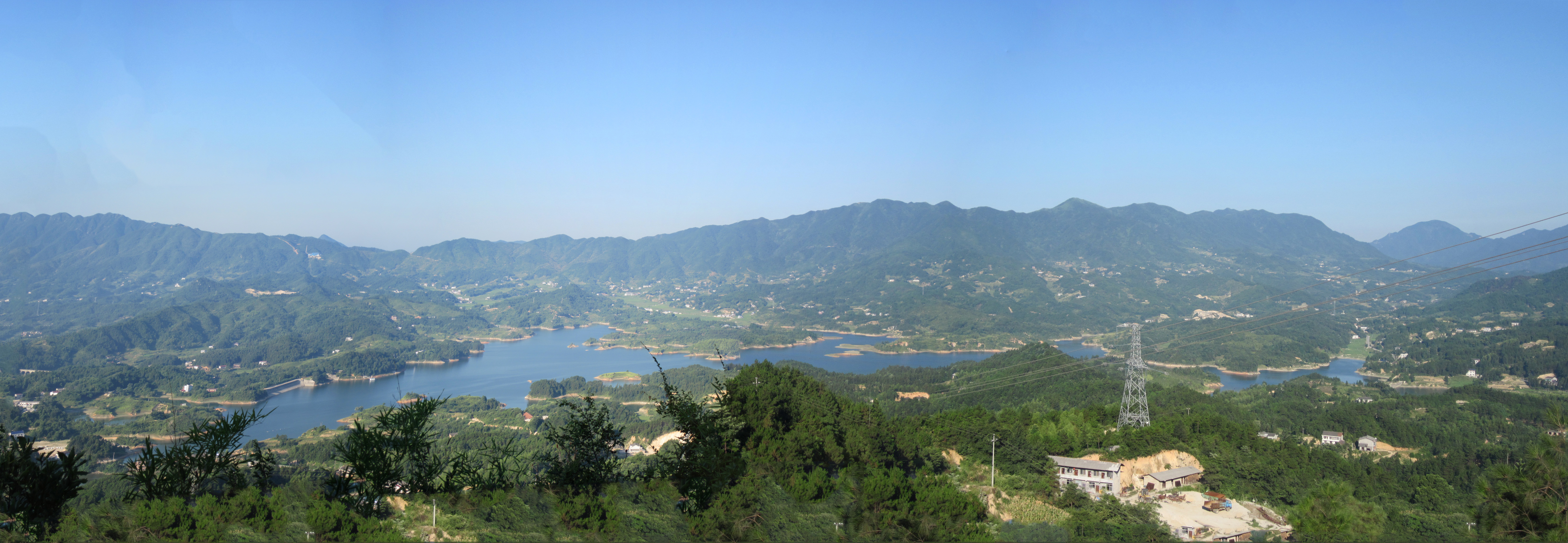
A panoramic view of the Tianping Reservoir

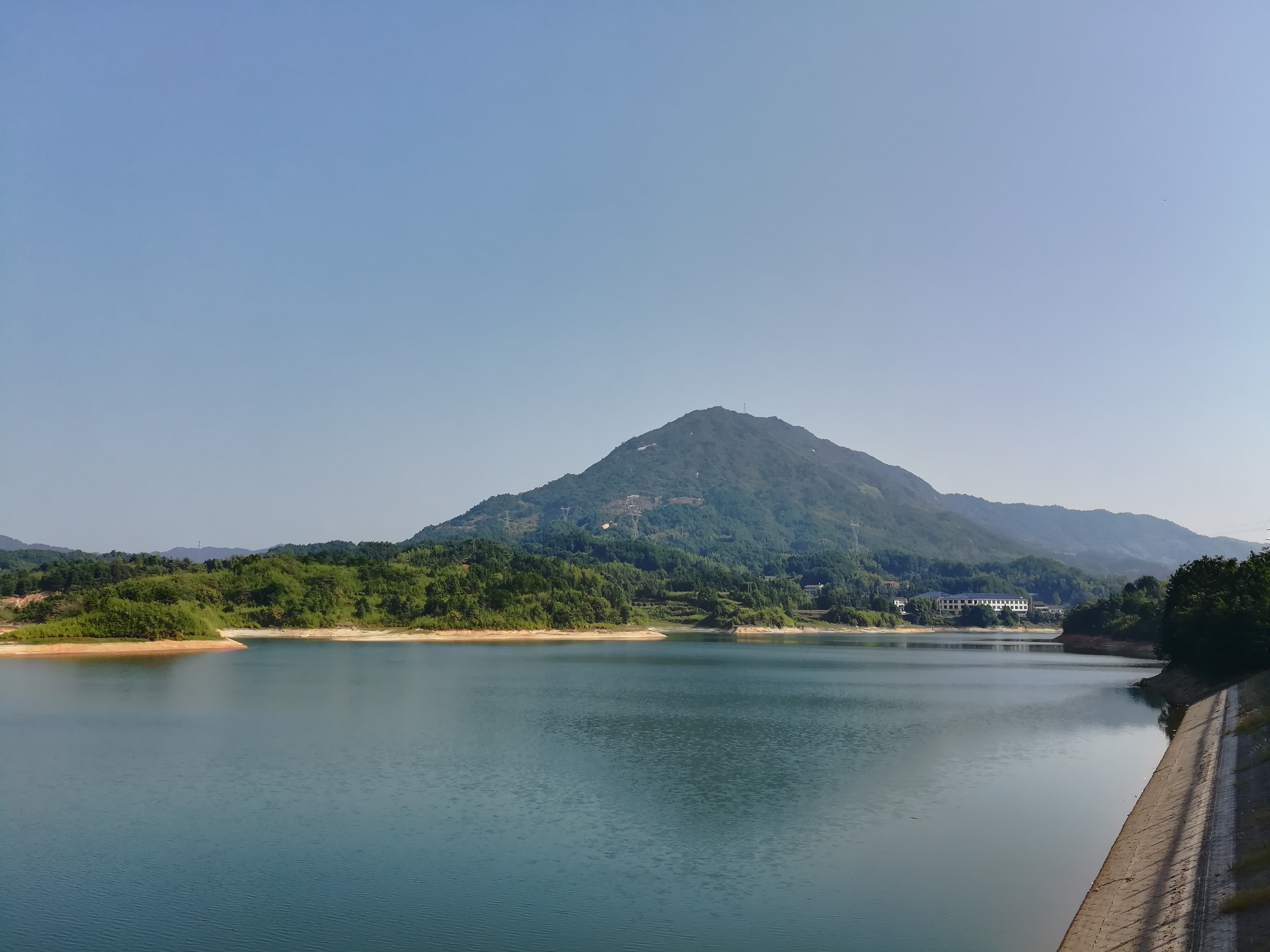
View of Mount Furong from the Tianping Reservoir dam

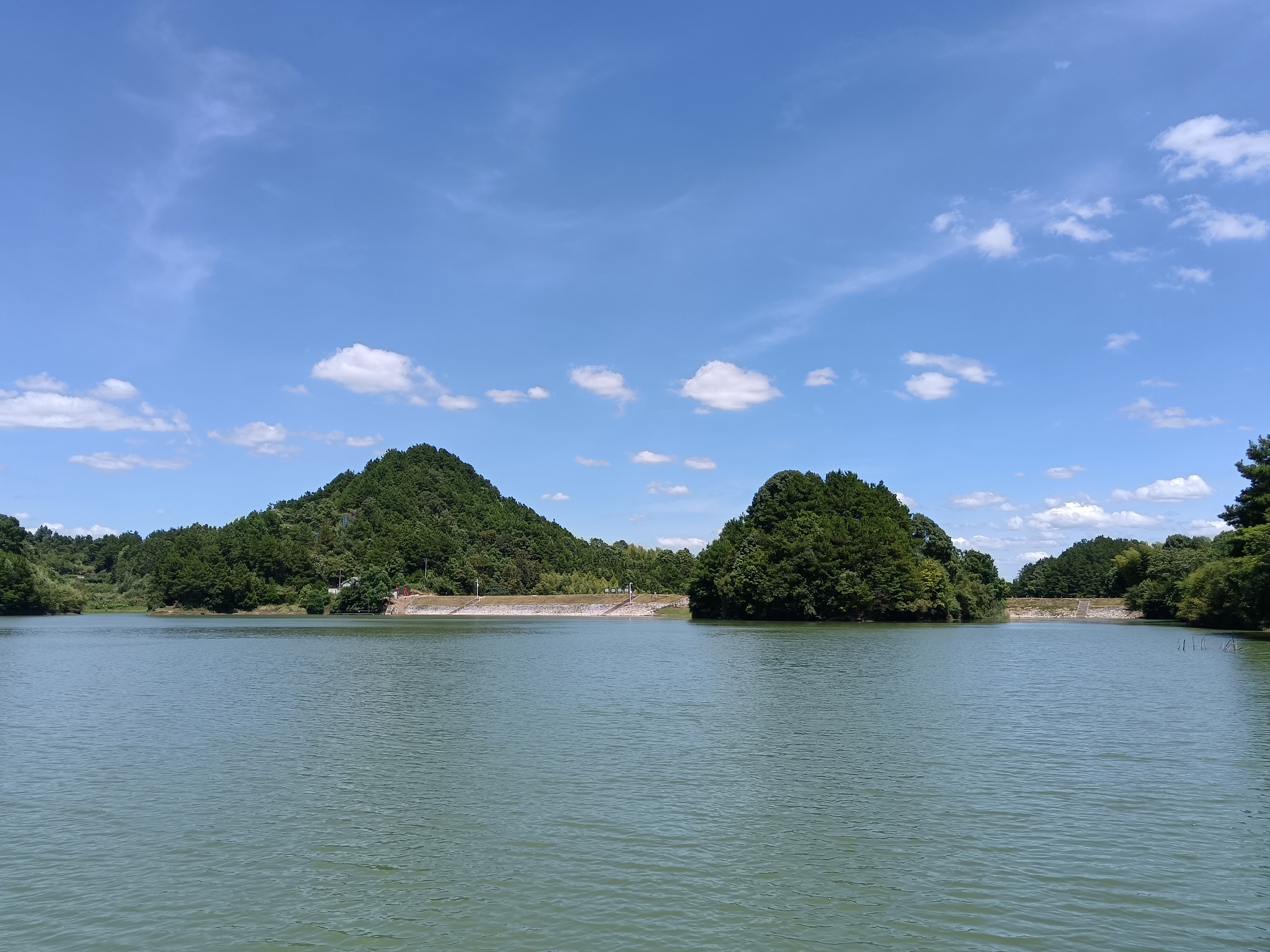
Qiguan Reservoir, Liushahe

=== Mountains ===
The highest natural elevation in Ningxiang County is 1071m at Wazizhai (瓦子寨).

== Government ==
The current CPC Party Secretary of Ningxiang is Yu Xinfan and the current mayor is Fu Xuming. He Yinghui is the Chairmen of Ningxiang People's Congress, which is the equal of Head of Parliament. The Chairmen of CPPCC Ningxiang Committee is Deng Jieping.

== Economy ==
Ningxiang is one of the most developed counties in Hunan, it ranked the 18th in the Top100 of counties and county-level cities of China by comprehensive strength in 2020. It is one of the best developed manufacturing counties and county-level cities in the province, the manufacturing industry is its economic pillar. Ningxiang's economic engines are food and beverage, Advanced equipment manufacturing, new materials, modern services industry, machinery manufacture and clothing. For example, of 2015, the gross domestic product of Ningxiang County was CN¥100.22 billion (US$16.09 billion), Of this total, the value added of the manufacturing industry was CN¥61.31 billion (US$9.84 billion), shares 61.18 percent of its GDP.

Ningxiang County has a variety of industries, such as the Wangbuliao Clothing, Sundance Clothing, Tsingtao Brewery, Jiajia Food, and Sany. The county's manufacturing products include paper, technological equipment, automobiles, food, clothing and other goods. The service sector of the county's economy includes things like banking, health care, construction, communications, education, tourism and government. Tourism comprises a large part of Ningxiang County's economy, with 20 million visitors spending ¥2 billion in 2014.

According to preliminary accounting of the statistical authority, the gross domestic product of Ningxiang City in 2017 was 122,445 million yuan (18,135 million US dollars), up by 10.3 percent over the previous year. Of this total, the value added of the primary industry was 12,382 million yuan (1,834 million US dollars), up by 3.9 percent, that of the secondary industry was 80,666 million yuan (11,947 million US dollars), up by 10.6 percent and that of the tertiary industry was 29,397 million yuan (4,354 million US dollars), up by 12.5 percent. The value added of the primary industry accounted for 10.11 percent of the GDP; that of the secondary industry accounted for 65.88 percent; and that of the tertiary industry accounted for 24.01 percent. The per capita GDP in 2017 was 96,118 yuan (14,236 US dollars).

=== Development zone ===
The Ningxiang Economic and Technological Development Zone (NETZ) consists of parts of Chengjiao, Shuangjiangkou and Jinghuapu of Ningxiang County. It was created on 10 January 1998 and upgraded to an ETZ at state level on 11 November 2010. The main industries in the zone consists of Food and Drink, Advanced Material, advanced equipment manufacturing, health product and cosmetics. As of 2016, its builtup area covers 25 km^{2} (9.7 sq mi), the total gross output of scale-sized industries hits 97.07 billion yuan (US$14.61 billion).

== Demographics ==
=== Population ===
As of 2012, the National Bureau of Statistics of China estimates the county's population now to be 1,368,117.

=== Language ===
Mandarin is the official language. The local people speak both Changsha dialect and Ningxiang dialect.

=== Religion ===
The county government supports all religions. As of 2015, the majority of people in Ningxiang are atheists. Of those who are religious, most follow Chinese folk religion. Only 3% of Ningxiang people are Buddhists, 1% are Taoists, and 1% are Roman Catholics or Protestants.

== Education ==
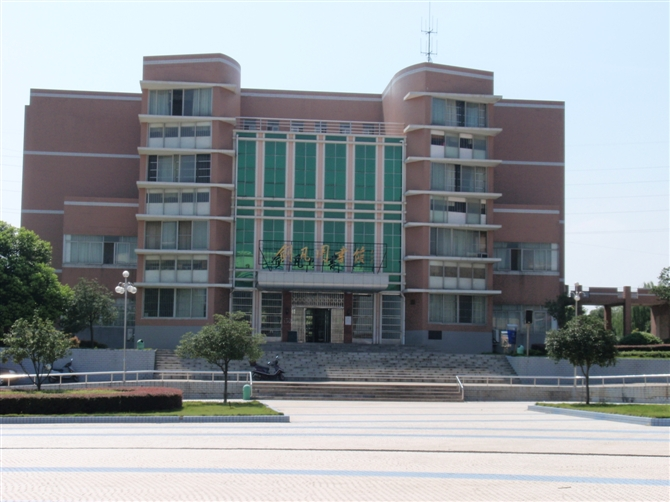
Jianfan Library of First High School of Ningxiang.

Ningxiang County has its own laws regulating education. The county government require young people to attend school. The age limits vary: six to fifteen. Every child in the county is guaranteed up to 9 years of education (Chinese: 九年义务教育). Filling classroom from kindergarten to the twelfth grade, they attend classes for an average of five hours a day, five days a week, until the beginning of the following summer.

Ningxiang County's students pass through several levels of schooling, and thus, several curricula, on their way to a high school diploma. They attend:

- Elementary School. The Elementary School usually means grade 1 through 6. And grades 7, 8, and 9 make up what is called an "Elementary Middle School". Ningxiang County has more than 200 public schools and more than 100 public middle schools. Almost every elementary school provides instruction in these subjects: Chinese language (it includes reading, grammar, composition, and literature), English language, mathematics, science, history, geography, biology, ideological and political, computer, art, music, and physical education.
- Secondary School. The Secondary School generally means grade 10-12. These grades are popularly called "High School". Secondary schools offer these subjects: Chinese language, English language, mathematics, physics, chemistry, biology, history, geography, political, computer, and physical education. Ningxiang County has 16 public high schools.

== Transportation ==
=== Rail ===
The Luoyang–Zhanjiang Railway, more commonly known as "Luzan Railway", from Luoyang City, Henan Province to Zhanjiang City, Guangdong Province, through Ningxiang.

The Shanghai–Kunming high-speed railway passes through the southeastern Ningxiang's Datunying Town and Daolin Town.

The Shimen–Changsha railway passes across the northeastern Ningxiang's Jinzhou Town and Chengjiao Subdistrict.

=== Expressway ===
The G5513 Changsha–Zhangjiajie Expressway runs west to east through Chengjiao Subdistrict and Jinzhou Town.

The S71 Yiyang–Loudi–Hengyang Expressway, also popularly known as "Yilouheng Expressway", runs north-south through western Ningxiang, passing through the towns of Qingshanqiao, Liushahe, Laoliangcang, Hengshi, Yujia'ao to Yiyang connects to S50 Changsha–Shaoshan–Loudi Expressway at Fanjiang Town of Xiangxiang.

The S50 Changsha–Shaoshan–Loudi Expressway, locally known as "Changshaolou Expressway", travels through the southern Ningxiang, leading eastwards to Yuelu District of Changsha and westwards to Louxing District of Loudi.

The Shaoshan Expressway passes north through Datunying Town and connects to S50 Changsha–Shaoshan–Loudi Expressway at Huaminglou Town.

=== National Highway ===
The National Highway G319, commonly abbreviated as "G319", is a northwest-southeast highway passing through the city’s downtown, commercial, and industrial districts in the eastern part of the city.

=== Provincial Highway ===
The Provincial Highway S206 passes through the northern Ningxiang's Jinghuapu Township and Meitanba Town.

The Provincial Highway S208 runs north to south through the eastern Ningxiang's Lijingpu Subdistrict, Xiaduopu Town, Batang Town, Donghutang Town, and Datunying Town.

The Provincial Highway S209 is a major northeast-southwest highway that runs through many of towns and subdistricts in Ningxiang, such as Yutan Subdistrict, Baimaqiao Subdistrict, Huilongpu Town, Dachengqiao Town, Shuangfupu Town, Hengshi Town, Laoliangcang Town, Liushahe Town, and Qingshanqiao Town.

The Provincial Highway S311, runs southeast to northwest through southwestern Ningxiang, and is connected to Provincial Highway S209 at Qingshanqiao Town.

== Culture ==
Ningxiang has four famous characteristic cultures. They are:

- Huaguxi(花鼓戏)
- Weiguzixi(围鼓子戏)
- GuanyindianExi(观音殿额戏)
- Gushihui(故事会)

== Tourism ==
Ningxiang County's most visited Buddhist temple is Miyin Temple, which was built in Tang dynasty (618–907) in Weishan Township, the county is also known for Puji Temple and Shangliu Temple in Qingshanqiao Town, and Baiyun Temple in Huilong Mountain.

Huitang Hot Spring is a popular attraction.

The Former Residence of Liu Shaoqi, Former Residence of Xie Juezai, and Former Residence of He Shuheng are well-known tourist spots.

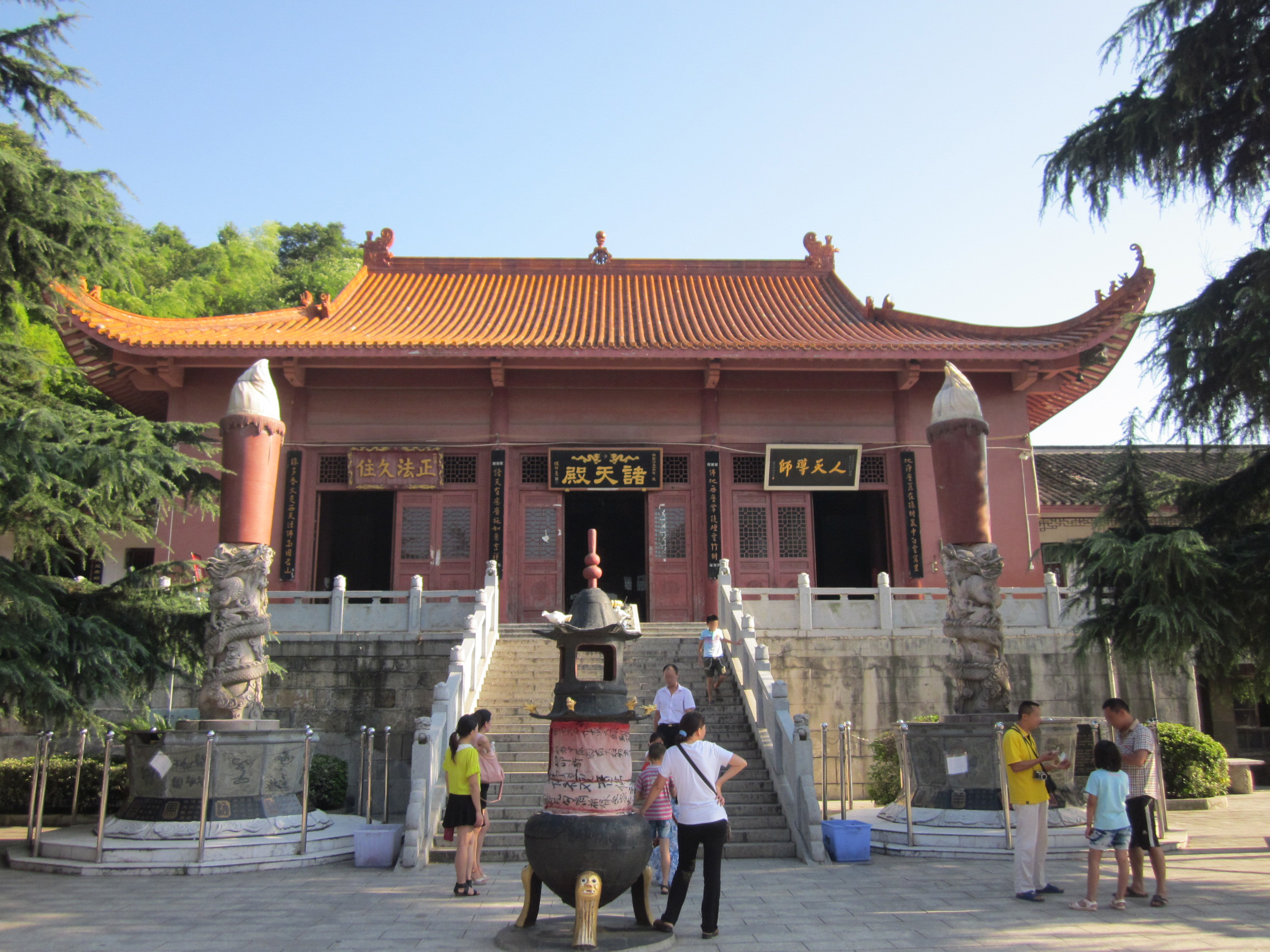
Baiyun Temple

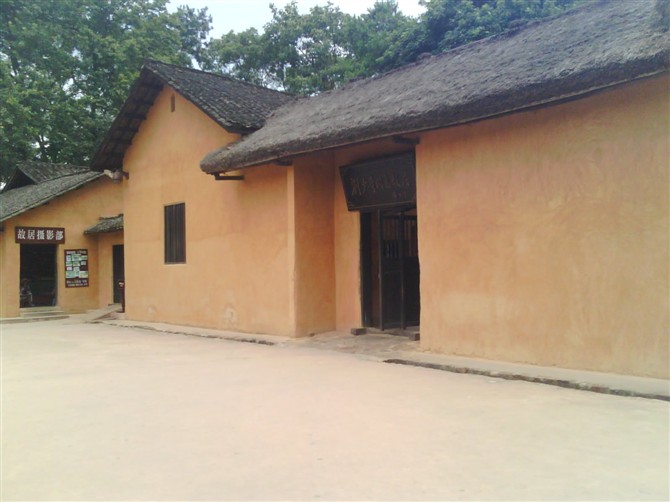
Liu Shaoqi's Former Residence

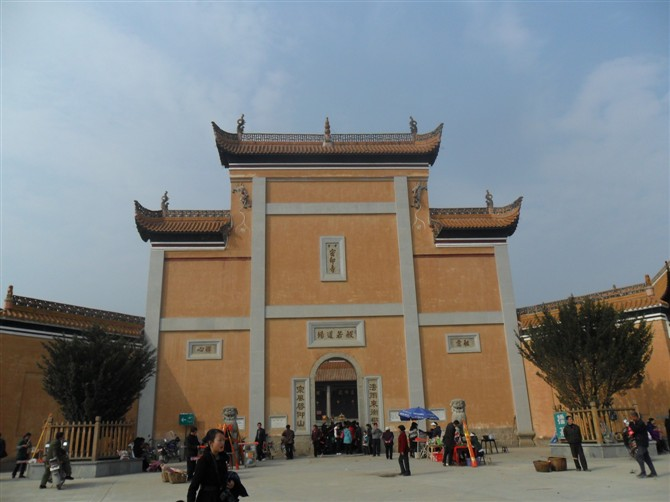
Miyin Temple

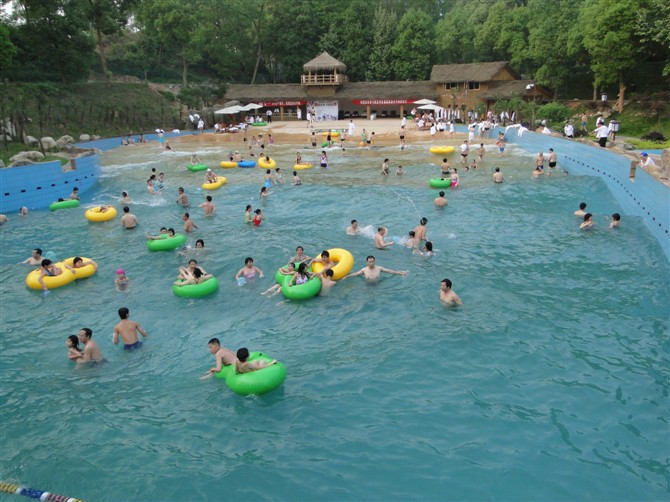
Huitang Hot Spring

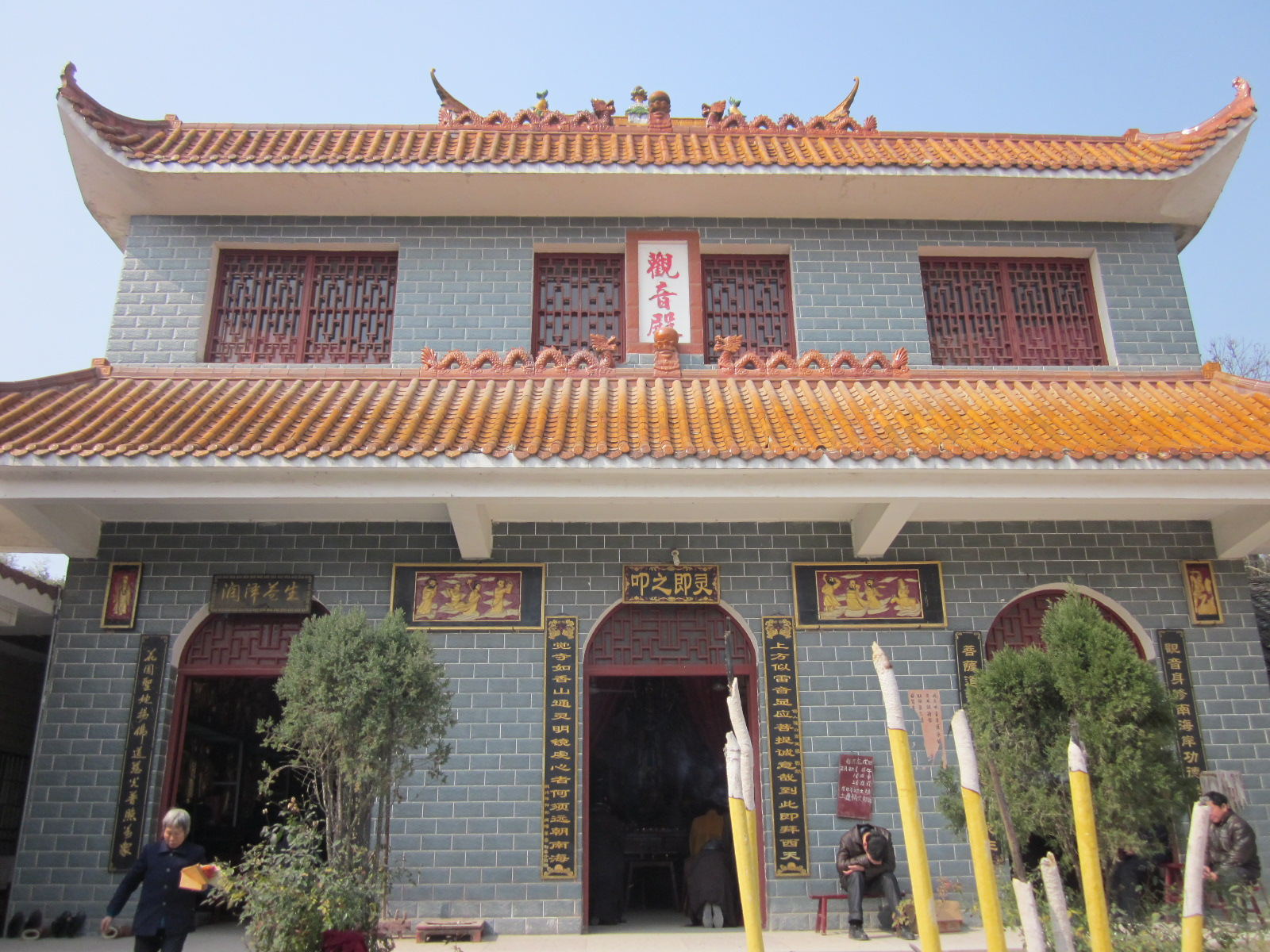
Shangliu Temple

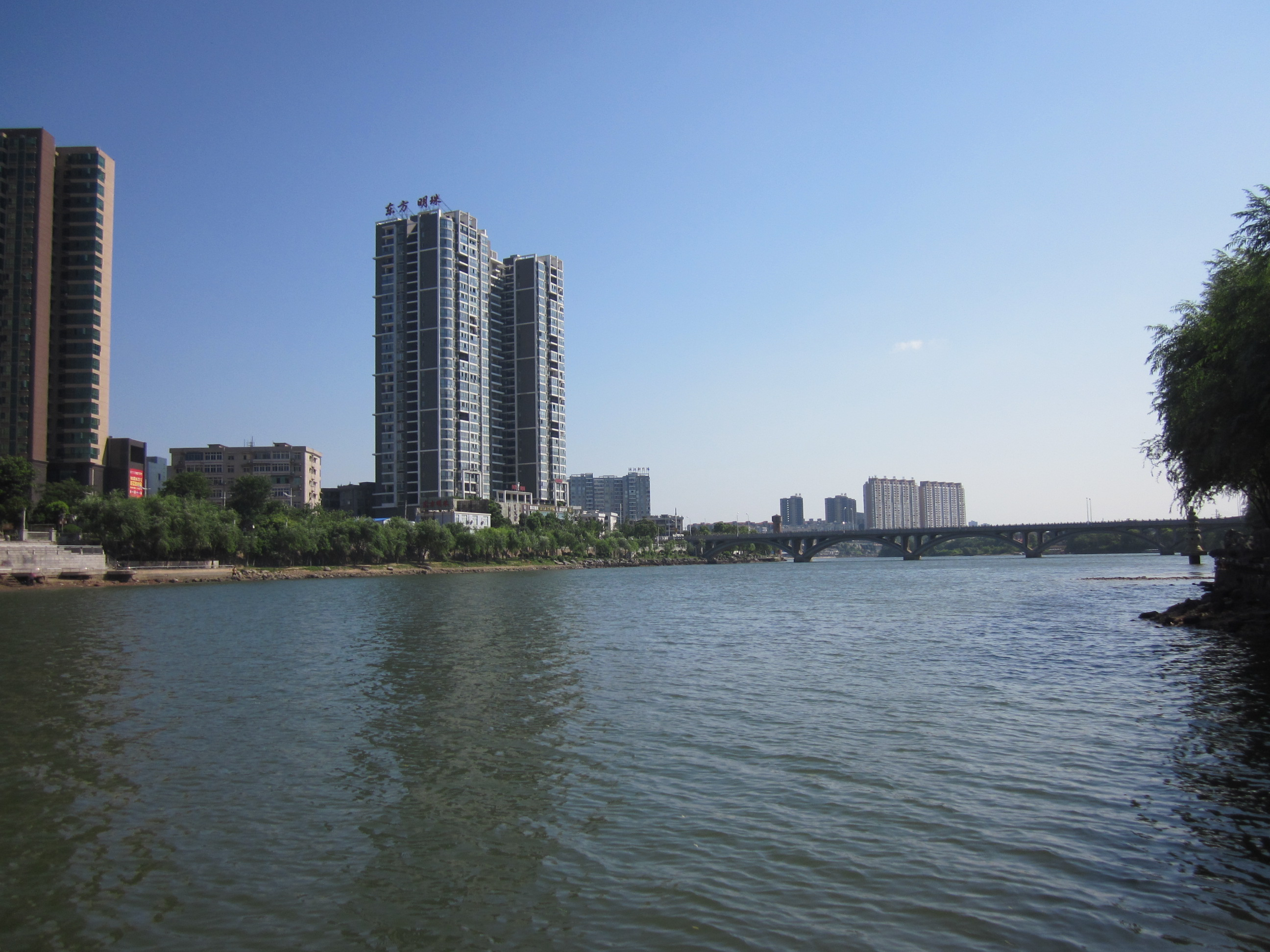
Wei River

== Notable people ==
Ningxiang County is the birthplace of:

- Gan Siqi - one of only 57 generals bestowed the honour of being a "founding general" of the People's Republic of China.
- He Shuheng - a proletarian revolutionary in modern China.
- Huang Yali - a pop singer who earned sixth place in the 2006 Super Girl contest.
- Ray Huang - a historian and philosopher best known in his later years for the idea of macro-history.
- Li Zehou - a scholar of philosophy and intellectual history who currently resides in the United States.
- Liu Shaoqi - a former president of China. His former residence is now a museum.
- Liu Yuan - one of sons of Liu Shaoqi, a general and the political commissar of the People's Liberation Army General Logistics Department.
- Lu Diping - a military general and politician.
- Lu Li - a gymnast best known for her gold medal on the uneven bars in the 1992 Summer Olympics in Barcelona.
- Qi Xueqi - a famous Anti-Japanese commander of the Kuomintang (KMT).
- Tang Sulan - a writer and politician.
- Tao Zhiyue - a Kuomintang general during the Second Anti-Japanese War.
- Tong Enzheng - an archaeologist, historian, designer, and science fiction author.
- Xiang Zhejun - a jurist and prosecutor at International Military Tribunal for the Far East.
- Xie Juezai - former Deputy Secretary of the Central Commission for Discipline Inspection.
- Xie Fei - son of Xue Juezai, a world-recognized Chinese film director.
- Ye Xiaowen - former director of the State Administration for Religious Affairs
- Zhou Guangzhao - former President of Chinese Academy of Sciences.
- Zhou Shuguang - a blogger and citizen journalist best known for traveling around China to document injustice done to citizens.
