= G5513 Changsha–Zhangjiajie Expressway =

Road in China

Changsha–Zhangjiajie Expressway
- 长沙－张家界高速公路
- Changzhang Expressway 长张高速公路

Route information
- Auxiliary route of G55
- Existed: 2005–present

Major junctions
- East end: West 2nd Ring Road and Yuelu Road, Changsha, Hunan
- West end: Lishui Bridge, Yongding Road, Zhangjiajie, Hunan

Location
- Country: China

Highway system
- National Trunk Highway System; Primary; Auxiliary; National Highways; Transport in China
← G5512	→ G5515

The G5513 Changsha–Zhangjiajie Expressway (Chinese: 长沙—张家界高速公路), commonly referred to as the Changzhang Expressway (Chinese: 长张高速公路), is an expressway in China that connects Changsha, Hunan and Zhangjiajie, Hunan. The expressway is a spur of G55 Erenhot–Guangzhou Expressway and is entirely in Hunan Province.

It connects the following prefecture-level cities, all of which are in Hunan Province:

- Changsha
- Yiyang
- Changde
- Zhangjiajie
