= Wushi, Xiangtan =

Wushi Town 乌石镇
- Town
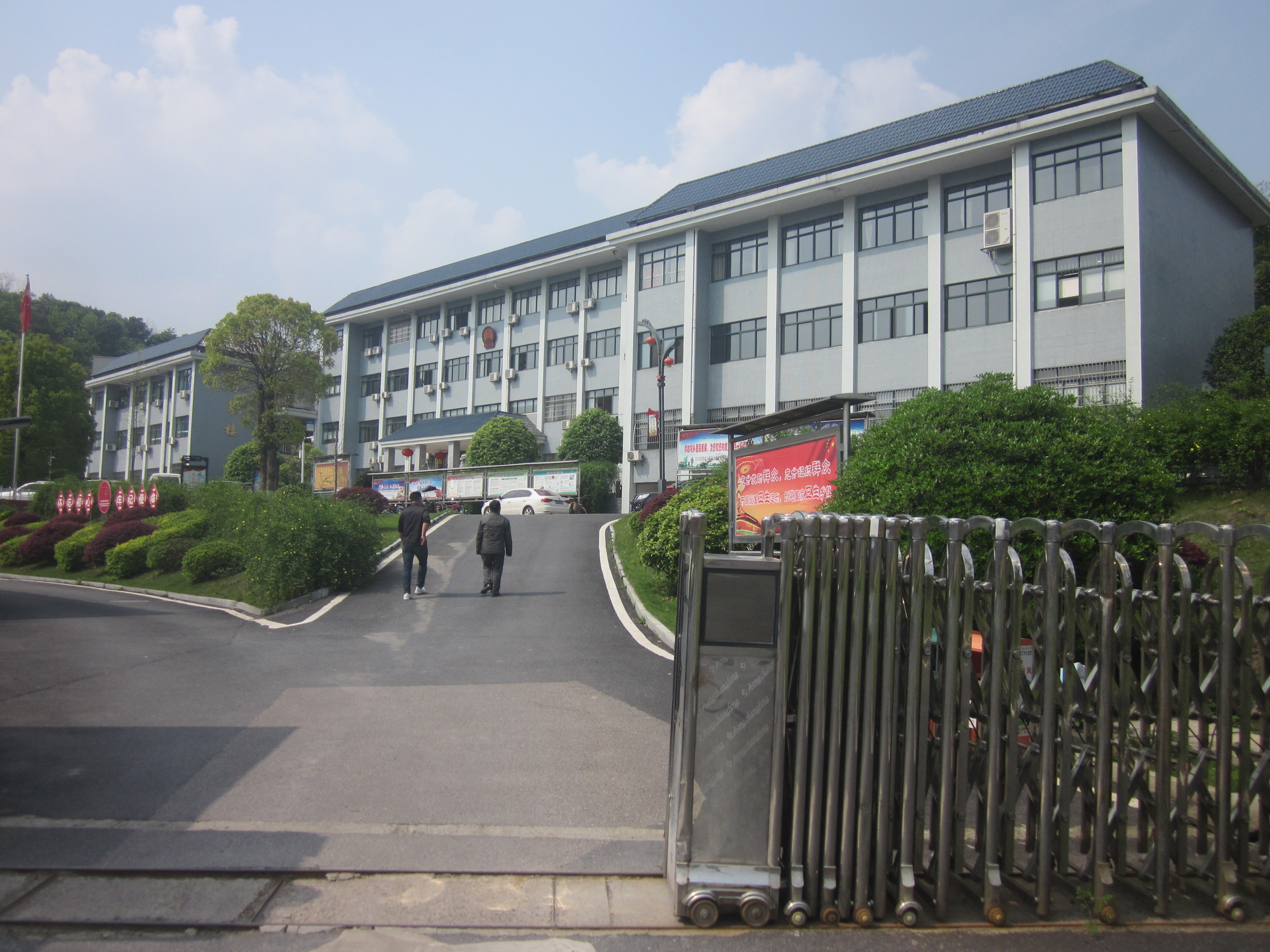
- Government building.

- Location in Hunan.
- Coordinates: 27°41′39″N 112°40′00″E
- Country: People's Republic of China
- Province: Hunan
- Prefecture-level city: Xiangtan
- County: Xiangtan County
- Incorporated (township): 1995
- Designated (town): 1998

Area
  - Total: 96.12 km^{2} (37.11 sq mi)

Population (2017)
  - Total: 27,143
  - Density: 282.4/km^{2} (731.4/sq mi)
- Time zone: UTC+08:00 (China Standard)
- Postal code: 411209
- Area code: 0732

Wushi Town (simplified Chinese: 乌石镇; traditional Chinese: 烏石鎮; pinyin: Wūshí Zhèn) is a town in Xiangtan County, Hunan, China. It's surrounded by Xiangxiang City Town on the west, Paitou Township on the north, Jinshi Township on the east, and Shitan Town on the south. As of the 2017 census it had a population of 27,143 and an area of 96.12 square kilometres (37.11 sq mi).

== Administrative divisions ==
As of 2017, the town is divided into thirteen villages and one community, which include the following areas:

- Waziping Community (瓦子坪社区)
- Daming (大明村)
- Shuangmiao (双庙村)
- Wushi (乌石村)
- Pingshan (平山村)
- Yuechongqiao (岳冲桥村)
- Hualong (华龙村)
- Tianlong (天龙村)
- Zhongxing (众兴村)
- Jinxiu (锦绣村)
- Shifeng (石峰村)
- Wushifeng (乌石峰村)
- Jingquan (景泉村)
- Simei (四美村)

== History ==
In the Qing dynasty (1644–1911), it belonged to Yisu Township (易俗乡).

In 1935, it came under the jurisdiction of the 8th District.

After the establishment of the Communist State, in 1950, it was under the jurisdiction of the 6th District. In 1958, the townships of Baituo (白托乡), Wushi and Jingquan (景泉乡) merged to form the Weiguo People's Commune (卫国人民公社). In 1995, former Wushi Township and Jingquan Township merged to form Wushi Township. In 1998 it was upgraded to a town. On November 17, 2017, it was listed among the fifth group of "National Civilized Villages and Towns" by the Central Guidance Commission on Building Spiritual Civilization of the Central Committee of the Chinese Communist Party. On September 19, 2019, it was designated as a "National Health Town" (国家卫生镇) by the National Patriotic Health Campaign Committee.

== Geography ==
It lies at the southwestern of Xiangtan County, bordering Xiangxiang to the west, Paitou Township to the south, Shitan Town to the north, and Jinshi Township to the east.

The town enjoys a subtropical humid monsoon climate, enjoying four distinct seasons and abundant precipitation. The average annual temperature is 18 °C (64 °F) and total annual rainfall is 1,350-millimetre (53 in).

Wushi Peak (乌石峰) is the scenic spot in the town, which, at 377.5 metres (1,239 ft) above sea level. It is one of the 72 peaks of Heng Mountains.

== Economy ==
Tea, corn, daylily and peanut are important to the economy.

== Demographics ==
Population census
Year	Pop.	±%
2000	37,583	—
2017	27,143	−27.8%

As of 2017, the National Bureau of Statistics of China estimates the township's population now to be 27,143.

== Attractions ==
The Former Residence of Peng Dehuai, was built in Qing dynasty, also a scenic spot in the town.

== Culture ==
Huaguxi is the most influential local theater.

== Transport ==
The G0421 Xuchang–Guangzhou Expressway is a north–south highway in the town.

== Celebrity ==
- Peng Dehuai, a prominent Chinese Communist military leader, and served as China's Defense Minister from 1954 to 1959.

== Gallery ==
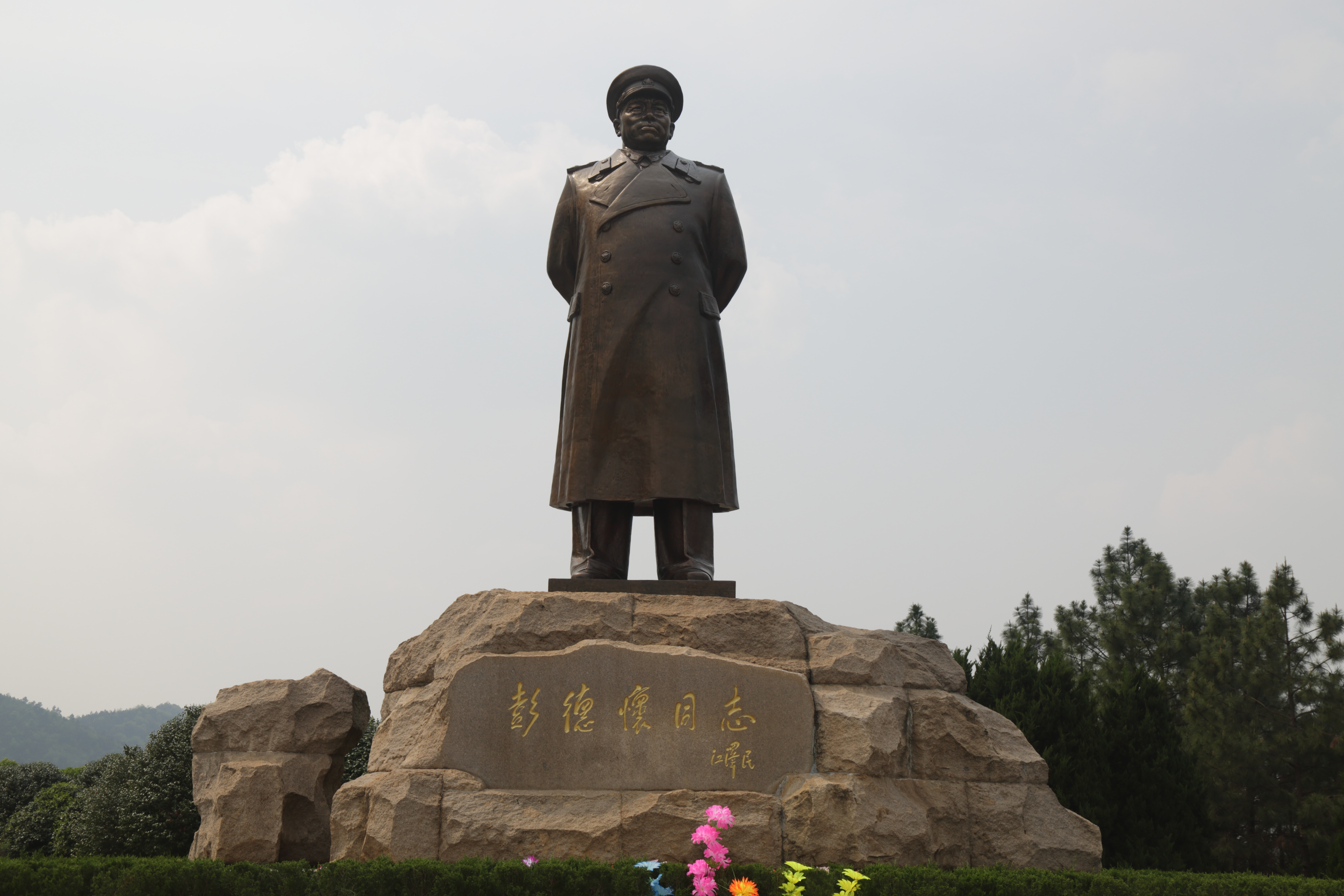
Bronze statue of Peng Dehuai

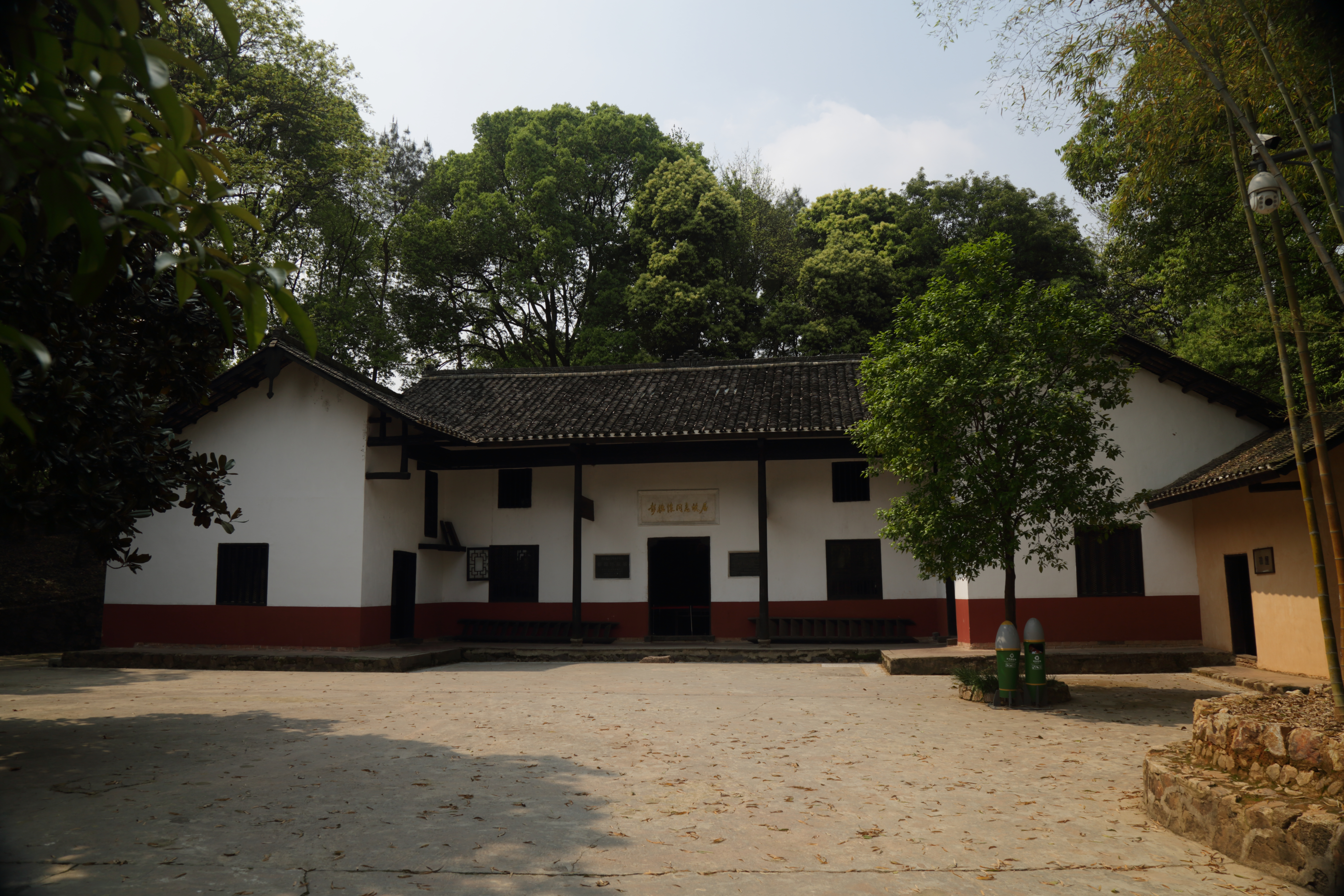
Peng Dehuai's house

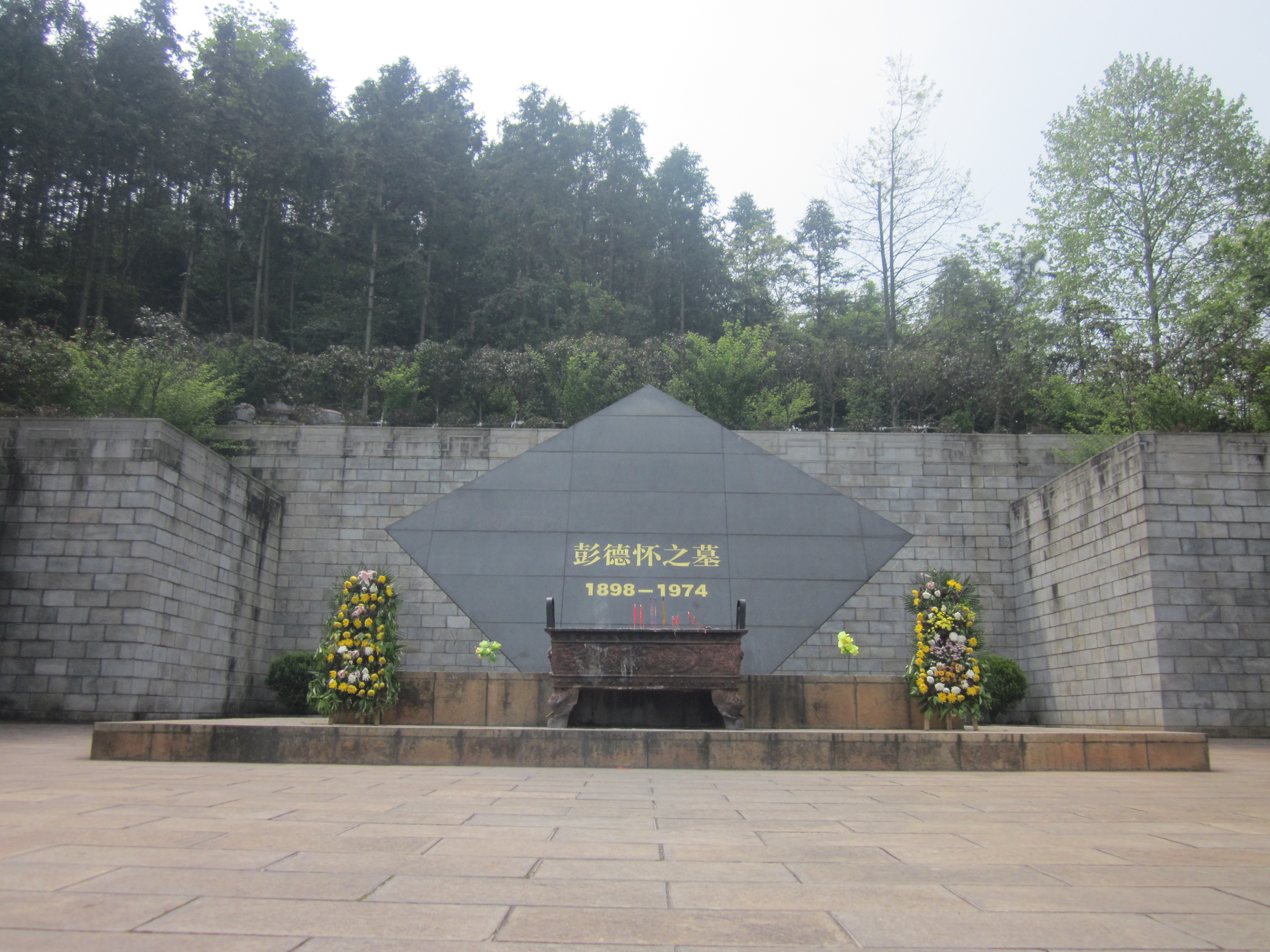
Tomb of Peng Dehuai

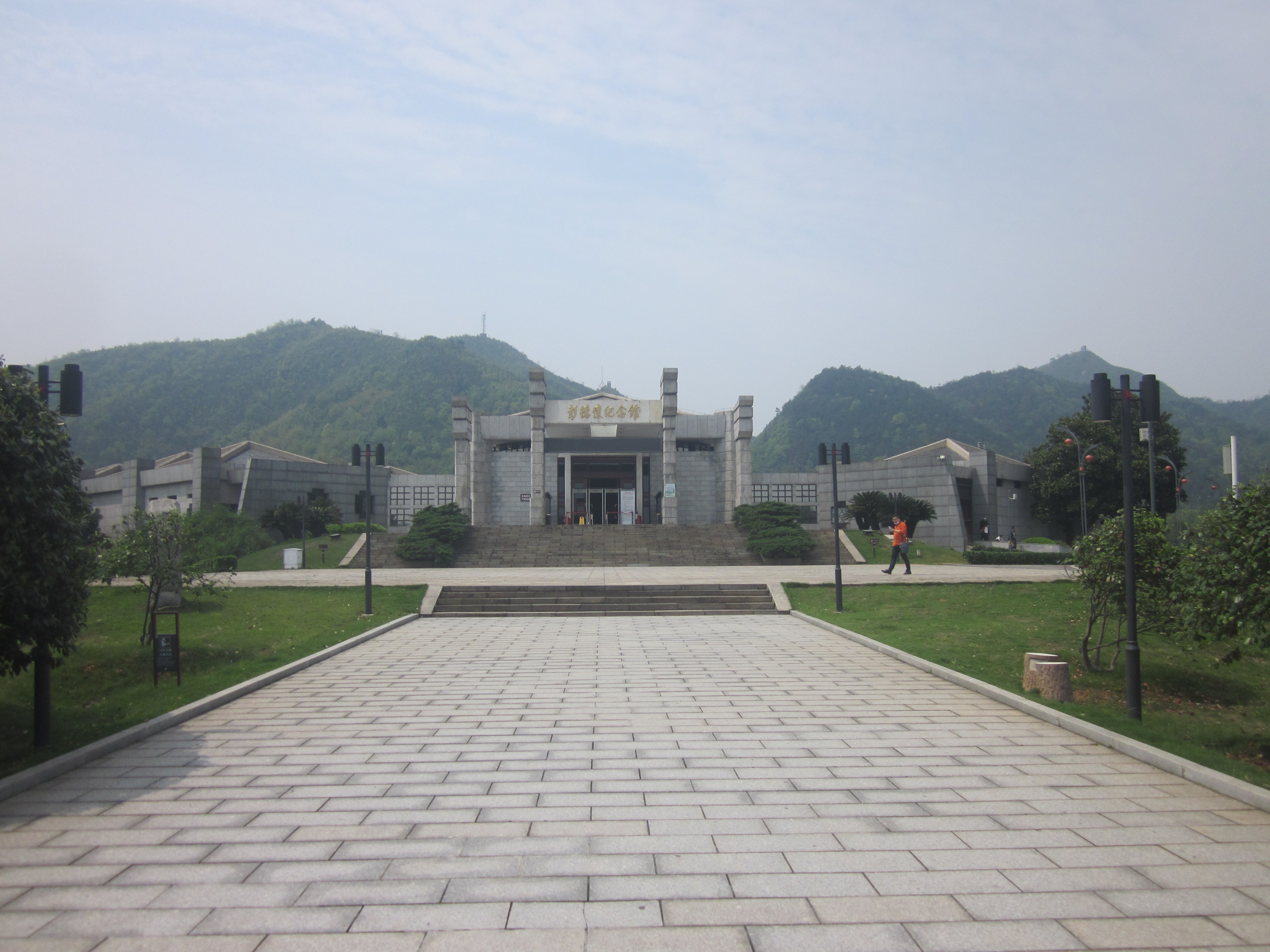
Memorial Hall of Peng Dehuai

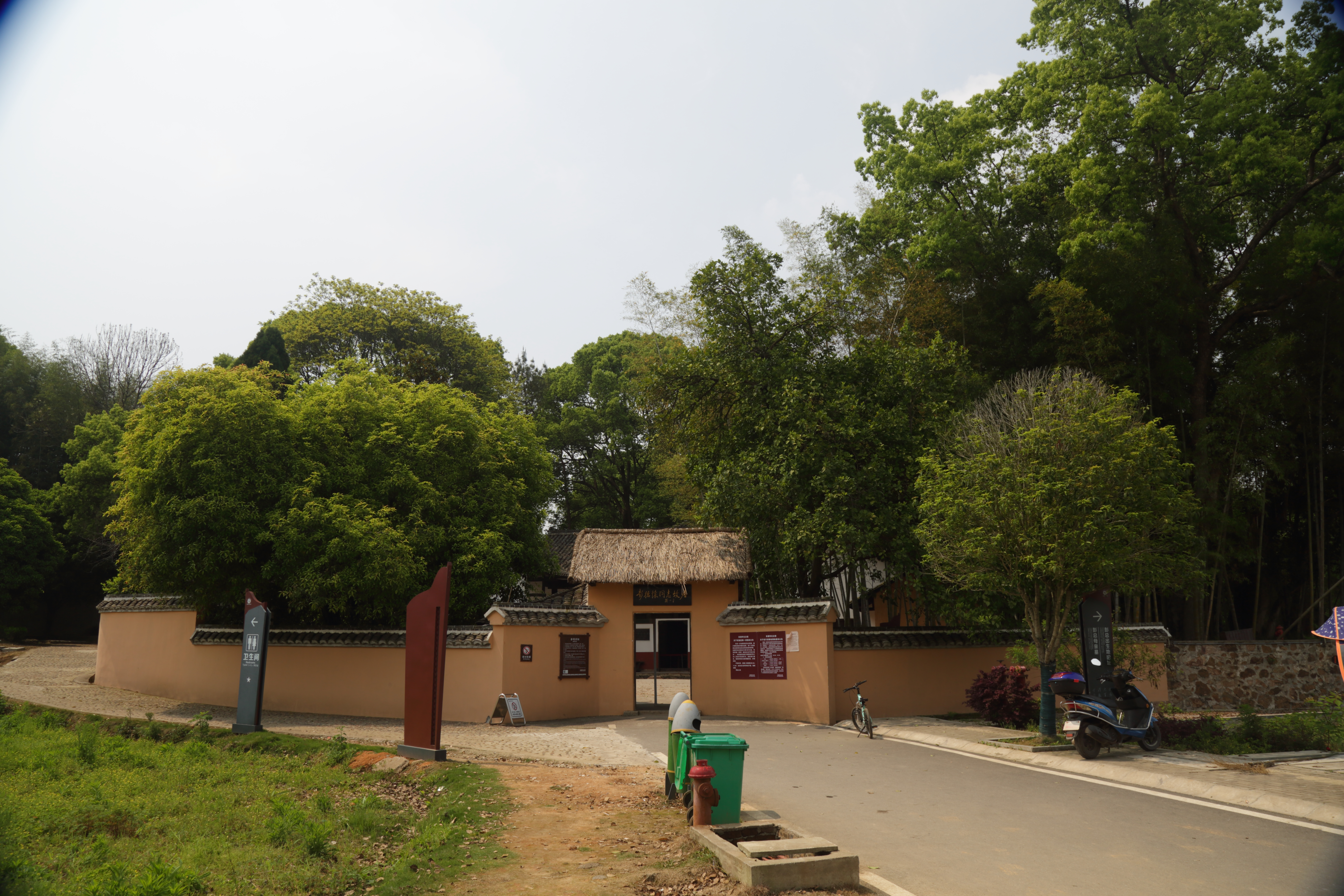
Former Residence of Peng Dehuai
