= Huashi Town =

Huashi Township may refer to:

- Huashi Town (花石镇), Xiangtan County, Xiangtan, Hunan Province
- Huashi Town (花石镇), in Yuzhou, Xuchang, Henan Province
- Huashi Town (华士镇), Jiangyin, Jiangsu Province
- Huashi Town (华石镇), Luoding, Yunfu, Guangdong Province
- Huashi Township (花石乡), Jinzhai County, Lu'an, Anhui Province

== See also ==
- Huashi (disambiguation)
