= Shigu =

Shigu is usually the atonal pinyin romanization of Chinese words and names, particularly 石鼓 (shígǔ), "stone drum(s)".

It may refer to:

== Places ==
=== China ===
- Shigu District, Hengyang, Hunan
- Shigu Railway Station, in Dongguan, Guangdong
- Shigu, Fujian, in Yongchun County, Fujian
- Shigu, Guangdong, in Gaozhou, Guangdong
- Shigu, Henan (石固镇), in Changge, Henan
- Shigu, Hubei, in Danjiangkou, Hubei
- Shigu, Hunan, in Xiangtan County, Hunan
- Shigu, Shaanxi, in Weibin District, Baoji, Shaanxi
- Shigu, Sichuan (师古镇), in Shifang, Deyang, Sichuan
- Shigu, Yunnan, in Yulong County, Yunnan
- Shigu Township, Guang'an, in Yuechi County, Guang'an, Sichuan
- Shigu Township, Yibin, in Cuiping District, Yibin, Sichuan
- Shigu Township, Ziyang, in Anyue County, Ziyang, Sichuan

=== Elsewhere ===
- Shigu, Ghana, a community in Tamale Metropolitan District, Northern Region, Ghana

== Arts ==
- Shigu, the Stone Drums of Qin, the oldest known stone inscriptions in China
- Shigu, the Chinese name of the 2015 film Lost and Love
