= Fang Zhuangyou =

Chinese historian (1902–1970)

- 方壮猷
- Born: 1902; Fenshui Township, Hunan, Qing Empire
- Died: 1970 (aged 67–68); Wuhan, Hubei, China
- Occupation: Historian
- Children: Fang Keli

Academic background
- Education: Hunan First Normal University; Beijing Normal University; Tsinghua University; University of Tokyo; University of Paris

Academic work
- Discipline: History
- Sub-discipline: Ethnic History; History of Song, Liao, Jin and Yuan
- Institutions: Wuhan University

Chinese name
- Traditional Chinese: 方莊猷
- Simplified Chinese: 方壮猷
Transcriptions
Standard Mandarin
- Hanyu Pinyin: Fāng Zhuàngyóu

Xin'an
- Chinese: 欣安
Transcriptions
Standard Mandarin
- Hanyu Pinyin: Xīn'ān

Fang Zhangxiu
- Chinese: 方彰修
Transcriptions
Standard Mandarin
- Hanyu Pinyin: Fāng Zhāngxiū

Fang Zhuangyou (Chinese: 方壮猷; 1902 – 1970), courtesy name Xin'an (欣安), was a Chinese historian who was a professor at Wuhan University, and best known for studying Chinese ethnic history and the history of Song, Liao, Jin and Yuan Empires.

== Biography ==
Fang was born Fang Zhangxiu (方彰修) in Fenshui Township, Hunan, Qing Empire, in 1902. After graduating from Hunan First Normal University, he was accepted to Beijing Normal University, and transferred to the Institute of Chinese Classics of Tsinghua University two years later. In 1929, he pursued advanced studies at the University of Tokyo, studying history under the direction of Shiratori Kurakichi. He taught at universities and colleges in both cities of Beijing and Nanjing after returning to China. He later went to the University of Paris in France to follow the sinologist Paul Pelliot study the history of oriental nationalities.

In 1936, Fang joined the faculty of Wuhan University, and taught there until 1949.

After the founding of the Communist State, in 1950, Fang became deputy director of the Cultural Relics Division of the Department of Culture of the Central-South Military and Administrative Commission, in addition to serving as president of Central South China Library since 1951. He was appointed director of the Hubei Provincial Bureau of Culture in 1955, and subsequently researcher of Hubei Institute of Philosophy and Social Sciences in 1958. He was chosen as deputy director of the Hubei Provincial Commission for the Administration of Cultural Relics in 1965.

Fang died in Wuhan, Hubei, in 1970.

== Personal life ==
Fang's son, Fang Keli (1938–2020), was a Chinese New Confucian philosopher.

== Publications ==
- 中国史学概要 [Summary of History of China] (in Chinese). Wuhan, Hubei: Wuhan University Press. 2011. ISBN 9787307085350.
- 契丹民族考 [A Study of the Qidan] (in Chinese). Beijing: Beijing Zhongxian Tuofang Technology Development Co., Ltd., Beijing Zhongxian Tuofang Technology Development Co., Ltd. 2007. OCLC 465491237.
- 鲜卑语言考 [A Study of Xianbei Language] (in Chinese). Beijing: Yenching University. 1930. OCLC 25133223.
- 南宋編年史家二李年譜 [Chronographer of the Li Family of the Southern Song Dynasty] (in Chinese). Shuo Wen She. 1944. OCLC 45770231.
- 宋史类编 [History of the Song Empire] (in Chinese).

=== Translation ===
- Shiratori Kurakichi (1934). 东胡民族考 [A Study of the Donghu] (in Japanese and Chinese). Translated by Fang, Zhuangyou. Shanghai: Commercial Press. ISBN 9787203092971. OCLC 703822040.
