= Baishi, Xiangtan =

Baishi Town 白石镇
- Town
- Location in Hunan
- Coordinates: 27°27′54″N 112°53′09″E
- Country: People's Republic of China
- Province: Hunan
- Prefecture-level city: Xiangtan
- County: Xiangtan

Area
  - Total: 98 km^{2} (38 sq mi)

Population
  - Total: 37,900
  - Density: 390/km^{2} (1,000/sq mi)
- Time zone: UTC+8 (China Standard)
- Postal code: 411200
- Area code: 0732

Baishi Town (simplified Chinese: 白石镇; traditional Chinese: 白石鎮; pinyin: Baíshí Zhèn) is an urban town in Xiangtan County, Xiangtan City, Hunan Province, People's Republic of China. As of the 2000 census it had a population of 37,900 and an area of 98 square kilometres (38 sq mi). Baishi means "white stone."

== Administrative divisions ==
The town is divided into 26 villages and 1 community, which include the following areas: Wangjianglou Community 望江楼社区, Yanhu Village 堰湖村, Yinjiachong Village 尹家冲村, Lianhua Village 莲花村, Guangqiao Village 广桥村, Shuikou Village 水口村, Tianqiao Village 田桥村, Xinhe Village 新荷村, Xinqiaopu Village 新桥铺村, Tanjialong Village 谭家垅村, Xinghua Village 杏花村, Baishi Village 白石村, Tianping Village 天平村, Xiangxing Village 象形村, Huangmao Village 黄茅村, Yandun Village 烟墩村, Hutian Village 湖田村, Shenxi Village 深溪村, Tankou Village 潭口村, Xianghe Village 湘河村, Longfeng Village 龙凤村, Honhshi Village 红石村, Yong'an Village 永安村, Zhaogong Village 昭公村, Jinhu Village 金虎村, Tuanshanpu Village 团山铺村, and You'ai Village 友爱村.

== History ==
In 2007, Baishi Town was built.

== Economy ==
Rice is important to the economy.

== Culture ==
Huaguxi is the most influential local theater.

== Notable people ==
- Ma Li'an (马立安), grandfather of Ma Ying-jeou.
- Qi Baishi, was an influential Chinese painter.
