= Shitan =

Shitan Town may refer to the following places:

== China ==
- Shitan, Fengchen (Chinese: 石滩镇), a township-level administrative unit under the jurisdiction of Fengcheng City, Yichun City, Jiangxi Province
- Shitan, Qingxin (石潭镇), an urban town in Qingxin District, Qingyuan City, Guangdong Province
- Shitan, Xiangtan (石潭镇), an urban town in Xiangtan County, Xiangtan City, Hunan Province
- Shitan, Zengcheng (石滩镇), an urban town in Zengcheng District, Guangzhou City, Guangdong Province
  - Shitan railway station, a station in Shitan, Zengcheng, Guangzhou

== Taiwan ==
- Shitan, Miaoli (獅潭鄉), a rural township in Miaoli County
