= Qingshanqiao =

Qingshanqiao may refer to:

- Qingshanqiao, Ningxiang, a town in Ningxiang County, Hunan, China
- Qingshanqiao, Xiangtan, a town in Xiangtan County, Hunan, China
