= Meilinqiao, Xiangtan =

Meilinqiao Town
- Town

Chinese transcription(s)
  - Simplified: 梅林桥镇
  - Traditional: 梅林橋鎮
  - Pinyin: Meílínqiáo Zhèn
- Location in China
- Coordinates: 27°46′42″N 112°56′21″E
- Country: People's Republic of China
- Province: Hunan
- City: Xiangtan
- County: Xiangtan County

Area
  - Total: 138.403 km^{2} (53.438 sq mi)

Population
  - Total: 49,300
  - Density: 356/km^{2} (923/sq mi)
- Time zone: UTC+8 (China Standard)
- Postal code: 411200
- Area code: 0732

Meilinqiao Town (simplified Chinese: 梅林桥镇; traditional Chinese: 梅林橋鎮; pinyin: Meílínqiáo Zhèn) is an urban town in Xiangtan County, Xiangtan City, Hunan Province, People's Republic of China. As of the 2000 census it had a population of 49385 and an area of 138.403 square kilometres (53.438 sq mi).

== History ==
In 1950, Meilin Township was built. In 1995, Meilin Town was built.

== Administrative divisions ==
The town is divided into 38 villages, which include the following areas: Hejia Village (荷佳村), Wanli Village (万利村), Lianyun Village (联云村), Anyun Village (安云村), Qianjiang Village (千江村), Zhushan Village (竹山村), Jinpenzhou Village (金盆洲村), Shibi Village (石碧村), Meishi Village (梅市村), Shimei Village (石梅村), Huangzhu Village (黄竹村), Jingguang Village (京广村), Meilin Village (梅林村), Gutangpu Village (谷塘铺村), Hongtang Village (洪塘村), Gaoqiao Village (高桥村), Gufeng Village (谷丰村), Dafen Village (大坟村), Yuexing Village (月形村), Baota Village (宝塔村), Shiyang Village (石羊村), Jiangang Village (尖岗村), Baiyun Village (白云村), Feilong Village (飞龙村), Huaxiang Village (划香村), Xinhu Village (新虎村), Xinhu Village (新湖村), Xinti Village (新堤村), Xinchang Village (新长村), Huanglongqiao Village (黄龙桥村), Renhe Village (仁和村), Helong Village (合龙村), Chengtang Village (城塘村), Wangjiachong Village (王家冲村), Yangliu Village (杨柳村), Futang Village (凫塘村), Zhegu Village (鹧鸪村), and Guojiaqiao Village (郭家桥村).

== Geography ==
Yisu River (易俗河) is known as "Juan River" (涓水), a tributary of the Xiang River, it flows through the town, Meilin River (梅林河) and Xiangdong River (向东渠) also flow through the town.

== Economy ==
The region abounds with gypsum.

Tea, pig, American bullfrog, common fig and cactus are important to the economy.

== Culture ==
Huaguxi is the most influence local theater.

== Transportation ==
The major highways are the 107 National Road (107国道) and the Xianglei Highway (湘耒高速公路).

The main railway is the Xiangqin Railway (湘黔铁路).
