= Lu Dongsheng =

Chinese general

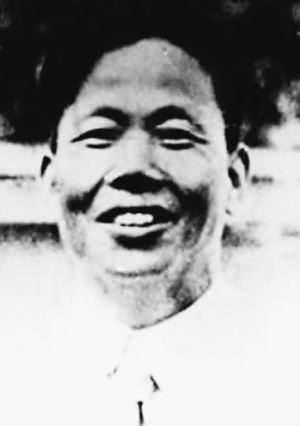
- Born: 16 April 1908 Xiangtan County, Hunan Province, China
- Died: 16 November 1945 (aged 37) Harbin, Heilongjiang Province, China

Lu Dongsheng (16 April 1908 – 16 November 1945) who was born in Xiangtan County, Hunan Province, China was the Chinese commander of the pistol company of the headquarters of the Fourth Red Army, the battalion commander of the pistol group, the battalion commander of the guarding battalion of the Second Red Army, the commander of Regiment Twenty-Seven of Division Seven of the Third Red Army, the political commissioner of the Independent Division of Hu'nan and Hubei Area, the commander of the Fourth Division of the Second Red Army, the commander of Force 358 of the Division 120 of the Eighth Route Army and the commander of Songjiang Military Command of Northeast People Autonomous Army. After the Northern Expedition, Anti-Encirclement Campaigns, the Great Expedition, and studying in the Soviet Union, Lu was killed by two Soviet soldiers in Ha'erbing city in 1945.

== Biography ==
=== Early life and during the first Chinese Civil War ===
Lu Dongsheng was born in a sharecropper family in Xiangtan County, Hu'nan Province. He was a cowboy in Chen Geng's family when he was young. In 1925, he joined the Forty-First Division of Xiang Army and in 1926, he attended the Northern Expedition, following the Eighth Army of the National Revolutionary Army and went to Wuhan City. In 1927, after Wang Jingwei launched the Seven-One-Five Event, affected by Chen Geng, Lu left Wuhan City and went to Nanchang City in the late July and became a member of the Twentieth Army of the National Revolutionary Army, under the command of He Long. In August 1927, Lu attended the Nanchang Uprising, in charge of political security with Chen Geng Lu was then appointed as the deputy commander of the First Battalion of the Sixth Company of the Twentieth Army of uprising troops. In the Huichang Battle, Chen Geng's left foot got hurt badly, and Lu protected him in the hails of bullets. After the failure in Chaoshan, Lu went to Shanghai via Hong Kong with Chen, got touch with the Central Committee of the Chinese Communist Party (CCP). In December 1927, Chen Geng introduced Lu to the CCP.

In the beginning of 1928, CCP Central Committee sent Lu to escort Zhou Yiqun, He Long, etc. to the Northwest part of Hu'nan Province. In March of the same year, Lu attended the Sangzhi uprising, after which, he was soon appointed as a traffic officer who was in charge of getting touch with CCP Central Committee. In 1929, Lu was appointed as the commander of the pistol company of the headquarters of the Fourth Red Army.

In July 1930, the Sixth Red Army joined the Fourth Red Army in Gong'an, Hubei Province. At that time, the Sixth and Fourth Red Army were under attacked by the National Revolutionary Army and the headquarters was surrounded. Lu led the pistol company to keep fighting and repel the National Revolutionary Army. In March of the following year, Lu was appointed as the battalion commander of the guarding battalion of the Second Red Army, the regimental commander of Regiment Twenty-Seven of Division Seven of the Third Red Army.

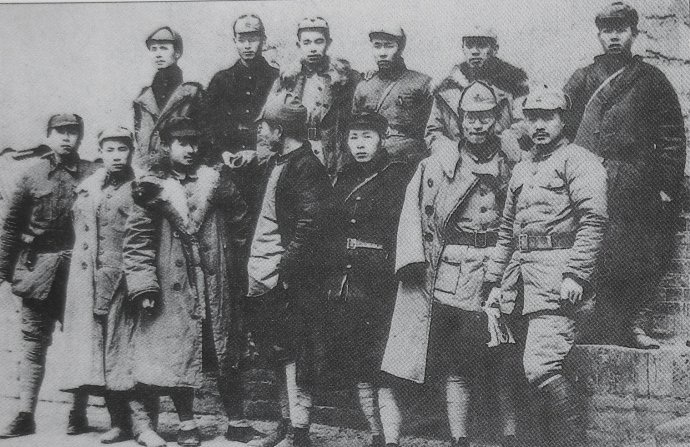
The commanders of the Second Red Army, in the front row, from the right are He Long, Zhu Rui, Li Jingquan, Wang Zhen, Guan Xiangying, He Bingyan, GanSiqi; in the back row, from the left are Zhang Ziyi, Liu Yaqiu, Liao Hansheng, Zhu Ming, Chen Bojun, Lu Dongsheng

In September 1932, the ad hoc of Western Hu'an and Western Hubei Area of the CCP Central Committee joined independent groups like Jianli, Mianyang, Qianjiang, etc. to form the independent regiment of Western Hu'nan and Western Hubei Area. They appointed Lu the political commissioner and asked him to attend the Fourth Anti-Encirclement Campaign in Western Hu'nan and Western Hubei Area.

During the breakout battle, Lu led two battalions to cover the rear but they lost the touch with main forces. Lu kept launching guerrilla warfare in areas like Jingmen and Yuan’an in Hubei Province. In early 1933, Lu led his regiment to join the main force of the Red Army, after which, he was appointed as the commander of the Training Regiment of the Third Red Army. Then, he was soon appointed as the commander of the Seventh Regiment. In October 1934, Lu was appointed as the commander of the Fourth Regiment, helping to establish the Soviet areas in Eastern Guizhou and in areas around Hunan, Hubei, Xichuang and Guizhou provinces. In 1934, Lu hurt his leg during the last battle in Houping Town, Dayong County, Hunan province. In November 1935, Lu led his regiment to attend the Long March. In April 1936, Lu conducted his regiment to force a crossing the Jinsha River – located in Shigu Town, Yulong County, Yunnan Province – ensuring the success of crossing the river for the Second and the Sixth Army Troops. In September, after the Second Force of the Red Army crossed the Wei River, Lu led four divisions fighting for two days, covering main forces to pass the Liupan Mountain. On 22 September, after they arrived in Jiangtaibao in Jingning County, Gansu Province, they successfully joined the First and the Fourth Red Army.

=== Study in the Soviet Union ===
In the beginning of the Second Sino-Japanese War, Lu was appointed as the commander of the Bridge 358 of the Regiment 120 (failed to assume office), soon after which, he was assigned to study at the Military and Political University of Resistance Against Japan in Yan’an city. In winter of the same year, Lu was arranged to recuperate in Soviet Union by CCP Central Committee due to his healthy condition. In March 939, Lu was sent to study at the M. V. Frunze Military Academy. In September 1941, Nazi Germany marched its army towards Moscow, Lin Biao led those studying in Moscow, including Lu, to return to China via Mongolia by train. In October, they arrived in Kulun, an Outer Mongolia city and stuck there for one month since the borderline roads between Mongolia and China had been destroyed. Lin Biao was the only one who could take a plane back to China since he was the only one who registered as a formal identity—the head commander of the Fifth Regiment—when leaving for the Soviet Union. The rest had to stay in Outer Mongolia and could not take a plane. Liu Yalou and Lu were good in Russian, so they were assigned to be advisers of Soviet Army in Mongolia. In 1943, Liu Yalou, Yang Zhicheng and Lu went to Khabarovsk, an Army Region of Far East Soviet Union, and worked in 88th Brigade of infantry.

=== Return to China and death ===
Lu followed the Red Force of the Soviet Union and returned to China. On 16 November, (Note: There are different accounts of the date of Lu's death: 15 November, 17 November, 14 December, etc.) Chen Yun, the secretary of the branch office of CCP Central Committee in North Manchu, arrived in Ha’erbing city and held a meeting in Dazhi Street that night. In the meeting, Lu was appointed as the commander of the Military Region of Songjiang. The meeting finished at 11pm, after which, Lu helped Chen Yun to pick up Chen's luggage. On their way back, Lu was shot dead by two Soviet soldiers who violated the military discipline and robbed on the road.
