= Fenshui Township, Hunan =

Fenshui Township 分水乡
- Township
- Location in Hunan
- Coordinates: 27°33′08″N 112°35′22″E
- Country: People's Republic of China
- Province: Hunan
- Prefecture-level city: Xiangtan
- County: Xiangtan County

Area
  - Total: 85.33 km^{2} (32.95 sq mi)

Population
  - Total: 39,800
  - Density: 466/km^{2} (1,210/sq mi)
- Time zone: UTC+8 (China Standard)
- Postal code: 411200
- Area code: 0732

Fenshui Township (simplified Chinese: 分水乡; traditional Chinese: 分水鄉; pinyin: Fēnshuǐ Xiāng) is a rural township in Xiangtan County, Xiangtan City, Hunan Province, People's Republic of China. It's surrounded by Shigu Town on the west, Xiangxiang City on the north, Paitou Township on the east, and Shigu Town on the south. As of the 2000 census it had a population of 39,898 and an area of 85.33 square kilometres (32.95 sq mi).

== Administrative divisions ==
The township is divided into 32 villages, which include the following areas: Huxingshan Village (虎形山村), Haotou Village (豪头村), Changfeng Village (长丰村), Shuangfengchong Village (双凤冲村), Shazhou Village (沙洲村), Fenshui'ao Village (分水坳村), Baishimiao Village (白石庙村), Shiqiao Village (石桥村), Beilin Village (北林村), Yang'en Village (杨恩村), Xinba Village (新坝村), Shitong Village (石桐村), Zhenge Village (珍鸽村), Huaishuwan Village (槐树湾村), Xiaochong Village (晓冲村), Lihong Village (栗红村), Penghe Village (彭何村), Huanshan Village (环山村), Baishajing Village (白沙井村), Guanglin Village (广林村), Waye Village (瓦叶村), Qujiang Village (曲江村), Tonghe Village (同合村), Wantou Village (湾头村), Tianlong Village (天垅村), Jiaochang Village (较场村), Shijiang Village (石江村), Hejia Village (合家村), Shilong Village (石龙村), Guangyang Village (广阳村), Qishan Village (旗山村), and Dalong Village (大垅村).

== History ==
In 1950, Fenshui Township was built.

== Geography ==
Qujiang River (曲江河) flows through the town.

Dongfeng Reservoir (东风水库) is located in the town.

== Economy ==
Fish, rice and pig are important to the economy.

== Culture ==
Shadow play and Huaguxi are the most influential forms of local theater.

== Attractions ==
Sanjie Temple (三界寺), was built in Qing dynasty, is a famous tourist attraction.

Songzhen Bridge (宋贞桥), was built in Song dynasty, is a popular tourist attraction.

== Celebrity ==
- Fang Xuzhi, politician.
- Peng Yueting, revolutionist.
- Chen Pengnian, politician.
