= Shao Jiang =

Shao Jiang may refer to:

- Jiang (rank)
- Shao Jiang SA, an association football club in Macau
- Shao-Jiang Min, a collection of dialects of Min Chinese
- Shaojiang, a village in Longkou, Xiangtan, Hunan
