= Huashi =

Huashi may refer to:

- Huashi (花市), a residential neighborhood in Dongcheng, Beijing, China
- Huashi Town (花石镇), in Xiangtan County, Xiangtan City, Hu'nan
- Huashi station (华师站), a Guangzhou Metro station in Guangzhou, Guangdong, China
- Talc (滑石), a hydrated magnesium phyllosilicate mineral

== See also ==
- Huashida (disambiguation)
