= Former Residence of Peng Dehuai =

- 彭德怀故居
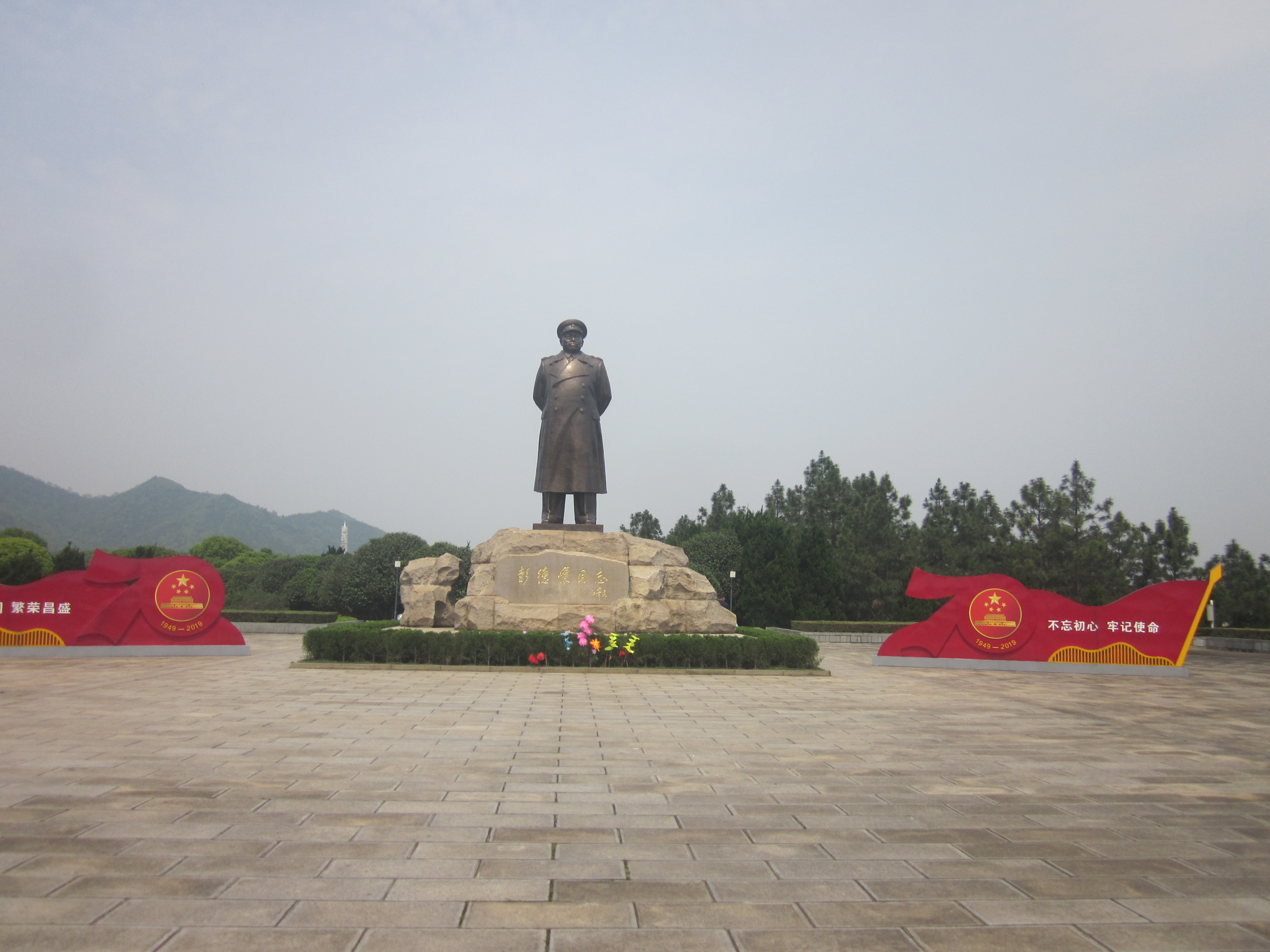
- Bronze statue of Peng Dehuai

- Location within Hunan Location within China
- Former names: Sanhua Hall

General information
- Type: Traditional folk houses
- Location: Wushi Town, Xiangtan, Hunan, China
- Coordinates: 27°51′N 112°54′E
- Opened: 1983
- Owner: Government of Xiangtan

Height
- Architectural: Chinese architecture

Technical details
- Floor area: 350 m^{2} (3,800 sq ft)
- Grounds: 2,490 m^{2} (26,800 sq ft)

The Former Residence of Peng Dehuaior Peng Dehuai's Former Residence (simplified Chinese: 彭德怀故居; traditional Chinese: 彭德懷故居; pinyin: Péng Déhuaí Gùjū) was built in 1925. It is located in Wushi Village of Wushi Town, Xiangtan County, Hunan, China. It has an area of about 2,490 m^{2} (26,800 sq ft) and a building area of about 350 m^{2} (3,800 sq ft). It encompasses buildings such as the old houses, the Peng Dehuai Memorial Hall, the Statue of Deng Dehlia, the Ancestral Temple (易华祠), and the Graves of Martyrs.

== History ==
In 1925, Peng Dehuai built a house and named it "Sanhua Hall" (三华堂).

In 1958 and 1961, Peng Dehuai returned to live there.

In 1982, Deng Xiaoping wrote "Peng Dehuai's Former Residence" on the horizontal tablet.

== Gallery ==
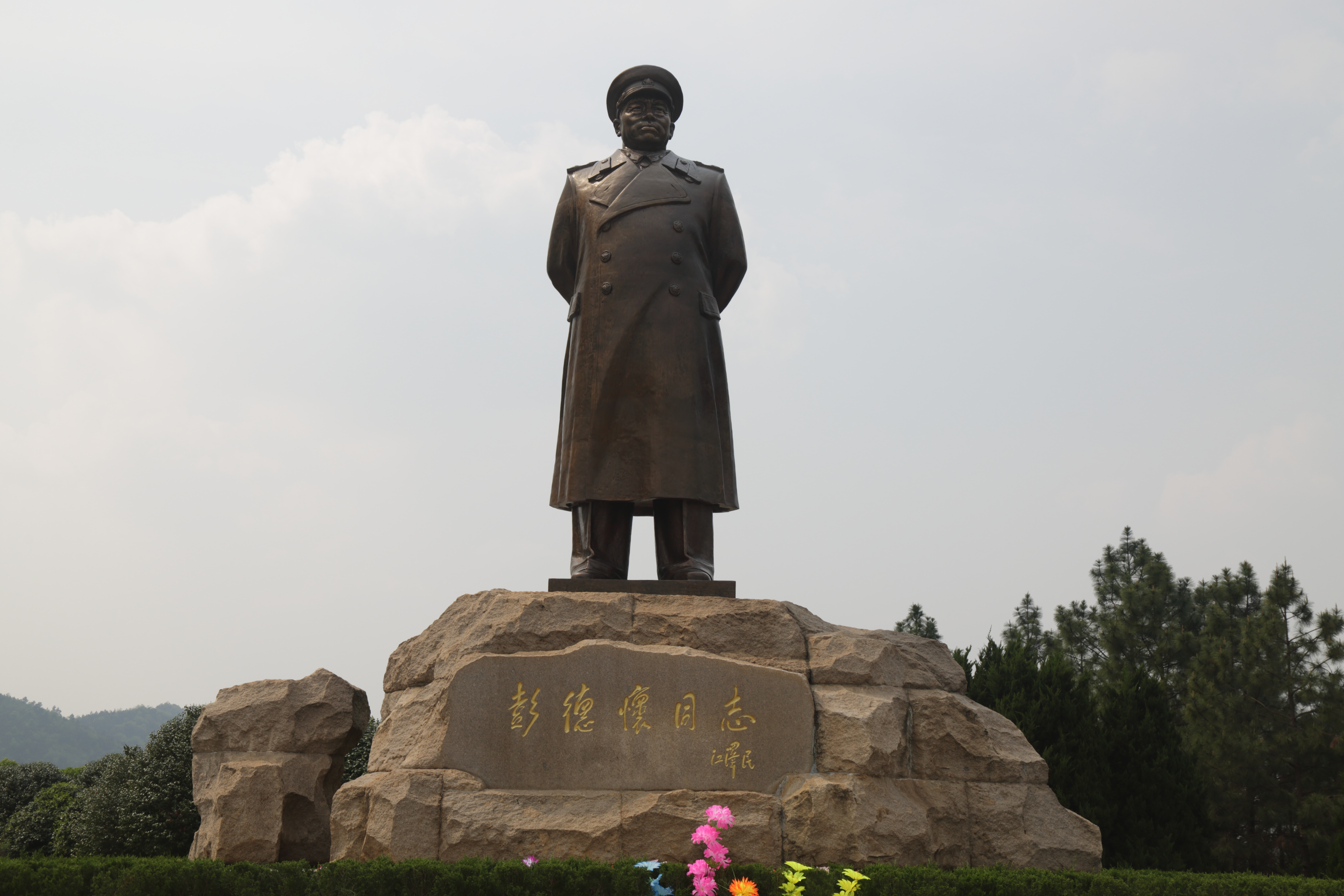
Bronze statue of Peng Dehuai

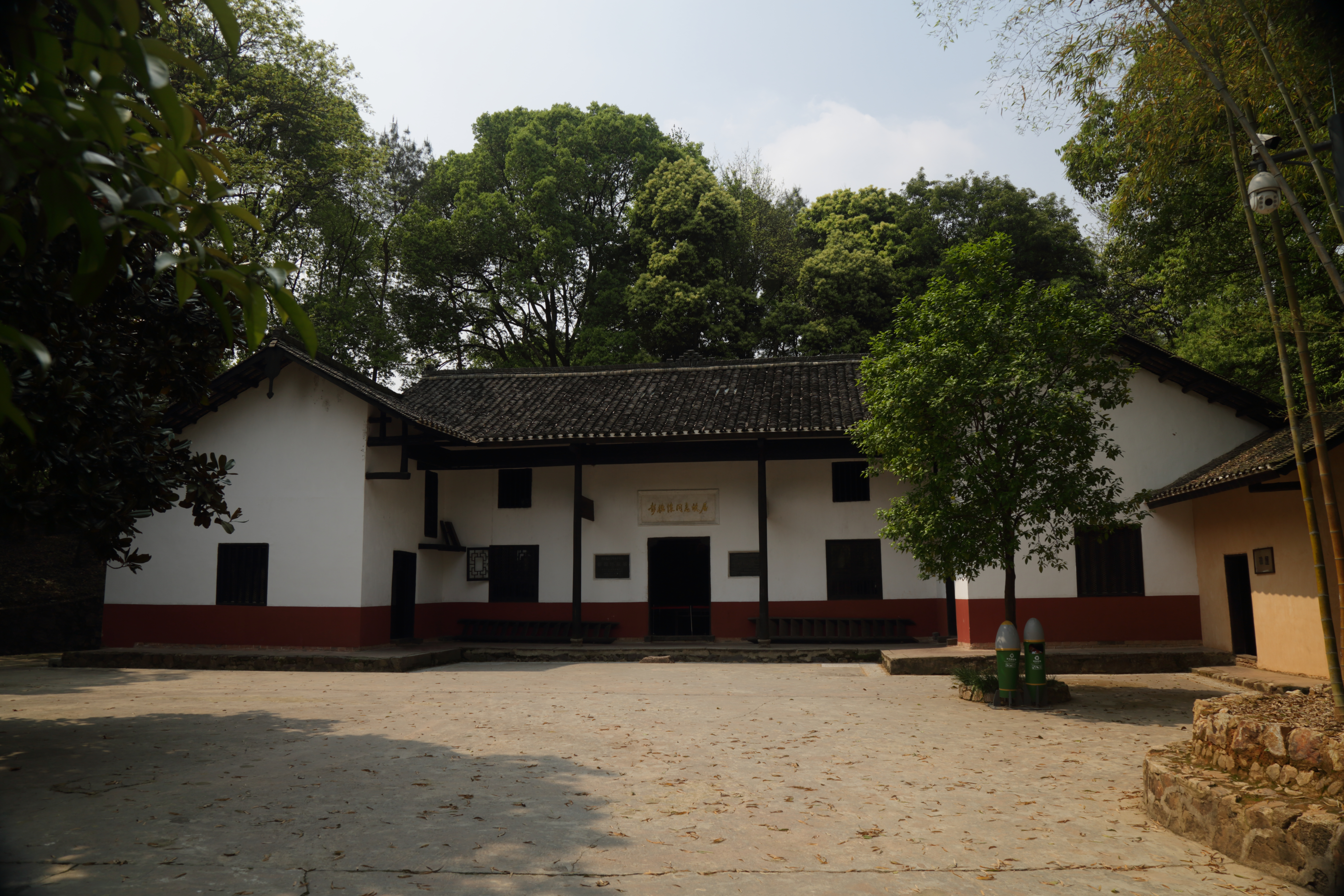
Peng Dehuai's house

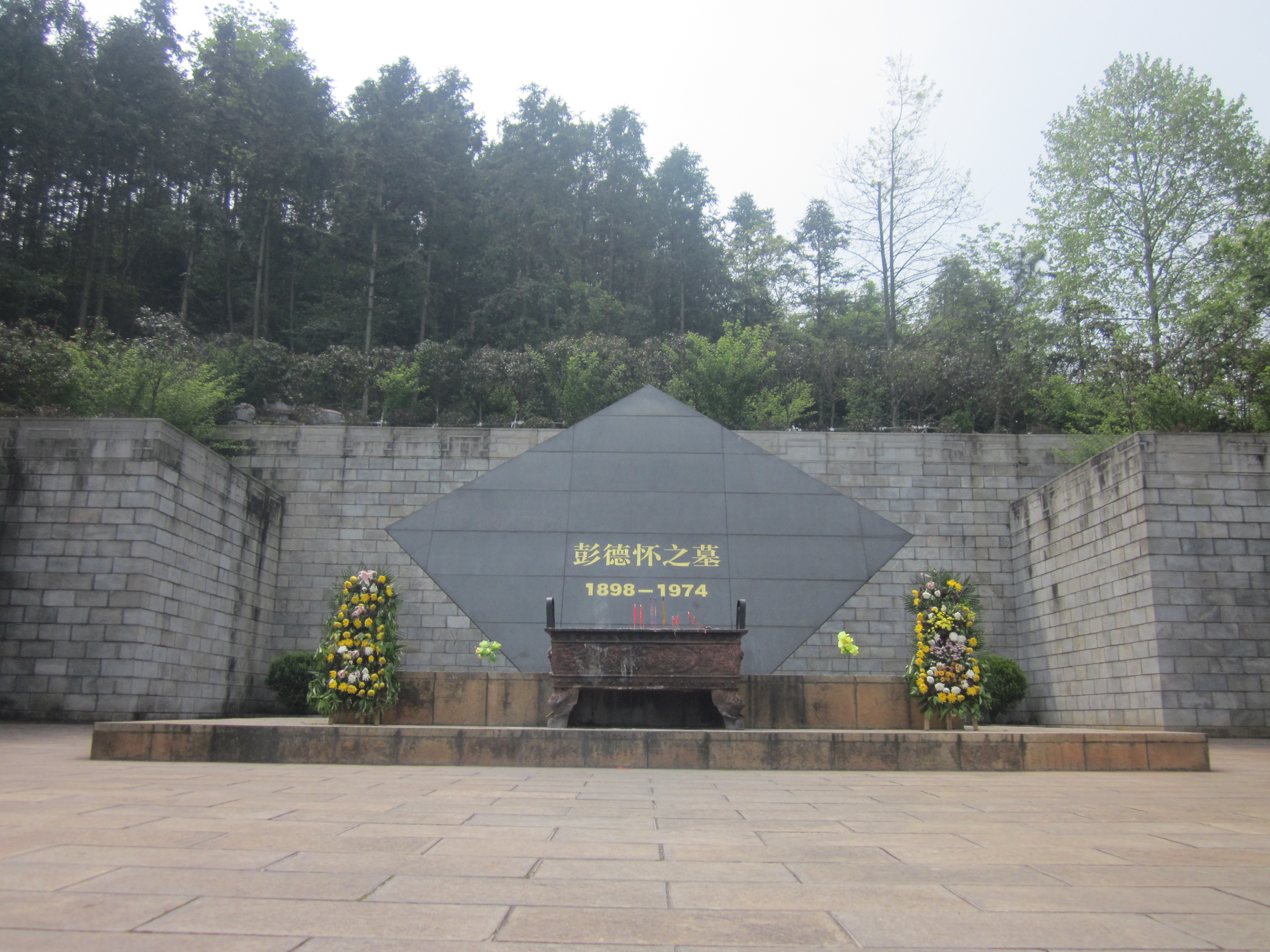
Tomb of Peng Dehuai

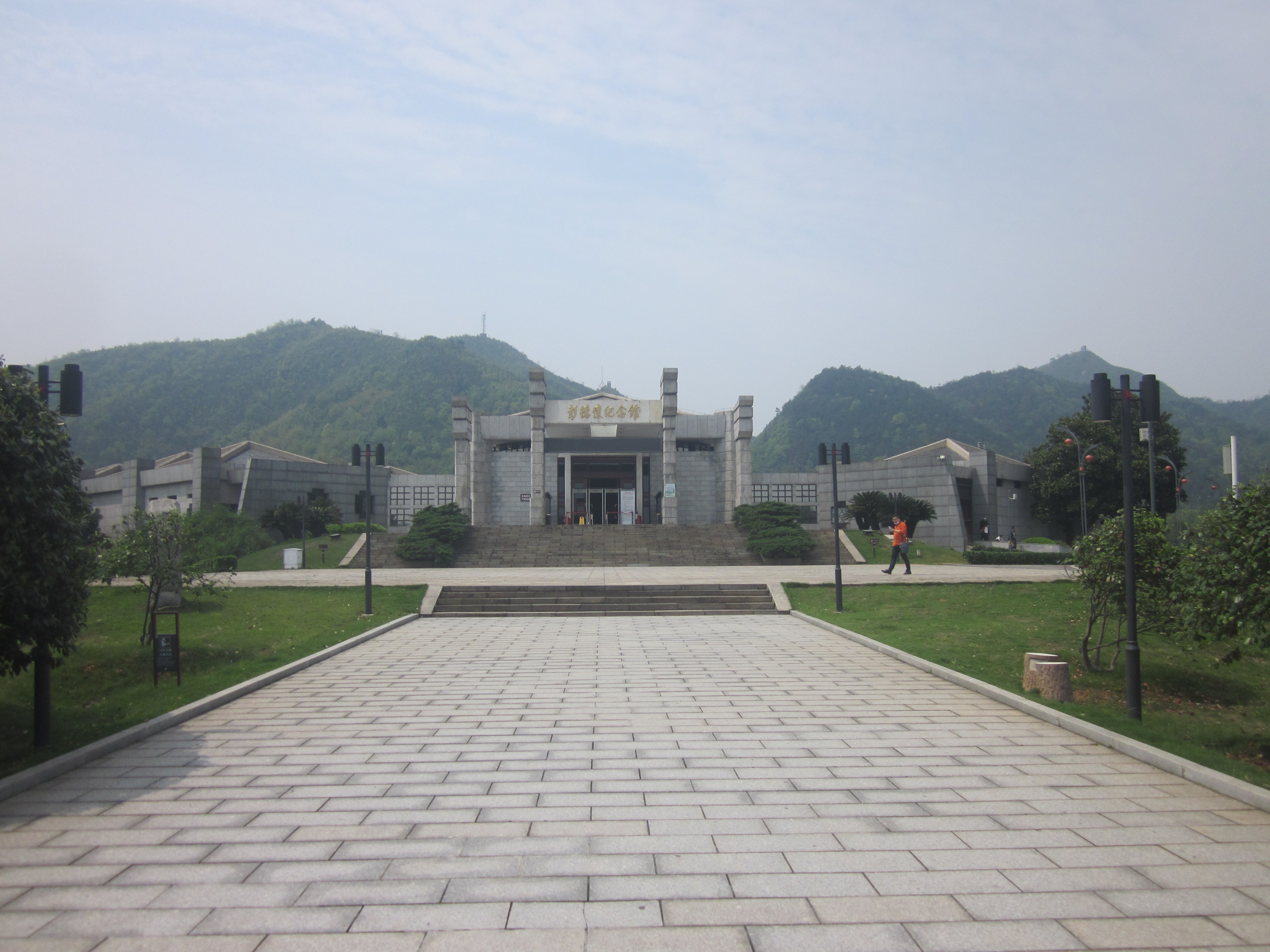
Memorial Hall of Peng Dehuai

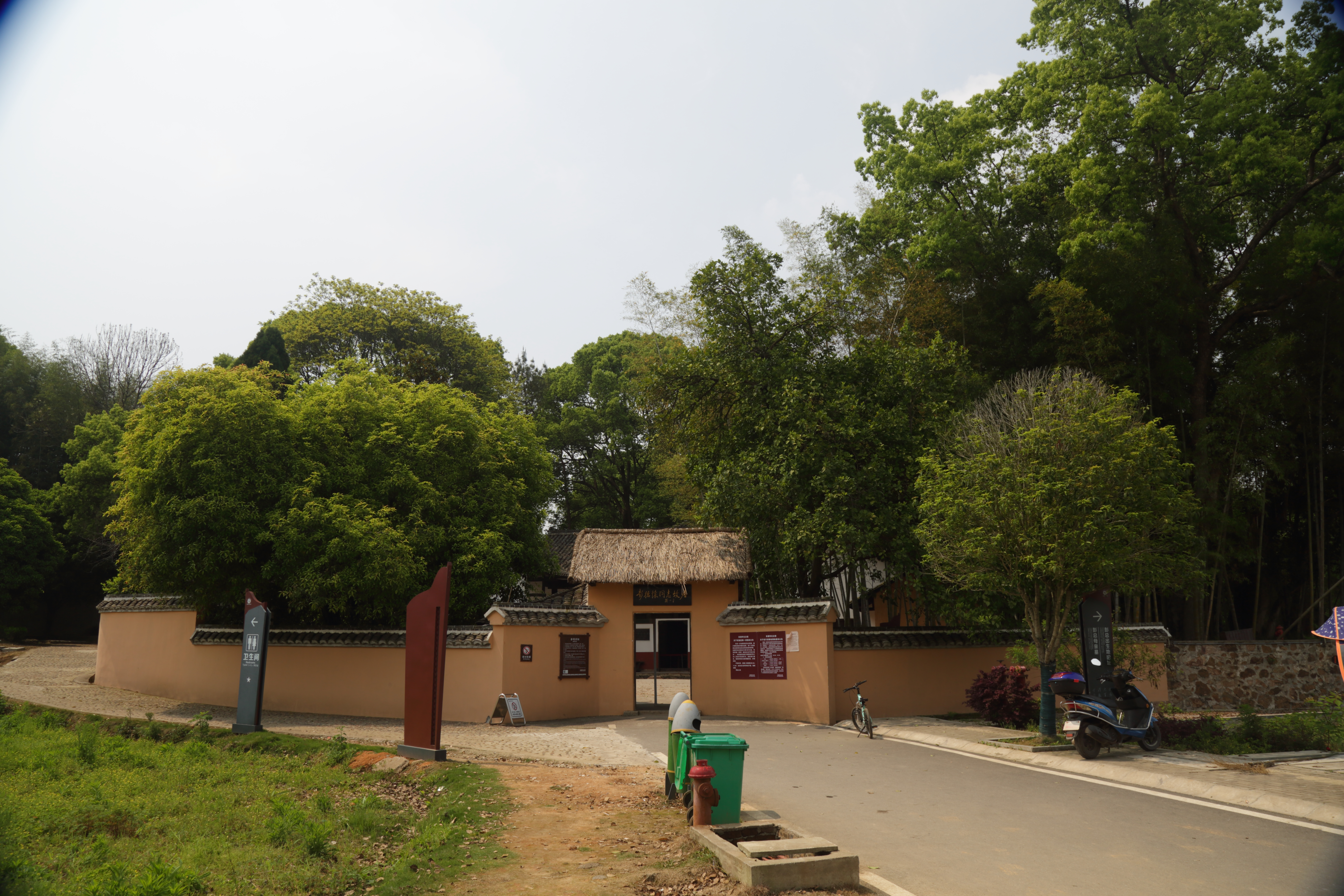
Former Residence of Peng Dehuai
