= Qianjia =

Qianjia may refer to:

- Qianjia railway station, a railway station on the Taiwan Railways Administration Neiwan Line
- Qianjia Town (千家镇), Ledong Li Autonomous County, Hainan Province, China
- Qianjia Village (千甲里), East District, Hsinchu, Taiwan
- Qianjia Village (千家村), Cha'ensi, Xiangtan, Hunan Province, China
- Qianjia Village (钱家村), Weiyuan, Jinggu County, Yunnan Province, China
