= Tanjiashan, Xiangtan =

Tanjiashan Town 谭家山镇
- Town
- Location in Hunan
- Coordinates: 27°38′38″N 112°57′33″E
- Country: People's Republic of China
- Province: Hunan
- Prefecture-level city: Xiangtan
- County: Xiangtan

Area
  - Total: 100.45 km^{2} (38.78 sq mi)

Population
  - Total: 50,500
  - Density: 503/km^{2} (1,300/sq mi)
- Time zone: UTC+8 (China Standard)
- Postal code: 411200
- Area code: 0732

Tanjiashan Town (simplified Chinese: 谭家山镇; traditional Chinese: 譚家山鎮; pinyin: Tánjiāshān Zhèn) is an urban town in Xiangtan County, Hunan Province, People's Republic of China. It's surrounded by Shebu Town on the west, Guyuefeng Town and Leidashi Town on the east, and Zhonglupu Town on the south. As of the 2000 census it had a population of 51,540 and an area of 100.45 square kilometres (38.78 sq mi).

== Administrative divisions ==
The town is divided into 28 villages and five communities.

- Zuotang Community (佐塘社区)
- Zuzhu Community (紫竹社区)
- Qingshanling Community (青山岭社区)
- Shanpo Community (杉坡社区)
- Tudimiao Community (土地庙社区)
- Gaoshan Village (高山村)
- Chayuan Village (茶元村)
- Quanfeng Village (泉丰村)
- Jinquan Village (金泉村)
- Xiaochong Village (肖冲村)
- Xianglong Village (响垅村)
- Maoting Village (毛亭村)
- Bangtang Village (榜塘村)
- Changtang Village (长塘村)
- Pingtang Village (坪塘村)
- Tielu Village (铁炉村)
- Zhuxia Village (竹霞村)
- Changling Village (长岭村)
- Tangxia Village (棠霞村)
- Nanquan Village (南泉村)
- Gaotang Village (高塘村)
- Shihong Village (石洪村)
- Yuetang Village (月塘村)
- Xian'e Village (仙娥村)
- Huamen Village (花门村)
- Xinlong Village (新龙村)
- Gangtie Village (钢铁村)
- Tongpai Village (同排村)
- Chaolian Village (朝联村)
- Xinquan Village (新泉村)
- Chenjialong Village (陈家垅村)
- Heyeba Village (荷叶坝村)

== Economy ==
The region abounds with coal and limestone.

Rice and pig are important to the economy.

== Culture ==
Huaguxi is the most influential local theater.

== Transportation ==
The major highways are the 107 National Road (107国道) and the 313 Provincial Road (313省道).
