= Yunhuqiao, Xiangtan =

Yunhuqiao Town 云湖桥镇
- Town
- Location in Hunan
- Coordinates: 27°49′28″N 112°42′42″E
- Country: People's Republic of China
- Province: Hunan
- Prefecture-level city: Xiangtan
- County: Xiangtan

Area
  - Total: 130 km^{2} (50 sq mi)

Population
  - Total: 62,300
  - Density: 480/km^{2} (1,200/sq mi)
- Time zone: UTC+8 (China Standard)
- Postal code: 411200
- Area code: 0732

Yunhuqiao Town (simplified Chinese: 云湖桥镇; traditional Chinese: 云湖橋鎮; pinyin: Yúnhúqiáo Zhèn) is an urban town in Xiangtan County, Hunan Province, People's Republic of China. It's surrounded by Xiangxiang City and Shaoshan City on the west, Daolin Town and Datunying Town on the north, Jiangshe Town and Xiangtang Township on the east, and Yangjiaqiao Town on the south. As of the 2000 census it had a population of 62,328 and an area of 130 square kilometres (50 sq mi).

== Administrative divisions ==
The town is divided into 46 villages and two communities, which include the following areas: Yunhu Community (云湖社区), Qili Community (七里社区), Qili Village (七里村), Shimazui Village (石马嘴村), Chujia Village (楚家村), Yunhu Village (云湖村), Shijingpu Village (石井铺村), Yunfeng'an Village (云峰庵村), Xinnan Village (新南村), Jizhong Village (集中村), Wangjiawan Village (王家湾村), Houjia Village (候家村), Shuihu Village (税湖村), Malanqiao Village (马栏桥村), Tielutang Village (铁炉塘村), Feilun Village (飞轮村), Hefu Village (荷芙村), Wangmei Village (望梅村), Bei'an Village (北岸村), Anren Village (安仁村), Tian'e Village (天鹅村), Liema Village (烈马村), Longshan Village (龙山村), Xianjiang Village (), Yanglin Village (杨林村), Shiniu Village (石牛村), Shijia Village (石家村), Hanposhan Village (寒婆山村), Dongtang Village (东塘村), Yanshan Village (烟山村), Da'an Village (大安村), Tianxing Village (天星村), Xiongjia Village (熊家村), Guhu Village (古湖村), Huangjin Village (黄金村), Shixiong Village (狮雄村), Tuoshan Village (托山村), Lianghu Village (良湖村), Jianxin Village (建新村), Jiandong Village (建东村), Lishan Village (立山村), Tangwan Village (塘湾村), Qingfeng Village (清风村), Yishan Village (移山村), Gaohu Village (高湖村), Shijia'ao Village (史家坳村), Lixin Village (立新村), and Nanzhu Village (楠竹村).

== History ==
Yunhuqiao Township was built in 1985. In 1995, Yunhuqiao Town was built.

== Economy ==
The region abounds with coal and limestone.

Rice, sweet potato and pig are important to the economy.

== Attractions ==
Yunhu Bridge (云湖桥) was built in 1472 and later destroyed and rebuilt several times.

== Celebrity ==
- Tang Hongbo, People's Liberation Army soldier and astronaut.

== Culture ==
Huaguxi is the most influential local theater.
