= Zhonglupu =

Zhonglupu Town 中路铺镇
- Town
- Location in Hunan
- Coordinates: 27°33′11″N 112°55′42″E
- Country: People's Republic of China
- Province: Hunan
- Prefecture-level city: Xiangtan
- County: Xiangtan

Area
  - Total: 183.6 km^{2} (70.9 sq mi)

Population
  - Total: 62,000
  - Density: 340/km^{2} (870/sq mi)
- Time zone: UTC+8 (China Standard)
- Postal code: 411200
- Area code: 0732

Zhonglupu Town (simplified Chinese: 中路铺镇; traditional Chinese: 中路鋪鎮; pinyin: Zhōnglùpù Zhèn) is an urban town in Xiangtan County, Hunan Province, People's Republic of China. It's surrounded by Huashi Town and Shebu Town on the west, Tanjiashan Town on the north, Zhuzhou County on the east, and Cha'ensi Town on the south. As of the 2000 census it had a population of 62,000 and an area of 183.6 square kilometres (70.9 sq mi).

== Administrative divisions ==
The town is divided into 39 villages and one community.

== Geography ==
The region abounds with silicon and limestone.

Zhonglupu Reservoir (中路铺水库) and Yinzishan Reservoir (印子山水库) are located in the town.

== Economy ==
Rice, pig, sugar, lotus seed, tea and black goat are important to the economy.

== Education ==
- High school: Xiangtan County Fifth High School.

== Attractions ==
Xiaoxia Mountain (晓霞山) and Wulong Mountain (五龙山) are famous tourist attractions.

== Culture ==
Huaguxi is the most influential local theater.

== Celebrity ==
- Li Jinjiong, Revolutionist.
