= Hekou, Xiangtan =

Hekou Town 河口镇
- Town
- Location in Hunan
- Coordinates: 27°47′25″N 112°52′34″E
- Country: People's Republic of China
- Province: Hunan
- Prefecture-level city: Xiangtan
- County: Xiangtan County

Area
  - Total: 93.78 km^{2} (36.21 sq mi)

Population
  - Total: 45,000
  - Density: 480/km^{2} (1,200/sq mi)
- Time zone: UTC+8 (China Standard)
- Postal code: 411200
- Area code: 0732

Hekou Town (simplified Chinese: 河口镇; traditional Chinese: 河口鎮; pinyin: Hékoǔ Zhèn) is an urban town in Xiangtan County, Hunan Province, People's Republic of China. As of the 2000 census it had a population of 45,000 and an area of 93.78 square kilometres (36.21 sq mi).

== Administrative divisions ==
The town is divided into 35 villages and 1 community, which include the following areas: Xinjie Community (新街社区), Hekou Village (河口村), Yuexing Village (月形村), Qili Village (齐力村), Xianjin Village (先进村), Fengshuchong Village (枫树冲村), Shuangbanqiao Village (双板桥村), Baimi Village (白米村), Zhongwan Village (中湾村), Taihe Village (太和村), Sanlian Village (三联村), Shanhu Village (山湖村), Tianbai Village (天白村), Gaosi Village (高司村), Shaquan Village (沙泉村), Yangji Village (杨基村), Zitang Village (紫塘村), Liantuo Village (莲托村), Shuangjiangkou Village (双江口村), Luhua Village (芦花村), Youyu Village (友余村), Taolun Village (陶伦村), Hongqi Village (红旗村), Shangxingqiao Village (上星桥村), Tongjiaba Village (桐家坝村), Daba Village (大坝村), Linquan Village (林泉村), Yijia Village (易佳村), Jingzhushan Village (京竹山村), Xilin Village (西林村), Xinxin Village (新新村), Qingshichong Village (青石冲村), Dongquan Village (董泉村), Gutangqiao Village (古塘桥村), Fengshu Village (枫树村), and Shiwan Village (石湾村).

== History ==
In 1984, Hekou Township was built. In 1993, Heku Town was built.

== Geography ==
Xiang River, Yisu River (易俗河) and Lian River (涟水) flow through the town.

== Economy ==
Rice, water melon and rapeseed are important to the economy.

== Culture ==
Huaguxi is the most influential local theater.

== Transportation ==
The major highway is the 320 National Road (320国道).
