= Pengnian =

Pengnian (彭年 or 鵬年; Péngnián) is a Chinese male given name. Notable people with this name include:

- Chen Pengnian (陳鵬年; 1664–1723), Chinese politician and scholar
- Ren Pengnian (任彭年; 1894–1968), Chinese film director
- Yu Pengnian (余彭年; 1922–2015), Chinese businessman
