= Shebu, Xiangtan =

Shebu Town 射埠镇
- Town
- Location in Hunan
- Coordinates: 27°37′42″N 112°47′24″E
- Country: People's Republic of China
- Province: Hunan
- Prefecture-level city: Xiangtan
- County: Xiangtan

Area
  - Total: 32 km^{2} (12 sq mi)

Population
  - Total: 17,000
  - Density: 530/km^{2} (1,400/sq mi)
- Time zone: UTC+8 (China Standard)
- Postal code: 411200
- Area code: 0732

Shebu Town (simplified Chinese: 射埠镇; traditional Chinese: 射埠鎮; pinyin: Shèbù Zhèn) is an urban town in Xiangtan County, Hunan Province, People's Republic of China. As of the 2000 census it had a population of 63,169 and an area of 170.96 square kilometres (66.01 sq mi).

== Administrative divisions ==
The town is divided into 50 villages and 2 communities, which include the following areas:

- Tanhua Community (潭花社区)
- Shaojing Community (韶井社区)
- Shebu Village (射埠村)
- Wantang Village (湾塘村)
- Xintang Village (新塘村)
- Batang Village (坝塘村)
- Zhanggong Village (张公村)
- Dayantang Village (大烟塘村)
- Shangchun Village (上春村)
- Zhongxing Village (众星村)
- Yuhua Village (雨华村)
- Jinling Village (金岭村)
- Hexia Village (合霞村)
- Gaofeng Village (高丰村)
- Yuanhu Village (园湖村)
- Xiaoli Village (莜里村)
- Hehua Village (荷花村)
- Baishui Village (白水村)
- Wangchong Village (旺冲村)
- Yujia Village (余加村)
- Tiejiang Village (铁江村)
- Bishui Village (碧水村)
- Xinliao Village (新燎村)
- Shanshan Village (杉山村)
- Quntai Village (群台村)
- Xianfeng Village (仙凤村)
- Qiaoliang Village (桥梁村)
- Quanjiang Village (泉江村)
- Quanxing Village (船形村)
- Baoqian Village (板桥村)
- Shanxian Village (杉仙村)
- Tuanshan Village (团山村)
- Gutang Village (谷塘村)
- Quanjing Village (泉井村)
- Yuetangchong Village (月塘冲村)
- Heli Village (合力村)
- Honghu Village (洪湖村)
- Luming Village (鹿鸣村)
- Xinqiao Village (新桥村)
- Chaitang Village (柴塘村)
- Xiashan Village (峡山村)
- Laiyi Village (来仪村)
- Guihua Village (桂花村)
- Gaoquan Village (高泉村)
- Fangshangqiao Village (方上桥村)
- Dalitang Village (大栗塘村)
- Xiatang Village (霞塘村)
- Fanglun Village (方伦村)
- Changyan Village (长延村)
- Chizi Village (池子村)
- Juyu Village (巨鱼村)
- Jianlong Village (见龙村)

== History ==
In 1988, Shebu Township was built. In May 1995, Shebu Town was built.

== Economy ==
The region abounds with iron, limestone and gold. Tea is important to the economy.

== Education ==
There are 22 primary schools, five Middle schools and one high school located within the town,

== Culture ==
Huaguxi is the most influential local theater.

== Celebrity ==
- James Soong (Song Chuyu), Taiwanese politician.
