= Yangjiaqiao, Xiangtan =

Yangjiaqiao Town 杨嘉桥镇
- Town
- Location in Hunan
- Coordinates: 27°46′28″N 112°46′53″E
- Country: People's Republic of China
- Province: Hunan
- Prefecture-level city: Xiangtan
- County: Xiangtan

Population
  - Total: 60,900
- Time zone: UTC+8 (China Standard)
- Postal code: 411214
- Area code: 0732

Yangjiaqiao Town (simplified Chinese: 杨嘉桥镇; traditional Chinese: 楊嘉橋鎮; pinyin: Yángjiāqiáo Zhèn) is an urban town in Xiangtan County, Hunan Province, People's Republic of China.

== Demographics ==
As of the 2006 census, it had a population of 60,929.

== Governance ==
The town is divided into 41 villages and three communities, which include the following areas: Jiguan Community (机关社区), Dianzijie Community (电厂街社区), Wangjiashan Community (王家山社区), Wushiba Village (乌石坝村), Donghe Village (洞和村), Jinqiao Village (金桥村), Biyuan Village (碧源村), Sanhe Village (三合村), Xinxiang Village (新湘村), Longhua Village (龙华村), Donggao Village (东皋村), Jiaotuo Village (蛟托村), Jinxing Village (金星村), Bailuchong Village (白鹿冲村), Shiqi Village (石歧村), Puziling Village (铺子岭村), Meilin Village (梅林村), Jiujiang Village (九江村), Zhanggongtang Village (张弓塘村), Huawei Village (花围村), Jinlong Village (金龙村), Xinhe Village (新河村), Fengshuqiao Village (枫树桥村), Dengjiaba Village (邓家坝村), Jinqi Village (金棋村), Jinfeng Village (金风村), Yaozi Village (鹞子村), Hongping Village (洪坪村), Hongtuo Village (洪托村), Kuangjia Village (旷家村), Batuo Village (八托村), Xinfu Village (新福村), Zhengfu Village (正福村), Dukou Village (渡口村), Fuxing Village (福星村), Diefu Village (叠福村), Jinma Village (金马村), Jingzhou Village (荆洲村), Yanshan Village (燕山村), Yanglu Village (羊鹿村), Xihua Village (西花村), Yinhu Village (银湖村), Yanping Village (雁坪村), and Liuhu Village (柳湖村).

== History ==
Yangjiaqiao Town was built in 1995.

== Geography ==
Jinqiao Reservoir (金桥水库), Longhua Reservoir (龙华水库), Quantang Reservoir (泉塘水库) and Gaoyetang Reservoir (高叶塘水库) are located in the town.

Lieyanjin River (列雁金河) flows through the town.

== Economy ==
Agriculture is the primary occupation. Rice and pig are important products.

== Education ==
15 primary schools and five Middle schools are located with the town.

== Culture ==
Huaguxi is the most influential local theater.
