= Yisuhe =

Yisuhe Town 易俗河镇
- Town
- Location in Hunan
- Coordinates: 27°46′25″N 112°57′21″E
- Country: People's Republic of China
- Province: Hunan
- Prefecture-level city: Xiangtan
- County: Xiangtan

Area
  - Total: 73.24 km^{2} (28.28 sq mi)

Population
  - Total: 60,283
  - Density: 823.1/km^{2} (2,132/sq mi)
- Time zone: UTC+8 (China Standard)
- Postal code: 411200
- Area code: 0732

Yisuhe Town (simplified Chinese: 易俗河镇; traditional Chinese: 易俗河鎮; pinyin: Yìsúhé Zhèn) is an urban town and the seat of Xiangtan County in Hunan, China. As of the 2000 census it had a population of 60,283 and an area of 73.24 square kilometres (28.28 sq mi).

== History ==
Yisuhe Town was built in 1950. In November 1992, Yisuhe Township merged with Shangma Township (上马乡).

== Administrative divisions ==
The town is divided into 17 villages and eight communities, which include the following areas: Baihua Community (百花社区), Fuhaoge Community (富豪阁社区), Zhaojiazhou Community (赵家洲社区), Wujiaxiang Community (吴家巷社区), Fengxingshan Community (凤形山社区), Niutouling Community (牛头岭社区), Chengtang Community (城塘社区), Yanjing Community (砚井社区), Yantang Village (烟塘村), Yunlong Village (云龙村), Shantang Village (山塘村), Qingguang Village (青光村), Chihu Village (赤湖村), Bajiao Village (八角村), Shangma Village (上马村), Shuizhu Village (水竹村), Jinxia Village (金霞村), Jingzhu Village (京竹村), Qingshi Village (青狮村), Fujiang Village (赋江村), Yangxi Village (杨溪村), Zhangshu Village (樟树村), Shanyin Village (杉荫村), Hezhou Village (河洲村), and Yintang Village (银塘村).

== Geography ==
The town beside Xiang River, and Xiangtan City across Xiang River. Yisu River (易俗河) is known as "Juan River" (涓水), a tributary of the Xiang River, it flows through the town, it originated from Zhurong Mountain (祝融峰) in the Heng Mountains.

== Transportation ==
The major highways are the 107 National Road (107国道) and the 320 National Road (320国道).

== Culture ==
Huaguxi is the most influential local theater.

== Celebrity ==
- Luo Yinong, revolutionist.
