= Longkou, Xiangtan =

Longkou Township
- Township

Chinese transcription(s)
  - Simplified: 龙口乡
  - Traditional: 龍口鄉
  - Pinyin: Lóngkoǔ Xiāng
- Location in China
- Coordinates: 27°28′24″N 112°42′11″E
- Country: People's Republic of China
- Province: Hunan
- City: Xiangtan
- County: Xiangtan County

Area
  - Total: 60.23 km^{2} (23.25 sq mi)

Population
  - Total: 29,200
  - Density: 485/km^{2} (1,260/sq mi)
- Time zone: UTC+8 (China Standard)
- Postal code: 411200
- Area code: 0732

Longkou Township (simplified Chinese: 龙口乡; traditional Chinese: 龍口鄉; pinyin: Lóngkoǔ Xiāng) is a rural township in Xiangtan County, Xiangtan City, Hunan Province, People's Republic of China. As of the 2000 census it had a population of 29,215 and an area of 60.23 square kilometres (23.25 sq mi).

== Administrative divisions ==
The township is divided into 20 villages, which include the following areas: Jianlou Village (见楼村), Xingyun Village (兴云村), Dongjiaping Village (董家坪村), Longkou Village (龙口村), Dajiang Village (大江村), Changshoucun Village (长寿村), Niwan Village (泥湾村), Tanxi Village (潭溪村), Jiuru Village (九如村), Nongzi Village (弄子村), Jinzi Village (金子村), Hongling Village (红岭村), Shaojiang Village (潲江村), Pipa Village (琵琶村), Tianlong Village (天龙村), Jinbao Village (金宝村), Rihua Village (日华村), Tuanjian Village (团建村), Ziqiao Village (紫桥村), and Shipai Village (石牌村).

== History ==
In 1950, Longkou Township was built.

== Economy ==
The Region abounds with gypsum.

Rice, fish, pig, bamboo and peanut are important to the economy.

== Culture ==
Huaguxi is the most influence local theater.
