= Cha'ensi, Xiangtan =

Cha'ensi Town 茶恩寺镇
- Town
- Location in Hunan
- Coordinates: 27°23′13″N 112°51′59″E
- Country: People's Republic of China
- Province: Hunan
- Prefecture-level city: Xiangtan
- County: Xiangtan

Area
  - Total: 136.77 km^{2} (52.81 sq mi)

Population
  - Total: 43,200
  - Density: 316/km^{2} (818/sq mi)
- Time zone: UTC+8 (China Standard)
- Postal code: 411200
- Area code: 0732

Cha'ensi Town (simplified Chinese: 茶恩寺镇; traditional Chinese: 茶恩寺鎮; pinyin: Chá'ēnsì Zhèn) is an urban town in and subdivision of Xiangtan County, Hunan Province, People's Republic of China. It's surrounded by Huashi Town and Longkou Township on the west, Baishi Township Town on the north, Sanjiang Township on the east, and Changjiang Town on the south. As of the 2000 census it had a population of 43,205 and an area of 136.77 square kilometres (52.81 sq mi).

== Administrative divisions ==
The town is divided into 30 villages and 1 community, which include the following areas: Cha'ensi Community (茶恩寺社区), Shangfeng Village (上峰村), Wujia Village (吴家村), Huxiang Village (护湘村), Qingping Village (青坪村), Xiongshi Village (熊市村), Fantian Village (樊田村), Fuqiao Village (扶桥村), Nongzi Village (弄子村), Shuangyang Village (双阳村), Zhangshuwan Village (樟树湾村), Huafang Village (花房村), Shuangjiang Village (双江村), Heyue Village (荷月村), Jinbaochong Village (金宝冲村), Chahua Village (茶花村), Longjing Village (龙井村), Jinping Village (金坪村), Shuangfeng Village (双凤村), Huilong Village (回龙村), Baitang Village (柏塘村), Xiaohua Village (晓花村), Huaqian Village (花桥村), Tanghua Village (棠花村), Quanping Village (泉坪村), Xingyue Village (星月村), Dongshan Village (东山村), Xiangheng Village (湘衡村), Qianjia Village (千家村), Yangxi Village (杨溪村), and Fuxing Village (复兴村).

== History ==
The town's name was come from a Buddhism temple "Cha'en Temple" (茶恩寺), Cha'en Temple was built in Ming Dynasty.

In May 1952, Cha'en Township was built. In June 1956, it was renamed "Cha'ensi Township". In January 1994, Cha'ensi Town was built.

== Economy ==
The region abounds with granite.

Bamboo and Chinese chestnut important to the economy.

== Culture ==
Huaguxi is the most influential local theater.
