= Qingshanqiao, Xiangtan =

Qingshanqiao 青山桥镇
- Town
- Etymology: 青山, Qīngshān ("green mountains"); 桥, qiáo ("bridge")
- Location in Hunan
- Coordinates: 27°29′42″N 112°34′10″E
- Country: People's Republic of China
- Province: Hunan
- Prefecture-level city: Xiangtan
- County: Xiangtan County

Area
  - Total: 109.37 km^{2} (42.23 sq mi)

Population
  - Total: 46,788
  - Density: 427.80/km^{2} (1,108.0/sq mi)
- Time zone: UTC+8 (China Standard)
- Postal code: 411218
- Area code: 0732

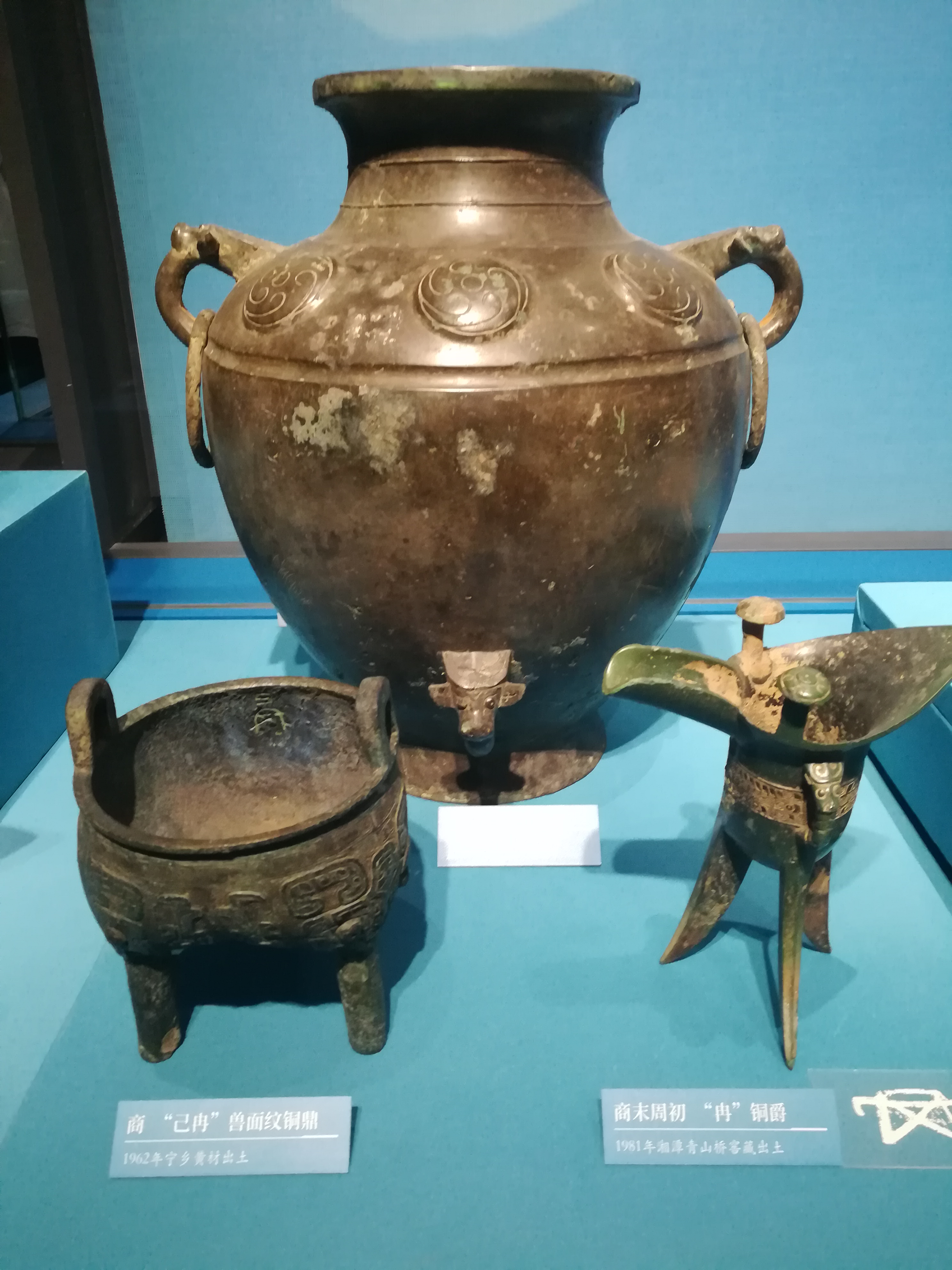
Bronze Ding, unearthed in Huangcai Town of Ningxiang, Hunan in 1962. Bronze Jue, unearthed in Qingshanqiao Town of Xiangtan, Hunan in 1981. Hunan Museum.

Qingshanqiao (simplified Chinese: 青山桥镇; traditional Chinese: 青山橋鎮; pinyin: Qīngshānqiáo Zhèn) is a rural town in Xiangtan County, Hunan Province, China. It is surrounded by Heye Town to the west, Fenshui Township to the north, Paitou Township and Longkou Township to the east, and Changqing Township to the south. As of the 2006 census it had a population of 46,788 and an area of 109.37 square kilometres (42.23 sq mi).

== Administrative divisions ==
The town is divided into 40 villages and 1 community:

- Qingshan Community (青山社区)
- Qingshanqiao Village (青山桥村)
- Xinpu Village (新铺村)
- Xiaonan Village (晓南村)
- Shangfang Village (上方村)
- Shalin Village (沙林村)
- Dahe Village (大河村)
- Caoyi Village (草衣村)
- Songbai Village (松柏村)
- Fuchong Village (扶冲村)
- Yanyan Village (燕岩村)
- Sijing Village (四境村)
- Gaoshansi Village (高山寺村)
- Gaotun Village (高屯村)
- Fengping Village (凤坪村)
- Hejia Village (和家村)
- Xinyang Village (新阳村)
- Malan Village (马栏村)
- Longshu Village (龙书村)
- Long'an Village (龙安村)
- Changtang Village (菖塘村)
- Fushi Village (富石村)
- Fuxiao Village (富晓村)
- Guanshan Village (观山村)
- Sanfu Village (三富村)
- Qunqiang Village (群强村)
- Xintian Village (心田村)
- Qiaotou Village (桥头村)
- Guangfu Village (光福村)
- Lianxing Village (联兴村)
- Aiguo Village (爱国村)
- Shibantang Village (石板塘村)
- Longwu Village (龙舞村)
- Dacang Village (大仓村)
- Shitang Village (石塘村)
- Aoyu Village (鳌鱼村)
- Xialing Village (霞岭村)
- Jinshi Village (金狮村)
- Tiantang Village (天堂村)
- Gaoqing Village (高青村)
- Shimen Village (石门村)

== Geography ==
Qingshan River (青山河), a tributary of the Xiang River, flows through the town.

== Economy ==
The region abounds with uranium mine.

Rice and pig are important to the economy.

== Culture ==
Huaguxi is the most influential local theater.

== Attractions ==
Jin'ao Peak (锦鳌峰), with a height of 755.1 metres (2,477 ft) above sea level, is a famous tourist attraction in the town.

== See also ==
- Qingshanqiao, Ningxiang County
