= Jinshi Township, Hunan =

Jinshi Township 锦石乡
- Township
- Location in Hunan
- Coordinates: 27°35′48″N 112°44′28″E
- Country: People's Republic of China
- Province: Hunan
- Prefecture-level city: Xiangtan
- County: Xiangtan County

Area
  - Total: 56.7 km^{2} (21.9 sq mi)

Population
  - Total: 29,800
  - Density: 526/km^{2} (1,360/sq mi)
- Time zone: UTC+8 (China Standard)
- Postal code: 411200
- Area code: 0732

Jinshi Township (simplified Chinese: 锦石乡; traditional Chinese: 錦石鄉; pinyin: Jǐnshí Xiāng) is a rural township in Xiangtan County, Hunan Province, People's Republic of China. As of the 2000 census it had a population of 29,896 and an area of 56.7 square kilometres (21.9 sq mi).

== Administrative divisions ==
As of 2018 the township administers 11 villages: Tangjiahu Village (唐家湖村), Jinhu Village (金湖村), Jinshi Village (锦石村), Wenjia Village (文佳村), Taiyang Village (太阳村), Shengli Village (胜利村), Biquan Village (碧泉村), Qingtang Village (清塘村), Dongjian Village (东剑村), Dongbian New Village (东边新村), and Dahetang Village (大荷塘村).

== Attractions ==
Biquan Deep (碧泉潭) is the scenic spot in the town.

== Culture ==
Huaguxi is the most influential form of local theater.
