= Fang Keli =

Chinese philosopher (1938–2020)

- Born: June 28, 1938; Xiangtan, China
- Died: April 21, 2020 (aged 81); Beijing, China

Education
- Education: Renmin University

Fang Keli (Chinese: 方克立; pinyin: Fāng Kèlì; 28 June 1938 – 21 April 2020) was a Chinese New Confucian philosopher and a member of the Chinese Communist Party. He was best known for his work in New Confucianism and his theories which attempt to fusion Marxism and Chinese culture.

== Early life ==
Fang Keli was born in June 1938 in Xiangtan, Hunan, China. His father, Fang Zhuangyou, was a historian and professor at Wuhan University. His mother was a chief-leader of Women's Work, also at Wuhan University. Fang said that, “[he] was, naturally, influenced by [his] family’s tradition both intellectually and culturally. But growing up [Fang] was influenced more greatly by the historical period, the collective life in school and the education [he] got from the Communist Party and [his] teachers.”

As a student Fang earned high marks and was a leader in both the Young Pioneers and the Communist Youth League. One year prior to his enrollment at Renmin University, the Anti-Rightist campaign began and Fang was disciplined by the Communist Youth League for undisclosed reasons. He cites this as an “important turning point in [his] life.”

In 1958, Fang was sent to work in rural Beijing where he would partake in hard labor for six months. In July 1962, he graduated from Renmin University's philosophy department. Then, between 1964 and 1965, Fang participated in the Four Clean-ups of the Socialist Education Movement. In 1969, Fang was made to enroll in the cadre's school at the People's University in Jiangxi province where he would become an active worker and gain first-hand experience with social reform.

== Career ==
Fang published his first major work, The Theory of the Unity of Knowing and Doing in Chinese Philosophical History, in 1982. It was one of the first books concerning Chinese philosophy to be published after the Cultural Revolution.

Fang's interests were broad through the early 1980s, a time which saw the scholar making contributions in such topics as the distinction between Chinese concepts of “Tao” and “Qi.”

The latter half of the 1980s, continuing into the 1990s marked a new phase in which ruxue began to receive consideration as a means of “sinicizing” Marxism in China. In 1986, Fang, then working at Nankai University in Tianjin, helped to found an academic group of over 50 researchers which studied Contemporary New Confucianism, or Contemporary New Ru Learning (Dangdai xin ruxue). This undertaking would span a decade's time, making it the most costly and extensive humanities project ever sponsored by China's Ministry of Education.

From 1994 to 2000 Fang served as President of the Graduate School of Chinese Academy of Social Sciences. He was elected an academician of the Chinese Academy of Social Sciences in 2006.

== Philosophy ==
The 1986 research team would lead Fang to conclude that, as of the May 4th Movement, New Ru Learning, Marxism and Western liberalism were most prominent schools of thought in the nation. This equivocation of New Ru Learning and Marxism pushed the former to an elevated status in the public eye, despite Fang's protests. Contrary to the public clamor for New Ru Learning, Fang saw ruxue as a fundamentally feudal ideology—though he still believed there was historical and cultural value to be derived from it. He explained that all ideologies, their predecessors and their successors function within the context of one another. In this way all ideas retain a level of relevance.

Fang championed the idea of critical inheritance, which he developed from the philosophy of his contemporary, Zhang Dainian. Though similar ideas had been promulgated as early as the old Chinese idiom, develop what is positive and discard what is negative (qu zao qu jing), Zhang's rendition was different in that it factored the West into its equation. Zhang sought to first divide traditional Chinese culture into its dross and its essence, its worthy and unworthy, then to do the same with Western culture and synthesize the two to achieve a ‘synthetic creation.’ Of this, Fang said:

“I personally accepted the cultural propositions of the school of comprehensive innovation represented by Mr. Zhang, and I summarized the basic ideas of this school in the following words: to make the past serve the present; to make foreign things serve China; to be critical of inheritance and comprehensively innovate.”

Fang sought to combine Chinese culture with Marxism and thereby create an improved society. Relative to some of his peers, he was quite moderate and condemned more essentialist positions:

“…I approve of the theory of cultural comprehensive innovation instead of “Cultural Radicalism” or “Cultural Conservatism”. Based on this kind of cultural standpoint, I believe that the way of “wholesale Westernization” and “the revival of Confucianism” will go nowhere in China.”

Fang did not wish for a revival of Ruism, nor did he want China to be thoroughly Westernized. Delving further into Zhang's model of synthetic creation, Fang laid out four tenets for cultural application. Firstly, one must have an open mindset which is malleable and thoughtful. Second, neither Chinese culture nor Western culture should be overly dominant. For synthesis, it is important to keep Chinese tradition and to then learn from the West. Third, the manner of critical inheritance ought not to be metaphysical, but rather dialectical. Lastly, Fang likens the process to eating and digestion: one must combine unlike elements and then convert them into positive energy.

Fang has taught for over 45 years at various universities. He cited teaching as his main work, ranking it above even his highly regarded work as a researcher. Fang viewed many of his research-related endeavors as ultimately serving to educate the younger generation.

== Conflicting perspectives ==
For his work on the New Ru Learning project, Fang was criticized for angling towards his Marxist inclinations—Li Minghui argued that rather than assessing New Ru Learning objectively, Fang actively worked to funnel the study into his own ideology.

In 1989, Jiang Qing, a controversial Confucian thinker, published an article in which he identified the failure to revive Confucianism as China's greatest problem. He suggested that “Confucianism should replace Marxism, be restored to its lofty historical status, and become the orthodox thought representing the life and spirit of the Chinese nation.”

== Selected works ==
- History of Chinese Philosophy: the Theory of Knowing and Doing, People's Publishing Press, 1982, 1986, 1997
- Modern Neo-Confucianism and Chinese Modernization, Tianjing People's Press, 1997
- Critical Inheritance and Comprehensive Innovation, in Traditional Culture and Modernization, March 1995
