= Shigu, Hunan =

Shigu Town 石鼓镇
- Town
- Location in Hunan
- Coordinates: 27°31′34″N 112°30′08″E
- Country: People's Republic of China
- Province: Hunan
- Prefecture-level city: Xiangtan
- County: Xiangtan

Area
  - Total: 96.5 km^{2} (37.3 sq mi)

Population
  - Total: 49,600
  - Density: 514/km^{2} (1,330/sq mi)
- Time zone: UTC+8 (China Standard)
- Postal code: 411200
- Area code: 0732

Shigu Town (simplified Chinese: 石鼓镇; traditional Chinese: 石鼓鎮; pinyin: Shígǔ Zhèn) is an urban town in Xiangtan County, Hunan Province, People's Republic of China. As of the 2000 census it had a population of 49,645 and an area of 96.5 square kilometres (37.3 sq mi).

== Administrative divisions ==
The town is divided into 1 villages and 34 community, which include the following areas: Daqiao Community (大桥社区), Dingfeng Village (顶峰村), Tongliang Village (铜梁村), Shuanghe Village (双河村), Shantianchong Village (山田冲村), Qunxing Village (群星村), Xiema Village (歇马村), Dapingtai Village (大坪台村), Yanhong Village (沿红村), Zhutang Village (竹塘村), Lukou Village (路口村), Yunxia Village (云霞村), Shihutang Village (石湖塘村), Fuxiao Village (福霄村), Gaojiaping Village (高家坪村), Xichong Village (西冲村), Hualou Village (花楼村), Hairong Village (海荣村), Shigu Village (石鼓村), Wanjia Village (万家村), Zhushan Village (珠山村), Ouchong Village (欧冲村), Jiangjun Village (将军村), Anle Village (安乐村), Xingwang Village (兴旺村), Sushanzui Village (粟山嘴村), Senmei Village (森梅村), Longduan Village (龙段村), Daoguan Village (道贯村), Zhulian Village (珠联村), Xiangyang Village (向阳村), Qijiaping Village (七家坪村), Taipingshan Village (太平山村), Wujiazui Village (五家嘴村), and Silu Village (四路村).

== Geography ==
Chang Mountain (昌山) and Tongliang Mountain (铜梁山) are scenic spots in the town.

Tongliang Reservoir (铜梁水库), was built in 1958. Xiangshuitan Reservoir (响水潭水库), Shiyi Reservoir (十一水库), Jiangjun Reservoir (将军水库), Chishuituo Reservoir (吃水拓水库) and Batang Reservoir (坝塘水库) are located in the town.

== Economy ==
The region abounds with marble.

Sweet potato is important to the economy.

== Education ==
There are 14 primary schools, 3 Middle schools located with the town.

== Culture ==
Huaguxi is the most influential local theater.
