= Paitou Township =

Paitou Township 排头乡
- Township
- Location in Hunan
- Coordinates: 27°33′20″N 112°40′33″E
- Country: People's Republic of China
- Province: Hunan
- Prefecture-level city: Xiangtan
- County: Xiangtan

Area
  - Total: 130.4 km^{2} (50.3 sq mi)

Population
  - Total: 63,700
  - Density: 488/km^{2} (1,270/sq mi)
- Time zone: UTC+8 (China Standard)
- Postal code: 411200
- Area code: 0732

Paitou Township (simplified Chinese: 排头乡; traditional Chinese: 排頭鄉; pinyin: Paítoú Xiāng) is a rural township in Xiangtan County, Hunan Province, People's Republic of China. It's surrounded by Fenshui Township on the west, Wushi Town on the north, Jinshi Town on the east, and Huashi Town on the south. As of the 2000 census it had a population of 63,755 and an area of 103.4 square kilometres (39.9 sq mi).

== Administrative divisions ==
The township is divided into 42 villages, which include the following areas: Dafuchong Village (大扶冲村), Chenshan Village (辰山村), Zishan Village (紫山村), Huangjingping Village (黄荆坪村), Xiashan Village (霞山村), Anquan Village (安全村), Zhinan Village (指南村), Shuangquan Village (双泉村), Dongshan Village (东山村), Changshan Village (长山村), Xingxing Village (星星村), Renbei Village (仁陂村), Chuanxingshan Village (船形山村), Yantang Village (严塘村), Aozhou Village (鳌洲村), Songzi Village (松梓村), Yanchong Village (严冲村), Longtan Village (龙潭村), Xuejia Village (雪佳村), Cangchong Village (仓冲村), Yuetang Village (月塘村), Huilongqiao Village (回龙桥村), Tongxin Village (同心村), Paitou Village (排头村), Outang Village (藕塘村), Gaobeitang Village (高陂塘村), Siyin Village (四印村), Yangjialing Village (杨家岭村), Hongwei Village (红卫村), Zhongjia Village (中加村), Haoguang Village (毫光村), Hexing Village (合兴村), Nanqiao Village (南桥村), Xiangnan Village (湘南村), Shangnan Village (上南村), Liutian Village (留田村), Xingyang Village (兴阳村), Louchong Village (楼冲村), Heyun Village (合云村), Tongzi Village (桐梓村), Yanhua Village (延化村), and Shigang Village (石岗村).

== History ==
In 1995, Paitou Township was built.

== Geography ==
Yin Mountain (隐山) is the scenic spot in the town.

Liutian Reservoir (留田水库) and Yanchong Reservoir (严冲水库) are located in the township

== Economy ==
Pig and rice are important to the economy.

== Attractions ==
- Zuo Zongtang's Former Residence, was built in Qing Dynasty.
- Zhou Xiaozhou's Former Residence, was built in Qing Dynasty.

== Culture ==
Huaguxi is the most influential local theater.

== Celebrity ==
- Zuo Zongtang, politician.
- Zhang Shengjie, musician.
- Zhou Xiaozhou, politician.
