= Shitan, Xiangtan =

Shitan Town 石潭镇
- Town
- Location in Hunan
- Coordinates: 27°45′27″N 112°43′06″E
- Country: People's Republic of China
- Province: Hunan
- Prefecture-level city: Xiangtan
- County: Xiangtan

Area
  - Total: 124.3 km^{2} (48.0 sq mi)

Population
  - Total: 74,000
  - Density: 600/km^{2} (1,500/sq mi)
- Time zone: UTC+8 (China Standard)
- Postal code: 411200
- Area code: 0732

Shitan Town (simplified Chinese: 石潭镇; traditional Chinese: 石潭鎮; pinyin: Shítán Zhèn) is an urban town in Xiangtan County, Hunan Province, People's Republic of China. As of the 2010 census it had a population of 74,000 and an area of 124.3 square kilometres (48.0 sq mi).

== Administrative divisions ==
The town is divided into 42 villages and 4 communities, which include the following areas:

- Zhengjie Community (正街社区)
- Hengjie Community (横街社区)
- Shanmuqiao Community (杉木桥社区)
- Yaoshang Community (窑上社区)
- Shuangma Village (双马村)
- Maqiao Village (马桥村)
- Raotian Village (饶田村)
- Kengshan Village (坑山村)
- Zhongtang Village (中塘村)
- Lianbin Village (涟滨村)
- Ziyun Village (紫云村)
- Yangzi Village (杨梓村)
- Guangrong Village (光荣村)
- Baituo Village (白托村)
- Wenjiatan Village (文佳滩村)
- Caotang Village (草塘村)
- Honhwang Village (洪望村)
- Maotang Village (毛塘村)
- Zhongba Village (中坝村)
- Tunxia Village (饨下村)
- Xinwei Village (新桅村)
- Longquan Village (龙泉村)
- Liema Village (列马村)
- Shangyue Village (上月村)
- Puqing Village (普庆村)
- Hede Village (合德村)
- Ganlutang Village (甘露塘村)
- Longgutang Village (龙骨塘村)
- Qingshanzui Village (青山嘴村)
- Fengshuting Village (枫树亭村)
- Xinzhuang Village (新庄村)
- Xinhe Village (新合村)
- Xiangshao Village (向韶村)
- Furongtang Village (芙蓉塘村)
- Bajiaoting Village (八角亭村)
- Jiulong Village (九龙村)
- Tonghu Village (通湖村)
- Fenshui Village (分水村)
- Bailong Village (白龙村)
- Lianhuaba Village (莲花坝村)
- Gucheng Village (古城村)
- Guyun Village (古云村)
- Shizhutang Village (莳竹塘村)
- Zhaotuo Village (兆托村)
- Tuoxia Village (托下村)
- Lianmeng Village (联盟村)

== History ==
In May 1955, Shitan Town was built.

== Economy ==
Rice is important to the economy.

== Culture ==
Huaguxi is the most influential local theater.
