= Huashi, Xiangtan =

Huashi Town 花石镇
- Town
- Location in Hunan
- Coordinates: 27°30′54″N 112°43′16″E
- Country: People's Republic of China
- Province: Hunan
- Prefecture-level city: Xiangtan
- County: Xiangtan

Area
  - Total: 133.4 km^{2} (51.5 sq mi)

Population
  - Total: 20,500
  - Density: 154/km^{2} (398/sq mi)
- Time zone: UTC+8 (China Standard)
- Postal code: 411218
- Area code: 0732

Huashi Town (simplified Chinese: 花石镇; traditional Chinese: 花石鎮; pinyin: Huāshí Zhèn) is an urban town in Xiangtan County, Hunan Province, People's Republic of China. It's surrounded by Paitou Township on the west, Shebu Town on the north, Zijingshan Town on the east, and Cha'ensi Town on the south. As of the 2000 census it had a population of 54,941 and an area of 133.4 square kilometres (51.5 sq mi).

== Administrative divisions ==
The town is divided into 31 villages and 1 community, which include the following areas: Huashi Community (花石社区), Qixing Village (七星村), Qianjin Village (前进村), Hetou Village (河头村), Malong Village (马垅村), Chaoshang Village (超上村), Luohan Village (罗汉村), Changling Village (长岭村), Shuangxi Village (双溪村), Jinlian Village (金莲村), Qiling Village (棋岭村), Furong Village (芙蓉村), Xinhua Village (新华村), Tongluo Village (铜锣村), Shuinan Village (水南村), Zijing Village (紫荆村), Zhongxin Village (中心村), Beidou Village (北斗村), Tianma Village (天马村), Xinghe Village (兴合村), Shiba Village (石坝村), Zhaojiaying Village (赵家营村), Juanjiang Village (涓江村), Yanbu Village (盐埠村), Jintang Village (金塘村), Jinfeng Village (金丰村), Yanfu Village (盐浮村), Yongren Village (永仁村), Yongfeng Village (永丰村), Yuanyi Village (园艺村), Dongxiao Village (东晓村), and Runtang Village (润塘村).

== History ==
In 1985, Huashi Township was built. In 1995, Huashi Town was built.

== Geography ==
Yisu River (易俗河) is known as "Juan River"(涓水), a tributary of the Xiang River, it flows through the town.

Huashi Reservoir (花石水库), was built in August 1959, is located in the town.

== Economy ==
Lotus seed is important to the economy.

== Education ==
There are 10 primary schools, one Middle school and one high school located with the town.

== Culture ==
Huaguxi is the most influential local theater.

== Attractions ==
Hancheng Bridge (汉城桥) was built in Qing Dynasty. Guanzheng Bridge (观政桥) was built in 1755. They are famous tourist attractions.
