= Shigu, Ghana =

Place in Ghana

Shigu is a community in Tamale Metropolitan District in the Northern Region of Ghana It has Garizegu, Changnaayili, and Nangbagu Yapala as it’s neighboring communities.

== See also ==
- Suburbs of Tamale (Ghana) metropolis
