= Huashida =

Huashida (华师大; lit. 'China Normal University') may refer to:

- Central China Normal University, a public university in Wuhan, Hubei
- East China Normal University, a public university in Shanghai
- South China Normal University, a public university in Guangzhou, Guangdong
