= Chen Pengnian =

Chinese politician and scholar in the Qing dynasty

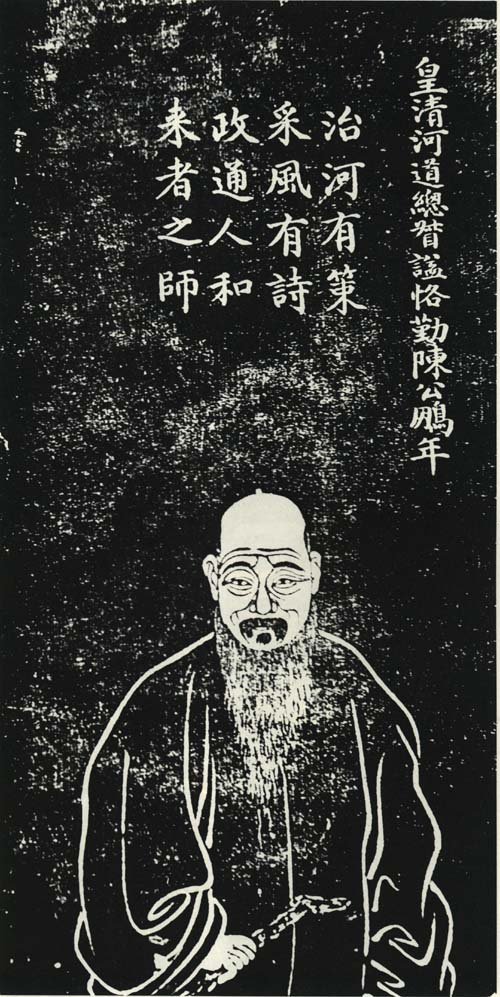
Chen Pengnian

Chen Pengnian (Chinese: 陳鵬年; pinyin: Chén péngnián; Wade–Giles: Ch’ên P’êng-nien, 10 January 1664 – 9 February 1723) was a Han Chinese politician and scholar in the Qing dynasty.

== Biography ==
Chen Pengnian
- Traditional Chinese: 陳鵬年
- Simplified Chinese: 陈鹏年
Transcriptions
Standard Mandarin
- Hanyu Pinyin: Chén péngnián

Posthumous name
- Chinese: 恪勤
Transcriptions
Standard Mandarin
- Hanyu Pinyin: Kèqín

Chen was a native of Xiangtan, Hunan. He spent much of his early life in the mountains where his family fled to avoid the disturbances of the Revolt of the Three Feudatories. During this time, he studied the classics and took the imperial examination upon his return to Xiangtan. He obtained a jinshi degree in 1691. He began his official career five years later as a magistrate in Xian, Zhejiang, before occupying the same post in Shanyang, Jiangsu. His upright and incorruptible character became renowned. Chen was a model official, earning the nickname “Chen Qingtian” for his honesty and frugality. From 1703 to 1705, he served as prefect of Nanjing. During this time, his superior, Ašan, governor-general of Jiangsu, falsely accused Chen of bribery and establishing lecture halls in former brothels. Chen was sentenced to death but given an imperial pardon by the Kangxi Emperor, who put him on a commission to edit the Sichao shi (四朝詩), an anthology of Song, Jin, Yuan, and Ming poetry.

Chen was appointed prefect of Suzhou in 1708 and acting-financial commissioner of Jiangsu in 1709. In 1711, Gali, the governor-general of Jiangsu, accused Chen of treason for a poem he wrote; however, these charges were dismissed by the emperor. Chen was then summoned to Beijing and from 1719 to 1722, he worked on the compilation of a phrase dictionary, Fenlei zi jin. He later participated in an official survey of the Grand Canal before he was appointed director-general of Yellow River Conservancy in Henan in 1721. He served in this post until his death in 1723. He was canonized as Keqin (恪勤).

During his lifetime, Chen authored collections of prose works as well as treatises on public administration and river conservancy.
