= Xiangtan County =

Xiangtan County 湘潭县 Siangtan
- County
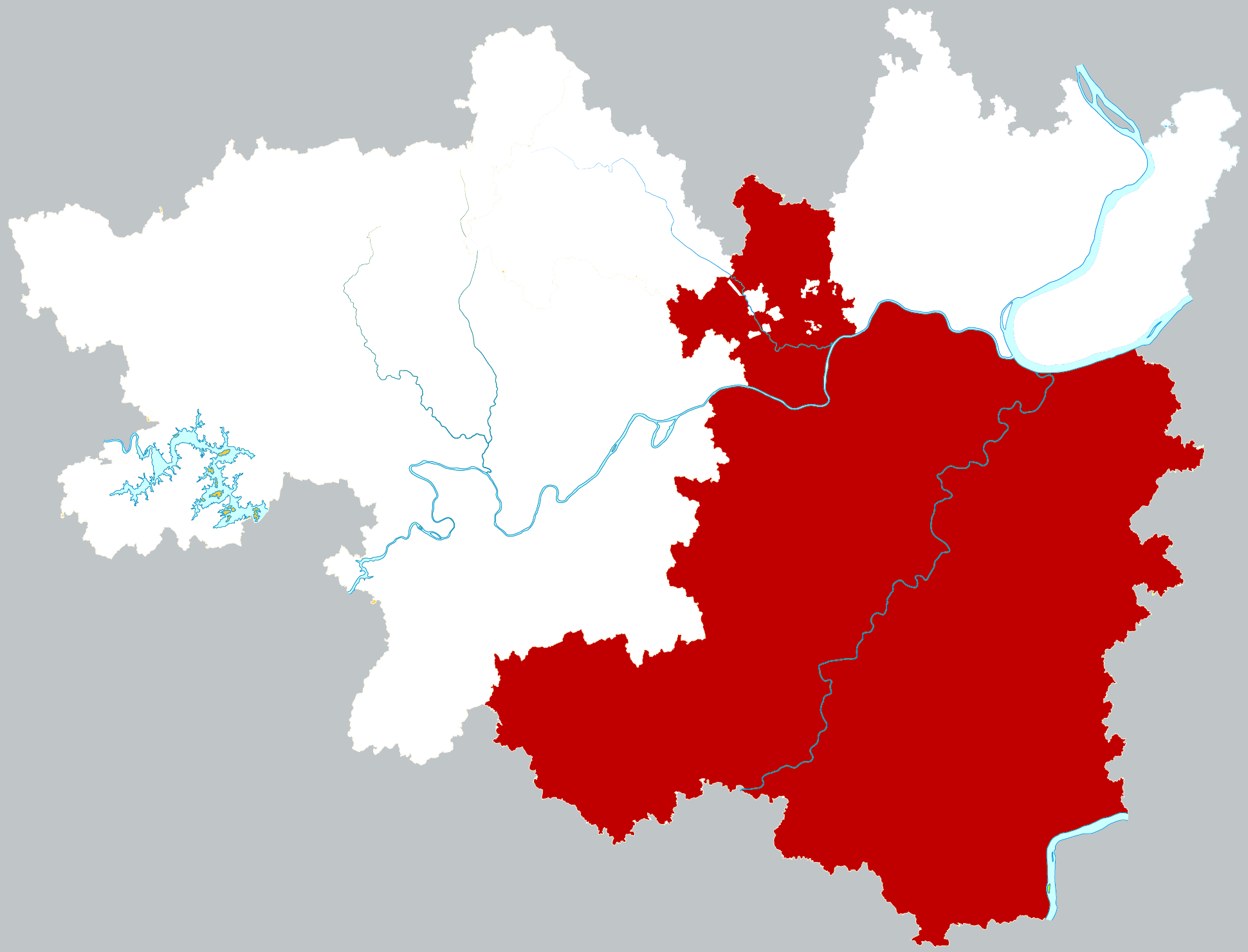
- Location of Xiangtan County within Xiangtan

- Location in Hunan
- Coordinates: 27°46′48″N 112°57′02″E
- Country: People's Republic of China
- Province: Hunan
- Prefecture-level city: Xiangtan

Area
  - Total: 2,140.01 km^{2} (826.26 sq mi)

Population
  - Total: 792,900
  - Density: 370.5/km^{2} (959.6/sq mi)
- Time zone: UTC+8 (China Standard)

Xiangtan County (simplified Chinese: 湘潭县; traditional Chinese: 湘潭縣; pinyin: Xiāngtán Xiàn) is a county in Hunan Province, China; it is under the administration of Xiangtan City. Located on the east central Hunan, the county is bordered to the north by Yuhu, Yuetang Districts and Xiangtan City, to the west by Xiangxiang City and Shuangfeng County, to the south by Hengshan and Hengdong Counties, and to the east by Zhuzhou County and Tianyuan District of Zhuzhou City. Xiangtan County covers an area of 2,132.80 km^{2} (823.48 sq mi), and as of 2015, it had a registered population of 979,600 and a resident population of 857,200. The county has 14 towns and 3 townships under its jurisdiction, and the county seat is at Yisuhe Town (易俗河镇).

== Administrative divisions ==
After an adjustment of subdistrict divisions of Xiangtan County on 19 November 2015, Xiangtan County has 14 towns and 3 townships under its jurisdiction. They are:

Name	Hanzi	Population (2005)	Area (Km2)	Note
Yisuhe	易俗河镇	60,200	73.24	
Meilinqiao	梅林桥镇	49,300	138.403	
Tanjiashan	谭家山镇	50,500	100.45	
Zhonglupu	中路铺镇	62,000	183.6	
Cha'ensi	茶恩寺镇	43,200	136.77	
Hekou	河口镇	45,000	93.78	
Shebu	射埠镇	17,000	32	
Huashi	花石镇	20,500	133.4	
Qingshanqiao	青山桥镇	46,700	109.37	
Shigu	石鼓镇	49,600	96.5	
Yunhuqiao	云湖桥镇	62,300	130	
Shitan	石潭镇	74,000	124.3	
Yangjiaqiao	杨嘉桥镇	60,900		
Wushi	乌石镇	37,500	96.12	
Baishi	白石镇	37,900	98	
Fenshui	分水乡	39,800	85.33	
Paitou	排头乡	63,700	130.4	
Longkou	龙口乡	29,200	60.23	
Jinshi	锦石乡	29,800	56.7	
