= Flower-drum opera =

Music genre

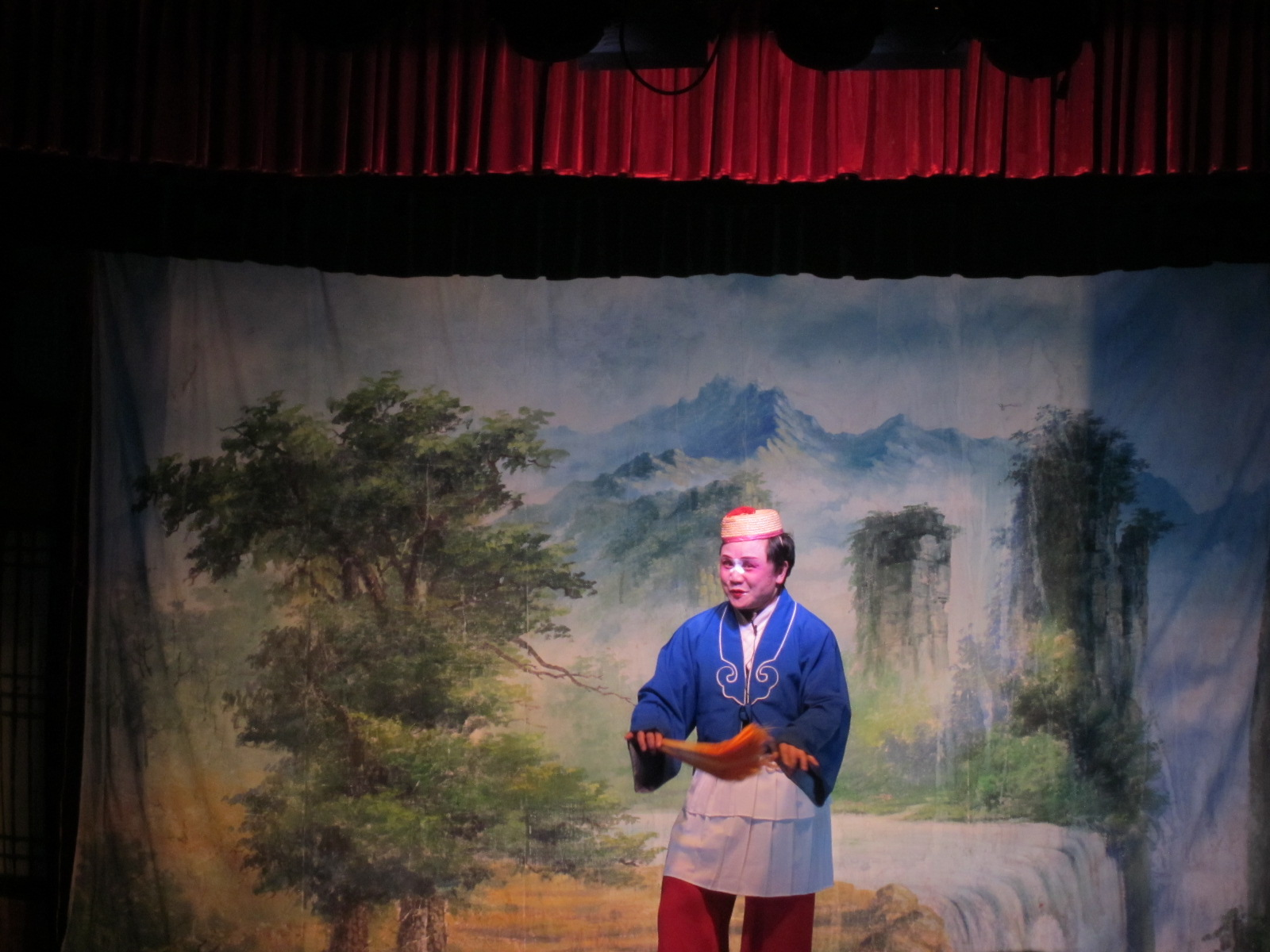
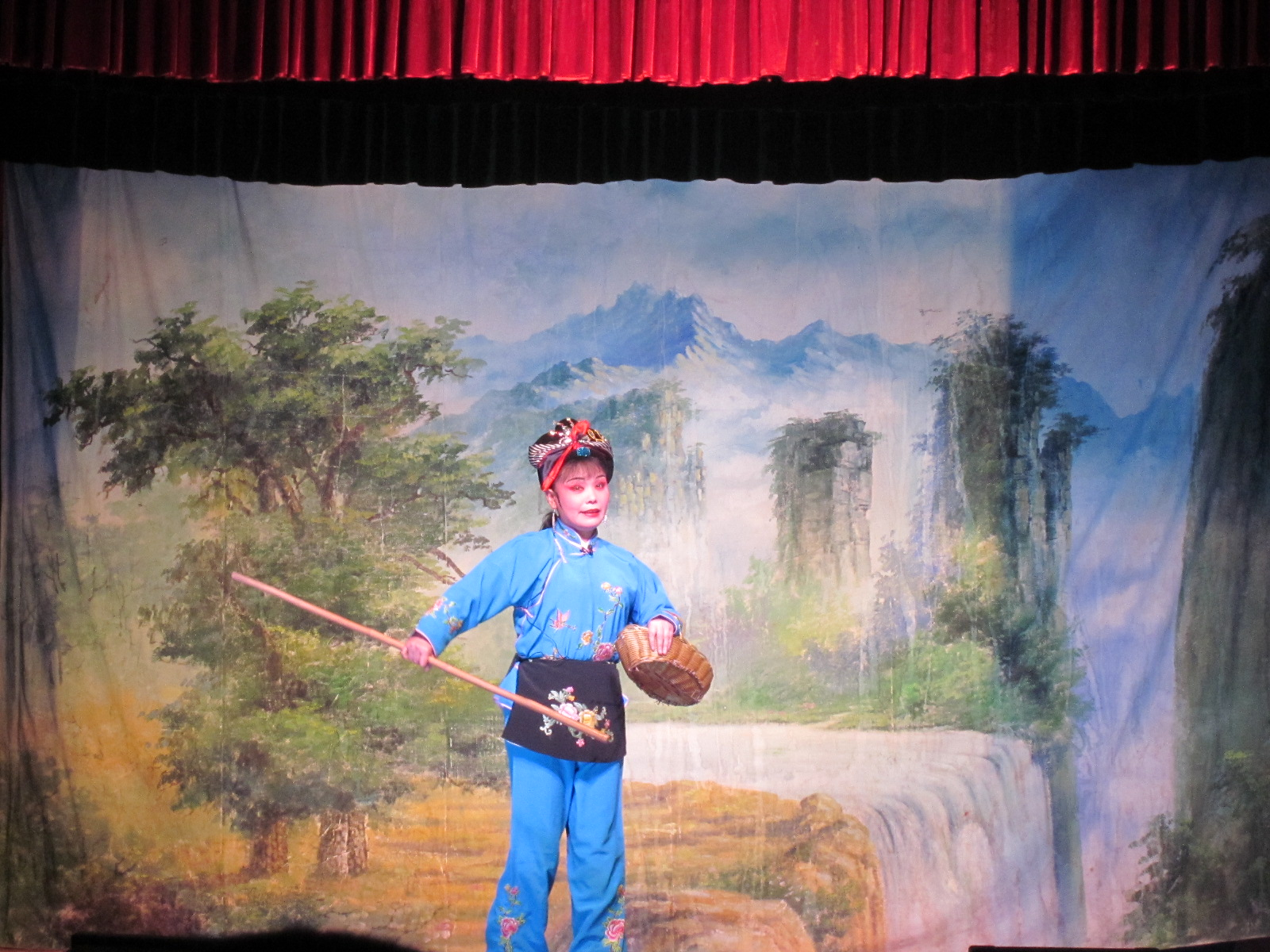
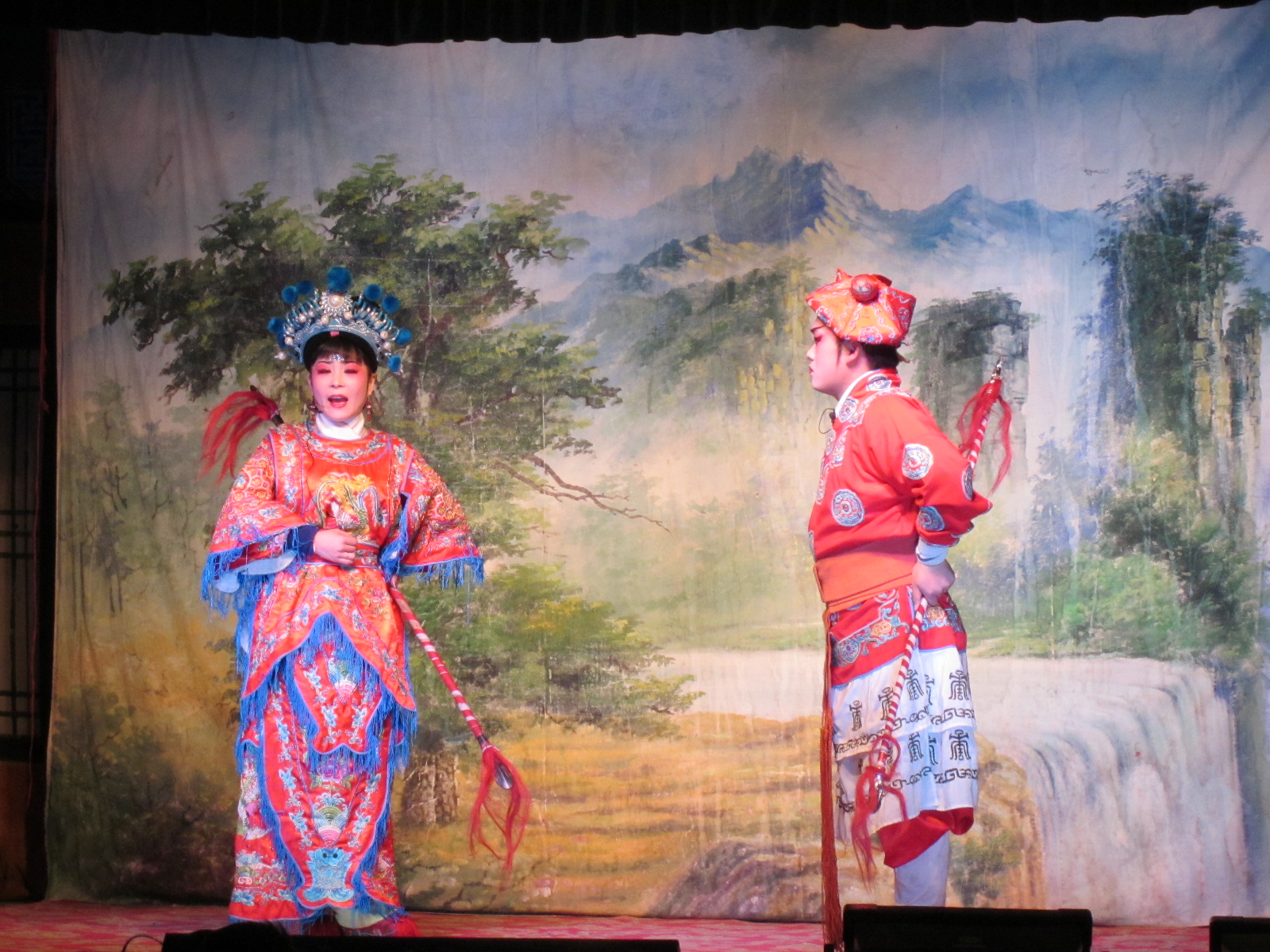
Photos taken from a flower-drum opera in Changsha.

The flower-drum opera or Huaguxi (Chinese: 花鼓戏; pinyin: Huāgǔxì) is a form of Chinese opera originating in Hunan province. Some other provinces, such as Hubei, Anhui, Henan, Shanxi, also have Huaguxi. It is known in China for its earthy quality, and is often referred to as the "spicy" form of Chinese opera.

Most Huaguxi plays were originally xiao xi, short plays lasting an hour or less. These plays often dealt with everyday rural life. With the rise of professional Huaguxi performers and performances in the capital city of Changsha, longer plays, daxi, began to be performed. These plays dealt with grander themes of social satire and class struggle. Like other forms of Chinese opera, Huaguxi is staged with very few props. Music accompanying Huaguxi reflects the Changsha dialect spoken in Hunan. It is played with instruments like the datong (fiddle), yueqin (moon lute), dizi (bamboo flute), and suona (oboe). Percussion instruments provide the basic tempo for the performance.

== Origin ==
Originating from songs, Huaguxi can be referred to as early as the reign of Emperor Jiaqing (1760 – 1820) of the Qing dynasty. At that time, the amateur Huaguxi players were mostly farmers. They dressed up in colorful clothes with their faces painted, singing and dancing along the street to celebrate the Spring Festival (Chinese New Year) and Spring Lantern Festival. These singer-dancers were popular among the people in the countryside, leading to the development of Huaguxi as a theatrical form.

The integrated story with songs and dance began during the early 19th century. At that time, there were only two roles: chou, a male clown, and dan, a young girl, both played by a man. Female players were not allowed until the early 20th century. In the 1860s, more roles, including dan, chou, and sheng—a handsome young man—were playing and the performance had developed a lot.

The early Huaguxi lasted only 45 minutes to an hour, and the contents of the performances were mostly related to the rural life of the peasants. Some common scenes were paddling, carrying and loading soybeans. These plays were designed to express people's hopes and wishes for love, life, and harvest. In the late 19th and 20th centuries, some Huaguxi performance groups began to move to Changsha, the capital of Hunan. Huaguxi then lasted for two to three hours. Stories also went beyond activities of daily life. Social satire, religious belief, and immoral behaviors began to be shown on the stage. More roles were included in the plays.

== Reformation ==
In 1952, 'The Three Reformations' on the mandatory formation of xiqu was issued. After describing the evolution of Huaguxi as 'relatively realistically reflect[ing] the working people's wish for [a] free life', it criticizes the form severely:

"After huaguxi entered the international concessions, it gradually became contaminated by the semi-feudal and semi-colonial dust and dirt. In addition, the Manchu ruling class subsequently employed some feudal literati to inject feudal toxin into huaguxi. As a result, huaguxi started to be infused with certain semi-feudal and semi-colonial content during this period. This is huju's main source of subsequent dross".

According to the regulation, Huaguxi players were required to change the content of the plays—to abolish the 'ugly, vulgar' acting style. Some traditional Huaguxi plays were deleted due to their violation of the regulation.

In 1949, there were more than 18 private Huaguxi performance groups in Changsha. In 1952, all performance groups were reorganized. The official Hunan Huaguxi Company was established in Changsha. For the first time Huaguxi had official recognition, funding, and support. In 1957, the Hunan Arts School was established with a department of Huaguxi, which pushed Huaguxi to regulated art forms further.

After the extensive reformation of the traditional Huaguxi, the demand for new plays especially reflecting the new lives of Chinese people became the dominant aim of the artists. According to the Communist Party policy, 'Art must serve [the] people. Art must serve Socialism.' More and more plays written in praise of workers, farmers, and soldiers were created, such as 'Da Tong Luo' (Beating the Gong) by Li Tong Ren, and 'Bu Guo' (Fixing the Pan) by Tan Zhou and Xu Shuhua.

== Contemporary Development ==
In 1981, there were 54 official Huaguxi performance groups in Hunan. In 2008, Huaguxi became an Intangible Cultural Heritage of China. Nowadays, however, people's passion for xiqu has been declining. With rapid economic development, people are more used to Internet entertainments, which have a huge impact on traditional Huaguxi. Fewer artists are creating new Huaguxi plays and the number of Huaguxi performers are dramatically decreasing. How to preserve this traditional art form remains a problem for both the Chinese government and Chinese people.

== Some Famous Plays ==
Some famous Huaguxi plays are 'Liu Hai Kan Qiao', 'Da Tong Luo', and 'Bu Guo'. These plays have some straightforward and educating themes. 'Liu Hai Kan Qiao' describes the love story of a diligent worker, expressing people's hopes for work and love. 'Da Tong luo' tells people selfishness is bad; to damage others in order to benefit oneself is immoral; to help others is to help yourself. 'Bu Guo' tells people all jobs are created equally and there shouldn't be any discrimination.

'The Revolutionary job is a whole

Just as a big machine

You're raising pigs, need me to fix the pan

To fix the pan requires iron

Iron workers are powerful

Yet they need to eat and wear clothes

Eating depends on farmers

Wearing depends on weaving cotton workers

Seventy-two professions are equally important

Complement each other, can't be separated.'

--- Bu Guo
