= Daping, Shaoshan =

Daping Township
- Township

Chinese transcription(s)
  - Simplified: 大坪乡
  - Traditional: 大坪鄉
  - Pinyin: Dàpíng Xiāng
- Location in Hunan
- Coordinates: 27°54′11″N 112°25′55″E
- Country: People's Republic of China
- Province: Hunan
- City: Xiangtan
- County-level city: Shaoshan

Area
  - Total: 32 km^{2} (12 sq mi)

Population
  - Total: 14,300
  - Density: 450/km^{2} (1,200/sq mi)
- Time zone: UTC+8 (China Standard)
- Postal code: 411300
- Area code: 0732

Daping Township (simplified Chinese: 大坪乡; traditional Chinese: 大坪鄉; pinyin: Dàpíng Xiāng) is a rural township in Shaoshan City, Xiangtan City, Hunan Province, China. It borders Shaoshan Township to the east, Shatian Township and Longdong Township to the south, Baitian Town to the west, and Jinshi Township and Longtan Township to the north. As of the 2000 census it had a population of 14,300 and an area of 32 square kilometres (12 sq mi).

== Administrative division ==
The township is divided into nine villages: Xiangshao Village (湘韶村), Shaoxin Village (韶新村), Shaofeng Village (韶峰村), Huangtian Village (黄田村), Meihua Village (梅花村), Linjiawan Village (林家湾村), Xinlian Village (新联村), Daping Village (大坪村), and Zhuzan Village (竹赞村).

== Economy ==
Rice, sweet potato, pig, and soybean are important to the economy.

== Education ==
There are seven primary schools and one public junior high school in the town.

== Gallery ==
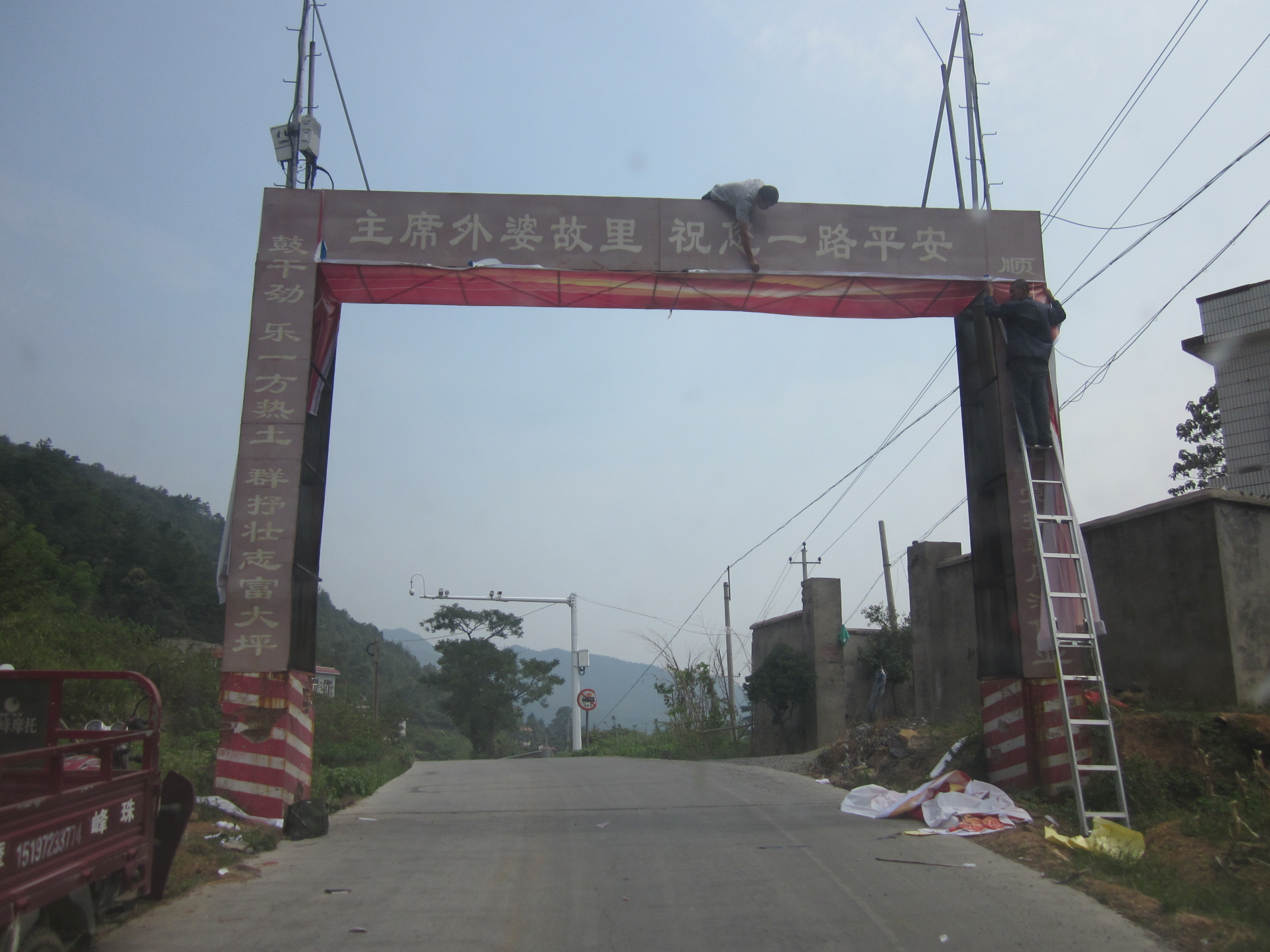
Daping, Shaoshan.

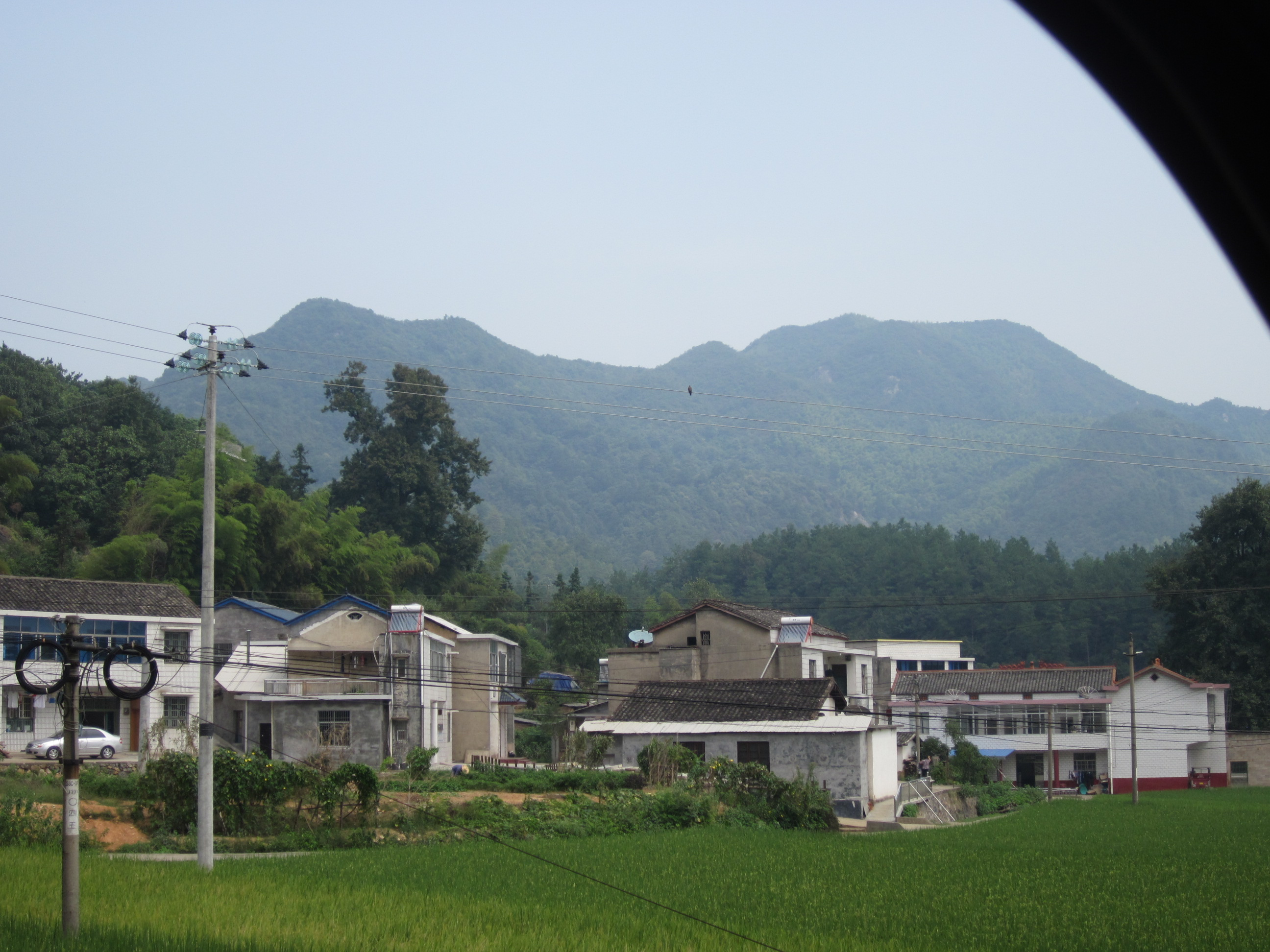
Daping, Shaoshan.

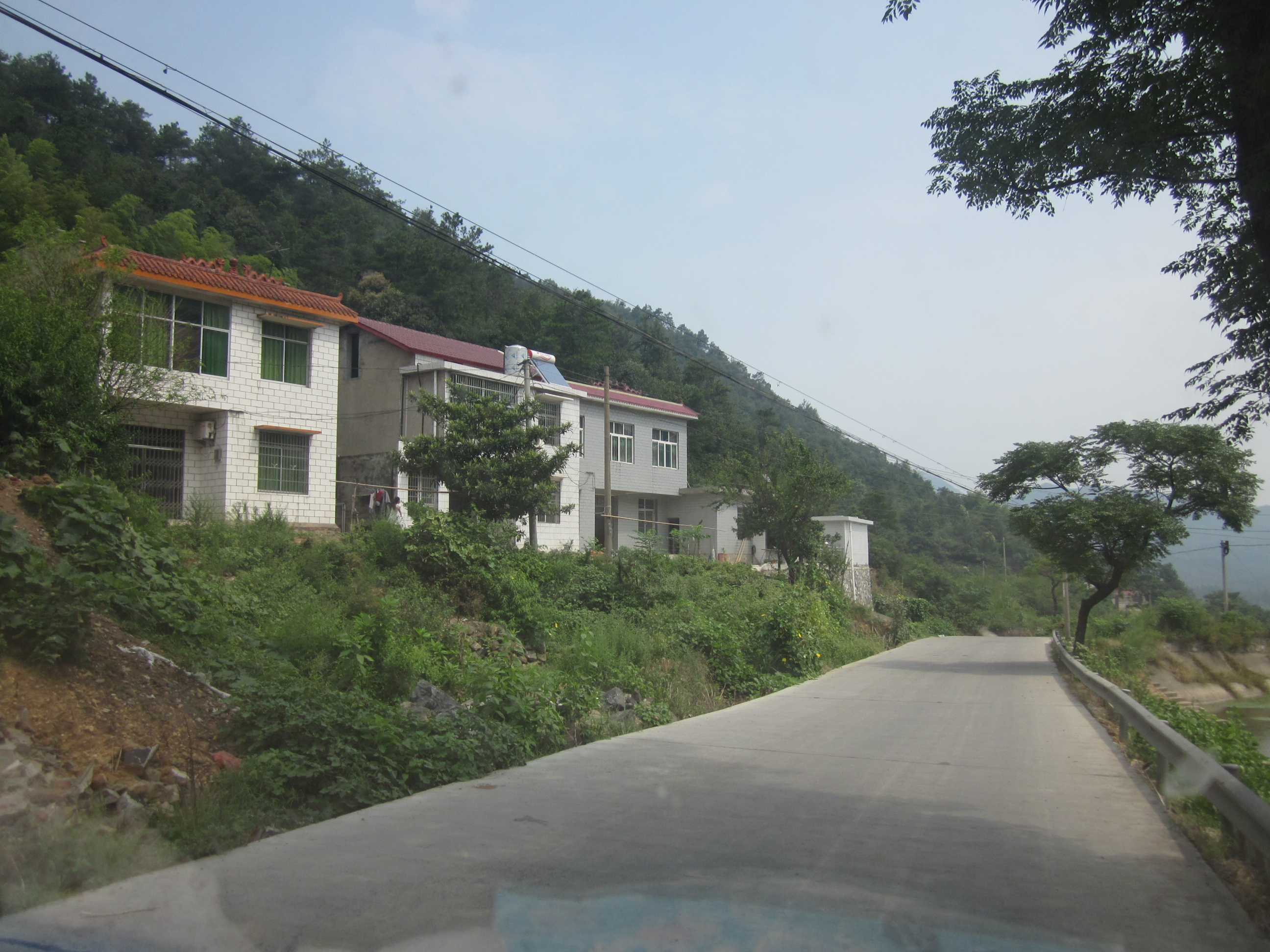
Daping, Shaoshan.

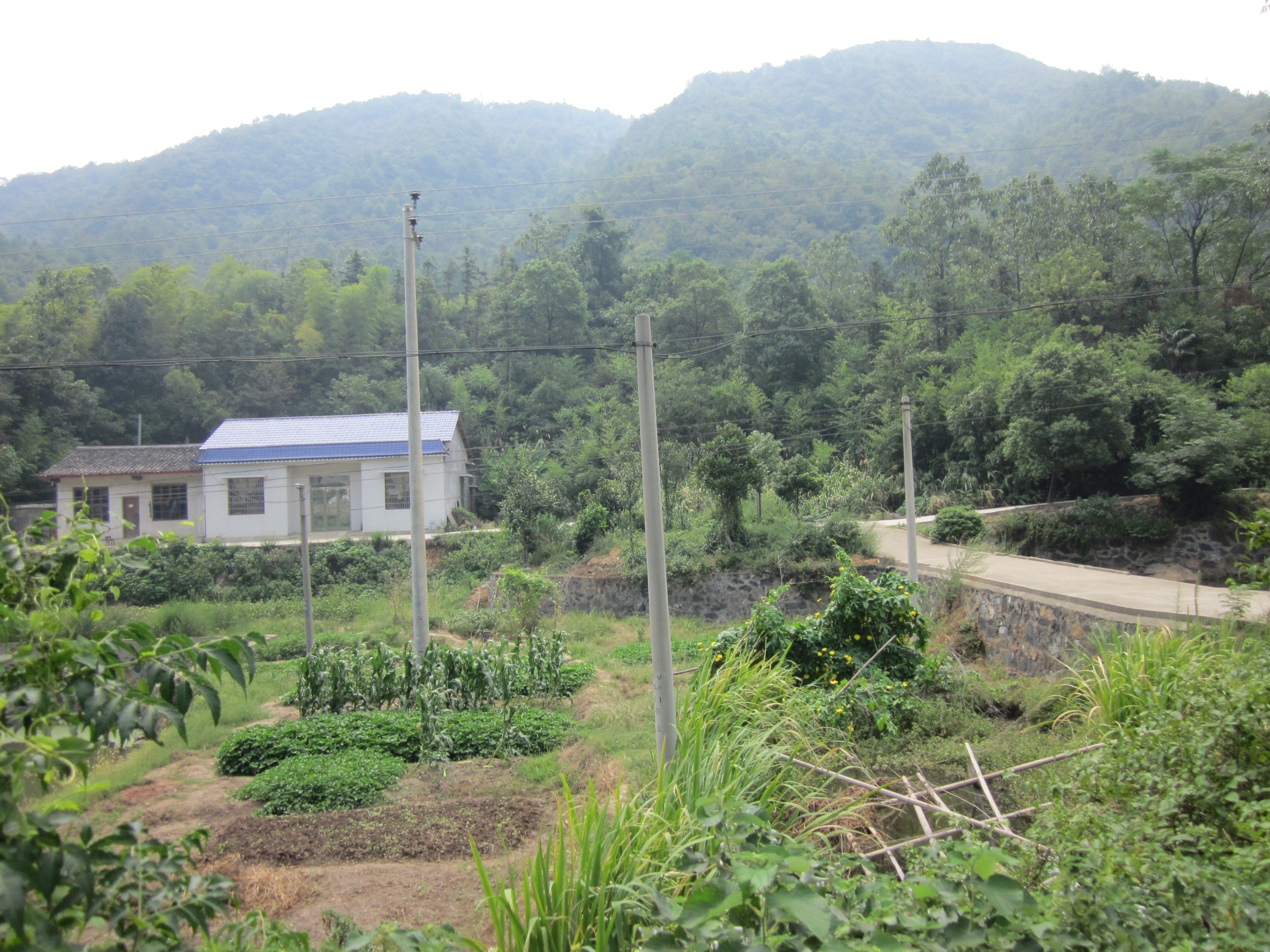
Daping, Shaoshan.
