= Qingnian Reservoir (Shaoshan) =

- 青年水库 (Chinese)
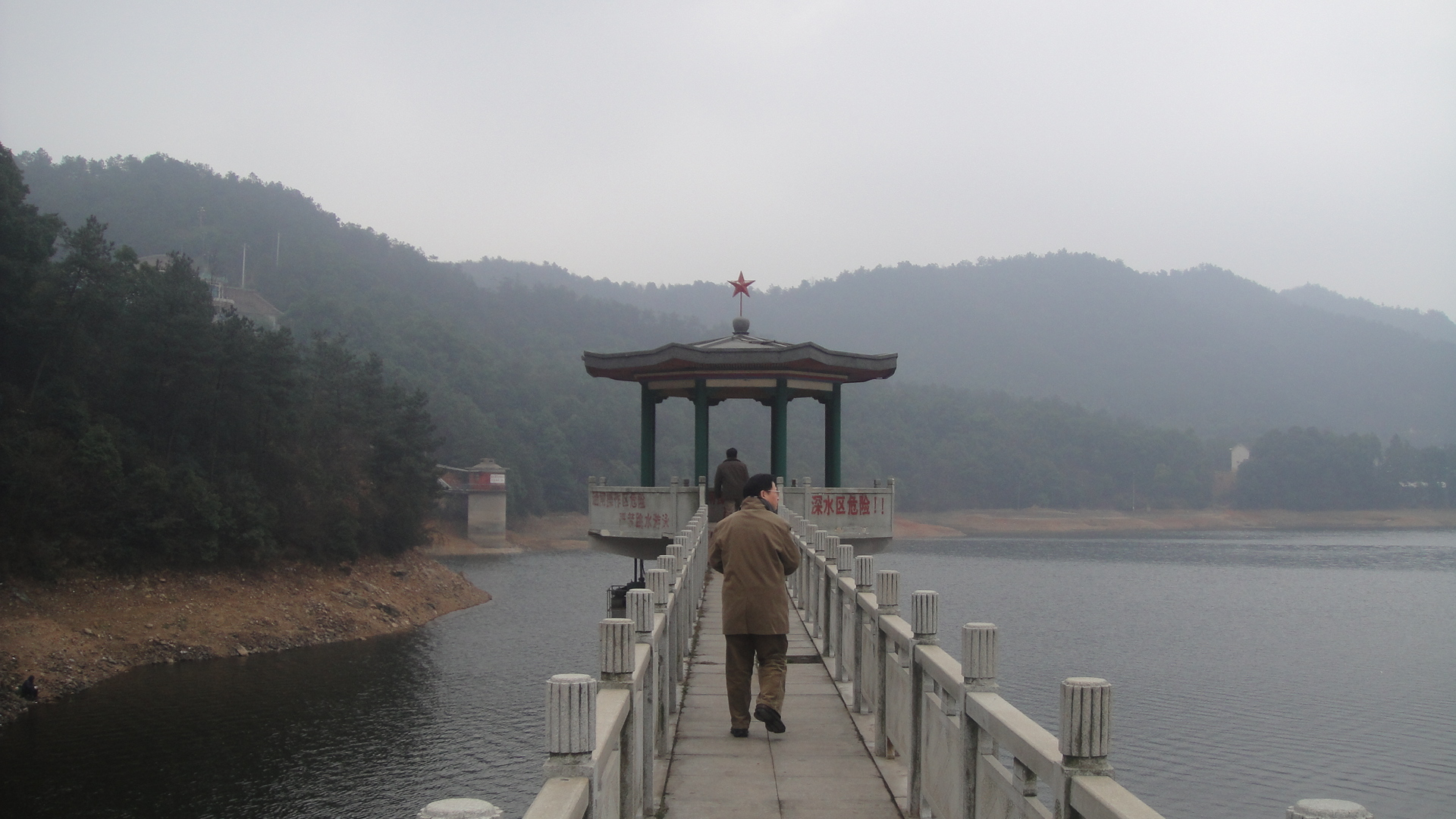
- Qingnian Reservoir

- Location in Hunan
- Location: Qingxi, Shaoshan, Hunan, China
- Coordinates: 27°56′02″N 112°31′08″E
- Type: Reservoir
- Built: 1958
- First flooded: 1960s
- Surface area: 0.5 square kilometres (120 acres)
- Max. depth: 20.5 m (67 ft)
- Water volume: 600 m^{3} (1.4×10^{−7} cu mi)

Qingnian Reservoir (simplified Chinese: 青年水库; traditional Chinese: 青年水庫; pinyin: Qīngnián Shuǐkù; lit. 'Youth Reservoir' is a reservoir located in the town of Qingxi, Shaoshan, Hunan, China. Its drainage basin is about 0.5 km^{2} (0.19 sq mi), and it can hold up to 600 m^{3} (1.4×10^{−7} cu mi) of water at full capacity.

== Etymology ==
The main builder of the reservoir is the hot-blooded youth of Shaoshan, so it is named "Qingnian Reservoir" (literally Youth Reservoir).

The reservoir provides drinking water and water for irrigation, and has also become a place for recreation for nearby residents and tourists.

== History ==
Construction of the reservoir began on 28 October 1958 and was completed in a few years.

In 2009, it was listed among the ninth group "National Water Conservancy Scenic Area" by the Ministry of Water Resources of the People's Republic of China.
