= Shaoshan Township =

Shaoshan Township 韶山乡
- Township
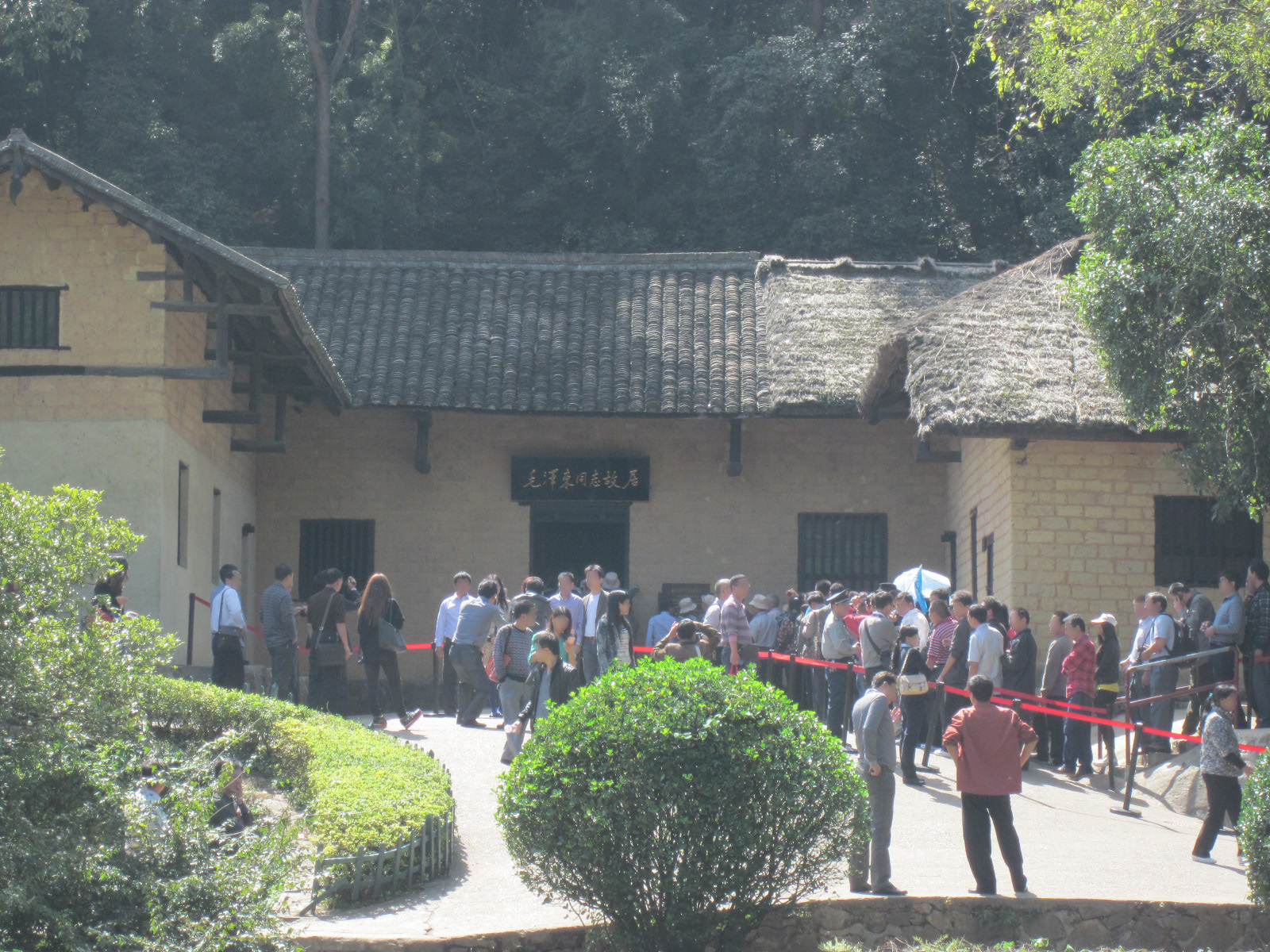

- Location in Hunan
- Coordinates: 27°54′29″N 112°29′12″E
- Country: People's Republic of China
- Province: Hunan
- Prefecture-level city: Xiangtan
- County-level city: Shaoshan

Area
  - Total: 85.2 km^{2} (32.9 sq mi)

Population
  - Total: 34,400
  - Density: 404/km^{2} (1,050/sq mi)
- Time zone: UTC+8 (China Standard)
- Postal code: 411300
- Area code: 0732

Shaoshan Township (simplified Chinese: 韶山乡; traditional Chinese: 韶山鄉; pinyin: Sháoshān Xiāng) is a rural township in Shaoshan City, Hunan Province, China. It is surrounded by Ruyi Town on the northeast, Longdong Township on the south, and Daping Township and Yanglin Township on the west. As of the 2015 census it had a population of 34,400 and an area of 85.2 square kilometres (32.9 sq mi).

== History ==
In 2015, Daping Township was merged into Shaoshan Township.

== Administrative division ==
The township is divided into 21 villages:

- Shaoshan Village (韶山村)
- Shaoyuan Village (韶源村)
- Shaobei Village (韶北村)
- Tiepi Village (铁皮村)
- Shaoguang Village (韶光村)
- Zhuji Village (竹鸡村)
- Guyang Village (谷阳村)
- Shitang Village (石塘村)
- Huaqiao Village (花桥村)
- Shaoxi Village (韶西村)
- Shaodong Village (韶东村)
- Chengqian Village (城前村)
- Xinhu Village (新湖村)
- Xiangshao Village (湘韶村)
- Shaoxin Village (韶新村)
- Huangtian Village (黄田村)
- Shaofeng Village (韶峰村)
- Meihua Village (梅花村)
- Linjiawan Village (林家湾村)
- Daping Village (大坪村)
- Xinlian Village (新联村)

== Education ==
There are two junior high schools and three primary schools located with the town.

== Attractions ==
Former Residence of Mao Zedong and Dishui Hole (滴水洞) are famous scenic spots.

== Gallery ==
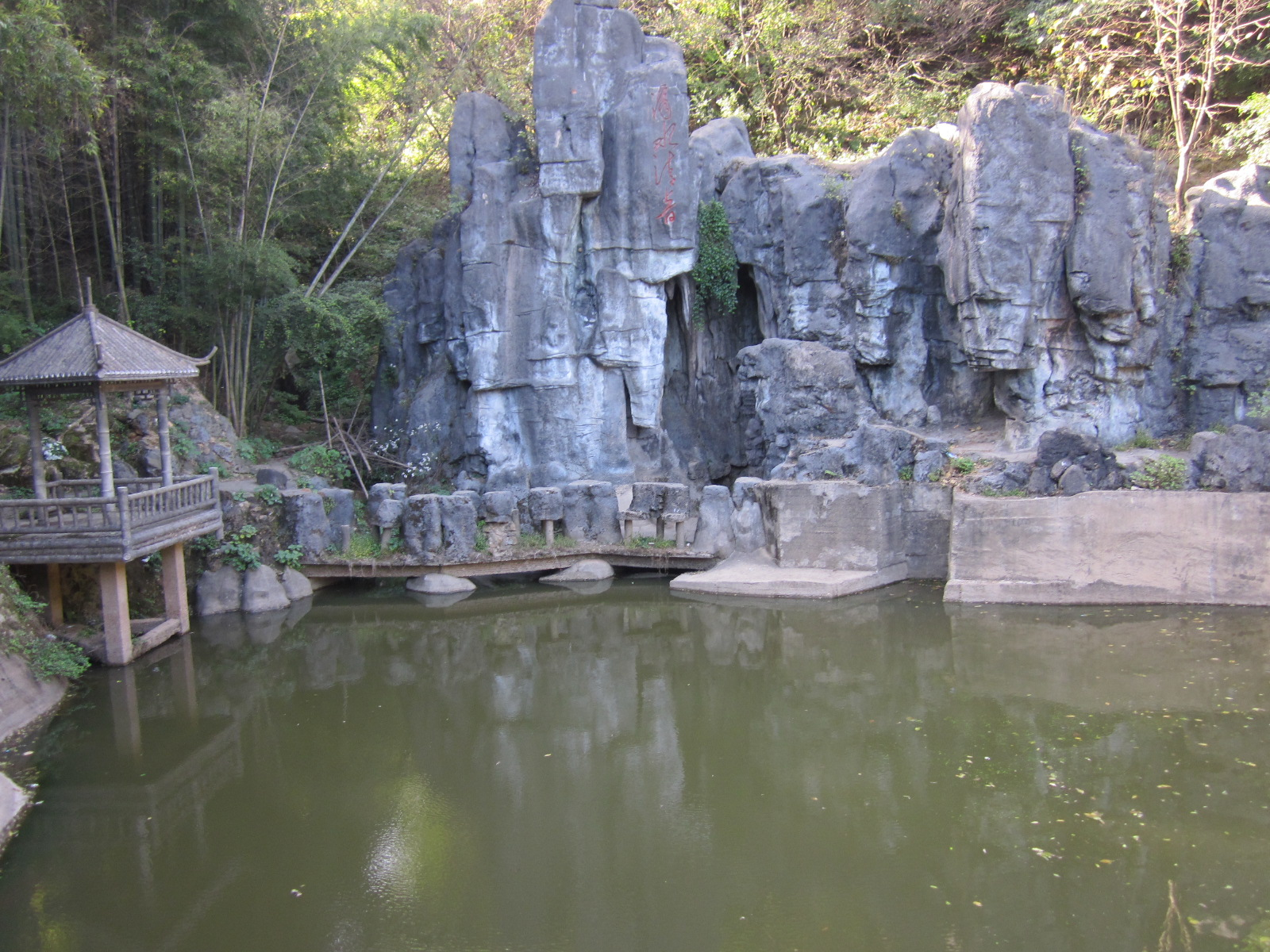
Dishui Cave.

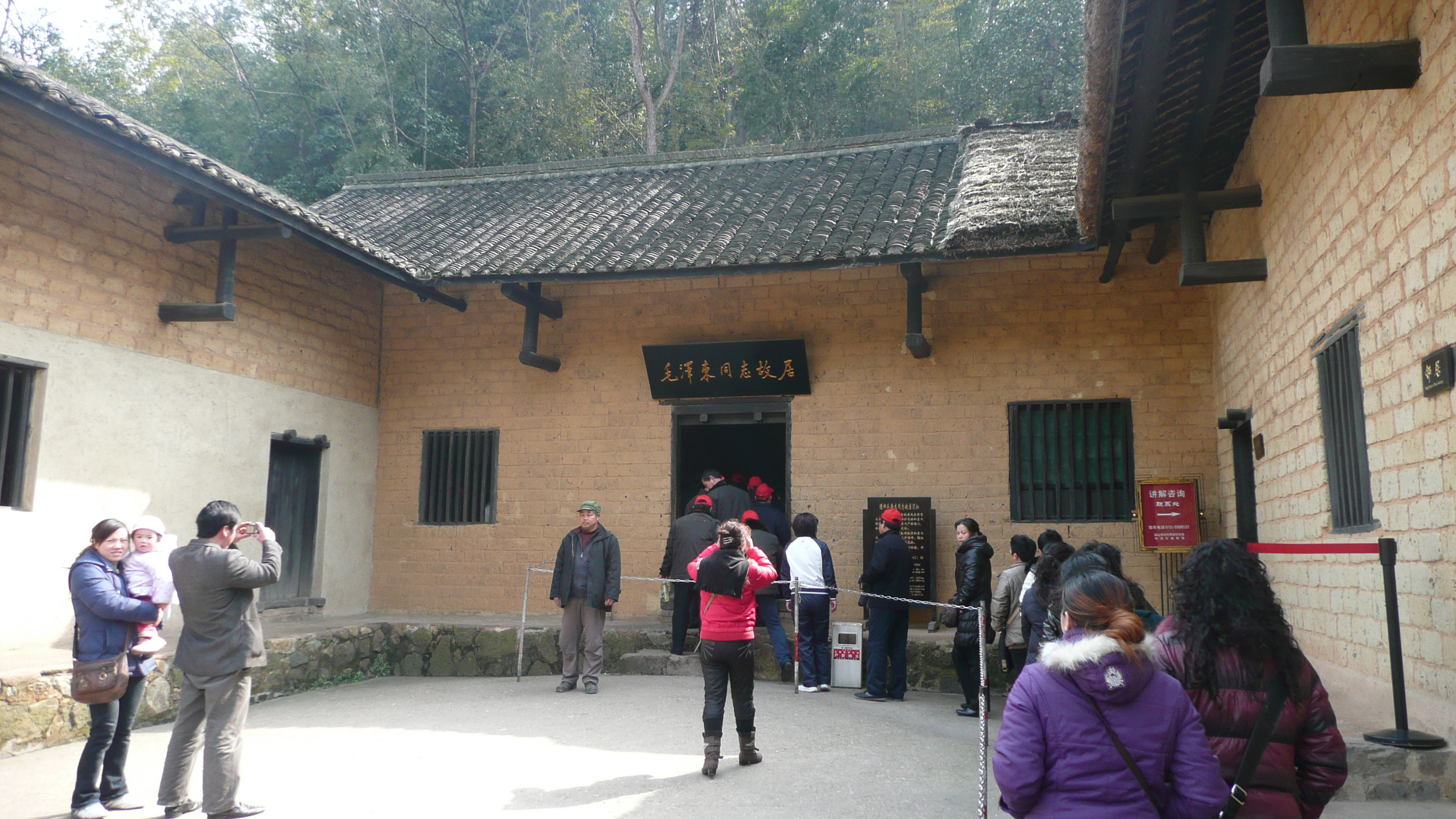
Former Residence of Mao Zedong.

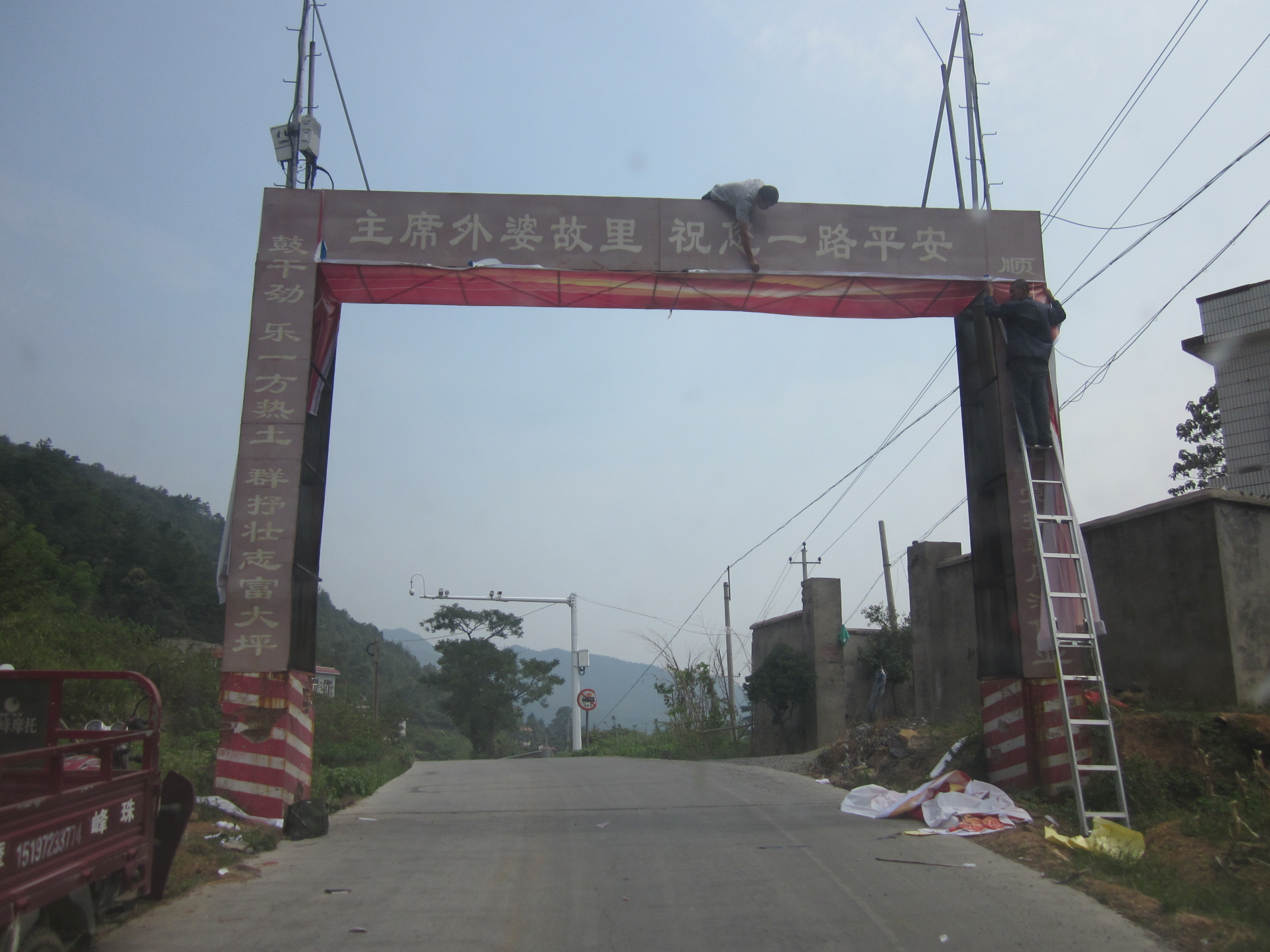
Rural scenery in former Daping Township (now Shaoshan Township).

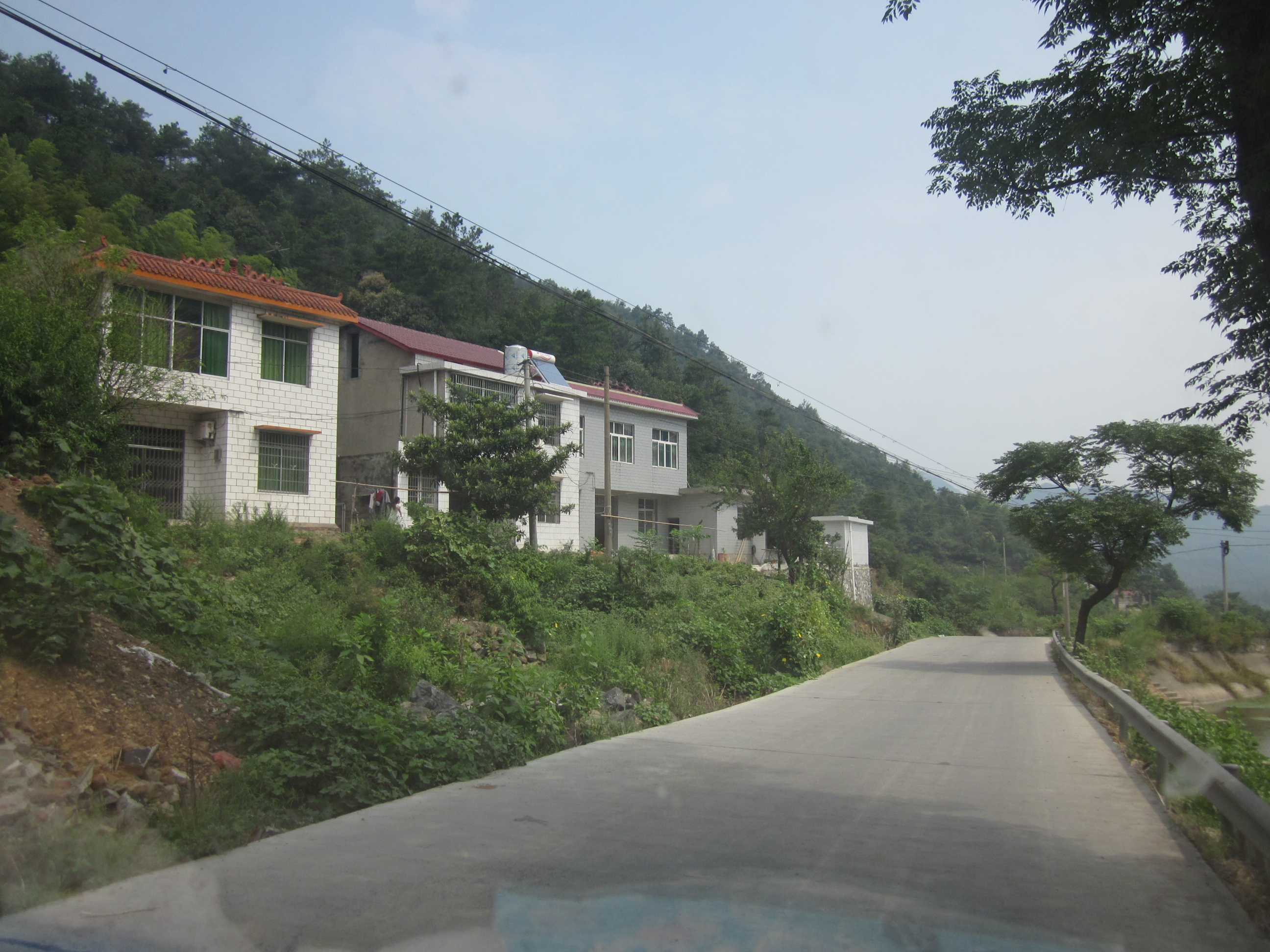
Rural scenery in former Daping Township (now Shaoshan Township).

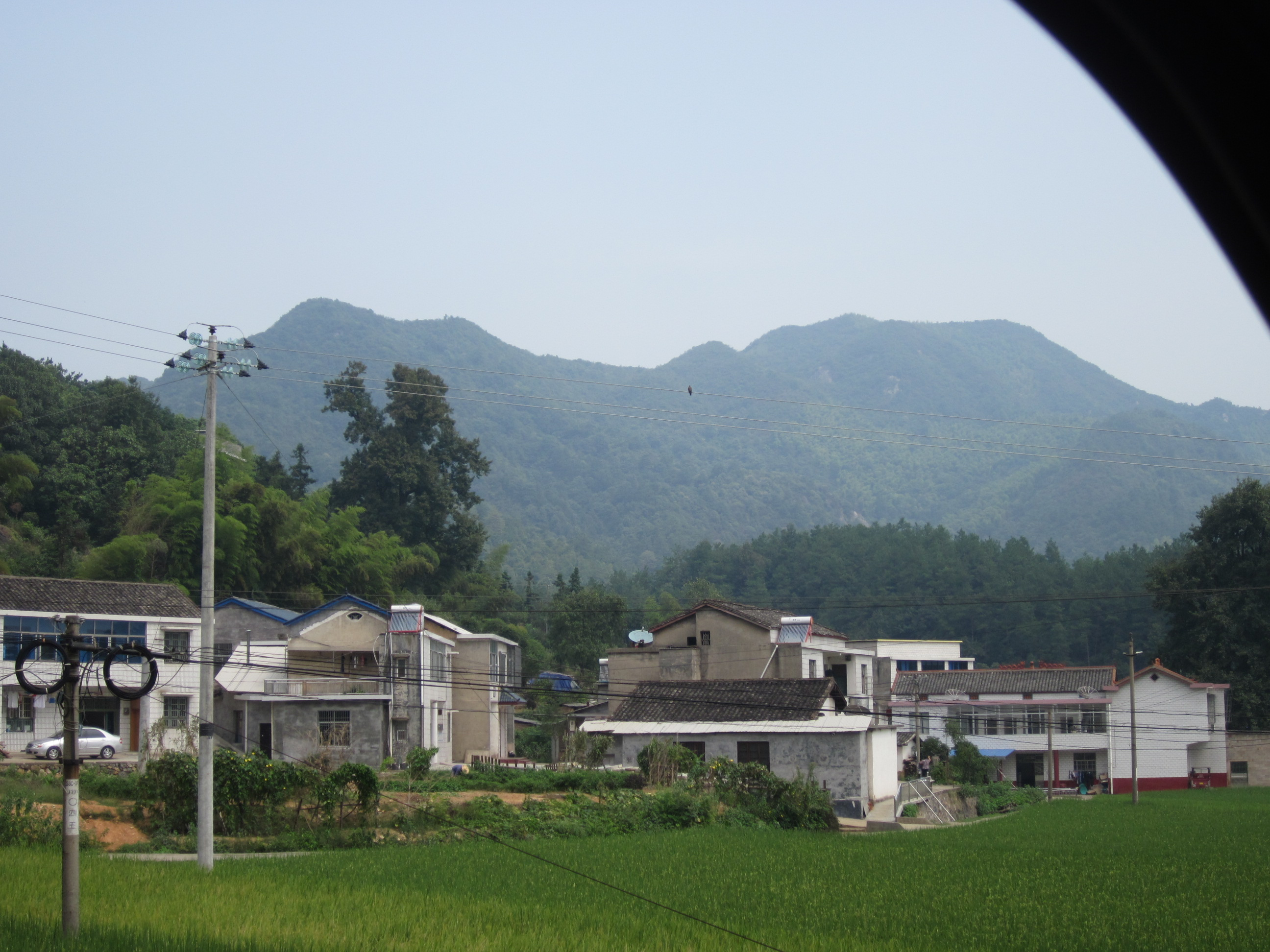
Rural scenery in former Daping Township (now Shaoshan Township).

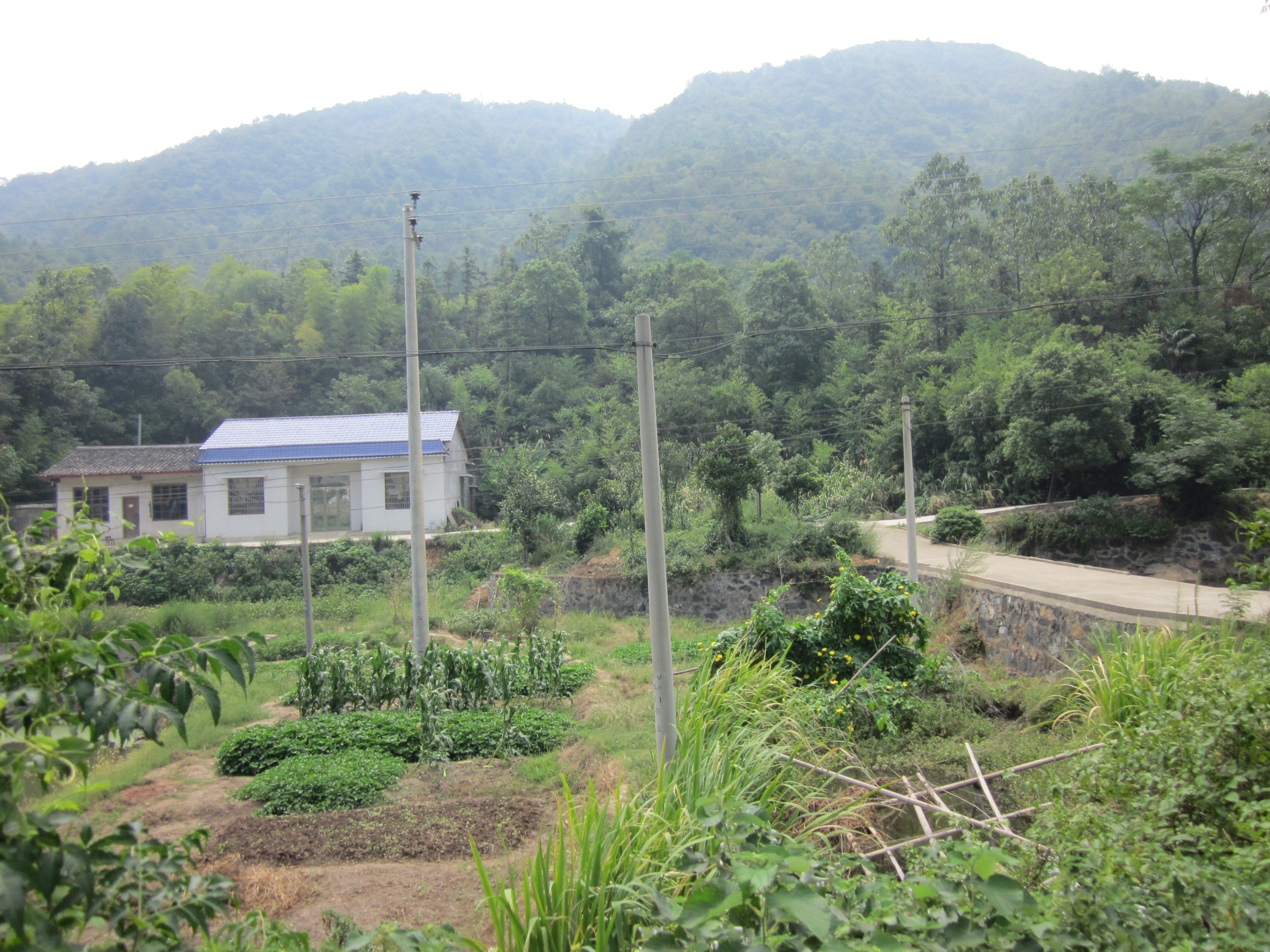
Rural scenery in former Daping Township (now Shaoshan Township).
