= Beitian =

Beitian may refer to:

- Beitian (Kangju), the summer capital of the ancient Kangju kingdom of Central Asia
- Beitian, Shanxi, a subdistrict of Yuci District, Shanxi, China
- Beitian Township, a township in Dingxing County, Hebei, China

== See also ==
- Baitian, Xiangxiang
