= Yintian, Shaoshan =

Yintian Town 银田镇
- Town
- Location in Hunan
- Coordinates: 27°53′02″N 112°36′27″E
- Country: People's Republic of China
- Province: Hunan
- Prefecture-level city: Xiangtan
- County-level city: Shaoshan

Area
  - Total: 28 km^{2} (11 sq mi)

Population
  - Total: 19,500
  - Density: 700/km^{2} (1,800/sq mi)
- Time zone: UTC+8 (China Standard)
- Postal code: 411300
- Area code: 0732

Yintian Town (simplified Chinese: 银田镇; traditional Chinese: 銀田鎮; pinyin: Yíntián Zhèn) is a rural town in Shaoshan City, Xiangtan City, Hunan Province, China. As of the 2000 census it had a population of 19,560 and an area of 28 square kilometres (11 sq mi).

== Administrative division ==
The town is divided into eleven villages and a community: Yintianzhen Community (银田镇社区), Qingshi Village (青石村), South Village (南村), Chayuan Village (茶园村), Aoshi Village (鳌石村), Fengjia Village (凤家村), Changtian Village (长田村), Nanhu Village (南湖村), Sanhua Village (三华村), Xifeng Village (夕丰村), Beituo Village (北托村), and Huaixing Village (槐星村).

== Geography ==
The Longgu Mountain (龙骨岭) is a scenic spot in the town. The highest point of the mountain measures 158.2 metres (519 ft) in height.

== Economy ==
The region abounds with coal, limestone, and sepiolite.

== Transportation ==
=== Expressway ===
The Shaoshan Expressway, which runs east through to Nanzhushan Town of Xiangtan County and the west through Qingxi Town to Ningxiang. Its eastern terminus is at G60 Shanghai–Kunming Expressway and its northern terminus is at Changsha-Shaoshan-Loudi Expressway.

=== Provincial Highway ===
The S208 Provincial Highway (S208省道) runs through the town.

=== Railway ===
The Shaoshan railway, from Xiangshao station of Xiangtan County to Shaoshan station in the town.

== Attractions ==
Yintian Temple (银田寺), built in 1459, in the third year of the age of Tianshun of Emperor Yingzong, is a Buddhist temple and scenic spot.
