= Qingxi, Shaoshan =

Qingxi Town 清溪镇
- Town
- Location in Hunan
- Coordinates: 27°55′39″N 112°31′05″E
- Country: People's Republic of China
- Province: Hunan
- Prefecture-level city: Xiangtan
- County-level city: Shaoshan

Area
  - Total: 71.16 km^{2} (27.48 sq mi)

Population (2015)
  - Total: 48,500
  - Density: 682/km^{2} (1,770/sq mi)
- Time zone: UTC+8 (China Standard)
- Postal code: 411300
- Area code: 0732

Qingxi Town (simplified Chinese: 清溪镇; traditional Chinese: 清溪鎮; pinyin: Qīngxī Zhèn) is an urban town in and subdivision of Shaoshan, Hunan Province, China. As of the 2015 census it had a population of 48,500 and an area of 71.16 square kilometres (27.48 sq mi).

== History ==
In 2015, Ruyi Town and Yongyi Township were merged into Qingxi Town.

== Administrative division ==
The town is divided into 18 villages and 4 communities:

- Shaoshao Railway Station Community (韶山火车站社区)
- Zhuji Community (竹鸡社区)
- Ruyiting Community (如意亭社区)
- Shaoshanchong Community (韶山冲社区)
- Qingxi Village (清溪村)
- Shizhong Village (石忠村)
- Shishan Village (石山村)
- Huayuan Village (花园村)
- Chaoyang Village (朝阳村)
- Yangjia Village (杨佳村)
- Yangrong Village (杨荣村)
- Qiushan Village (球山村)
- Ruyi Village (如意村)
- Meihu Village (梅湖村)
- Houluo Village (厚罗村)
- Shihu Village (石湖村)
- Shaonan Village (韶南村)
- Yongquan Village (永泉村)
- Yongyi Village (永义村)
- Shishan Village (狮山村)
- Changhu Village (长湖村)
- Donghu Village (东湖村)

== Transportation ==
=== Expressway ===
The Shaoshan Expressway, which runs east through Yintian Town to Nanzhushan Town of Xiangtan County and the north through Huaminglou Town to Ningxiang. Its eastern terminus is at G60 Shanghai–Kunming Expressway and its northern terminus is at Changsha-Shaoshan-Loudi Expressway.

=== Provincial Highway ===
The S208 Provincial Highway runs east through Yintian Town to Nanzhushan Town of Xiangtan County and the north through Donghutang Town to Ningxiang.

=== Railway ===
The Shaoshan railway, from Xiangshao station of Xiangtan County to Shaoshan station in the town.

== Religion ==
Huguo Temple (护国禅寺) is a Buddhist temple on the town.

== Celebrity ==
- Huang Zushi, a major general in the People's Liberation Army.
- Liu Keqiang, revolutionist.
- He Haiqing, a general of the Republic of China Army.
