= Streptomyces rubidus =

Scientific classification
- Domain: Bacteria
- Kingdom: Bacillati
- Phylum: Actinomycetota
- Class: Actinomycetes
- Order: Streptomycetales
- Family: Streptomycetaceae
- Genus: Streptomyces
- Species: S. rubidus

Binomial name
- Streptomyces rubidus Xu et al. 2006

Type strain
- 13c15, CGMCC 4.2026, CIP 109249, JCM 13277, NBRC 102073

Species of bacterium

Streptomyces rubidus is an acidophilic bacterium species from the genus of Streptomyces which has been isolated from soil from a pine forest in Yanglin in the Yunnan province in China.

== See also ==
- List of Streptomyces species
