= Ruyi, Shaoshan =

Ruyi Town
- Town

Chinese transcription(s)
  - Simplified: 如意镇
  - Traditional: 如意鎮
  - Pinyin: Rúyì Zhèn
- Location in Hunan
- Coordinates: 27°55′47″N 112°33′19″E
- Country: People's Republic of China
- Province: Hunan
- City: Xiangtan
- County-level city: Shaoshan

Area
  - Total: 33.85 km^{2} (13.07 sq mi)

Population
  - Total: 15,100
  - Density: 446/km^{2} (1,160/sq mi)
- Time zone: UTC+8 (China Standard)
- Postal code: 411300
- Area code: 0732

Ruyi Town (simplified Chinese: 如意镇; traditional Chinese: 如意鎮; pinyin: Rúyì Zhèn) is an urban town in Shaoshan City, Xiangtan City, Hunan Province, China. It borders Datunying to the northeast, Shaoshan Township to the south, Yanglin Township to the west, and Yongyi Township and Yintian Town to the east. As of the 2000 census it had a population of 15,100 and an area of 33.85 square kilometres (13.07 sq mi).

== Administrative division ==
The town is divided into ten villages and a community: Ruyi Community (如意社区), Ruyi Village (如意村), Zongheyang Village (综合场村), Qiushan Village (球山村), Shihu Village (石湖村), Houluo Village (厚罗村), Meihu Village (梅湖村), Hengxin Village (恒心村), Yangyun Village (杨云村), Yangjia Village (杨佳村), and Houxin Village (厚新村).
