= Qingxi =

Qingxi may refer to the following locations in China:

== Towns ==
Written as "清溪镇":

- Qingxi, Chongqing, in Fuling District
- Qingxi, Dongguan, Guangdong
- Qingxi, Shaoshan, in Shaoshan, Hunan
