= Renhou =

Renhou may refer to:

- Gao Renhou (died 886), army general in the Chinese Tang Dynasty
- Renhou, Yuzhou District, Yulin, Guangxi, China
- Renhou, Baoding, Tang County, Hebei, China
- Renhou, Baitian, Xiangxiang, Hunan, China

== See also ==
- Renhō, Japanese politician
