= Shaoshan–Shaoshan Interchange Expressway =

Road in Hunan, China

Shaoshan–Shaoshan Interchange Expressway
- 韶山-韶山互通高速公路
- Shaoshan Expressway 韶山高速

Route information
- Length: 13.295 km (8.261 mi)
- Existed: December 24 2008–present

Location
- Country: China
- Province: Hunan

Highway system
- Transport in China

Shaoshan–Shaoshan Interchange Expressway (Chinese: 韶山-韶山互通高速公路) is a major expressway of Hunan province, China, linking the cities of Xiangtan, Shaoshan and Ningxiang. It is 13.295 kilometres (8.261 mi) in length. Construction of the expressway commenced on December 26, 2004, and was completed on December 24, 2008.

== Route ==
- Xiangtan County
- Shaoshan
- Ningxiang

== Scenic spots ==
- Former Residence of Mao Zedong
- Former Residence of Liu Shaoqi
