= Shaoshan railway =

Railway line in Hunan, China

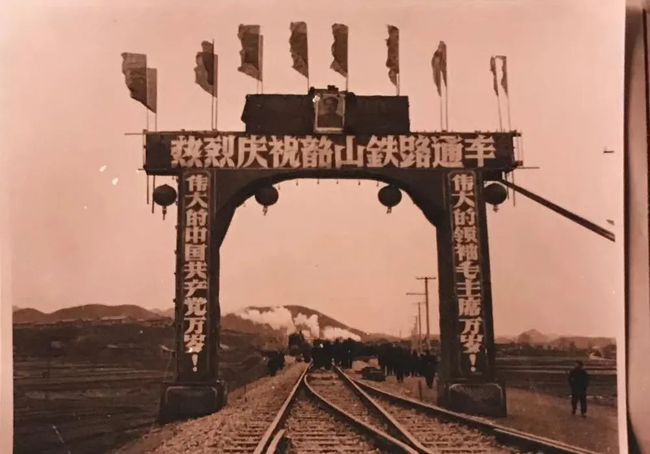
- Shaoshan railway on 28 December 1967

Overview
- Native name: 韶山铁路
- Locale: China
- Termini: Xiangshao station, Xiangtan County; Shaoshan station, Shaoshan

Service
- System: China Railway

History
- Commenced: 5 February 1967
- Opened: 28 December 1967
- Completed: December 1967

Technical
- Number of tracks: 2
- Electrification: yes

Shaoshan railway (simplified Chinese: 韶山铁路; traditional Chinese: 韶山鐵路; pinyin: Sháoshān tiělù) is a major rail corridor in Xiangtan, Hunan, China. The railway is from Xiangshao station of Xiangtan County to Shaoshan station in Qingxi Town. Its total length is 21.4-kilometre (13.3 mi). It links Hunan–Guizhou railway at Xiangshao station. The railway is under the jurisdiction of Guangzhou Railway Group (GRG).

Construction of the railway commenced on February 5, 1967 and was completed at the year's end.
