= Dishui Cave =

Cave-filled mountain in China

Coordinates: 27°55′25″N 112°28′37″E

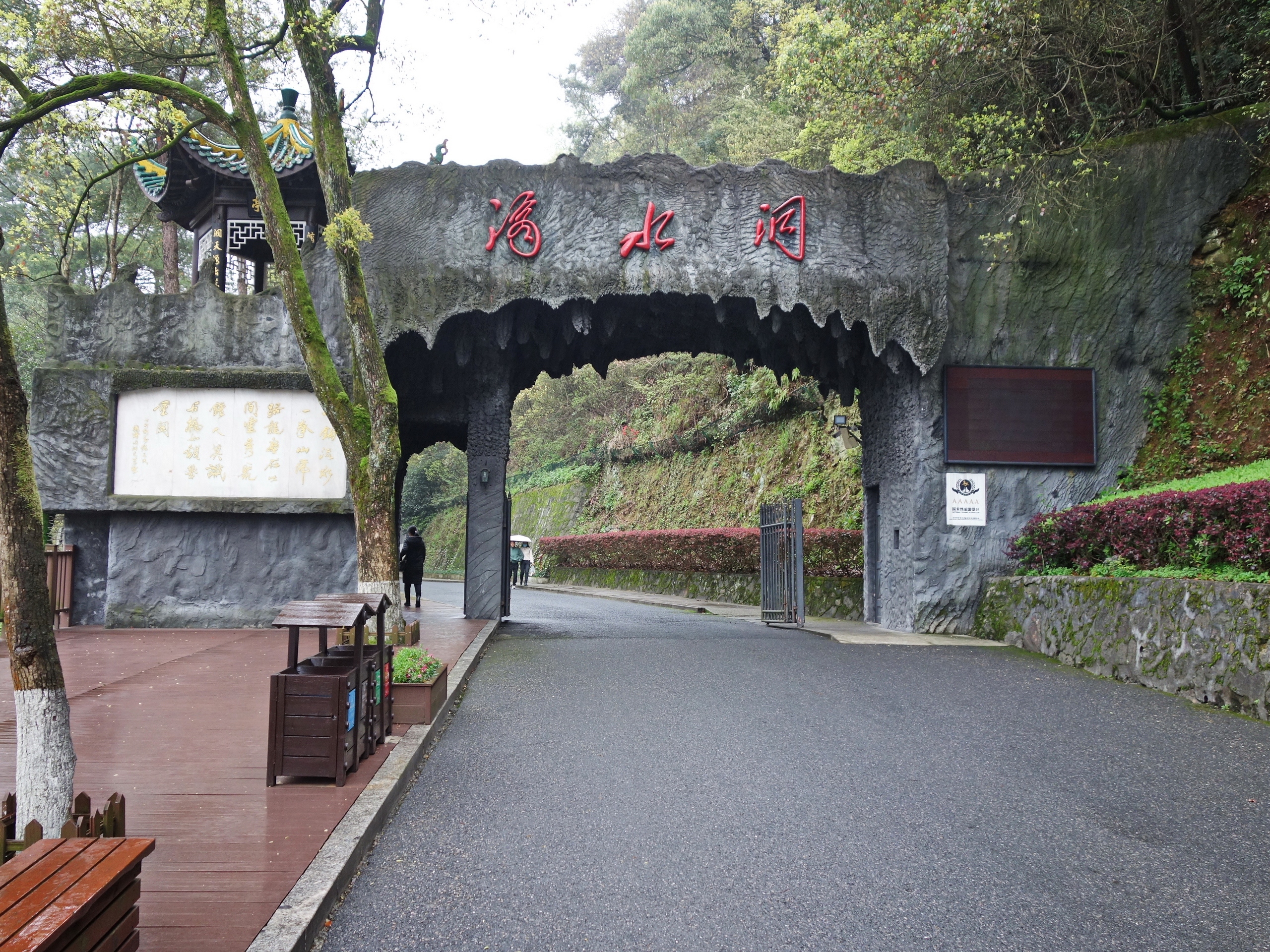

Dishui Cave (Chinese: 滴水洞; pinyin: Dīshuǐdòng; lit. 'Dripping Water Cave'), also known as Dishui Hole or Mount Dishui, is a mountain with many caves. It is regarded as a "pearl" of the landscape of Shaoshan. The mountain is the farthest end of the long valley of Shaoshan. The rocks of the valley have been worn into caves by the dripping water of a stream. The caves are close to Dishuidong Mountain, Longtoushan Mountain (龙头山) on the south, the Huxieping Mountain (虎歇坪) on the north and the Niuxingshan Mountain (牛形山) at the back. There are great varieties of rare trees and flowers, such as azalea, camellia, cymbidium, camphor, cherries, ginkgo and others which are in blossom in different seasons.

== Climate ==
Dishui Cave is in the subtropical monsoon climate zone and exhibits four distinct seasons. Its climate characterized by torrid summers, chill winters and high humidity.

== Gallery ==
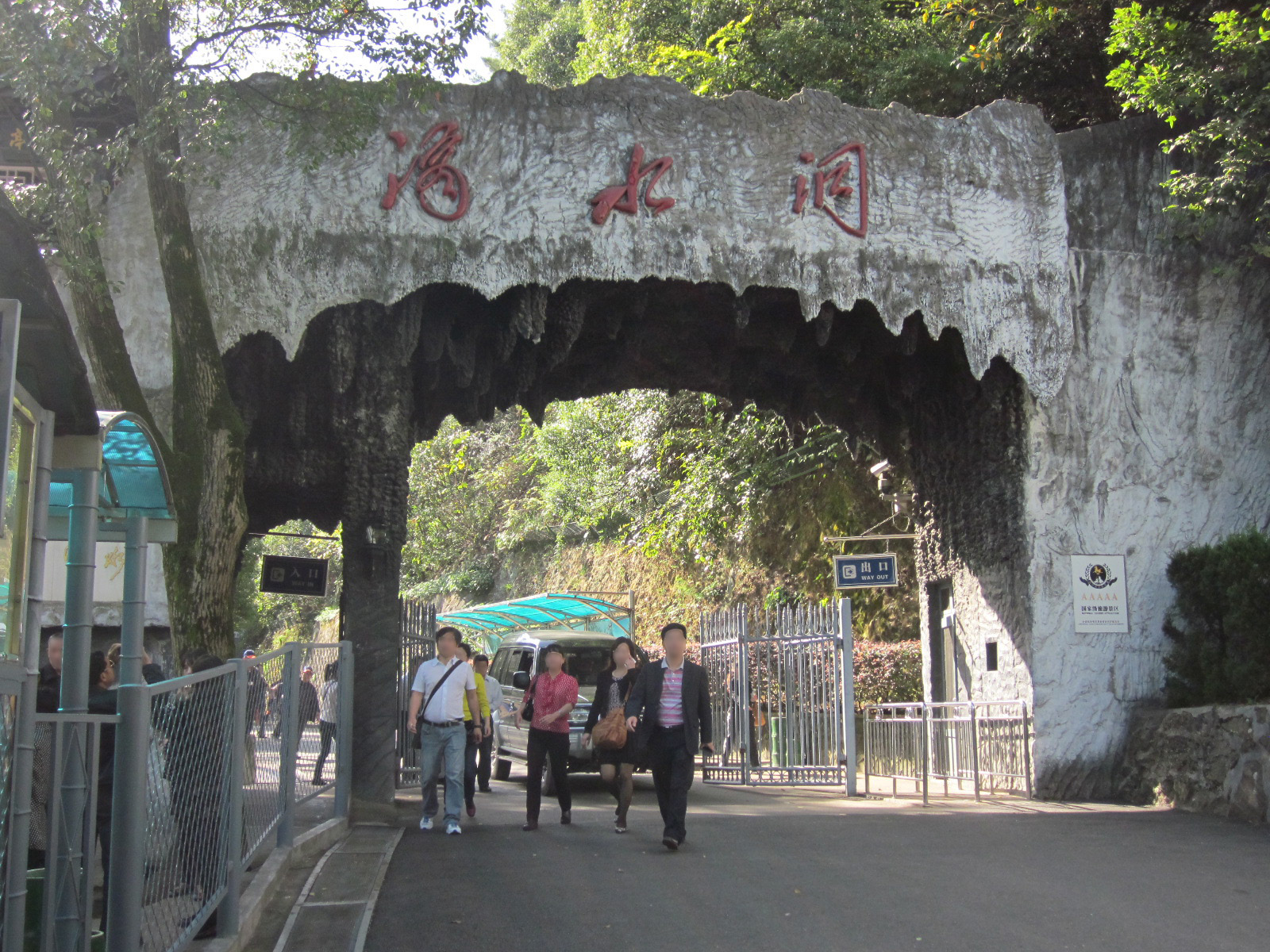
The entrance.

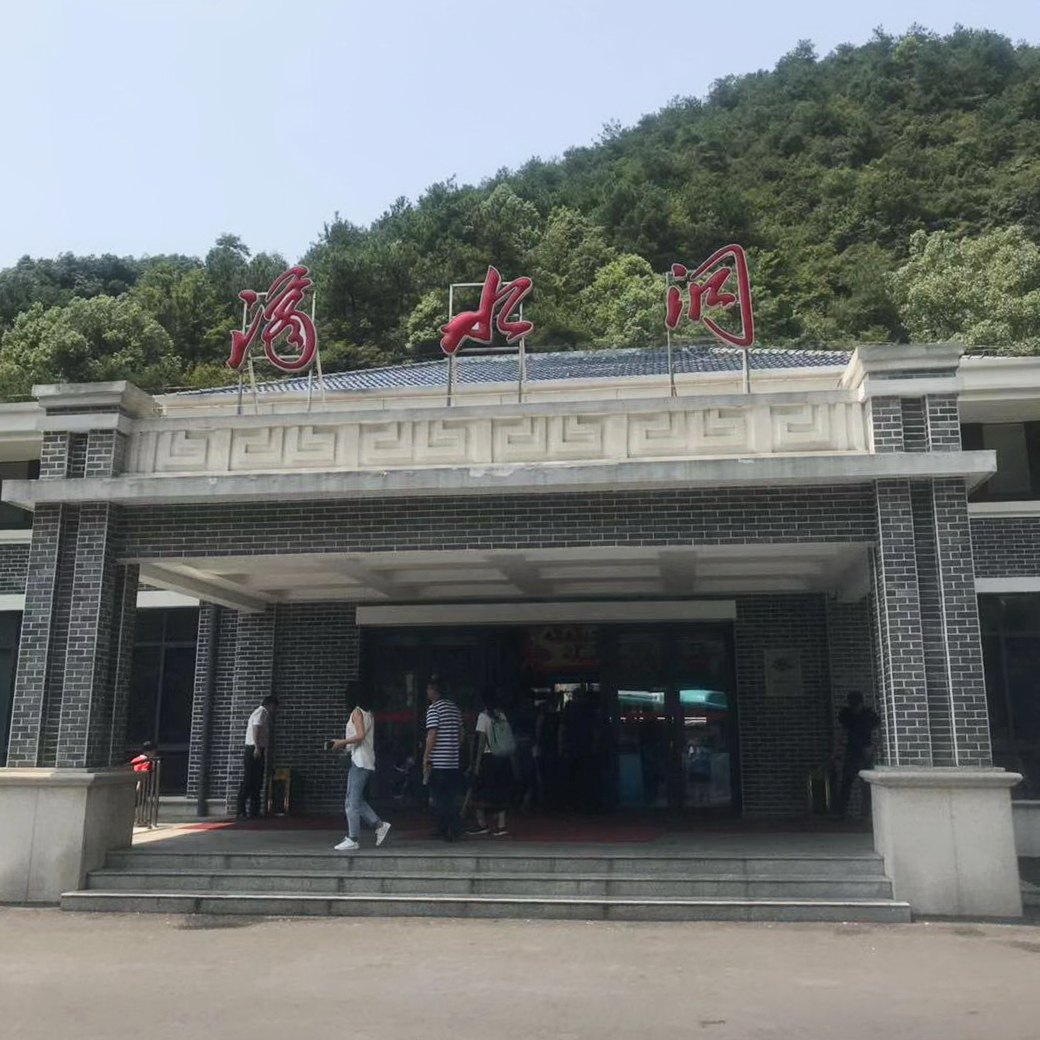

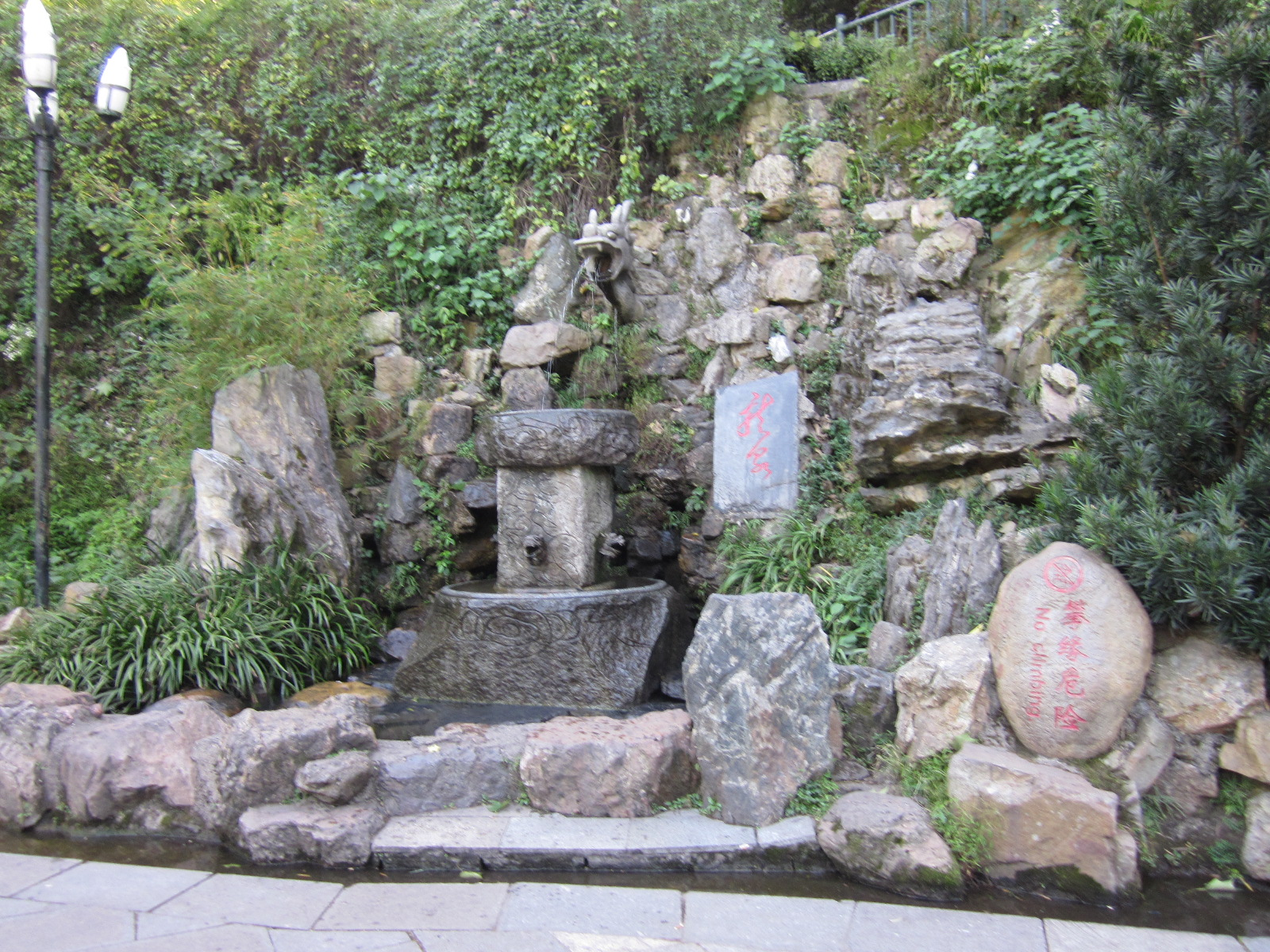

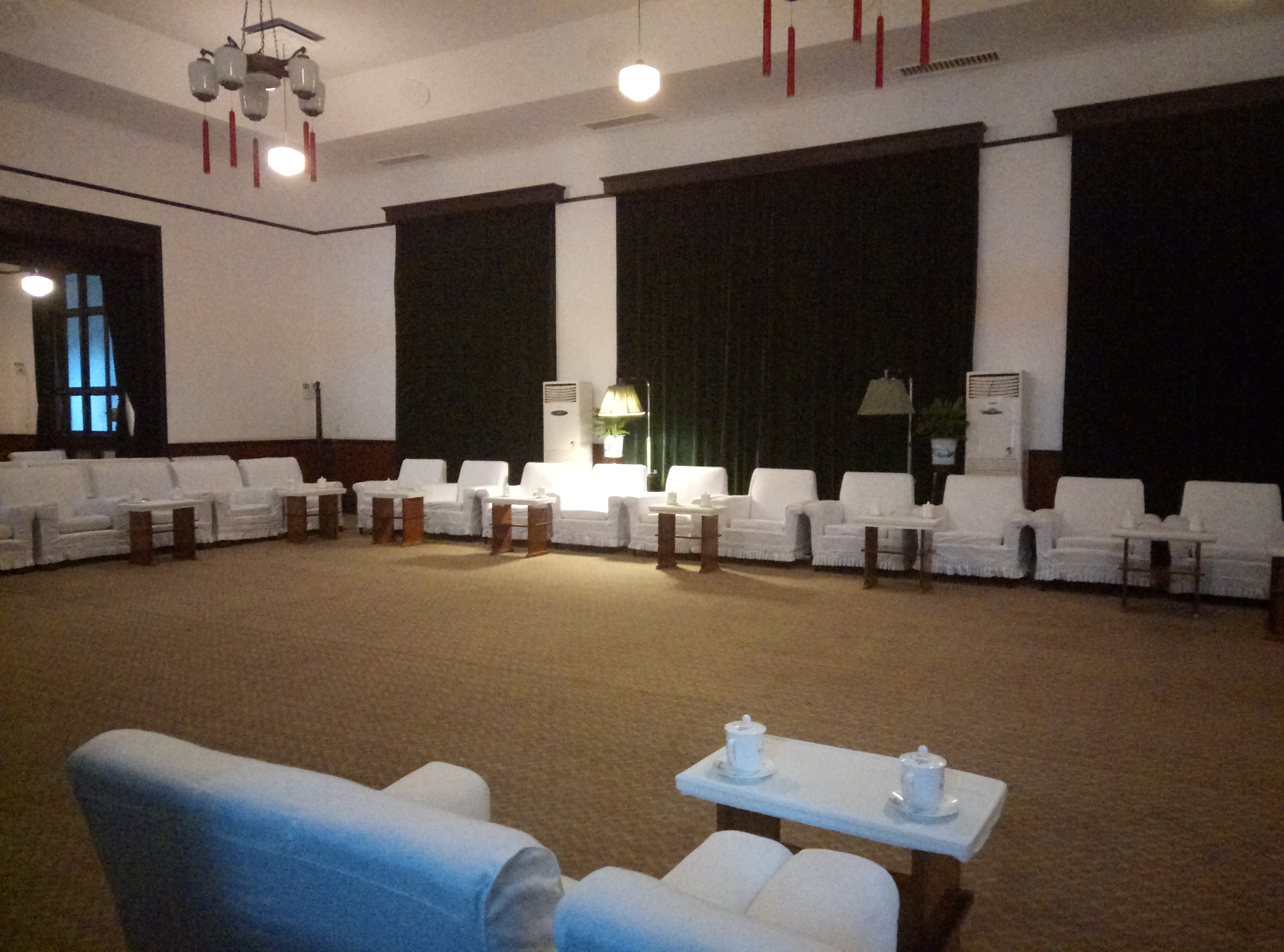
Conference Room.

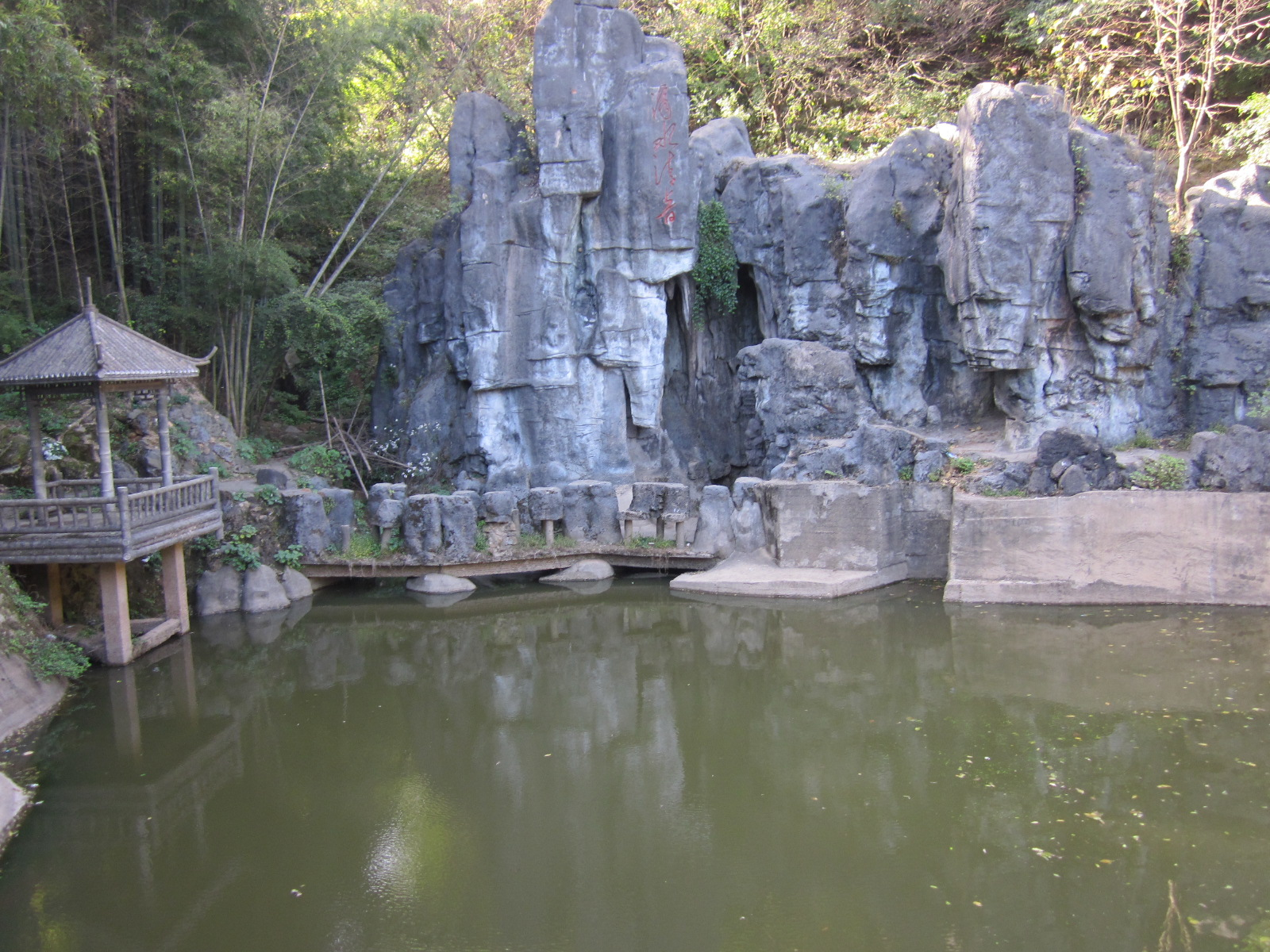
A pond.

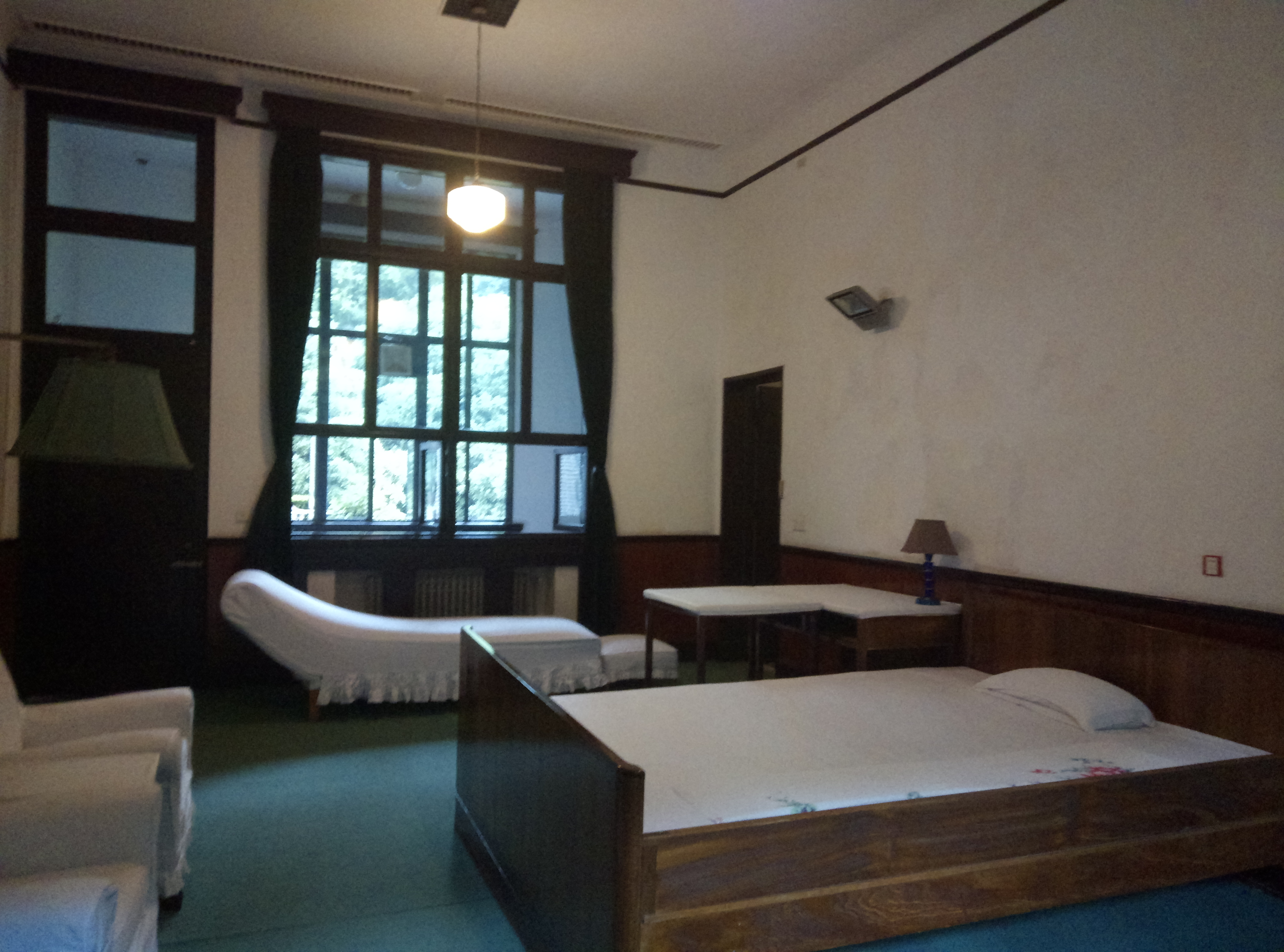
Mao's room.

== See also ==
- Mao Zedong's Former Residence
