= Yanglin, Shaoshan =

Yanglin Township 杨林乡
- Township
- Location in Hunan
- Coordinates: 27°57′23″N 112°29′35″E
- Country: People's Republic of China
- Province: Hunan
- Prefecture-level city: Xiangtan
- County-level city: Shaoshan

Area
  - Total: 58.8 km^{2} (22.7 sq mi)

Population
  - Total: 20,600
  - Density: 350/km^{2} (907/sq mi)
- Time zone: UTC+8 (China Standard)
- Postal code: 411300
- Area code: 0732

Yanglin Township (simplified Chinese: 杨林乡; traditional Chinese: 楊林鄉; pinyin: Yánglín Xiāng) is a rural township in Shaoshan City, Xiangtan City, Hunan Province, China. It borders Ruyi Town in the east, Baitian Township in the west, Shaoshan Township in the south, and Ningxiang in the north. As of the 2000 census it had a population of 20,600 and an area of 58.8 square kilometres (22.7 sq mi).

== Administrative divisions ==
The township is divided into 13 villages: Shiping Village (石屏村), Chunhe Village (纯和村), Lianghe Village (良和村), Xinxi Village (新溪村), Waping Village (瓦坪村), Lianyi Village (联邑村), Linye Village (林业村), Yanglin Village (杨林村), Shanfu Village (善扶村), Moshi Village (磨石村), Baige Village (白鸽村), Fengxing Village (凤形村), Yunyuan Village (云源村), Tuantian Village (团田村), and Shutang Village (舒塘村).

== Attractions ==
Bao'en Temple (报恩寺) is a Buddhist temple in the town.

== Celebrity ==
- Peng Shaohui, a general in the People's Liberation Army.
