= Former Residence of Mao Zedong =

Birthplace and childhood home of Mao Zedong

- 毛泽东故居
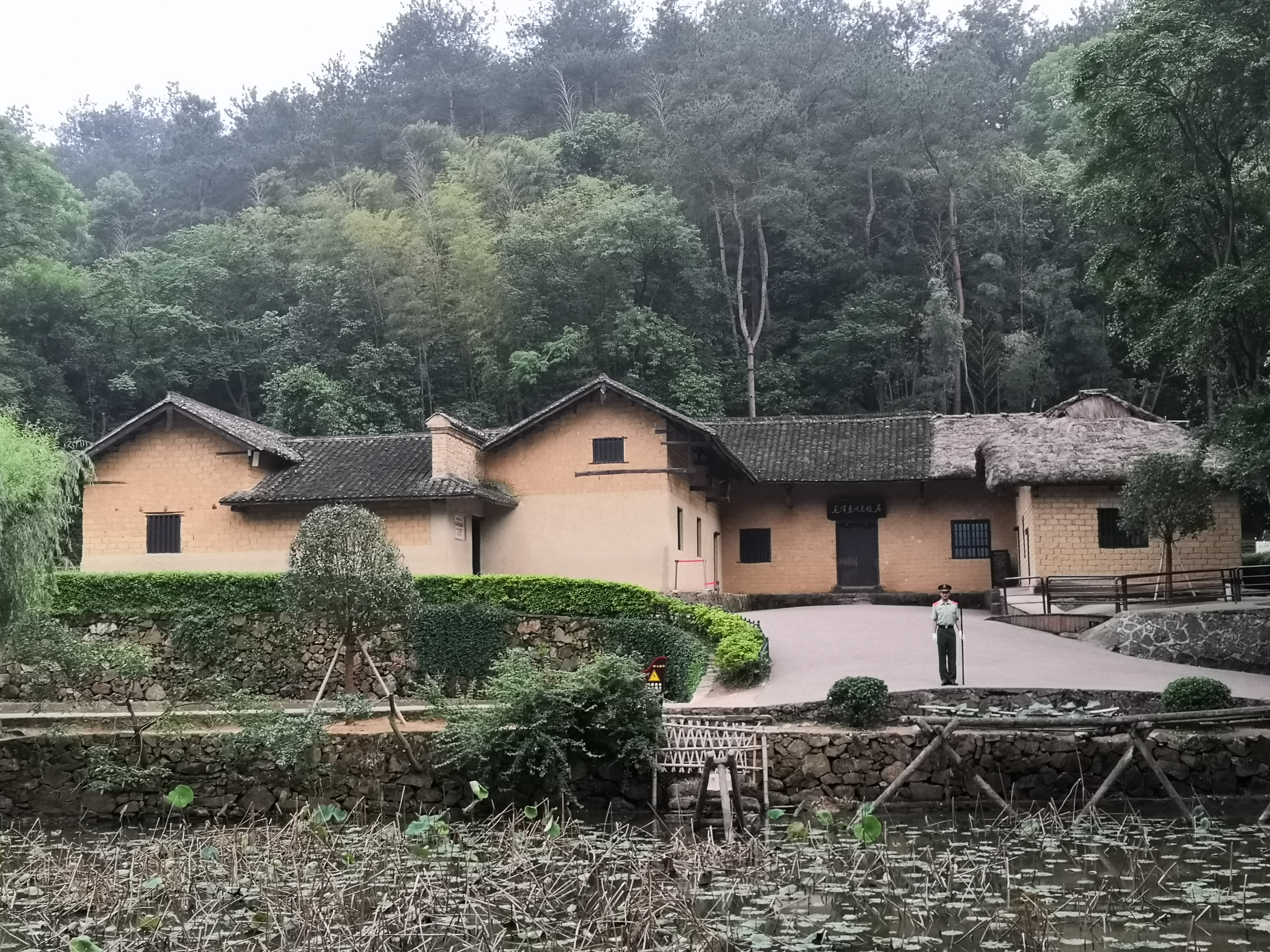
- Former Residence of Mao Zedong

- Location within Hunan Location within China

General information
- Type: Traditional folk houses
- Location: Shaoshan Township, Shaoshan, Xiangtan, Hunan, China
- Coordinates: 27°54′35″N 112°29′41″E
- Opened: 6 February 1951
- Owner: Government of Shaoshan

Technical details
- Floor area: 472.92 square metres (5,090.5 sq ft)

Former Residence of Mao Zedong or Mao Zedong's Former Residence (simplified Chinese: 毛泽东故居; traditional Chinese: 毛澤東故居; pinyin: Máo Zédōng Gùjū) was built in the late Qing dynasty (1644–1911). It is located in Shaoshan Village of Shaoshan Township in Shaoshan, Xiangtan, Hunan, China. The building was the birthplace and childhood home of Mao Zedong, the first leader of the People's Republic of China. It has a building area of about 472.92 square metres (5,090.5 sq ft), embodies buildings such as the old houses, the Mao Zedong Memorial Hall, the Bronze Statue of Mao Zedong, the Cultural relics Exhibition Hall, and the Dishui Hole (Dripping Water Cave; 滴水洞).

== History ==
Mao Zedong's grandfather built a five-and-a-half-room hut here in 1878. Mao Zedong was born here in 1893, and he lived here about 17 years before leaving for his studies. He returned home in 1912 to mobilize his relatives to join the revolution. In 1925, Mao Zedong returned to Shaoshan with his wife, Yang Kaihui, and in the name of "recuperating from an illness", he reached out to the masses to lead and carry out the peasants' movement, and set up a CCP branch in Shaoshan in the former residence, with Mao Fuxuan, Mao Zedong's close friend, as the secretary of the branch. Having led the Peasant Movement in Guangzhou, he sought to start a similar movement in Hunan. In 1927, Mao Zedong returned to Shaoshan to study the peasant movement and held a symposium for peasant cadres and the elderly at the residence. In 1929, the residence was confiscated by the Kuomintang government and destroyed.

With the founding of the People's Republic of China, in 1950, the former residence of Mao Zedong was restored in its original form. On February 6, 1951, the former residence of Mao Zedong was officially opened to the public. In 1952, the former residence of Mao Zedong was renovated. Mao again returned in 1959, eight years after the new house had been opened as a museum, and five years after it had officially been renamed Mao Zedong's Former Residence. In 1961, it was listed as a "Major Historical and Cultural Site Protected at the National Level" (全国重点文物保护单位) by the State Council of China. On June 27, 1983, Central Advisory Commission Chairman Deng Xiaoping wrote "Mao Zedong's Former Residence" on the horizontal tablet. In 1989, it was renovated. On December 20, 1993, the Communist Party general secretary Jiang Zemin attended the unveiling of the statue of Mao Zedong outside the house. In July 1997, it was listed as a National Patriotic Education Base (全国爱国主义教育基地) by the Publicity Department of the Chinese Communist Party. In December 2004, it was closed for rebuilding and repairs in 15 days.

== Exhibition ==
In the former residence, Mao's bedroom, Mao's parents' bedroom, Mao Zemin's bedroom, Mao Zetan's bedroom, the horizontal hall, the kitchen and all the rooms are restored and displayed. A large number of cultural relics are displayed in these rooms, among which the most precious relics are: bed, cabinet, folding stool, square table and wooden bamboo stool in Mao Zedong's bedroom; bed, cabinet, folding stool, desk and long sleeping chair in Mao Zedong's parents' bedroom; water tank and cupboard in the kitchen; stone mill, waterwheel and big water rake in the agricultural tools room; rice pestle and windmill in the pestle and mortar room, etc.
