= Yongyi, Shaoshan =

Yongyi Township
- Township

Chinese transcription(s)
  - Simplified: 永义乡
  - Traditional: 永義鄉
  - Pinyin: Yǒngyì Xiāng
- Location in Hunan
- Coordinates: 27°53′28″N 112°34′10″E
- Country: People's Republic of China
- Province: Hunan
- City: Xiangtan
- County-level city: Shaoshan

Area
  - Total: 24 km^{2} (9.3 sq mi)

Population
  - Total: 10,600
  - Density: 440/km^{2} (1,100/sq mi)
- Time zone: UTC+8 (China Standard)
- Postal code: 411302
- Area code: 0732

Yongyi Township (simplified Chinese: 永义乡; traditional Chinese: 永義鄉; pinyin: Yǒngyì Xiāng) is a rural township in Shaoshan City, Xiangtan City, Hunan Province, China. As of the 2000 census it had a population of 10,600 and an area of 24 square kilometres (9.3 sq mi).

== Administrative division ==
The township is divided into seven villages: Baiyu Village (白玉村), Fengmu Village (枫木村), Changhu Village (长湖村), Shaonan Village (韶南村), Yongquan Village (永泉村), Shishan Village (狮山村), and Donghu Village (东湖村).

== Economy ==
Rice, pig, black goat are important to the economy.

== Attractions ==
Huguo Temple (护国禅寺) is a Buddhist temple on the township.

== Celebrity ==
- Huang Zushi, a major general in the People's Liberation Army.
- Liu Keqiang, revolutionist.
- He Haiqing, a general of the Republic of China Army.
