= Longdong, Xiangxiang =

Longdong Town 龙洞镇
- Town
- Location in Hunan
- Coordinates: 27°50′16″N 112°30′54″E
- Country: People's Republic of China
- Province: Hunan
- Prefecture-level city: Xiangtan
- County-level city: Xiangxiang

Area
  - Total: 76.8 km^{2} (29.7 sq mi)

Population
  - Total: 29,200
  - Density: 380/km^{2} (985/sq mi)
- Time zone: UTC+8 (China Standard)
- Postal code: 411400
- Area code: 0732

Longdong Town (simplified Chinese: 龙洞镇; traditional Chinese: 龍洞鎮; pinyin: Lóngdòng Zhèn) is an urban town in Xiangxiang City, Hunan Province, People's Republic of China.

== Cityscape ==
The town is divided into 29 villages and two communities, which include the following areas: Kenzhichang Community, Tongluowan Community, Lechang Village, Jianshi Village, Quanchong Village, Shitou Village, Jiepai Village, Hemu Village, Jiantang Village, Longdong Village, Zhongchao Village, Nanxiang Village, Qixing Village, Yaohu Village, Quanhu Village, Yamiao Village, Changtai Village, Kangjia Village, Shangyi Village, Datian Village, Yinzi Village, Xiangjiang Village, Jiyi Village, and Xiaotian Village.
