= Baitian, Xiangxiang =

Baitian Town 白田镇
- Town
- Location in Hunan
- Coordinates: 27°55′24″N 112°24′15″E
- Country: People's Republic of China
- Province: Hunan
- Prefecture-level city: Xiangtan
- County-level city: Xiangxiang

Area
  - Total: 105.73 km^{2} (40.82 sq mi)

Population
  - Total: 48,000
  - Density: 450/km^{2} (1,200/sq mi)
- Time zone: UTC+8 (China Standard)
- Postal code: 411400
- Area code: 0732

Baitian Town (simplified Chinese: 白田镇; traditional Chinese: 白田鎮; pinyin: Báitián Zhèn) is an urban town under the administration of Xiangxiang City, Xiangtan City, Hunan Province, People's Republic of China.

== Administrative divisions ==
The town is divided into 34 villages and two districts: Fenbitan District (粉壁滩社区), Fenlukou District (分路口社区), Dongsheng Village (东胜村), Dahe Village (大禾村), Baitian Village (白田村), Changjiang Village (长江村), Xinmiao Village (新苗村), Xunshan Village (薰山村), Qiaopu Village (桥铺村), Wuxing Village (五星村), Zhigong Village (至公村), Hehua Village (荷花村), Dachong Village (大冲村), Zili Village (自力村), Shanglu Village (上麓村), Gaochong Village (高冲村), Gaofeng Village (高丰村), Xunfeng Village (薰峰村), Shangfu Village (上扶村), Shijiang Village (石江村), Shimen Village (石门村), Renhou Village (仁厚村), Sanxin Village (三新村), Bantang Village (板塘村), Zhongxing Village (中兴村), Dongmao Village (东毛村), Sanqian Village (三迁村), Taofeng Village (桃丰村), Baishi Village (白石村), Jizhong Village (集中村), Yuzi Village (芋子村), Chetian Village, (车田村) Congxin Village (从新村), Xinghui Village (星辉村), Shatian Village (沙田村), and Banqiao Village (班桥村).
