= Shaoshan =

County-level city in Xiangtan, Hunan, China

Shaoshan 韶山市
- County-level and sub-prefectural city
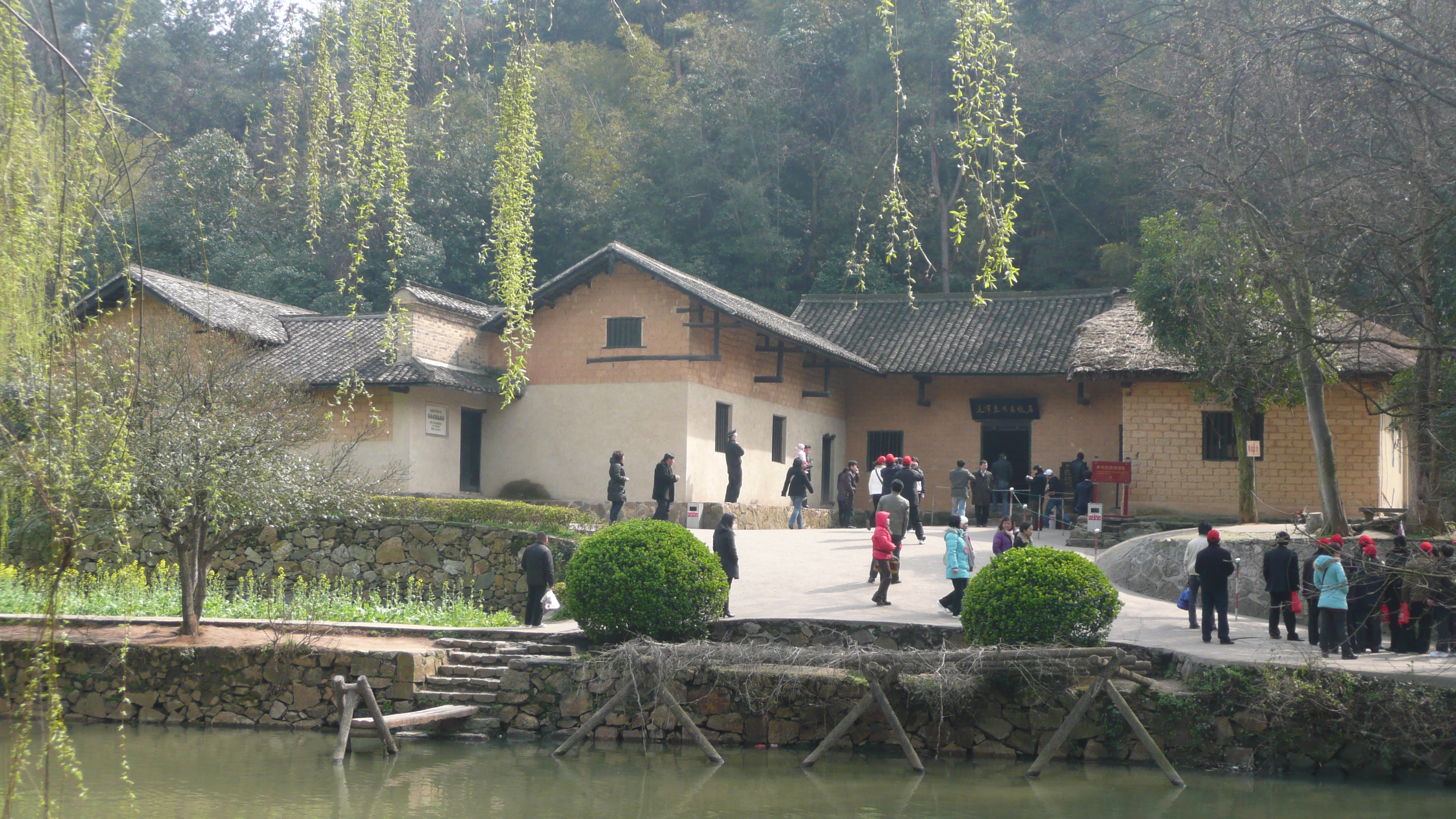
- Mao Zedong's birthplace

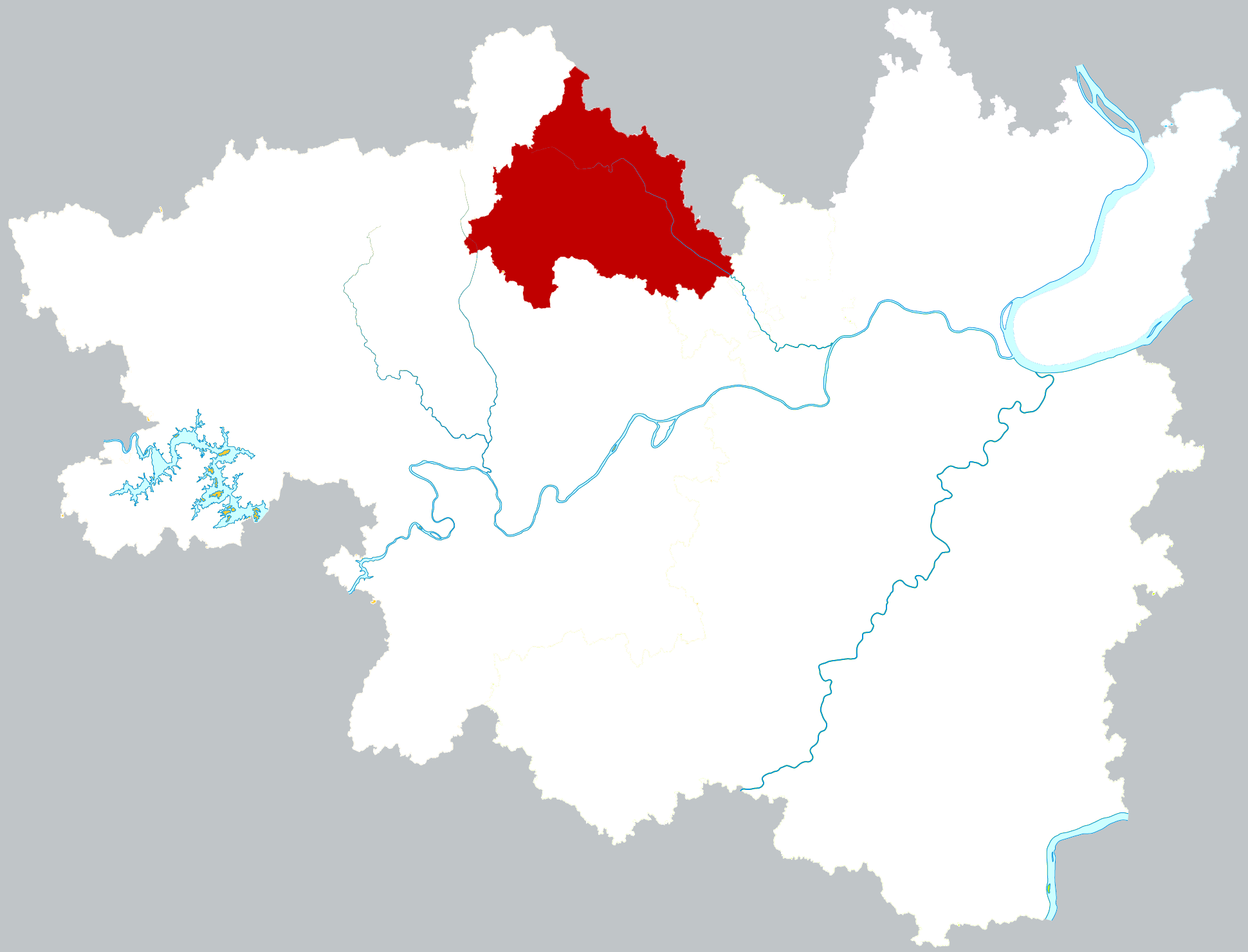

- Location in Hunan Shaoshan (China)
- Coordinates (Shaoshan government): 27°54′54″N 112°31′36″E
- Country: China
- Province: Hunan
- Prefecture-level city: Xiangtan
- Seat: Qingxi Town

Area
  - County-level and sub-prefectural city: 247.3 km^{2} (95.5 sq mi)
  - Urban: 32.00 km^{2} (12.36 sq mi)

Population (2015)
  - County-level and sub-prefectural city: 118,236
  - Density: 478.1/km^{2} (1,238/sq mi)
  - Urban: 49,500
- Time zone: UTC+8 (China Standard)

Shaoshan (Chinese: 韶山; pinyin: Sháoshān) is a county-level city in Hunan province, China. It is under the administration of the prefecture-level city of Xiangtan. Qingxi Town is its seat.

Located on the mid-eastern Hunan and the mid-north of Xiangtan, Shaoshan is bordered by Ningxiang to the north, Xiangxiang to the west and southwest, Xiangtan County to the east and southeast. It covers an area of 247.3 km^{2} (95.5 sq mi), as of 2015, it has a census registered population of 118,236 and a permanent resident population of 97,800. It is the smallest administrative unit by size or by population in the counties and county-level cities in Hunan province.

As the birthplace of Mao Zedong, the founder of the People's Republic of China, Shaoshan was an important base during the Chinese Communist Revolution. Mao remains a popular figure in the area, and red tourism to Shaoshan is a significant driver of the local economy.

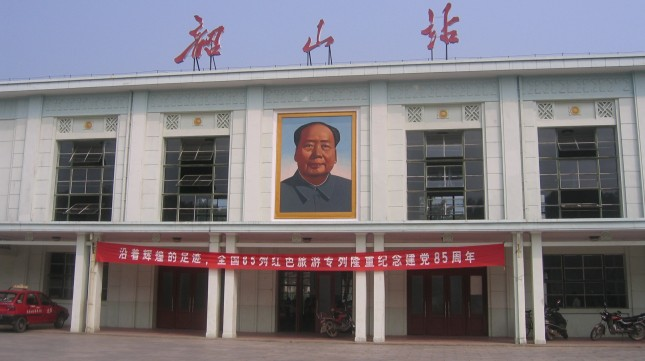
Shaoshan train station

== History ==
Shaoshan's founding legend involves Emperor Shun, who supposedly passed through the site during his southward inspection. He was so fascinated with the landscape that he played the Music of Shao (韶乐), which summoned many phoenixes and other birds to accompany him. Thus was Shaoshan named for the Music of Shao. It was under the jurisdiction of the state of Chu in the ancient times.

On December 26, 1990, Shaoshan became a county-level city approved by the State Council.

Names and administrative levels of Shaoshan:

- 1652 (Qing dynasty): Qidu (七都), Xiangtan District (县)
- 1912 (Republic of China): The Second District (第二区), Xi Township (西乡), Xiangtan County
- December 1932: The Ninth District, Xiangtan County
- 1947: Qingtian Township, Xiangtan County (de jure)
- January 1950 (People's Republic of China): The Third District, Xiangtan County
- 1951: The Fourth District, Xiangtan County
- August 1, 1955: Yintian District, Xiangtan County
- 1956: Yintian Town, Xiangtan County
- September 1, 1958: Shaoshan People's Commune, Xiangtan County
- May 12, 1961: Shaoshan District, Xiangtan County
- December 1968: county-controlled district status upgraded to regional district (地级区), controlled directly by the province
- December 1981: reverted to be county-controlled
- December 1984: upgraded to county-class district (县级区), controlled by Xiangtan City
- December 26, 1990: Upgraded to county-class city, controlled by Xiangtan City on behalf of the province.

== Administrative divisions ==
After an adjustment of subdistrict divisions of Shaoshan City on 16 November 2015, Shaoshan City has two towns and two townships under its jurisdiction. they are:

2 towns

- Qingxi, Shaoshan (清溪镇): Yongyi, Ruyi and the former Qingxi merged
- Yintian, Shaoshan (银田镇)

2 townships

- Shaoshan Township (韶山乡): Daping and the former Shaoshan Township merged
- Yanglin, Shaoshan (杨林乡)

== Description ==
Shaoshan has a population of 100,000, of which 16,000 are not farmers. It covers an area of 210 km^{2} (81 sq mi). It is located in the east-central hilly region of Hunan province, the geographical coordinates are longitude 112 ° 23'52 "-112 ° 38'13", latitude 27 ° 51'40 "-28 ° 1'53".

Shaoshan's topography is dominated by Mt. Shaofeng and the Shao and Shishi Rivers, with hills in the west giving rise to a mix of hills and plains in the east. The peak of Mount Shaofeng, 518.5 m above sea level, is the highest point whereas Liumuzhou, 48 m above sea level, is the lowest point of the whole city.

== Sister cities ==
- Vidnoye, Moscow Oblast, Russia

== Geography ==
=== Climate ===
Climate data for Shaoshan, elevation 88 m (289 ft), (1991–2020 normals, extremes 1981–present)
| Month | Jan | Feb | Mar | Apr | May | Jun | Jul | Aug | Sep | Oct | Nov | Dec | Year |
|---|---|---|---|---|---|---|---|---|---|---|---|---|---|
| Record high °C (°F) | 24.2 (75.6) | 30.1 (86.2) | 33.0 (91.4) | 35.0 (95.0) | 36.3 (97.3) | 37.2 (99.0) | 39.4 (102.9) | 40.8 (105.4) | 37.4 (99.3) | 35.0 (95.0) | 32.1 (89.8) | 24.5 (76.1) | 40.8 (105.4) |
| Mean daily maximum °C (°F) | 8.6 (47.5) | 11.6 (52.9) | 15.9 (60.6) | 22.4 (72.3) | 26.8 (80.2) | 30.0 (86.0) | 33.4 (92.1) | 32.7 (90.9) | 28.5 (83.3) | 23.3 (73.9) | 17.6 (63.7) | 11.5 (52.7) | 21.9 (71.3) |
| Daily mean °C (°F) | 4.9 (40.8) | 7.4 (45.3) | 11.4 (52.5) | 17.4 (63.3) | 22.0 (71.6) | 25.6 (78.1) | 28.9 (84.0) | 27.9 (82.2) | 23.5 (74.3) | 18.1 (64.6) | 12.5 (54.5) | 7.1 (44.8) | 17.2 (63.0) |
| Mean daily minimum °C (°F) | 2.4 (36.3) | 4.6 (40.3) | 8.2 (46.8) | 13.8 (56.8) | 18.4 (65.1) | 22.4 (72.3) | 25.3 (77.5) | 24.5 (76.1) | 20.2 (68.4) | 14.8 (58.6) | 9.2 (48.6) | 4.0 (39.2) | 14.0 (57.2) |
| Record low °C (°F) | −6.2 (20.8) | −8.8 (16.2) | −2.5 (27.5) | 1.4 (34.5) | 9.3 (48.7) | 13.2 (55.8) | 18.6 (65.5) | 16.7 (62.1) | 10.1 (50.2) | 2.4 (36.3) | −1.6 (29.1) | −12.1 (10.2) | −12.1 (10.2) |
| Average precipitation mm (inches) | 71.1 (2.80) | 85.6 (3.37) | 147.1 (5.79) | 169.4 (6.67) | 201.3 (7.93) | 226.6 (8.92) | 153.9 (6.06) | 105.1 (4.14) | 82.5 (3.25) | 64.1 (2.52) | 74.4 (2.93) | 54.4 (2.14) | 1,435.5 (56.52) |
| Average precipitation days (≥ 0.1 mm) | 14.0 | 14.5 | 18.0 | 17.0 | 16.7 | 15.6 | 10.4 | 10.9 | 9.1 | 9.9 | 10.6 | 11.3 | 158 |
| Average snowy days | 4.9 | 2.7 | 0.6 | 0 | 0 | 0 | 0 | 0 | 0 | 0 | 0.1 | 1.8 | 10.1 |
| Average relative humidity (%) | 81 | 81 | 83 | 82 | 82 | 84 | 77 | 80 | 82 | 80 | 80 | 78 | 81 |
| Mean monthly sunshine hours | 61.1 | 60.8 | 74.4 | 104.3 | 130.1 | 125.6 | 212.0 | 194.7 | 144.3 | 126.0 | 108.7 | 93.8 | 1,435.8 |
| Percentage possible sunshine | 19 | 19 | 20 | 27 | 31 | 30 | 50 | 48 | 39 | 36 | 34 | 29 | 32 |
Source: China Meteorological Administration All-time Dec high
