= List of township-level divisions of Hunan =

This is a list of township-level divisions of the province of Hunan, China.

== Changsha City ==
=== Furong District ===
13 subdistricts in Furong District (December 29, 2011 – present)
13 subdistricts	Chaoyangjie (朝阳街街道) Dingwangtai (定王台街道) Dong'an (东岸街道) Donghu (东湖街道) Dongtundu (东屯渡街道) Hehuayuan (荷花园街道) Huoxing (火星街道) Jiucaiyuan (韭菜园街道) Mapoling (马坡岭街道) Mawangdui (马王堆街道) Wenyilu (文艺路街道) Wulipai (五里牌街道) Xianghu (湘湖街道)
1 other area	Longping Gaokejiyuan Administrative Committee (隆平高科技园管委会)

=== Tianxin District ===
14 subdistricts in Tianxin District (February 27, 2015 – present)
14 subdistricts	Chennanlu (城南路街道) Chilinglu (赤岭路街道) Datuopu (大圫铺街道) Guihuaping (桂花坪街道) Heishipu (黑石铺街道) Jinpengling (金盆岭街道) Muyun (暮云街道) Nantuo (南圫街道) Pozijie (坡子街街道) Qingyuan, Changsha (青园街道) Wenyuan (文源街道) Xianfeng, Changsha (先锋街道) Xinkaipu (新开铺街道) Yunanjie (裕南街街道)

=== Yuelu District ===
17 subdistricts and 2 towns in Yuelu District (March 1, 2017 – present)
17 subdistricts	Dongfanghong (东方红街道) Guanshaling (观沙岭街道) Hanpu (含浦街道) Juzizhou (桔子洲街道) Lugu (麓谷街道) Meixihu (梅溪湖街道) Pingtang (坪塘街道) Tianding (天顶街道) Wangchengpo (望城坡街道) Wangyuehu (望月湖街道) Wangyue (望岳街道) Xihu (西湖街道) Xianjiahu (咸嘉湖街道) Xueshi (学士街道) Yanghu (洋湖街道) Yinpenling (银盆岭街道) Yuelu subDistrict (岳麓街道)
2 towns	Lianhua (莲花镇) Yuchangping (雨敞坪镇)

=== Kaifu District ===
16 subdistricts in Kaifu District (November 19, 2015 – present)
16 subdistricts	Dongfenglu (东风路街道) Furongbeilu (芙蓉北路街道) Hongshan (洪山街道) Laodaohe (捞刀河街道) Liuyanghe (浏阳河街道) Qingshuitang (清水塘街道) Qingzhuhu (青竹湖街道) Shaping (沙坪街道) Sifangping (四方坪街道) Tongtaijie (通泰街街道) Wangluyuan (望麓园街道) Wujialing (伍家岭街道) Xiangyalu (湘雅路街道) Xinhe (新河街道) Xiufeng (秀峰街道) Yuehu (月湖街道)

=== Yuhua District ===
12 Subdistricts and a town in Yuhua District (February 27, 2015 – present)
12 subdistricts	Dongjing (洞井街道) Dongshan (东山街道) Dongtang (东塘街道) Gaoqiao (高桥街道) Guitang (圭塘街道) Houjiatang (侯家塘街道) Jingwanzi (井湾子街道) Lituo (黎圫街道) Shazitang (砂子塘街道) Tongsheng (同升街道) Yuhuating (雨花亭街道) Zuojiatang (左家塘街道)
1 town	Tiaoma (跳马镇)

=== Wangcheng District ===
10 subdistricts and 5 towns in Wangcheng District (November 19, 2015 – present)
10 subdistricts	Baishazhou (白沙州街道) Dazehu (大泽湖街道) Dingziwan (丁字湾街道) Gaotangling (高塘岭街道) Huangjinyuan (黄金园街道) Jinshanqiao (金山桥街道) Leifeng (雷锋街道) Tongguan (铜官街道) Wushan (乌山街道) Yueliangdao (月亮岛街道)
5 towns	*Bairuopu Town (白箬铺镇) Chating Town (茶亭镇) Jinggang Town (靖港镇) Qiaokou Town (乔口镇) Qiaoyi Town (桥驿镇)

=== Changsha County ===
5 subdistricts and 13 towns in Changsha County (November 19, 2015 – present)
5 subdistricts	Changlong (长龙街道) Langli (榔梨街道) Quantang (泉塘街道) Xianglong (湘龙街道) Xingsha (星沙街道)
13 towns	Ansha Town (安沙镇) Beishan Town (北山镇) Chunhua Town (春华镇) Fulin Town (福临镇) Gaoqiao Town (高桥镇) Guoyuan Town (果园镇) Huanghua Town (黄花镇) Huangxing Town (黄兴镇) Jiangbei (江背镇) Jinjing (金井镇) Kaihui (开慧镇) Lukou (路口镇) Qingshanpu (青山铺镇)

=== Ningxiang City ===
4 subdistricts, 21 towns and 4 townships in Ningxiang City (November 19, 2015 – present)
4 subdistricts	Baimaqiao (白马桥街道) Chengjiao (城郊街道) Lijingpu (历经铺街道) Yutan (玉潭街道)
21 towns	Batang (坝塘镇) Dachengqiao (大成桥镇) Daolin (道林镇) Datunying (大屯营镇) Donghutang (东湖塘镇) Hengshi (横市镇) Huaminglou (花明楼镇) Huangcai (黄材镇) Huilongpu (回龙铺镇) Huitang (灰汤镇) Jinzhou (金洲镇) Laoliangcang (老粮仓镇) Liushahe (流沙河镇) Longtian (龙田镇) Meitanba (煤炭坝镇) Qingshanqiao (青山桥镇) Shuangfupu (双凫铺镇) Shuangjiangkou (双江口镇) Xiaduopu (夏铎铺镇) Xiangzikou (巷子口镇) Zifu (资福镇)
4 townships	Jinghuapu (菁华铺乡) Shatian (沙田乡) Weishan (沩山乡) Yujia'ao (喻家坳乡)

=== Liuyang City ===
4 subdistricts, 26 towns and 2 townships in Liuyang City (November 18, 2015 – present)
4 subdistricts	Guankou (关口街道) Hehua (荷花街道) Huaichuan (淮川街道) Jili (集里街道)
26 towns	Baijia (柏加镇) Beisheng (北盛镇) Chengchong (枨冲镇) Chengtanjiang (澄潭江镇) Chunkou (淳口镇) Dahu (达浒镇) Daweishan (大围山镇) Dayao (大瑶镇) Dongyang (洞阳镇) Gaoping (高坪镇) Gejia (葛家镇) Guandu (官渡镇) Guanqiao (官桥镇) Gugang (古港镇) Jingang (金刚镇) Longfu (龙伏镇) Puji (普迹镇) Shashi (沙市镇) Shegang (社港镇) Wenjiashi (文家市镇) Yanxi (沿溪镇) Yong'an (永安镇) Yonghe (永和镇) Zhangfang (张坊镇) Zhentou (镇头镇) Zhonghe (中和镇)
2 townships	Jiaoxi (蕉溪乡) Xiaohe (小河乡)

== Zhuzhou City ==
=== Hetang District ===
5 subdistricts and a town in Hetang District (November 20, 2015 – present)
5 subdistricts	Cigutang (茨菇塘街道) Guihua (桂花街道) Jinshan (金山街道) Songjiaqiao (宋家桥街道) Yuetang (月塘街道)
a town	Xianyu (仙庾镇)

=== Lusong District ===
5 subdistricts and a town in Lusong District (November 20, 2015 – present)
7 subdistricts	Hejiatu (贺家土街道) Jianshe (建设街道) Jianning (建宁街道) Qingyun (庆云街道) Fengxi (枫溪街道) Longquan (龙泉街道) Dongjiaduan (董家塅街道)
a town	Baiguan, Zhuzhou (白关镇)

=== Shifeng District ===
6 subdistricts and a town in Shifeng District (November 26, 2015 – present)
6 subdistricts	Jinglong (井龙街道) Qingshuitang (清水塘街道) Tianxin (田心街道) Tongtangwan (铜塘湾街道) Xiangshiling (响石岭街道) Xuelin (学林街道)
a town	Yuntian (云田镇)

=== Tianyuan District ===
3 subdistricts and 3 towns in Tianyuan District (November 26, 2015 – present)
3 subdistricts	Liyu Subdistrict (栗雨街道) Songshanlu (嵩山路街道) Taishanlu (泰山路街道)
3 towns	Leidashi (雷打石镇) Qunfeng (群丰镇) Sanmen, Zhuzhou (三门镇)

=== Liling City ===
4 subdistricts and 19 towns in Liling City (November 26, 2015 – present)
4 subdistricts	Guoci (国瓷街道) · Lailongmen (来龙门街道) · Xianyueshan (仙岳山街道) · Yangsanshi (阳三石街道)
19 towns	Baitutan (白兔潭镇) · Banshan (板杉镇) · Chashan (茶山镇) · Chuanwan (船湾镇) · Dongfu (东富镇) · Fenglin (枫林镇) · Guanzhuang (官庄镇) · Jiashu (嘉树镇) · Junchu (均楚镇) · Litian (李畋镇) · Mingyue (明月镇) · Pukou (浦口镇) · Shentan (沈潭镇) · Shiting (石亭镇) · Sifen (泗汾镇) · Sunjiawan (孙家湾镇) · Wangxian (王仙镇) · Weishan (沩山镇) · Zuoquan (左权镇)

=== Chaling County ===
4 subdistricts, 10 towns and 2 townships in Chaling County (November 20, 2015 – present)
4 subdistricts	Mijiang (洣江街道) · Sicong (思聪街道) · Xiadong (下东街道) · Yunyang (云阳街道)
10 towns	Gaolong (高陇镇) · Huju (虎踞镇) · Hukou (湖口镇) · Huotian (火田镇) · Jieshou (界首镇) · Majiang (马江镇) · Yantang (严塘镇) · Yaolu (腰潞镇) · Zaoshi (枣市镇) · Zhitang (秩堂镇)
2 townships	Lingfang (舲舫乡) ·Taokeng (桃坑乡)

=== Yanling County ===
5 towns and 5 townships in Yanling County (November 20, 2015 – present)
5 towns	Luyuan (鹿原镇) · Miandu (沔渡镇) · Shidu (十都镇) · Shuikou (水口镇) · Xiayang (霞阳镇)
4 townships	Ceyuan (策源乡) · Chuanxing (船形乡) · Longxi (垄溪乡) · Xiacun (下村乡)
1 Yao ethnic township	Zhongcun (中村瑶族乡)

=== You County ===
4 subdistricts and 13 towns in You County (November 26, 2015 – present)
4 subdistricts	Chunlian (春联街道) · Jiangqiao (江桥街道) · Lianxing (联星街道) · Tanqiao (谭桥街道)
13 towns	Caihuaping (菜花坪镇) · Huangfengqiao (黄丰桥镇) · Huangtuling (皇图岭镇) · Jiubujiang (酒埠江镇) · Liantang'ao (莲塘坳镇) · Luanshan (鸾山镇) · Lutian (渌田镇) · Ningjiaping (宁家坪镇) · Shiyangtang (石羊塘镇) · Taoshui (桃水镇) · Wangling (网岭镇) Xinshi (新市镇) · Yajiangqiao (丫江桥镇)

=== Lukou District ===
8 towns in Lukou District (November 26, 2015 – present)
8 towns	Gantian (淦田镇) · Guyuefeng (古岳峰镇)· Longchuan (龙船镇) · Longmen (龙门镇) · Longtan (龙潭镇) · Lukou (渌口镇) · Nanzhou (南洲镇) · Zhuting (朱亭镇)

== Xiangtan City ==
=== Yuetang District ===
15 township-level divisions in Yuetang District (November 19, 2015 – present)
14 subdistricts	Bantang (板塘街道)· Baota (宝塔街道)· Dongping (东坪街道)· Hetang (荷塘街道)· Hongqi (红旗街道)· Jianshelu (建设路街道)· Shejiancun (社建村街道)· Shuangma (双马街道)· Shuyuanlu (书院路街道)· Wulidui (五里堆街道)· Xiacheng (霞城街道)· Xiashesi (下摄司街道)· Yutang (岳塘街道)· Zhongzhoulu (中洲路街道)
1 town	Zhaoshan (昭山镇)

=== Yuhu District ===
17 township-level divisions in Yuhu District (November 19, 2015 – present)
12 subdistricts	Chengzhengjie (城正街街道)· Guangchang (广场街道)· Heping (和平街道)· Pingzhenglu (平政路街道)· Wanlou (万楼街道)· Xianfeng (先锋街道)· Yanggutang (羊牯塘街道)· Yaowan (窑湾街道)· Yuhulu (雨湖路街道)· Yuntang (云塘街道)· Zhaotan (昭潭街道)· Zhongshanlu (中山路街道)
3 towns	Heling (鹤岭镇)· Jiangshe (姜畲镇)· Nanzhushan (楠竹山镇)
2 townships	Changcheng (长城乡)· Xiangshui (响水乡)

=== Shaoshan City ===
4 township-level divisions in Shaoshan City (November 16, 2015 – present)
4 divisions	Qingxi (清溪镇)· Yintian (银田镇)· Shaoshan (韶山乡)· Yanglin (杨林乡)

=== Xiangxiang City ===
22 township-level divisions in Xiangxiang City (July 1, 2008 – present)
4 subdistricts	Dongshan (东山街道)·Kunlunqiao (昆仑桥街道)·Wangchunmen (望春门街道)·Xinxianglu (新湘路街道)
15 towns	Baitian (白田镇)·Fanjiang (翻江镇)·Hutian (壶天镇)·Jinshi (金石镇)·Lishan (栗山镇)·Longdong (龙洞镇)·Maotian (毛田镇)·Meiqiao (梅桥镇)·Qizi (棋梓镇)·Quantang (泉塘镇)·Shanzao (山枣镇)·Tanshi (潭市镇)·Yueshan (月山镇)·Yutang (虞塘镇)·Zhongsha (中沙镇)
3 townships	Dongjiao (东郊乡)·Jinsou (金薮乡)·Yuduan (育塅乡)

=== Xiangtan County ===
17 township-level divisions in Xiangtan County (November 19, 2015 – present)
14 towns	Baishi (白石镇) ·Cha'ensi (茶恩寺镇) ·Hekou (河口镇) ·Huashi (花石镇) ·Qingshaoqiao (青山桥镇) ·Shebu (射埠镇) ·Shigu (石鼓镇) ·Shitan (石潭镇) ·Tanjiashan (谭家山镇) ·Wushi (乌石镇) ·Yangjiaqiao (杨嘉桥镇) ·Yisuhe (易俗河镇) ·Yunhuqiao (云湖桥镇) ·Zhonglupu (中路铺镇)
3 townships	Fenshui Township (分水乡)·Jinshi Township (锦石乡)·Paitou Township (排头乡)

== Hengyang City ==
=== Nanyue District ===
3 township-level divisions in Nanyue District (November 18, 2015 – present)
3 divisions	Zhurong Subdistrict (祝融街道) ·Nanyue Town (南岳镇) ·Shouyue Township (寿岳乡)

=== Shigu District ===
8 township-level divisions in Shigu District (November 18, 2015 – present)
7 subdistricts	Hejiang (合江街道) ·Huangshawan (黄沙湾街道) ·Jinyuan (金源街道) ·Qingshan (青山街道) ·Renmin (人民街道) ·Wuyi (五一街道) ·Xiaoxiang (潇湘街道)
1 township	Jiaoshan (角山乡)

=== Yanfeng District ===
7 township-level divisions in Yanfeng District (November 18, 2015 – present)
6 subdistricts	Baishazhou (白沙洲街道) ·Huangchaling (黄茶岭街道) ·Jinlongping (金龙坪街道) ·Tianmashan (天马山街道) ·Xianfeng (先锋街道) ·Yanfeng (雁峰街道)
1 town	Yueping (岳屏镇)

=== Zhengxiang District ===
6 township-level divisions in Zhengxiang District (November 18, 2015 – present)
4 subdistricts	Hongxiang (红湘街道) ·Huaxing (华兴街道) ·Lianhe (联合街道) ·Zhengxiang (蒸湘街道)
2 towns	Aiyingling (呆鹰岭镇) ·Yumushan (雨母山镇)

=== Zhuhui District ===
9 township-level divisions in Zhuhui District (November 18, 2015 – present)
6 subdistricts	Dongyangdu (东阳渡街道) ·Guangdonglu (广东路街道) ·Hengzhoulu (衡州路街道) ·Miaopu (苗圃街道) ·Yejin (冶金街道) ·Yuehan (粤汉街道)
1 town	Chashan'ao (茶山坳镇)
2 townships	Heping (和平乡) ·Linghu (酃湖乡)

=== Changning City ===
21 township-level divisions in Changning City (November 9, 2015 – present)
3 subdistricts	Peiyuan (培元街道) ·Quanfeng (泉峰街道) ·Yiyang (宜阳街道)
14 towns	Baisha (白沙镇) ·Banqiao (板桥镇) ·Bofang (柏坊镇) ·Guanling (官岭镇) ·Luoqiao (罗桥镇) ·Miaoqian (庙前镇) ·Sanjiaotang (三角塘镇) ·Shengqiao (胜桥镇) ·Shuikoushan (水口山镇) ·Xiling (西岭镇) ·Xinhe (新河镇) ·Yangquan (洋泉镇) ·Yanzhou (烟洲镇) ·Yintian (荫田镇)
3 townships	Dabao (大堡乡) ·Lanjiang (兰江乡) ·Pengtang (蓬塘乡)
1 Yao ethnic township	Tashan (塔山瑶族乡)

=== Leiyang City ===
30 township-level divisions in Leiyang City (November 18, 2015 – present)
6 subdistricts	Caizichi (蔡子池街道) ·Sanjia (三架街道) ·Shuidongjiang (水东江街道) ·Wulipai (五里牌街道) ·Yuqing (余庆街道) ·Zaoshijie (灶市街街道)
19 town	Daozi (导子镇) Dashi (大市镇) ·Dayi (大义镇) ·Donghuxu (东湖圩镇) ·Feitian (淝田镇) ·Gongpingxu (公平圩镇) ·Huangshi (黄市镇) ·Longtang (龙塘镇) ·Mashui (马水镇) ·Nanjing (南京镇) ·Nanyang (南阳镇) ·Renyi (仁义镇) ·Sandu (三都镇) ·Xiaoshui (小水镇) ·Xiatang (夏塘镇) ·Xinshi (新市镇) ·Yaotian (遥田镇) ·Yongji (永济镇) ·Zheqiao (哲桥镇)
5 townships	Changping (长坪乡) ·Dahexu (大和圩乡) ·Liangyuan (亮源乡) ·Taipingxu (太平圩乡) ·Tanxia (坛下乡)

=== Hengdong County ===
17 township-level divisions in Hengdong County (November 18, 2015 – present)
15 towns	Bailian (白莲镇) ·Caoshi (草市镇) ·Dapu (大浦镇) ·Ganxi (甘溪镇) ·Gaohu (高湖镇) ·Mishui (洣水镇) ·Pengyuan (蓬源镇) ·Rongheng (荣桓镇) ·Sanzhang (三樟镇) ·Shiwan (石湾镇) ·Wuji (吴集镇) ·Xialiu (霞流镇) ·Xintang (新塘镇) ·Yanglin (杨林镇) ·Yangqiao (杨桥镇)
2 townships	Nanwan (南湾乡) ·Shitan (石滩乡)

=== Hengnan County ===
22 township-level divisions in Hengnan County (November 18, 2015 – present)
21 towns	Baogai (宝盖镇) ·Chashi (茶市镇) ·Guanshi (冠市镇) ·Hongshan (洪山镇) ·Huaqiao (花桥镇) ·Jiangkou (江口镇) ·Jilong (鸡笼镇) ·Jinweizhou (近尾洲镇) ·Liaotian (廖田镇) ·Lijiang (栗江镇) ·Liushi (硫市镇) ·Maoshi (茅市镇) ·Quanhu (泉湖镇) ·Quanxi (泉溪镇) ·Santang (三塘镇) ·Songjiang (松江镇) ·Tanzishan (谭子山镇) ·Tiesitang (铁丝塘镇) ·Xiantang (咸塘镇) ·Yunji (云集镇) ·Zuoshi (柞市镇)
1 township	Xiangshi (相市乡)

=== Hengshan County ===
13 township-level divisions in Hengshan County (November 18, 2015 – present)
7 towns	Baiguo (白果镇) ·Changjiang (长江镇) ·Dianmen (店门镇) ·Donghu (东湖镇) ·Kaiyun (开云镇) ·Xinqiao (新桥镇) ·Xuanzhou (萱洲镇)
5 townships	Futianpu (福田铺乡) ·Guantang (贯塘乡) ·Jiangdong (江东乡) ·Lingpo (岭坡乡) ·Yonghe (永和乡)

=== Hengyang County ===
25 township-level divisions in Hengyang County (November 18, 2015 – present)
17 towns	Chajiang (渣江镇) ·Guanshi (关市镇) ·Hongshi (洪市镇) ·Jibing (集兵镇) ·Jiepai (界牌镇) ·Jingtou (井头镇) ·Jinlan (金兰镇) ·Jinxi (金溪镇) ·Kuzongqiao (库宗桥镇) ·Qulan (曲兰镇) ·Sanhu (三湖镇) ·Shanqiao (杉桥镇) ·Shishi (石市镇) ·Taiyuan (台源镇) ·Xianshan (岘山镇) ·Xidu (西渡镇) ·Yanpi (演陂镇)
5 townships	Banshi (板市乡) ·Chang'an (长安乡) ·Da'an (大安乡) ·Goulou (岣嵝乡) ·Lanlong (栏垅乡) ·Xijiang (溪江乡) ·Zhangmu (樟木乡) ·Zhangshu (樟树乡)

=== Qidong County ===
24 township-level divisions in Qidong County (September 2014 – present)
4 subdistricts	Baihe (白鹤街道) ·Hongqiao (洪桥街道) ·Yongchang (永昌街道) ·Yuhe (玉合街道)
17 towns	Baidishi (白地市镇) ·Buyunqiao (步云桥镇) ·Diaojiang (鸟江镇) ·Fengshiyan (风石堰镇) ·Guanjiazui (官家嘴镇) ·Guiyang (归阳镇) ·Guoshuiping (过水坪镇) ·Hezhou (河洲镇) ·Huangtupu (黄土铺镇) ·Jiangjia (蒋家桥镇) ·Jinqiao (金桥镇) ·Liangshi (粮市镇) ·Lingguan (灵官镇) ·Shitingzi (石亭子镇) ·Shuangqiao (双桥镇) ·Taihetang (太和堂镇) ·Zhuantang (砖塘镇)
3 townships	Chenglian (城连圩乡) ·Fengdiping (凤歧坪乡) ·Maduqiao (马杜桥乡)

== Shaoyang City ==
=== Beita District ===
3 township-level divisions in Beita District (November 24, 2015 – present)
divisions	Chenjiaqiao Township (陈家桥乡) ·Xintanzhen Subdistrict (新滩镇街道) ·Zhuangyuanzhou Subdistrict (状元洲街道)

=== Daxiang District ===
12 township-level divisions in Daxiang District (November 24, 2015 – present)
9 subdistricts	Baichunyuan (百春园街道) ·Chengbeilu (城北路街道) ·Chengnan (城南街道) ·Chengxi (城西街道) ·Cuiyuan (翠园街道) ·Hongqilu (红旗路街道) ·Huochenanzhan (火车南站街道) ·Xueyuanlu (学院路街道) ·Zhongxinlu (中心路街道)
1 town	Luoshi (罗市镇)
2 townships	Banqiao (板桥乡) ·Cai'e (蔡锷乡)

=== Shuangqing District ===
9 township-level divisions in Shuangqing District (November 24, 2015 – present)
6 subdistricts	Dongfenglu (东风路街道) ·Longxutang (龙须塘街道) ·Qiaotou (桥头街道) ·Qichezhan (汽车站街道) ·Xiaojianghu (小江湖街道) ·Xinglong (兴隆街道)
2 towns	Dutouqiao (渡头桥镇) ·Gaochongshan (高崇山镇)
1 township	Huochezhan (火车站乡)

=== Wugang City ===
16 township-level divisions in Wugang City (November 24, 2015 – present)
4 subdistricts	Faxiangyan (法相岩街道) ·Shuiximen (水西门街道) ·Yingchunting (迎春亭街道) ·Yuanmenkou (辕门口街道)
11 towns	Choushutang (稠树塘镇) ·Dadian (大甸镇) ·Dengjiapu (邓家铺镇) ·Dengyuantai (邓元泰镇) ·Jingzhupu (荆竹铺镇) ·Longxi (龙溪镇) ·Qinqiao (秦桥镇) ·Shuangpai (双牌镇) ·Simachong (司马冲镇) ·Wantouqiao (湾头桥镇) ·Wenping (文坪镇)
3 townships	·Maping (马坪乡) ·Shuijinping (水浸坪乡) ·Yantian (晏田乡)

=== Chengbu County ===
12 township-level divisions in Chengbu Miao Autonomous County (December 2, 2015 – present)
6 towns	Chang'anying (长安营镇) ·Dankou (丹口镇) ·Maoping (茅坪镇) ·Rulin (儒林镇) ·Wutuan (五团镇) ·Xiyan (西岩镇)
6 townships	Baimaoping (白毛坪乡) ·Dingping (汀坪乡) ·Jiangfang (蒋坊乡) ·Jinzi (金紫乡) ·Lanrong (兰蓉乡) ·Weixi (威溪乡)

=== Dongkou County ===
23 township-level divisions in Dongkou County (July 30, 2015 – present)
3 subdistricts	Huagu (花古街道) ·Wenchang (文昌街道) ·Xuefeng (雪峰街道)
11 towns	Gaosha (高沙镇) ·Huayuan (花园镇) ·Huangqiao (黄桥镇) ·Jiangkou (江口镇) ·Liaotian (醪田镇) ·Shanmen (山门镇) ·Shijiang (石江镇) ·Shuidong (水东镇) ·Yanqian (岩山镇) ·Yulan (毓兰镇) ·Zhushi (竹市镇)
6 townships	Gulou (古楼乡) ·Shizhu (石柱乡) ·Tongshan (桐山乡) ·Yanglin (杨林乡) ·Yuexi (月溪乡) ·Zhaping (渣坪乡)
3 Yao ethnic townships	Changtang (长塘瑶族乡) ·Dawu (大屋瑶族乡) ·Luoxi (罗溪瑶族乡)

=== Longhui County ===
24 township-level divisions in Longhui County (November 24, 2015 – present)
17 towns	Beishan (北山镇) ·Gaoping (高平镇) ·Hengbanqiao (横板桥镇) ·Hexiangqiao (荷香桥镇) ·Jinshiqiao (金石桥镇) ·Liuduzhai (六都寨镇) ·Nanyuemiao (南岳庙镇) ·Qijiang (七江镇) ·Sangesi (三阁司镇) ·Simenqian (司门前镇) ·Tantou (滩头镇) ·Taohong (桃洪镇) ·Xiaoshajiang (小沙江镇) ·Xiyangjiang (西洋江镇) ·Yankou (岩口镇) ·Yatian (鸭田镇) ·Zhouwang (周旺镇)
5 townships	Dashuitian (大水田乡) ·Hetian (荷田乡) ·Luohong (罗洪乡) ·Matangshan (麻塘山乡) ·Yanggu'ao (羊古坳乡)
2 ethnic townships	Huxingshan (虎形山瑶族乡) ·Shanjie (山界回族乡)

=== Shaodong County ===
25 township-level divisions in Shaodong County (December 2, 2015 – present)
3 subdistricts	Dahetang (大禾塘街道) ·Liangshitang (两市塘街道) ·Songjiaping (宋家塘街道)
18 towns	Heitianpu (黑田铺镇) ·Huochangping (火厂坪镇) ·Huochaqiao (仙槎桥镇) ·Jianjialong (简家陇镇) ·Jieling (界岭镇) ·Jiulongling (九龙岭镇) ·Lianqiao (廉桥镇) ·Lingguandian (灵官殿镇) ·Liuguangling (流光岭镇) ·Liuze (流泽镇) ·Niumasi (牛马司镇) ·Shashi (砂石镇) ·Shetianqiao (佘田桥镇) ·Shuidongjiang (水东江镇) ·Tuanshan (团山镇) ·Weijiaqiao (魏家桥镇) ·Yangqiao (杨桥镇) ·Yejiping (野鸡坪镇)
4 townships	Baomianqian (堡面前乡) ·Shuangfeng (双凤乡) ·Zhouguanqiao (周官桥乡) ·Zhuoshicao (斫石曹乡)

=== Shaoyang County ===
20 township-level divisions in Shaoyang County (November 24, 2015 – present)
12 towns	Baicang (白仓镇) ·Changyangpu (长阳铺镇) ·Guzhou (谷洲镇) ·Huangtingshi (黄亭市镇) ·Jinchengshi (金称市镇) ·Jiugongqiao (九公桥镇) ·Lijiaping (郦家坪镇) ·Tangdukou (塘渡口镇) ·Tangtianshi (塘田市镇) ·Wufengpu (五峰铺镇) ·Xiahuaqiao (下花桥镇) ·Yankoupu (岩口铺镇)
8 townships	Caijiaqiao (蔡桥乡) ·Changle (长乐乡) ·Hebo (河伯乡) ·Huangjing (黄荆乡) ·Jinjiang (金江乡) ·Luocheng (罗城乡) ·Xiaoxishi (小溪市乡) ·Zhujiating (诸甲亭乡)

=== Suining County ===
17 township-level divisions in Suining County (December 2, 2015 – present)
8 towns	Changpu (长铺镇) ·Huangtukuang (黄土矿镇) ·Jinwutang (金屋塘镇) ·Lixiqiao (李熙桥镇) ·Tangjiafang (唐家坊镇) ·Wawutang (瓦屋塘镇) ·Wuyang (武阳镇) ·Hongyan (红岩镇)
1 township	Shuikou (水口乡)
8 ethnic townships	Changpuzi (长铺子苗族侗族乡) ·Dongshan (东山侗族乡) ·Egongshan (鹅公岭侗族苗族乡) ·Guanxia (关峡苗族乡) ·Hekou (河口苗族乡) ·Le'anpu (乐安铺苗族侗族乡) ·Matang (麻塘苗族瑶族乡) ·Zhaishi (寨市苗族侗族乡)

=== Xinning County ===
16 township-level divisions in Xinning County (December 2, 2015 – present)
8 towns	Gaoqiao (高桥镇) ·Huanglong (黄龙镇) ·Huilongsi (回龙寺镇) ·Jinshi (金石镇) ·Langshan (崀山镇) ·Matouqiao (马头桥镇) ·Shuimiao (水庙镇) ·Yidushui (一渡水镇)
6 township	Anshan (安山乡) ·Fengtian (丰田乡) ·Jingwei (靖位乡) ·Qingjiangqiao (清江桥乡) ·Wantang (万塘乡) ·Xuntian (巡田乡)
2 Yao ethnic townships	Huangjin (黄金瑶族乡) ·Malin (麻林瑶族乡)

=== Xinshao County ===
15 township-level divisions in Xinshao County (April 2016 – present)
13 towns	Chenjiafang (陈家坊镇) ·Cunshi (寸石镇) ·Daxin (大新镇) ·Jukoupu (巨口铺镇) ·Longxipu (龙溪铺镇) ·Niangxi (酿溪镇) ·Pingshang (坪上镇) ·Quetang (雀塘镇) ·Taizhimiao (太芝庙镇) ·Tanxi (潭溪镇) ·Xiaotang (小塘镇) ·Xintianpu (新田铺镇) ·Yantang (严塘镇)
2 townships	Tanfu (潭府乡) ·Yingguang (迎光乡)

== Yueyang City ==
=== Junshan District ===
5 township-level divisions in Junshan District, Yueyang (November 20, 2015 – present)
1 subdistrict	Liulinzhou (柳林洲街道)
4 towns	Guangxinzhou (广兴洲镇) ·Liangxinbao (良心堡镇) ·Qianlianghu (钱粮湖镇) ·Xushi (许市镇)

=== Yueyanglou District ===
20 township-level divisions in Yueyanglou District, Yueyang (November 30, 2015 – present)
17 subdistricts	Chenglingji (城陵矶街道) ·Dongmaoling (东茅岭街道) ·Dongting (洞庭街道) ·Fengshuhu (枫桥湖街道) ·Hubin (湖滨街道) ·Jin'eshan (金鹗山街道) ·Luowang (洛王街道) ·Lüxianting (吕仙亭街道) ·Nanhu (南湖街道) ·Qijialing (奇家岭街道) ·Qiusuo (求索街道) ·Sanyanqiao (三眼桥街道) ·Wangjiahe (王家河街道) ·Wangyuelu (望岳路街道) ·Wulipai (五里牌街道) ·Yueyanglou (岳阳楼街道) ·Zhanqianlu (站前路街道)
1 town	Xitang (西塘镇)
2 townships	Guozhen (郭镇乡) ·Kangwang (康王乡)

=== Yunxi District ===
4 township-level divisions in Yunxi District, Yueyang (November 30, 2015 – present)
2 subdistricts	Changling (长岭街道) ·Yunxi (云溪街道)
2 towns	Lucheng (陆城镇) ·Lukou (路口镇)

=== Linxiang City ===
13 township-level divisions of Linxiang City (November 24, 2015 – present)
3 subdistricts	Chang'an (长安街道) ·Taokuang (桃矿街道) ·Wulipai (五里牌街道)
10 towns	Baiyangtian (白羊田镇) ·Changtang (长塘镇) ·Huanggai (黄盖镇) ·Jiangnan (江南镇) ·Nieshi (聂市镇) ·Tandu (坦渡镇) ·Taolin (桃林镇) ·Yanglousi (羊楼司镇) ·Zhanqiao (詹桥镇) ·Zhongfang (忠防镇)

=== Miluo City ===
19 township-level divisions in Miluo City (December 3, 2015 – present)
1 subdistrict	Tianwen (天问街道)
17 towns	Baishui (白水镇) ·Baitang (白塘镇) ·Bishi (弼时镇) ·Changle (长乐镇) ·Chuanshanping (川山坪镇) ·Dajing (大荆镇) ·Guiyi (归义镇) ·Gupei (古培镇) ·Heshi (河市镇) ·Luojiang (罗江镇) ·Miluo (汨罗镇) ·Quzici (屈子祠镇) ·Sanjiang (三江镇) ·Shendingshan (神鼎山镇) ·Taolinshi (桃林寺镇) ·Xinshi (新市镇) ·Yingtian (营田镇)
1 township	Fenghuang (凤凰乡)
Quyuan mgmt Dist	Fenghuang (凤凰乡) ·Heshi (河市镇) ·Tianwen (天问街道) ·Yingtian (营田镇)

=== Huarong County ===
14 township-level divisions of Huarong County (November 20, 2015 – present)
12 towns	Beijinggang (北景港镇) ·Caojun (操军镇) ·Chaqi (插旗镇) ·Dongshan (东山镇) ·Meitianhu (梅田湖镇) ·Nianyuxu (鲇鱼须镇) ·Sanfengsi (三封寺镇) ·Wanyu (万庾镇) ·Yushan (禹山镇) ·Zhanghua (章华镇) ·Zhihedu (治河渡镇) ·Zhuzikou (注滋口镇)
2 townships	Tuanzhou (团洲乡) ·Xinhe (新河乡)

=== Pingjiang County ===
24 township-level divisions of Pingjiang County (November 24, 2015 – present)
19 towns	Anding (安定镇) ·Cenchuan (岑川镇) ·Changshou (长寿镇) ·Fushoushan (福寿山镇) ·Hanchang (汉昌镇) ·Hongqiao (虹桥镇) ·Jiayi (加义镇) ·Longmen (龙门镇) ·Meixian (梅仙镇) ·Nanjiang (南江镇) ·Sanshi (三市镇) ·Shangtashi (上塔市镇) ·Tongshi (童市镇) ·Wengjiang (瓮江镇) ·Wukou (浯口镇) ·Wushi (伍市镇) ·Xiangjia (向家镇) ·Niushizhai (石牛寨镇) ·Yuping (余坪镇)
5 townships	Banjiang (板江乡) ·Dazhou (大洲乡) ·Mujin (木金乡) ·Sandun (三墩乡) ·Sanyang (三阳乡)

=== Xiangyin County ===
14 township-level divisions of Xiangyin County (November 20, 2015 – present)
10 towns	Dongtang(东塘镇) ·Helonghu (鹤龙湖镇) ·Jinlong (金龙镇) ·Lingbei (岭北镇) ·Nanhuzhou (南湖洲镇) ·Santang (三塘镇) ·Wenxing (文星镇) ·Xiangbin (湘滨镇) ·Xinquan (新泉镇) ·Zhangshu (樟树镇)
4 townships	Jinghe (静河乡) ·Liutang (六塘乡) ·Yanglinzhai (杨林寨乡) ·Yuhua (玉华乡)

=== Yueyang County ===
14 township-level divisions of Yueyang County (November 17, 2017 – present)
12 towns	Baixiang (柏祥镇) ·Buxian (步仙镇) ·Gangkou (筻口镇) ·Gongtian (公田镇) ·Huangshajie (黄沙街镇) ·Maotian (毛田镇) ·Rongjiawan (荣家湾镇) ·Xinkai (新开镇) ·Xinqiang (新墙镇) ·Yanglinjie (杨林街镇) ·Yuetian (月田镇) ·Zhangguying (张谷英镇)
2 townships	Changhu (长湖乡) ·Zhongzhou (中洲乡)

== Changde City ==
=== Dingcheng District ===
24 township-level divisions of Dingcheng District, Changde (November 23, 2015 – present)
4 subdistricts	Doumuhu (斗姆湖街道) ·Guojiapu (郭家铺街道) ·Hongyun (红云街道) ·Yuxia (玉霞街道)
19 towns	Caijiagang (蔡家岗镇) ·Caoping (草坪镇) ·Guanxitan (灌溪镇) ·Hangongdu (韩公渡镇) ·Haozigang (蒿子港镇) ·Huangtudian (黄土店镇) ·Huayanxi (花岩溪镇) ·Niubitan (牛鼻滩镇) ·Shibantan (石板滩镇) ·Shigongqiao (石公桥镇) ·Shimeitang (十美堂镇) ·Shimenqiao (石门桥镇) ·Shuangqiaoping (双桥坪镇) ·Xiejiapu (谢家铺镇) ·Yaotianping (尧天坪镇) ·Zhendeqiao (镇德桥镇) ·Zhonghekou (中河口镇) ·Zhoujiadian (周家店镇) ·Zhufeng (祝丰镇)
1 Uyghur ethnic township	Xujiaqiao (许家桥回族维吾尔族乡)

=== Wuling District ===
14 township-level divisions of Wuling District, Changde (August 18, 2014 – present)
11 subdistricts	Baimahu (白马湖街道) ·Changgeng (长庚街道) ·Chuanzihe (穿紫河街道) ·Danyang (丹阳街道) ·Dongjiang (东江街道) ·Fuping (府坪街道) ·Furong (芙蓉街道) ·Nanpinggang (南坪岗街道) ·Qiming (启明街道) ·Yong'an (永安街道) ·Zhilan (芷兰街道)
1 town	Hefu (河洑镇)
2 townships	Danzhou (丹洲乡) ·Ludishan (芦荻山乡)

=== Jinshi City ===
9 township-level divisions of Jinshi City (November 23, 2015)
5 subdistricts	Sanzhouyi (三洲驿街道) ·Wangjiaqiao (汪家桥街道) ·Xiangyangjie (襄阳街街道) ·Jinyuling (金鱼岭街道) ·Jiashan (嘉山街道)
4 towns	Xinzhou (新洲镇) ·Maolihu (毛里湖镇) ·Yaoshan (药山镇) ·Baiyi (白衣镇)

=== Anxiang County ===
19 township-level divisions of Anxiang County (November 21, 2021)
9 towns	Shenliu (深柳镇) ·Huangshantou (黄山头镇) ·Xiayukou (下渔口镇) ·Guandang (官垱镇) ·Sanchahe (三岔河镇) ·Dajinggang (大鲸港镇) ·Dahukou (大湖口镇) ·Chenjiazui (陈家嘴镇) Jiaoqi (焦圻镇)
10 townships	Anzhang (安障乡) ·Anquan (安全乡) ·Ankang (安康乡) ·Anfeng (安丰乡) Ande (安德乡) Anfu (安福乡) Anhong (安宏乡) Anning (安凝乡) Ansheng (安生乡) Anyu (安裕乡)

=== Hanshou County ===
23 township-level divisions of Hanshou County (November 20, 2015)
4 subdistricts	Canglang (沧浪街道) ·Chenyang (辰阳街道) ·Longyang (龙阳街道) ·Zhumushan (株木山街道)
16 towns	Bailuqiao (百禄桥镇) ·Canggang (沧港镇) ·Cuijiaqiao (崔家桥镇) ·Fengjiapu (丰家铺镇) ·Guantouzhen (罐头嘴镇) ·Jiangjiazui (蒋家嘴镇) ·Junshanpu (军山铺镇) ·Longtanqiao (龙潭桥镇) ·Potou (坡头镇) ·Taizimiao (太子庙镇) ·Xihu (西湖镇) ·Yangtaohu (洋淘湖镇) ·Yanwanghu (岩汪湖镇) ·Yougang (酉港镇) ·Zhoukou (洲口镇) ·Zhujiapu (朱家铺镇)
2 townships	Niejiaqiao (聂家桥乡) ·Xizhou (西洲乡)
1 Uyghur ethnic township	Maojiatan (毛家滩回族维吾尔族乡)

=== Li County ===
19 township-level divisions of Li County (November 23, 2015)
4 subdistricts	Lidan (澧澹街道) ·Lipu (澧浦街道) ·Lixi (澧西街道) ·Liyang (澧阳街道)
15 towns	Cennan (涔南镇) ·Chengtoushan (城头山镇) ·Dayandang (大堰垱镇) ·Fuxing (复兴镇) ·Ganxitan (甘溪滩镇) ·Guanyuan (官垸镇) ·Huolianpo (火连坡镇) ·Jinluo (金罗镇) ·Linan (澧南镇) ·Matoupu (码头铺镇) ·Mengxi (梦溪镇) ·Rudong (如东镇) ·Wangjiachang (王家厂镇) ·Xiaodukou (小渡口镇) ·Yanjing (盐井镇)

=== Linli County ===
11 township-level divisions of Linli County (2017–present)
2 subdistricts	Anfu (安福街道) ·Wangcheng (望城街道)
7 towns	Hekou (合口镇) ·Sheshiqiao (佘市桥镇) ·Sixingang (四新岗镇) ·Taifu (太浮镇) ·Tingxuandu (停弦渡镇) ·Xin'an (新安镇) ·Xiumei (修梅镇)
2 townships	Fenghuo (烽火乡) ·Kemushan (刻木山乡)

=== Shimen County ===
21 township-level divisions and 5 State-owned farms of Shimen County (June 19, 2015)
4 subdistricts	Chujiang Town (楚江镇) (Chujiang·Yongxin) · Erdu Township (二都乡) (Baofeng·Erdu)
11 towns	Baiyun (白云镇) ·Hupingshan (壶瓶山镇) ·Jiashan (夹山镇) ·Mengquan (蒙泉镇) ·Moshi (磨市镇) ·Nanbei (南北镇) ·Taiping (太平镇) ·Weixin (维新镇) ·Xinguan (新关镇) ·Yijiadu (易家渡镇) ·Zaoshi (皂市镇)
6 townships	Luoping (罗坪乡) ·Sansheng (三圣乡) ·Suojie (所街乡) ·Xinpu (新铺乡) ·Yanchi (雁池乡) ·Ziliang (子良乡)
5 State-owned farms	Datongshan (大同山林场) ·Dongshanfeng (东山峰农场) ·Longfengyuan (龙凤园艺场) ·Luopusi (洛浦寺林场) ·Xiupingyuan (秀坪园艺场)

=== Taoyuan County ===
29 township-level divisions of Taoyuan County (December 2017 – present)
2 subdistricts	Xunyang (浔阳街道) ·Zhangjiang (漳江街道)
23 towns	Chayanpu (茶庵铺镇) ·Guanyinsi (观音寺镇) ·Huangshi (黄石镇) ·Jianshi (剪市镇) ·Jiaqiao (架桥镇) ·Jiuxi (九溪镇) ·Ligonggang (理公港镇) ·Longtan (龙潭镇) ·Mazongling (马鬃岭镇) ·Mutangyuan (木塘垸镇) ·Niuchehe (牛车河镇) ·Pantang (盘塘镇) ·Qihe (漆河镇) ·Reshi (热市镇) ·Sanyanggang (三阳港镇) ·Shaping (沙坪镇) ·Shuangxikou (双溪口镇) ·Taohuayuan (桃花源镇) ·Xi'an (西安镇) ·Yangxiqiao (杨溪桥镇) ·Yiwangxi (夷望溪镇) ·Zhengjiayi (郑家驿镇) ·Zoushi (陬市镇)
2 townships	Niwotan (泥窝潭乡) ·Shejiaping (佘家坪乡)
2 Hui & Uyghur ethnic townships	Fengshu (枫树维吾尔族回族乡) ·Qinglin (青林回族维吾尔族乡)

== Zhangjiajie City ==
=== Wulingyuan District ===
4 township-level divisions of Wulingyuan District, Zhangjiajie (November 27, 2015 – present)
2 subdistricts	Luoguta (锣鼓塔街道) ·Jundiping (军地坪街道)
2 townships	Xiehe (协合乡) ·Zhonghu (中湖乡)

=== Yongding District ===
20 township-level divisions of Yongding District, Zhangjiajie (November 27, 2015 – present)
6 subdistricts	Chongwen (崇文街道) ·Dayongqiao (大庸桥街道) ·Guanliping (官黎坪街道) ·Nanzhuangping (南庄坪街道) ·Xixiping (西溪坪街道) ·Yongding (永定街道)
7 towns	Jiaoziya (教字垭镇) ·Maoyanhe (茅岩河镇) ·Tianmenshan (天门山镇) ·Wangjiaping (王家坪镇) ·Xinqiao (新桥镇) ·Yinjiaxi (尹家溪镇) ·Yuanguping (沅古坪镇)
7 townships	Hezuoqiao (合作桥乡) ·Luoshui (罗水乡) ·Luotaping (罗塔坪乡) ·Qiaotou (桥头乡) ·Sanjiaguan (三家馆乡) ·Siduping (四都坪乡) ·Xiejiaya (谢家垭乡)

=== Cili County ===
25 township-level divisions of Cili County (November 27, 2015 – present)
15 towns	Dongyueguan (东岳观镇) ·Erfangping (二坊坪镇) ·Gaoqiao (高桥镇) ·Guangfuqiao (广福桥镇) ·Jiangya (江垭镇) ·Lingxi (零溪镇) ·Lingyang (零阳镇) ·Longtanhe (龙潭河镇) ·Miaoshi (苗市镇) ·Sanhekou (三合镇) ·Shamuqiao (杉木桥镇) ·Tongjinpu (通津铺镇) ·Xiangshi (象市镇) ·Xikou (溪口镇) ·Yanbodu (岩泊渡镇)
3 townships	Dongxi (洞溪乡) ·Nanshanping (南山坪乡) ·Yangliupu (杨柳铺乡)
7 Tujia ethnic townships	Ganyan (甘堰土家族乡) ·Gaofeng (高峰土家族乡) ·Jinyan (金岩土家族乡) ·Sanguansi (三官寺土家族乡) ·Xujiafang (许家坊土家族乡) ·Yanghe (阳和土家族乡) ·Zhaojiagang (赵家岗土家族乡)

=== Sangzhi County ===
23 township-level divisions of Sangzhi County (November 27, 2015 – present)
12 towns	Badagongshan (八大公山镇) ·Chenjiahe (陈家河镇) ·Guandiping (官地坪镇) ·Liangshuikou (凉水口镇) ·Liaojiacun (廖家村镇) ·Lifuta (利福塔镇) ·Liyuan (澧源镇) ·Longtanping (龙潭坪镇) ·Qiaoziwan (桥自弯镇) ·Renchaoxi (人潮溪镇) ·Ruitapu (瑞塔铺镇) ·Wudaoshui (五道水镇)
6 townships	Hekou (河口乡) ·Kongkeshu (空壳树乡) ·Shangdongjie (上洞街乡) ·Shanghexi (上河溪乡) ·Shataping (沙塔坪乡) ·Zhuyeping (竹叶坪乡)
5 Bai ethnic townships	Zoumaping (走马坪白族乡) ·Liujiaping (刘家坪白族乡) ·Hongjiaguan (洪家关白族乡) ·Furongqiao (芙蓉桥白族乡) ·Mahekou (马合口白族乡)

== Yiyang City ==
=== Heshan District ===
17 township-level divisions of Heshan District, Yiyang (November 26, 2015 – present)
6 subdistricts	Chaoyang (朝阳街道) ·Heshan (赫山街道) ·Huilongshan (会龙山街道) ·Jinyinshan (金银山街道) ·Taohualun (桃花仑街道) ·Yuxingshan (鱼形山街道)
10 towns	Bazishao (八字哨镇) ·Cangshuipu (沧水铺镇) ·Henglunqiao (衡龙桥镇) ·Lanxi (兰溪镇) ·Nijiangkou (泥江口镇) ·Oujiangcha (欧江岔镇) ·Quanjiaohe (泉交河镇) ·Xielingang (谢林港镇) ·Xinshidu (新市渡镇) ·Yuejiaqiao (岳家桥镇)
1 township	Bijiashan (架山乡)

=== Ziyang District ===
8 township-level divisions of Ziyang District, Yiyang (December, 2005–present)
2 subdistricts	Damatou (大码头街道) ·Qichelu (汽车路街道)
5 towns	Changchun (长春镇) ·Cihukou (茈湖口镇) ·Shaotou (沙头镇) ·Xinqiaohe (新桥河镇) ·Yingfengqiao (迎风桥镇)
1 township	Zhangjiasai (张家塞乡)

=== Yuanjiang City ===
13 township-level divisions of Yuanjiang City (November 26, 2015 – present)
2 subdistricts	Qionghu (琼湖街道) ·Yanzhihu (胭脂湖街道)
11 towns	Caowei (草尾镇) ·Chapanzhou (茶盘洲镇) ·Gonghua (共华镇) ·Huangmaozhou (黄茅洲镇) ·Nandashan (南大膳镇) ·Nanzui (南嘴镇) ·Qianshanhong (千山红镇) ·Sihushan (泗湖山镇) ·Sijihong (四季红镇) ·Xinwan (新湾镇) ·Yangluozhou (阳罗洲镇)

=== Anhua County ===
23 township-level divisions of Anhua County (February 17, 2006 – present)
18 towns	Changtan (长塘镇) ·Dafu (大福镇) ·Dongping (东坪镇) ·Jiangnan (江南镇) ·Kuixi (奎溪镇) ·Le'an (乐安镇) ·Lengshi (冷市镇) ·Malu (马路镇) ·Meicheng (梅城镇) ·Pingkou (平口镇) ·Qingtangpu (清塘铺镇) ·Qujiang (渠江镇) ·Taoxi (滔溪镇) ·Xianxi (仙溪镇) ·Xiaoyan (小淹镇) ·Yangjiaotang (羊角塘镇) ·Yanxi (烟溪镇) ·Zhexi (柘溪镇)
5 townships	Gaoming (高明乡) ·Gulou (古楼乡) ·Longtang (龙塘乡) ·Nanjin (南金乡) ·Tianzhuang (田庄乡)

=== Nan County ===
15 township-level divisions of Nan County (2017 – present)
14 towns	Beizhouzi (北洲子镇) ·Changjiao (厂窖镇) ·Heba (河坝镇) ·Huage (华阁镇) ·Jinpen (金盆镇) ·Langbahu (浪拔湖镇) ·Mahekou (麻河口镇) ·Maocaojie (茅草街镇) ·Mingshantou (明山头镇) ·Nanzhou (南洲镇) ·Qingshuzui (青树嘴镇) ·Sanxianhu (三仙湖镇) ·Wushenggong (武圣宫镇) ·Zhongyukou (中鱼口镇)
1 township	Wuzui (乌嘴乡)

=== Taojiang County ===
15 township-level divisions of Taojiang County (2011–present)
12 towns	Daligang (大栗港镇) ·Huishangang (灰山港镇) ·Lucidu (鸬鹚渡镇) ·Majitang (马迹塘镇) ·Niutian (牛田镇) ·Santangjie (三堂街镇) ·Shiniujiang (石牛江镇) ·Songmutang (松木塘镇) ·Taohuajiang (桃花江镇) ·Wutan (武潭镇) ·Xiushan (修山镇) ·Zhanxi (沾溪镇)
2 townships	Fuqiushan (浮丘山乡) ·Gaoqiao (高桥乡)
1 Hui ethnic township	Zhabu (鲊埠回族乡)

== Chenzhou City ==
=== Beihu District ===
12 township-level divisions of Beihu District, Chenzhou (November 26, 2015 – present)
8 subdistricts	Beihu (北湖街道) ·Chenjiang (郴江街道) ·Luoxian (骆仙街道) ·Renminlu (人民路街道) ·Xiameiqiao (下湄桥街道) ·Yanquan (燕泉街道) ·Yongquan (涌泉街道) ·Zengfu (增福街道)
2 towns	Huatang (华塘镇) ·Lutang (鲁塘镇)
2 Yao ethnic township	Baohe (保和瑶族乡) ·Yangtianhu (仰天湖瑶族乡)

=== Suxian District ===
14 township-level divisions of Suxian District, Chenzhou (November 26, 2015 – present)
6 subdistricts	Bailudong (白鹿洞街道) ·Guanshandong (观山洞街道) ·Nanta (南塔街道) ·Puliping (卜里坪街道) ·Suxianling (苏仙岭街道) ·Wangxianling (王仙岭街道)
8 towns	Aoshang (坳上镇) ·Bailutang (白露塘镇) ·Feitianshan (飞天山镇) ·Liangtian (良田镇) ·Qifengdu (栖凤渡镇) ·Wugaishan (五盖山镇) ·Wulipai (五里牌镇) ·Xujiadong (许家洞镇)

=== Zixing City ===
13 township-level divisions of Zixing City (November 27, 2015 – present)
2 subdistricts	Dongjiang (东江街道) ·Tangdong (唐洞街道)
9 towns	Bailang (白廊镇) ·Chukou (滁口镇) ·Huangcao (黄草镇) ·Liaojiang (蓼江镇) ·Qingjiang (清江镇) ·Sandu (三都镇) ·Tangxi (汤溪镇) ·Xingning (兴宁镇) ·Zhoumensi (州门司镇)
2 Yao ethnic township	Bamianshan (八面山瑶族乡) ·Huilongshan (回龙山瑶族乡)

=== Anren County ===
13 township-level divisions of Anren County (November 27, 2015 – present)
5 towns	Yonglejiang (永乐江镇) ·Longhai (龙海镇) ·Lingguan (灵官镇) ·Ping'an (安平镇) ·Jinzixian (金紫仙镇)
8 townships	Longshi (龙市乡) ·Chengping (承坪乡) ·Dukou (渡口乡) ·Zhushan (竹山乡) ·Yangji (洋际乡) ·Huawang (华王乡) ·Pailou (牌楼乡) ·Pingbei (平背乡)

=== Guidong County ===
11 township-level divisions of Guidong County (November 27, 2015 – present)
7 towns	Datang (大塘镇) ·Oujiang (沤江镇) ·Pule (普乐镇) ·Qingquan (清泉镇) ·Shatian (沙田镇) ·Sidu (四都镇) ·Zhaiqian (寨前镇)
4 townships	Dongluo (东洛乡) ·Qiaotou (桥头乡) ·Qingshan (青山乡) ·Xinfang (新坊乡)

=== Guiyang County ===
22 township-level divisions of Guiyang County (November 27, 2015 – present)
3 subdistricts	Huangshaping (黄沙坪街道) ·Longtan (龙潭街道) ·Lufeng (鹿峰街道)
17 towns	Aoquan (敖泉镇) ·Chonglingjiang (舂陵江镇) ·Fangyuan (方元镇) ·Haotang (浩塘镇) ·Heping (和平镇) ·Heye (荷叶镇) ·Leiping (雷坪镇) ·Liantang (莲塘镇) ·Liufeng (流峰镇) ·Ouyanghai (欧阳海镇) ·Renyi (仁义镇) ·Sili (四里镇) ·Taihe (太和镇) ·Tangshi (塘市镇) ·Yangshi (洋市镇) ·Zhangshi (樟市镇) ·Zhenghe (正和镇)
1 township	Qiaoshi (桥市乡)
1 Yao ethnic township	Baishui (白水瑶族乡)

=== Jiahe County ===
10 township-level divisions of Jiahe County (November 27, 2015 – present)
9 towns	Guangfa (广发镇) ·Jinping (晋屏镇) ·Longtan (龙潭镇) ·Shiqiao (石桥镇) ·Tangcun (塘村镇) ·Tanping (坦坪镇) ·Xinglang (行廊镇) ·Yuanjia (袁家镇) ·Zhuquan (珠泉镇)
1 township	Puman (普满乡)

=== Linwu County ===
13 township-level divisions of Linwu County (November 27, 2015 – present)
9 towns	Chujiang (楚江镇) ·Fenshi (汾市镇) ·Huaxiang (香花镇) ·Jinjiang (金江镇) ·Maishi (麦市镇) ·Nanqiang (南强镇) ·Shuidong (水东镇) ·Shunfeng (舜峰镇) ·Wushui (武水镇)
3 townships	Huatang (花塘乡) ·Wanshui (万水乡) ·Zhennan (镇南乡)
1 Yao ethnic township	Xishan (西山瑶族乡)

=== Rucheng County ===
14 township-level divisions of Rucheng County (November 27, 2015 – present)
9 towns	Daping (大坪镇) ·Jingpo (井坡镇) ·Luyang (卢阳镇) ·Maqiao (马桥镇) ·Nuanshui (暖水镇) ·Quanshui (泉水镇) ·Reshui (热水镇) ·Sanjiangkou (三江口镇) ·Tuqiao (土桥镇)
3 townships	Haotou (濠头乡) ·Jiyi (集益乡) ·Nandong (南洞乡)
2 Yao ethnic townships	Wenming (文明瑶族乡) ·Yanshou (延寿瑶族乡)

=== Yizhang County ===
19 township-level divisions of Yizhang County (November 27, 2015 – present)
14 towns	Baishidu (白石渡镇) ·Bali (笆篱镇) ·Huangsha (黄沙镇) ·Litian (里田镇) ·Liyuan (栗源镇) ·Meitian (梅田镇) ·Tiantang (天塘镇) ·Wuling (五岭镇) ·Yangmeishan (杨梅山镇) ·Yanquan (岩泉镇) ·Yaogangxian (瑶岗仙镇) ·Yiliu (一六镇) ·Yingchun (迎春镇) ·Yuxi (玉溪镇)
4 townships	Changcun (长村乡) ·Chishi (赤石乡) ·Guanxi (关溪乡) ·Jiangshui (浆水乡)
1 Yao ethnic township	Mangshan (莽山瑶族乡)

=== Yongxing County ===
15 township-level divisions of Yongxing County (November 27, 2015 – present)
11 towns	Bianjiang (便江镇) ·Bolin (柏林镇) ·Gaotingsi (高亭司镇) ·Huangni (黄泥镇) ·Jingui (金龟镇) ·Liyutang (鲤鱼塘镇) ·Matian (马田镇) ·Taihe (太和镇) ·Youma (油麻镇) ·Yuelai (悦来镇) ·Zhangshu (樟树镇)
4 townships	Dabujiang (大布江乡) ·Longxingshi (龙形市乡) ·Qijia (七甲乡) ·Yangtang (洋塘乡)

== Yongzhou City ==
=== Lengshuitan District ===
17 township-level divisions of Lengshuitan District, Yongzhou (November 16, 2015 – present)
8 subdistricts	Fenghuang (凤凰街道) ·Lingjiaoshan (菱角山街道) ·Meiwan (梅湾街道) ·Quhe (曲河街道) ·Shanhu (珊瑚街道) ·Wutong (梧桐街道) ·Xiaojiayuan (肖家园街道) ·Yangjiaqiao (杨家桥街道)
8 towns	Caishi (蔡市镇) ·Gaoxishi (高溪市镇) ·Gaoyangsi (黄阳司镇) ·Huaqiaojie (花桥街镇) ·Niujiaoba (牛角坝镇) ·Puliqiao (普利桥镇) ·Shanglingqiao (上岭桥镇) ·Yitang (伊塘镇)
1 township	Yangcundian (杨村甸乡)

=== Lingling District ===
14 township-level divisions of Lingling District, Yongzhou (November 18, 2015 – present)
4 subdistricts	Chaoyang (朝阳街道) ·Nanjindu (南津渡街道) ·Qilidian (七里店街道) ·Xujiajing (徐家井街道)
7 towns	Fujiaqiao (富家桥镇) ·Huangtianpu (黄田铺镇) ·Lingjiaotang (菱角塘镇) ·Shiyantou (石岩头镇) ·Shuikoushan (水口山镇) ·Youtingxu (邮亭墟镇) ·Zhushan (珠山镇)
3 townships	Dangdi (凼底乡) ·Daqingping (大庆坪乡) ·Shuzipu (梳子铺乡)

=== Dao County ===
22 township-level divisions of Dao County (November 16, 2015 – present)
7 subdistricts	Dongmen (东门街道) ·Futang (富塘街道) ·Lianxi (濂溪街道) ·Shangguan (上关街道) ·Wanjiazhuang (万家庄街道) ·Xizhou (西洲街道) ·Yingjiang (营江街道)
11 towns	Baimadu (白马渡镇) ·Baimangpu (白芒铺镇) ·Ganziyuan (柑子园镇) ·Gongba (蚣坝镇) ·Meihua (梅花镇) ·Qiaotou (桥头镇) ·Qingtang (清塘镇) ·Shouyan (寿雁镇) ·Simaqiao (四马桥镇) ·Xianglinpu (祥霖铺镇) ·Xianzijiao (仙子脚镇)
1 township	Lefutang (乐福堂乡)
3 Yao ethnic townships	Hengling (横岭瑶族乡) ·Hongtangying (洪塘营瑶族乡) ·Zhangyitang (审章塘瑶族乡)

=== Dong'an County ===
15 township-level divisions of Dong'an County (November 11, 2015 – present)
13 towns	Baiyashi (白牙市镇) ·Damiaokou (大庙口镇) ·Dasheng (大盛镇) ·Duanqiaopu (端桥铺镇) ·Hengtang (横塘镇) ·Huaqiao (花桥镇) ·Jingtouyu (井头圩镇) ·Luhongshi (芦洪市镇) ·Lumaqiao (鹿马桥镇) ·Nanqiao (南桥镇) ·Shiqishi (石期市镇) ·Xinyujiang (新圩江镇) ·Zixishi (紫溪市镇)
2 townships	Shuiling (水岭乡) ·Shuiyan (川岩乡)

=== Jianghua County ===
16 township-level divisions of Jianghua Yao Autonomous County (November 19, 2015 – present)
9 towns	Baimangying (白芒营镇) ·Centianhe (涔天河镇) ·Dalupu (大路铺镇) ·Dayu (大圩镇) ·Helukou (河路口镇) ·Mashi (码市镇) ·Shuikou (水口镇) ·Taoyu (涛圩镇) ·Tuojiang (沱江镇)
6 townships	Dashiqiao (大石桥乡) ·Daxi (大锡乡) ·Jiepai (界牌乡) ·Qiaoshi (桥市乡) ·Weizhukou (蔚竹口乡) ·Xiangjiang (湘江乡)
1 Zhuang ethnic township	Xiaoyu (小圩壮族乡)

=== Jiangyong County ===
10 township-level divisions of Jiangyong County (November 12, 2015 – present)
6 towns	Cushijiang (粗石江镇) ·Huilongyu (回龙圩镇) ·Shangjiangyu (上江圩镇) ·Taochuan (桃川镇) ·Xiacengpu (夏层铺镇) ·Xiaopu (潇浦镇)
4 Yao ethnic townships	Lanxi (兰溪瑶族乡) ·Qianjiadong (千家峒瑶族乡) ·Songbai (松柏瑶族乡) ·Yuankou (源口瑶族乡)

=== Lanshan County ===
14 township-level divisions of Lanshan County (November 18, 2015 – present)
8 towns	Citangxu (祠堂圩镇) ·Maojun (毛俊镇) ·Nanshi (楠市镇) ·Suocheng (所城镇) ·Tafeng (塔峰镇) ·Taipingxu (太平圩镇) ·Tushi (土市镇) ·Xinyu (新圩镇)
6 Yao ethnic townships	Daqiao (大桥瑶族乡) ·Huiyuan (汇源瑶族乡) ·Jiangdong (浆洞瑶族乡) ·Jingzhu (荆竹瑶族乡) ·Litou (犁头瑶族乡) ·Xiangjiangyuan (湘江源瑶族乡)

=== Ningyuan County ===
20 township-level divisions of Ningyuan County (May 8, 2015 – present)
4 subdistricts	Dongxi (东溪街道) ·Shunling (舜陵街道) ·Tongshan (桐山街道) ·Wenmiao (文庙街道)
12 towns	Baijiaping (柏家坪镇) ·Bao'an (保安镇) ·Heting (禾亭镇) ·Lengshui (冷水镇) ·Lixi (鲤溪镇) ·Qingshuiqiao (清水桥镇) ·Renhe (仁和镇) ·Shuishi (水市镇) ·Taiping (太平镇) ·Tiantang (天堂镇) ·Wanjing (湾井镇) ·Zhonghe (中和镇)
4 Yao ethnic townships	Jiuyishan (九嶷山瑶族乡/九疑山瑶族乡) ·Mianhuaping (棉花坪瑶族乡) ·Tongmuluo (桐木漯瑶族乡) ·Wulongshan (五龙山瑶族乡)

=== Qiyang County ===
26 township-level divisions of Qiyang County (November 11, 2015 – present)
3 subdistricts	Changhong (长虹街道) ·Longshan (龙山街道) ·Wuxi (浯溪街道)
20 towns	Babao (八宝镇) ·Baishui (白水镇) ·Dacundian (大村甸镇) ·Dazhongqiao (大忠桥镇) ·Gongjiaping (龚家坪镇) ·Guanyinshan (观音滩镇) ·Huangnitang (黄泥塘镇) ·Jinbaotang (进宝塘镇) ·Jindong (金洞镇) ·Lijiaping (黎家坪镇) ·Maozhu (茅竹镇) ·Meixi (梅溪镇) ·Panshi (潘市镇) ·Qiliqiao (七里桥镇) ·Sankoutang (三口塘镇) ·Wenfu (文富镇) ·Wenmingpu (文明铺镇) ·Xiamadu (下马渡镇) ·Xiaojia (肖家镇) ·Yangjiaotang (羊角塘镇)
2 townships	Fenghuang (凤凰乡) ·Shiguyuan (石鼓源乡)
1 Yao ethnic township	Shaibeitan (晒北滩瑶族乡)

=== Shuangpai County ===
11 township-level divisions of Shuangpai County (November 18, 2015 – present)
6 towns	Chalin (茶林镇) ·Hejiadong (何家洞镇) ·Jiangcun (江村镇) ·Majiang (麻江镇) ·Shuangbo (泷泊镇) ·Wulipai (五里牌镇)
4 townships	Daguping (打鼓坪乡) ·Lijiaping (理家坪乡) ·Tangdi (塘底乡) ·Wuxingling (五星岭乡)
1 Yao ethnic township	Shangwujiang (上梧江瑶族乡)

=== Xintian County ===
12 township-level divisions of Xintian County (November 20, 2015 – present)
11 towns	Dapingtang (大坪塘镇) ·Jiantou (枧头镇) ·Jicun (骥村镇) ·Jinling (金陵镇) ·Jinpen (金盆镇) ·Longquan (龙泉镇) ·Sanjing (三井镇) ·Shiyang (石羊镇) ·Taoling (陶岭镇) ·Xinlong (新隆镇) ·Xinxu (新圩镇)
1 Yao ethnic township	Menlouxia (门楼下瑶族乡)

== Huaihua City ==
=== Hecheng District ===
10 township-level divisions of Hecheng District, Huaihua (November 25, 2015 – present)
7 subdistricts	Chengbei (城北街道) ·Chengnan (城南街道) ·Chengxi (河西街道) ·Chengzhong (城中街道) ·Hongxing (红星街道) ·Tuoyuan (坨院街道) ·Yingfeng (迎丰街道)
1 town	Huangjin'ao (黄金坳镇)
2 townships	Liangting'ao (凉亭坳乡) ·Yingkou (盈口乡)

=== Hongjiang City ===
24 township-level divisions of Hongjiang City (November 25, 2015 – present)
7 towns	Anjiang (安江镇) ·Jiangshi (江市镇) ·Qiancheng (黔城镇) ·Tangwan (塘湾镇) ·Tuokou (托口镇) ·Xuefeng (雪峰镇) ·Yuanhe (沅河镇)
11 townships	Chatou (岔头乡) ·Dachong (大崇乡) ·Maodu (茅渡乡) ·Qunfeng (群峰乡) ·Shanwan (沙湾乡) ·Shuping (熟坪乡) ·Taiping (太平乡) ·Tieshan (铁山乡) ·Wanxi (湾溪乡) ·Xima (洗马乡) ·Yanlong (岩垅乡)
Hongjiang District	Gaopojie (高坡街街道) ·Hebinlu (河滨路街道) ·Xinjie (新街街道) ·Yuanjianglu (沅江路街道) ·Guihuayuan (桂花园乡) ·Hengyan (横岩乡)

=== Chenxi County ===
23 township-level divisions of Chenxi County (November 19, 2015 – present)
9 towns	Anping (安坪镇) ·Chenyang (辰阳镇) ·Huangkouxi (黄溪口镇) ·Huomachong (火马冲镇) ·Jinbin (锦滨镇) ·Tanwan (潭湾镇) ·Tianwan (田湾镇) ·Xiaoping (孝坪镇) ·Xiuxi (修溪镇)
9 townships	Changtianwan (长田湾乡) ·Chuanxi (船溪乡) ·Dashuitian (大水田乡) ·Longchuanyan (龙泉岩乡) ·Longtou'an (龙头庵乡) ·Qiaotouxi (桥头溪乡) ·Shixi (柿溪乡) ·Tanjiachang (谭家场乡) ·Xiaolongmen (小龙门乡)
5 Yao ethnic townships	Houtang (后塘瑶族乡) ·Luozishan (罗子山瑶族乡) ·Shangpuxi (上蒲溪瑶族乡) ·Sumuxi (苏木溪瑶族乡) ·Xianrenwan (仙人湾瑶族乡)

=== Huitong County ===
18 township-level divisions of Huitong County (November 19, 2015 – present)
8 towns	Baozi (堡子镇) ·Guangping (广坪镇) ·Jinzhu (金竹镇) ·Lincheng (林城镇) ·Ma'an (马鞍镇) ·Pingcun (坪村镇) ·Ruoshui (若水镇) ·Tuanhe (团河镇)
4 townships	Diling (地灵乡) ·Gaoyi (高椅乡) ·Liansha (连山乡) ·Shaxi (沙溪乡)
6 ethnic townships	Baotian (宝田侗族苗族乡) ·Jinziyan (金子岩侗族苗族乡) ·Mobin (漠滨侗族苗族乡) ·Paotuan (炮团侗族苗族乡) ·Puwen (蒲稳侗族苗族乡) ·Qinglang (青朗侗族苗族乡)

=== Jingzhou County ===
11 township-level divisions of Jingzhou Miao and Dong Autonomous County (November 25, 2015 – present)
6 towns	Aoshang (坳上镇) · Dabaozi (大堡子镇) · Gantang (甘棠镇) · Pingcha (平茶镇) · Quyang (渠阳镇) · Xinchang (新厂镇)
5 townships	Outuan (藕团乡) · Sanqiao (三锹乡) · Taiyangping (太阳坪乡) · Wenxi (文溪乡) · Zhaiya (寨牙乡)

=== Mayang County ===
18 township-level divisions of Mayang Miao Autonomous County (November 25, 2015 – present)
7 towns	Gaocun (高村镇) · Jiangkouxu (江口墟镇) · Jinhe (锦和镇) · Lanli (兰里镇) · Lüjiaping (吕家坪镇) · Yanmen (岩门镇) · Yaoshi (尧市镇)
11 townships	Banlishu (板栗树乡) · Daqiaojiang (大桥江乡) · Guogongping (郭公坪乡) · Hepingxi (和平溪乡) · Lancun (兰村乡) · Longjiabao (隆家堡乡) · Shiyangshao (石羊哨乡) · Shujiacun (舒家村乡) · Tanjiazhai (谭家寨乡) · Wenchange (文昌阁乡) · Huangsang (黄桑乡)

=== Tongdao County ===
11 township-level divisions of Tongdao Dong Autonomous County (November 25, 2015 – present)
8 towns	Boyang (播阳镇) · Jingwuzhou (菁芜洲镇) · Longcheng (陇城镇) · Shuangjiang (双江镇) · Wanfoshan (万佛山镇) · Xianxi (县溪镇) · Xikou (溪口镇) · Yatunbao (牙屯堡镇)
2 townships	Dupo (独坡乡) · Pingtan (坪坦乡)
1 Miao ethnic township	Dagaoping (大高坪苗族乡)

=== Xinhuang County ===
11 township-level divisions of Xinhuang Dong Autonomous County (November 19, 2015 – present)
9 towns	Bozhou (波洲镇) · Fuluo (扶罗镇) · Gongxi (贡溪镇) · Hetan (禾滩镇) · Huangzhou (晃州镇) · Liangsan (凉伞镇) · Linchong (林冲镇) · Yushi (鱼市镇) · Zhongzhai (中寨镇)
2 Miao ethnic townships	Butouxiang (步头降苗族乡) · Miba (米贝苗族乡)

=== Xupu County ===
25 township-level divisions of Xupu County (November 19, 2015 – present)
18 towns	Beidouxi (北斗溪镇) · Dajiangkou (大江口镇) · Dizhuang (低庄镇) · Gezhuping (葛竹坪镇) · Guanjin (双井镇) · Guanyinge (观音阁镇) · Huangmaoyuan (黄茅园镇) · Junping (均坪镇) · Liangyaping (两丫坪镇) · Longtan (龙潭镇) · Lufeng (卢峰镇) · Qiaojiang (桥江镇) · Sanjiang (三江镇) · Shenzihu (深子湖镇) · Shuidong (水东镇) · Simeng (思蒙镇) · Tongxihe (统溪河镇) · Zushidian (祖师殿镇)
7 townships	Longzhuangwan (龙庄湾乡) · Shurongxi (舒溶溪乡) · Taojinping (淘金坪乡) · Xiaohenglong (小横垅乡) · Yanxi (沿溪乡) · Youyang (油洋乡) · Zhongdu (中都乡)

=== Yuanling County ===
21 township-level divisions of Yuanling County (November 26, 2015 – present)
8 towns	Guanzhuang (官庄镇) · Liangshuijing (凉水井镇) · Liangshuijing (凉水井镇) · Mingxikou (明溪口镇) · Qijiaping (七甲坪镇) · Shaojiwan (筲箕湾镇) · Wuqiangxi (五强溪镇) · Yuanling (沅陵镇)
11 townships	Beirong (北溶乡) · Chenjiatan (陈家滩乡) · Daheping (大合坪乡) · Dujiaping (杜家坪乡) · Jiemuxi (借母溪乡) · Lixi (荔溪乡) · Madiyi (马底驿乡) · Nanmupu (楠木铺乡) · Pangu (盘古乡) · Qinglang (清浪乡) · Xiaojiaqiao (肖家桥乡)
2 ethnic townships	Eryou (二酉苗族乡) · Huochang (火场土家族乡)

=== Zhijiang County ===
18 township-level divisions of Zhijiang Dong Autonomous County (November 25, 2015 – present)
9 towns	Biyong (碧涌镇) · Gongping (公坪镇) · Luojiu (罗旧镇) · Nanmuping (楠木坪镇) · Sandaokeng (三道坑镇) · Tuqiao (土桥镇) · Xindianping (新店坪镇) · Yanqiao (岩桥镇) · Zhijiang (芷江镇)
9 townships	Dashu'ao (大树坳乡) · Dongxiachang (洞下场乡) · Heli'ao (禾梨坳乡) · Lengshuixi (冷水溪乡) · Lixikou (梨溪口乡) · Luobutian (罗卜田乡) · Niuguping (牛牯坪乡) · Shuikuan (水宽乡) · Xiaoping (晓坪乡)

=== Zhongfang County ===
10 township-level divisions of Zhongfang County (November 24, 2015 – present)
9 towns	Huaqiao (花桥镇) · Jielong (接龙镇) · Luyang (泸阳镇) · Tiepo (铁坡镇) · Tongding (铜鼎镇) · Tongmu (桐木镇) · Tongwan (铜湾镇) · Xinjian (新建镇) · Xinluhe (新路河镇) · Yuanjia (袁家镇) · Zhongfang (中方镇)
1 Yao ethnic township	Haojiping (蒿吉坪瑶族乡)

== Loudi City ==
=== Louxing District ===
13 township-level divisions of Louxing District, Loudi (November 23, 2015 – present)
7 subdistricts	Changqing (长青街道) · Dabuqiao (大埠桥街道) · Dake (大科街道) · Huangnitang (黄泥塘街道) · Huashan (花山街道) · Leping (乐坪街道) · Lianbin (涟滨街道)
5 towns	Shanshan (杉山镇) · Shexingshan (蛇形山镇) · Shijing (石井镇) · Shuidongdi (水洞底镇) · Wanbao (万宝镇)
1 township	Shuangjiang (双江乡)

=== Lengshuijiang City ===
10 township-level divisions of Lengshuijiang City (November 23, 2015 – present)
4 subdistricts	Buxi (布溪街道) · Lengshuijiang (冷水江街道) · Shatangwan (沙塘湾街道) · Xikuangshan (锡矿山街道)
5 towns	Duoshan (铎山镇) · Heqing (禾青镇) · Jinzhushan (金竹山镇) · Sanjian (三尖镇) · Zhadu (渣渡镇)
1 township	Zhonglian (中连乡)

=== Lianyuan City ===
19 township-level divisions of Lianyuan City (January 24, 2017 – present)
1 subdistrict	Lantian (蓝田街道)
16 towns	Anping (安平镇) · Baima (白马镇) · Doulishan (斗笠山镇) · Dutoutang (渡头塘镇) · Fengping (枫坪镇) · Fukou (伏口镇) · Hetang (荷塘镇) · Jinshi (金石镇) · Liumutang (六亩塘镇) · Longtang (龙塘镇) · Maotang (茅塘镇) · Meijiang (湄江镇) · Qiaotouhe (桥头河镇) · Qixingjie (七星街镇) · Shimashan (石马山镇) · Yangshi (杨市镇)
2 townships	Gutang (古塘乡) · Sanjia (三甲乡)

=== Shuangfeng County ===
15 township-level divisions of Shuangfeng County (January 24, 2017 – present)
12 towns	Gantang (甘棠镇) · Heye (荷叶镇) · Hongshandian (洪山殿镇) · Huamen (花门镇) · Jingzi (井字镇) · Qingshuping (青树坪镇) · Santangpu (三塘铺镇) · Suoshi (锁石镇) · Xingzipu (杏子铺镇) · Yongfeng (永丰镇) · Zimenqiao (梓门桥镇) · Zoumajie (走马街镇)
3 townships	Shatang (沙塘乡) · Shiniu (石牛乡) · Yintang (印塘乡)

=== Xinhua County ===
28 township-level divisions of Xinhua County (November 6, 2017 – present)
3 towns	Fenglin (枫林街道) · Shangdu (上渡街道) · Shangmei (上梅街道)
18 towns	Baixi (白溪镇) ·Caojia (曹家镇) ·Chaxi (槎溪镇) ·Fengjia (奉家镇) ·Jiqing (吉庆镇) ·Langtang (琅塘镇) ·Luguan (炉观镇) ·Menggong (孟公镇) ·Sangzi (桑梓镇) ·Shangmei (上梅镇) ·Shichongkou (石冲口镇) ·Shuiche (水车镇) ·Tianping (田坪镇) ·Wentang (温塘镇) ·Wentian (文田镇) ·Xihe (西河镇) ·Yangxi (洋溪镇) ·Youjia (游家镇) ·Zhenshang (圳上镇)
7 townships	Jinfeng Township (金凤乡) ·Ketou Township (科头乡) ·Ronghua Township (荣华乡) ·Tianmen Township (天门乡) ·Weishan Township (维山乡) ·Youxi Township (油溪乡) ·Zuoshi Township (坐石乡)

== Xiangxi Tujia and Miao Autonomous Prefecture ==
=== Jishou City ===
10 township-level divisions of Jishou City (November 30, 2015 – present)
4 subdistricts	Donghe (峒河街道) · Jifeng (吉凤街道) · Qianzhou (乾州街道) · Zhenxi (镇溪街道)
5 towns	Aizhai (矮寨镇) · Danqing (丹青镇) · Hexi (河溪镇) · Majing'ao (马颈坳镇) · Taiping (太平镇)
1 township	Yilue (已略乡)

=== Baojing County ===
12 township-level divisions of Baojing County (November 27, 2015 – present)
10 towns	Bi'er (比耳镇) ·Fuxing (复兴镇) ·Hulu (葫芦镇) ·Lüdongshan (吕洞山镇) ·Maogou (毛沟镇) ·Purong (普戎镇) ·Qianling (迁陵镇) ·Qingshuiping (清水坪镇) ·Shuitianhe (水田河镇) ·Wanmipo (碗米坡镇)
2 townships	Changtanhe (长潭河乡) ·Yangchao (阳朝乡)

=== Fenghuang County ===
17 township-level divisions of Fenghuang County (November 30, 2015 – present)
13 towns	Alaying (阿拉营镇) ·Chatian (茶田镇) ·Ganziping (竿子坪镇) ·Heku (禾库镇) ·Jixin (吉信镇) ·La'ershan (腊尔山镇) ·Liaojiaqiao (廖家桥镇) ·Luochaojing (落潮井镇) ·Mujiangping (木江坪镇) ·Qiangongping (千工坪镇) ·Shanjiang (山江镇) ·Tuojiang (沱江镇) ·Xinchang (新场镇)
4 townships	Dashuitian (水打田乡) ·Lianglin (两林乡) ·Linfeng (林峰乡) ·Machong (麻冲乡)

=== Guzhang County ===
7 township-level divisions of Guzhang County (November 30, 2015 – present)
7 towns	Duanlongshan (断龙山镇) ·Gaofeng (高峰镇) ·Guyang (古阳镇) ·Hongshilin (红石林镇) ·Morong (默戎镇) ·Pingba (坪坝镇) ·Yantouzhai (岩头寨镇)

=== Huayuan County ===
12 township-level divisions of Huayuan County (November 30, 2015 – present)
9 towns	Biancheng (边城镇) ·Huayuan (花垣镇) ·Jiwei (吉卫镇) ·Longtan (龙潭镇) ·Malichang (麻栗场镇) ·Minle (民乐镇) ·Shilan (石栏镇) ·Shuanglong (双龙镇) ·Yayou (雅酉镇)
3 townships	·Buchou (补抽乡) ·Changle (长乐乡) ·Mao'er (猫儿乡)

=== Longshan County ===
21 township-level divisions of Longshan County (November 30, 2015 – present)
4 subdistricts	Huatang (华塘街道) ·Min'an (民安街道) ·Shigao (石羔街道) ·Xinglong (兴隆街道)
12 towns	Ciyantang (茨岩塘镇) ·Dianfang (靛房镇) ·Guitang (桂塘镇) ·Hongyanxi (红岩溪镇) ·Liye (里耶镇) ·Miao'ertan (苗儿滩镇) ·Nongchezhen (农车镇) ·Shipai (石牌镇) ·Shuitianba (水田坝镇) ·Xichehe (洗车河镇) ·Xiluo (洗洛镇) ·Zhaoshi (召市镇)
5 townships	Da'an (大安乡) ·Luota (洛塔乡) ·Maoping (茅坪乡) ·Neixi (内溪乡) ·Zaguo (咱果乡)

=== Luxi County ===
11 township-level divisions of Luxi County (November 30, 2015 – present)
7 towns	Dalan (达岚镇) ·Heshui (合水镇) ·Pushi (浦市镇) ·Tanxi (潭溪镇) ·Wuxi (武溪镇) ·Xinglongchang (兴隆场镇) ·Xixi (洗溪镇)
4 townships	Baiyangxi (白羊溪乡) ·Jiefangyan (解放岩乡) ·Shiliuping (石榴坪乡) ·Xiaozhang (小章乡)

=== Yongshun County ===
23 township-level divisions of Yongshun County (November 30, 2015 – present)
12 towns	Furong (芙蓉镇) ·Lingxi (灵溪镇) ·Qingping (青坪镇) ·Shaba (砂坝镇) ·Shiti (石堤镇) ·Shouche (首车镇) ·Songbai (松柏镇) ·Tawo (塔卧镇) ·Wanping (万坪镇) ·Xiaoxi (小溪镇) ·Yongmao (永茂镇) ·Zejia (泽家镇)
11 townships	Cheping (车坪乡) ·Duishan (对山乡) ·Gaoping (高坪乡) ·Kesha (颗砂乡) ·Langxi (朗溪乡) ·Liangcha (两岔乡) ·Maoba (毛坝乡) ·Runya (润雅乡) ·Wanmin (万民乡) ·Xiqi (西歧乡) ·Yanjing (盐井乡)
