= Zhou Ping =

Zhou Ping or Zhouping may refer to:

- King Ping of Zhou or Zhou Ping Wang (died 720 BC), king of the Zhou dynasty
- Zhou Ping (gymnast) (born 1968), Chinese gymnast
- Zhouping, Zhuzhou, a township in Hunan Province, China
- Zhouping Xin (fl. 1988–2004), Chinese mathematician

== See also ==
- Ping Zhou (researcher), researcher with ANSYS
- Zhou Pingjian (fl. 2016), Chinese ambassador to Nigeria
