= Zhuanqiao, Zhuzhou =

Zhuanqiao Township
- Township

Chinese transcription(s)
  - Simplified: 砖桥乡
  - Traditional: 磚橋鄉
  - Pinyin: Zhuanqian Xiang
- Location in China
- Coordinates: 27°23′52″N 113°07′18″E
- Country: People's Republic of China
- Province: Hunan
- City: Zhuzhou
- County: Zhuzhou County

Area
  - Total: 58.12 km^{2} (22.44 sq mi)

Population
  - Total: 12,156
  - Density: 209.2/km^{2} (541.7/sq mi)
- Time zone: UTC+8 (China Standard)
- Area code: 0733

Zhuanqiao Township (simplified Chinese: 砖桥乡; traditional Chinese: 磚橋鄉; pinyin: Zhuanqian Xiang) is a traditional rural township in Zhuzhou County, Zhuzhou City, Hunan Province, People's Republic of China.

== Cityscape ==
The township is divided into 13 villages in the following areas: Miaowan Village, Zhuqian Village, Taitian Village, Quchi Village, Tiesha Village, Maji Village, Xichong Village, Huatian Village, Chuanshi Village, Shishuang Village, Wenjia Village, Shanmuqiao Village, and Lannichong Village (庙湾村、诸前村、太田村、曲尺村、铁沙村、马迹村、西冲村、花田村、川石村、石双村、文家村、杉木桥村、烂泥冲村).
