= Pingshan, Zhuzhou =

Township in Hunan, People's Republic of China

Coordinates: 27.4237°N 113.0976°E

Pingshan Township (simplified Chinese: 平山乡; traditional Chinese: 平山鄉; pinyin: Píngshān Xiāng), is a rural township in Zhuzhou County, Zhuzhou City, Hunan Province, People's Republic of China.

== Cityscape ==
The township is divided into 9 villages and 1 community including Pingshan Community, Pingshan Village, Xingqiao Village, Guanfang Village, Quantanghu Village, Longtan Village, Baiyu Village, Huashi Village, Hongshi Village, and Huangnitang Village.
