= Longfeng, Zhuzhou =

Township in Hunan, People's Republic of China

Coordinates: 27.2739°N 113.0906°E

Longfeng Township (simplified Chinese: 龙凤乡; traditional Chinese: 龍鳳鄉; pinyin: Longfeng Xiang), is a rural township in Zhuzhou County, Zhuzhou City, Hunan Province, People's Republic of China.

== Cityscape ==
The township is divided into 13 villages, the following areas: Longfeng Village, Changyuan Village, Shengtian Village, Tiantaisi Village, Xingtai Village, Tianshi Village, Zhongtian Village, Maotang Village, Sifang Village, Shantian Village, Jinfu Village, Lima Village, and Fuchong Village.
