= Dahetang Subdistrict =

Subdistrict in Shaodong, Shaoyang, Hunan, China

Coordinates: 27°16′2.6″N 111°47′22.6″E

Dahetang (Chinese: 大禾塘街道; pinyin: Dàhétáng Jiēdào) is a subdistrict and the seat of Shaodong County in Hunan, China. It was one of three subdistricts established in 2010, when the former Liangshi Town (Chinese: 两市镇) was divided into three subdistricts, it ceased to be a separate town. The Subdistrict was reorganized through the amalgamation of Huangpiqiao Township (Chinese: 黄陂桥乡) and the former Dahetang Subdistrict on December 2, 2015.

It is located in the central Shaodong County. The subdistrict is bordered by Heitianpu (Chinese: 黑田铺镇), Lianqiao (Chinese: 廉桥镇) and Niumasi (Chinese: 牛马司镇) towns to the north, Liuze Town (Chinese: 流泽镇) to the east, Zhouguanqiao Township (Chinese: 周官桥乡) and Liangshitang Subdistrict (Chinese: 两市塘街道) to the south, and Songjiatang Subdistrict (Chinese: 宋家塘街道) to the west. The subdistrict has an area of 56.94 km^{2} (21.98 sq mi) with a population of 106,100 (as of 2015). Dahetang was divided into 38 villages and 12 communities in 2015. Its seat is Huangpiqiao Village (Chinese: 黄陂桥村).
