= Taochuan =

Taochuan may refer to the following places in China:

- Taochuan, Hunan
- Taochuan, Shaanxi
