= Aoshang =

Aoshang, may refer to:

- Aoshang (Chenzhou), an urban town in Suxian District of Chenzhou, Hunan, China
- Aoshang (Jingzhou County), a rural town in Jingzhou Miao and Dong Autonomous County, Hunan, China
