= Nanzhou, Zhuzhou =

Town of Zhuzhou County, Hunan, China

Coordinates: 27.6342°N 113.1674°E

Nanzhou (Chinese: 南洲镇; pinyin: Nánzhōu Zhèn) is a town of Zhuzhou County, Hunan, China. Amalgamating the former two townships of Nanyangqiao and Zhouping, the town was established on November 26, 2015. It has an area of 136.62 km^{2} (52.75 sq mi). As of the end of 2015, its population is 50,800. The town is divided into 19 villages and a community, and its administrative centre is Nanzhou Village (南洲村).

== Subdivisions ==
Administrative Divisions of Nanzhou Town (2016 - present)
Current divisions		Adjustment of administrative divisions in 2016	
English names	Chinese names	English	Chinese
Zhaoling Community	昭陵社区		
Beizhou Village	北洲村	merging the former Qingshuitang and Beiping villages	原清水塘村和北坪村合并
Daguan Village	大观村	merging the former Xiashi and Daguan villages	原霞石村和大观村合并
Hengjiang Village	横江村	merging the former Hengjiang and Tiexi villages	原横江村和铁西村合并
Hetang Village	荷塘村	merging the former Hetang and Nongkezhan villages	原荷塘村和农科站村合并
Hongqiao Village	洪桥村	merging the former Honglong and Wujiaqiao villages	原洪垅村和五架桥村合并
Hongxin Village	红星村	merging the former Shenxialong and Zhoujiabu villages	原神霞垅村和周家埠村合并
Jiangbian Village	江边村	merging the former Jiangbian and Caihuaqiao villages	原江边村和菜花桥村合并
Jiangjun Village	将军村	merging the former Jiangjun and Wushilong villages	原将军村和和乌石垅村合并
Majiawan Village	马家湾村	merging the former Majiawan and Nanyanchong villages	原南烟冲村和马家湾村合并
Nan'an Village	南岸村		
Nanshan Village	南山村	merging the former Tongshan and Nanyangqiao villages	原桐山村和南阳桥村合并
Nanzhou Village	南洲村	merging the former Jianzuowan and Yuanjiazhou villages	原建佐湾村和袁家洲村合并
Shibanqiao Village	石板桥村	merging the former Shibanqiao and Xiqueqiao villages	原石板桥村和喜鹊桥村合并
Sima Village	泗马村	merging the former Sizhouzhan and Mazhou villages	原泗洲站村和马洲村合并
Tianjiawan Village	田家湾村	merging the former Tianjiachong and Xujiawan villages	原田家冲村和许家湾村合并
Xiangdong Village	湘东村	merging the former Zhuji and Chengtang villages	原竹基村和城塘村合并
Xianglu Village	湘渌村	merging the former Dabaqiao and Sanwangchong villages	原大坝桥村和三望冲村合并
Zaohe Village	早竹村	merging the former Zaohe and Zhuyuanchong villages	原早禾冲村和竹园冲村合并
Zhaoling Village	昭陵村	merging the former Zhaoling and Wuyashan villages	原昭陵村和乌鸦山村合并
