= Tawo =

Town in Hunan, China

Tawo 塔卧镇
- Town
- Location in Hunan
- Coordinates: 29°11′41″N 109°57′28″E
- Country: People's Republic of China
- Province: Hunan
- Autonomous prefecture: Xiangxi
- County: Yongshun
- Time zone: UTC+8 (China Standard)

Tawo is a small town in the north west Hunan province of China.

== See also ==
- List of township-level divisions of Hunan
