= Beirong Township =

Beirong Township 北溶乡
- Township
- Location in Hunan
- Coordinates: 28°38′37″N 110°29′47″E
- Country: People's Republic of China
- Province: Hunan
- Prefecture-level city: Huaihua
- County: Yuanling County
- Time zone: UTC+8 (China Standard)

Beirong Township (simplified Chinese: 北溶乡; traditional Chinese: 北溶鄉; pinyin: Běiróng Xiāng) is a township of Yuanling County, Hunan, China. As of 2020, it administers the following fourteen villages:

- Yangjiatan Village (杨家潭村)
- Banzhuxi Village (斑竹溪村)
- Luoping Village (落坪村)
- Tanmingtou Village (覃明头村)
- Jiaokou Village (蛟口村)
- Daqikou Village (大淇口村)
- Sanba Village (三八村)
- Zhangchaoya Village (张朝垭村)
- Zhuhongxi Village (朱红溪村)
- Dongshangping Village (洞上坪村)
- Jietan Village (碣滩村)
- Dongshanxi Village (董山溪村)
- Zhuya Village (竹垭村)
- Tongxilang Village (桐溪浪村)

== See also ==
- List of township-level divisions of Hunan
