= Niumasi Town =

Town in Shaodong, Shaoyang, China

Coordinates: 27°16′20″N 111°40′17″E

Niumasi Town (simplified Chinese: 牛马司镇; traditional Chinese: 牛馬司鎮; pinyin: Niúmǎsī Zhèn) is a township-level administrative unit under the jurisdiction of Shaodong County-level City, Shaoyang Prefecture-level City, Hunan Province, the People's Republic of China. It is located northwest of Shaodong City. The total area is 81.64 square kilometers, with a population of 79,331 people.

== Administrative division ==
Niumasi Town has jurisdiction over the following sub-areas:

- Sanhuai Community (simplified Chinese: 三槐社区; traditional Chinese: 三槐社區),
- Guangrong Village (光荣村; 光榮村),
- Mingliang Village (明亮村),
- Xiajiang Village (硖江村; 硤江村),
- Hongmo Village (宏模村; 宏模村),
- Gongnong Village (工农村; 工農村),
- Niumasi Village (牛马司村; 牛馬司村),
- Sujiang Village (苏江村; 蘇江村),
- Wannidu Village (湾泥渡村; 灣泥渡村),
- Sanshang Village (三尚村),
- Renmin Village (人民村; 人民村),
- Shunli Village (顺利村; 順利村),
- Fengjiangdu Village (封江渡村),
- Lianchi Village (莲池村; 蓮池村),
- Weixing Village (卫星村; 衛星村),
- Pojiang Village (坡江村; 坡江村),
- Shuijingtou Village (水井头村; 水井頭村),
- Xiaoqiao Village (小桥村; 小橋村),
- Yuehua Village (跃华村; 躍華村),
- Xinqiao Village (新桥村; 新橋村),
- Liuqiao Village (柳桥村; 柳橋村),
- Yangliu Village (杨柳村; 楊柳村),
- Sanhuai Village (三槐村),
- Tongmu Village (桐木村),
- Yapotian Village (鸭婆田村; 鴨婆田村),
- Mayuan Village (麻元村),
- Xinjian Village (新建村),
- Guniu Village (牯牛村),
- Tiepu Village (铁铺村; 鐵鋪村),
- Huxingshan Village (虎形山村),
- Xiaoshuichong Village (晓水冲村; 曉水沖村),
- Lutang Village (芦塘村; 蘆塘村).

== Transportation ==
The G320 National Highway, Lou-shao Railway and Tan-shao Expressway pass through the town. Shaoshui River meanders through the territory.

== Niumasi Coal Mine ==
Niumasi Coal Mine (simplified Chinese: 牛马司煤矿; traditional Chinese: 牛馬司煤礦), now also called Niumasi Mining Co., Ltd. (牛马司矿业有限公司; 牛馬司礦業有限公司), is located in the territory of Niewmasi Town. It is a county-level enterprise run by the provincial government.

== See also ==
- Shaodong
- Shaoyang
- Lianqiao Town
- List of township-level divisions of Hunan
