= Anyu Township, Hunan =

Anyu Township 安裕乡
- Township
- Anyuxiang
- Location in Hunan
- Coordinates: 29°23′31″N 112°5′51″E
- Country: China
- Province: Hunan
- Prefecture: Changde
- County-level city: Anxiang

Area
  - Total: 50.78 km^{2} (19.61 sq mi)

Population (2010)
  - Total: 17,806
  - Density: 350.6/km^{2} (908.2/sq mi)

Anyu Township (Chinese: 安裕乡) is a township situated along a tributary stemming from the Lishui River in Anxiang County, Changde, Hunan, China. Anyu Township has a population of 17,806; 9,118 males and 8,688 females and an age structure of: 2,011 aged under 14, 13,385 aged 15 to 64 and 2,410 aged over 65 years old.

== Villages ==
Anyu Township has jurisdiction over the following villages:

- Qiangkou Village
- Shuangzhankou Village
- Xinhekou Village
- Wuyang Village
- Yifenju Village
- Tongqing Village
- Sanzui Village
- Wuyi Village
- Huaixi Village
- Youxin Village
- Hauifu Village

== See also ==
- List of township-level divisions of Hunan
