= Tangshi, Zhuzhou =

Township in Hunan, People's Republic of China

Coordinates: 27°30′06″N 113°07′44″E

Tangshi Township (simplified Chinese: 堂市乡; traditional Chinese: 堂市鄉; pinyin: Tangshi Xiang), is a rural township in Zhuzhou County, Zhuzhou City, Hunan Province, People's Republic of China.

== Cityscape ==
The township is divided into 17 villages, the following areas: Tangshi Village, Bantang Village, Jinhua Village, Louxia Village, Jitou Village, Dalong Village, Longquan Village, Wugong Village, Paitang Village, Tucheng Village, Damiaoqian Village, Huangzhu Village, Hutang Village, Chengbei Village, Yingchun Village, Taishuitian Village, and Xinhe Village (堂市村、板塘村、金华村、楼下村、矶头村、大垄村、龙泉村、蜈蚣村、排塘村、土城村、大庙前村、黄竹村、湖塘村、城背村、迎春村、太水田村、新和村).
