= Lancun Township, Hunan =

Lancun Township 兰村乡
- Township
- Location in Hunan
- Coordinates: 27°48′36″N 109°49′21″E
- Country: People's Republic of China
- Province: Hunan
- Prefecture-level city: Huaihua
- Autonomous County: Mayang Miao Autonomous County
- Time zone: UTC+8 (China Standard)

Lancun Township (simplified Chinese: 兰村乡; traditional Chinese: 蘭村鄉; pinyin: láncūn Xiāng) is a township under the administration of Mayang Miao Autonomous County, Hunan, China. As of 2020, it administers the following 10 villages:

- Lancun Village
- Yanshancha Village (岩山岔村)
- Tonggulong Village (桐古垅村)
- Longtian Village (垅田村)
- Jiaolin Village (椒林村)
- Da'ao Village (大坳村)
- Wangyuan Village (望远村)
- Yan'ao Village (岩坳村)
- Longpan Village (龙盘村)
- Nixilong Village (泥溪垅村)

== See also ==
- List of township-level divisions of Hunan
