= Nanyangqiao, Zhuzhou =

Township in Hunan, People's Republic of China

Coordinates: 27.6519°N 113.1603°E

Nanyangqiao Township (simplified Chinese: 南阳桥乡; traditional Chinese: 南陽橋鄉; pinyin: Nányángqiáo xiāng) is a rural township in Zhuzhou County, Zhuzhou City, Hunan Province, People's Republic of China.

== Villages ==
The township is divided into 17 villages, the following areas are: Zaohechong Village, Zhuyuanchong Village, Nanyanchong Village, Chengxialong Village, Zhoujiabu Village, Hengjiang Village, Tiexi Village, Nan'an Village, Zhuji Village, Chengtang Village, Sanwangchong Village, Dabaqiao Village, Majiawan Village, Jianzuowan Village, Tongshan Village, Nanyangqiao Village, and Yuanjiazhou Village.
