= Wanmin =

Wanmin 万民乡
- Township
- Location in Hunan
- Coordinates: 29°24′32″N 109°55′07″E
- Country: People's Republic of China
- Province: Hunan
- Autonomous prefecture: Xiangxi
- County: Yongshun
- Time zone: UTC+8 (China Standard)

Wanmin (万民乡) is a township in the northwest Hunan province of China.

== See also ==
- List of township-level divisions of Hunan
