= Lukou Town =

Town in Hunan, China

Coordinates: 27.7085°N 113.1372°E

Lukou Town (simplified Chinese: 渌口镇; traditional Chinese: 淥口鎮; pinyin: Lùkǒu Zhèn) is an urban town and the seat of Zhuzhou County in Hunan, China. As of the 2000 census it had a population of 78,000 and an area of 64.7 square kilometers.
