= Xinjian, Hunan =

Xinjian 新建镇
- Town
- Location in Hunan
- Coordinates: 27°31′20″N 110°10′55″E
- Country: People's Republic of China
- Province: Hunan
- Prefecture-level city: Huaihua
- County: Zhongfang County
- Time zone: UTC+8 (China Standard)

Xinjian (Chinese: 新建; pinyin: Xīnjiàn) is a town in Zhongfang County, Hunan province, China. As of 2018, it has one residential community and eight villages under its administration.

== See also ==
- List of township-level divisions of Hunan
