= Longchuan, Zhuzhou =

Town in Hunan, China

Longchuan (Chinese: 龙船镇; pinyin: Lóngchuán Zhèn) is a town of Zhuzhou County, Hunan, China. Amalgamating the former two townships of Wangshiwan and Tangshi, the town was established on November 26, 2015. It has an area of 160.85 km^{2} (62.10 sq mi). At the end of 2015, its population is 56,800. The town is divided into 25 villages and a community, and its administrative centre is Huashi Village (花石村).

== Subdivisions ==
Administrative Divisions of Longchuan Town (2016 - present)
| Current divisions | | Adjustment of administrative divisions in 2016 | |
| English names | Chinese names | English | Chinese |
| Wangshiwan Community | 王十万社区 | | |
| Bangtou Village | 榜头村 | | |
| Bantang Village | 板塘村 | merging the former Bantang and Dalong villages | 原板塘村支村和大垄村合并 |
| Changyuan Village | 长源村 | | |
| Chishi Village | 赤石村 | | |
| Fengxian Village | 枫仙村 | | |
| Hebao Village | 荷包村 | | |
| Huangzhu Village | 黄竹村 | | |
| Huashi Village | 花石村 | merging the former Huashi and Fujia villages | 原花石村和付家村合并 |
| Hutang Village | 湖塘村 | | |
| Jinhua Village | 金华村 | merging the former Jinhua and Midou villages | 原金华村和米斗村合并 |
| Lashu Village | 腊树村 | merging the former Lashu and Xiangxing villages | 原腊树村和向形村合并 |
| Longquan Village | 龙泉村 | merging the former Longquan and Jitou villages | 原龙泉村和矶头村合并 |
| Louxia Village | 楼厦村 | merging the former Louxia and Xinhu villages | 原楼下村和新湖村合并 |
| Meishan Village | 梅山村 | merging the former Meichong and Shantang villages | 原梅冲村和山塘村合并 |
| Miaoqian Village | 庙前村 | | |
| Shenshan Village | 神山村 | | |
| Shilong Village | 石龙村 | merging the former Shilong and Yinpai villages | 原建石龙村和银牌村合并 |
| Taishuitian Village | 太水田村 | | |
| Tangshi Village | 堂市村 | merging the former Wugong and Tangshi villages | 原蜈蚣村支村和堂市村合并 |
| Tucheng Village | 土城村 | merging the former Tucheng and Paitang villages | 原土城村和排塘村合并 |
| Wangshiwan Village | 王十万村 | merging the former Wangshiwan and Shihuichong villages | 原王十万村和石灰冲村合并 |
| Wanzhou Village | 挽洲村 | | |
| Xinhe Village | 新和村 | | |
| Yanjia Village | 颜家村 | | |
| Yingchun Village | 迎春村 | merging the former Yingchun and Chengbei villages | 原迎春村和城背村合并 |
