= Alaying =

Alaying Town
- Town

Chinese transcription(s)
  - Simplified: 阿拉营镇
  - Traditional: 阿拉營鎮
  - Pinyin: Ālāyíng Zhèn
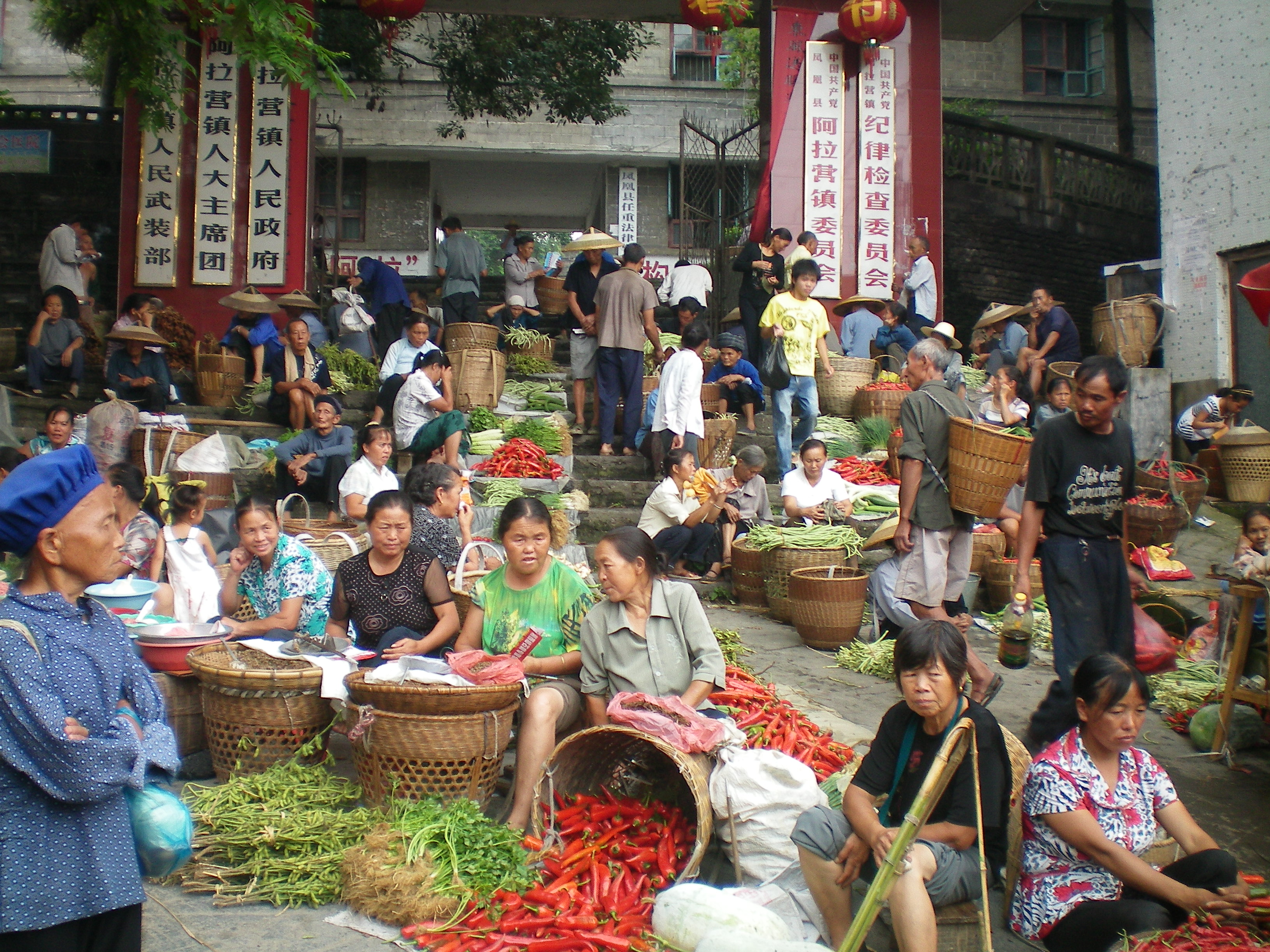

- Location in China
- Coordinates: 27°54′51″N 109°23′29″E
- Country: China
- Province: Hunan
- Prefecture: Xiangxi Tujia and Miao Autonomous Prefecture
- County: Fenghuang

Area
  - Total: 78 km^{2} (30 sq mi)
- Elevation: 1,010 m (3,310 ft)

Population
  - Total: 31,000
  - Density: 400/km^{2} (1,000/sq mi)
- Time zone: UTC+8 (China Standard)
- Postal code: 416202
- Area code: 0743

Alaying Town is a town of Fenghuang County in Hunan of South China. It is famous for its street market in Western Hunan.
