= Longtan, Zhuzhou =

Town in Zhuzhou, Hunan, China

Coordinates: 27.2948°N 113.1749°E

Longtan Township (simplified Chinese: 龙潭乡; traditional Chinese: 龍潭鄉; pinyin: Lóngtán Xiāng) is a rural township in Zhuzhou County, Zhuzhou City, Hunan Province, People's Republic of China.

== Cityscape ==
The township is divided into 11 villages, which include the following areas: Xinbaqiao Village, Shaohua Village, Xintian Village, Taishuichong Village, Leyun Village, Shuiyuan Village, Longtan Village, Xinyan Village, Ziyun Village, Tonggu Village, and Taihua Village.
