= Wentang, Xinhua =

Wentang Town 温塘镇
- Town
- Location in Hunan
- Coordinates: 27°52′22″N 111°30′44″E
- Country: People's Republic of China
- Province: Hunan
- Prefecture-level city: Loudi
- County: Xinhua

Area
  - Total: 168 km^{2} (65 sq mi)

Population
  - Total: 54,000
  - Density: 320/km^{2} (830/sq mi)
- Time zone: UTC+8 (China Standard)
- Postal code: 417622
- Area code: 0738

Wentang Town (simplified Chinese: 温塘镇; traditional Chinese: 溫塘鎮; pinyin: Wēntáng Zhèn) is an urban town in Xinhua County, Hunan Province, People's Republic of China.

== Administrative divisions ==
The town is divided into 50 villages and one community, which include the following areas: Ping'an Community, Xiangxing Village, Huanxin Village, Zhihua Village, Gongsheng Village, Lianhe Village, Xinghuo Village, Fanrong Village, Fuxing Village, Shijing Village, Wentang Village, Lihua Village, Qiaochong Village, Luoshuitang Village, Siwei Village, Shanyang Village, Pengshan Village, Xinxing Village, Shenxianling Village, Shanzhong Village, Huangfudian Village, Mijiayan Village, Zhoujia Village, Zhaolong Village, Wangjia Village, Chashan Village, Laowei Village, Chetianjiang Village, Yanhua Village, Gaolong Village, Dapingli Village, Niwan Village, Yantang Village, Daxing Village, Dishuidong Village, Yanjia Village, Citang Village, Nongke Village, Fengshu Village, Yanzhu Village, Baotang Village, Yijia Village, Xinglong'ao Village, Qiuzhu Village, Doutong Village, Meijia Village, Yonghong Village, Yongxi Village, Luojia Village, Yuanjiaxi Village, and Guojia Village (平安社区、祥星村、焕新村、支华村、共升村、联合村、星火村、繁荣村、富兴村、石井村、温塘村、利华村、桥冲村、落水塘村、四维村、山羊村、彭关村、新星村、神仙岭村、山中村、皇甫殿村、米家岩村、周家村、赵龙村、王家村、茶山村、劳卫村、车田江村、眼花村、高龙村、大坪里村、泥湾村、滟塘村、大兴村、滴水洞村、晏家村、祠堂村、农科村、枫树村、烟竹村、抱棠村、易家村、兴隆坳村、邱住村、徒桐村、梅家村、永红村、永溪村、罗家村、袁家溪村、郭家村).
