= Lingguandian =

Lingguandian 灵官殿镇
- Town
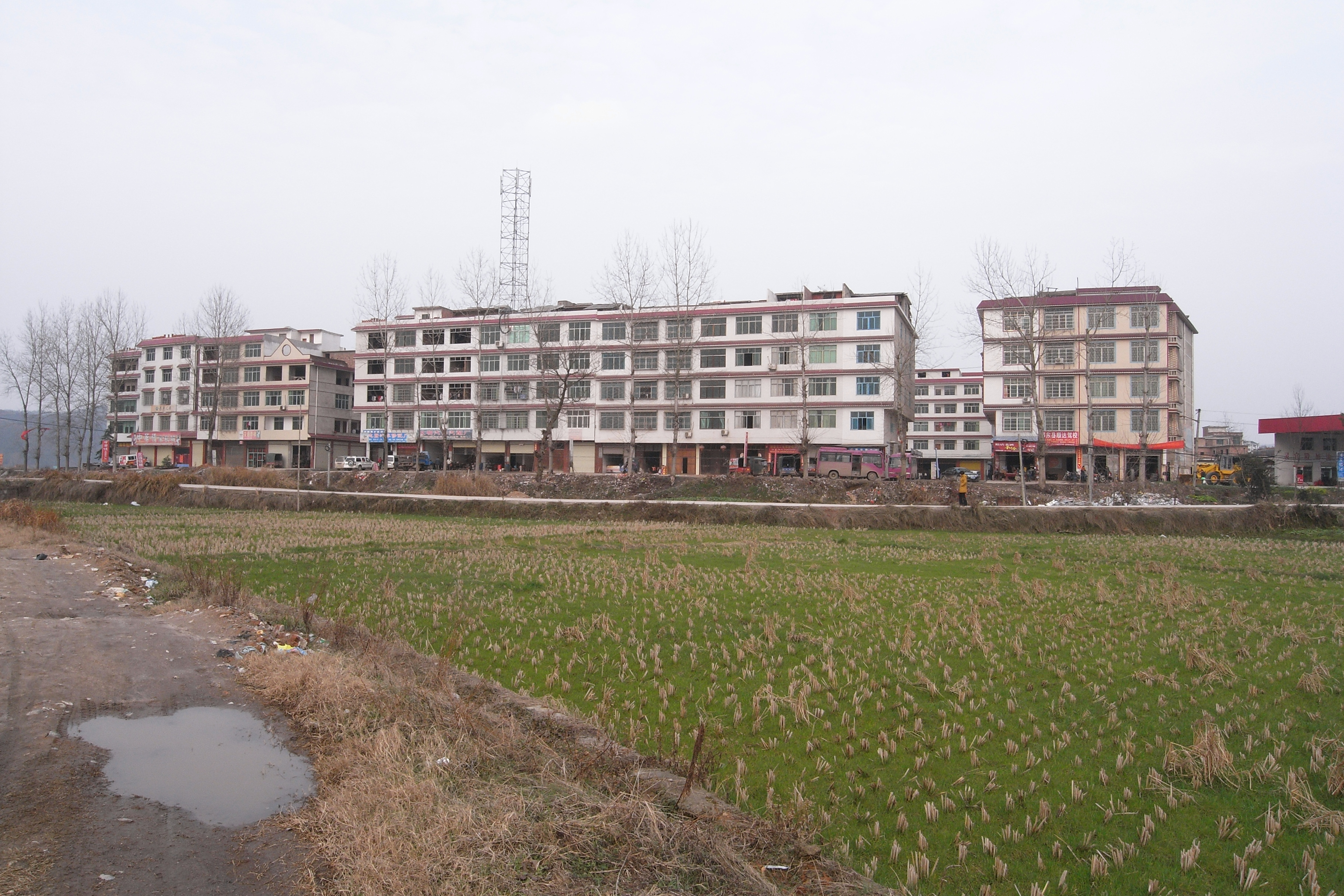
- Buildings in Lingguandian Town.

- Location in Hunan
- Coordinates: 27°01′54″N 111°56′34″E
- Country: People's Republic of China
- Province: Hunan
- Prefecture-level city: Shaoyang
- County-level city: Shaodong

Area
  - Total: 154.87 km^{2} (59.80 sq mi)

Population
  - Total: 96,400
  - Density: 622/km^{2} (1,610/sq mi)
- Time zone: UTC+08:00 (China Standard)
- Postal code: 422828
- Area code: 0739

Chinese name
- Traditional Chinese: 靈官殿鎮
- Simplified Chinese: 灵官殿镇
Transcriptions
Standard Mandarin
- Hanyu Pinyin: Língguāndiàn Zhèn

Lingguandian Town (Chinese: 灵官殿镇) is a town located in the southern part of the Shaodong County, Hunan Province. Its name in Chinese means Temple of Spiritual Officer in Daoism. It is 42 kilometres (26 mi) away from the county seat, with an area of 154.87-square-kilometre (59.80 sq mi) and a total population of 94,600. It is located in a hilly area surrounded by mountains, with a flat middle and shaped like a basin. Lingguandian Town governs 41 villages and one neighborhood committee. The town has complete infrastructure, rich tourism resources and special resources, and Lingguan Temple has unique fish farming resources. The economy is developing well.

== History ==
In 1950, it was the tenth district of Shaoyang County. In 1961, Maohedian Township was established. In 1995, it was renamed Linguandian Township. In 1996, it was built. On December 31, 2015, the original Shizhuqiao Township and the original Lingguandian Town merged into a new Lingguandian Town.

== Location ==
Lingguandian Town is situated at the junction of Xiangyang, Shaoyang and Hengyang "Sanyang", which is a strategically importantant location. It borders Shetian Bridge in the east, Jidong and Xiangyang in the west, and faces the Fort Front in the south. It is the only entrance from Hunan to Guangxi. Shao Gui Highway crosses the territory. Jurisdiction over 41 villages and one neighborhood committee.

== Natural resources ==
Lingguandian Town is rich in products. The lead-zinc deposits and fluorite deposits in the Dayunshan Gold Mine, Ma'anshan and Xiaotoutou are not only rich in reserves, but also have high mining rates. The Mine 717 at the foot of Dayun Mountain was once a key enterprise in the central and provincial provinces. The agriculture of Lingguandian Town is mainly planted with double-season rice. In recent years, the cultivation of oil tea, grapes and medicinal materials has flourished. Among them, the output of grapes is the largest, and the variety is high and the quality is excellent. Famous for its products, the products are sold both inside and outside the province. Tea oil is another special product of Lingguan Temple. More than 20 villages such as Shengwang and Qiaozhuangchong are rich in tea fruit, processed tea oil, no oil residue, clear and pure, and it is a true pure natural vegetable oil.

== Infrastructure ==
In 2014, with the support of the county party committee and county government, the county's only central enterprise, Zhongxiang Wind Power, was introduced. In 2015, it was connected to the grid for power generation with a total investment of 450 million yuan and an annual power generation capacity of 100 million kWh.
