= Gantian, Zhuzhou =

Town in Zhuzhou, Hunan, China

Coordinates: 27.4867°N 113.1441°E

Gantian Town (simplified Chinese: 淦田镇; traditional Chinese: 淦田鎮; pinyin: Gàntián Zhèn) is an urban town in Zhuzhou County, Zhuzhou City, Hunan Province, People's Republic of China.

== Cityscape ==
The town is divided into 25 villages and two communities, which include the following areas: Chezhan Community, Xinjie Community, Changya Village, Rangshui Village, Nianyushan Village, Hongtu Village, Hengling Village, Panlong Village, Tongluo Village, Sanxia Village, Sutang Village, Hujian Village, Jianning Village, Xinma Village, Gantian Village, Zaihu Village, Qipan Village, Qingnan Village, Qingshan Village, Nangang Village, Xian'e Village, Yaoquan Village, Badou Village, Dongchong Village, Nantang Village, Maoping Village, and Zaimu Village.
