= Longmen, Zhuzhou =

Rural township in Zhuzhou, Hunan, China

Coordinates: 27°26′17″N 113°09′41″E

Longmen (Chinese: 龙门镇; pinyin: Lóngmén Zhèn) is a town of Zhuzhou County, Hunan, China. It was reorganized to establish by Taihu Township to a town on November 26, 2015. It has an area of 126.36 km^{2} (48.79 sq mi). As of the end of 2015, its population is 22,000. The town is divided into 12 villages, and its administrative centre is Tongzipo (桐子坡).

== Cityscape ==
The township is divided into 22 villages, which include the following areas: Jiushi Village, Tongzi Village, Huanghua Village, Changxing Village, Guotian Village, Yongfeng Village, Yongfu Village, Shuiku Village, Taihu Village, Fengxing Village, Longmen Village, Hongtang Village, Qingtang Village, Mantang Village, Dengjia Village, Lijia Village, Citang Village, Quanlong Village, Zhoujia Village, Tai'an Village, Huangni Village, and Huachong Village (九狮村、桐梓村、黄花村、长形村、果田村、永丰村、永福村、水库村、太湖村、凤形村、龙门村、洪塘村、清塘村、满塘村、邓家村、李家村、茨塘村、泉龙村、周家村、太安村、黄泥村、花冲村).
