= Zhuting, Zhuzhou =

Zhuting Town 朱亭镇
- Town
- Location in Hunan
- Coordinates: 27°24′10″N 113°03′41″E
- Country: People's Republic of China
- Province: Hunan
- Prefecture-level city: Zhuzhou
- County: Zhuzhou

Area
  - Total: 88 km^{2} (34 sq mi)

Population
  - Total: 25,700
  - Density: 290/km^{2} (760/sq mi)
- Time zone: UTC+8 (China Standard)
- Postal code: 邮编
- Area code: 0731

Zhuting Town (simplified Chinese: 朱亭镇; traditional Chinese: 朱亭鎮; pinyin: Zhūtíng zhèn) is an urban town in Zhuzhou County, Hunan Province, People's Republic of China.

== Cityscape ==
The town is divided into 22 villages and three communities, which include the following areas: Gangjie Community, Xinjie Community, Chezhan Community, Xiaohua Village, Zhenghua Village, Fenghuang Village, Tanggai Village, Huanglong Village, Longxing Village, Gaofu Village, Huangzhou Village, Tianchangping Village, Shanqiao Village, Shixun Village, Tangyuan Village, Shuangjiang Village, Zhujialong Village, Maqiao Village, Xinglong Village, Hongqi Village, Jiuqiu'ao Village, Chunshi Village, Gaosheng Village, Shuikou Village, and Pailou Village (港街社区、新街社区、车站社区、小花村、政花村、凤凰村、塘改村、黄龙村、龙形村、高伏村、黄洲村、天长坪村、杉桥村、石圳村、塘源村、双江村、朱家垅村、马桥村、兴隆村、红旗村、九丘坳村、春石村、高升村、水口村、排楼村).
