= Tianmen Township, Hunan =

Tianmen Township 天门乡
- Township
- Location in Hunan
- Coordinates: 27°51′50″N 111°00′47″E
- Country: People's Republic of China
- Province: Hunan
- Prefecture-level city: Loudi
- County: Xinhua

Area
  - Total: 150 km^{2} (58 sq mi)

Population
  - Total: 12,000
  - Density: 80/km^{2} (210/sq mi)
- Time zone: UTC+8 (China Standard)
- Postal code: 417632
- Area code: 0738

Tianmen Township (simplified Chinese: 天门乡; traditional Chinese: 天門鄉; pinyin: Tiānmén Xiāng) is a rural township in Xinhua County, Hunan Province, People's Republic of China.

== Administrative divisions ==
The township is divided into 16 villages, which include the following areas: Nanmen Village, Tianmen Village, Eping Village, Maiping Village, Sheping Village, Liuxin Village, Qingwei Village, Tuping Village, Liangfeng Village, Jianshi Village, Jinma Village, Shuxi Village, Gaotian Village, Dashan Village, Linchang Village, and Changfeng Village (南门村、天门村、鹅坪村、麦坳村、蛇坪村、留心村、青围村、土坪村、凉风村、尖石村、金马村、树溪村、高田村、大山村、林场村、长峰村).
