= Qianshanhong =

Qianshanhong Town 千山红镇
- Town
- Location in Hunan
- Coordinates: 29°08′39″N 112°26′05″E
- Country: People's Republic of China
- Province: Hunan
- Prefecture-level city: Yiyang
- County: Nan

Area
  - Total: 74.9 km^{2} (28.9 sq mi)

Population
  - Total: 28,000
  - Density: 370/km^{2} (970/sq mi)
- Time zone: UTC+8 (China Standard)
- Area code: 0737

Qianshanhong Town (simplified Chinese: 千山红镇; traditional Chinese: 千山紅鎮; pinyin: Qiānshānhóng Zhèn) is an urban town in Nan County, Hunan Province, People's Republic of China.

== Administrative divisions ==
The town is divided into 22 villages and 3 communities, which include the following areas: Hounan Community, Beiting Community, Qiaobei Community, Lizhen Village, Zhongzhou Village, Lihou Village, Bailong Village, Daxigang Village, Xiaoxigang Village, Nanhe Village, Lannihu Village, Xiangnan Village, Zhongfu Village, Shengli Village, Xiaolianhu Village, Wujiayuan Village, Minhe Village, Shizigang Village, Xinyu Village, Xizhou Village, Wuqi Village, Daxihu Village, Jinsha Village, Dongnanhu Village, Dalianhuyuchang Village (厚南社区、北汀社区、桥北社区、利贞村、中洲村、利厚村、白龙村、大西港村、小西港村、南河村、烂泥湖村、向南村、种福村、胜利村、小莲湖村、伍家圆村、民和村、十字港村、新裕村、西洲村、五七村、大西湖村、金沙村、东南湖村、大莲湖渔场村).
