= Ronghua =

Ronghua Township 荣华乡
- Township
- Location in Hunan
- Coordinates: 28°03′24″N 111°10′42″E
- Country: People's Republic of China
- Province: Hunan
- Prefecture-level city: Loudi
- County: Xinhua

Area
  - Total: 125 km^{2} (48 sq mi)

Population
  - Total: 26,000
  - Density: 210/km^{2} (540/sq mi)
- Time zone: UTC+8 (China Standard)
- Postal code: 417615
- Area code: 0738

Ronghua Township (simplified Chinese: 荣华乡; traditional Chinese: 榮華鄉; pinyin: Rónghuá Xiāng) is a rural township in Xinhua County, Hunan Province, People's Republic of China.

== Administrative divisions ==
The township is divided into 30 villages, which include the following areas: Huangjiatai Village, Hengxi Village, Liushu Village, Zhangjiawan Village, Liujia Village, Dale Village, Gongtian Village, Bailong Village, Xin'an Village, Guojie Village, Tanjia Village, Letuan Village, Lehua Village, Lejia Village, Hengcha Village, Changling Village, Zhaimen Village, Lishu Village, Fangxi Village, Caojia Village, Tianguo Village, Xintianchong Village, Queqiao Village, Yilong Village, Baida Village, Hehua Village, Ronghua Village, Yangjia Village, Xiaolu Village, and Hengyan Village (黄家台村、横溪村、柳树村、张家湾村、刘家村、大乐村、共田村、白龙村、新安村、过街村、谭家村、乐团村、乐华村、乐家村、横茶村、长岭村、寨门村、栗树村、芳溪村、曹家村、田果村、新田冲村、鹊桥村、易龙村、白大村、荷华村、荣华村、杨家村、小鹿村、横岩村).
