= Guyuefeng, Zhuzhou =

Town in China

Coordinates: 27.5365°N 112.9992°E

Guyuefeng Town (simplified Chinese: 古岳峰镇; traditional Chinese: 古嶽峰鎮; pinyin: Gǔyuèfēng Zhèn) is an urban town in Zhuzhou County, Zhuzhou City, Hunan Province, People's Republic of China.

== Cityscape ==
The town is divided into 19 villages and one community, which include the following areas: Tangyuan'ao Community, Xiangyang Village, Sanwang Village, Hongyi Village, Hengtang Village, Shitang Village, Dijia Village, Jintai Village, Youyi Village, Liaojia Village, Hetai Village, Zhaoshan Village, Jinpan Village, Baibi Village, Changshan Village, Rougongci Village, Yuefeng Village, Batang Village, Lishuping Village, and Yaotang Village.
