= Chaxi =

Chaxi 槎溪镇
- Town
- Location in Hunan
- Coordinates: 27°38′53″N 111°08′45″E
- Country: People's Republic of China
- Province: Hunan
- Prefecture-level city: Loudi
- County: Xinhua County

Area
  - Total: 107 km^{2} (41 sq mi)

Population
  - Total: 35,000
  - Density: 330/km^{2} (850/sq mi)
- Time zone: UTC+8 (China Standard)
- Postal code: 417628
- Area code: 0738

Chaxi Town (simplified Chinese: 槎溪镇; traditional Chinese: 槎溪鎮; pinyin: Cháxī Zhèn) is an urban town in and subdivision of Xinhua County, Hunan Province, People's Republic of China.

== Administrative divisions ==
The town is divided into 28 villages and one community, which include the following areas: Zhaohui Community, Chaoyang Village, Lebai Village, Zhenghui Village, Menggongling Village, Shimenkou Village, Tiandangyuan Village, Yangjiabian Village, Xinqun Village, Shizhapai Village, Fengyang Village, Shihetang Village, Niao'ao Village, Fumin Village, Hengjiang Village, Banshanjie Village, Shuangshu Village, Hongyanqiao Village, Rixing Village, Mugua Village, Bixi Village, Houxi Village, Shengnong Village, Jinxi Village, Yuanzhu Village, Benteng Village, Youping Village, Shuangxi Village, and Zhushanwan Village.
