= Zhouping, Zhuzhou =

Zhouping Township
- Township

Chinese transcription(s)
  - Simplified: 洲坪乡
  - Traditional: 洲坪鄉
  - Pinyin: Zhouping Xiang
- Location in China
- Coordinates: 27°35′51″N 113°06′56″E
- Country: People's Republic of China
- Province: Hunan
- City: Zhuzhou
- County: Zhuzhou County

Area
  - Total: 80.3 km^{2} (31.0 sq mi)

Population
  - Total: 23,000
  - Density: 290/km^{2} (740/sq mi)
- Time zone: UTC+8 (China Standard)
- Area code: 0733

Zhouping Township (simplified Chinese: 洲坪乡; traditional Chinese: 洲坪鄉; pinyin: zhōupíng xiāng), is a rural township in Zhuzhou County, Zhuzhou City, Hunan Province, People's Republic of China.

== Cityscape ==
The township is divided into 20 villages and 1 community, the following areas: Zhaoling Community, Qingshuitang Village, Sizhouzhan Village, Mazhou Village, Honglong Village, Wujiaqiao Village, Shibanqiao Village, Xiqueqiao Village, Zhaoling Village, Xiashi Village, Daguan Village, Tianjiachong Village, Wuyashan Village, Xujiawan Village, Jiangjun Village, Wushilong Village, Beiping Village, Nongkezhan Village, Hetang Village, Jiangbian Village, and Caihuaqiao Village (昭陵社区、清水塘村、泗洲站村、马洲村、洪垅村、五架桥村、石板桥村、喜鹊桥村、昭陵村、霞石村、大观村、田家冲村、乌鸦山村、许家湾村、将军村、乌石垅村、北坪村、农科站村、荷塘村、江边村、菜花桥村).
