= Pingtan Township =

Pingtan Township 坪坦乡
- Township
- Location in Hunan
- Coordinates: 26°2′18″N 109°42′41″E
- Country: People's Republic of China
- Province: Hunan
- Prefecture-level city: Huaihua
- Autonomous county: Tongdao Dong Autonomous County
- Time zone: UTC+8 (China Standard)

Pingtan Township (simplified Chinese: 坪坦乡; traditional Chinese: 坪坦鄉; pinyin: Píngtǎn Xiāng) is a township under the administration of Tongdao Dong Autonomous County, Hunan, China. As of 2020, it administers the following 16 villages:

- Pingtan Village
- Hengling Village (横岭村)
- Pingri Village (平日村)
- Gaoben Village (高本村)
- Shuangceng Village (双层村)
- Xiapan Village (下盘村)
- Banpo Village (半坡村)
- Huangdu Village (皇都村)
- Dutian Village (都天村)
- Zhongbu Village (中步村)
- Pingzhai Village (坪寨村)
- Daping Village (大坪村)
- Shuangji Village (双吉村)
- Lingnan Village (岭南村)
- Gaobu Village (高步村)
- Lianping Village (联坪村)
