= Lianqiao Town =

Administrative unit in Shaoyang City, China

Coordinates: 27°19′33″N 111°50′38″E

Lianqiao Town (simplified Chinese: 廉桥镇; traditional Chinese: 廉橋鎮; pinyin: Liánqiáo Zhèn) is a township-level administrative unit under the jurisdiction of Shaodong, Shaoyang City, Hunan Province, the People's Republic of China. The town covers an area of 98 square kilometers and has a permanent population of 82,000. It is an economically strong town in Shaodong City.

== Administrative divisions ==
Lianqiao Town has jurisdiction over 35 villages and 2 neighborhood committees, including:

Lianqiao Community, Lianqiao Village, Danquan Village, Shentang Village, Liandong Village, Youai Village, Taiyang Village, Xinglong Ao Village, Aofeng Village, Xinmin Village, Jiji Village, Lilong Village, Chutang Village, An'an Village, Maoping Chen Village, Xinlian Village, Nanxing Village, Tianping Village, Shuangyi Village, Yongyue Village, Zhujiachong Village, Changlong Village, Huating Village, Zhukui Village, Baimapu Village, Xinjian Village, Rabbitping Village, Xujiapu Village, Zhongfu Village, Fengzu Village, Tiantai Village, Lianfeng Village, Huangni Chongcun, Yongan Village, Changan Village, Moshi Village, Congguang Village, Guangpi Village, Guangji Village, Jinpen Village, Jietian Village, Xinping Village, Qingtan Village, Qingjian Village, Waziping Village, Gaogao Village, Hehe Village, Dantang Village, Liujing Village, Luqian Village, Qianjin Village, Liaoni Village, Huangnitang Village, Dongtang Village, Luojia Village and Shishan Village.

== Medicinal materials industry ==
The town has the fourth-largest professional medicinal materials market in China, selling more than 2,000 types of Chinese medicinal materials, with 11,000 employees and an annual transaction total of more than 8.2 billion yuan. It is one of the first batch of characteristic towns in China and one of the top ten agricultural characteristic towns in Hunan Province.

== Education ==
At the end of 2011, Lianqiao Town had a total of 6 kindergartens, 7 primary schools and 3 junior high schools. The nine-year compulsory education coverage rate was 100%.

The Shaodong No. 2 Middle School (邵东二中), formerly Nanjing Sanmin Middle School (南京三民中学) founded in 1929, was located near Taiyang Village since its move from Nanjing to Lianqiao. In 2003, it was rated a model senior high school in Shaoyang City. The school was closed in 2015.

== Transportation ==
National Highway 320, Tan-Shao Expressway and Luo-Zhan Railway pass through the town.

== See also ==
- Shaodong
- Shaoyang
- Niumasi Town
- List of township-level divisions of Hunan
