= Ping Zhou (researcher) =

American electrical engineer

Ping Zhou is an electrical engineer at ANSYS Incorporated in Canonsburg, Pennsylvania. He was named a Fellow of the Institute of Electrical and Electronics Engineers (IEEE) in 2016 for his contributions to finite element methods applied to electromagnetic devices and electrical machines.
