= Liangshi =

Liangshi is a toneless pinyin transliteration of multiple Chinese-language given names. Notable people with such a name include:

- Liangshi (Chinese: 良士), courtesy name of Han Xiu, Tang dynasty politician
- Lin Liangshi (Chinese: 林良实; 1943–2026), Malaysian politician
- Pan Liangshi (Chinese: 潘良时), Chinese lieutenant general
