= Heitianpu =

Heitianpu 黑田铺镇
- Town
- Location in Hunan
- Coordinates: 27°19′42″N 111°45′53″E
- Country: China
- Province: Hunan
- Prefecture-level city: Shaoyang
- County-level city: Shaodong

Area
  - Total: 100.89 km^{2} (38.95 sq mi)

Population (2017)
  - Total: 45,852
  - Density: 454.48/km^{2} (1,177.1/sq mi)
- Time zone: UTC+08:00 (China Standard)
- Postal code: 422815
- Area code: 0739

Chinese name
- Traditional Chinese: 黑田鋪鎮
- Simplified Chinese: 黑田铺镇
Transcriptions
Standard Mandarin
- Hanyu Pinyin: Hēitiánpù Zhèn

Heitianpu (Chinese: 黑田铺镇) is a town in Shaodong, Hunan, China. As of the 2017 census it had a population of 45,852 and an area of 100.89 square kilometres (38.95 sq mi). It borders Chenjiafang Town and Taizhimiao Township of Xinshao County in the north, Lianqiao Town in the east, Huangpiqiao Township, Dahetang Subdistrict and Songjiatang Subdistrict in south, and Niumasi Town in the west.

== History ==
In 1950 it was known as "Baoshan Township" (宝善乡). In 1958 its name was changed to "Heitianpu People's Commune". It was restored as a township in 1984.

== Administrative divisions ==
As of 2017, the town is divided into 50 villages.

== Economy ==
The main industries in and around the town is wood processing. Pig production is an important source of meat for rural communities and of income. Other sources of income include Chinese herbal medicine.

== Tourism ==
Zidong Academy (资东书院) was built in 1827 by Shen Dengwu (沈登伍), it was burned by the Japanese army in the Second Sino-Japanese War.

Kangfu Pavilion (康阜亭) was built in 1786 during the reign of Qianlong Emperor of the Qing dynasty (1644–1911) and has been designated as municipal cultural relic preservation organ by the Government of Shaoyang in 2011.

== Notable people ==
- Xie Boyu, revolutionist.
- Zhang Guochu, lieutenant general of the People's Liberation Army.
- Chen Guangzhong, lieutenant general of the National Revolutionary Army.
