= Sanjiang, Xupu County =

Town in Hunan, China

Sanjiang (三江) is a town in Xupu County, Hunan, China. As of 2017, it had 23 villages under its administration.

It was formed in 2015 by combining the administrative areas of Gangdong Township (岗东乡), Liangjiang Township (两江乡), and Shanxi Township (善溪乡).
