= Shamuqiao =

Shanmuqiao Town 杉木桥镇
- Town
- Location in Hunan
- Coordinates: 29°32′29″N 110°56′09″E
- Country: People's Republic of China
- Province: Hunan
- Prefecture-level city: Zhangjiajie
- County: Cili

Area
  - Total: 91 km^{2} (35 sq mi)

Population
  - Total: 28,300
  - Density: 310/km^{2} (810/sq mi)
- Time zone: UTC+8 (China Standard)
- Postal code: 427219
- Area code: 0744

Shamuqiao Town (simplified Chinese: 杉木桥镇; traditional Chinese: 杉木橋鎮; pinyin: Shānmùqiáo Zhèn) is an urban town in Cili County, Hunan Province, People's Republic of China.

== Administrative divisions ==
The town is divided into 27 villages and 2 communities, which include the following areas: Xijie Community, Dongjie Community, Huta Village, Fengya Village, Longguanping Village, Xiaoling Village, Fengling Village, Baozi Village, Sishui Village, Zhongrong Village, Qiling Village, Longtan Village, Yueliang Village, Qingshui Village, Yuanyu Village, Yangjiata Village, Dashi Village, Guanping Village, Yuanping Village, Zhaojiapu Village, Damen Village, Huqiu Village, Lishan Village, Shizi Village, Jianjiao Village, Mata Village, Yanghua Village, Sandou Village, and Zhanma Village (西街社区、东街社区、湖塔村、枫垭村、龙关坪村、小岭村、风岭村、豹子村、泗水村、中溶村、七岭村、龙潭村、月亮村、清水村、沅峪村、杨家塔村、大市村、关坪村、沅坪村、赵家铺村、大门村、湖丘村、栗山村、狮子村、尖角村、马塔村、杨华村、三斗村、战马村).
