= Wentian, Xinhua =

Wentian Town 文田镇
- Town
- Location in Hunan
- Coordinates: 27°43′34″N 111°01′18″E
- Country: People's Republic of China
- Province: Hunan
- Prefecture-level city: Loudi
- County: Xinhua

Area
  - Total: 94.3 km^{2} (36.4 sq mi)

Population
  - Total: 20,000
  - Density: 210/km^{2} (550/sq mi)
- Time zone: UTC+8 (China Standard)
- Postal code: 417630
- Area code: 0738

Wentian Town (simplified Chinese: 文田镇; traditional Chinese: 文田鎮; pinyin: Wéntián Zhèn) is an urban town in Xinhua County, Hunan Province, People's Republic of China.

== Administrative divisions ==
The town is divided into 19 villages and one community, which include the following areas: Huanglong Community, Wentian Village, Maotian Village, Xinwuchang Village, Fangzhu Village, Pingshu Village, Xinxin Village, Qiaoping Village, Xianhui Village, Langshan Village, Shiyan Village, Qingjing Village, Datian Village, Longxi Village, Shiyang Village, Xiaochang Village, Zhuji Village, Bajiaoshan Village, Fugong'ao Village, Shanghengxi Village (黄龙社区、文田村、茅田村、新屋场村、方竹村、坪树村、欣欣村、桥坪村、先辉村、浪山村、石燕村、青京村、大田村、龙溪村、石羊村、小长村、竹鸡村、芭蕉山村、富公坳村、上横溪村).
