= Aoshang (Chenzhou) =

Aoshang Town
- Town

Chinese transcription(s)
  - Simplified: 坳上镇
  - Traditional: 坳上鎮
  - Pinyin: Àoshàng Zhèn
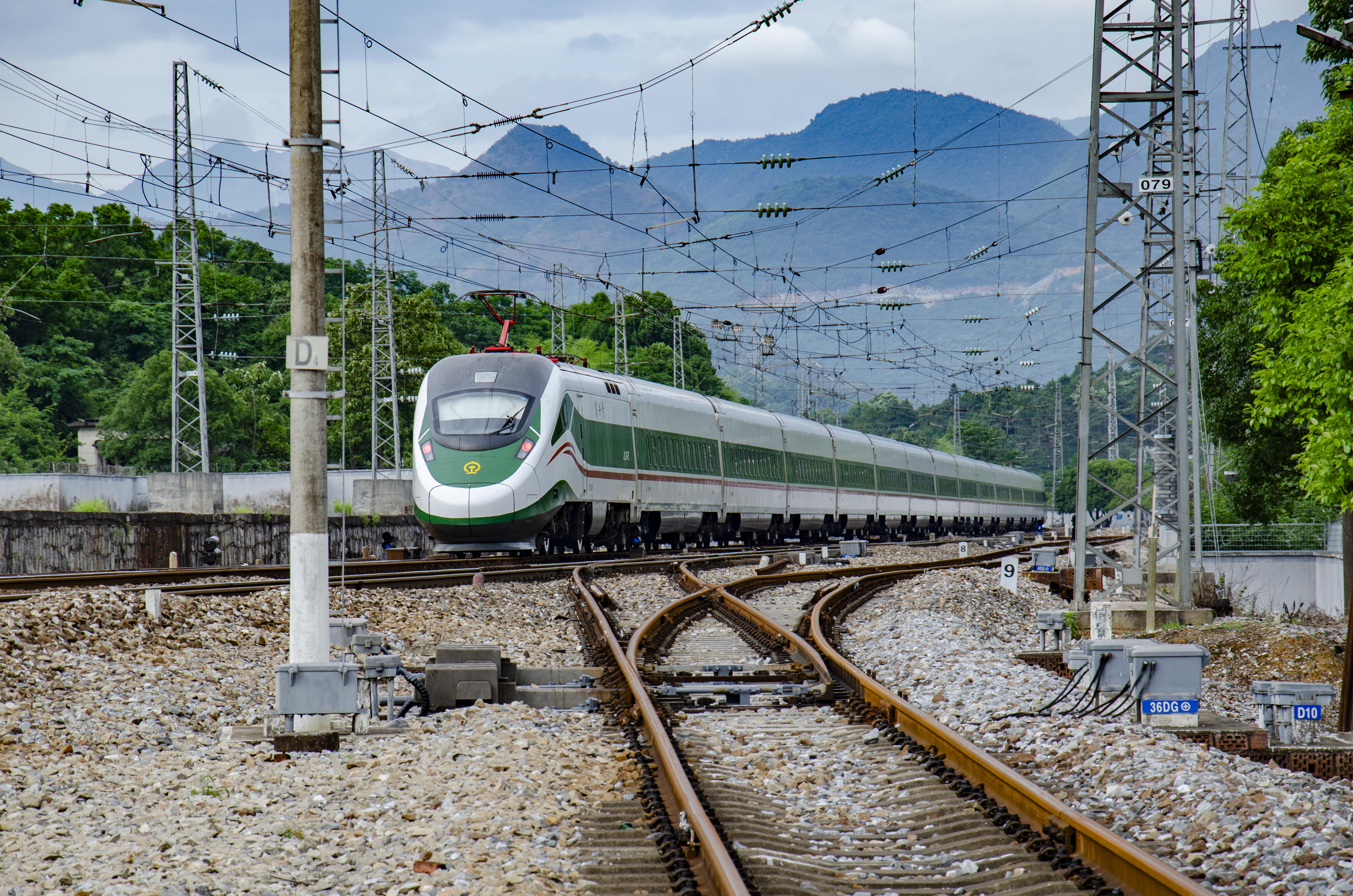
- Passenger train D90 passes through Aoshang Station

- Location in Hunan
- Coordinates: 25.684161°N 113.032165°E
- Country: China
- Province: Hunan
- Prefecture: Chenzhou
- District: Suxian District

Area
  - Total: 103.8 km^{2} (40.1 sq mi)

Population (2017)
  - Total: 22,000
  - Density: 210/km^{2} (550/sq mi)
- Time zone: UTC+8 (China Standard)
- Postal code: 423026
- Area code: 0735

Aoshang (Chinese: 坳上镇) is an urban town in Suxian District of Chenzhou, Hunan, China. As of the 2017 census it had a population of 22,000 and an area of 103.8 square kilometres (40.1 sq mi). It is surrounded by Chenjiang Subdistrict on the north, Zengfu Subdistrict on the west, Wugaishan Town and Bailutang Town on the east, and Liangtian Town on the south.

== Administrative divisions ==
As of 2017, the town is divided into 10 villages and 2 communities.

== Transportation ==
The town is connected to two highways: G4 Beijing–Hong Kong and Macau Expressway and G76 Xiamen–Chengdu Expressway.

The Beijing–Guangzhou railway serves the town.

The South Chenjiang Road (Chinese: 郴江南路) passes across the town.

== Attractions ==
The main attractions are the Hunan-Guangzhou Ancient Road and the Ancient Residential Groups of Aoshang Village.
