= Taochuan, Hunan =

Taochuan 桃川镇
- Town
- Location within China
- Coordinates: 25°06′44″N 111°06′07″E
- Country: China
- Province: Hunan
- Prefecture: Yongzhou
- County: Jiangyong County

Area
  - Total: 217 km^{2} (84 sq mi)
- Time zone: UTC+8 (China Standard)

Taochuan (Chinese: 桃川镇) is a town located in the Jiangyong County of Yongzhou, Hunan, China.
