= Lukou, Zhuzhou =

Lukou 渌口区
- District
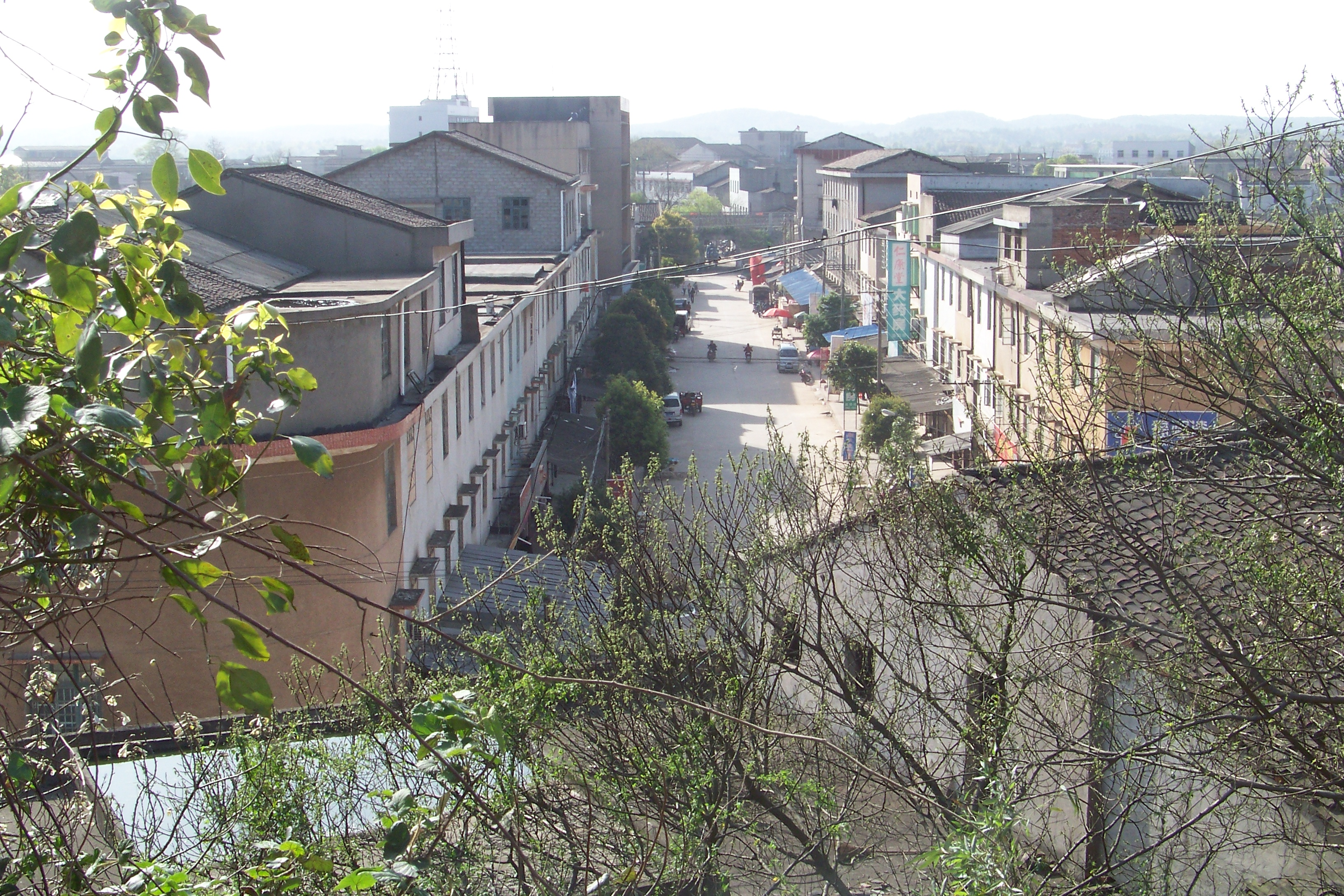

- Location in Hunan
- Coordinates: 27°41′57″N 113°08′39″E
- Country: People's Republic of China
- Province: Hunan
- Prefecture-level city: Zhuzhou
- Time zone: UTC+8 (China Standard)

Lukou District is a district of the city of Zhuzhou, Hunan Province, China. Located on the south central Hunan along the Xiang River, the district is bordered to the north by Liuyang City, Lusong and Tianyuan Districts, to the west by Xiangtan County, to the southwest by Hengdong County, to the southeast by You County, and to the east by Liling City. Lukou covers an area of 1,053.62 km^{2} (406.80 sq mi), and as of 2015, it had a registered population of 348,800 and a resident population of 292,400. The district has 8 towns under its jurisdiction; the seat is at Lukou Town (渌口镇). The district was formerly known as Zhuzhou County (Chinese: 株洲县; pinyin: Zhūzhōu Xiàn).

== Administrative divisions ==
At present, Lukou District has 8 towns.

- Gantian (淦田镇)
- Guyuefeng (古岳峰镇)
- Longchuan (龙船镇)
- Longmen (龙门镇)
- Longtan (龙潭镇)
- Lukou (渌口镇)
- Nanzhou (南洲镇)
- Zhuting (朱亭镇)
