= Yuhuangdong Grottoes =

Taoist stone sculptures on Makong Mountain, Hunan Province, China

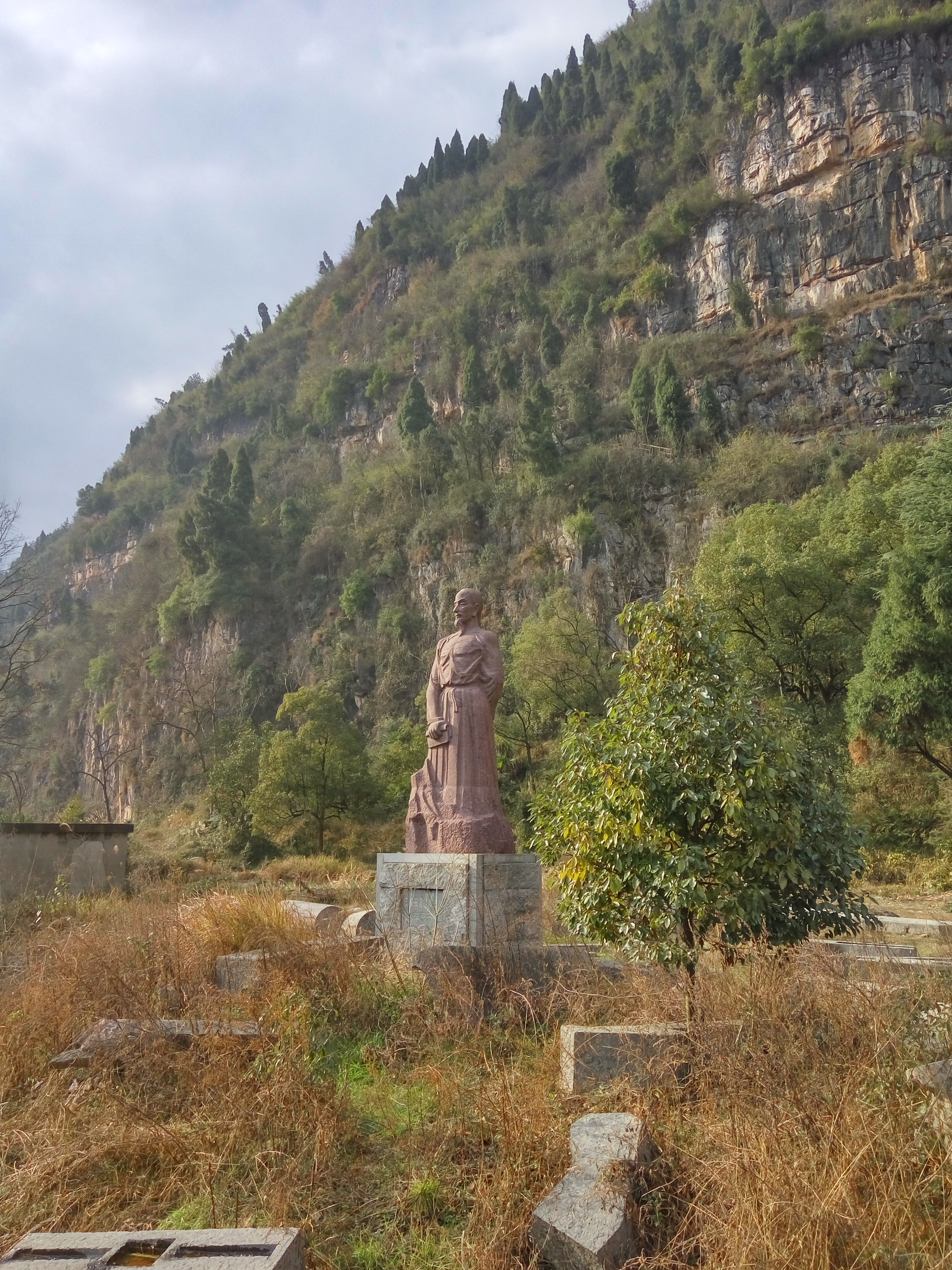
- Cultures: Taoism
- Location: Zhangjiajie, China

History
- Built: 1807
- Built by: Li Jingkai

Yuhuangdong Grottoes (Chinese: 玉皇洞石窟), or Yuhuang Grottoes, named after the statue of the Jade Emperor carved inside the cave, are Chinese Taoist stone sculptures, located on a cliff at the southern foot of Makong Mountain (麻空山), Fengxianggang Township (枫香岗乡), Yongding District, Zhangjiajie City, Hunan Province.

== Distribution ==
Yuhuangdong Grottoes, 10 kilometers away from the urban area, are distributed on a section of precipice about 300 meters long from east to west and more than 130 meters high.

== History ==
Yuhuangdong Grottoes were excavated by Li Jingkai (李京开), a Qing Dynasty Yongding country gentry (乡绅), and In 1799, these grottoes began to be constructed in 1799 and it took eight years to complete in 1807.
