= Mahekou =

Mahekou Township
- township

Chinese transcription(s)
  - Simplified: 马合口白族乡
  - Traditional: 馬合口白族鄉
  - Pinyin: Mahekou Xiang
- Location in China
- Coordinates: 29°32′39″N 110°21′36″E
- Country: China
- Province: Hunan
- Prefecture-level city: Zhangjiajie
- County: Sangzhi County

Area
  - Total: 126.6 km^{2} (48.9 sq mi)

Population
  - Total: 10,000
  - Density: 79/km^{2} (200/sq mi)
- Time zone: UTC+8 (China Standard)
- Postal code: 427103
- Area code: 0744

Mahekou Township (simplified Chinese: 马合口白族乡; traditional Chinese: 馬合口白族鄉; pinyin: Mahekou Xiang) is a rural township in Sangzhi County, Zhangjiajie, Hunan Province, China.

== Administrative divisions ==
The township is divided into 16 villages, which include the following areas: Mahekou Village, Zhongzhuangping Village, Cangjiatai Village, Suoziqiu Village, Wanzhongluo Village, Gongjiajie Village, Zishengqiao Village, Wangjiatian Village, Jiamuyu Village, Wazhuangping Village, Zhangmaping Village, Liujiasi Village, Muxia Village, Shuanggang Village, Yinzigang Village, and Chachang Village (马合口村、中庄坪村、苍家台村、梭子丘村、万中洛村、龚家界村、自生桥村、王家田村、佳木峪村、瓦庄坪村、长马坪村、刘家寺村、木峡村、双岗村、银子岗村、茶场村).
