= Lifuta =

Lifuta Town
- Town

Chinese transcription(s)
  - Simplified: 利福塔镇
  - Traditional: 利福塔鎮
  - Pinyin: Lìfútǎ Zhèn
- Location in China
- Coordinates: 29°20′40″N 110°04′50″E
- Country: China
- Province: Hunan
- city: Zhangjiajie
- County: Sangzhi County

Area
  - Total: 84 km^{2} (32 sq mi)

Population
  - Total: 18,000
  - Density: 210/km^{2} (550/sq mi)
- Time zone: UTC+8 (China Standard)
- Postal code: 427112
- Area code: 0744

Lifuta Town (simplified Chinese: 利福塔镇; traditional Chinese: 利福塔鎮; pinyin: Lìfútǎ Zhèn) is an urban town in Sangzhi County, Zhangjiajie, Hunan Province, China. Jiutian Cave, the largest cave found in China, is located there.

== Administrative divisions ==
The town is divided into 22 villages and one community, including: Lifuta Community, Chixi Village, Qinglong Village, Chenjiawan Village, Huangjiayuan Village, Yejiafang Village, Yangxiping Village, Maoshuixi Village, Sanchaxi Village, Jinjiatai Village, Songjiatai Village, Guanzhuang Village, Yanban Village, Shujiaping Village, Sanchawan Village, Liushupo Village, Liangjiaping Village, Baishexi Village, Guojiatai Village, Shui'erchang Village, Kuzhuhe Village, Shuidong Village, and Mianhuaya Village (利福塔社区、赤溪村、青龙村、陈家湾村、黄家院村、叶家方村、杨溪坪村、冒水溪村、三岔溪村、金家台村、宋家台村、官庄村、岩板村、舒家坪村、三岔弯村、柳树坡村、梁家坪村、白蛇溪村、郭家台村、水儿场村、苦竹河村、水洞村、棉花亚村).
