= Mihu, Sangzhi =

Mihu Township
- township

Chinese transcription(s)
  - Simplified: 汨湖乡
  - Traditional: 汨湖鄉
  - Pinyin: Mihu Xiang
- Location in China
- Coordinates: 29°27′30″N 110°28′03″E
- Country: China
- Province: Hunan
- city: Zhangjiajie
- County: Sangzhi County
- Time zone: UTC+8 (China Standard)
- Postal code: 427105
- Area code: 0744

Mihu Township (simplified Chinese: 汨湖乡; traditional Chinese: 汨湖鄉; pinyin: Mihu Xiang) is a rural township in Sangzhi County, Zhangjiajie, Hunan Province, China.

== Administrative divisions ==
The township is divided into 13 villages, which include the following areas: Yaofengjie Village, Jinfengjie Village, Anjiayu Village, Zoujiajie Village, Yejiaqiao Village, Xiaohanyu Village, Xianchiyu Village, Nianzibao Village, Huguo Village, Qiancunping Village, Baishi Village, Sanzijie Village, Guangwentai Village (姚风界村、金丰界村、安家峪村、邹家界村、叶家桥村、小汉峪村、咸池峪村、碾子包村、护国村、前村坪村、白石村、三子界村、广文台村).
