= Longtanping, Sangzhi =

Longtanping Town
- Town

Chinese transcription(s)
  - Simplified: 龙潭坪镇
  - Traditional: 龍潭坪鎮
  - Pinyin: Lóngtánpíng Zhèn
- Location in China
- Coordinates: 29°40′45″N 110°09′24″E
- Country: China
- Province: Hunan
- city: Zhangjiajie
- County: Sangzhi County

Area
  - Total: 256 km^{2} (99 sq mi)

Population
  - Total: 18,000
  - Density: 70/km^{2} (180/sq mi)
- Time zone: UTC+8 (China Standard)
- Postal code: 427107
- Area code: 0744

Longtanping Town (simplified Chinese: 龙潭坪镇; traditional Chinese: 龍潭坪鎮; pinyin: Lóngtánpíng Zhèn) is an urban town in Sangzhi County, Zhangjiajie, Hunan Province, China.

== Administrative divisions ==
The town is divided into 10 villages and 1 community, which include the following areas: Longtanping Community, Liujiajie Village, Zhuya Village, Yinfeng Village, Qiaotou Village, Baizhuping Village, Ganping Village, Lijiawan Village, Sanhejie Village, Maoya Village, and Yuntoushan Village (龙潭坪社区、刘家界村、竹亚村、银风村、桥头村、白竹坪村、赶坪村、李家湾村、三合街村、毛亚村、云头山村).
