= Liaojiacun =

Liaojiacun Town
- Town

Chinese transcription(s)
  - Simplified: 廖家村镇
  - Traditional: 廖家村鎮
  - Pinyin: Liàojiācūn Zhèn
- Location in China
- Coordinates: 29°23′26″N 109°59′31″E
- Country: China
- Province: Hunan
- city: Zhangjiajie
- County: Sangzhi County

Area
  - Total: 205 km^{2} (79 sq mi)

Population
  - Total: 30,000
  - Density: 150/km^{2} (380/sq mi)
- Time zone: UTC+8 (China Standard)
- Postal code: 427111
- Area code: 0744

Liaojiacun Town (simplified Chinese: 廖家村镇; traditional Chinese: 廖家村鎮; pinyin: Liàojiācūn Zhèn) is an urban town in Sangzhi County, Zhangjiajie, Hunan Province, China.

== Administrative divisions ==
The town is divided into 9 villages and 2 communities, which include the following areas: Liaojiacun Community, Miaozhai Community, Mojiata Village, Chongwangxi Village, erhutian Village, Zhaigongta Village, Zajia Village, Laozhuangpo Village, Yaoqidong Village, Fengyan Village, and Maiozixi Village (廖家村社区、苗寨社区、莫家塔村、冲王溪村、二户田村、斋公塔村、咱家村、老庄坡村、妖气洞村、丰岩村、猫子溪村).
