= Kongkeshu =

Rural township in Hunan province, China

Kongkeshu Township
- township

Chinese transcription(s)
  - Simplified: 空壳树乡
  - Traditional: 空殼樹鄉
  - Pinyin: Kōngkéshù Xiāng
- Location in China
- Coordinates: 29°26′14″N 110°20′27″E
- Country: China
- Province: Hunan
- city: Zhangjiajie
- County: Sangzhi County
- Time zone: UTC+8 (China Standard)
- Postal code: 427101
- Area code: 0744

Kongkeshu Township (simplified Chinese: 空壳树乡; traditional Chinese: 空殼樹鄉; pinyin: Kōngkéshù Xiāng) is a rural township in Sangzhi County, Zhangjiajie, Hunan Province, China.The township is known for its mountainous terrain and natural beauty, making it a potential site for eco-tourism and rural tourism development. It consists of 14 villages, each with its own local customs and agricultural practices.

== Administrative divisions ==
The township is divided into 14 villages, which include the following areas: Miaoyu Village, Huxing Village, Chenjiaping Village, Longhushan Village, Qiaoziyu Village, Shijiawan Village, Kongjun Village, Liufangya Village, Lianhuatai Village, Tudiya Village, Luojiaping Village, Baimaquan Village, Ranjiaping Village, and Tangxiyu Village (庙峪村、虎形村、陈家坪村、龙虎山村、桥子峪村、石家湾村、空军村、六方亚村、莲花台村、土地亚村、罗家坪村、白马泉村、冉家坪村、汤溪峪村).
