= Changtanping =

Changtanping Township
- township

Chinese transcription(s)
  - Simplified: 长潭坪乡
  - Traditional: 長潭坪鄉
  - Pinyin: Changtanping Xiang
- Location in China
- Coordinates: 29°41′36″N 110°28′28″E
- Country: China
- Province: Hunan
- city: Zhangjiajie
- County: Sangzhi County

Population
  - Total: 4,400
- Time zone: UTC+8 (China Standard)
- Postal code: 427102
- Area code: 0744

Changtanping Township (simplified Chinese: 长潭坪乡; traditional Chinese: 長潭坪鄉; pinyin: Changtanping Xiang) is a rural township in Sangzhi County, Zhangjiajie, Hunan Province, China.

== Administrative divisions ==
The township is divided into 8 villages, which include the following areas: Shuiliu Village, Lujiashan Village, Chishiping Village, Changtanping Village, Changtanping Village, Linjiabao Village, Shuazhuxi Village, Tianyanchi Village, and Hongyanshan Village (水流村、路家山村、赤石坪村、长潭坪村、林家包村、刷注溪村、天眼池村、红岩山村).
