= Huanglong Cave =

Karst cave in Wulingyuan, Zhangjiajie, China

Coordinates: 29°16′0″N 110°22′0″E

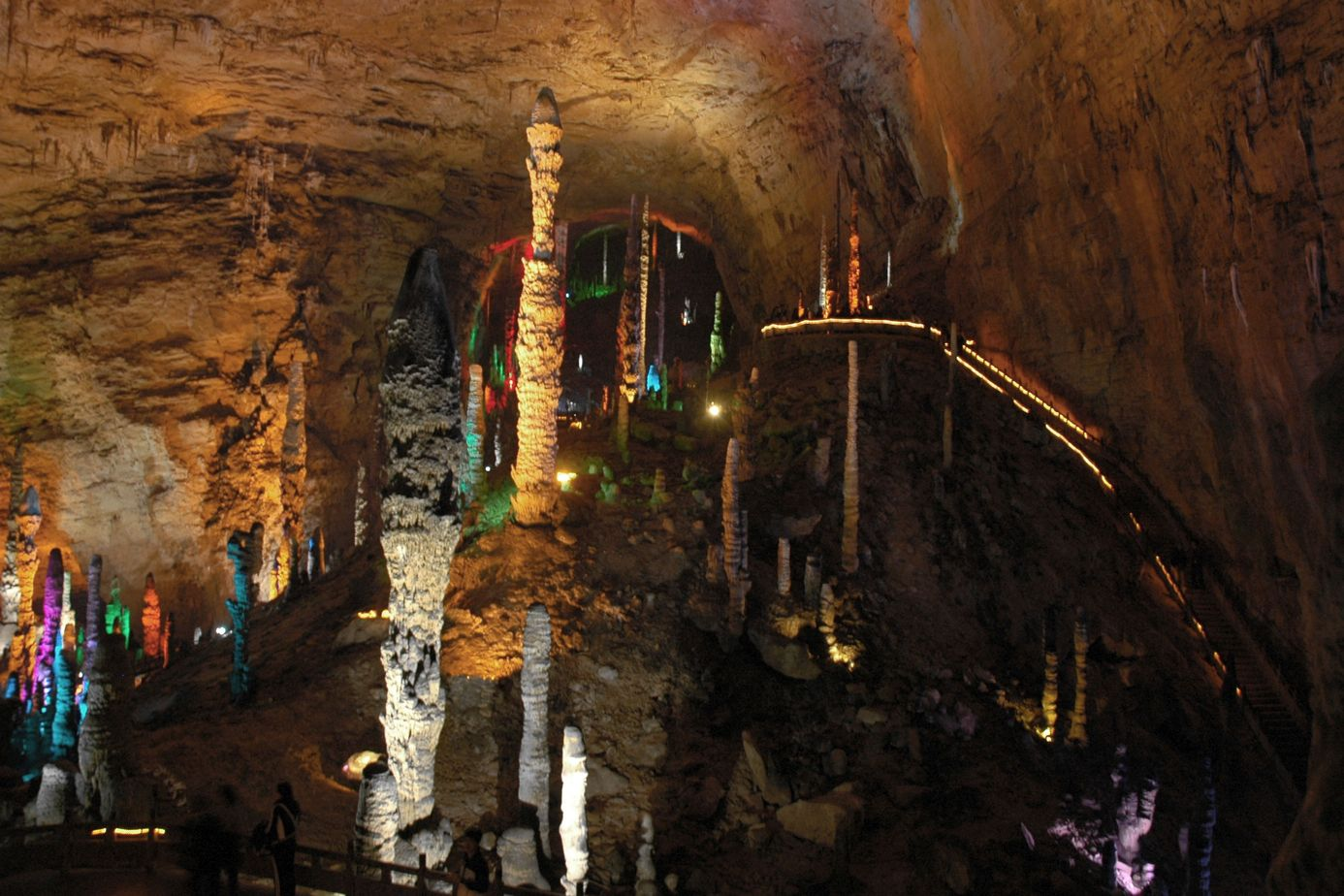
- The Dragon King's Palace, Huanglong Cave (黄龙洞龙宫)
- Interactive map of Huanglong Cave
- Location: Wulingyuan District, Zhangjiajie City, Hunan, People's Republic of China

Huanglong Cave (simplified Chinese: 黄龙洞; traditional Chinese: 黃龍洞; pinyin: huánglóng dòng; lit. 'yellow dragon cave') is a karst cave located in Wulingyuan District, Zhangjiajie City, Hunan, People's Republic of China and a national 4A rated scenic area. As of 2010, the cave has over a million visitors per year. Since 1997, the Huanglong Cave scenic area has been managed by Beijing-based China Datong Co. Ltd. It was previously managed directly by the Hunan provincial government.

In addition to the cave itself the Huanglong Cave scenic area includes Huanglong Cave Ecology Square (simplified Chinese: 黄龙洞生态广场; traditional Chinese: 黃龍洞生態廣場), completed in 2009 by restoring the landscape of the area adjacent to the cave entrance. In 2010, the Zhangjiajie government ordered the construction of the "Hallelujah Concert Hall" (simplified Chinese: 哈利路亚音乐厅; traditional Chinese: 哈利路亞音樂廳) as the centerpiece to the Ecology Square, not far from the cave entrance. The hall has a grass-planted roof and cost 160 million Chinese yuan.

== Features ==
Covering a total area of 48 ha (120 acres), the cave system extends to 15 km (9.3 mi) in length and is divided into dry and wet levels. There are four levels, thirteen chambers, three underground waterfalls, two underground rivers, three pools, ninety-six passages, as well as an underground lake. The largest chamber in the cave is 4,000 m^{2} (43,000 sq ft) and the highest of the three waterfalls is 50 m (160 ft) high. The guided tour through the cave lasts about two hours and includes a boat ride down one of the underground rivers.

== 2025 clean-up ==
In the area are many more karst caves. Footage that hit of the caves filled with garbage, went viral in May 2025, led to a vast clean-up operation, in which up to June 9, 2025, 51 tons of garbage have been cleared.

== See also ==
- List of caves in China
- Zhangjiajie National Forest Park
