= Baishi, Sangzhi =

Baishi Township
- township

Chinese transcription(s)
  - Simplified: 白石乡
  - Traditional: 白石鄉
  - Pinyin: Baishi Xiang
- Location in China
- Coordinates: 29°42′08″N 110°35′03″E
- Country: China
- Province: Hunan
- city: Zhangjiajie
- County: Sangzhi County

Area
  - Total: 121 km^{2} (47 sq mi)

Population
  - Total: 5,600
  - Density: 46/km^{2} (120/sq mi)
- Time zone: UTC+8 (China Standard)
- Postal code: 427110
- Area code: 0744

Baishi Township (simplified Chinese: 白石乡; traditional Chinese: 白石鄉; pinyin: Baishi Xiang) is a rural township in Sangzhi County, Zhangjiajie, Hunan Province, China.

== Administrative divisions ==
The township is divided into 12 villages, which include the following areas: Lianhua Village, Liping Village, Qiaogou Village, Shuangshi Village, Yanmen Village, Baishi Village, Gu Village, Liaocheng Village, Xinhua Village, Changyi Village, Longquan Village, and Yanlu Village (莲花村、李坪村、桥沟村、双狮村、岩门村、白石村、谷村、廖城村、新华村、长益村、龙泉村、岩路村).
