= Liangshuikou =

Liangshuikou Town
- Town

Chinese transcription(s)
  - Simplified: 凉水口镇
  - Traditional: 涼水口鎮
  - Pinyin: Liángshuǐkǒu Zhèn
- Location in China
- Coordinates: 29°32′37″N 110°05′48″E
- Country: China
- Province: Hunan
- city: Zhangjiajie
- County: Sangzhi County

Area
  - Total: 68.7 km^{2} (26.5 sq mi)

Population
  - Total: 10,000
  - Density: 150/km^{2} (380/sq mi)
- Time zone: UTC+8 (China Standard)
- Postal code: 427109
- Area code: 0744

Liangshuikou Town (simplified Chinese: 凉水口镇; traditional Chinese: 涼水口鎮; pinyin: Liángshuǐkǒu Zhèn) is an urban town in Sangzhi County, Zhangjiajie, Hunan Province, China.

== Administrative divisions ==
The town is divided into 16 villages and 1 community, which include the following areas: Nanmugang Community, Chayuanta Village, Quanmenkou Village, Bajiaowan Village, Tanmuta Village, Shengjipo Village, Xiejiapo Village, Yao'erping Village, Pengjiatai Village, Zhangjiata Village, Hanjiaping Village, Lijiazhuang Village, Xiajiayu Village, Maliuwan Village, Yulanxi Village, renshengping Village, and Sicengjie Village (楠木岗社区、茶元塔村、泉门口村、芭蕉湾村、檀木塔村、生基坡村、谢家坡村、尧儿坪村、彭家台村、张家塔村、韩家坪村、李家庄村、夏家峪村、麻六湾村、渔兰溪村、人生坪村、四层界村).
