= Lianghekou, Sangzhi =

Lianghekou Township
- township

Chinese transcription(s)
  - Simplified: 两河口乡
  - Traditional: 兩河口鄉
  - Pinyin: Lianghekou Xiang
- Location in China
- Coordinates: 29°27′12″N 110°01′49″E
- Country: China
- Province: Hunan
- city: Zhangjiajie
- County: Sangzhi County

Area
  - Total: 42 km^{2} (16 sq mi)

Population
  - Total: 9,100
  - Density: 220/km^{2} (560/sq mi)
- Time zone: UTC+8 (China Standard)
- Postal code: 427111
- Area code: 0744

Lianghekou Township (simplified Chinese: 两河口乡; traditional Chinese: 兩河口鄉; pinyin: Lianghekou Xiang) is a rural township in Sangzhi County, Zhangjiajie, Hunan Province, China.

== Administrative divisions ==
The township is divided into 14 villages, which include the following areas: Baizhuke Village, Zhangjia Village, Guanping Village, Yanbi Village, Zhujiagou Village, Tianjia Village, Xiadongjie Village, Wudutan Village, Bijia Village, Lianghekou Village, Tankou Village, Jiujie Village, Lishanpo Village, and Gexi Village (白竹科村、张家村、官坪村、岩壁村、朱家沟村、田家村、下洞街村、五渡潭村、笔家村、两河口村、潭口村、旧街村、栗山坡村、格溪村).
