= Linxihe =

Linxihe Township
- township

Chinese transcription(s)
  - Simplified: 淋溪河乡
  - Traditional: 淋溪河鄉
  - Pinyin: Linxihe Xiang
- Location in China
- Coordinates: 29°38′03″N 110°21′56″E
- Country: China
- Province: Hunan
- city: Zhangjiajie
- County: Sangzhi County
- Time zone: UTC+8 (China Standard)
- Postal code: 427103
- Area code: 0744

Linxihe Township (simplified Chinese: 淋溪河乡; traditional Chinese: 淋溪河鄉; pinyin: Linxihe Xiang) is a rural township in Sangzhi County, Zhangjiajie, Hunan Province, China.

== Administrative divisions ==
The township is divided into 11 villages, which include the following areas: Zongshuyu Village, Linxiyuan Village, Zhangjiapu Village, Tianping Village, Jiahe Village, Siwei Village, Tianwan Village, Jianfengshan Village, Ma'anhui Village, Dadongxi Village, and Lutangwan Village (棕树峪村、淋溪源村、张家铺村、田坪村、夹河村、四围村、田湾村、尖丰山村、马安会村、大洞溪村、卢塘湾村).
