= Guluoshan =

Guluoshan Township
- township

Chinese transcription(s)
  - Simplified: 谷罗山乡
  - Traditional: 谷羅山鄉
  - Pinyin: Guluoshan Xiang
- Location in China
- Coordinates: 29°35′02″N 110°10′56″E
- Country: China
- Province: Hunan
- city: Zhangjiajie
- County: Sangzhi County
- Time zone: UTC+8 (China Standard)
- Postal code: 427109
- Area code: 0744

Guluoshan Township (simplified Chinese: 谷罗山乡; traditional Chinese: 谷羅山鄉; pinyin: Guluoshan Xiang) is a rural township in Sangzhi County, Zhangjiajie, Hunan Province, China.

== Administrative divisions ==
The township is divided into 13 villages, which include the following areas: Liujiahe Village, Zhuojiaping Village, Luotan Village, Houjiabao Village, Sunjiatai Village, Xuetangbao Village, Zhoujiabao Village, Babatian Village, Gufengshan Village, Guluoshan Village, Hejiatian Village, Niudongkou Village, and Qingwan Village (刘家河村、卓家坪村、罗谭村、候家包村、孙家台村、学堂包村、周家包村、粑粑田村、谷峰山村、谷罗山村、何家田村、牛洞口村、清弯村).
