= Hekou, Sangzhi =

Hekou Township
- township

Chinese transcription(s)
  - Simplified: 河口乡
  - Traditional: 河口鄉
  - Pinyin: Hékǒu Xiāng
- Location in China
- Coordinates: 29°33′03″N 109°51′37″E
- Country: China
- Province: Hunan
- city: Zhangjiajie
- County: Sangzhi County
- Time zone: UTC+8 (China Standard)
- Postal code: 427110
- Area code: 0744

Hekou Township (simplified Chinese: 河口乡; traditional Chinese: 河口鄉; pinyin: Hékǒu Xiāng) is a rural township in Sangzhi County, Zhangjiajie, Hunan Province, China.

== Administrative divisions ==
The township is divided into 20 villages, which include the following areas: Kexi Village, Dongshi Village, Hekou Village, Chaqi Village, Fuxi Village, Zajia Village, Maluo Village, Yangwan Village, Liangcha Village, Qianmin Village, Xinnan Village, Xiping Village, Linxing Village, Shazhou Village, Taiping Village, Tangfang Village, Shenzhou Village, Shangping Village, Xiaping Village, and Chaodong Village (科溪村、懂市村、河口村、插旗村、富溪村、咱家村、马骆村、杨湾村、两岔村、千民村、新南村、西坪村、林兴村、沙洲村、太坪村、塘方村、神州村、上坪村、下坪村、朝东村).
