= Furongqiao =

Furongqiao Township
- township

Chinese transcription(s)
  - Simplified: 芙蓉桥白族乡
  - Traditional: 芙蓉橋白族鄉
  - Pinyin: Furongqiao Xiang
- Location in China
- Coordinates: 29°30′42″N 110°17′45″E
- Country: China
- Province: Hunan
- city: Zhangjiajie
- County: Sangzhi County

Area
  - Total: 108 km^{2} (42 sq mi)

Population
  - Total: 13,200
  - Density: 122/km^{2} (317/sq mi)
- Time zone: UTC+8 (China Standard)
- Postal code: 427103
- Area code: 0744

Furongqiao Township (simplified Chinese: 芙蓉桥白族乡; traditional Chinese: 芙蓉橋白族鄉; pinyin: Furongqiao Xiang) is a rural township in Sangzhi County, Zhangjiajie, Hunan Province, China.

== Administrative divisions ==
The township is divided into 13 villages, which include the following areas: Gaoyang Village, Fujianpo Village, Tuojiagang Village, Hai'eryu Village, Liaoping Village, Wawuping Village, Yinxing Village, Furongqiao Village, Meijiaqiao Village, Hequn Village, Xingwang Village, Dazhuangping Village, and Hujiayu Village (高杨村、福建坡村、庹家岗村、海儿峪村、廖坪村、瓦屋坪村、银星村、芙蓉桥村、梅家桥村、鹤群村、兴旺村、大庄坪村、胡家峪村).
