= Sangzhi County =

Sangzhi County 桑植县 Sangchih
- County
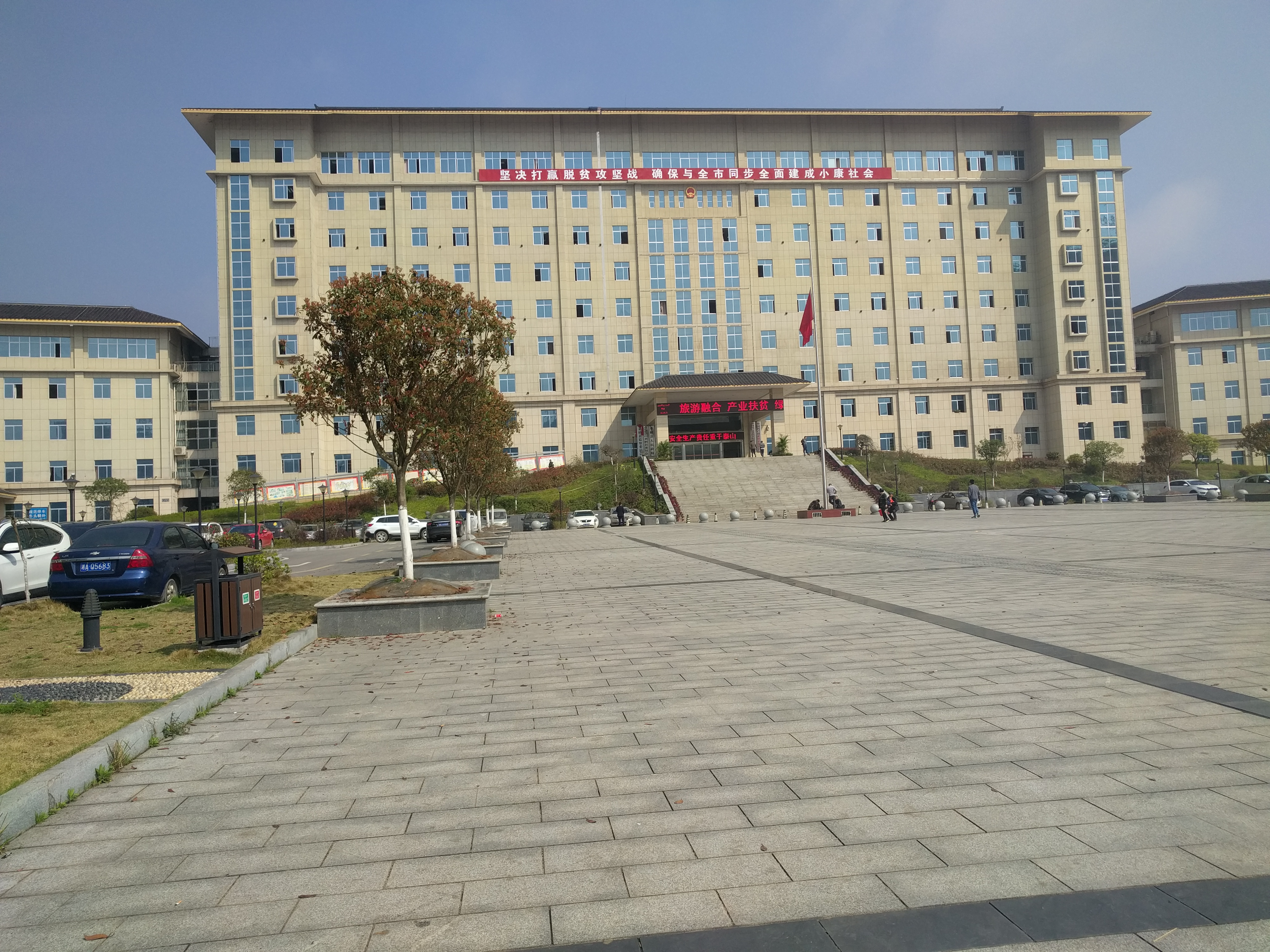

- Location of Sangzhi County within Zhangjiajie

- Location in Hunan
- Coordinates: 29°23′49″N 110°10′01″E
- Country: People's Republic of China
- Province: Hunan
- Prefecture-level city: Zhangjiajie

Area
  - Total: 3,475.19 km^{2} (1,341.78 sq mi)

Population
  - Total: 376,100
  - Density: 108.2/km^{2} (280.3/sq mi)
- Time zone: UTC+8 (China Standard)
- Website: http://www.sangzhi.gov.cn/

Sangzhi (simplified Chinese: 桑植县; traditional Chinese: 桑植縣; pinyin: Sāngzhí Xiàn) is a county in Hunan Province, China, under the administration of the prefecture-level city of Zhangjiajie. Located on the northern margin of Hunan, Sangzhi County is bordered to the east by Cili County, to the south by Yongding and Wulingyuan Districts, to the west by Yongshun and Longshan Counties, and to the north by Xuan'en and Hefeng Counties in Hubei province.

Sangzhi county is home to several ethnic groups, including the Tujia, Miao, and Bai people. The County covers an area of 3,474 square kilometres (1,341 sq mi) and had a population of approximately 479,500 as of 2015. As on 27 November 2015, It was divided into 23 township-level division divisions, with its county seat located in Liyuan Town (澧源镇).

== History ==
Migrant workers from Sangzhi have been employed as drillers during the construction boom in Shenzhen, contributing to the emergence of

Kuzhu Village, which features architecture dating to the Ming and Qing Dynasties, is noted for its folk music and local cultural traditions.

The former residence of Marshal He Long is located in Hongjiaguan Township, Sangzhi County.

== Geography ==
Terrain in the county is predominantly mountainous. The county is home to the Lishui River, the Badagong Mountain National Nature Reserve, and Jiutian Cave. Owing to the steep gradient of the Lishui River in its upper reaches, floods can occur rapidly, with sudden rises in water levels. As a result, the county has experienced frequent flash flooding and drainage problems in urban areas.

Flood control projects began in the 1980s. Planners seek to raise the county's flood-control standard from 2-year-occurrence to 20-year-occurrence, and resettle households located in vulnerable areas.

"From 2010–2018, cultivated land, forest land, waters, and urban and rural construction land in Sangzhi County increased by 4.91%, 0.03%, 58.99%, and 55.63%, respectively, and grassland decreased by 13.32%."

Rana sangzhiensis is a frog that was described as a new species for science from Sangzhi.

== Climate ==
Climate data for Sangzhi, elevation 322 m (1,056 ft), (1991–2020 normals, extremes 1981–present)
| Month | Jan | Feb | Mar | Apr | May | Jun | Jul | Aug | Sep | Oct | Nov | Dec | Year |
|---|---|---|---|---|---|---|---|---|---|---|---|---|---|
| Record high °C (°F) | 21.3 (70.3) | 27.8 (82.0) | 33.4 (92.1) | 36.4 (97.5) | 35.8 (96.4) | 38.1 (100.6) | 39.6 (103.3) | 40.7 (105.3) | 37.7 (99.9) | 34.2 (93.6) | 28.5 (83.3) | 22.5 (72.5) | 40.7 (105.3) |
| Mean daily maximum °C (°F) | 8.7 (47.7) | 11.4 (52.5) | 16.3 (61.3) | 22.5 (72.5) | 26.4 (79.5) | 29.3 (84.7) | 32.2 (90.0) | 32.5 (90.5) | 28.2 (82.8) | 22.2 (72.0) | 16.9 (62.4) | 11.2 (52.2) | 21.5 (70.7) |
| Daily mean °C (°F) | 4.9 (40.8) | 7.2 (45.0) | 11.3 (52.3) | 16.8 (62.2) | 21.0 (69.8) | 24.4 (75.9) | 26.9 (80.4) | 26.8 (80.2) | 22.8 (73.0) | 17.2 (63.0) | 12.0 (53.6) | 7.0 (44.6) | 16.5 (61.7) |
| Mean daily minimum °C (°F) | 2.3 (36.1) | 4.2 (39.6) | 7.7 (45.9) | 12.8 (55.0) | 17.2 (63.0) | 20.9 (69.6) | 23.3 (73.9) | 22.9 (73.2) | 19.2 (66.6) | 14.1 (57.4) | 8.9 (48.0) | 4.0 (39.2) | 13.1 (55.6) |
| Record low °C (°F) | −5.6 (21.9) | −4.4 (24.1) | −1.2 (29.8) | 2.2 (36.0) | 9.5 (49.1) | 12.0 (53.6) | 17.0 (62.6) | 14.8 (58.6) | 12.0 (53.6) | 4.7 (40.5) | −1.8 (28.8) | −4.2 (24.4) | −5.6 (21.9) |
| Average precipitation mm (inches) | 40.8 (1.61) | 49.6 (1.95) | 73.8 (2.91) | 130.4 (5.13) | 199.4 (7.85) | 244.9 (9.64) | 261.8 (10.31) | 143.2 (5.64) | 107.0 (4.21) | 101.5 (4.00) | 64.2 (2.53) | 24.6 (0.97) | 1,441.2 (56.75) |
| Average precipitation days (≥ 0.1 mm) | 11.5 | 11.8 | 14.1 | 14.8 | 16.6 | 15.9 | 15.1 | 12.5 | 11.0 | 13.1 | 11.8 | 9.8 | 158 |
| Average snowy days | 5.3 | 2.5 | 1.1 | 0 | 0 | 0 | 0 | 0 | 0 | 0 | 0.2 | 1.4 | 10.5 |
| Average relative humidity (%) | 78 | 76 | 76 | 77 | 80 | 82 | 81 | 78 | 78 | 81 | 81 | 77 | 79 |
| Mean monthly sunshine hours | 46.9 | 49.2 | 73.5 | 98.3 | 105.2 | 98.6 | 150.3 | 164.1 | 111.7 | 84.2 | 71.6 | 57.8 | 1,111.4 |
| Percentage possible sunshine | 14 | 15 | 20 | 25 | 25 | 24 | 35 | 41 | 30 | 24 | 22 | 18 | 24 |
Source: China Meteorological Administration

== Administrative divisions ==
According to the result on adjustment of township-level administrative divisions of Sangzhi County on November 27, 2015, it has 12 towns and 11 townships (five of which are ethnic townships of Bai people) under its jurisdiction. Its county seat is Liyuan (澧源). They are:

12 Towns (镇)

- Ruitapu (瑞塔铺)
- Liyuan (澧源)
- Lifuta (利福塔)
- Liaojiacun (廖家村)
- Longtanping (龙潭坪): formed by merging the former Sifangxi Township (四方溪乡), Kuzhuping Township (苦竹坪乡) and the former Longtanping Town (龙潭坪镇)
- Wudaoshui (五道水): formed by merging the former Bamaoxi Township (芭茅溪乡) and the former Wudaoshui Town (五道水镇)
- Renchaoxi (人潮溪): formed by merging the former Xilian Township (西莲乡), Renchaoxi Township (人潮溪乡) and 9 villages of the former Baishi Township.
- Guandiping (官地坪): formed by merging the former Changtanping Township (长潭坪乡), the former Guandiping Town (官地坪镇), 3 villages of the former Baishi Township and Huangshanyu Village (黄山峪村) of the former Maidiping Township
- Chenjiahe (陈家河): formed by merging the former Chenjiahe Town (陈家河镇), Lianghekou Township (两河口乡), Yanwukou Township (岩屋口乡) and 3 villages of the former Jianjiapo Township (蹇家坡乡).
- Badagongshan (八大公山): formed by merging the former Badagongshan Township (八大公山乡), Xishaping Township (细砂坪乡) and 10 villages of the former Jianjiapo Township (蹇家坡乡).
- Liangshuikou (凉水口): formed by merging the former Liangshuikou Town (凉水口镇) and 5 villages of the former Guluoshan Township (蹇家坡乡)
- Qiaoziwan (桥自弯): formed by merging the former Qiaoziwan Township (桥自弯乡) and 8 villages of the former Guluoshan Township (蹇家坡乡).

6 Townships (乡)

- Zhuyeping (竹叶坪)
- Kongkeshu (空壳树)
- Shangdongjie (上洞街)
- Hekou (河口)
- Shanghexi (上河溪)
- Shataping (沙塔坪)

5 Bai Ethnic townships (白族乡)

- Zoumaping (走马坪), formed by merging the former Mihu and Zoumaping Townships
- Liujiaping (刘家坪)
- Hongjiaguan (洪家关), formed by merging the former Daguquan (打鼓泉乡) and Hongjiaguan Townships (洪家关乡)
- Furongqiao (芙蓉桥), formed by merging the former Linxihe (淋溪河白族乡) and Furongqiao Townships (芙蓉桥白族乡)
- Mahekou (马合口): formed by merging the former Mahekou Township (马合口) and 7 villages of the former Maidiping Township (麦地坪白族乡)

== Notable residents ==
- Marshal He Long, a leader of the Long March, attended school in Hongjiaguan Village.

== See also ==
- Wanmin
- Yujiazui
