= Liujiaping, Sangzhi =

Liujiaping Township
- township

Chinese transcription(s)
  - Simplified: 刘家坪白族乡
  - Traditional: 劉家坪白族鄉
  - Pinyin: Liujiaping Xiang
- Location in China
- Coordinates: 29°27′33″N 110°13′53″E
- Country: China
- Province: Hunan
- city: Zhangjiajie
- County: Sangzhi County

Area
  - Total: 38.2 km^{2} (14.7 sq mi)

Population
  - Total: 12,000
  - Density: 310/km^{2} (810/sq mi)
- Time zone: UTC+8 (China Standard)
- Postal code: 427101
- Area code: 0744

Liujiaping Township (simplified Chinese: 刘家坪白族乡; traditional Chinese: 劉家坪白族鄉; pinyin: Liujiaping Xiang) is a rural township in Sangzhi County, Zhangjiajie, Hunan Province, China.

== Administrative divisions ==
The township is divided into 13 villages, which include the following areas: Yingzishan Village, Shuangxiqiao Village, Gaojiaping Village, Village, Tangjiaqiao Village, Zhujita Village, Shuangyuanping Village, Xiongjiawan Village, Liujiaping Village, Tian'erya Village, Chaoyangdi Village, Xinqiao Village, Guanxijian Village, and Wantianyu Village (英子山村、双溪桥村、高家坪村、唐家桥村、朱机塔村、双元坪村、熊家湾村、刘家坪村、田儿亚村、朝阳地村、新桥村、关溪涧村、晚田峪村).
