= Yanwukou =

Yanwukou Township
- township

Chinese transcription(s)
  - Simplified: 岩屋口乡
  - Traditional: 巖屋口鄉
  - Pinyin: Yanwukou Xiang
- Location in China
- Coordinates: 29°30′03″N 109°54′49″E
- Country: China
- Province: Hunan
- city: Zhangjiajie
- County: Sangzhi County
- Time zone: UTC+8 (China Standard)
- Postal code: 427110
- Area code: 0744

Yanwukou Township (simplified Chinese: 岩屋口乡; traditional Chinese: 巖屋口鄉; pinyin: Yanwukou Xiang) is a rural township in Sangzhi County, Zhangjiajie, Hunan Province, China.

== Administrative divisions ==
The township is divided into 9 villages, which include the following areas: Banzhu Village, Yanwukou Village, Shaheping Village, Lujiata Village, Longjiaping Village, Daweiba Village, Sabuxi Village, Sijiatian Village, and Wujiatian Village (班竹村、岩屋口村、沙河坪村、陆家塔村、龙家坪村、大尾坝村、撒埠溪村、四家田村、五家田村).
