= Hongjiaguan =

Hongjiaguan Township
- township

Chinese transcription(s)
  - Simplified: 洪家关白族乡
  - Traditional: 洪家關白族鄉
  - Pinyin: Hongjiaguan Xiang
- Location in China
- Coordinates: 29°28′37″N 110°09′41″E
- Country: China
- Province: Hunan
- city: Zhangjiajie
- County: Sangzhi County
- Time zone: UTC+8 (China Standard)
- Postal code: 427113
- Area code: 0744

Hongjiaguan Township (simplified Chinese: 洪家关白族乡; traditional Chinese: 洪家關白族鄉; pinyin: Hongjiaguan Xiang) is a rural township in Sangzhi County, Zhangjiajie, Hunan Province, China.

== Administrative divisions ==
The township is divided into 25 villages, which include the following areas: Liaojiarong Village, Longtou Village, Xiaohekou Village, Lijiaping Village, Nancha Village, Huilong Village, Huaxiangyu Village, Hexiyu Village, Fengping Village, Yaochongyu Village, Yunfeng Village, Quanyu Village, Hongjiaguan Village, Xinglong Village, Huayuan Village, Dujiashan Village, Longdongya Village, Yangliuchi Village, Yutianping Village, Shenglong Village, Hailong Village, Qiwan Village, Shizhuping Village, Sanwuluo Village, and Yinxingta Village (廖家溶村、龙头村、小河口村、李家坪村、南岔村、回龙村、化香峪村、鹤溪峪村、风坪村、尧充峪村、云丰村、泉峪村、洪家关村、兴隆村、花园村、杜家山村、龙洞亚村、杨柳池村、余田坪村、胜龙村、海龙村、七湾村、实竹坪村、三屋逻村、银杏塔村).

== Notable residents ==
The former residence of Marshal He Long, a leader of the Long March, is located in the township. He Long attended school in Hongjiaguan Village. A Red Army primary school in village has been dedicated to him.
