= Badagongshan =

Badagongshan Township
- Township

Chinese transcription(s)
  - Simplified: 八大公山乡
  - Traditional: 八大公山鄉
  - Pinyin: Bādàgōngshān Xiāng
- Location in China
- Coordinates: 29°39′54″N 109°49′08″E
- Country: China
- Province: Hunan
- city: Zhangjiajie
- County: Sangzhi County

Area
  - Total: 158 km^{2} (61 sq mi)

Population
  - Total: 4,700
  - Density: 30/km^{2} (77/sq mi)
- Time zone: UTC+8 (China Standard)
- Postal code: 427106
- Area code: 0744

Badagongshan Township (simplified Chinese: 八大公山乡; traditional Chinese: 八大公山鄉; pinyin: Bādàgōngshān Xiāng) is a rural township in Sangzhi County, Zhangjiajie, Hunan Province, China.

== Administrative divisions ==
The township is divided into 10 villages, which include the following areas: Chedahe Village, Zhujiawan Village, Bahe Village, Lishuwan Village, Jiangjiawan Village, Shadiping Village, Zhonggouwan Village, Neibanpo Village, Zhuang'erping Village, and Yaocaichang Village (车大河村、朱家湾村、扒河村、栗树湾村、蒋家湾村、砂地坪村、中沟湾村、内半坡村、庄耳坪村、药材场村).
