= Shataping, Sangzhi =

Shataping Township
- township

Chinese transcription(s)
  - Simplified: 沙塔坪乡
  - Traditional: 沙塔坪鄉
  - Pinyin: Shātǎpíng Xiāng
- Location in China
- Coordinates: 29°35′25″N 110°02′19″E
- Country: China
- Province: Hunan
- city: Zhangjiajie
- County: Sangzhi County

Area
  - Total: 132.5 km^{2} (51.2 sq mi)

Population
  - Total: 16,000
  - Density: 120/km^{2} (310/sq mi)
- Time zone: UTC+8 (China Standard)
- Postal code: 427108
- Area code: 0744

Shataping Township (simplified Chinese: 沙塔坪乡; traditional Chinese: 沙塔坪鄉; pinyin: Shātǎpíng Xiāng) is a rural township in Sangzhi County, Zhangjiajie, Hunan Province, China.

== Administrative divisions ==
The township is divided into 25 villages, which include the following areas: Fenshuiling Village, Nigutian Village, Lengshuiyu Village, Dawankou Village, Liu'erkou Village, Tianping Village, Siyuanpo Village, Liaojiapo Village, Shataping Village, Nongkezhan Village, Yangjiaping Village, Huajiaoyuan Village, Xiangjiawan Village, Shuijingtai Village, Pengjiawan Village, Sajiapo Village, Chapankou Village, Shuitianyu Village, Dazhuang Village, Damutang Village, Pingta Village, Matianping Village, Tangjiazhuang Village, Yuanjiaqiao Village, and Wangjiaya Village (分水岭村、尼古田村、冷水峪村、大湾口村、六耳口村、天平村、四元坡村、廖家坡村、沙塔坪村、农科站村、杨家坪村、花椒圆村、向家湾村、水井台村、彭家湾村、洒家坡村、茶盘口村、水田峪村、大庄村、大木塘村、坪塔村、麻田坪村、唐家庄村、袁家桥村、汪家亚村).
