= Bamaoxi =

Bamaoxi Township
- township

Chinese transcription(s)
  - Simplified: 芭茅溪乡
  - Traditional: 芭茅溪鄉
  - Pinyin: Bamaoxi Xiang
- Location in China
- Coordinates: 29°40′22″N 110°01′28″E
- Country: China
- Province: Hunan
- city: Zhangjiajie
- County: Sangzhi County

Population
  - Total: 4,700
- Time zone: UTC+8 (China Standard)
- Postal code: 427106
- Area code: 0744

Bamaoxi Township (simplified Chinese: 芭茅溪乡; traditional Chinese: 芭茅溪鄉; pinyin: Bamaoxi Xiang) is a rural township in Sangzhi County, Zhangjiajie, Hunan Province, China.

== Administrative divisions ==
The township is divided into 10 villages, which include the following areas: Nanmuping Village, Bamaoxi Village, Huangliantai Village, Miluohu Village, Liaozhuwan Village, Sangzhiping Village, Quheping Village, Shilipo Village, Yangjiawan Village, and Shuitianba Village (楠木坪村、黄连台村、芭茅溪村、汨落湖村、辽竹湾村、桑植坪村、取和平村、十里坡村、杨家湾村、水田坝村).
