= Jiaoziya =

Town in Hunan, China

Coordinates: 29°17′N 110°19′E

Jiaoziya (Chinese: 教字垭镇; pinyin: jiào-zì-yà zhèn) is a town in Yongding District, Zhangjiajie City, Hunan Province, China.
