= Yongding Subdistrict =

Subdistrict of Yongding District, Hunan, China

Coordinates: 29°7′47″N 110°28′54″E

Yongding Subdistrict (Chinese: 永定街道; pinyin: Xīxīpíng Jiēdào) is a subdistrict of Yongding District in Zhangjiajie Prefecture-level City, Hunan, China. The subdistrict was formed through dividing part of the former Yongding Town (Chinese: 永定镇) in 1985. It has an area of 5.19 km^{2} (2.00 sq mi) with a population of 64,947 (as of 2010 census).
