= Sifangxi =

Sifangxi Township
- township

Chinese transcription(s)
  - Simplified: 四方溪乡
  - Traditional: 四方溪鄉
  - Pinyin: Sifangxi Xiang
- Location in China
- Coordinates: 29°39′34″N 110°10′03″E
- Country: China
- Province: Hunan
- city: Zhangjiajie
- County: Sangzhi County
- Time zone: UTC+8 (China Standard)
- Postal code: 427107
- Area code: 0744

Sifangxi Township (simplified Chinese: 四方溪乡; traditional Chinese: 四方溪鄉; pinyin: Sifangxi Xiang) is a rural township in Sangzhi County, Zhangjiajie, Hunan Province, China.

== Administrative divisions ==
The township is divided into 10 villages, which include the following areas: Hongjiayu Village, Dadongbao Village, Zhaigongping Village, Xiangshuidong Village, Sifangxi Village, Bajiaoya Village, Shecangping Village, Chayuanping Village, Tachangping Village, and Pingtouyan Village (洪家峪村、大洞包村、斋公坪村、响水洞村、四方溪村、芭蕉亚村、社仓坪村、茶元坪村、塔场坪村、平头岩村).
