= Renchaoxi, Sangzhi =

Renchaoxi Township
- township

Chinese transcription(s)
  - Simplified: 人潮溪乡
  - Traditional: 人潮溪鄉
  - Pinyin: Réncháoxī Xiāng
- Location in China
- Coordinates: 29°37′05″N 110°36′04″E
- Country: China
- Province: Hunan
- city: Zhangjiajie
- County: Sangzhi County

Area
  - Total: 347 km^{2} (134 sq mi)

Population
  - Total: 20,000
  - Density: 58/km^{2} (150/sq mi)
- Time zone: UTC+8 (China Standard)
- Postal code: 427104
- Area code: 0744

Renchaoxi Township (simplified Chinese: 人潮溪乡; traditional Chinese: 人潮溪鄉; pinyin: Réncháoxī Xiāng) is a rural township in Sangzhi County, Zhangjiajie, Hunan Province, China.

== Administrative divisions ==
The township is divided into 11 villages, which include the following areas: Fenshuiling Village, Tongziyu Village, Yong'an Village, Xinglongping Village, Nandouxi Village, Heping Village, Hongqi Village, Taping Village, Chayewan Village, Meiziping Village, and Jinji Village (分水岭村、统子峪村、永安村、兴龙坪村、南斗溪村、和平村、红旗村、塔坪村、茶叶湾村、梅子坪村、金鸡村).
