= Wudaoshui, Sangzhi =

Wudaoshui Town
- Town

Chinese transcription(s)
  - Simplified: 五道水镇
  - Traditional: 五道水鎮
  - Pinyin: Wǔdàoshǔi Zhèn
- Location in China
- Coordinates: 29°42′10″N 109°55′01″E
- Country: China
- Province: Hunan
- city: Zhangjiajie
- County: Sangzhi County

Area
  - Total: 480 km^{2} (190 sq mi)

Population
  - Total: 24,000
  - Density: 50/km^{2} (130/sq mi)
- Time zone: UTC+8 (China Standard)
- Postal code: 427106
- Area code: 0744

Wudaoshui Township (simplified Chinese: 五道水镇; traditional Chinese: 五道水鎮; pinyin: Wǔdàoshǔi Zhèn) is an urban town in Sangzhi County, Zhangjiajie, Hunan Province, China.

== Administrative divisions ==
The town is divided into 10 villages and 2 community, which include the following areas: Wangjiaping Community, Tuanbao Community, Lianjiawan Village, Huayuquan Village, Chayuan Village, Chaye Village, Kuzhuba Village, Chajiaoxi Village, Yuanbaoxi Village, Wufengshan Village, Tuxidong Village, and Gaojiaping Village (汪家坪社区、团包社区、连家湾村、花渔泉村、茶元村、茶叶村、苦竹坝村、岔角溪村、元宝溪村、五峰山村、土溪洞村、高家平村).
