= Xishaping =

Xishaping Township
- township

Chinese transcription(s)
  - Simplified: 细沙坪乡
  - Traditional: 细沙坪鄉
  - Pinyin: Xishaping Xiang
- Location in China
- Coordinates: 29°39′09″N 109°51′42″E
- Country: China
- Province: Hunan
- city: Zhangjiajie
- County: Sangzhi County
- Time zone: UTC+8 (China Standard)
- Postal code: 427106
- Area code: 0744

Xishaping Township (simplified Chinese: 细沙坪乡; traditional Chinese: 细沙坪鄉; pinyin: Xishaping Xiang) is a rural township in Sangzhi County, Zhangjiajie, Hunan Province, China.

== Administrative divisions ==
The township is divided into 12 villages, which include the following areas: Yunhe Village, Zhuangjiaping Village, Jiangxiping Village, Maopo Village, Jiulong Village, Taiziping Village, Xishaping Village, Chaonanping Village, Zhoujiaya Village, Xujiaqiao Village, Bapipo Village, and Zhangjiatai Village (云合村、庄家坪村、江西坪村、茅坡村、九龙村、太子坪村、细沙坪村、朝南坪村、周家亚村、徐家桥村、八皮坡村、张家台村).
