= Kuzhuping =

Kuzhuping Township
- township

Chinese transcription(s)
  - Simplified: 苦竹坪乡
  - Traditional: 苦竹坪鄉
  - Pinyin: Kuzhuping Xiang
- Location in China
- Coordinates: 29°38′53″N 110°05′03″E
- Country: China
- Province: Hunan
- city: Zhangjiajie
- County: Sangzhi County

Area
  - Total: 50.55 km^{2} (19.52 sq mi)

Population
  - Total: 5,500
  - Density: 110/km^{2} (280/sq mi)
- Time zone: UTC+8 (China Standard)
- Postal code: 427107
- Area code: 0744

Kuzhuping Township (simplified Chinese: 苦竹坪乡; traditional Chinese: 苦竹坪鄉; pinyin: Kuzhuping Xiang) is a rural township in Sangzhi County, Zhangjiajie, Hunan Province, China.

== Administrative divisions ==
The township is divided into 11 villages, which include the following areas: Chenjiaya Village, Yinshiping Village, Jinzishan Village, Kayu Village, Shilongping Village, Zhangjiawan Village, Kuzhuping Village, Nongkezhan Village, Miaoerzhuang Village, Shiziping Village, and Guluojie Village (陈家亚村、银市坪村、金子山村、卡峪村、市龙坪村、张家湾村、苦竹坪村、农科站村、苗儿庄村、狮子坪村、古罗界村).
