= Xilian, Sangzhi =

Xilian Township
- township

Chinese transcription(s)
  - Simplified: 西莲乡
  - Traditional: 西蓮鄉
  - Pinyin: Xilian Xiang
- Location in China
- Coordinates: 29°40′43″N 110°43′26″E
- Country: China
- Province: Hunan
- city: Zhangjiajie
- County: Sangzhi County
- Time zone: UTC+8 (China Standard)
- Postal code: 427104
- Area code: 0744

Xilian Township (simplified Chinese: 西莲乡; traditional Chinese: 西蓮鄉; pinyin: Xilian Xiang) is a rural township in Sangzhi County, Zhangjiajie, Hunan Province, China.

== Administrative divisions ==
The township is divided into 10 villages, which include the following areas: Shimenya Village, Fenghe Village, Yueyan Village, Yujing Village, Zhongli Village, Jinzhu Village, Luoziling Village, Shuanglong Village, Shuanghe Village, and Liushu Village (石门亚村、丰合村、月岩村、玉京村、中里村、金竹村、罗子岭村、双龙村、双合村、柳树村).
