= Chenjiahe =

Chenjiahe Town
- Town

Chinese transcription(s)
  - Simplified: 陈家河镇
  - Traditional: 陳家河鎮
  - Pinyin: Chénjiāhé Zhèn
- Location in China
- Coordinates: 29°29′11″N 109°59′05″E
- Country: China
- Province: Hunan
- city: Zhangjiajie
- County: Sangzhi County

Area
  - Total: 17,000 km^{2} (6,600 sq mi)
- Time zone: UTC+8 (China Standard)
- Postal code: 427110
- Area code: 0744

Chenjiahe Town (simplified Chinese: 陈家河镇; traditional Chinese: 陳家河鎮; pinyin: Chénjiāhé Zhèn) is an urban town in Sangzhi County, Zhangjiajie, Hunan Province, China.

== Administrative divisions ==
The town is divided into 20 villages and 2 communities, which include the following areas: Qiaotou Community, Huangmutan Community, Caijiaping Village, Maota Village, Zhoujiawan Village, Chenjiawan Village, Yuanjiaping Village, Liujiawan Village, Pengjiata Village, Xinjie Village, Erdongping Village, Poufuxi Village, Tangjiaping Village, Chenjiahe Village, Ganxi Village, Longtangou Village, Changwan Village, Wujiawan Village, Cangguanyu Village, Banxi Village, Xiaojiaping Village, and Sanlanzi Village (桥头社区、黄木潭社区、蔡家坪村、毛塔村、周家弯村、陈家湾村、袁家坪村、刘家湾村、彭家塔村、新街村、二洞坪村、剖腹溪村、唐家坪村、陈家河村、干溪村、龙潭沟村、厂湾村、吴家湾村、苍关峪村、半溪村、肖家坪村、三兰子村).
