= Zhuyeping =

Zhuyeping Township
- township

Chinese transcription(s)
  - Simplified: 竹叶坪乡
  - Traditional: 竹葉坪鄉
  - Pinyin: Zhúyèpíng Xiāng
- Location in China
- Coordinates: 29°28′30″N 110°32′22″E
- Country: China
- Province: Hunan
- city: Zhangjiajie
- County: Sangzhi County

Area
  - Total: 274 km^{2} (106 sq mi)

Population
  - Total: 28,000
  - Density: 100/km^{2} (260/sq mi)
- Time zone: UTC+8 (China Standard)
- Postal code: 427105
- Area code: 0744

Zhuyeping Township (simplified Chinese: 竹叶坪乡; traditional Chinese: 竹葉坪鄉; pinyin: Zhúyèpíng Xiāng) is a rural township in Sangzhi County, Zhangjiajie, Hunan Province, China.

== Administrative divisions ==
The township is divided into 16 villages, which include the following areas: Zhengjiayu Village, Kangsanyu Village, Muyu Village, Liulangping Village, Chenzijie Village, Jigongya Village, Maohuajie Village, Chaya Village, Liushuta Village, Gandong Village, Qinyu Village, Sanbaidun Village, Majiaxi Village, Liuyangxi Village, Zhuyeping Village, and Nanhu Village.
