= Jianjiapo =

Jianjiapo Township
- township

Chinese transcription(s)
  - Simplified: 蹇家坡乡
  - Traditional: 蹇家坡鄉
  - Pinyin: Jianjiapo Xiang
- Location in China
- Coordinates: 29°33′19″N 109°57′20″E
- Country: China
- Province: Hunan
- city: Zhangjiajie
- County: Sangzhi County
- Time zone: UTC+8 (China Standard)
- Postal code: 427110
- Area code: 0744

Jianjiapo Township (simplified Chinese: 蹇家坡乡; traditional Chinese: 蹇家坡鄉; pinyin: Jianjiapo Xiang) is a rural township in Sangzhi County, Zhangjiajie, Hunan Province, China.

== Administrative divisions ==
The township is divided into 13 villages, which include the following areas: Xipaohe Village, Leijiapo Village, Wangjiata Village, Xiaoqichi Village, Jianjiapo Village, Nanmenpo Village, Lumaoping Village, Yaochang Village, Lijia Village, Yanluojie Village, Yanyuan Village, Lao Village, and Zhaojiata Village (洗泡河村、雷家坡村、王家塔村、宵淇池村、蹇家坡村、南门坡村、芦茅坪村、药厂村、李家村、燕落界村、茶园村民委员会、老村、赵家塔村).
