= Daguquan =

Daguquan Township
- township

Chinese transcription(s)
  - Simplified: 打鼓泉乡
  - Traditional: 打鼓泉鄉
  - Pinyin: Daguquan Xiang
- Location in China
- Coordinates: 29°27′34″N 110°06′03″E
- Country: China
- Province: Hunan
- city: Zhangjiajie
- County: Sangzhi County
- Time zone: UTC+8 (China Standard)
- Postal code: 427199
- Area code: 0744

Daguquan Township (simplified Chinese: 打鼓泉乡; traditional Chinese: 打鼓泉鄉; pinyin: Daguquan Xiang) is a rural township in Sangzhi County, Zhangjiajie, Hunan Province, China.

== Administrative divisions ==
The township is divided into 13 villages, which include the following areas: Tulanxi Village, Wangjiawan Village, Ganta Village, Jinjiapo Village, Xuehudong Village, Xiaofutou Village, Daguquan Village, Chenjiayuan Village, Huangjiawan Village, Liaojiayuan Village, Yushuping Village, Ercengjie Village, and Shuitianping Village (土兰溪村、王家湾村、赶塔村、金家坡村、穴虎洞村、小阜头村、打鼓泉村、陈家院村、黄家湾村、廖家院村、榆树坪村、二层界村、水田坪村).
