= Xixiping =

Subdistrict of Zhangjiajie, Hunan, China

Xixiping 西溪坪街道
- Subdistrict
- Location in Hunan
- Coordinates: 29°07′N 110°32′E
- Country: People's Republic of China
- Province: Hunan
- Prefecture-level city: Zhangjiajie
- District: Yongding
- Time zone: UTC+8 (China Standard)

Xixiping Subdistrict (Chinese: 西溪坪街道; pinyin: Xīxīpíng Jiēdào) is a subdistrict and the seat of Yongding District in Zhangjiajie Prefecture-level City, Hunan, China. The subdistrict was reformed through the amalgamation of six villages of Sancha Township (Chinese: 三岔乡) and the former Yongding Subdistrict on November 27, 2015. It has an area of 222.49 km^{2} (85.90 sq mi) with a population of 42,000 (as of 2015). Its seat is Xixiping Community (Chinese: 西溪坪社区).

== History ==
Xixiping was a part of the former Dongping Township (Chinese: 东坪乡) in 1949. Xixiping Commune (Chinese: 西溪坪公社) was formed in 1958 and reorganized as a township in 1984. The township was reorganized as a subdistrict in 1985. 11 villages of the former Guanmenyan Township (Chinese: 关门岩乡) and three villages of the former Tianmenshan Township (Chinese: 天门山乡) were merged to it in 1995. On November 27, 2015, six villages of the former Sancha Township (Chinese: 三岔乡) were amalgamated to the subdistrict.

== See also ==
- List of township-level divisions of Hunan
