= Maidiping =

Maidiping Township
- township

Chinese transcription(s)
  - Simplified: 麦地坪白族乡
  - Traditional: 麥地坪白族鄉
  - Pinyin: Maidiping Xiang
- Location in China
- Coordinates: 29°29′25″N 110°21′25″E
- Country: China
- Province: Hunan
- city: Zhangjiajie
- County: Sangzhi County

Area
  - Total: 50.4 km^{2} (19.5 sq mi)

Population
  - Total: 5,300
  - Density: 110/km^{2} (270/sq mi)
- Time zone: UTC+8 (China Standard)
- Postal code: 427103
- Area code: 0744

Maidiping Township (simplified Chinese: 麦地坪白族乡; traditional Chinese: 麥地坪白族鄉; pinyin: Maidiping Xiang) is a rural township in Sangzhi County, Zhangjiajie, Hunan Province, China.

== Administrative divisions ==
The township is divided into 8 villages, which include the following areas: Guangjiashan Village, Maidiping Village, Luyang Village, Huangshanyu Village, Lishanya Village, Qingfengxi Village, Nongkezhan Village, and Shuitianping Village (广家山村、麦地坪村、芦阳村、黄山峪村、栗山亚村、青峰溪村、农科站村、水田坪村).
