= Zhonghu Township =

Zhonghu Township 中湖乡
- Township
- Location in Hunan
- Coordinates: 29°21′43″N 110°22′37″E
- Country: People's Republic of China
- Province: Hunan
- Prefecture-level city: Zhangjiajie
- District: Wulingyuan District
- Time zone: UTC+8 (China Standard)

Zhonghu Township (simplified Chinese: 中湖乡; traditional Chinese: 中湖鄉; pinyin: Zhōnghú Xiāng) is a township under the administration of Wulingyuan District, Zhangjiajie in Hunan province, China. As of 2020, it administers the following residential neighborhoods and villages:

Neighborhoods

- Yangjiajie (杨家界)
- Yejipu (野鸡铺)

Villages

- Shijiayu Village (石家峪村)
- Tanmugang Village (檀木岗村)
- Sanjiayu Village (三家峪村)
- Yuquanyu Village (渔泉峪村)
- Qinglongya Village (青龙垭村)
- Dingjiazhuang Village (定家庄村)
