= Qiaoziwan =

Qiaoziwan Township
- township

Chinese transcription(s)
  - Simplified: 桥自湾乡
  - Traditional: 橋自灣鄉
  - Pinyin: Qiáozìwān Xiāng
- Location in China
- Coordinates: 29°30′26″N 110°08′21″E
- Country: China
- Province: Hunan
- city: Zhangjiajie
- County: Sangzhi County
- Time zone: UTC+8 (China Standard)
- Area code: 0744

Qiaoziwan Township (simplified Chinese: 桥自湾乡; traditional Chinese: 橋自灣鄉; pinyin: Qiáozìwān Xiāng) is a rural township in Sangzhi County, Zhangjiajie, Hunan Province, China.

== Administrative divisions ==
The township is divided into 17 villages, which include the following areas: Yanta Village, Daxikou Village, Baixing Village, Songbai Village, Changping Village, Zhangjiaqiao Village, Ya'erchi Village, Dengjiaping Village, Liujiapu Village, Zhongjiatai Village, Zhujiapo Village, Shanyangxi Village, Wuziwan Village, Panjiashan Village, Baiyang Village, Lijiaya Village, and Wangjia Village (岩塔村、大溪口村、白星村、松柏村、长坪村、张家桥村、鸭儿池村、邓家坪村、刘家铺村、钟家台村、祝家坡村、山羊溪村、五子湾村、潘家山村、白杨村、李家亚村、王家村).
