= Zoumaping =

Zoumaping Township
- township

Chinese transcription(s)
  - Simplified: 走马坪白族乡
  - Traditional: 走馬坪白族鄉
  - Pinyin: Zoumaping Xiang
- Location in China
- Coordinates: 29°28′22″N 110°26′15″E
- Country: China
- Province: Hunan
- city: Zhangjiajie
- County: Sangzhi County

Area
  - Total: 59 km^{2} (23 sq mi)

Population
  - Total: 8,500
  - Density: 140/km^{2} (370/sq mi)
- Time zone: UTC+8 (China Standard)
- Postal code: 427105
- Area code: 0744

Zoumaping Township (simplified Chinese: 走马坪白族乡; traditional Chinese: 走馬坪白族鄉; pinyin: Zoumaping Xiang) is a rural township in Sangzhi County, Zhangjiajie, Hunan Province, China.

== Administrative divisions ==
The township is divided into 11 villages, which include the following areas: Liangchaxi Village, Guizhuya Village, Xiangjiaping Village, Tianhe Village, Longdongping Village, Gunshuiyu Village, Nanmu Village, Tangjiata Village, Zoumaping Village, Zhuojiayu Village, and Zhangjiaya Village (两岔溪村、贵竹垭村、向家坪村、天合村、龙洞坪村、滚水峪村、楠木村、唐家塔村、走马坪村、卓家峪村、张家亚村).
