= Guandiping, Sangzhi =

Guandiping Town
- Town

Chinese transcription(s)
  - Simplified: 官地坪镇
  - Traditional: 官地坪鎮
  - Pinyin: Guāndìpíng Zhèn
- Location in China
- Coordinates: 29°35′36″N 110°25′59″E
- Country: China
- Province: Hunan
- city: Zhangjiajie
- County: Sangzhi County

Area
  - Total: 126.26 km^{2} (48.75 sq mi)

Population
  - Total: 5,000
  - Density: 40/km^{2} (100/sq mi)
- Time zone: UTC+8 (China Standard)
- Postal code: 427102
- Area code: 0744

Guandiping Town (simplified Chinese: 官地坪镇; traditional Chinese: 官地坪鎮; pinyin: Guāndìpíng Zhèn) is an urban town in Sangzhi County, Zhangjiajie, Hunan Province, China.

== Administrative divisions ==
The town is divided into 18 villages and 1 community, which include the following areas: Guandiping Community, Damao Village, Pingtoujie Village, Lianxiang Village, Huping Village, Zhongping Village, Yinshandong Village, Qingfoshan Village, Shuangqiao Village, Huangjiatai Village, Huimaluo Village, Shanyangdong Village, Jinxing Village, Dujiaping Village, Tongkuang Village, Dongliuping Village, Dongkou Village, Baizhuxi Village, and Che'erping Village (官地坪社区、大茂村、坪头界村、联乡村、湖坪村、中坪村、银山栋村、青佛山村、双桥村、黄家台村、会马逻村、山羊栋村、金星村、杜家坪村、铜矿村、东流坪村、洞口村、白竹溪村、车耳坪村).
