= Politics of Zhangjiajie =

The Politics of Zhangjiajie in Hunan province in the People's Republic of China is structured in a dual party-government system like all other governing institutions in mainland China.

The Mayor of Zhangjiajie is the highest-ranking official in the People's Government of Zhangjiajie or Zhangjiajie Municipal Government. However, in the city's dual party-government governing system, the Mayor has less power than the Communist Party of Zhangjiajie Municipal Committee Secretary, colloquially termed the "CPC Party Chief of Zhangjiajie" or "Communist Party Secretary of Zhangjiajie".

== List of mayors of Zhangjiajie ==
| No. | English name | Chinese name | Took office | Left office | Notes |
|---|---|---|---|---|---|
| 1 | Xiao Zhenglong | 肖征龙 | July 1989 | March 1994 | Dayong City |
| 2 | Li Gangting | 李刚铤 | March 1994 | December 1998 | |
| 3 | Lu Pingyi | 鲁平益 | December 1998 | March 1999 | Acting |
| 4 | Lu Pingyi | 鲁平益 | March 1999 | December 2003 | |
| 5 | Hu Bojun | 胡伯俊 | December 2003 | April 2007 | |
| 6 | Zhao Xiaoming | 赵小明 | April 2007 | December 2007 | Acting |
| 7 | Zhao Xiaoming | 赵小明 | December 2007 | March 2013 | |
| 8 | Xu Xianhui | 许显辉 | April 2013 | May 2013 | Acting |
| 9 | Xu Xianhui | 许显辉 | May 2013 | May 2015 | |
| 10 | Wang Zhigang | 王志刚 | June 2015 | September 2017 | |
| 11 | Liu Ge'an | 刘革安 | September 2017 | January 2018 | Acting |
| 12 | Liu Ge'an | 刘革安 | January 2018 | | |

== List of CPC Party secretaries of Zhangjiajie ==
| No. | English name | Chinese name | Took office | Left office | Notes |
|---|---|---|---|---|---|
| 1 | Liu Guoji | 刘国基 | February 1988 | October 1988 | Dayong City |
| 2 | Zhao Jiebing | 赵杰兵 | October 1988 | September 1992 | Dayong City |
| 3 | Xiao Zhenglong | 肖征龙 | September 1992 | May 1994 | Dayong City |
| 4 | Xiao Zhenglong | 肖征龙 | May 1994 | February 1998 | |
| 5 | Liu Liwei | 刘力伟 | February 1998 | April 2007 | |
| 6 | Hu Bojun | 胡伯俊 | April 2007 | March 2013 | |
| 7 | Yang Guangrong | 杨光荣 | March 2013 | December 2016 | |
| 8 | Guo Zhenggui | 虢正贵 | December 2016 | | |
