= Ruitapu, Sangzhi =

Ruitapu Town
- Town

Chinese transcription(s)
  - Simplified: 瑞塔铺镇
  - Traditional: 瑞塔鋪鎮
  - Pinyin: Ruìtǎpū Zhèn
- Location in China
- Coordinates: 29°25′11″N 110°15′31″E
- Country: China
- Province: Hunan
- city: Zhangjiajie
- County: Sangzhi County

Area
  - Total: 108 km^{2} (42 sq mi)

Population
  - Total: 12,000
  - Density: 110/km^{2} (290/sq mi)
- Time zone: UTC+8 (China Standard)
- Postal code: 427101
- Area code: 0744

Ruitapu Town (simplified Chinese: 瑞塔铺镇; traditional Chinese: 瑞塔鋪鎮; pinyin: Ruìtǎpū Zhèn) is an urban town in Sangzhi County, Zhangjiajie, Hunan Province, China.

== Administrative divisions ==
The town is divided into 21 villages and 4 communities, including: Ruishi Community, Shucai Community, Luojiabian Community, Yangjialuo Community, Tangfang Village, Zhengjiaping Village, Qinglongxi Village, Ludouxi Village, Yanxipo Village, Xiaoxigou Village, Niao'erling Village, Huopenyu Village, Dongwangping Village, Wangjiapo Village, Laoyanqiao Village, Chaoshuihe Village, Majing Village, Yangxishan Village, Huangniya Village, Ganxi Village, Chayuanta Village, Dingjiayu Village, Gaofeng Village, Hongshaxi Village, and Xincunping Village (瑞市社区、蔬菜社区、罗家边社区、杨家逻社区、塘坊村、郑家坪村、青龙溪村、芦斗溪村、沿溪坡村、小溪沟村、鸟儿岭村、火盆峪村、东旺坪村、王家坡村、老岩桥村、潮水河村、马井村、杨溪山村、黄泥亚村、干溪村、茶元塔村、定家峪村、高峰村、洪沙溪村、新村坪村).
