= Liyuan, Sangzhi =

Liyuan Town
- Town

Chinese transcription(s)
  - Simplified: 澧源镇
  - Traditional: 澧源鎮
  - Pinyin: Lǐyuán Zhèn
- Location in China
- Coordinates: 29°24′26″N 110°10′34″E
- Country: China
- Province: Hunan
- city: Zhangjiajie
- County: Sangzhi County

Area
  - Total: 98 km^{2} (38 sq mi)

Population
  - Total: 62,000
  - Density: 630/km^{2} (1,600/sq mi)
- Time zone: UTC+8 (China Standard)
- Postal code: 427199
- Area code: 0744

Liyuan Town (simplified Chinese: 澧源镇; traditional Chinese: 澧源鎮; pinyin: Lǐyuán Zhèn) is an urban town and the seat of Sangzhi County in Hunan, China.

== Administrative divisions ==
The town is divided into 17 villages and 14 communities, including the following areas:

- Gaojiaping Community
- Changzhenglu Community
- Wenminglu Community
- Dongzhengjie Community
- Wenchangjie Community
- Hepingjie Community
- Wangjiaping Community
- Zhujiatai Community
- Wuliqiao Community
- Chengguan Community
- Hejiaping Community
- Fangjiaping Community
- Jianxingling Community
- Gaoqiao Community
- Xian'e Village
- Luojiazhuang Village
- Shangjiaping Village
- Xingwangta Village
- Yanggongtan Village
- Huangjinta Village
- Changtan Village
- Zhujiaping Village
- Yanwo Village
- Zhangmuxi Village
- Xiaotianchong Village
- Zhujiachong Village
- Xiaojiayu Village
- Yanya Village
- Jinshan Village
- Caijiayu Village
- Xijie Village
