= Shangdongjie =

Shangdongjie Township
- township

Chinese transcription(s)
  - Simplified: 上洞街乡
  - Traditional: 上洞街鄉
  - Pinyin: Shǎngdòngjiē Xiāng
- Location in China
- Coordinates: 29°19′44″N 109°59′21″E
- Country: China
- Province: Hunan
- city: Zhangjiajie
- County: Sangzhi County
- Time zone: UTC+8 (China Standard)
- Postal code: 427111
- Area code: 0744

Shangdongjie Township (simplified Chinese: 上洞街乡; traditional Chinese: 上洞街鄉; pinyin: Shǎngdòngjiē Xiāng) is a rural township in Sangzhi County, Zhangjiajie, Hunan Province, China.

== Administrative divisions ==
The township is divided into 11 villages, which include the following areas: Shangdongjie Village, Libixi Village, Maitaxi Village, Maluo Village, Yuanzi Village, Erhuping Village, Changtangang Village, Dadiping Village, Erhuxi Village, Woyunjie Village, and Fangchangdong Village (上洞街村、利比溪村、麦塔溪村、麻逻村、院子村、二户坪村、长潭岗村、大地坪村、二户溪村、卧云界村、方厂洞村).
