= Jundiping =

Subdistrict in Zhangjiajie, Hunan, China

Coordinates: 29°20′35″N 110°31′55″E

Jundiping Subdistrict (Chinese: 军地坪街道; pinyin: Jūndìpíng Jiēdào) is a subdistrict and the seat of Wulingyuan District in Zhangjiajie Prefecture-level City, Hunan, China. The subdistrict was reformed through the amalgamation of Suoxiyu Township (Chinese: 索溪峪土家族乡), Tianzishan Town (Chinese: 天子山镇) and the former Jundiping Subdistrict on November 27, 2015. It has an area of 225.75 km^{2} (87.16 sq mi) with a population of 29,100 (as of 2015). Its seat is Huajuanlu Community (Chinese: 画卷路社区).
