= Yongding, Zhangjiajie =

Yongding 永定区
- District
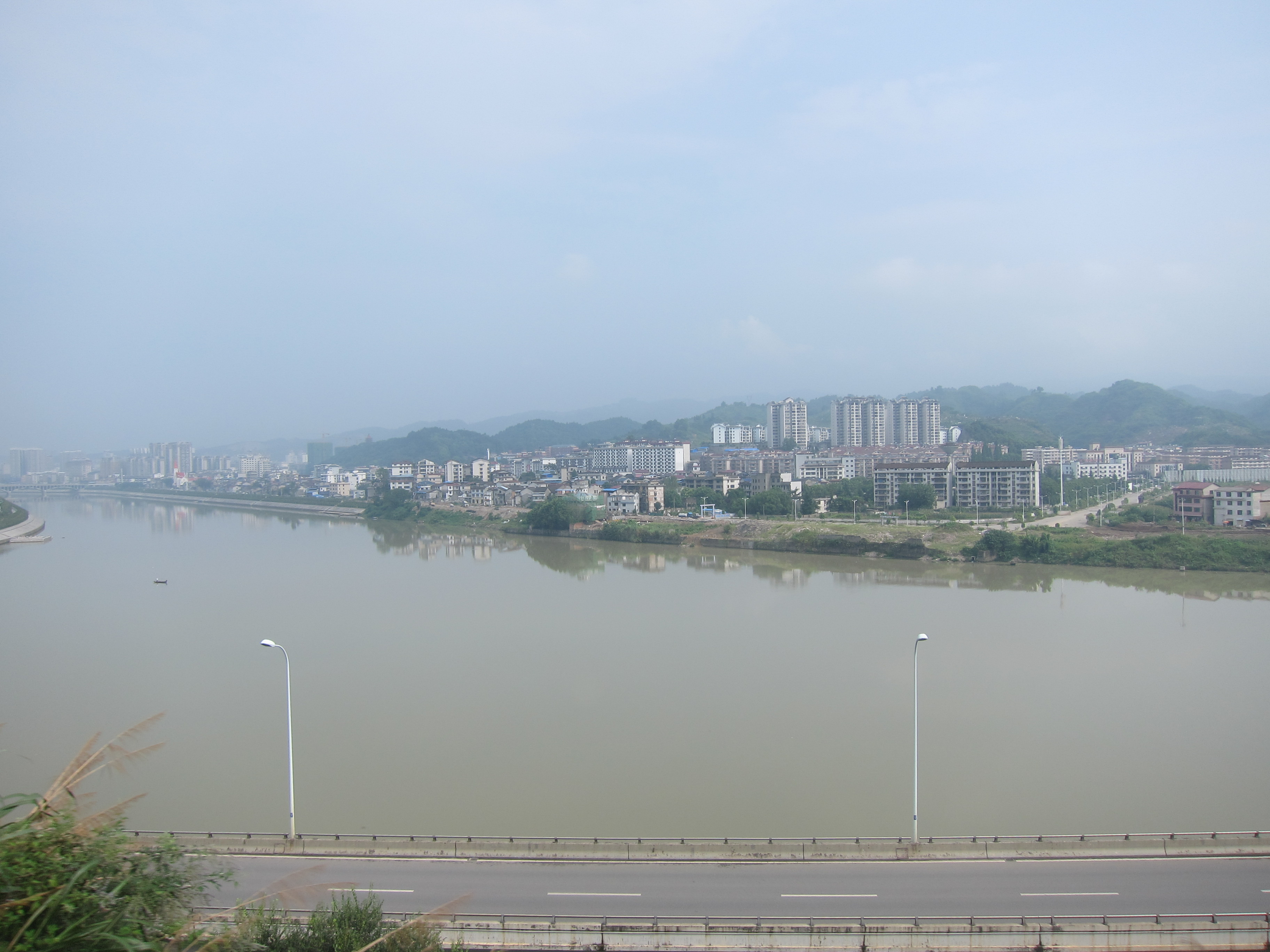

- Location of Yongding District within Zhangjiajie.

- Location in Hunan
- Coordinates: 29°07′32″N 110°29′33″E
- Country: People's Republic of China
- Province: Hunan
- Prefecture-level city: Zhangjiajie

Area
  - Total: 2,169.03 km^{2} (837.47 sq mi)

Population
  - Total: 517,600
  - Density: 238.6/km^{2} (618.1/sq mi)
- Time zone: UTC+8 (China Standard)

Yongding District (simplified Chinese: 永定区; traditional Chinese: 永定區; pinyin: Yǒngdìng Qū) is one of two urban districts in Zhangjiajie City, Hunan Province, China. Located on the south of Zhangjiajie, the district is bordered to the north by Wulingyuan District and Sangzhi County, to the northeast by Cili County, to the east by Taoyuan County, to the southeast by Yuanling County, and to the southwest by Yongshun County. Yongding District has an area of 2,208 square kilometres (853 sq mi) with a registered population of 468,300 (as of 2015). It is divided into six subdistricts, seven towns and seven subdistricts (November 27, 2015), and its government seat is Xixiping (西溪坪街道).

== Administrative divisions ==
According to the result on adjustment of township-level administrative divisions of Yongding District on November 27, 2015, it has six subdistricts, seven towns and seven townships under its jurisdiction. They are:

7 Townships

- Hezuoqiao
- Luoshui
- Luotaping
- Qiaotou
- Sanjiaguan
- Siduping
- Xiejiaya

7 Towns

- Jiaoziya
- Maoyanhe
- Tianmenshan
- Wangjiaping
- Xinqiao
- Yinjiaxi
- Yuanguping

6 Subdistricts

- Chongwen
- Dayongqiao
- Guanliping
- Nanzhuangping
- Xixiping
- Yongding
