= Yujiazui =

Town in the Hunan Province of People's Republic of China

Yujiazui is a small town in the north west Hunan province of China.
