= Wulingyuan, Zhangjiajie =

Wulingyuan 武陵源区
- District
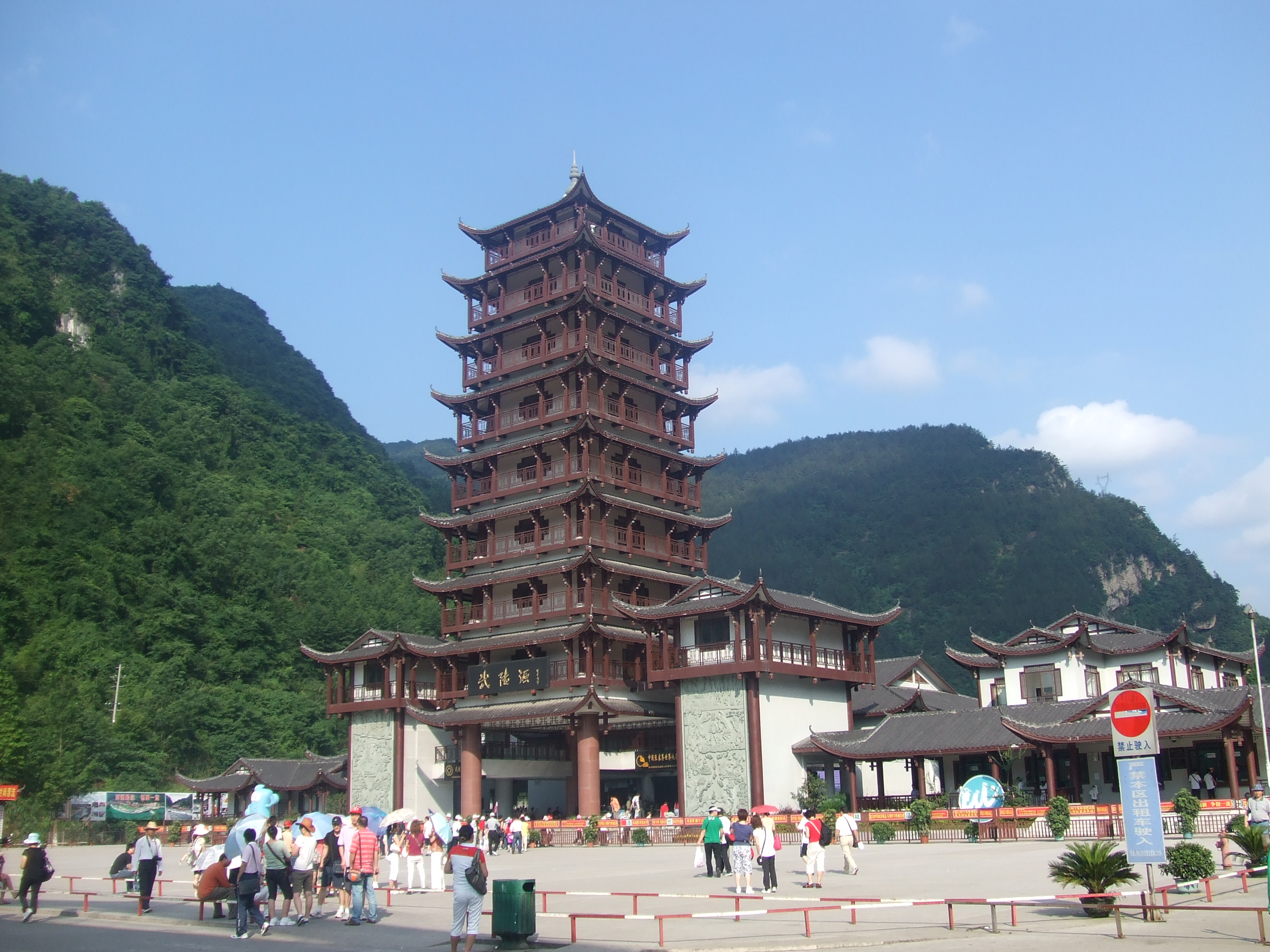

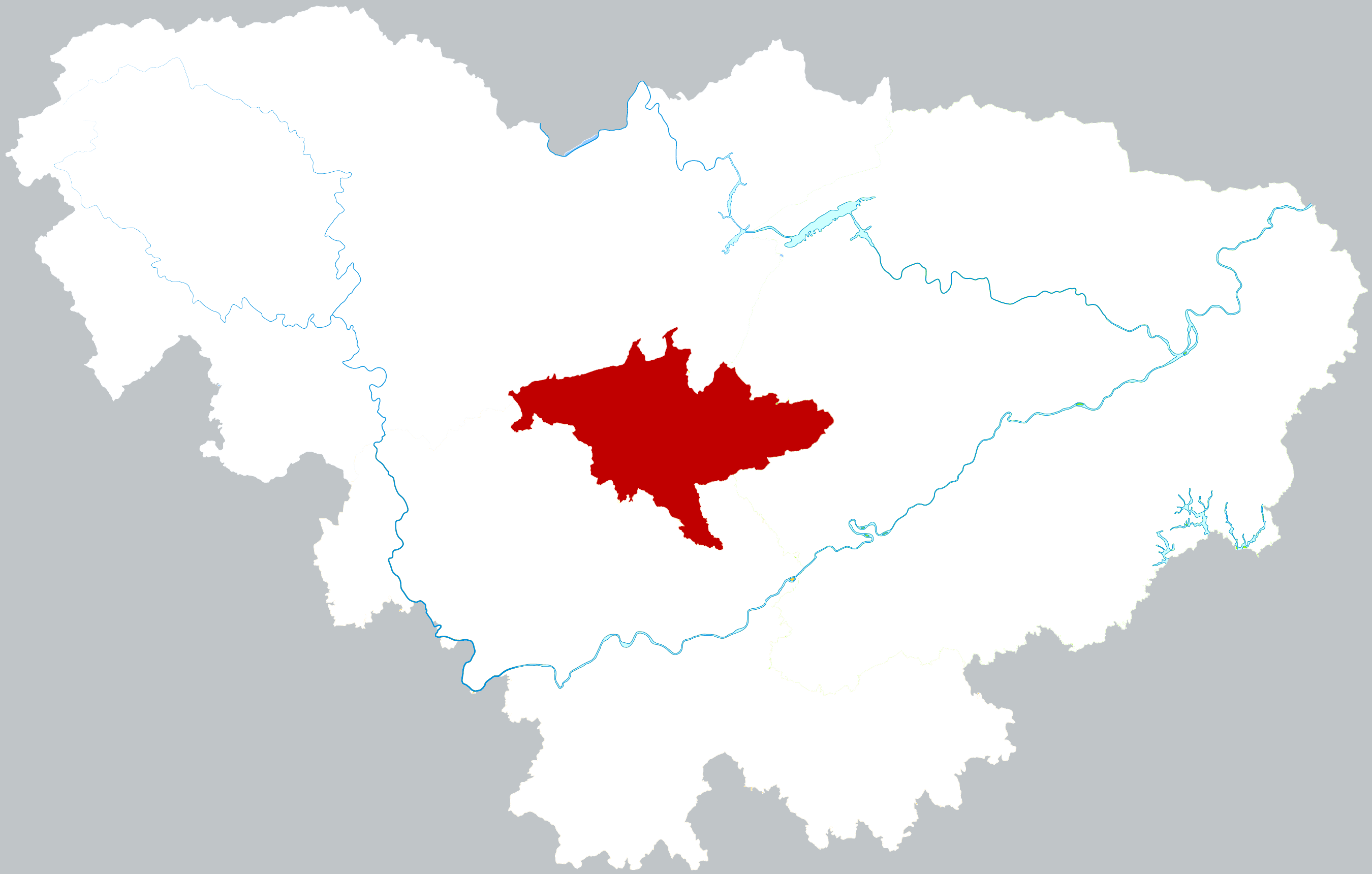
- Location of Wulingyuan District within Zhangjiajie.

- Location in Hunan
- Coordinates: 29°20′02″N 110°30′06″E
- Country: China
- Province: Hunan
- Prefecture-level city: Zhangjiajie
- District seat: Jundiping Subdistrict

Area
  - Total: 397.53 km^{2} (153.49 sq mi)

Population (2020 census)
  - Total: 60,857
  - Density: 153.09/km^{2} (396.50/sq mi)
- Time zone: UTC+8 (China Standard)
- Postal code: 427400
- Website: wly.zjj.gov.cn

Wulingyuan District (simplified Chinese: 武陵源区; traditional Chinese: 武陵源區; pinyin: Wǔlíngyuán Qū) is one of two urban districts in Zhangjiajie City, Hunan Province, China. It is also the smallest district by population in Hunan. Located on the central area of Zhangjiajie, the district is surrounded by Cili County to the northeast and southeast, to the north by Sangzhi County, and to the south and southwest by Yongding District. The district is named after Wulingyuan of the UNESCO World Heritage Site, one of famous scenic zones.

Wulingyuan District has an area of 397.53 square kilometres (153.49 sq mi) with a registered population of 52,712 (as of 2010 Census), 87% of which are ethnic Tujia. It is divided into 2 subdistricts and 2 towns (November 27, 2015), and its government seat is Jundiping Subdistrict (军地坪街道).

== Administrative divisions ==
After an adjustment of township-level administrative divisions of Wulingyuan District on 27 November 2015, Wulingyuan District has 2 subdistricts and 2 townships under its jurisdiction. Its government seat is Jundiping (军地坪). They are:

2 Subdistricts

- Luoguta Subdistrict (锣鼓塔街道)
- Jundiping Subdistrict (军地坪街道)

2 Townships

- Xiehe Township (协合乡)
- Zhonghu Township (中湖乡)
