= Zhangjiajie =

City in Hunan, China

Zhangjiajie 张家界市 Zanxjiaxgaif Tayung
- Prefecture-level city
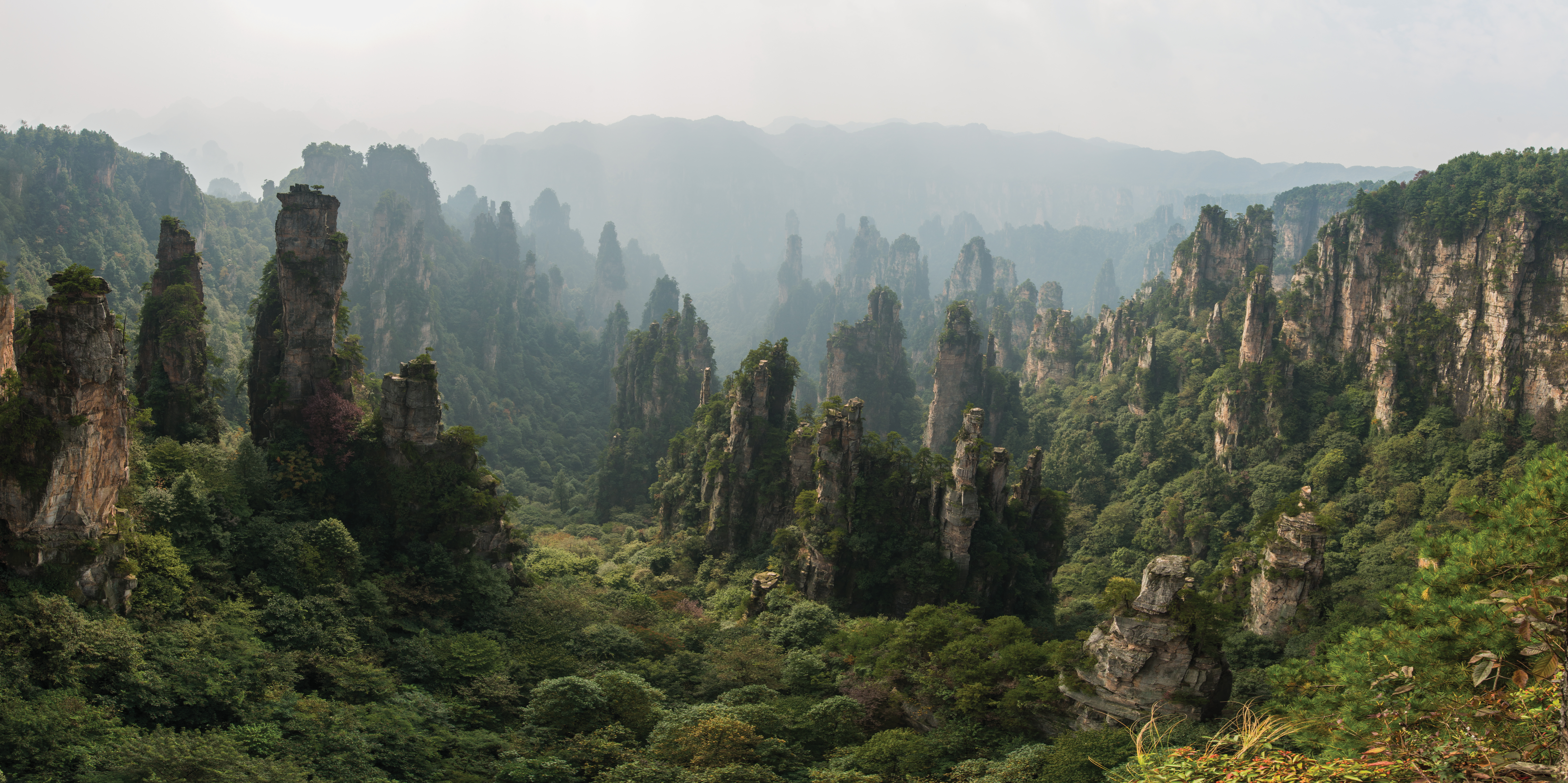
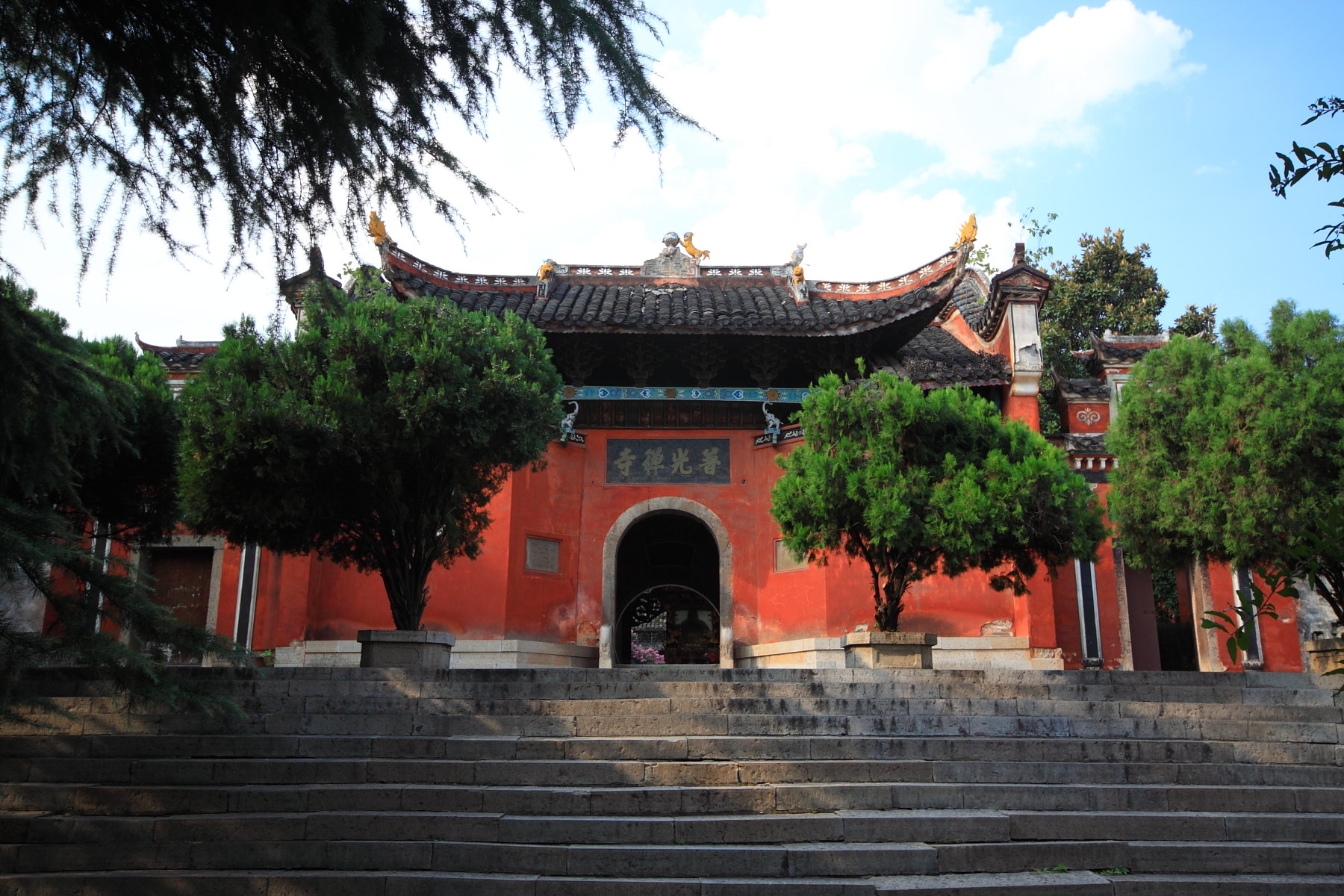
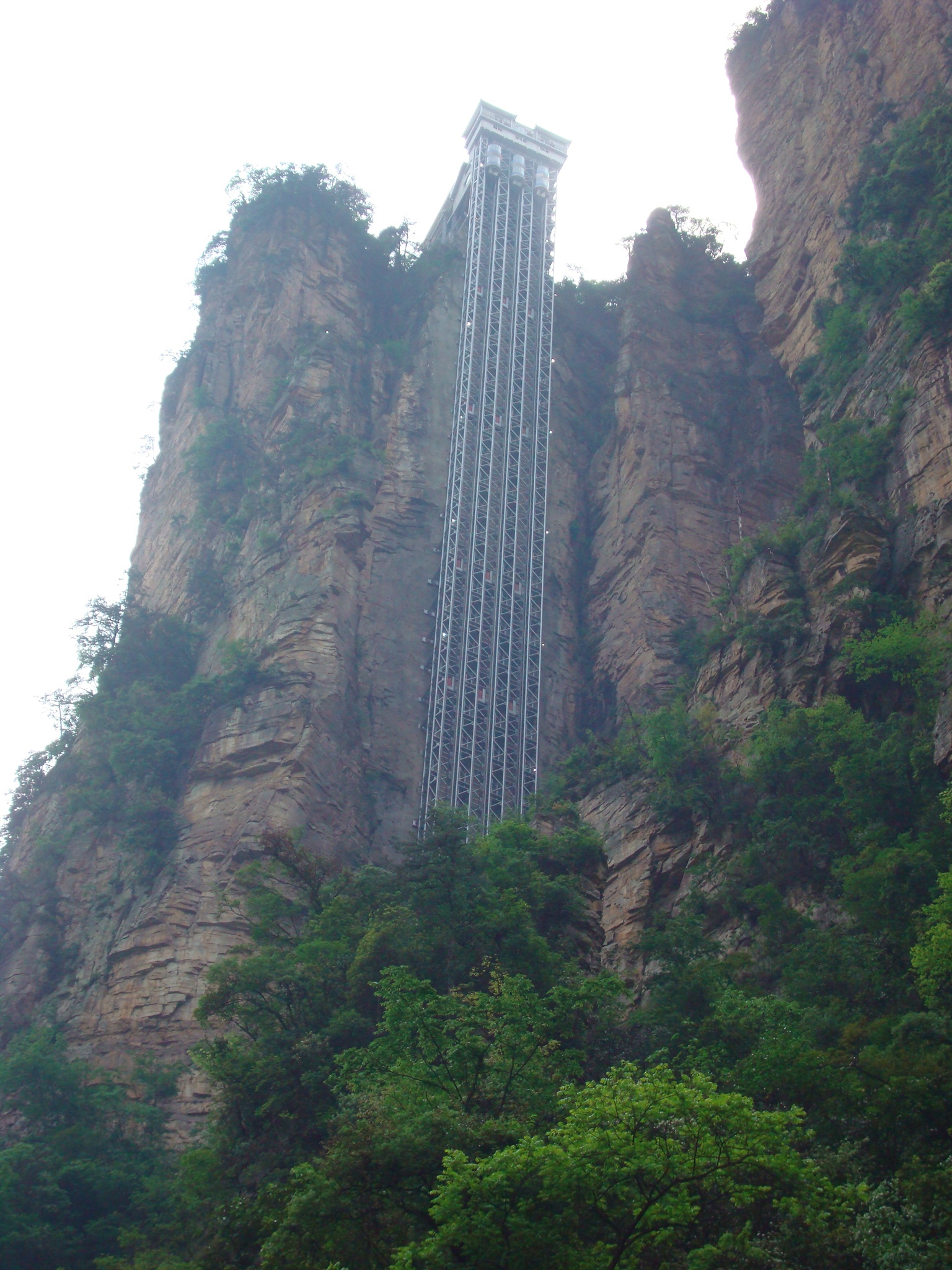
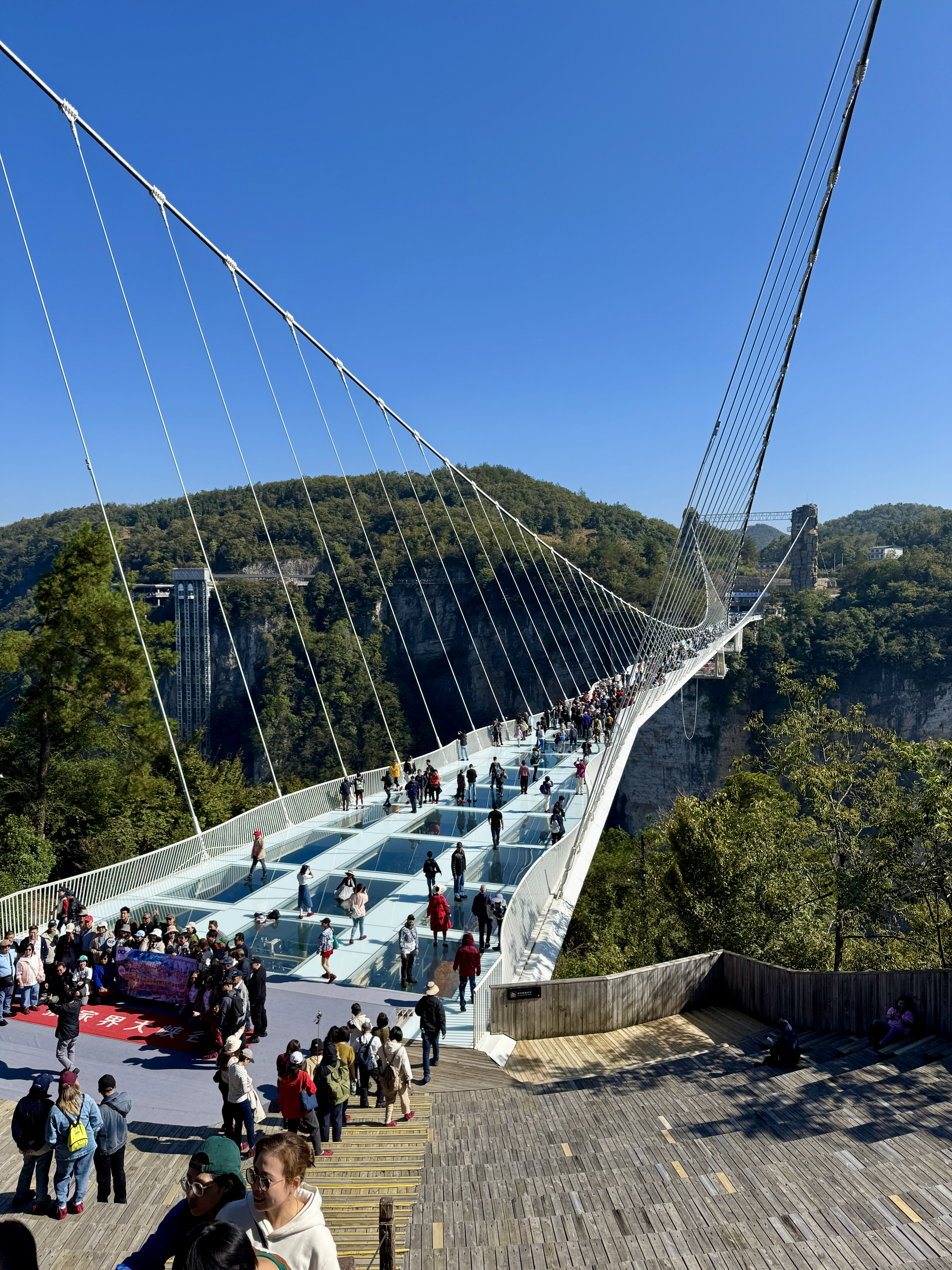
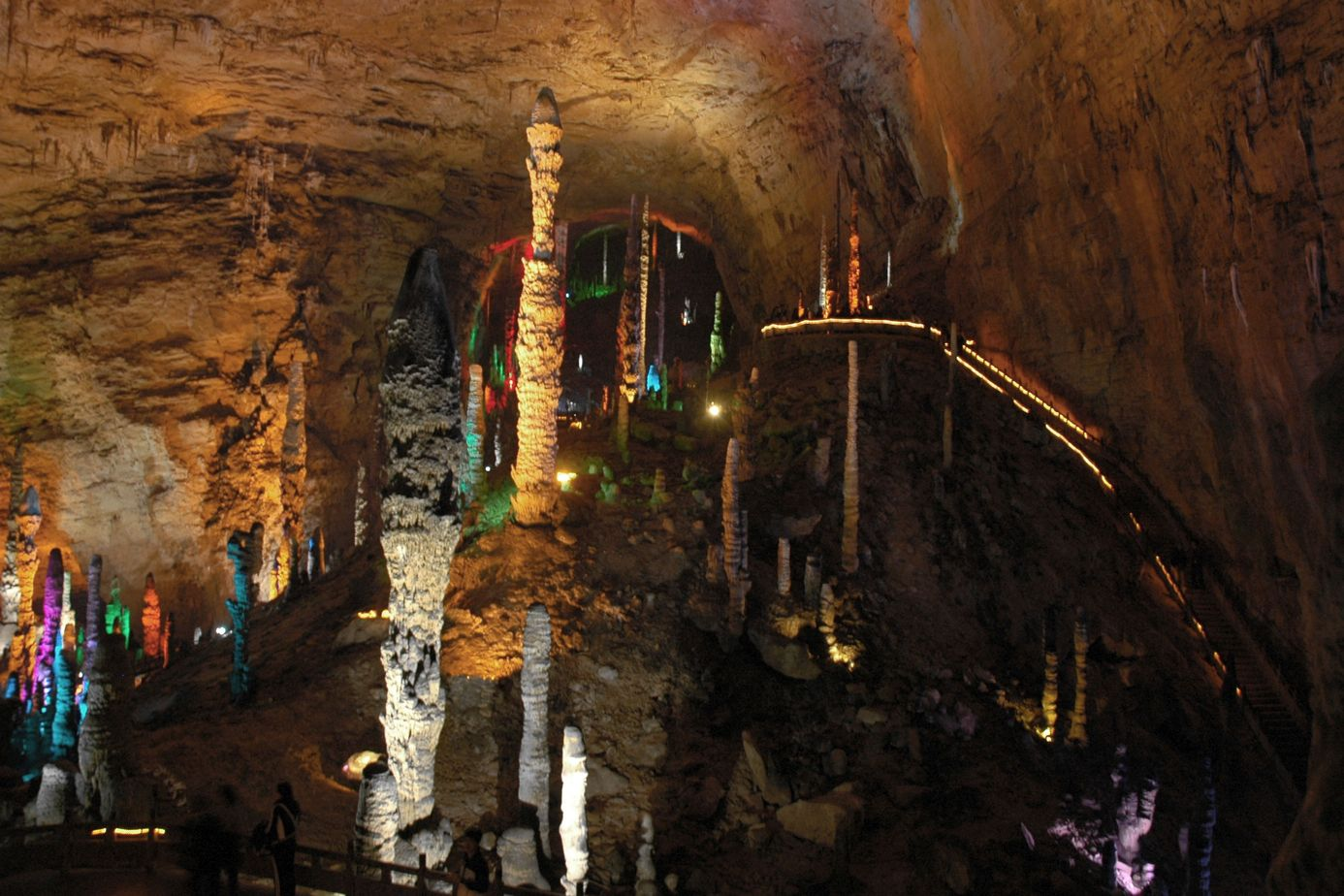
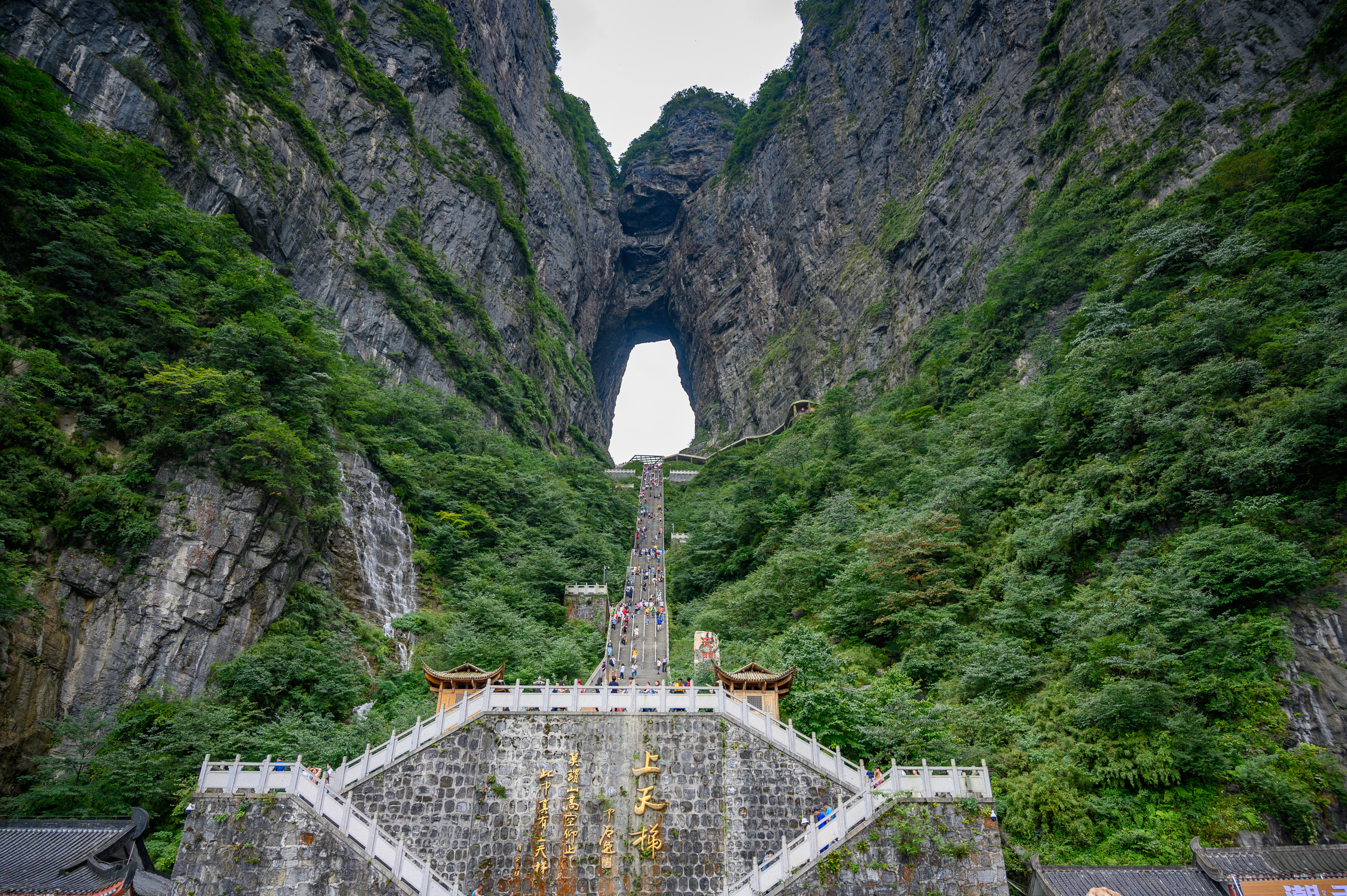
- Wulingyuan Puguang Temple Bailong Elevator Zhangjiajie Glass Bridge Huanglong Cave Tianmen Mountain
- Nickname: Dayong
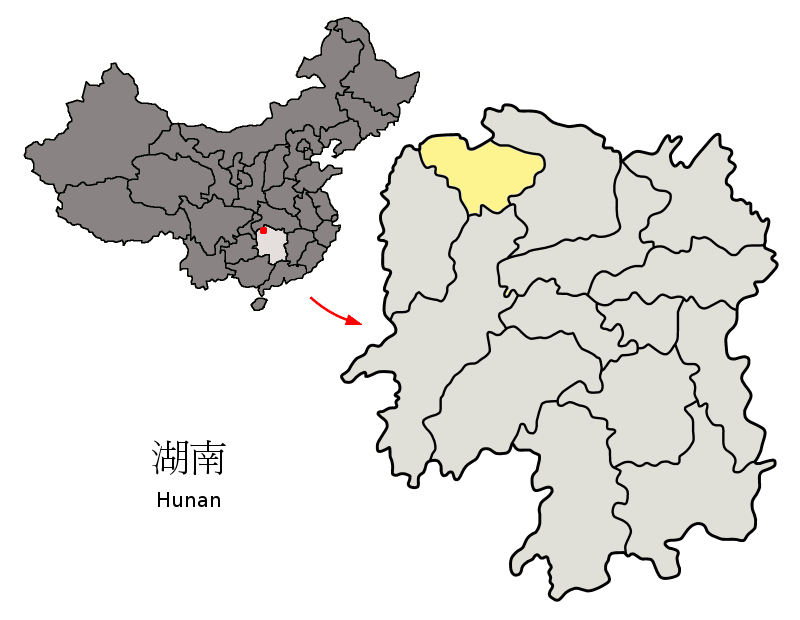
- Location of Zhangjiajie City jurisdiction in Hunan

- Location of Zhangjiajie City centre in Hunan Location of Zhangjiajie City centre in China
- Coordinates (Zhangjiajie municipal government): 29°07′01″N 110°28′44″E
- Country: People's Republic of China
- Province: Hunan
- Municipal seat: Yongding District

Area
  - Prefecture-level city: 9,518 km^{2} (3,675 sq mi)
  - Urban (2017): 55.20 km^{2} (21.31 sq mi)
  - Districts: 2,571.3 km^{2} (992.8 sq mi)

Population (2010)
  - Prefecture-level city: 1,476,521
  - Density: 155.1/km^{2} (401.8/sq mi)
  - Urban (2017): 225,700
  - Districts: 584,000

GDP
  - Prefecture-level city: CN¥ 44.8 billion US$ 7.2 billion
  - Per capita: CN¥ 29,425; US$ 4,724
- Time zone: UTC+8 (China Standard)
- ISO 3166 code: CN-HN-08
- Website: www.zjj.gov.cn

Zhangjiajie
- "Zhangjiajie" in Simplified (top) and Traditional (bottom) Chinese characters
- Simplified Chinese: 张家界
- Traditional Chinese: 張家界
- Postal: Changkiakai; Tayung (until 1994)
Transcriptions
Standard Mandarin
- Hanyu Pinyin: Zhāngjiājiè
- Wade–Giles: Chang^{1}-chia^{1}-chieh^{4}
- IPA: [ʈʂáŋ.tɕjá.tɕjê]

Dayong
- Chinese: 大庸
- Postal: Tayung
Transcriptions
Standard Mandarin
- Hanyu Pinyin: Dàyōng
- Wade–Giles: Ta^{4}-yung^{1}

Zhangjiajie (simplified Chinese: 张家界; traditional Chinese: 張家界; pinyin: Zhāngjiājiè; Tujia: Zanxjiaxgaif /tsán tɕá kǎi/) is a prefecture-level city in the northwestern part of Hunan Province, China. It comprises the district of Yongding, Wulingyuan and counties of Cili and Sangzhi. It contains the Zhangjiajie National Forest Park, part of the Wulingyuan Scenic Area which was designated as a UNESCO World Heritage Site in 1992.

== History ==
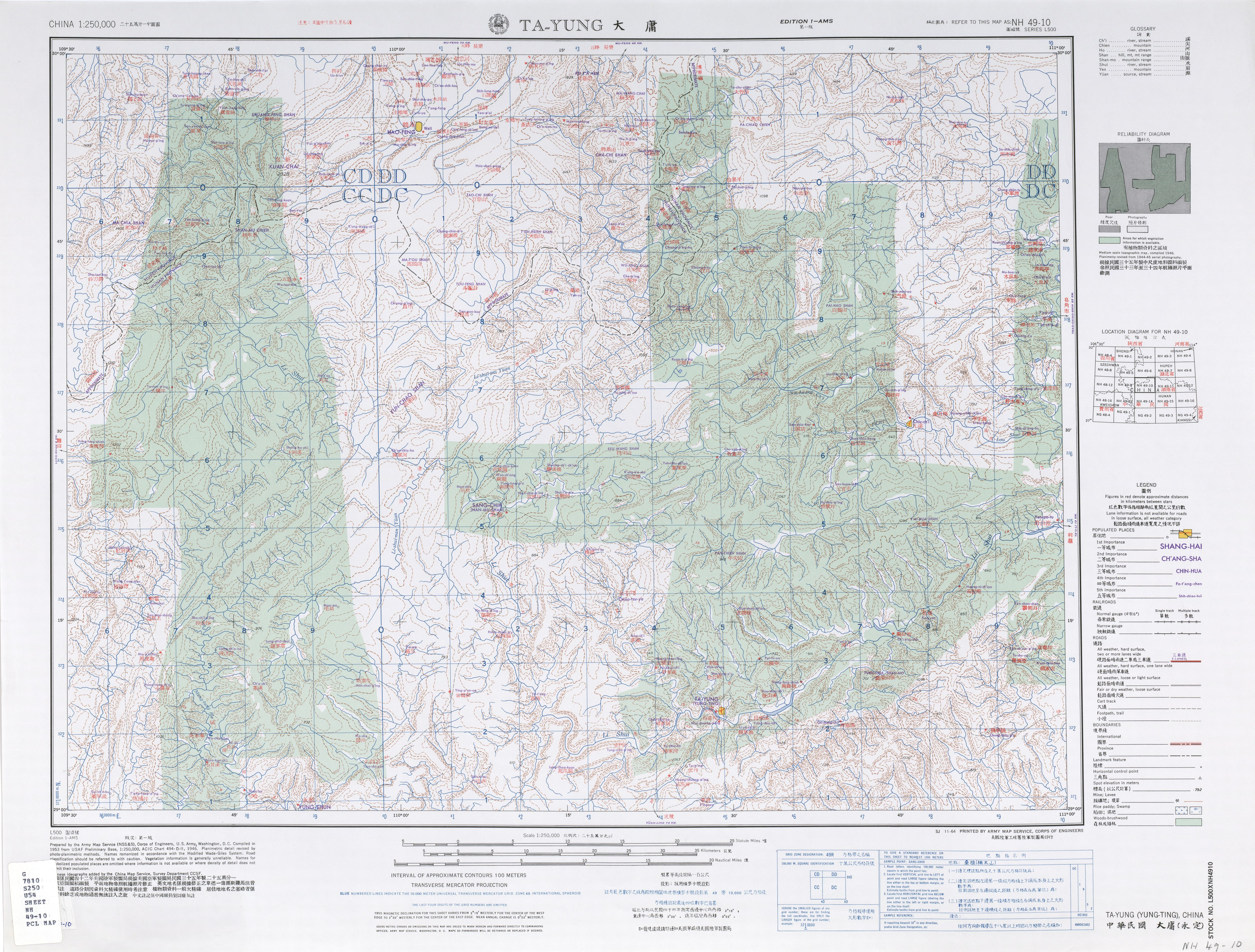
Map including Zhangjiajie (labeled as TA-YUNG (YUNG-TING) 大庸) (AMS, 1953)

The city itself was previously named Dayong (大庸) and has a recorded history dating back to 221 BC. People lived here along both banks of the Lishui River (the mother river in Zhangjiajie), now within the boundaries of Zhangjiajie City, very early during the Stone Age. Human settlement in this region dates back 100,000 years, rivaling famous sites such as Xi'an, Beijing and others. In 1986, the Academy of Chinese Social Science discovered Stone Age relics in Cili County, unearthing 108 articles of stoneware; mostly tapered-form, hacked-tamped and plate-shaped works. Shortly thereafter, in 1988, the Archaeological Institute of the Hunan Province found other relics in Sangzhi County, including three pieces of stoneware that were estimated to have been fashioned over around the same time period.

Ten thousand years ago, those who lived within the boundaries of what is now Zhangjiajie City employed fire to bake pottery. Archaeologists have found more than 20 relics of this kind in the Cili County. While in Sangzhi County, a black clay pot adorned with a unique design was unearthed dating back ten thousand years. During that period, this pottery-firing technique was the most advanced in China. These technological advancements in the fashioning of stone tools and pottery would seem to indicate a highly developed culture in this region. However, the society which developed only endured briefly before waning and being superseded by other regional powers. This seems understandable in view of Zhangjiajie's remote geographical position, its undeveloped land and river transportation and its mountainous terrain making cultivation difficult. For these reasons, Zhangjiajie has been labeled "the Land of the Savage Southern Minority" since the earliest recorded history. Additional name descriptors have been the "Wuling Rude People" and "Tujia Rude People", indicative of discriminatory views held against the regional culture.

== Origin of the name ==
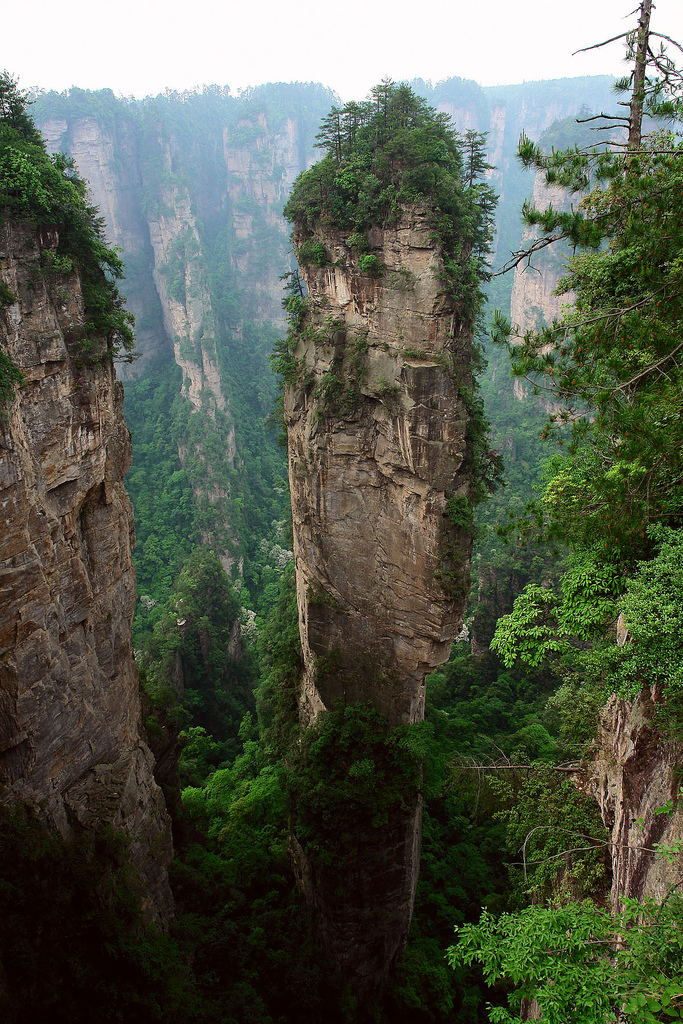
Wulingyuan

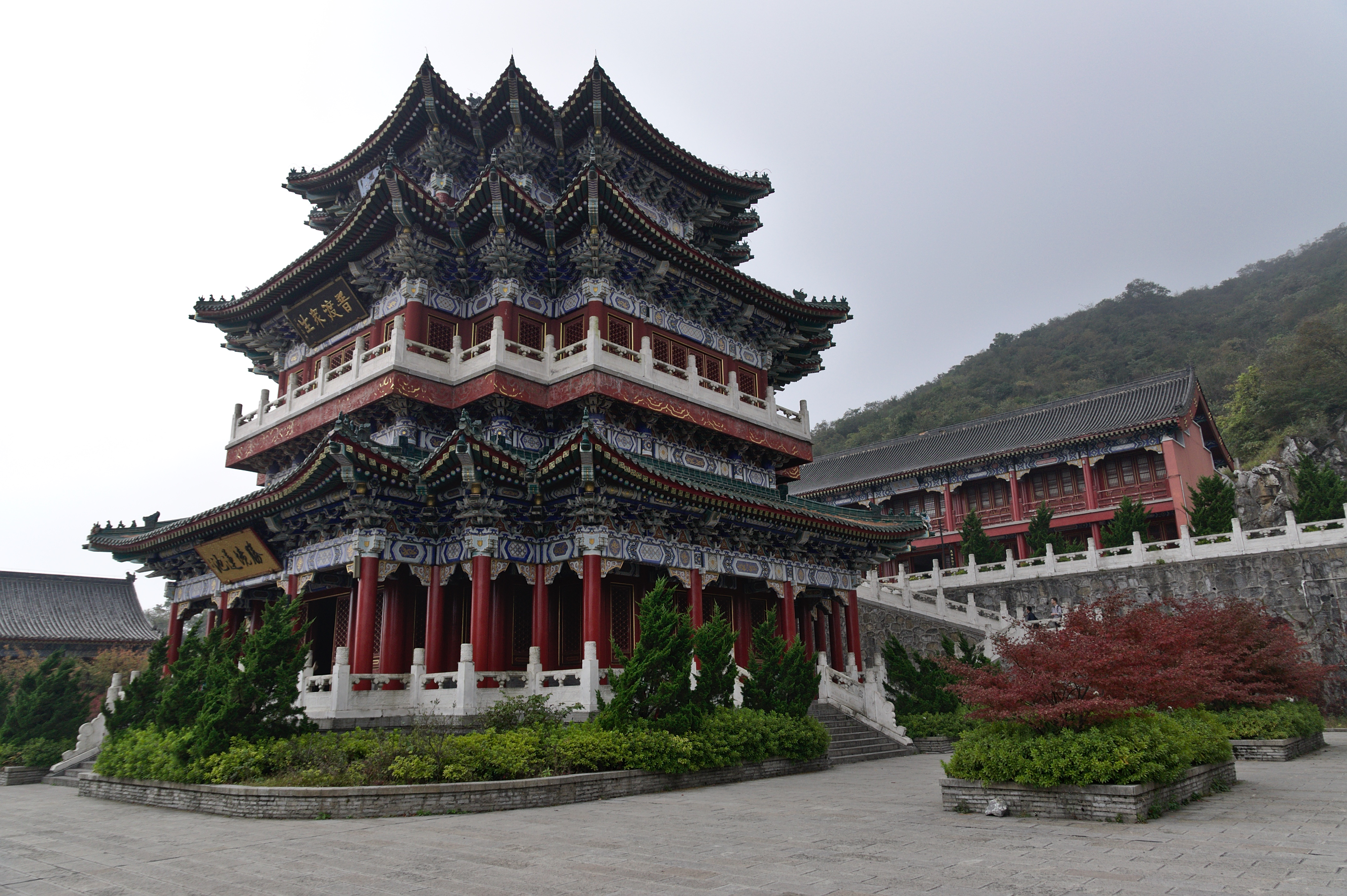
The Tianmenshan Temple at Tianmen Mountain

The new name of Zhangjiajie City was adopted in 1994, after the National Forest Park in the Wulingyuan Scenic Area in order to give it more prominence and after this site had been designated a UNESCO World Heritage Site in 1992. The National Forest Park had been given the name of Zhangjiajie after the name of a small village located within its bounds and now a popular tourist attraction within the park. The three-character name (张家界) can be interpreted as follows: "Zhang" (张) is a common surname in China; "jia" (家) can be translated as "family" and "jie" (界) can be translated as "homeland", giving the completed translation of "Zhang family homeland." It has been reported that at least one tourist guide has said that the name may have been chosen to convey the idea or impression of "Open the family door to welcome the world" (张开家门引进世界), but this is not the locally accepted and directly translated meaning of the name. The official version of its name is linked to a Han general and advisor, Zhang Liang, who resettled in the area after a suspicious Liu Bang, the founder of Han dynasty, started to persecute his staffs and generals who had contributed to his becoming emperor. It was so named to signify that the Zhang family had set up home there.

"jie" in the city has two meanings: one refers to the boundary of ownership, the other refers to high mountains. The Daoguang edition of the Qing Dynasty "Annals of Yongding County" contained: "Wudong Stream originated in Zhangjiajie." Republic of China edition of "Cili County records" contained: "Suoxi from Zhangjiajie." Here Zhangjiajie, refers to the Zhangjiajie National Forest Park area. Zhangjiajie's name, the earliest in the Ming Chongzhen four years (1631) "Zhang Genealogy" preface. The preface was written by Zhang Zaichang, the sixth grandson of Zhang Wancong, commander of Yongding Wei Dayong Office. During the reign of Hongzhi of the Ming Dynasty (1488–1506), the imperial court, seeing Zhang Wancong's meritorious service in guarding the town, awarded him the "mountain land" around the Zhangjiajie National Forest Park as a fief. He then moved his family up the mountain to maintain the business. Ming Chongzhen three years (1630), the sixth generation of Zhang Wancong's grandson Zhang Zaihong was given a regiment officer, and set up a government office here. This area became the hereditary territory of the Zhang family, called "Zhangjiajie".

== Administrative subdivisions ==
Zhangjiajie administers two districts and two counties.

- Yongding District (永定区) (which contains the central, built-up area of Zhangjiajie city)
- Wulingyuan District (武陵源区)
- Cili County (慈利县)
- Sangzhi County (桑植县)

Map
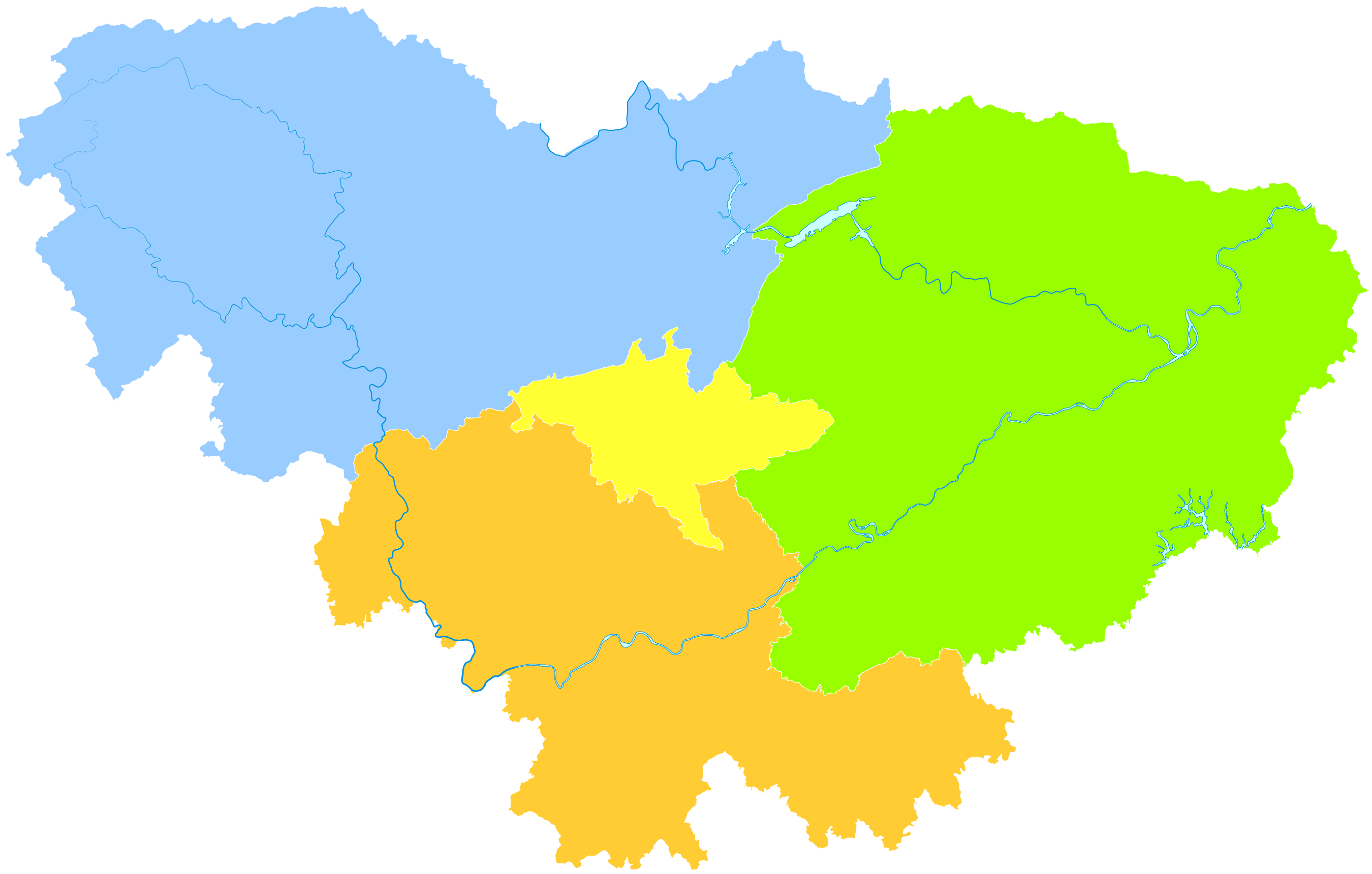

== Climate ==
Climate data for Zhangjiajie, elevation 219 m (719 ft), (1991–2020 normals, extremes 1951–present)
Month	Jan	Feb	Mar	Apr	May	Jun	Jul	Aug	Sep	Oct	Nov	Dec	Year
Record high °C (°F)	22.8 (73.0)	29.4 (84.9)	35.1 (95.2)	38.2 (100.8)	38.4 (101.1)	38.9 (102.0)	41.7 (107.1)	42.3 (108.1)	40.8 (105.4)	37.7 (99.9)	31.0 (87.8)	25.4 (77.7)	42.3 (108.1)
Mean daily maximum °C (°F)	9.5 (49.1)	12.2 (54.0)	17.0 (62.6)	23.4 (74.1)	27.4 (81.3)	30.5 (86.9)	33.5 (92.3)	33.6 (92.5)	29.4 (84.9)	23.3 (73.9)	17.9 (64.2)	12.2 (54.0)	22.5 (72.5)
Daily mean °C (°F)	5.6 (42.1)	7.9 (46.2)	12.0 (53.6)	17.7 (63.9)	22.0 (71.6)	25.5 (77.9)	28.2 (82.8)	28.0 (82.4)	24.0 (75.2)	18.4 (65.1)	13.0 (55.4)	7.9 (46.2)	17.5 (63.5)
Mean daily minimum °C (°F)	2.9 (37.2)	4.9 (40.8)	8.5 (47.3)	13.8 (56.8)	18.2 (64.8)	21.9 (71.4)	24.4 (75.9)	24.2 (75.6)	20.4 (68.7)	15.1 (59.2)	9.7 (49.5)	4.9 (40.8)	14.1 (57.3)
Record low °C (°F)	−13.7 (7.3)	−6.2 (20.8)	−1.3 (29.7)	0.4 (32.7)	8.6 (47.5)	11.9 (53.4)	18.3 (64.9)	15.8 (60.4)	12.5 (54.5)	4.0 (39.2)	−1.7 (28.9)	−5.1 (22.8)	−13.7 (7.3)
Average precipitation mm (inches)	46.2 (1.82)	58.3 (2.30)	88.4 (3.48)	125.5 (4.94)	192.7 (7.59)	219.8 (8.65)	226.9 (8.93)	114.9 (4.52)	100.6 (3.96)	94.5 (3.72)	64.2 (2.53)	26.9 (1.06)	1,358.9 (53.5)
Average precipitation days (≥ 0.1 mm)	11.1	11.2	13.9	14.4	16.3	15.2	13.8	11.0	9.1	12.6	10.4	8.6	147.6
Average snowy days	5.0	2.6	0.8	0	0	0	0	0	0	0	0.1	1.7	10.2
Average relative humidity (%)	74	73	74	74	76	78	76	73	72	75	76	72	74
Mean monthly sunshine hours	57.7	57.9	84.0	110.2	123.0	124.9	180.4	189.4	132.6	104.2	91.1	74.6	1,330
Percentage possible sunshine	18	18	22	28	29	30	42	47	36	30	29	23	29
Source: China Meteorological Administration

== Government ==
The current CPC Party Secretary (chief) of Zhangjiajie is Guo Zhenggui and the current mayor is Liu Ge'an.

== Transportation ==
The Zhangjiajie Hehua International Airport services scheduled service to major airports in China. It is about 5 km (3.1 mi) away from the downtown and 30 km (19 mi) away from Wulingyuan Scenic Area.

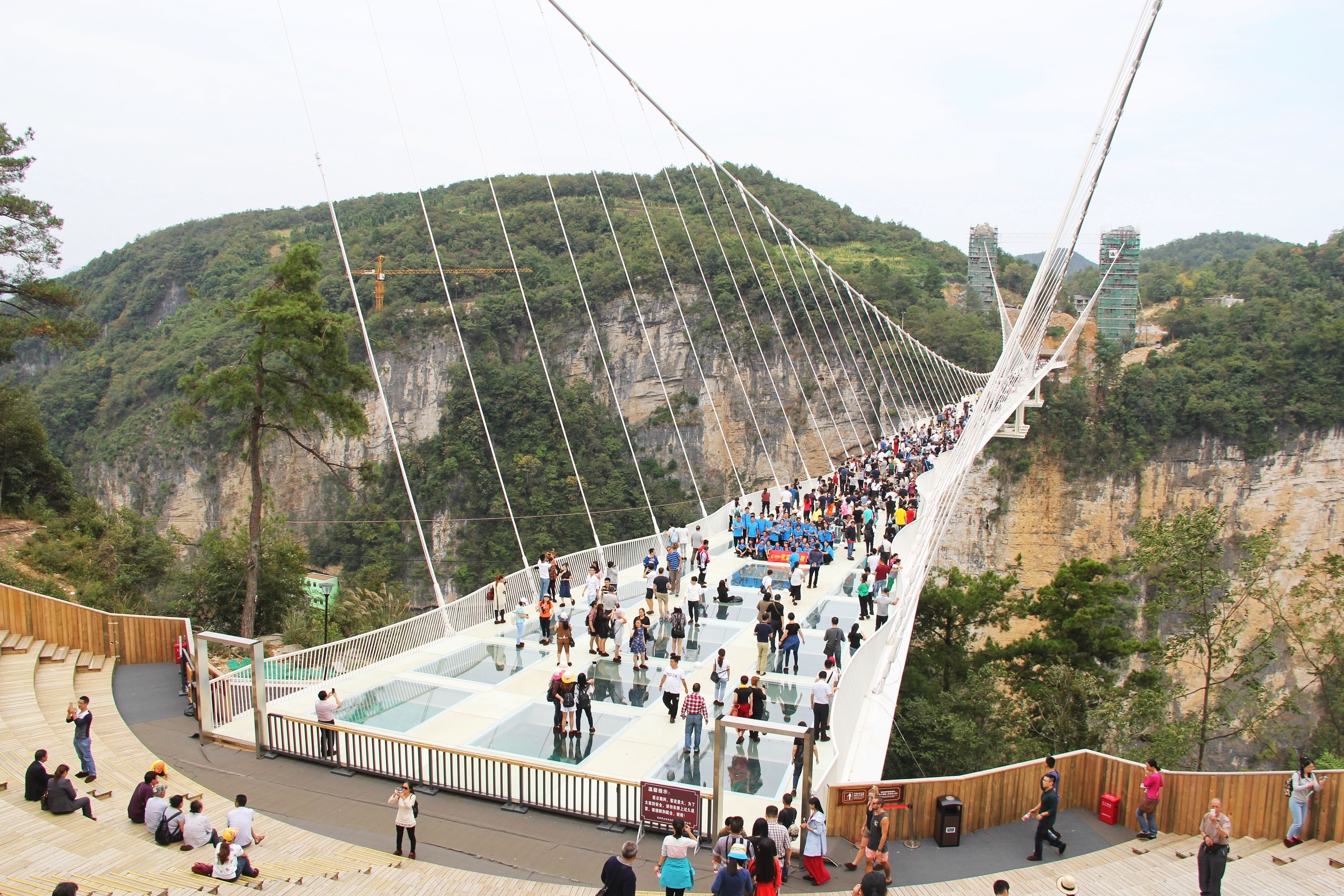
The Zhangjiajie Glass Bridge in Zhangjiajie National Forest Park.

=== Rail ===
Zhangjaijie is served by two railway stations. Zhangjiajie railway station is on the Jiaozuo–Liuzhou railway. Zhangjiajie West railway station opened in 2019 on the Qianjiang–Changde railway.

=== Roads ===
Due to tourism, the G5513 Changsha–Zhangjiajie Expressway links provincial capital Changsha and Zhangjiajie.

== Twin towns — Sister cities ==
Zhangjiajie is twinned with:

- Hadong County, South Gyeongsang, South Korea (2006)
- Santa Fe, New Mexico, United States (2009)
- Naruto, Tokushima, Japan (2011)
- Arouca, Metropolitan Area of Porto, Portugal (2017)
