= Lantian, Lianyuan =

Lantian Subdistrict 蓝田街道
- Subdistrict
- Location in Hunan
- Coordinates: 27°41′37″N 111°40′06″E
- Country: People's Republic of China
- Province: Hunan
- Prefecture-level city: Loudi
- County-level city: Lianyuan

Area
  - Total: 43 km^{2} (17 sq mi)

Population
  - Total: 45,000
  - Density: 1,000/km^{2} (2,700/sq mi)
- Time zone: UTC+8 (China Standard)
- Area code: 0738

Lantian (simplified Chinese: 蓝田街道; traditional Chinese: 藍田街道; pinyin: Lántián Jiēdào) is a subdistrict and the seat of Lianyuan City in Hunan, China. The subdistrict is located in the southwest central part of the city, it is bordered by Anping and Longtang towns to the north, Shimashan Town to the east, Sanjia Township to the south, Liumutang Town to the west. It has an area of 24.5 km^{2} (9.5 sq mi) with a population of 81,683 (2010 census). After the Amalgamation of Village-level Divisions in 2016, the subdistrict has 6 villages and 9 communities under its jurisdiction.

== History ==
Lantian was reorganized as a subdistrict from Lantian Town (Chinese: 蓝田镇) in 1987. It is an ancient town with a history of more than 600 years. It is also the place, where the famous Chinese satiric novel Fortress Besieged was written by Qian Zhongshu served as a teacher of National Teacher' College (the current Hunan Normal University) in Lantan in 1940s.

== Administrative divisions ==
The subdistrict is divided into 9 villages and 9 communities: Minguang Community, Guangmingjie Community, Guangmingshan Community, Wenyilu Community, Jiaotonglu Community, Luojiatian Community, Shuangjiangjie Community, Guangwen Community, Xinxin Community, Hujia Village, Jianzhong Village, Xiaxi Village, Lianxing Village, Jizhong Village, Qingling Village, Hongxing Village, Risheng Village, and Xichongwan Village (民光社区、光明街社区、光明山社区、文艺路社区、交通路社区、罗家佃社区、双江街社区、光文社区、新新社区、胡家村、建中村、峡溪村、联兴村、集中村、青岭村、洪兴村、日升村、西冲湾村).
