= Wujia =

Wujia may refer to:

- Wujia Community (吴家社区), Huazhou Subdistrict
- Wujia River, a river in the Inner Mongolia of China
- Wujia Town (五甲镇), Tongzhou, Nantong
- Wujia Town (五家镇), Yuanbaoshan District
- Wujia Town (乌家镇), Hepu County, Beihai, Guangxi, China
- Wujia Town (吴家镇), Fucheng, Mianyang
- Wujia Town (吴家镇), Panshan County
- Wujia Town (吴家镇), Rongchang, Chongqing
- Wujia Township (五家乡), Dongxiang Autonomous County
- Wujia Township (伍家乡), Wujiagang, Yichang
- Wujia Village (五甲村), Yaxi, Shandong
- Wujia Village (伍家村), Langtang, Hunan
- Wujia Village (吴家村), Beisong
- Wujia Village (吴家村), Cha'ensi, Xiangtan
- Wujia Village (吴家村), Gaocheng, Dengfeng, Zhengzhou, Henan Province, China
- Wujia Village (吴家村), Huazhou Subdistrict
- Wujia Village (吴家村), Lijia Township, Qingliu, Fujian Province, China
- Wujia Village (吴家村), Meijiang, Lianyuan
- Wujia Village (吴家村), Qixingjie
- Wujia Village (吴家村), Zilong, Lengshuijiang, Loudi, Hunan Province, China
- Wujia Village (吴贾村), Beiwangli
- Wujia Village (五甲里), Guanmiao District, Tainan, Taiwan
- Cianjhen Senior High School metro station, of which name of secondary station is Wujia
