= Huazhou =

Huazhou may refer to:

- Huazhou, Guangdong (化州市), a county-level city in Guangdong
- Huazhou District (华州区), a district in Weinan, Shaanxi
  - Huazhou Subdistrict, Weinan (华州街道), subdivision of Huazhou District
- Huazhou Subdistrict, Guangzhou (zh; 华洲街道), subdivision of Haizhu District, Guangzhou, Guangdong
- Huazhou Subdistrict, Dengzhou (花洲街道), subdivision of Dengzhou, Henan
- Hua Zhou (zh; 花粥), Chinese folk singer.

== Historical prefectures ==
- Hua Prefecture (Shaanxi) (華州), a historical prefecture in modern Shaanxi between the 6th and 20th centuries
- Hua Prefecture (Henan) (滑州), a historical prefecture in modern Henan between the 6th and 14th centuries
- Hua Prefecture (Guangdong) (化州), a historical prefecture in modern Guangdong between the 10th and 20th centuries

== See also ==
- Hua (disambiguation)
