= Yuanli (disambiguation) =

Yuanli is an urban township in southern Miaoli County, Taiwan.

Yuanli may also refer to:

- Yuanli Community (院里社区), Taohong, Longhui County, Hunan Province, China
- Yuanli railway station, a railway station on the Taiwan Railways Administration West Coast line
- Yuanli Village (远利村), Meijiang, Lianyuan, Hunan Province, China
- Li Yuanli, Prince Xukang (徐康王 李元禮/李元礼; 619–672), tenth son of the Emperor Gaozu of Tang
- Suo Yuanli (died 691), a secret police official during the Chinese Tang dynasty and Wu Zetian's Zhou dynasty
- Cui Dunli (596–656), né Cui Yuanli, an official, general, and diplomat of the Chinese Tang dynasty
- Shi Yinshun (born 1974), courtesy name Yuanli, a Chinese Buddhist monk
- Zhang Hongjing (760–824), courtesy name Yuanli, an official of the Tang dynasty of China
