= Gaotang (disambiguation) =

Gaotang (高唐县) is a county of Liaocheng, Shandong, People's Republic of China (PRC).

Gāotáng (高塘 unless otherwise noted) may also refer to the following locations in the PRC:

- Gaotang, Huoqiu County, town in Anhui
- Gaotang, Fujian (高唐镇), town in Jiangle County
- Gaotang, Guangdong (高堂镇), town in Raoping County
- Gaotang, Shaanxi, town in Hua County
- Gaotang Township, Anhui, in Dingyuan County
- Gaotang Township, Jiangxi, in De'an County
- Gaotang Township, Hunan, in Hengdong County
