= Fengping =

Fengping (simplified Chinese: 枫坪镇; traditional Chinese: 楓坪鎮; pinyin: Fēngpíng Zhèn) or (simplified Chinese: 风平镇; traditional Chinese: 風平鎮; pinyin: Fēngpíng Zhèn), may refer to:

- Fengping, Lianyuan, a town in Lianyuan, Hunan, China.
- Fengping, Mangshi, a town in Mangshi, Yunnan, China.
