= Shi Benhuan =

Chinese Buddhist monk

- 释本焕

Personal life
- Born: Zhang Fengshan (張鳳山); Zhang Zhishan (張志山); September 21, 1907 Xinzhou District, Wuhan, Hubei, Qing Empire
- Died: April 2, 2012 (aged 104) Hongfa Temple, Luohu District, Shenzhen, Guangdong, China

Religious life
- Religion: Chan Buddhism
- School: Linji school
- Lineage: 44th generation
- Dharma name: Xinqian (心虔)

Senior posting
- Teacher: Hsu Yun
- Students: Shi Yinshun

Military service

Chinese name
- Traditional Chinese: 釋本煥
- Simplified Chinese: 释本焕
Transcriptions
Standard Mandarin
- Hanyu Pinyin: Shì Běnhuàn

Birth name
- Traditional Chinese: 張鳳山 or 張志山
- Simplified Chinese: 张凤山 or 张志山
Transcriptions
Standard Mandarin
- Hanyu Pinyin: Zhāng Fèngshān or Zhāng Zhìshān

Dharma name
- Chinese: 心虔
Transcriptions
Standard Mandarin
- Hanyu Pinyin: Xīnqián

Shi Benhuan (Chinese: 释本焕; pinyin: Shì Běnhuàn; 21 September 1907 – 2 April 2012) was a Buddhist monk, Chan master and religious leader in China. He held several abbatial posts, such as being first abbot of the Hongfa Temple in Shenzhen, Guangdong. He was also the honorary president of the Buddhist Association of China in 2010, holding the position until his death in 2012.

== Early life ==
Benhuan was born as Zhang Zhishan (张志山) in 1907 in Xinzhou, Hubei Province. He went to the old-style private school when he was 7 years old and became an apprentice in the local grocery store. When in his twenties, Zhang gave up home life and took tonsure in the Baoen Temple.

== Religious life ==
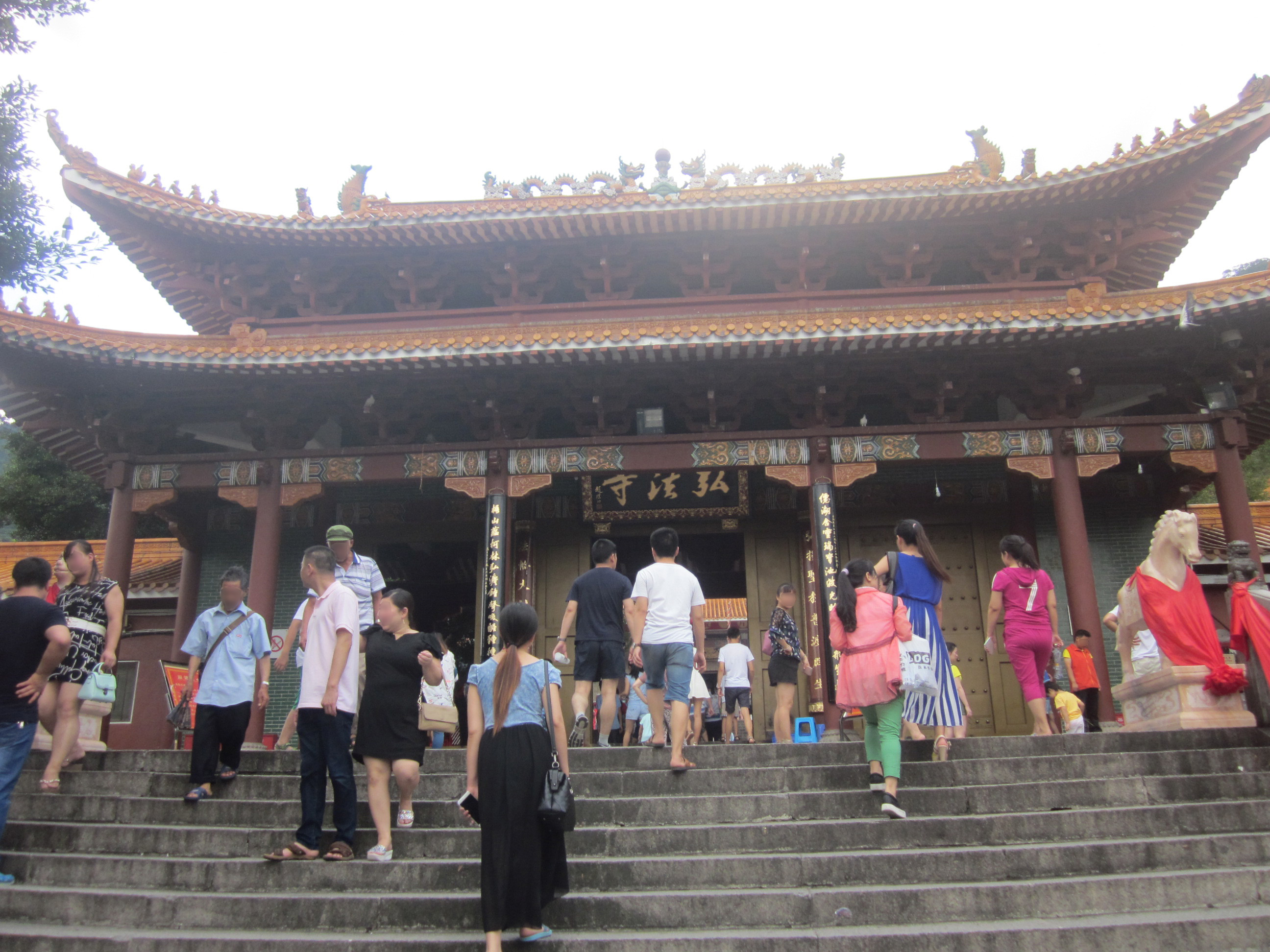
Hongfa Temple, a Buddhist temple in Shenzhen, South Central China's Guangdong, where Benhuan lived until he died.

In 1930, he went to Baotong Temple to receive and uphold precepts in Wuchang. In that same year, he came to the Gaoyu Temple and formally acknowledged Laiguo as his master, where he spent 7 years in practicing the Dharma. In February 1937, he spared no effort to worship at the shrine on Mount Wutai and then lived in Bishan temple. Two years later, he became the third Master Monk Guan there.

In 1947, he visited many other temples all over China, namely Mile Monastery in Beijing, Jushi Lodge in Tianjin and Puji Temple in Shanghai. In 1948, he left Mount Wutai for Nanhua Temple in Guangdong Province to take the place of Master Hsu Yun. In January 1949, he acceded to the abbotship of Nanhua temple. In April, 1980, the people's government of Huanan county and the Buddhist community invited him to be the abbot of Biechuan Temple in Danxia Mountain. In January 1987 he acceded to the abbotship of Guangxiao Temple in Guangzhou; from 1992 to 2008 he was elected the abbot of Hongfa Temple, at that point in time he was known as the "Greatest in Chinese Buddhism".

As a religious leader in Mainland China, Benhuan served as honorary president of the Buddhist Association of China (a post he was elected to in 2010), honorary president of the Buddhist Association of Hubei Province and Guangdong Province, the president of the Shenzhen Buddhism Association, the honorary president of the Buddhist Association of Shaoguan City, and the Chinese People's Political Consultative Conference in Guangdong Province.

== Influence ==
Benhuan became a monk in 1930 and was the 44th generation lineage holder of the Linji school. He promoted Buddhism in more than 20 countries and regions, attracting more than 2 million followers.

He was regarded as an eminent Buddhist both in China and overseas. He was also a generous philanthropist. During his 80 years of Buddhist practice, he donated more than 10 million yuan (US $1.59 million) to building roads, schools and hospitals across the country. Hongfa Temple's donations and contributions to public facilities and charitable organizations totaled more than 50 million yuan.

He became a centenarian in 2007, and died on April 2, 2012, age 104. Benhuan died in the Hongfa Temple in Shenzhen, Guangdong Province, according to an announcement of the temple posted on its official website.
