= Doulishan =

Doulishan Town 斗笠山镇
- Town
- Location in Hunan
- Coordinates: 27°42′20″N 111°51′22″E
- Country: People's Republic of China
- Province: Hunan
- Prefecture-level city: Loudi
- County-level city: Lianyuan

Area
  - Total: 80 km^{2} (31 sq mi)

Population
  - Total: 50,000
  - Density: 630/km^{2} (1,600/sq mi)
- Time zone: UTC+8 (China Standard)
- Area code: 0738

Doulishan Town (simplified Chinese: 斗笠山镇; traditional Chinese: 斗笠山鎮; pinyin: Dǒulìshān Zhèn) is an urban town in and subdivision of Lianyuan, Hunan Province, People's Republic of China.

== Administrative divisions ==
The town is divided into 40 villages and 1 community: Xianghuatai Community, Xianghua Village, Jinling Village, Tianjing Village, Dazhi Village, Bilin Village, Huimin Village, Shiba Village, Shaoyuan Village, Mingjing Village, Fangba Village, Zubao Village, Xingjia Village, Yanzhong Village, Shitang Village, Dongjie Village, Zengjiatang Village, Kengtian Village, Shengjiachong Village, Dongli Village, Yunpan Village, Huaiyuan Village, Taishang Village, Huanggang Village, Fengrui Village, Ganxi Village, Shaping Village, Baishu Village, Zigeng Village, Xiongjia Village, Dayang Village, Heguan Village, Ganquan Village, Gaota Village, Mabai Village, Tuoli Village, Hua'e Village, Jianshe Village, Baifeng Village, Shanyuan Village, and Tangxi Village (香花台社区、香花村、金铃村、天井村、大治村、碧林村、惠民村、石坝村、绍元村、明镜村、方八村、祖保村、兴家村、言忠村、石塘村、东界村、增家塘村、坑田村、盛家冲村、洞里村、云盘村、槐元村、台上村、黄港村、丰瑞村、甘溪村、沙坪村、柏树村、自耕村、熊家村、大样村、禾管村、甘泉村、高塔村、马白村、托里村、花萼村、建设村、白峰村、杉元村、塘溪村).
