= Jinshi, Lianyuan =

Jinshi Town 金石镇
- Town
- Location in Hunan
- Coordinates: 27°31′58″N 111°57′34″E
- Country: People's Republic of China
- Province: Hunan
- Prefecture-level city: Loudi
- County-level city: Lianyuan

Area
  - Total: 108 km^{2} (42 sq mi)

Population
  - Total: 58,000
  - Density: 540/km^{2} (1,400/sq mi)
- Time zone: UTC+8 (China Standard)
- Area code: 0738

Jinshi Town (simplified Chinese: 金石镇; traditional Chinese: 金石鎮; pinyin: Jīnshí Zhèn) is an urban town and subdivision of Lianyuan, Hunan Province, People's Republic of China.

== Administrative divisions ==
As of 2018, the town administers 29 villages and 1 community: Shashi Community (砂石社区), Helian Village (河联村), Yanjiang Village (岩江村), Shanmao Village (山茂村), Baitan Village (白潭村), Qili Village (七里村), Shuangtian Village (双田村), Daqiao Village (大桥村), Jiangbian Village (江边村), Xieqiao Village (谢桥村), Huangshi Village (黄石村), Qingchun Village (青春村), Guanxi Village (灌溪村), Longhe Village (龙和村), Hehe Village (和合村), Damei Village (大湄村), Xiaomei Village (小湄村), Batangling Village (坝塘岭村), Yanling Village (岩岭村), Dikang Village (迪康村), Bantian Village (湴田村), Changlin Village (常林村), Huguang Village (湖广村), Lashu'ao Village (腊树坳村), Taolinba Village (桃林坝村), Datangyuan Village (大塘园村), Hudong Village (湖洞村), Dongliping Village (董栗坪村), Shuanghe Village (双合村), and Tongyi Village (桐意村).
