= Xinshao County =

Xinshao 新邵县
- County
- Location in Hunan
- Coordinates: 27°19′16″N 111°27′32″E
- Country: People's Republic of China
- Province: Hunan
- Prefecture-level city: Shaoyang
- Time zone: UTC+8 (China Standard)

Xinshao County (simplified Chinese: 新邵县; traditional Chinese: 新邵縣; pinyin: Xīnshào Xiàn) is a county in the Province of Hunan, China. It is under the administration of Shaoyang City. Located in central Hunan, the county is bordered to the north by Lianyuan City, Lengshuijiang City and Xinhua County, to the west by Longhui County, and to the south by Shaoyang County and the city proper of Shaoyang. Xinshao County covers an area of 1,763 km^{2} (681 sq mi), and as of 2015, it had a registered population of 828,100 and a permanent resident population of 769,700. The county has 13 towns and two townships under its jurisdiction, and the county seat is Niangxi (酿溪镇).

== Administrative divisions ==
13 towns

- Chenjiafang (陈家坊镇)
- Cunshi (寸石镇)
- Daxin (大新镇)
- Jukoupu (巨口铺镇)
- Longxipu (龙溪铺镇)
- Niangxi (酿溪镇)
- Pingshang (坪上镇)
- Quetang (雀塘镇)
- Taizhimiao (太芝庙镇)
- Tanxi (潭溪镇)
- Xiaotang (小塘镇)
- Xintianpu (新田铺镇)
- Yantang (严塘镇)

2 townships

- Tanfu (潭府乡)
- Yingguang (迎光乡)

== Climate ==
Climate data for Xinshao, elevation 294 m (965 ft), (1991–2020 normals, extremes 1991–present)
Month	Jan	Feb	Mar	Apr	May	Jun	Jul	Aug	Sep	Oct	Nov	Dec	Year
Record high °C (°F)	27.3 (81.1)	30.3 (86.5)	32.6 (90.7)	34.6 (94.3)	36.7 (98.1)	37.7 (99.9)	39.1 (102.4)	40.0 (104.0)	38.1 (100.6)	36.1 (97.0)	32.1 (89.8)	23.5 (74.3)	40.0 (104.0)
Mean daily maximum °C (°F)	9.2 (48.6)	11.9 (53.4)	16.1 (61.0)	22.5 (72.5)	26.8 (80.2)	29.8 (85.6)	33.1 (91.6)	32.8 (91.0)	29.1 (84.4)	23.7 (74.7)	18.1 (64.6)	12.1 (53.8)	22.1 (71.8)
Daily mean °C (°F)	5.4 (41.7)	7.7 (45.9)	11.6 (52.9)	17.5 (63.5)	21.8 (71.2)	25.3 (77.5)	28.0 (82.4)	27.4 (81.3)	23.7 (74.7)	18.3 (64.9)	12.8 (55.0)	7.4 (45.3)	17.2 (63.0)
Mean daily minimum °C (°F)	2.7 (36.9)	4.8 (40.6)	8.4 (47.1)	13.8 (56.8)	18.1 (64.6)	21.9 (71.4)	23.9 (75.0)	23.5 (74.3)	20.0 (68.0)	14.7 (58.5)	9.2 (48.6)	4.1 (39.4)	13.8 (56.8)
Record low °C (°F)	−5.6 (21.9)	−6.5 (20.3)	−1.7 (28.9)	1.2 (34.2)	9.4 (48.9)	15.0 (59.0)	18.3 (64.9)	16.7 (62.1)	11.4 (52.5)	3.0 (37.4)	−1.3 (29.7)	−7.6 (18.3)	−7.6 (18.3)
Average precipitation mm (inches)	65.1 (2.56)	69.9 (2.75)	128.4 (5.06)	141.3 (5.56)	204.7 (8.06)	224.2 (8.83)	150.8 (5.94)	117.6 (4.63)	64.6 (2.54)	70.7 (2.78)	68.9 (2.71)	52 (2.0)	1,358.2 (53.42)
Average precipitation days (≥ 0.1 mm)	14.3	13.9	17.5	16.5	16.9	16.1	11.8	11.8	8.4	9.5	10.5	11.2	158.4
Average snowy days	3.9	2.5	0.5	0	0	0	0	0	0	0	0.2	1.5	8.6
Average relative humidity (%)	80	80	82	81	81	84	78	78	78	78	79	77	80
Mean monthly sunshine hours	59.1	58.1	74.6	105.8	129.4	131.4	212.5	197.3	147.8	121.4	109.8	88.1	1,435.3
Percentage possible sunshine	18	18	20	27	31	32	50	49	40	34	34	27	32
Source: China Meteorological Administration
