= Baima, Hunan =

Baima 白马镇
- Town
- Location in Hunan
- Coordinates: 27°34′30″N 111°41′55″E
- Country: People's Republic of China
- Province: Hunan
- Prefecture-level city: Loudi
- County-level city: Lianyuan
- Village-level divisions: 3 residential communities 22 villages
- Elevation: 166 m (545 ft)
- Time zone: UTC+8 (China Standard)
- Area code: 0738

Baima (simplified Chinese: 白马; traditional Chinese: 白馬; pinyin: Báimǎ; lit. 'white horse') is a town under the administration of Lianyuan City in central Hunan province, China, situated about 13 kilometres (8.1 mi) to the south-southeast of downtown Lianyuan. As of 2020, it has two residential communities (社区) and 23 villages under its administration.

== Administrative divisions ==
The town is divided into 22 villages and three communities, including:

- Tianxinping Community (田心坪社区)
- Baima Community (白马社区)
- Luojiaping Community (罗家坪社区)
- Zhaojia Village (赵家村)
- Sanxie Village (三协村)
- Xunan Village (徐南村)
- Yuxi Village (郁溪村)
- Niujiaoshan Village (牛角山村)
- Quantang Village (泉塘村)
- Zoujia Village (邹家村)
- Hongtian Village (洪田村)
- Geshan Village (隔山村)
- Lujiangbian Village (卢江边村)
- Santuan Village (三团村)
- Jiangxi Village (浆溪村)
- Sunjiaqiao Village (孙家桥村)
- Jianxin Village (建新村)
- Xianxiu Village (咸秀村)
- Hongquan Village (洪泉村)
- Guangyuan Village (广源村)
- Tenglong Village (腾龙村)
- Taolintang Village (桃林堂村)
- Tongbai Village (桐柏村)
- Jinbian Village (金边村)
- Wenhua Village (文化村)
