= Niangxi =

Town in Hunan, China

Coordinates: 27°19′21″N 111°27′19″E

Niangxi Town (Chinese: 酿溪镇; pinyin: Niàngxī Zhèn) is a town and the county seat of Xinshao County in Hunan, China. The town was originally formed as a township, reorganized as a town in 1953. It is located in the south central Xinshao County, it is bordered by Shuangqing District and Daxiang District to the south, Xintianpu Town (Chinese: 新田铺镇) to the west, Yantang Town (Chinese: 严塘镇) to the north, and Quetang Town (Chinese: 雀塘镇) to the north. The town has an area of 63.5 km^{2} (24.5 sq mi) with a population of 92,299 (as of 2010 census). Through the amalgamation of village-level divisions in 2016, the town has 20 villages and 11 communities under its jurisdiction. Its seat is Niangxi Community (Chinese: 酿溪社区).

== Administrative divisions ==
Administrative divisions of Niangxi Town in 2016
villages or communities		villages	
English	Chinese	English	Chinese
Changtan Community	长滩社区	Guanchong Village	官冲村
Datang Community	大塘社区	Hanjiaping Village	韩家坪村
Daxin Community	大新社区	Huigongping Village	会公坪村
Linjiang Community	临江社区	Huilong Village	回龙村
Lishan Community	栗山社区	Jiutouyan Village	九头岩村
Niangxi Community	酿溪社区	Lingbei Village	岭背村
Xindong Community	新东社区	Pantian Village	畔田村
Xinlian Community	新涟社区	Shenjia Village	沈家村
Xinyang Community	新阳社区	Shibeilong Village	石背垅村
Xinyang Community	新阳社区	Tangkou Village	塘口村
Zibin Community	资滨社区	Tangren Village	汤仁村
Baishu Village	柏树村	Tuqiao Village	土桥村
Bajiao Village	芭蕉村	Wangjia Village	王家村
Chishui Village	赤水村	Xiaohuangtang Village	萧黄塘村
Datian Village	大田村	Zhexi Village	柘溪村
Dongyuan Village	东源村		

== Amalgamation of village-level divisions in 2016 ==
7 village and two communities reorganized through the amalgamation of village-level divisions in 2016
the present name		the amalgamation in 2016	
English	Chinese	English	Chinese
Chishui Village	赤水村	Heshu Village	禾树村
Chishui Village	赤水村	Shuangqiao Village	双桥村
Datian Village	大田村	Datian Village	大田村
Datian Village	大田村	Fenggong Village	凤公村
Shanwan Community	沙湾社区	Shanwan Community	沙湾社区
Shanwan Community	沙湾社区	Tanpo Village	潭婆村
Shenjia Village	沈家村	Shenjia Village	沈家村
Shenjia Village	沈家村	Shihui Village	石灰村
Tangren Village	汤仁村	Shuili Village	水利村
Tangren Village	汤仁村	Tangren Village	汤仁村
Tangkou Village	塘口村	Tangkou Village	塘口村
Tangkou Village	塘口村	Tuzi Village	兔子村
Tuqiao Village	土桥村	Tuqiao Village	土桥村
Tuqiao Village	土桥村	Yangshi Village	杨世村
Xinyang Community	新阳社区	Dengjia Village	邓家村
Xinyang Community	新阳社区	Xinyang Community	新阳社区
Xiaohuangtang Village	萧黄塘村	Leijia'ao Village	雷家坳村
Xiaohuangtang Village	萧黄塘村	Xiongjia Village	熊家村
