= Qiaotouhe =

Qiaotouhe Town 桥头河镇
- Town
- Location in Hunan
- Coordinates: 27°49′20″N 111°51′26″E
- Country: People's Republic of China
- Province: Hunan
- Prefecture-level city: Loudi
- County-level city: Lianyuan

Area
  - Total: 140 km^{2} (54 sq mi)

Population
  - Total: 111,000
  - Density: 790/km^{2} (2,100/sq mi)
- Time zone: UTC+8 (China Standard)
- Area code: 0738

Qiaotouhe Town (simplified Chinese: 桥头河镇; traditional Chinese: 橋頭河鎮; pinyin: Qiáotóuhé Zhèn) is an urban town in Lianyuan, Hunan Province, People's Republic of China.

== Administrative divisions ==
The town is divided into 83 villages and 4 communities:

- Qiaonan Community
- Qiaomei Community
- Guanlan Community
- Hongqiao Community
- Huazhi Village
- Qiaotouhe Village
- Qiaotoushan Village
- Shuiyuan Village
- Lumao Village
- Xingguang Village
- Longwan Village
- Shanmu Village
- Zhuxi Village
- Nidong Village
- Taiping Village
- Dafan Village
- Shiping Village
- Ganchong Village
- Qingtang Village
- Duzi Village
- Cuoshu Village
- Shiqiao Village
- Qingcao Village
- Fenghua Village
- Zicha Village
- Datang Village
- Shanchun Village
- Zhangtan Village
- Longjian Village
- Bailiu Village
- Mujia Village
- Qunjian Village
- Banv Village
- Xinguang Village
- Fengshu Village
- Shiyaotang Village
- Qunfeng Village
- Wujin Village
- Sanlongchong Village
- Fengyu Village
- Qinglong Village
- Tanshantang Village
- Shezhong Village
- Jingtang Village
- Yanzi Village
- Yuzhong Village
- Shidong Village
- Shigou Village
- Dashui Village
- Shuitong Village
- Yanxi Village
- Yeyatang Village
- Yangjia Village
- Wentang Village
- Xiashanwan Village
- Sanhe Village
- Xinhua Village
- Zhumu Village
- Hexing Village
- Gonghe Village
- Jietou Village
- Hejia Village
- Huamei Village
- Xinchang Village
- Huangzhu Village
- Tianxinwan Village
- Baihu Village
- Duanjiang Village
- Chetian Village
- Xinpei Village
- Wuxing Village
- Minzhu Village
- Zhongshan Village
- Jingkeng Village
- Guihua Village
- Shouhua Village
- Youcao Village
- Baiju Village
- Zhuhuang Village
- Houwan Village
- Motang Village
- Dongchong Village
- Dongshi Village
- Dawu Village
- Zhuze Village
- Daxin Village
