= Dutoutang =

Dutoutang Town 渡头塘镇
- Town
- Location in Hunan
- Coordinates: 27°46′36″N 111°53′03″E
- Country: People's Republic of China
- Province: Hunan
- Prefecture-level city: Loudi
- County-level city: Lianyuan

Area
  - Total: 31.29 km^{2} (12.08 sq mi)

Population
  - Total: 13,000
  - Density: 420/km^{2} (1,100/sq mi)
- Time zone: UTC+8 (China Standard)
- Area code: 0738

Dutoutang Town (simplified Chinese: 渡头塘镇; traditional Chinese: 渡頭塘鎮; pinyin: Dùtóutáng Zhèn) is an urban town in and subdivision of Lianyuan, Hunan Province, People's Republic of China.

== Administrative divisions ==
The town is divided into 40 villages: Lianxi Village, Shengqi Village, Yuanzi Village, Juhua Village, Tongling Village, Yinxi Village, Yinzhong Village, Zhushan Village, Guangmang Village, Quantang Village, Qiaoxi Village, Xiangyang Village, Wenming Village, Dongfeng Village, Xinping Village, Xinqi Village, Xintian Village, Xinlong Village, Rixin Village, Xinqiao Village, Xintangwan Village, Xuetangchong Village, Sanyuan Village, Songyuan Village, Jinlong Village, Yangliu Village, Qunfu Village, Tangbianwan Village, Yanghe Village, Hongjia Village, Xingping Village, Zengjia Village, Meizhuang Village, Caoxi Village, Yangming Village, Buxian Village, Hongxi Village, Tanshanwan Village, Shanshan Village, and Taoyuan Village (涟溪村、胜旗村、垣子村、菊花村、铜铃村、印溪村、印中村、竹山村、光芒村、泉塘村、桥溪村、向阳村、文明村、东风村、新坪村、新旗村、新田村、新龙村、日新村、新桥村、新塘湾村、学堂冲村、三元村、松源村、金龙村、杨柳村、群富村、塘边湾村、洋河村、洪家村、星坪村、增加村、美庄村、曹溪村、杨名村、步先村、红溪村、檀山湾村、杉山村、桃源村).
