= Lianyuan =

Lianyuan 涟源市
- County-level city
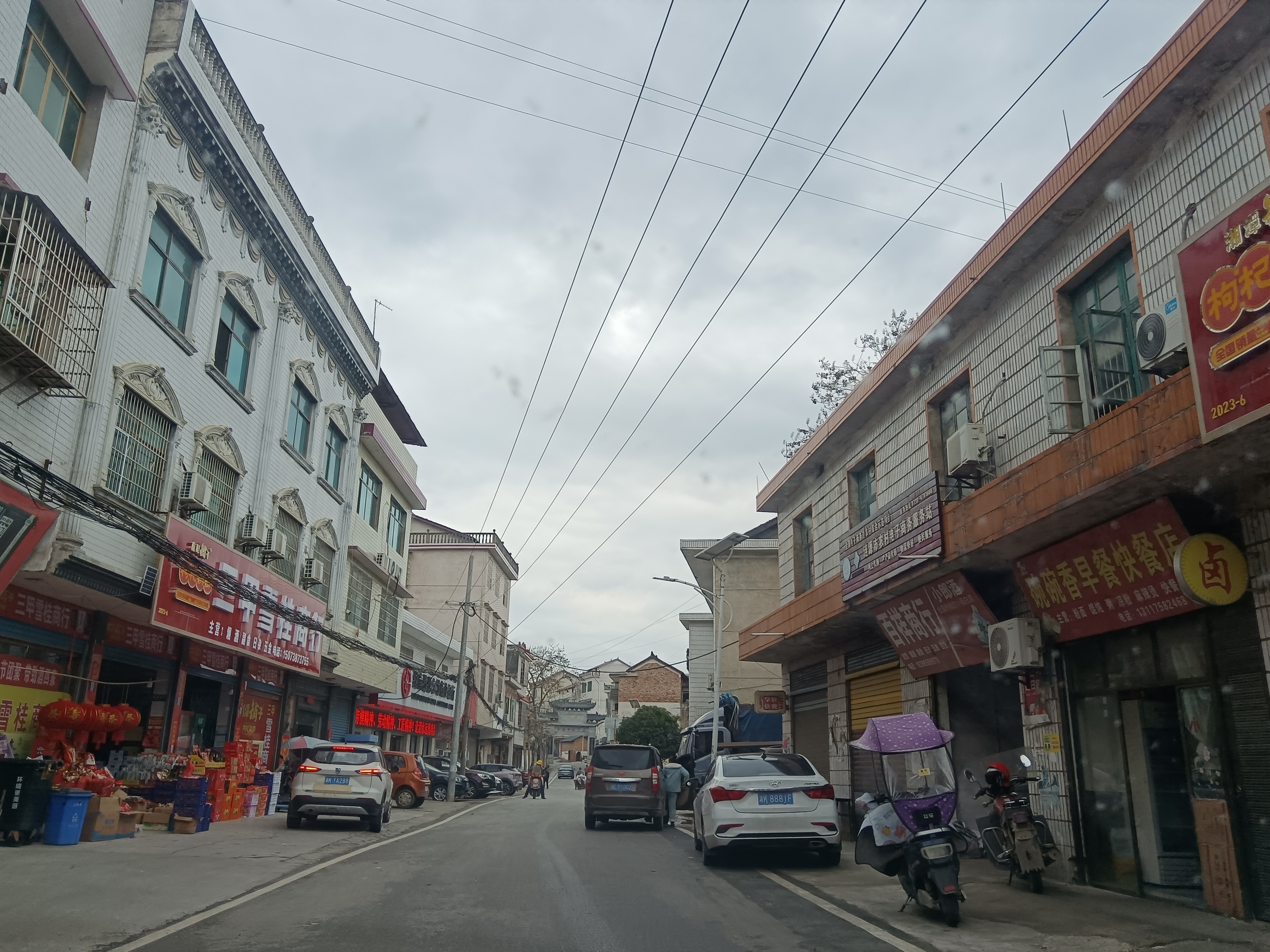
- Sanjia Township

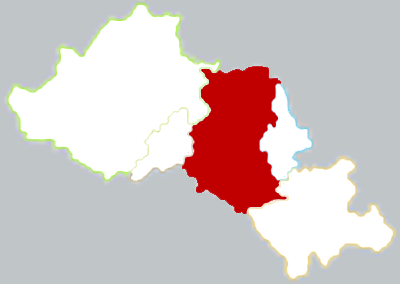
- Location of Lianyuan City within Loudi

- Location in Hunan
- Coordinates: 27°41′31″N 111°39′50″E
- Country: People's Republic of China
- Province: Hunan
- Prefecture-level city: Loudi

Area
  - County-level city: 1,830.01 km^{2} (706.57 sq mi)
  - Urban: 25.00 km^{2} (9.65 sq mi)

Population (2017)
  - County-level city: 894,000
  - Density: 489/km^{2} (1,270/sq mi)
  - Urban: 180,799
- Time zone: UTC+8 (China Standard)
- Postal code: 4171XX
- Website: lianyuan.gov.cn

Lianyuan (simplified Chinese: 涟源; traditional Chinese: 漣源; pinyin: Liányuán) is a county-level city and the 7th most populous county-level division in Hunan Province, China. It is under the administration of Loudi prefecture-level city. Located on the geographical centre of Hunan, the city is bordered to the north by Anhua and Ningxiang Counties, to the east by Louxing District, to the south by Shuangfeng, Shaodong and Xinshao Counties, to the west by Lengshuijiang City and Xinhua County. Lianyuan City covers 1,830.01 km^{2} (706.57 sq mi). As of the 2010 census, it has a registered population of 1,162,928 and a resident population of 995,712. The city has a subdistrict, 16 towns and two townships under its jurisdiction, the government seat is Lantian Subdistrict (蓝田街道).

== History ==
Dividing parts of four counties of Xiangxiang, Anhua, Xinhua and Shaoyang, Lianyuan County was created in February 1952 and named after the place where it is located in the origin of the Lian River. The county-level city of Loudi (modern Louxing District) was formed by seven communes from Lianyuan County (the modern Lianyuan City) in January 1961. The county of Lianyuan was reorganized as the city of Lianyuan in 1987.

Shuidongdi Town was transferred to Louxing District on January 24, 2017. The city of Lianyuan covers an area of 1,830.01 km^{2} (706.57 sq mi) with a population of 894,000 (as of 2017). It has 16 towns, two townships and a subdistrict under jurisdiction.

== Subdivisions ==
Shuidongdi Town from Lianyuan was transferred to Louxing District on January 24, 2017. The city of Lianyuan has two townships, 16 towns and a subdistrict under jurisdiction.

| English name | Chinese name | Area | Population | Density |
|---|---|---|---|---|
| Lantian Subdistrict | 蓝田街道 | 23.2 | 81,880 | 3,529 |
| Liumutang Town | 六亩塘镇 | 69.8 | 57,951 | 830 |
| Shimashan Town | 石马山镇 | 117.7 | 68,879 | 585 |
| Anping Town | 安平镇 | 91.2 | 40,867 | 448 |
| Meijiang Town | 湄江镇 | 118.6 | 45,212 | 381 |
| Fukou Town | 伏口镇 | 199.7 | 53,244 | 267 |
| Qiaotouhe Town | 桥头河镇 | 132.5 | 96,279 | 727 |
| Qixingjie Town | 七星街镇 | 156.9 | 68,681 | 438 |
| Yangshi Town | 杨市镇 | 119.5 | 70,205 | 587 |
| Fengping Town | 枫坪镇 | 41.6 | 22,532 | 542 |
| Doulishan Town | 斗笠山镇 | 73.9 | 47,803 | 647 |
| Baima Town | 白马镇 | 90.1 | 35,784 | 397 |
| Maotang Town | 茅塘镇 | 82.9 | 22,568 | 272 |
| Hetang Town | 荷塘镇 | 102.0 | 42,406 | 416 |
| Jinshi Town | 金石镇 | 110.8 | 50,791 | 458 |
| Longtang Town | 龙塘镇 | 102.5 | 64,513 | 629 |
| Dutoutang Town | 渡头塘镇 | 62.9 | 29,404 | 467 |
| Sanjia Township | 三甲乡 | 82.2 | 38,658 | 470 |
| Gutang Township | 古塘乡 | 52.0 | 17,112 | 329 |

== Climate ==
Climate data for Lianyuan, elevation 249 m (817 ft), (1991–2020 normals, extremes 1981–2010)
| Month | Jan | Feb | Mar | Apr | May | Jun | Jul | Aug | Sep | Oct | Nov | Dec | Year |
|---|---|---|---|---|---|---|---|---|---|---|---|---|---|
| Record high °C (°F) | 24.3 (75.7) | 31.0 (87.8) | 34.5 (94.1) | 35.7 (96.3) | 37.0 (98.6) | 37.5 (99.5) | 40.4 (104.7) | 40.9 (105.6) | 38.4 (101.1) | 35.6 (96.1) | 32.4 (90.3) | 24.9 (76.8) | 40.9 (105.6) |
| Mean daily maximum °C (°F) | 9.3 (48.7) | 11.9 (53.4) | 16.3 (61.3) | 22.8 (73.0) | 27.1 (80.8) | 30.1 (86.2) | 33.4 (92.1) | 33.0 (91.4) | 29.1 (84.4) | 23.7 (74.7) | 18.1 (64.6) | 12.1 (53.8) | 22.2 (72.0) |
| Daily mean °C (°F) | 5.5 (41.9) | 7.9 (46.2) | 11.8 (53.2) | 17.7 (63.9) | 22.1 (71.8) | 25.6 (78.1) | 28.5 (83.3) | 27.8 (82.0) | 23.8 (74.8) | 18.5 (65.3) | 12.9 (55.2) | 7.5 (45.5) | 17.5 (63.4) |
| Mean daily minimum °C (°F) | 2.9 (37.2) | 5.0 (41.0) | 8.6 (47.5) | 14.1 (57.4) | 18.5 (65.3) | 22.3 (72.1) | 24.8 (76.6) | 24.2 (75.6) | 20.4 (68.7) | 15.0 (59.0) | 9.5 (49.1) | 4.4 (39.9) | 14.1 (57.5) |
| Record low °C (°F) | −5.2 (22.6) | −4.6 (23.7) | −1.6 (29.1) | 2.1 (35.8) | 9.4 (48.9) | 13.3 (55.9) | 19.0 (66.2) | 16.8 (62.2) | 12.2 (54.0) | 3.2 (37.8) | −1.1 (30.0) | −9.6 (14.7) | −9.6 (14.7) |
| Average precipitation mm (inches) | 70.7 (2.78) | 76.4 (3.01) | 133.1 (5.24) | 167.3 (6.59) | 197.9 (7.79) | 253.3 (9.97) | 169.6 (6.68) | 121.7 (4.79) | 70.7 (2.78) | 71.1 (2.80) | 70.9 (2.79) | 52.8 (2.08) | 1,455.5 (57.3) |
| Average precipitation days (≥ 0.1 mm) | 13.8 | 14.1 | 18.1 | 16.6 | 16.6 | 16.0 | 10.9 | 11.6 | 8.6 | 9.7 | 10.7 | 11.3 | 158 |
| Average snowy days | 4.8 | 2.5 | 0.6 | 0 | 0 | 0 | 0 | 0 | 0 | 0 | 0.1 | 1.7 | 9.7 |
| Average relative humidity (%) | 80 | 80 | 82 | 81 | 81 | 83 | 78 | 78 | 78 | 79 | 79 | 78 | 80 |
| Mean monthly sunshine hours | 68.0 | 64.3 | 82.3 | 110.8 | 138.1 | 142.0 | 220.9 | 202.3 | 151.4 | 128.3 | 116.5 | 100.0 | 1,524.9 |
| Percentage possible sunshine | 21 | 20 | 22 | 29 | 33 | 34 | 52 | 50 | 41 | 36 | 36 | 31 | 34 |
Source: China Meteorological Administration

== Sites of interest ==
There is a twenty years old noodle restaurant in Lanxi Bridge.

== Transportation ==
- China National Highway 207
