= Daxin, Hunan =

Daxin 大新镇
- Town
- Location in Hunan
- Coordinates: 27°26′30″N 111°21′24″E
- Country: People's Republic of China
- Province: Hunan
- Prefecture-level city: Shaoyang
- County: Xinshao County
- Time zone: UTC+8 (China Standard)

Daxin (Chinese: 大新; pinyin: Dàxīn) is a town under the administration of Xinshao County, Hunan, China. As of 2020, it has five residential communities and 17 villages under its administration:

- Daxin Community
- Litan Community (栗滩社区)
- Dadong Community (大东社区)
- Cixi Community (磁溪社区)
- Longkouxi Community (龙口溪社区)
- Changfu Village (长扶村)
- Longding Village (龙顶村)
- Dengdong Village (邓东村)
- Tangxi Village (塘溪村)
- Xianan Village (下南村)
- Shentang Village (申塘村)
- Sanmentan Village (三门滩村)
- Molin Village (磨林村)
- Shangnanfu Village (上南府村)
- Sanhe Village (三和村)
- Shuangxi Village (双溪村)
- Shuanglong Village (双龙村)
- Yangtang Village (杨塘村)
- Huaxin Village (华新村)
- Tongguding Village (铜鼓顶村)
- Hexie Village (和谐村)
- Yanzhuxin Village (烟竹新村)
