= Gutang, Lianyuan =

Gutang Township 古塘乡
- Township
- Location in Hunan
- Coordinates: 27°53′43″N 111°38′22″E
- Country: People's Republic of China
- Province: Hunan
- Prefecture-level city: Loudi
- County-level city: Lianyuan

Area
  - Total: 56 km^{2} (22 sq mi)

Population
  - Total: 23,000
  - Density: 410/km^{2} (1,100/sq mi)
- Time zone: UTC+8 (China Standard)
- Area code: 0738

Gutang Township (simplified Chinese: 古塘乡; traditional Chinese: 古塘鄉; pinyin: Gǔtáng Xiāng) is a rural township in Lianyuan, Hunan Province, People's Republic of China.

== Administrative divisions ==
The township is divided into 24 villages: Gutang Village, Liangyuan Village, Shenjia Village, Xiaojia Village, Tangbian Village, Tangbian Village, Chexi Village, Qunshan Village, Dingjia Village, Shanfeng Village, Shatuo Village, Zhaojia Village, Poshi Village, Wangyan Village, Xin Village, Maitang Village, Dawanli Village, Pingling Village, Luoshan Village, Niubu Village, Chitang Village, Zhulian Village, Fuxin Village, Fengmu Village, and Dahushan Village (古塘村、良院村、申家村、肖家村、塘边村、车溪村、群山村、丁家村、杉凤村、砂托村、赵家村、破石村、望岩村、新村、麦塘村、大湾里村、坪岭村、落山村、牛埠村、池塘村、竹联村、复新村、枫木村、大虎山村).

== Phoenix School for Girls ==
The dormitory at Phoenix School for Girls. This is the oldest building in the school.

The Phoenix School for Girls (Chinese: 飞风研修中心) was a non-profit secondary school for girls in rural Poshi Village (破石村) in Gutang. The school was established to address the shortage of educational options for rural girls, who are often denied education due to the cost of tuition. The school is the product of collaborations between the local community and the American Friends Service Committee. The first class graduated in June 2005.
