= Hongfa Temple =

Buddhist temple in Shenzhen, China

- 弘法寺
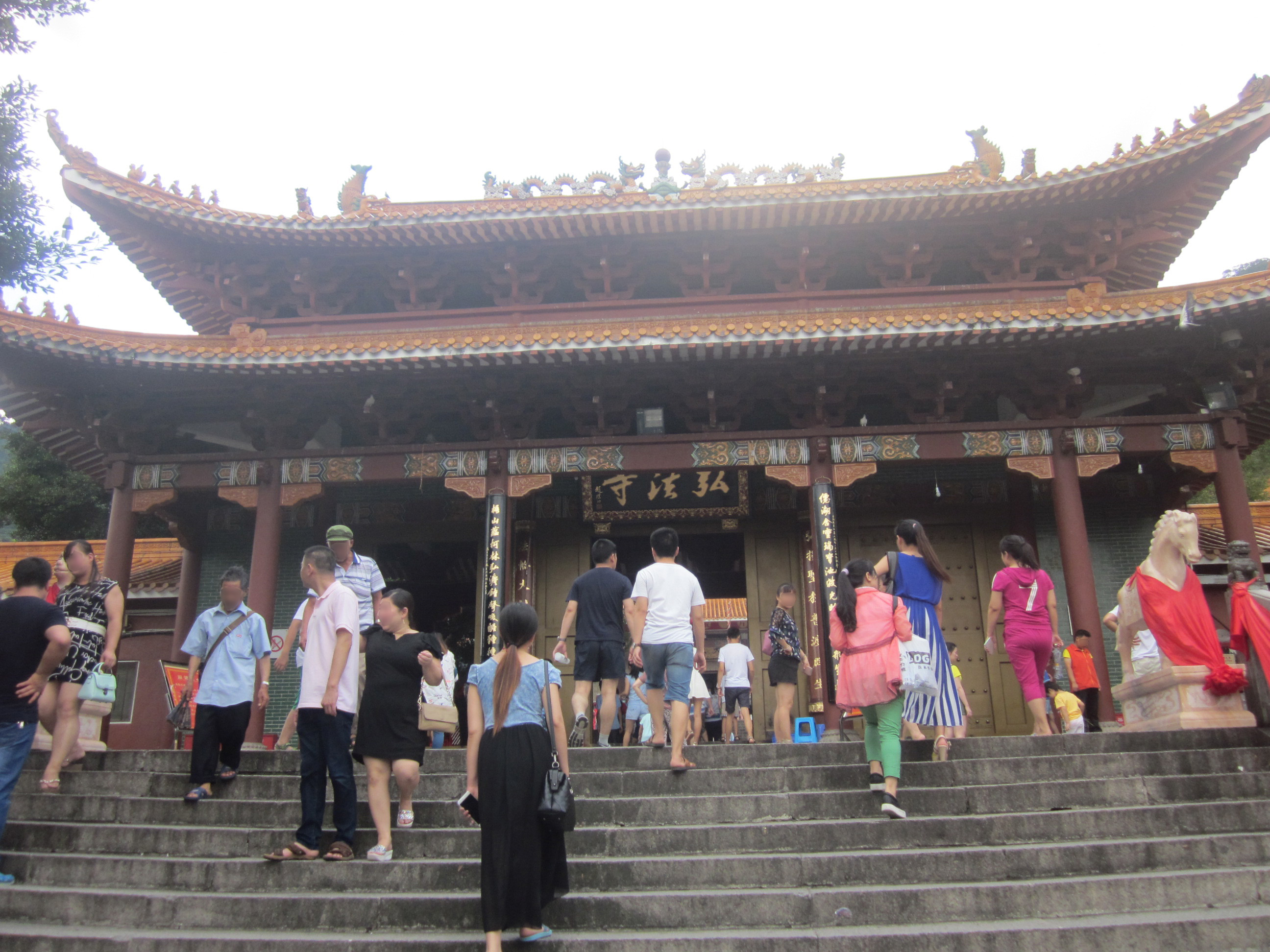
- Temple Gate.

- Location within Guangdong Location within China

Religion
- Affiliation: Buddhism
- Sect: Chan - Linji school

Location
- Location: Xianhu Botanic garden, Luohu District, Shenzhen, Guangdong
- Country: China
- Interactive map of Hongfa Temple
- Coordinates: 22.58062°N 114.17661°E

Architecture
- Founder: Benhuan
- Completed: 1985

Website
- www.hongfasi.net

Hongfa Temple
- Chinese: 弘法寺
Transcriptions
Standard Mandarin
- Hanyu Pinyin: Hóngfǎ Sì
Yue: Cantonese
- Jyutping: wang4 faat3 zi6*2

Hongfa Temple (Chinese: 弘法寺; pinyin: Hóngfǎ Sì; Jyutping: Wang4 Faat3 Zi6*2) is a Buddhist temple located at Fairylake Botanical Garden, Luohu District, Shenzhen, Guangdong, China.

== History ==
Hongfa Temple was built in 1985 by Chan master Benhuan. The construction lasted from July 1985 to June 1992.

== Architecture ==
The temple is at the foot of Wutong Mountain. The temple consists of forty buildings. The complex includes the following halls: Shanmen, Mahavira Hall, Hall of Four Heavenly Kings, Hall of Guanyin, Bell tower, Drum tower, Founder's Hall, Dharma Hall, Dining Room, etc.

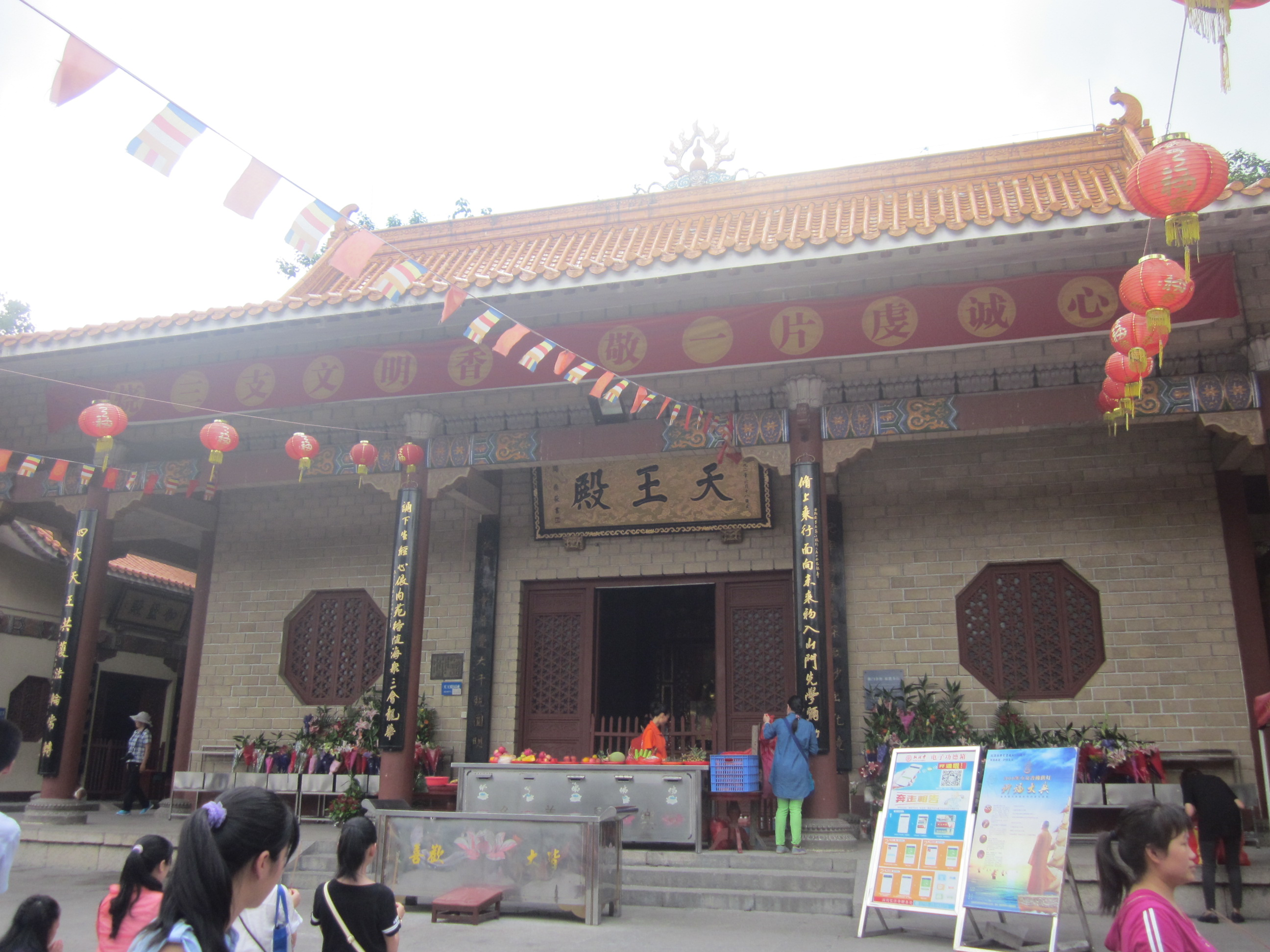
The Hall of Four Heavenly Kings.

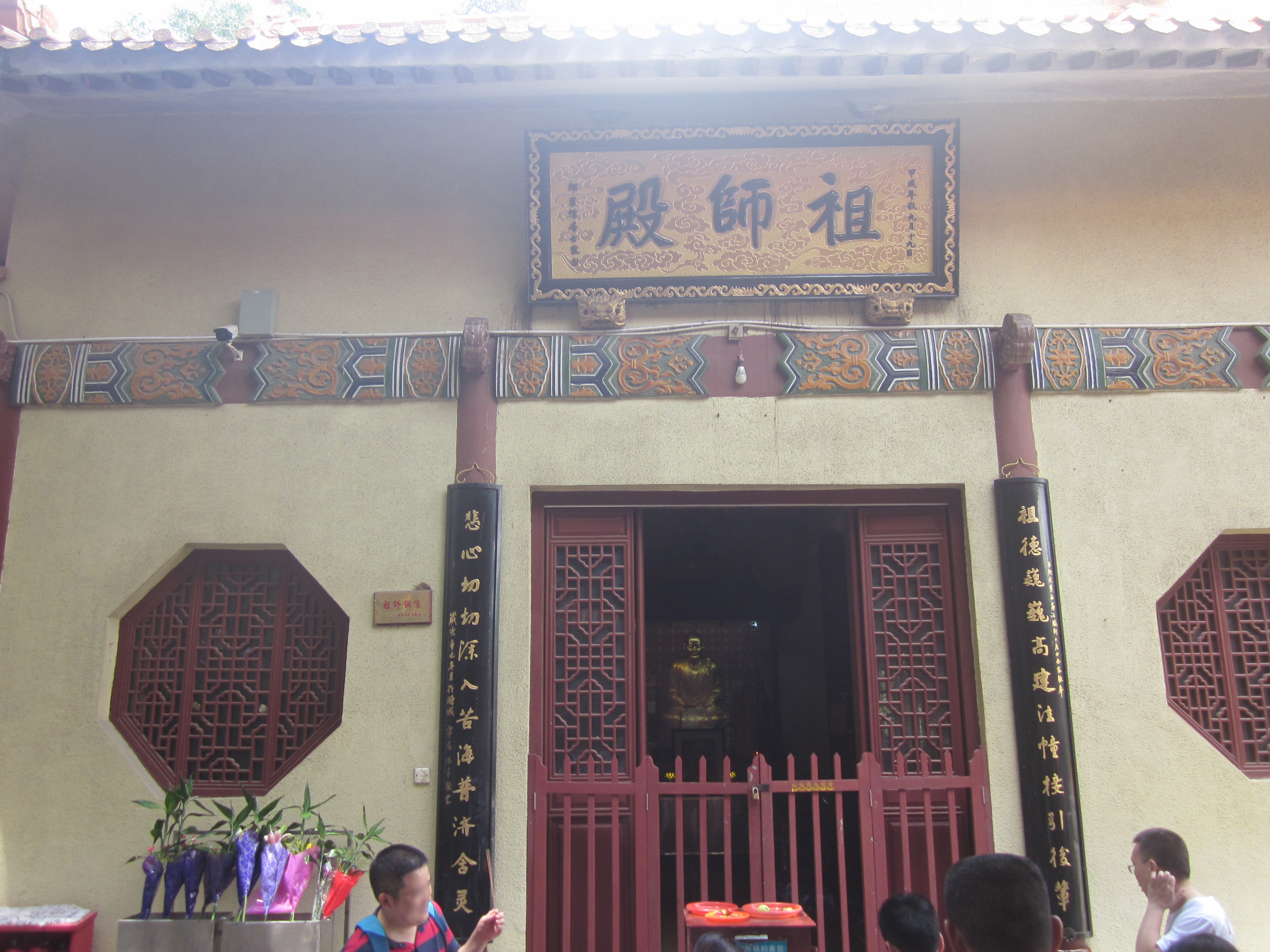
The Founder's Hall.

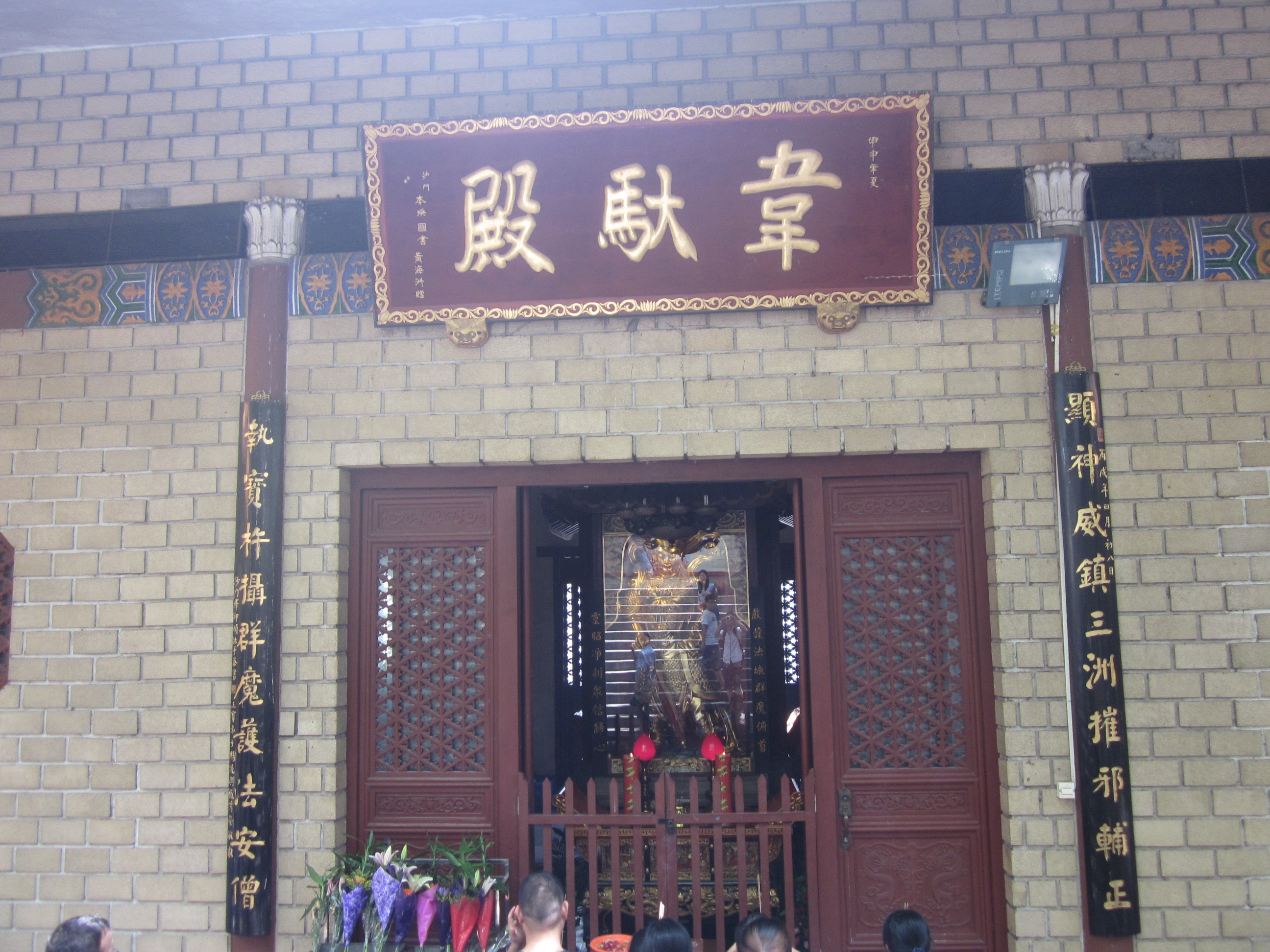
The Hall of Skanda.

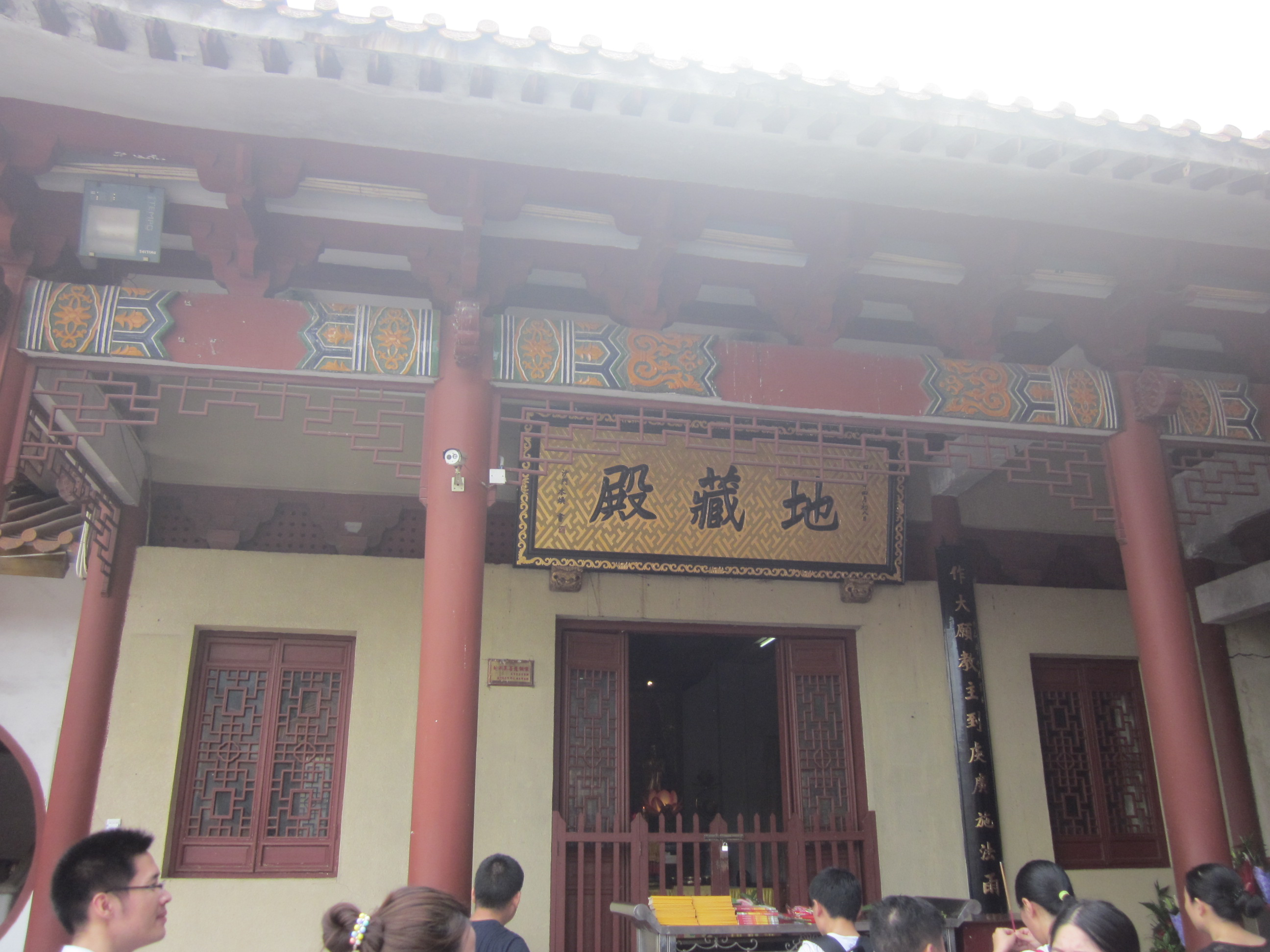
The Hall of Kshitigarbha.

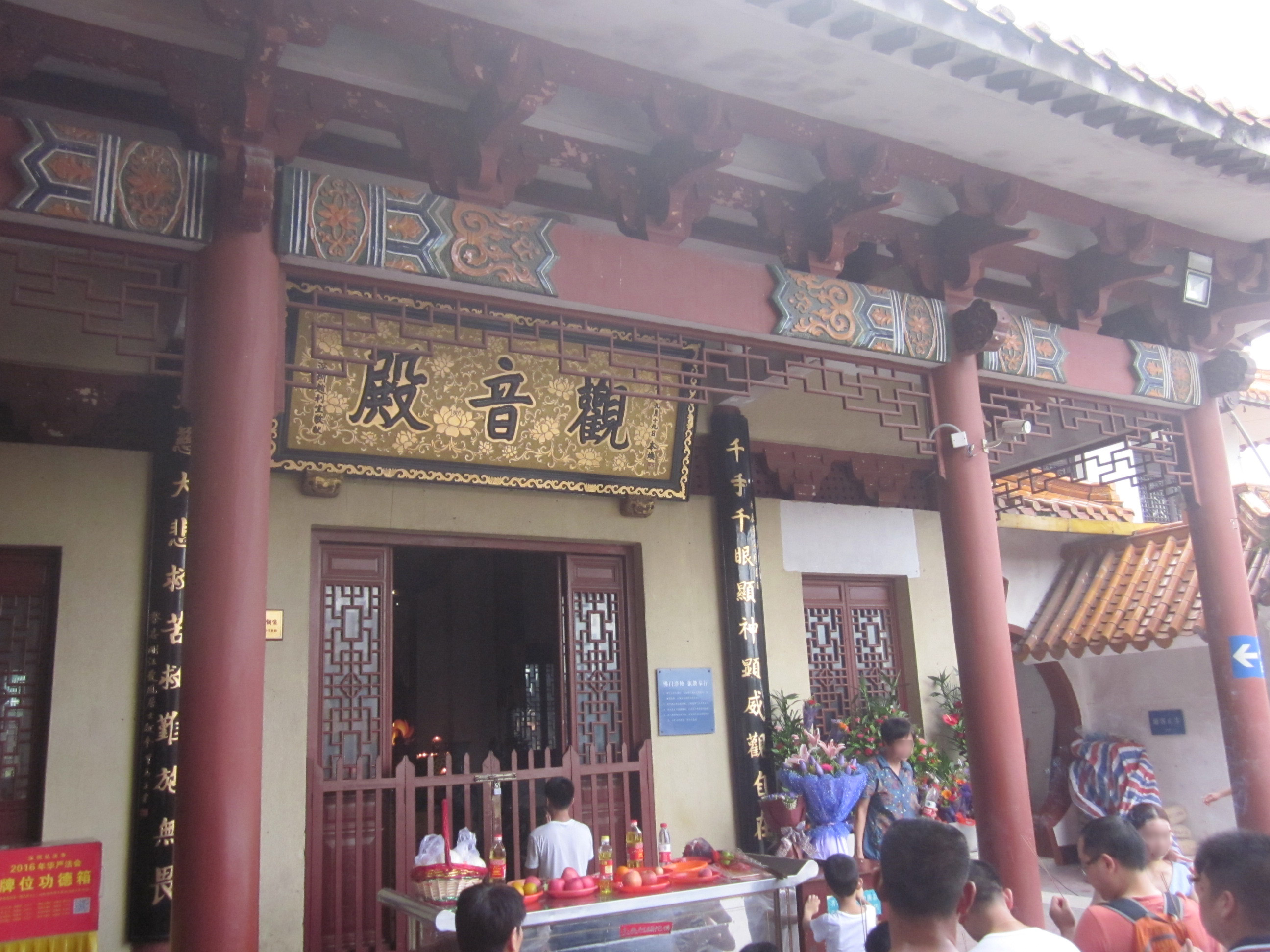
The Hall of Guanyin.

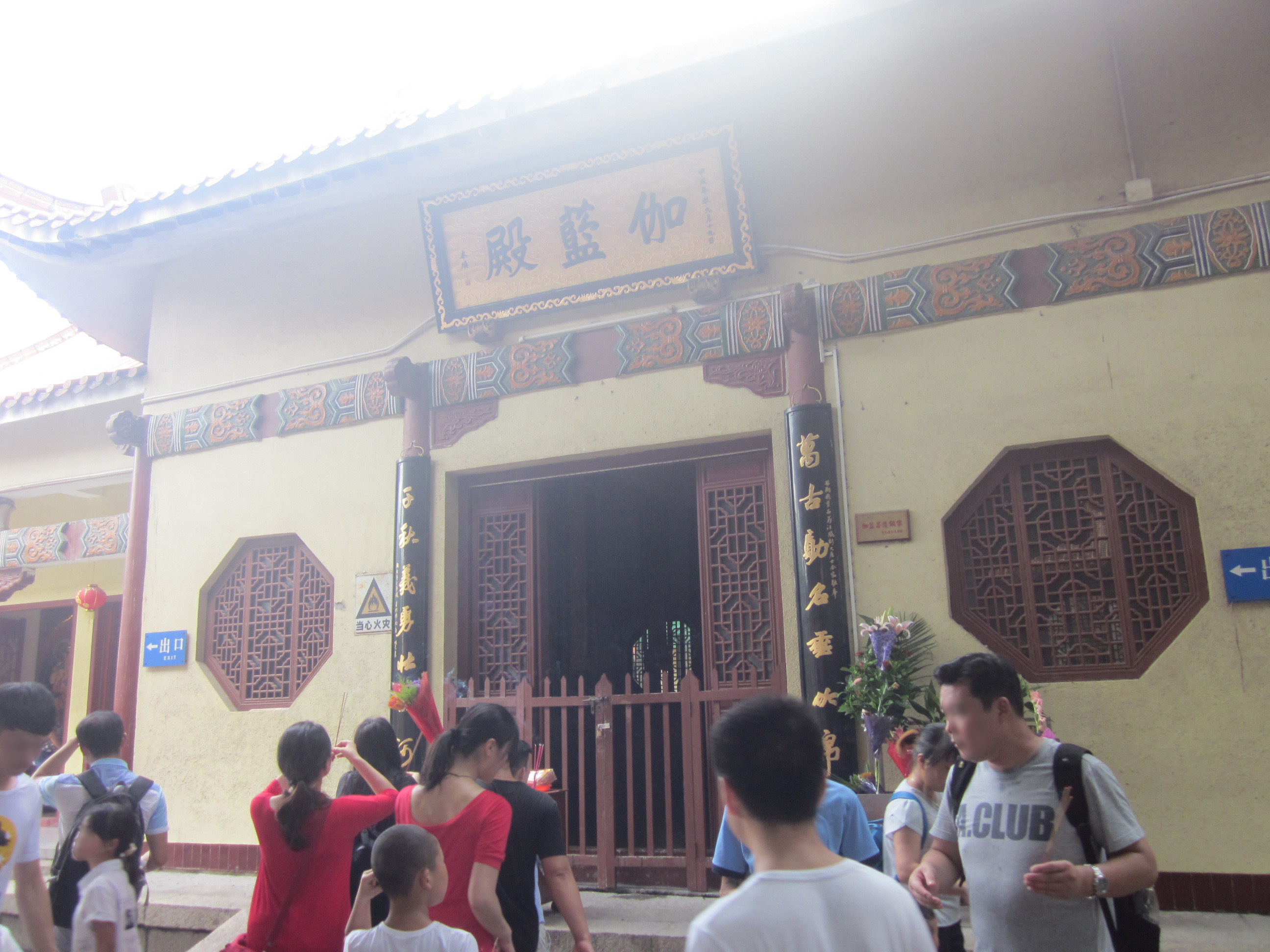
The Hall of Shichidō garan.

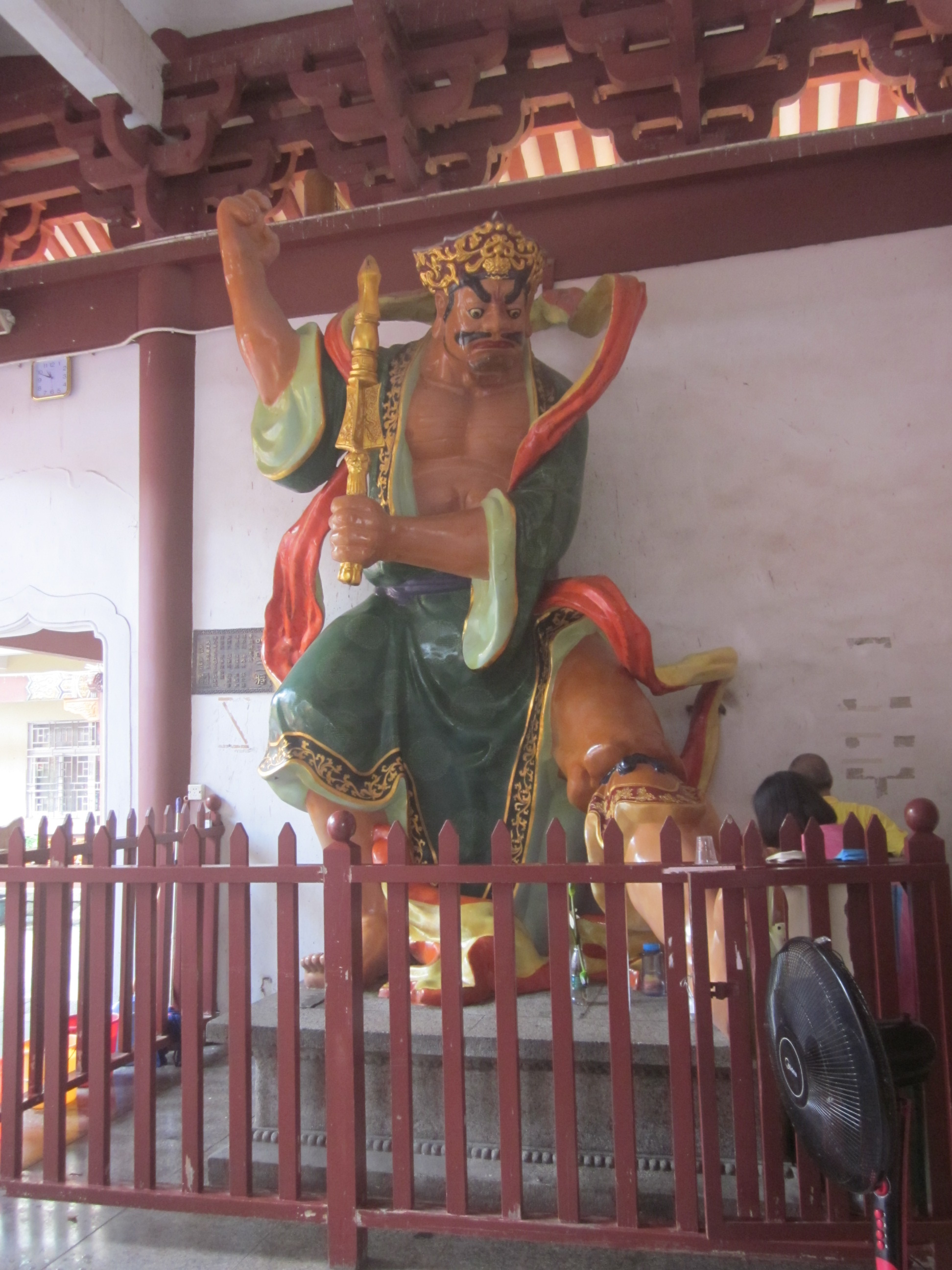
General Heng (哼将军) inside in the Sanmon of Hongfa Temple. The generic name for statues with an open mouth is agyō (哈将军 lit. "a" shape), that for those with a closed mouth ungyō (哼将军 lit. "un" shape").

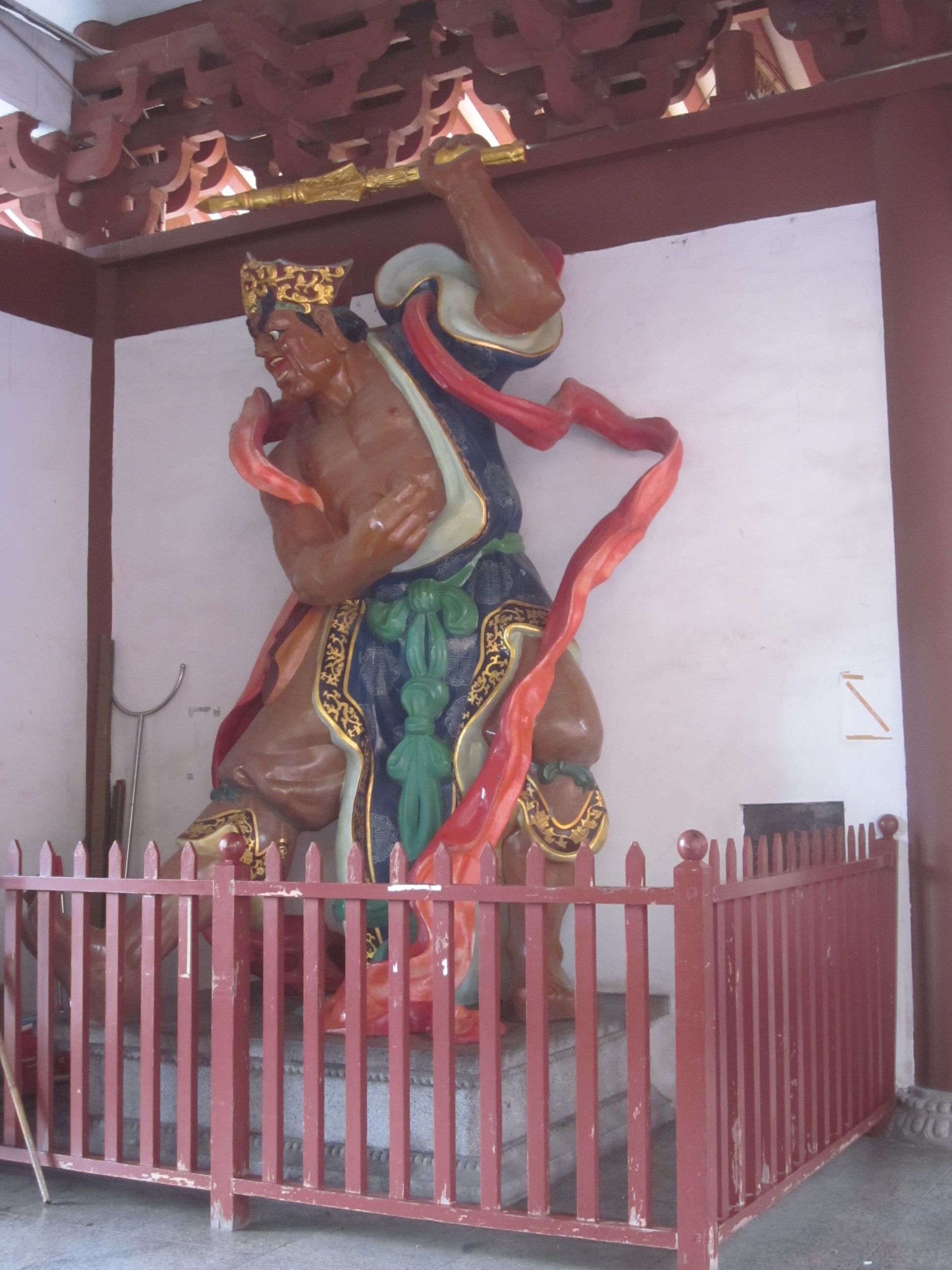
General Ha (哈将军) inside in the Sanmon of Hongfa Temple. The generic name for statues with an open mouth is agyō (哈将军 lit. "a" shape), that for those with a closed mouth ungyō (哼将军 lit. "un" shape").

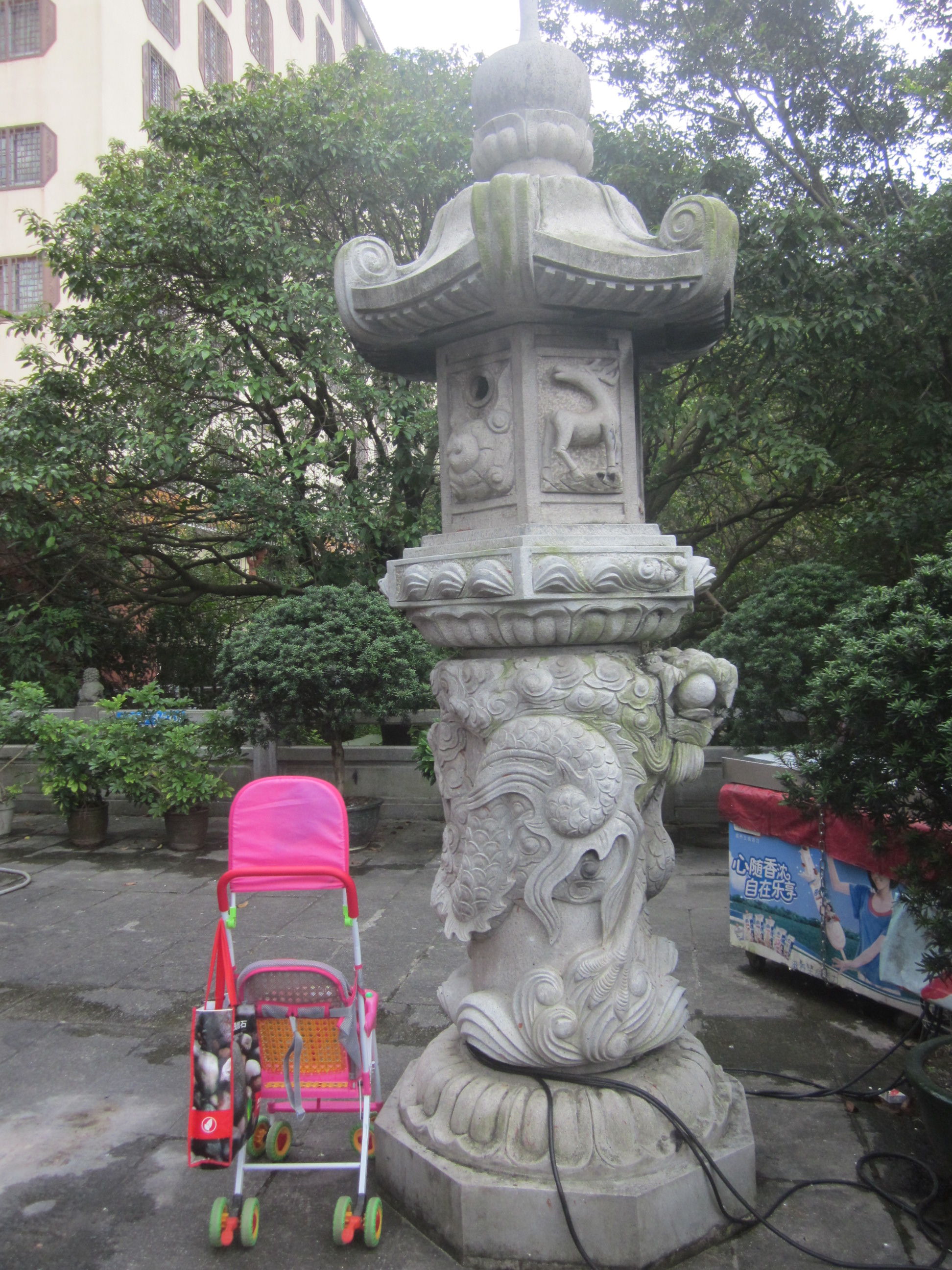
A Stone lantern (Tōrō) in front of Hongfa Temple.

== Famous monks ==
- Benhuan
- Shi Yinshun
