= Fukou, Lianyuan =

Fukou Town 伏口镇
- Town
- Location in Hunan
- Coordinates: 27°57′15″N 111°47′40″E
- Country: People's Republic of China
- Province: Hunan
- Prefecture-level city: Loudi
- County-level city: Lianyuan

Area
  - Total: 182.7 km^{2} (70.5 sq mi)

Population
  - Total: 55,000
  - Density: 300/km^{2} (780/sq mi)
- Time zone: UTC+8 (China Standard)
- Area code: 0738

Fukou Town (simplified Chinese: 伏口镇; traditional Chinese: 伏口鎮; pinyin: Fúkǒu Zhèn) is an urban town in and subdivision of Lianyuan, Hunan Province, People's Republic of China.

== Administrative divisions ==
The town is divided into 62 villages and 1 community:

- Fukou Community
- Lijia Village
- Huishuiwan Village
- Wujiaqiao Village
- Changtang Village
- Chixing Village
- Wenxi Village
- Jiangbai Village
- Baijia Village
- Bajiao Village
- Pengjia Village
- Chenjia Village
- Banshan Village
- Shizi Village
- Fukou Village
- Linjia Village
- Hejiadang Village
- Banpai Village
- Maoyuan Village
- Liangxiang Village
- Songshan Village
- Xujia Village
- Daxing Village
- Dabo Village
- Hujiaping Village
- Paixia Village
- Dazhu Village
- Jinpan Village
- Wenquan Village
- Yijia Village
- Chang'ao Village
- Luosi Village
- Ganhe Village
- Huashan Village
- Yujia Village
- Shilian Village
- Qishu Village
- Long'an Village
- Gantang Village
- Dawan Village
- Shaxi Village
- Huangchen Village
- Jianhua Village
- Canming Village
- Dajia Village
- Dacha Village
- Guojia Village
- Zhangjia Village
- Jianmin Village
- Wutongyuan Village
- Xinkai Village
- Wanshou Village
- Jintie Village
- Biaojiang Village
- Zetang Village
- Maogongyan Village
- Yanziyuan Village
- Dama Village
- Baishu Village
- Meiwan Village
- Zhongma Village
- Longtou Village
- Xiakou Village
