= Longtang, Lianyuan =

Longtang Town 龙塘镇
- Town
- Location in Hunan
- Coordinates: 27°46′38″N 111°45′05″E
- Country: People's Republic of China
- Province: Hunan
- Prefecture-level city: Loudi
- County-level city: Lianyuan

Area
  - Total: 105.48 km^{2} (40.73 sq mi)

Population
  - Total: 70,000
  - Density: 660/km^{2} (1,700/sq mi)
- Time zone: UTC+8 (China Standard)
- Area code: 0738

Longtang Town (simplified Chinese: 龙塘镇; traditional Chinese: 龍塘鎮; pinyin: Lóngtáng Zhèn) is an urban town and a subdivision of Lianyuan, Hunan Province, in the People's Republic of China.

== Administrative divisions ==
The town is divided into 65 villages:

- Changchong Village
- Shuizhu Village
- Fuhong Village
- Qunli Village
- Matou Village
- Wenxin Village
- Shitai Village
- Hesheng Village
- Hexi Village
- Yunxiao Village
- Zhumei Village
- Dongbian Village
- Hedong Village
- Shilu Village
- Xinquan Village
- Jiangkou Village
- Shuangsheng Village
- Shangbai Village
- Kuanjia Village
- Maotangwan Village
- Shangshitang Village
- Longtang Village
- Dongting Village
- Zhanjiang Village
- Fengmu Village
- Zhekou Village
- Jingbian Village
- Daping Village
- Mafang Village
- Helian Village
- Qixin Village
- Donghua Village
- Dongchong Village
- Qibao Village
- Baiyang Village
- Taomei Village
- Lishanwan Village
- Leimingtang Village
- Zhexi Village
- Liuhe Village
- Lianhua Village
- Helin Village
- Xiexing Village
- Xiaxing Village
- Zhaoyi Village
- Wenli Village
- Jianxing Village
- Shexing Village
- Guantang Village
- Xinshiqiao Village
- Gaoxing Village
- Cha'ao Village
- Nanfeng Village
- Pingli Village
- Wailang Village
- Baimei Village
- Wenji Village
- Shuanghe Village
- Shilu Village
- Dihua Village
- Luojia Village
- Wocao Village
- Hongxing Village
- Dongjia Village
- Jinji Village
