= Huazhou District =

Huazhou District 华州区
- District
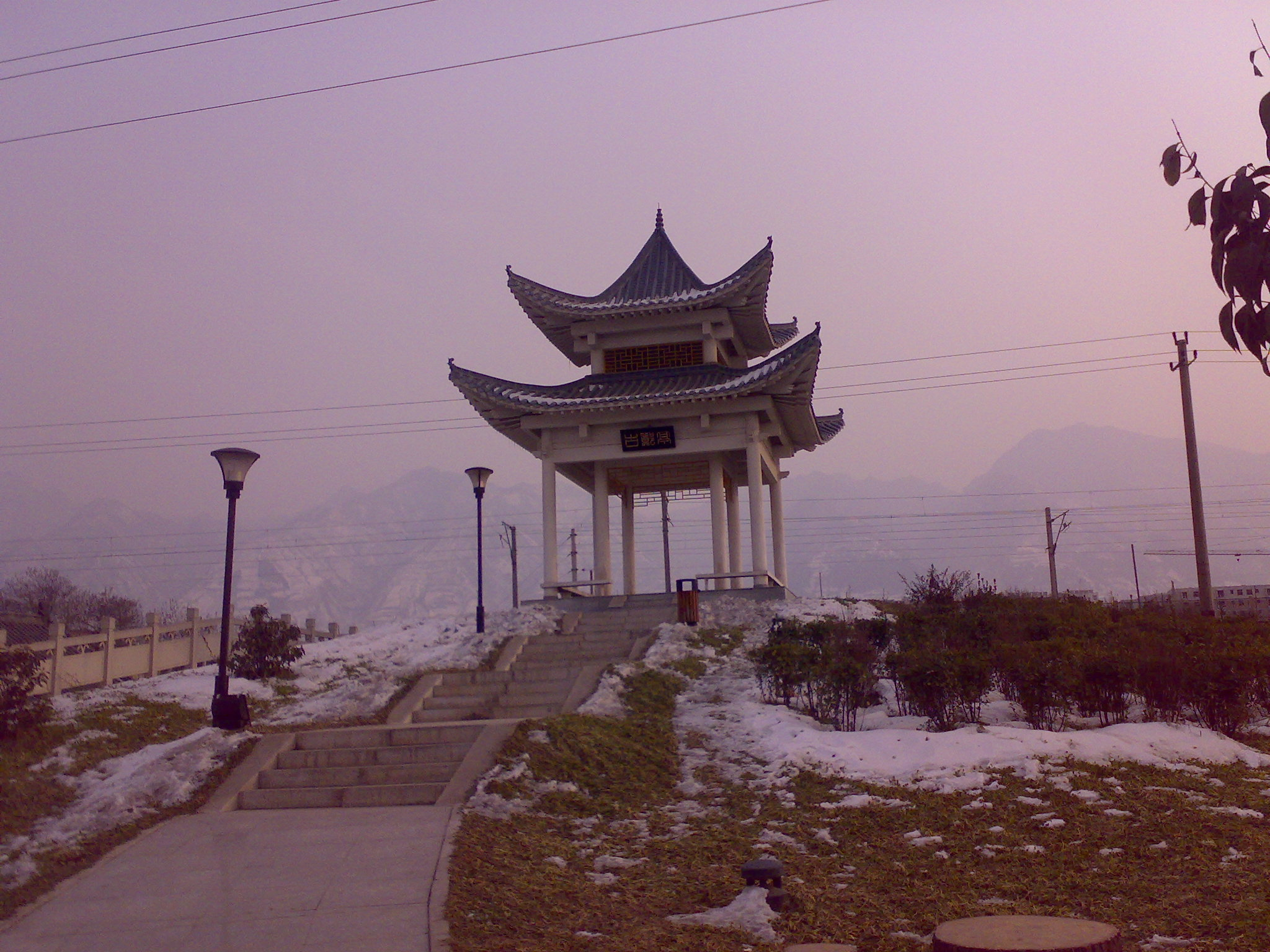
- A park in Huazhou District

- Huazhou District in China
- Coordinates: 34°27′N 109°45′E
- Country: People's Republic of China
- Province: Shaanxi
- Prefecture-level city: Weinan

Area
  - Total: 1,127.9 km^{2} (435.5 sq mi)

Population (2012)
  - Total: 324,300
  - Density: 287.5/km^{2} (744.7/sq mi)
- Time zone: UTC+8 (China Standard)
- Postal code: 714100
- Area code: 0913
- Website: huaxian.gov.cn

Huazhou District
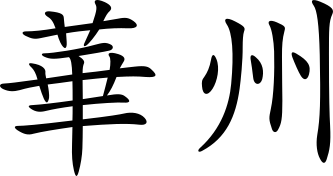
- "Huazhou" in Chinese characters
- Chinese: 華州
Transcriptions
Standard Mandarin
- Hanyu Pinyin: Huàzhōu

Huazhou District (simplified Chinese: 华州区; traditional Chinese: 華州區; pinyin: Huázhōu Qū), formerly Hua County or Huaxian (simplified Chinese: 华县; traditional Chinese: 華縣; pinyin: Huá Xiàn), is a district of Weinan, Shaanxi province, China. It was upgraded from a county to a district in 2015. The district spans an area of 1,127.9 square kilometres (435.5 mi^{2}), and has a population of about 324,300 as of 2012.

== History ==
During the Western Zhou period, the area belonged to the State of Zheng.

During the Spring and Autumn period, the State of Qin established Zheng County in the area of present-day Huazhou.

Zheng County was put under the jurisdiction of Hua Prefecture. Zheng County was later merged into Hua Prefecture. In 1913, Hua Prefecture was re-organized as Hua County.

On May 23, 1949, the area was taken by forces of the People's Liberation Army. In 1958, Hua County was placed under the jurisdiction of Weinan County, which soon became Weinan Prefecture in 1961, and was upgraded to a prefecture-level city in 1994.

In October 2015, Hua County was upgraded to Huazhou District.

== Geography ==
Huazhou District is located in the eastern Qin Mountains, along the southern banks of the Wei River. The district is home to a number of smaller rivers which flow into the Wei, including the Chishui River, the Yuxian River, and the Shidi River.

=== Climate ===
The average annual temperature in Huazhou District is 13.4 °C (56.1 °F), and the average annual precipitation in the district totals 586.1 millimetres (23.07 in).

Climate data for Huazhou District, elevation 342 m (1,122 ft), (1991–2020 normals)
Month	Jan	Feb	Mar	Apr	May	Jun	Jul	Aug	Sep	Oct	Nov	Dec	Year
Mean daily maximum °C (°F)	5.1 (41.2)	9.9 (49.8)	16.1 (61.0)	22.6 (72.7)	27.6 (81.7)	32.4 (90.3)	33.1 (91.6)	31.0 (87.8)	26.0 (78.8)	20.0 (68.0)	12.9 (55.2)	6.5 (43.7)	20.3 (68.5)
Daily mean °C (°F)	−1.0 (30.2)	3.1 (37.6)	8.9 (48.0)	15.1 (59.2)	20.2 (68.4)	25.4 (77.7)	27.1 (80.8)	25.1 (77.2)	20.0 (68.0)	13.8 (56.8)	6.6 (43.9)	0.5 (32.9)	13.7 (56.7)
Mean daily minimum °C (°F)	−5.3 (22.5)	−1.8 (28.8)	3.2 (37.8)	8.6 (47.5)	13.5 (56.3)	18.7 (65.7)	21.7 (71.1)	20.4 (68.7)	15.5 (59.9)	9.4 (48.9)	2.2 (36.0)	−3.7 (25.3)	8.5 (47.4)
Average precipitation mm (inches)	6.4 (0.25)	10.6 (0.42)	20.0 (0.79)	42.6 (1.68)	59.6 (2.35)	62.8 (2.47)	92.3 (3.63)	88.6 (3.49)	93.1 (3.67)	60.8 (2.39)	25.3 (1.00)	5.1 (0.20)	567.2 (22.34)
Average precipitation days (≥ 0.1 mm)	3.9	3.8	5.6	7.1	8.7	7.8	9.0	9.2	10.7	9.1	6.0	3.1	84
Average snowy days	3.8	2.8	1.0	0.1	0	0	0	0	0	0	1.1	2.5	11.3
Average relative humidity (%)	70	68	66	69	68	64	75	81	83	82	78	72	73
Mean monthly sunshine hours	123.8	130.5	166.3	192.7	211.5	206.7	213.7	185.8	135.2	121.2	110.7	121.4	1,919.5
Percentage possible sunshine	39	42	45	49	49	48	49	45	37	35	36	40	43
Source: China Meteorological Administration

== Administrative divisions ==
Huazhou District administers one subdistrict and nine towns.

The district's sole subdistrict is Huazhou Subdistrict.

The district's nine towns are Xinglin, Chishui, Gaotang, Daming, Guapo, Lianhuasi, Liuzhi, Xiamiao, and Jindui.

== Economy ==
Huazhou District has significant mineral deposits of molybdenum, gold, silver, iron, and granite.

== Transportation ==
National Highway 310 runs through the district, as does the Longhai railway.

== Notable people ==
- Guo Ziyi, Tang dynasty general
- Hu Lien, Chinese Nationalist general
- Shi Hengfeng, Chinese Nationalist general

== Attractions ==
- Weihua Uprising Site
