= Sanjia, Lianyuan =

Sanjia Township 三甲乡
- Township
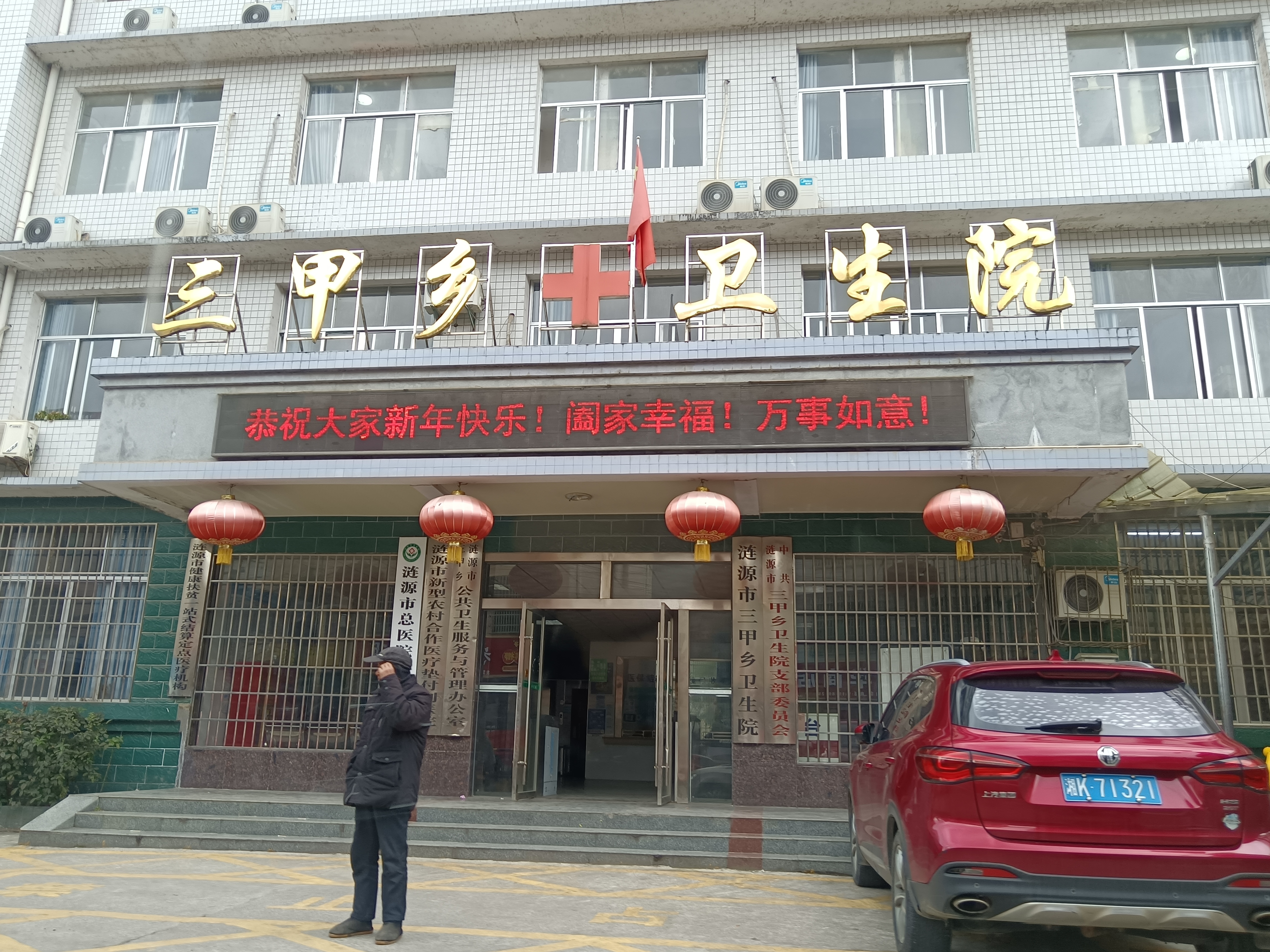

- Location in Hunan
- Coordinates: 27°39′29″N 111°38′31″E
- Country: People's Republic of China
- Province: Hunan
- Prefecture-level city: Loudi
- County-level city: Lianyuan

Area
  - Total: 83.4 km^{2} (32.2 sq mi)

Population
  - Total: 45,000
  - Density: 540/km^{2} (1,400/sq mi)
- Time zone: UTC+8 (China Standard)
- Area code: 0738

Sanjia Township (simplified Chinese: 三甲乡; traditional Chinese: 三甲鄉; pinyin: Sānjiǎ Xiāng) is a rural township in Lianyuan, Hunan Province, People's Republic of China.

== Administrative divisions ==
The township is divided into 36 villages: Dongshan Village, Yanmei Village, Baixi Village, Xiejia Village, Songbai Village, Caixi Village, Xiufeng Village, Luomajiang Village, Yangdong Village, Jinzhu Village, Dongxia Village, Zhuxin Village, Dongyan Village, Mabuqiao Village, Liuping Village, Tianjing Village, Moxi Village, Changjiang Village, Sanlian Village, Tongpen Village, Jianshanling Village, Shuzhushan Village, Meishuiling Village, Yangque Village, Tangjiayuan Village, Shetan Village, Heye Village, Shili Village, Zhangbai Village, Changrong Village, Erjia Village, Liujia Village, Sanjia Village, Xinwu Village, Yupin Village, and Yufeng Village (东山村、岩美村、白溪村、谢家村、松柏村、财溪村、秀峰村、落马江村、阳硐村、金竹村、硐下村、竹新村、硐岩村、马埠桥村、柳坪村、田井村、墨溪村、长江村、三联村、铜盆村、尖山岭村、实竹山村、湄水岭村、杨雀村、堂家园村、社坛村、荷叶村、十甲村、张白村、长荣村、二甲村、六甲村、三甲村、新屋村、玉屏村、玉峰村).
