= Gaotang, Shaanxi =

Gaotang 高塘镇
- Town
- Interactive map of Gaotang
- Coordinates: 34°24′23″N 109°39′19″E
- Country: People's Republic of China
- Province: Shaanxi
- Prefecture-level city: Weinan
- County: Hua
- Elevation: 585 m (1,919 ft)
- Time zone: UTC+8 (China Standard)

Gaotang (Chinese: 高塘; pinyin: Gāotáng) is a town of Hua County in eastern Shaanxi province, China, located about 17 kilometres (11 mi) southeast of downtown Weinan on the northern slopes of the Qin Mountains. As of 2011, it has 41 villages under its administration.
