= Anping, Lianyuan =

Anping 安平镇
- Town
- Location in Hunan
- Coordinates: 27°49′11″N 111°41′37″E
- Country: People's Republic of China
- Province: Hunan
- Prefecture-level city: Loudi
- County-level city: Lianyuan

Area
  - Total: 94.41 km^{2} (36.45 sq mi)

Population
  - Total: 40,867
  - Density: 432.9/km^{2} (1,121/sq mi)
- Time zone: UTC+8 (China Standard)
- Area code: 0738

Anping Town (simplified Chinese: 安平镇; traditional Chinese: 安平鎮; pinyin: Ānpíng Zhèn) is an urban town and subdivision of Lianyuan, Hunan Province, People's Republic of China.

== Administrative divisions ==
The town is divided into 53 villages and 1 community:

- Xiangzhong Community
- Hengyan Village
- Daqiu Village
- Tangwanli Village
- Tongshu Village
- Datangbian Village
- Yanxi Village
- Guichang Village
- Yuanxin Village
- Tianxin Village
- Jingkeng Village
- Liushi Village
- Jiangjiang Village
- Shuanglong Village
- Liangshui Village
- Daoshi Village
- Yankeng Village
- Dashiling Village
- Tongjia Village
- Changxi Village
- Hengtang Village
- Zhanglong Village
- Meijia Village
- Shuiping Village
- Shuangtang Village
- Shideng Village
- Shiniu Village
- Xinhe Village
- Guanyin Village
- Tongmiao Village
- Qingshan Village
- Baimao Village
- Tangjia Village
- Xinwan Village
- Mafangkou Village
- Jimu Village
- Meitang Village
- Yanxia Village
- Wanfang Village
- Luoke Village
- Luguan Village
- Qiangyuan Village
- Jiangxia Village
- Zhangshuping Village
- Sigu Village
- Liujia Village
- Tianchong Village
- Changxiao Village
- Chenfu Village
- Niulang Village
- Yangliutian Village
- Dacha Village
- Fengshan Village
- Fengjiashan Village
