= Shimashan =

Shimashan Town 石马山镇
- Town
- Location in Hunan
- Coordinates: 27°40′57″N 111°40′54″E
- Country: People's Republic of China
- Province: Hunan
- Prefecture-level city: Loudi
- County-level city: Lianyuan

Area
  - Total: 116.8 km^{2} (45.1 sq mi)

Population
  - Total: 72,000
  - Density: 620/km^{2} (1,600/sq mi)
- Time zone: UTC+8 (China Standard)
- Postal code: 417100
- Area code: 0738

Shimashan Town (simplified Chinese: 石马山镇; traditional Chinese: 石馬山鎮; pinyin: Shímǎshān Zhèn) is an urban town in Lianyuan, Loudi City, Hunan Province, People's Republic of China.

== Administrative divisions ==
The town is divided into 63 villages and 4 communities:

- Meiyuan Community
- Huangshan Community
- Shuanghe Community
- Hehua Community
- Wujiba Village
- Xinzhong Village
- Majiajing Village
- Shimei Village
- Qingyan Village
- Zhangjiawan Village
- Tangjiachong Village
- Xiaochong Village
- Qingtong Village
- Zihua Village
- Paizhou Village
- Paizhang Village
- Yangling Village
- Jingquan Village
- Xingfu Village
- Yuantou Village
- Shiqiao Village
- Peiyuan Village
- Bengshi Village
- Lijialong Village
- Jianguang Village
- Jifeng Village
- Longbu Village
- Manshui Village
- Fusheng Village
- Dafeng Village
- Leifeng Village
- Qunying Village
- Qunxiong Village
- Shimen Village
- Zhuquan Village
- Gutai Village
- Huquan Village
- Tuoping Village
- Longjiang Village
- Dongjia Village
- Huangli Village
- Xiangche Village
- Niaoxi Village
- Shantao Village
- Shuangli Village
- Guixin Village
- Guanqiao Village
- Chuanmen Village
- Muling Village
- Dongxuan Village
- Matoushan Village
- Feixian Village
- Shuangche Village
- Changche Village
- Maichong Village
- Wenjiang Village
- Yingshan Village
- Xinhe Village
- Tuanjie Village
- Nanmu Village
- Zixi Village
- Baiyang Village
- Zhizi Village
- Huilongjiang Village
- Sijia Village
- Qunxian Village
- Qunlian Village
