= Fengping, Lianyuan =

Fengping Town 枫坪镇
- Town
- Location in Hunan
- Coordinates: 27°38′10″N 111°47′18″E
- Country: People's Republic of China
- Province: Hunan
- Prefecture-level city: Loudi
- County-level city: Lianyuan

Area
  - Total: 41.79 km^{2} (16.14 sq mi)

Population
  - Total: 27,900
  - Density: 668/km^{2} (1,730/sq mi)
- Time zone: UTC+8 (China Standard)
- Postal code: 417100
- Area code: 0738

Fengping Town (simplified Chinese: 枫坪镇; traditional Chinese: 楓坪鎮; pinyin: Fēngpíng Zhèn) is an urban town in and subdivision of Lianyuan, Hunan Province, People's Republic of China.

== Administrative divisions ==
The town administers 1 residential community and 24 villages: Fengxing Community, Yangzi Village, Niujiaochong Village, Hejiang Village, Siliang Village, Mingxing Village, Guanshan Village, Qingshu Village, Xiaojiayuan Village, Longshi Village, Fenshui'ao Village, Baishi Village, Baishu Village, Huangtan Village, Huaqiao Village, Fengshu Village, Sanjiao Village, Hongshuiling Village, Tanping Village, Qiushu Village, Zhangjialong Village, Baishuilong Village, Huilong'ao Village, Fengping Village, and Jinjia Village (枫星社区、杨梓村、牛角冲村、荷将村、四良村、明星村、观山村、青树村、肖家园村、龙狮村、分水坳村、白石村、柏树村、黄潭村、花桥村、枫树村、三角村、洪水岭村、坦坪村、球树村、张家垅村、白水垅村、回垅坳村、枫坪村、金家村).
