= Shi Yinshun =

Chinese Buddhist monk (born 1974)

- 释印顺
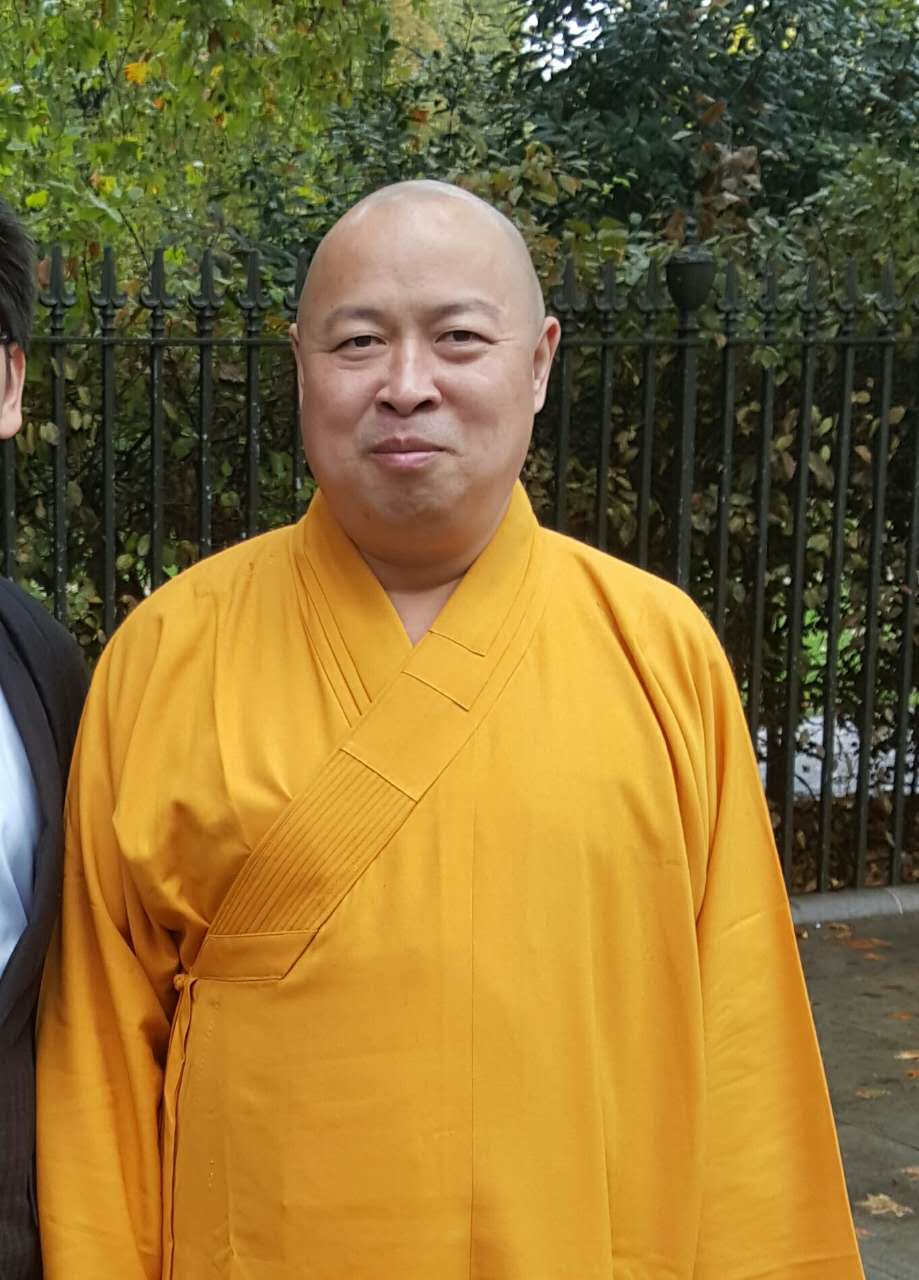
- Shi Yinshun in March 2016.
- Title: Vice President of the Buddhist Association of China

Personal life
- Born: 1974 (age 51–52) Xiangfan, Hubei, China
- Education: Peking University

Religious life
- Religion: Chan Buddhism
- School: Linji school
- Lineage: 45th generation
- Dharma name: Yinshun (印顺)

Senior posting
- Teacher: Benhuan

Shi Yinshun (simplified Chinese: 释印顺; traditional Chinese: 釋印順; pinyin: Shì Yìnshùn; born 1974), courtesy name Yuanli (源利), is a Chinese Buddhist monk, Chan master and religious leader who serves as vice president of the Buddhist Association of China. Shi being short for fashih: dharmaperson. He held several abbatial posts, such as abbot of the Hongfa Temple, Zhonghua Temple, and Nanshan Temple. He is also the rector of Nanhai Buddhist Academy.

== Biography ==
Born in Xiangyang, Hubei in 1970 to a family of teachers, he graduated from the Department of Philosophy, Peking University. His mother died when he was six and then he was raised by his stepmother. He completed his doctor's degree in Buddhism from Chulalongkorn University.

In 2000 he received ordination as a monk under his teacher Benhuan, who was the 44th generation of Linji school.

In 2001 he became the abbot of Zhonghua Temple. On October 18, 2008, he became the abbot of Hongfa Temple, replacing Benhuan. On December 5, 2011, King of Thailand Bhumibol Adulyadej bestowed on him the title of "Maha Nayaka" (华僧大尊长) or Great Leader.

Buddhist titles
Preceded by Benhuan	2nd Abbot of the Hongfa Temple; 2008–	Incumbent
