= Liumutang =

Liumutang Town 六亩塘镇
- Town
- Location in Hunan
- Coordinates: 27°41′29″N 111°38′54″E
- Country: People's Republic of China
- Province: Hunan
- Prefecture-level city: Loudi
- County-level city: Lianyuan

Area
  - Total: 70 km^{2} (27 sq mi)

Population
  - Total: 56,000
  - Density: 800/km^{2} (2,100/sq mi)
- Time zone: UTC+8 (China Standard)
- Area code: 0738

Liumutang Town (simplified Chinese: 六亩塘镇; traditional Chinese: 六亩塘鎮; pinyin: Liùmǔtáng Zhèn) is an urban town in and subdivision of Lianyuan, Hunan Province, People's Republic of China.

== Administrative divisions ==
The town is divided into 31 villages and 5 communities: Niujiashi Community, Shizishan Community, Lumaotang Community, Duqingtang Community, Lianshuimingcheng Community, Sanbuqiao Village, Wentian Village, Maoping Village, Shitou Village, Dongtingqiao Village, Shuting Village, Tongchewan Village, Shuting Village, Tongchewan Village, Xiuxi Village, Jingjia Village, Liangxi Village, Shengli Village, Jindi Village, Jiebian Village, Tongyi Village, Xingfu Village, Xinkang Village, Pingshang Village, Jingqiao Village, Hongguang Village, Meinan Village, Furong Village, Huanglong Village, Tongjiajing Village, Luanfeng Village, Shuangshi Village, Yanzhu Village, Yachong Village, Waqiu Village, Limin Village, Baishixi Village, and Fuke Village (牛角石社区、狮子山社区、芦茅塘社区、笃庆堂社区、涟水名城社区、三步桥村、温田村、毛坪村、石头村、洞庭桥村、树亭村、桐车湾村、秀溪村、井家村、良溪村、胜利村、锦地村、界边村、同意村、兴福村、新康村、坪上村、荆桥村、红光村、梅南村、芙蓉村、黄龙村、同家井村、峦峰村、双石村、烟竹村、湴冲村、瓦坵村、利民村、白石溪村、扶珂村).
