= Qixingjie =

Qixingjie Town 七星街镇
- Town
- Location in Hunan
- Coordinates: 27°54′15″N 111°51′15″E
- Country: People's Republic of China
- Province: Hunan
- Prefecture-level city: Loudi
- County-level city: Lianyuan

Area
  - Total: 174 km^{2} (67 sq mi)

Population
  - Total: 80,000
  - Density: 460/km^{2} (1,200/sq mi)
- Time zone: UTC+8 (China Standard)
- Postal code: 417100
- Area code: 0738

Qixingjie Town (simplified Chinese: 七星街镇; traditional Chinese: 七星街鎮; pinyin: Qīxīngjiē Zhèn) is an urban town in Lianyuan, Hunan Province, People's Republic of China.

== Administrative divisions ==
The town is divided into 58 villages and 2 communities:

- Qihu Community
- Hongyuan Community
- Qixing Village
- Tongfang Village
- Honglian Village
- Fuli Village
- Baiyao Village
- Fuxing Village
- Ganxi Village
- Hongqi Village
- Xiashan Village
- Xinmin Village
- Yanjing Village
- Xianshan Village
- Xianglushan Village
- Heishuitang Village
- Luobodang Village
- Dongtang Village
- Jinjing Village
- Laotang Village
- Longgui Village
- Longju Village
- Hongxian Village
- Lixi Village
- Huxi Village
- Shixi Village
- Tielu Village
- Tanshan Village
- Yanzhu Village
- Shizhu Village
- Xiangbo Village
- Sanjiao Village
- Wujia Village
- Qingming Village
- Tongxin Village
- Quxi Village
- Lanma Village
- Hengjie Village
- Rucao Village
- Ruguang Village
- Yatang Village
- Gaoyan Village
- Huangzhu Village
- Baiyang Village
- Tianhu Village
- Ganzhuang Village
- Damu Village
- Dongyuan Village
- Xiandong Village
- Zengjia Village
- Chahua Village
- Dongyan Village
- Caihua Village
- Tuzhu Village
- Zhengli Village
- Lixi Village
- Lishu Village
- Leiming Village
- Nan'an Village
- Chaoguang Village
