= Hua Prefecture (Guangdong) =

Prefecture in imperial China

Hua Prefecture (化州)
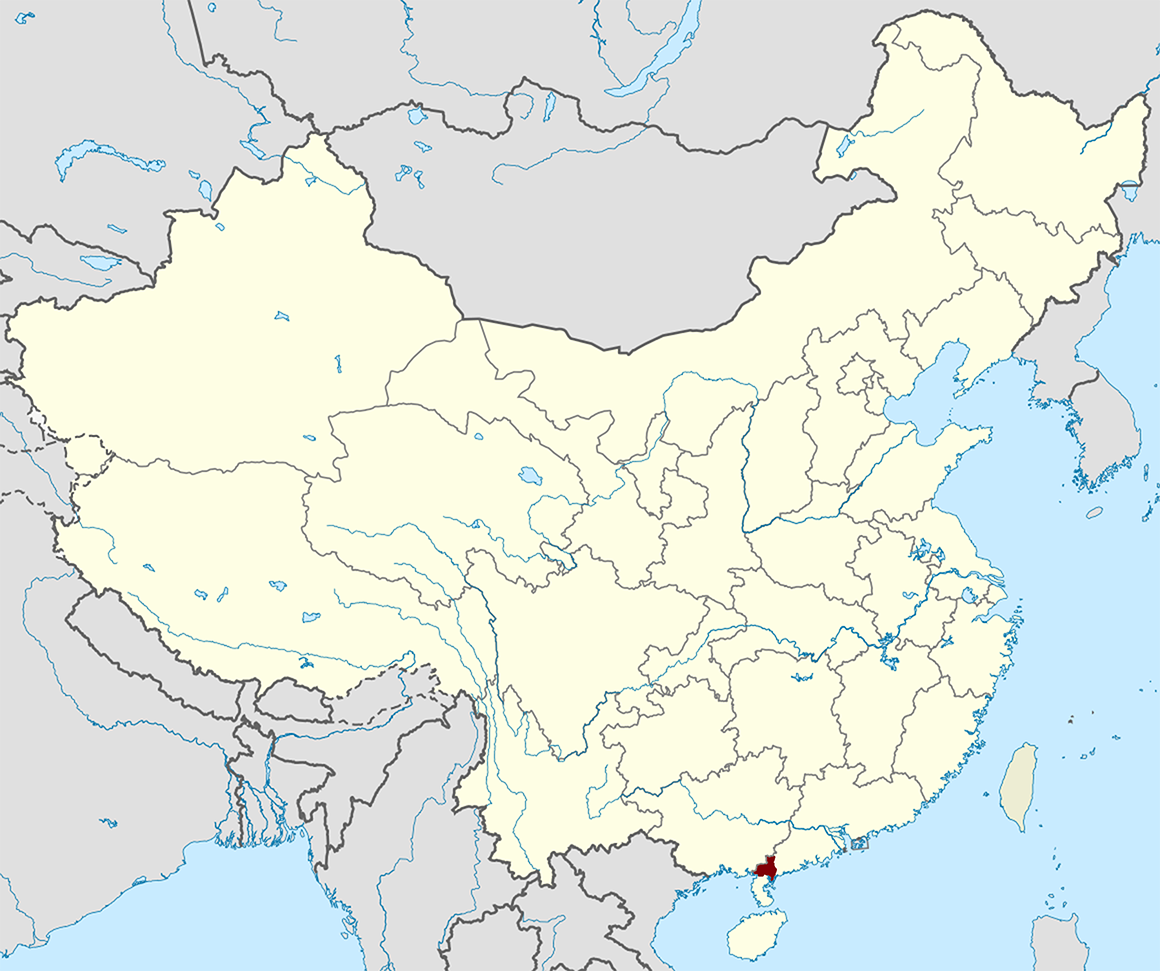
- Population
  - 1070s or 1080s: Unknown, 9,373 households
- History
  - Preceded by: Bian Prefecture (辯州)
  - Created: 980 (Song dynasty)
  - Abolished: 1912 (R.O. China)
  - Succeeded by: Hua County, Guangdong
- Contained within
  - Circuit: Guangnan Circuit; Guangnan West Circuit

Hua Prefecture
- Chinese: 化州
Transcriptions
Standard Mandarin
- Hanyu Pinyin: Huà Zhōu

Huazhou or Hua Prefecture was a zhou (prefecture) in imperial China in modern southwestern Guangdong, China. It existed from 980 to 1912.

The modern county-level city Huazhou, Guangdong retains its name.

== Counties ==
Hua Prefecture administered the following counties (縣) during the Song dynasty:

1. Shilong (石龍), modern Huazhou, Guangdong.
2. Wuchuan (吳川), modern Wuchuan, Guangdong.
3. Shicheng (石城), modern Lianjiang, Guangdong.
