= Meijiang, Lianyuan =

Meijiang Town 湄江镇
- Town
- Location in Hunan
- Coordinates: 27°51′52″N 111°47′03″E
- Country: People's Republic of China
- Province: Hunan
- Prefecture-level city: Loudi
- County-level city: Lianyuan

Area
  - Total: 138 km^{2} (53 sq mi)

Population
  - Total: 50,000
  - Density: 360/km^{2} (940/sq mi)
- Time zone: UTC+8 (China Standard)
- Area code: 0738

Meijiang Town (simplified Chinese: 湄江镇; traditional Chinese: 湄江鎮; pinyin: Méijiāng Zhèn) is an urban town in Lianyuan, Hunan Province, People's Republic of China.

== Administrative divisions ==
The town is divided into 45 villages and 1 community: Lishan Community, Sijiu Village, Heping Village, Xiaojia Village, Xianfeng Village, Zhengqi Village, Paimen Village, Lishan Village, Shiniu Village, Yiling Village, Baishi Village, Zhenzhu Village, Changqiao Village, Longtang Village, Sifang Village, Dongting Village, Sujia Village, Yuanjia Village, Meijiang Village, Saihai Village, Yuanli Village, Wujia Village, Houxi Village, Meitang Village, Xiantou Village, Shitao Village, Changchun Village, Xianglan Village, Paoma Village, Haozi Village, Huangluo Village, Zhuyan Village, Longquan Village, Shenkeng Village, Tanmu Village, Nanzhu Village, Tuolin Village, Fengjia Village, Yantang Village, Zhaibei Village, Yatian Village, Taoxi Village, Xiujia Village, Wangjiang Village, Xinjiang Village, and Mafangxi Village (栗山社区、思久村、和平村、肖家村、仙峰村、正旗村、排门村、栗山村、石牛村、衣岭村、白石村、珍珠村、长桥村、龙塘村、四房村、洞庭村、苏家村、袁家村、湄江村、塞海村、远利村、吴家村、后溪村、湄塘村、枧头村、石陶村、长春村、香兰村、跑马村、蒿子村、黄罗村、朱岩村、龙泉村、深坑村、檀木村、楠竹村、托林村、凤家村、滟塘村、寨背村、湴田村、桃溪村、秀加村、王江村、新江村、马方溪村).
