= Huazhou Subdistrict, Weinan =

Huazhou Subdistrict 华洲街道
- Subdistrict
- Location of Huazhou Subdistrict in China
- Coordinates: 34.5112°N 109.7532°E
- Country: China
- Province: Shaanxi
- Prefecture-level city: Weinan
- District: Huazhou District

Huazhou Subdistrict (simplified Chinese: 华州街道; traditional Chinese: 華州街道; pinyin: Huázhōu Jiēdào) is a subdistrict in Huazhou District, Weinan, Shaanxi, China.

== History ==
In June 2015, the Shaanxi provincial government upgraded Huazhou from a town to a subdistrict.

== Administrative divisions ==
Huazhou Subdistrict is divided into five residential communities and eight administrative villages.

=== Residential communities ===
The subdistrict's five residential communities are as follows:

- Xiguan Community (Chinese: 西关社区)
- Dajie Community (Chinese: 大街社区)
- Wujia Community (Chinese: 吴家社区)
- Dianli Community (Chinese: 电力社区)
- Hongling Community (Chinese: 红岭社区)

=== Villages ===
The subdistrict's eight administrative villages are as follows:

- Tiema Village (Chinese: 铁马村)
- Xiguan Village (Chinese: 西关村)
- Chengnei Village (Chinese: 城内村)
- Wujia Village (Chinese: 吴家村)
- Tuanjie Village (Chinese: 团结村)
- Linwang Village (Chinese: 吝王村)
- Wangshizi Village (Chinese: 王什字村)
- Xiannong Village (Chinese: 先农村)
