= Jiantan (disambiguation) =

Jiantan may refer to:

- Jiantan metro station, a metro station of the Taipei Metro
- Jiantan Mountain (劍潭山)
- Jiantan Park
- Jiantan River
- Jiantan Road
- Jiantan Temple
- Jiantan Town (碱滩镇), Ganzhou District, prefecture-level city of Zhangye, Gansu Province, China
- Jiantan Village
  - Jiantan Village (枧潭村), a village in Gaoqiao Town, Cili County, Hunan Province, China
  - Jiantan Village (碱滩村), a village in Shacheng town, administration of Zhangjiakou, Hebei province, China

== See also ==
- Jian Tan, a Buddhist monk
