= Erdu Township =

Township of Shimen County, Hunan, China

Coordinates: 29°34′39.0″N 111°26′7.8″E

Erdu Township (Chinese: 二都乡; pinyin: èrdū Xiāng) is a township of Shimen County in Hunan, China. The township is located in the southwestern Shimen County. It is bordered by Xinguan (Chinese: 新关镇), Chujiang and Yijiadu (Chinese: 易家渡镇) towns to the north, Linli County to the east, Jiashan Town (Chinese: 夹山镇) to the south, and Miaoshi Town of Cili County to the west. The township has an area of 70.5 km^{2} (27.2 sq mi) with a population of 27,770 (as of 2010 census).

== History ==
Tujia people inhabited the land in pre-Ming times, it was a separate regime roled by Tusi in Yuan dynasty. In 1369, the Tusi surrendered to the Ming dynasty. Han immigrant increased after Tusi's surrender, a conflict broke out between Ming government and Tusi in 1390, with his tribe, the Tusi was forced to transfer to the Western Hunan. Erdu Township was formed in 1956, reorganized as a commune, and reformed as a township in 1984.
