= Lingyang =

Língyáng may refer to the following locations in China:

- Lingyang, Qingyang County, town in southern Anhui
- Lingyang, Linzhou, town in Linzhou, Henan
- Lingyang, Ju County, town in Ju County, Shandong
- Lingyang, Cili (零阳镇), a town of Cili County, Hunan Province.
