= Zhuangta, Cili =

Zhuangta Township
- Township

Chinese transcription(s)
  - Simplified: 庄塌乡
  - Traditional: 莊塌鄉
  - Pinyin: Zhuangta Xiang
- Location in China
- Coordinates: 29°37′52″N 110°54′10″E
- Country: People's Republic of China
- Province: Hunan
- City: Zhangjiajie
- County: Cili County

Area
  - Total: 55.87 km^{2} (21.57 sq mi)

Population
  - Total: 6,650
  - Density: 119/km^{2} (308/sq mi)
- Time zone: UTC+8 (China Standard)
- Area code: 0744

Zhuangta Township (simplified Chinese: 庄塌乡; traditional Chinese: 莊塌鄉; pinyin: Zhuangta Xiang) is a rural township in Cili County, Zhangjiajie, Hunan Province, People's Republic of China.

== Administrative divisions ==
The township is divided into 12 villages and 1 community, which include the following areas: Xizhuang Community, Xingdou Village, Zhuangta Village, Sanchaxi Village, Yueyan Village, Xinche Village, Shuitian Village, Xiaota Village, Fengping Village, Heicong Village, Maota Village, Longdeng Village, and Shuiku Village (西庄社区、星斗村、庄塔村、三岔溪村、月岩村、新车村、水田村、肖塔村、枫坪村、黑丛村、毛塔村、龙灯村、水库村).
