= Jinglongqiao =

Jinglongqiao Township
- Township

Chinese transcription(s)
  - Simplified: 景龙桥乡
  - Traditional: 景龍橋鄉
  - Pinyin: Jinglongqiao Xiang
- Location in China
- Coordinates: 29°18′15″N 111°05′44″E
- Country: People's Republic of China
- Province: Hunan
- City: Zhangjiajie
- County: Cili County

Area
  - Total: 88 km^{2} (34 sq mi)

Population
  - Total: 10,600
  - Density: 120/km^{2} (310/sq mi)
- Time zone: UTC+8 (China Standard)
- Area code: 0744

Jinglongqiao Township (simplified Chinese: 景龙桥乡; traditional Chinese: 景龍橋鄉; pinyin: Jinglongqiao Xiang) is a rural township in Cili County, Zhangjiajie, Hunan Province, People's Republic of China.

== Administrative divisions ==
The township is divided into 12 villages, which include the following areas: Jinglongqiao Village, Babuqiao Village, Tongzixiang Village, Daqing Village, Lianhe Village, Yangjiaya Village, Erxi Village, Xinfeng Village, Qingquan Village, Jingquan Village, Taiping Village, and Daxi Village (景龙桥村、八步桥村、桐子巷村、大清村、联合村、杨家垭村、二溪村、新丰村、清泉村、景泉村、太坪村、大溪村).
