= Jinping, Cili =

Jinping Township
- Township

Chinese transcription(s)
  - Simplified: 金坪乡
  - Traditional: 金坪鄉
  - Pinyin: Jinping Xiang
- Location in China
- Coordinates: 29°14′50″N 110°57′28″E
- Country: People's Republic of China
- Province: Hunan
- City: Zhangjiajie
- County: Cili County

Area
  - Total: 94.7 km^{2} (36.6 sq mi)

Population
  - Total: 8,300
  - Density: 88/km^{2} (230/sq mi)
- Time zone: UTC+8 (China Standard)
- Postal code: 427229
- Area code: 0744

Jinping Township (simplified Chinese: 金坪乡; traditional Chinese: 金坪鄉; pinyin: Jinping Xiang) is a rural township in Cili County, Zhangjiajie, Hunan Province, People's Republic of China.

== Administrative divisions ==
The township is divided into 15 villages, which include the following areas: Jinping Village, Longxi Village, Congmu Village, Tangxi Village, Youfu Village, Jinfu Village, Lianping Village, Yunchao Village, Qingliang Village, Jinchang Village, Huashan Village, Fushan Village, Qurong Village, Fulong Village, and Ximao Village (金坪村、龙溪村、丛木村、汤溪村、优富村、金富村、联坪村、云朝村、清凉村、金长村、华山村、福山村、渠溶村、福龙村、细毛村).
