= Jian Xianfo =

Chinese politician (1915–2022)

- 蹇先佛
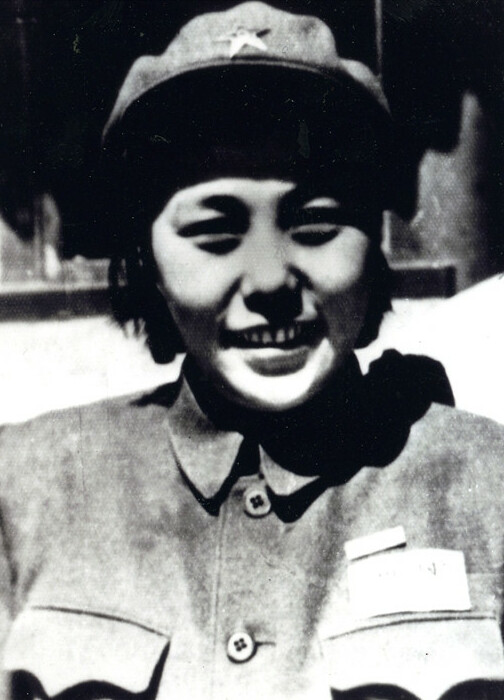

Member of the National People's Congress (3rd)
- In office December 1964 – January 1975

Personal details
- Born: July 1915 Cili County, Hunan, Republic of China
- Died: 30 December 2022 (aged 107)
- Spouse: Xiao Ke (m. 1935–2008)
- Children: 1
- Occupation: Politician

Jian Xianfo (Chinese: 蹇先佛; pinyin: Jiǎn Xiānfó; July 1915 – 30 December 2022) was a Chinese communist politician. She joined the Chinese Red Army in 1934 and married one of its generals, Xiao Ke. Jian accompanied Xiao on the Long March, giving birth to their son en route. After the communist victory in the Chinese Civil War, she served in the Ministry of the Electric Industry as cadre and then vice-minister. She was also an assistant to senior party member Qiao Shi.

== Early life ==
Jian Xianfo was born in Cili County, Hunan, in 1915. Her brother was active in the Chinese communist movement and inspired Jian's sister Jian Xianren, who was seven years her elder, in its ideology. In 1927, Jian Xianren was wanted by the Nationalist police and left home to join her brother in the Chinese Red Army, who was fighting in the Chinese Civil War. Jian's remaining family members were harassed by the Nationalists and her father arrested (and later released after a fee was paid). At age 16, Jian was sent to the Women's Normal School at Changsha to escape the harassment.

After the 18 September 1931 Mukden Incident, Jian decided that the Nationalists had failed to stand up to the Japanese invaders and decided to join the Red Army at the first opportunity. She joined the 2nd Route Army when guerrillas from that force came to her town in December 1934. Her younger brother, who was then 15, also joined at this time. For the next two years, Jian worked as a propagandist with the 6th Army Group and the 2nd Red Front Army, specialising in illustrations. She married General Xiao Ke, commander of the 6th Army Group.

== Long March ==
With Nationalist forces gaining the upper hand in the war, communist forces began a series of retreats that became known as the Long March. Jian accompanied Xiao and the army on the retreat, which began at Sangzhi. Though she did not know it, she was pregnant when she started the march. Jian's sister had married General He Long, commander of the 2nd Army Group, which joined the 6th on the march. The sisters were among a group of only 25 women to march with the armies. Jian Xianren was unable to find a family to take in her baby daughter so she had to bring her along on the march.

Jian climbed glacial mountains on the march during the third trimester of her pregnancy. Her water broke while marching through the grasslands of Sichuan, though she did not initially notice. Her husband and sister assisted her to take shelter in an earthwork by the side of the road where she gave birth to a son on a pile of cloth bundles. It proved to be a difficult birth and mother and child were soaked by a rainstorm. However, both survived and Jian named her son Baosheng, meaning "born in a fort". Jian was carried on a stretcher by four soldiers for the next three days of the march.

== Later career ==
The war ended in 1949 with a victory for the communists in mainland China. Jian joined the Ministry of the Electric Industry in 1979 serving as the Vice-Minister until March 1982. Between September 1982 and November 1987, during the 12th Central Committee of the Chinese Communist Party, she was a member of the Central Commission for Discipline Inspection. At other points Jian served as an assistant to senior party member Qiao Shi and as deputy director of the Central Organisation Department.

== Death ==
Jian Xianfo died due to a lung infection and COVID-19 on 30 December 2022, at age 107.
