= Guotaiqiao =

Guotaiqiao Township
- Township

Chinese transcription(s)
  - Simplified: 国太桥乡
  - Traditional: 國太橋鄉
  - Pinyin: Guotaiqiao Xiang
- Location in China
- Coordinates: 29°38′56″N 110°59′13″E
- Country: People's Republic of China
- Province: Hunan
- City: Zhangjiajie
- County: Cili County

Area
  - Total: 57.62 km^{2} (22.25 sq mi)

Population
  - Total: 8,392
  - Density: 145.6/km^{2} (377.2/sq mi)
- Time zone: UTC+8 (China Standard)
- Area code: 0744

Guotaiqiao Township (simplified Chinese: 国太桥乡; traditional Chinese: 國太橋鄉; pinyin: Guotaiqiao Xiang) is a rural township in Cili County, Zhangjiajie, Hunan Province, People's Republic of China.

== Administrative divisions ==
The township is divided into 10 villages and 1 community, which include the following areas: Guotaiqiao Community, Xingming Village, Linkuang Village, Guangkou Village, Leiyan Village, Shuanghe Village, Daojie Village, Yangping Village, Baihe Village, Fenghe Village, and Xinyuan Village (国太桥社区、星明村、磷矿村、广口村、雷岩村、双合村、道街村、杨坪村、白鹤村、凤鹤村、新源村).
