= Zhaojiagang =

Zhaojiagang Township 赵家岗土家族乡
- Township
- Location in Hunan
- Coordinates: 29°29′42″N 110°40′43″E
- Country: People's Republic of China
- Province: Hunan
- Prefecture-level city: Zhangjiajie
- County: Cili

Area
  - Total: 73.13 km^{2} (28.24 sq mi)

Population
  - Total: 14,660
  - Density: 200.5/km^{2} (519.2/sq mi)
- Time zone: UTC+8 (China Standard)
- Area code: 0744

Zhaojiagang Township (simplified Chinese: 赵家岗土家族乡; traditional Chinese: 趙家崗土家族鄉; pinyin: Zhàojiāgǎng Tǔjiāzú Xiāng) is a rural township in Cili County, Hunan Province, People's Republic of China.

== Administrative divisions ==
The township is divided into 19 villages, which include the following areas: Shuanghe Village, Heping Village, Chang'an Village, Xinhe Village, Xinping Village, Dayong Village, Guangya Village, Yuping Village, Tian'e Village, Mashan Village, Zhumugang Village, Jinping Village, Xinquan Village, Xinzhuang Village, Xin'an Village, Wantian Village, Xinqiao Village, Tianshan Village, and Xinyu Village (双河村、和坪村、长安村、新合村、新坪村、大庸村、广垭村、于坪村、天娥村、麻山村、株木岗村、金坪村、新泉村、新庄村、新安村、碗田村、新桥村、天山村、新峪村).
