= Yanbodu =

Yanbodu Town 岩泊渡镇
- Town
- Location in Hunan
- Coordinates: 29°22′42″N 110°58′16″E
- Country: People's Republic of China
- Province: Hunan
- Prefecture-level city: Zhangjiajie
- County: Cili

Area
  - Total: 93.86 km^{2} (36.24 sq mi)

Population
  - Total: 26,800
  - Density: 286/km^{2} (740/sq mi)
- Time zone: UTC+8 (China Standard)
- Area code: 0744

Yanbodu Town (simplified Chinese: 岩泊渡镇; traditional Chinese: 巖泊渡鎮; pinyin: Yánbódù Zhèn) is an urban town in Cili County, Hunan Province, People's Republic of China.

== Administrative divisions ==
The town is divided into 26 villages and 1 community:

- Hangxi Village (行溪村)
- Liaojia Village (廖家村)
- Shuangqiao Village (双桥村)
- Da'an Village (大安村)
- Yamao Village (鸭毛村)
- Shuangxi Village (双溪村)
- Yangu Village (岩谷村)
- Wanjia Village (万家村)
- Tianping Village (田坪村)
- Gongshi Village (贡市村)
- Sanwan Village (三湾村)
- Shima Village (失马村)
- Hongyan Village (红岩村)
- Magongdu Village (马公渡村)
- Heping Village (和平村)
- Wuyin Village (五音村)
- Liangshan Village (两山村)
- Shiyan Village (狮岩村)
- Baiyangdang Village (白洋档村)
- Shuangge Village (双鸽村)
- Longtan Village (龙潭村)
- Jizhong Village (集中村)
- Tianyu Village (田峪村)
- Hongtu Village (红土村)
- Xingming Village (星明村)
- Yanshi Village (岩市村)
- Yanbodu Community (岩泊渡社区)
