= Yangliupu =

Yangliupu Township 杨柳铺乡
- Township
- Location in Hunan
- Coordinates: 29°34′01″N 111°07′41″E
- Country: People's Republic of China
- Province: Hunan
- Prefecture-level city: Zhangjiajie
- County: Cili

Area
  - Total: 108 km^{2} (42 sq mi)

Population
  - Total: 23,000
  - Density: 210/km^{2} (550/sq mi)
- Time zone: UTC+8 (China Standard)
- Area code: 0744

Yangliupu Township (simplified Chinese: 杨柳铺乡; traditional Chinese: 楊柳鋪鄉; pinyin: Yángliǔpū Xiāng) is a rural township in Cili County, Hunan Province, People's Republic of China.

== Administrative divisions ==
The township is divided into 23 villages and 2 communities, which include the following areas: Yangliupu Community, Yangxi Community, Chaxi Village, Siqiao Village, Xinpu Village, Fuxing Village, Sanhe Village, Xiaokeng Village, Lashu Village, Changwan Village, Kangzhuang Village, Zhongxi Village, Longyue Village, Yongsheng Village, Heye Village, Baojing Village, Xiangyu Village, Nanshan Village, Heyu Village, Shenping Village, Zhongguang Village, Huayue Village, Pingfeng Village, Yuanyang Village, and Jianzhuang Village (杨柳铺社区、杨溪社区、岔溪村、四桥村、新铺村、复兴村、三合村、小坑村、腊树村、长湾村、康庄村、中溪村、龙跃村、永圣村、荷叶村、宝景村、向峪村、南山村、荷峪村、申坪村、中广村、华岳村、坪峰村、鸳鸯村、俭庄村).
