= Xikou, Cili =

Xikou Town 溪口镇
- Town
- Location in Hunan
- Coordinates: 29°13′51″N 110°45′02″E
- Country: People's Republic of China
- Province: Hunan
- Prefecture-level city: Zhangjiajie
- County: Cili

Population
  - Total: 17,500
- Time zone: UTC+8 (China Standard)
- Area code: 0744

Xikou Town (simplified Chinese: 溪口镇; traditional Chinese: 溪口鎮; pinyin: Xīkǒu Zhèn) is an urban town in Cili County, Hunan Province, People's Republic of China.

== Administrative divisions ==
The town is divided into 19 villages and 2 communities, which include the following areas: Xinjie Community, Laojie Community, Changtan Village, Pingtan Village, Wangjiaping Village, Duping Village, Tianqiao Village, Zhuojiashan Village, Huou Village, Baiyan Village, Dingzhu Village, He'ai Village, Liren Village, Ligong Village, Maopo Village, Tongmeng Village, Shuangyu Village, Gangtou Village, Yungui Village, Yanmen Village, and Dutan Village (新街社区、老街社区、长潭村、坪坦村、王家坪村、杜坪村、天桥村、卓家山村、湖凹村、白岩村、丁竹村、和爱村、里仁村、立功村、茅坡村、同盟村、双峪村、岗头村、云桂村、岩门村、渡坦村).
