= Dongyueguan =

Dongyueguan Town 东岳观镇
- Town
- Location in Hunan
- Coordinates: 29°33′43″N 111°02′06″E
- Country: People's Republic of China
- Province: Hunan
- Prefecture-level city: Zhangjiajie
- County: Cili County

Area
  - Total: 108 km^{2} (42 sq mi)

Population
  - Total: 29,500
  - Density: 273/km^{2} (707/sq mi)
- Time zone: UTC+8 (China Standard)
- Area code: 0744

Dongyueguan Town (simplified Chinese: 东岳观镇; traditional Chinese: 東嶽觀鎮; pinyin: Dōngyuèguàn Zhèn) is an urban town in and a subdivision of Cili County, Hunan Province, People's Republic of China.

== Administrative divisions ==
The town is divided into 25 villages and 1 community, which include the following areas: Dongshi Community, Tian'echi Village, Nanjia Village, Jiangxi Village, Caiqiu Village, Yinquan Village, Paoma Village, Banqiao Village, Sancha Village, Liangshui Village, Dangfeng Village, Fojiashan Village, Yangfengping Village, Dayan Village, Fengzidong Village, Fenshui Village, Beiping Village, Changchong Village, Xinhua Village, Guangdong Village, Sanqiao Village, Xibianyu Village, Guanjiayu Village, Dingta Village, Douya Village, and Douxi Village (东市社区、天鹅池村、南家村、江西村、彩球村、银泉村、跑马村、板桥村、三岔村、凉水村、当风村、佛袈山村、阳风坪村、大岩村、风自洞村、分水村、北坪村、长冲村、新花村、广东村、三桥村、西边峪村、管家峪村、丁塔村、斗垭村、陡溪村).
