= Nanshanping =

Nanshanping Township 南山坪乡
- Township
- Location in Hunan
- Coordinates: 29°19′20″N 110°53′26″E
- Country: People's Republic of China
- Province: Hunan
- Prefecture-level city: Zhangjiajie
- County: Cili

Population
  - Total: 11,860
- Time zone: UTC+8 (China Standard)
- Area code: 0744

Nanshanping Township (simplified Chinese: 南山坪乡; traditional Chinese: 南山坪鄉; pinyin: Nánshānpíng Xiāng) is a rural township in Cili County, Hunan Province, People's Republic of China.

== Administrative divisions ==
The township is divided into 17 villages, which include the following areas: Nanshan Village, Guangyang Village, Liangshan Village, Shawan Village, Shuanghu Village, Yanjing Village, Yanshi Village, Baima Village, Datian Village, Shuanghequan Village, Dasha Village, Baiguo Village, Xiniu Village, Zhongshan Village, Xinping Village, Fengshu Village, and Tianya Village (南山村、广阳村、梁山村、沙湾村、双湖村、盐井村、盐市村、白马村、大田村、双合泉村、大沙村、白果村、犀牛村、中山村、新坪村、枫树村、田垭村).
