= Jinyan, Cili =

Jinyan Township 金岩土家族乡
- Township
- Location in Hunan
- Coordinates: 29°10′28″N 110°40′47″E
- Country: People's Republic of China
- Province: Hunan
- Prefecture-level city: Zhangjiajie
- County: Cili County

Area
  - Total: 135.18 km^{2} (52.19 sq mi)

Population
  - Total: 18,000
  - Density: 130/km^{2} (340/sq mi)
- Time zone: UTC+8 (China Standard)
- Area code: 0744

Jinyan Township (simplified Chinese: 金岩土家族乡; traditional Chinese: 金巖土家族鄉; pinyin: Jīnyán Tǔjiāzú Xiāng) is a rural township in Cili County, Hunan Province, People's Republic of China.

== Administrative divisions ==
The township is divided into 19 villages, which include the following areas: Sanyuan Village, Luoyuan Village, Honglian Village, Yuetan Village, Baojian Village, Zhongping Village, Tuxi Village, Liuping Village, Chaping Village, Huping Village, Zhengping Village, Luofeng Village, Jinji Village, Jinpen Village, Nanyue Village, Nanping Village, Shuangzhong Village, Jinlong Village, and Minjia Village (三元村、落元村、红联村、月潭村、保健村、中坪村、土溪村、刘坪村、茶坪村、湖坪村、郑坪村、落丰村、金鸡村、金盆村、南岳村、南坪村、双中村、金龙村、敏家村).
