= Huping Mountain =

Mountain in Hunan, China

- Location within Hunan

Highest point
- Elevation: 2,098.7-metre (6,885 ft)
- Coordinates: 30°00′34″N 110°40′36″E

Naming
- Native name: 壶瓶山 (Chinese)

Geography
- Location: Shimen County, Hunan, China

Huping Mountain (simplified Chinese: 壶瓶山; traditional Chinese: 壺瓶山; pinyin: Húpíng Shān) is located in Shimen County, Hunan, China. It is the boundary mountain between Hunan and Hubei provinces. Its highest peak elevation is 2,098.7 metres (6,885 ft), making it the second highest peak in Hunan, after Ling Peak (酃峰), which stands 2,115.2 metres (6,940 ft) above sea level.

== History ==
Huping Mountain was designated as a Provincial Nature Reserve by Hunan Provincial People's Government in 1982 and was rated as a National Nature Reserve by the State Council of China in 1994.

== Geography ==
Huping Mountain is a part of the Wuling Mountains, lies at the northern end of the Wuling Mountains, with 266 peaks above 1,000 metres (3,300 ft) above sea level. It has an area of 600-square-kilometre (230 sq mi), all of which belongs to Shimen County.

There are seven streams and brooks rise in Huping Mountain, all of them flow into the Xie River (渫水), a first level tributary of the Lishui River.

There are over 100 waterfalls in Huping Mountain, which known as "Huping Flying Waterfalls" (壶瓶飞瀑) is one of the "Ten Scenic Spots of Changde".

== Biology ==
There are a large number of flora and fauna in Huping Mountain, with over 6,500 species currently recognized, including 570 species of vertebrates belonging to 4 classes, 30 orders, and 100 families, including 9 species of national first-class protected animals such as leopard, clouded leopard, dwarf musk deer, golden eagle, scaly-sided merganser, oriental stork, black stork, and Chinese pangolin. There are also 49 species of national second-class key protected animals such as Chinese giant salamander, temminck's tragopan, macaque, and mainland serow. 4,145 species of insects also inhabit the mountain.

There are 3,080 species of vascular plants belonging to 1,026 genera in 227 families in Huping Mountain, including 7 species of national first-class protected plants such as Davidia involucrata, Davidia involucrata var vilmoriniana, Ginkgo, Taxus chinensis, Taxus chinensis var. mairei, Bretschneidera sinensis, and Metasequoia glyptostroboides, as well as 29 species of national second-class protected plants such as Tetracentron sinense, Cercidiphyllum japonicum, Liriodendron chinense, and Emmenopterys.

=== South China Tiger Release Natural Experimental Zone ===
In history, the South China tiger once lived in the mountain.

In 2011, the National Forestry Administration (now National Forestry and Grassland Administration) officially designated Huping Mountain as one of the natural experimental areas for releasing South China tigers.

== Literature ==
When the Tang dynasty (618–917) poet Li Bai was exiled, he passed by Huping Mountain and left behind the famous line: "The waterfall flies over Huping Mountain, and peach blossoms fall from the cave entrance." (壺瓶飛瀑布，洞口落桃花)
