= Xujiafang =

Xujiafang Township 许家坊乡
- Township
- Location in Hunan
- Coordinates: 29°14′34″N 110°39′11″E
- Country: People's Republic of China
- Province: Hunan
- Prefecture-level city: Zhangjiajie
- County: Cili

Area
  - Total: 80.52 km^{2} (31.09 sq mi)

Population
  - Total: 19,500
  - Density: 242/km^{2} (627/sq mi)
- Time zone: UTC+8 (China Standard)
- Area code: 0744

Xujiafang Township (simplified Chinese: 许家坊乡; traditional Chinese: 許家坊鄉; pinyin: Xǔjiāfāng Xiāng) is a rural township in Cili County, Hunan Province, People's Republic of China.

== Administrative divisions ==
The township is divided into 16 villages, which include the following areas: Qilin Village, Hongping Village, Longping Village, Yankou Village, Nanzhuang Village, Dengjie Village, Yangqiao Village, Dayu Village, Xianshui Village, Yangping Village, Duijin Village, Datang Village, Qipan Village, Xinjian Village, Fushi Village, and Chenping Village (麒麟村、红坪村、龙坪村、岩口村、南庄村、邓界村、杨桥村、大峪村、咸水村、阳坪村、堆金村、大塘村、棋盘村、新建村、浮石村、陈坪村).
