= Ganyan, Cili =

Ganyan Township 甘堰土家族乡
- Township
- Location in Hunan
- Coordinates: 29°16′43″N 110°46′45″E
- Country: People's Republic of China
- Province: Hunan
- Prefecture-level city: Zhangjiajie
- County: Cili County

Area
  - Total: 97 km^{2} (37 sq mi)

Population
  - Total: 19,000
  - Density: 200/km^{2} (510/sq mi)
- Time zone: UTC+8 (China Standard)
- Area code: 0744

Ganyan Township (simplified Chinese: 甘堰土家族乡; traditional Chinese: 甘堰土家族鄉; pinyin: Gānyàn Tǔjiāzú Xiāng) is a rural township in Cili County, Hunan Province, People's Republic of China.

== Administrative divisions ==
The township is divided into 21 villages:

- Ganyan (甘堰村)
- Wanfu (万福村)
- Guizhu (贵竹村)
- Dongyu (东峪村)
- Zhongxin (中心村)
- Baiyan (白岩村)
- Liangyu (两峪村)
- Cuanxi (氽溪村)
- Yuetai (月台村)
- Siping (四坪村)
- Sanping (三坪村)
- Taiping (太坪村)
- Taoya (桃垭村)
- Yanzhu (烟竹村)
- Ma'an (马安村)
- Qinzhong (勤中村)
- Gaoling (高岭村)
- Chuanshi (川石村)
- Jinyan (金岩村)
- Pingxi (坪溪村)
- Yuanyichang (园艺场)
