= Longtanhe =

Longtanhe Town 龙潭河镇
- Town
- Location in Hunan
- Coordinates: 29°14′29″N 111°04′19″E
- Country: People's Republic of China
- Province: Hunan
- Prefecture-level city: Zhangjiajie
- County: Cili

Area
  - Total: 92.6 km^{2} (35.8 sq mi)

Population
  - Total: 13,000
  - Density: 140/km^{2} (360/sq mi)
- Time zone: UTC+8 (China Standard)
- Area code: 0744

Longtanhe Town (simplified Chinese: 龙潭河镇; traditional Chinese: 龍潭河鎮; pinyin: Lóngtánhé Zhèn) is an urban town in Cili County, Hunan Province, People's Republic of China.

== Administrative divisions ==
The town is divided into 14 villages and 2 communities, which include the following areas: Tieshutan Community, Jiedao Community, Nanmu Village, Shuiping Village, Yanping Village, Changyan Village, Zhuyu Village, Changgang Village, Feima Village, Tianwan Village, Yinmachi Village, Jiangxing Village, Dahu Village, Panping Village, Wengao Village, and Zhengtai Village (铁树潭社区、街道社区、楠木村、水坪村、岩坪村、长岩村、竹峪村、长岗村、飞马村、田湾村、银马池村、江星村、大湖村、潘坪村、文高村、郑台村).
