= Erfangping =

Erfangping Township 二坊坪乡
- Township
- Location in Hunan
- Coordinates: 29°17′31″N 111°11′02″E
- Country: People's Republic of China
- Province: Hunan
- Prefecture-level city: Zhangjiajie
- County: Cili County

Area
  - Total: 97.3 km^{2} (37.6 sq mi)

Population
  - Total: 9,483
  - Density: 97.5/km^{2} (252/sq mi)
- Time zone: UTC+8 (China Standard)
- Area code: 0744

Erfangping Township (simplified Chinese: 二坊坪乡; traditional Chinese: 二坊坪鄉; pinyin: Èrfāngpíng Xiāng) is a rural township in Cili County, Hunan Province, People's Republic of China.

== Administrative divisions ==
The township is divided into 11 villages, which include the following areas: Erfangping Village, Huangshaping Village, Xinjian Village, Qingye Village, Dongsheng Village, Shuanglian Village, Dongtan Village, Zhanjiaqiao Village, Shengde Village, Gaoxi Village, and Yanwu Village (二坊坪村、黄沙坪村、新建村、青叶村、东升村、双联村、洞潭村、占甲桥村、盛德村、高溪村、岩屋村).
