= Shimen County =

Shimen County 石门县 Shihmen
- County
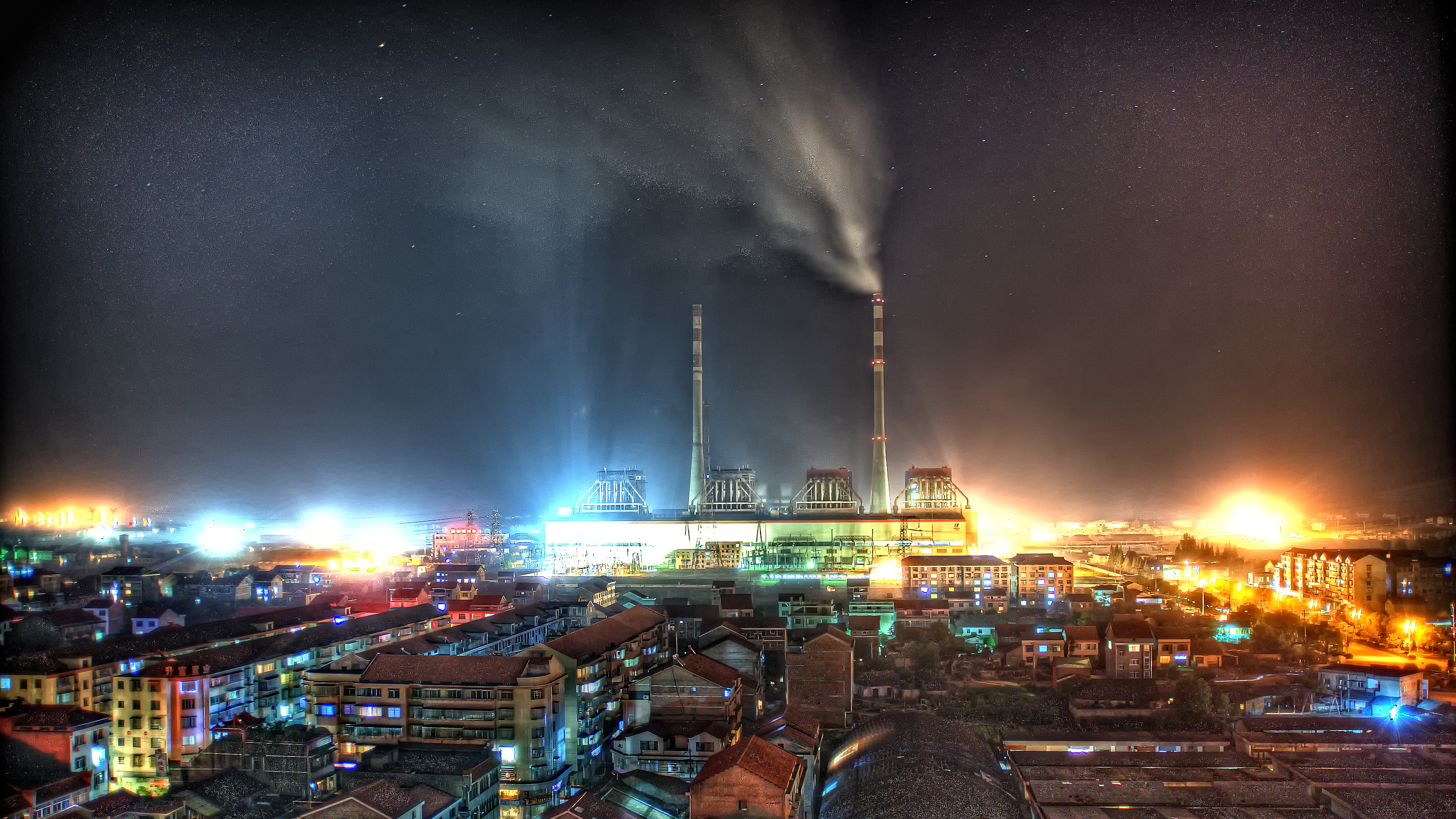

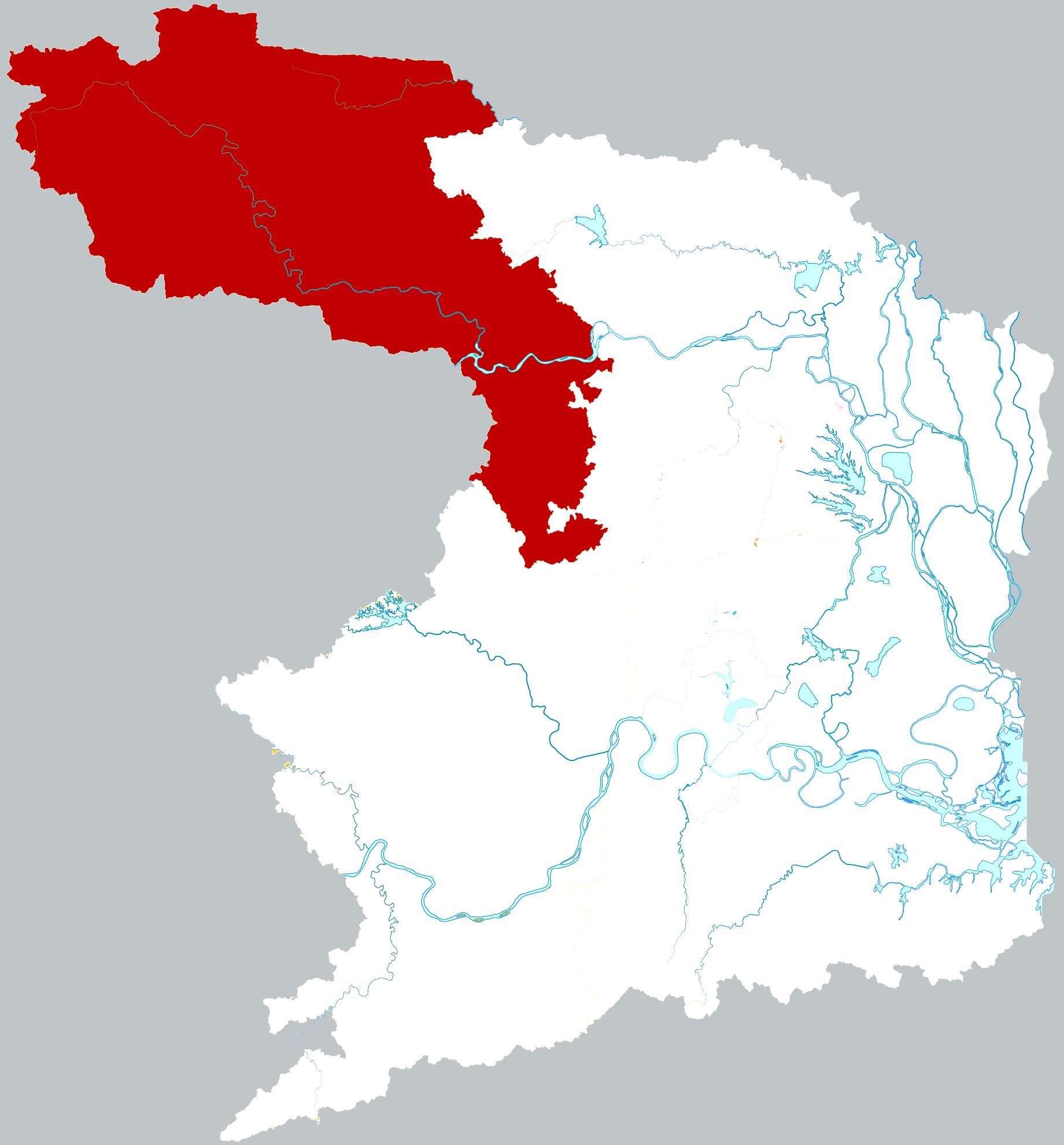
- Location of Shimen County within Changde

- Location in Hunan
- Coordinates: 29°41′56″N 111°01′01″E
- Country: People's Republic of China
- Province: Hunan
- Prefecture-level city: Changde

Area
  - Total: 3,970.13 km^{2} (1,532.88 sq mi)

Population
  - Total: 559,500
  - Density: 140.9/km^{2} (365.0/sq mi)
- Time zone: UTC+8 (China Standard)
- Website: www.shimen.gov.cn

Shimen County (simplified Chinese: 石门县; traditional Chinese: 石門縣; pinyin: Shímén Xiàn) is the northernmost county of Hunan Province, China, bordering Hubei Province to the north. It is under administration of the prefecture-level city of Changde.

Located on the northern margin of Hunan and the west of Changde, Shimen County is bordered to the south and southwest by Taoyuan, Cili and Sangzhi Counties, to the west by Hefeng County of Hubei, to the north by Wufeng County of Hubei, to the east by Songzi City of Hubei, Li and Linli Counties. Shimen is a mountainous county located on the Wuling Mountains, Mount Huping (壶瓶山) which, at 2,098.7 metres (6,885 ft) on the northwest of the county, is the highest point of Hunan. Shimen is also the home of the Tujia people, the descendant of Chinese ancient Ba People. The Tujia people shares 50.9% of the population in the county.

The county has an area of 3,973 kilometres (2,469 mi) with 669,741 of registered population and 601,100 of permanent population (as of 2015). It is divided into 19 towns and townships, five units of State-owned farms (as of 2016).

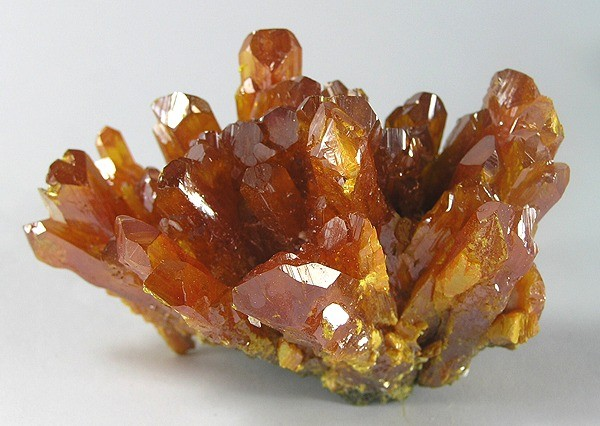
Orpiment, Jiepaiyu Mine, Shimen County, China. Size: 6.4 x 3.9 x 3.4 cm.

== Administrative divisions ==
According to the result on adjustment of township-level administrative divisions of Shimen County in January 2016 and May 29, 2015, Shimen County has four subdistricts, 11 towns, six townships and management area of five state-owned farms under its jurisdiction. They are:

4 subdistricts

- Chujiang Town (Chujiang and Yongxin subdistricts)
- Erdu Township (Erdu and Baofeng subdistricts)

11 towns

- Baiyun (白云镇)
- Hupingshan (壶瓶山镇)
- Jiashan (夹山镇)
- Mengquan (蒙泉镇)
- Moshi (磨市镇)
- Nanbei (南北镇)
- Taiping (太平镇)
- Weixin (维新镇)
- Xinguan (新关镇)
- Yijiadu (易家渡镇)
- Zaoshi (皂市镇)

6 townships

- Luoping (罗坪乡)
- Sansheng (三圣乡)
- Suojie (所街乡)
- Xinpu (新铺乡)
- Yanchi (雁池乡)
- Ziliang (子良乡)

5 State-owned farms

- Datongshan (大同山林场)
- Dongshanfeng (东山峰农场)
- Longfengyuan (龙凤园艺场)
- Luopusi (洛浦寺林场)
- Xiupingyuan (秀坪园艺场)

Other unit

- the Management Office of Jiashan mountain (夹山管理处)

== Geography ==
The highest point in Shimen County is Huping Mountain, which is at 2,098.7 metres (6,885 ft) above sea level.

=== Climate ===
Climate data for Shimen, elevation 117 m (384 ft), (1991–2020 normals, extremes 1981–present)
Month	Jan	Feb	Mar	Apr	May	Jun	Jul	Aug	Sep	Oct	Nov	Dec	Year
Record high °C (°F)	22.2 (72.0)	29.5 (85.1)	35.1 (95.2)	36.6 (97.9)	36.6 (97.9)	38.5 (101.3)	39.8 (103.6)	40.7 (105.3)	38.2 (100.8)	34.7 (94.5)	30.6 (87.1)	24.9 (76.8)	40.7 (105.3)
Mean daily maximum °C (°F)	8.8 (47.8)	11.6 (52.9)	16.5 (61.7)	22.7 (72.9)	27.0 (80.6)	29.9 (85.8)	32.8 (91.0)	32.5 (90.5)	28.4 (83.1)	22.8 (73.0)	17.1 (62.8)	11.3 (52.3)	21.8 (71.2)
Daily mean °C (°F)	5.1 (41.2)	7.5 (45.5)	11.8 (53.2)	17.6 (63.7)	22.0 (71.6)	25.4 (77.7)	28.2 (82.8)	27.8 (82.0)	23.7 (74.7)	18.2 (64.8)	12.6 (54.7)	7.3 (45.1)	17.3 (63.1)
Mean daily minimum °C (°F)	2.4 (36.3)	4.5 (40.1)	8.3 (46.9)	13.6 (56.5)	18.2 (64.8)	21.9 (71.4)	24.6 (76.3)	24.3 (75.7)	20.3 (68.5)	15.0 (59.0)	9.4 (48.9)	4.4 (39.9)	13.9 (57.0)
Record low °C (°F)	−4.2 (24.4)	−3.9 (25.0)	−1.8 (28.8)	2.1 (35.8)	10.2 (50.4)	13.9 (57.0)	18.4 (65.1)	16.7 (62.1)	11.1 (52.0)	3.7 (38.7)	−1.1 (30.0)	−4.8 (23.4)	−4.8 (23.4)
Average precipitation mm (inches)	47.9 (1.89)	57.0 (2.24)	88.6 (3.49)	140.4 (5.53)	179.9 (7.08)	220.9 (8.70)	237.3 (9.34)	143.3 (5.64)	92.8 (3.65)	87.8 (3.46)	64.5 (2.54)	29.9 (1.18)	1,390.3 (54.74)
Average precipitation days (≥ 0.1 mm)	10.1	10.7	13.2	13.8	14.6	13.8	12.4	11.0	9.5	11.0	10.2	8.1	138.4
Average snowy days	4.7	2.7	1.1	0.1	0	0	0	0	0	0	0.2	1.8	10.6
Average relative humidity (%)	75	75	75	75	77	81	80	78	76	76	77	73	77
Mean monthly sunshine hours	74.9	75.7	104.0	131.2	142.8	141.8	198.8	199.0	145.7	124.5	108.9	93.4	1,540.7
Percentage possible sunshine	23	24	28	34	34	34	47	49	40	35	34	29	34
Source: China Meteorological Administration
