= Xiangshi, Cili =

Xiangshi Town 象市镇
- Town
- Location in Hunan
- Coordinates: 29°31′01″N 110°49′58″E
- Country: People's Republic of China
- Province: Hunan
- Prefecture-level city: Zhangjiajie
- County: Cili

Area
  - Total: 100.4 km^{2} (38.8 sq mi)
- Time zone: UTC+8 (China Standard)
- Area code: 0744

Xiangshi Town (simplified Chinese: 象市镇; traditional Chinese: 象市鎮; pinyin: Xiàngshì Zhèn) is an urban town in Cili County, Hunan Province, People's Republic of China.

== Administrative divisions ==
The town is divided into 23 villages and 1 community, which include the following areas: Xiangshiqiao Community, Taiping Village, Longxing Village, Shuangqiao Village, Gaoqiao Village, Dajian Village, Lizi Village, Xiegao Village, Sanqiao Village, Fuping Village, Baima Village, Cheyan Village, Shuangchao Village, Liya Village, Xuri Village, Xiangxi Village, Baiyang Village, Shuangzhou Village, Longping Village, Shuangta Village, Shuanglian Village, Fangma Village, and Hutou Village (象市桥社区、太平村、龙兴村、双桥村、高潮村、大尖村、李子村、谢高村、三桥村、符坪村、白马村、走马村、坼岩村、双潮村、栗垭村、旭日村、向溪村、白杨村、双洲村、龙坪村、双塔村、双联村、放马村、虎头村).
