= Yanghe Tujia Ethnic Township =

Yanghe Township 阳和土家族乡
- Township
- Location in Hunan
- Coordinates: 29°15′47″N 110°41′57″E
- Country: People's Republic of China
- Province: Hunan
- Prefecture-level city: Zhangjiajie
- County: Cili

Area
  - Total: 74 km^{2} (29 sq mi)

Population
  - Total: 18,000
  - Density: 240/km^{2} (630/sq mi)
- Time zone: UTC+8 (China Standard)
- Area code: 0744

Yanghe Township (simplified Chinese: 阳和土家族乡; traditional Chinese: 陽和土家族鄉; pinyin: Yánghé Tǔjiāzú Xiāng) is a rural township in Cili County, Hunan Province, People's Republic of China.

== Administrative divisions ==
The township is divided into 16 villages, which include the following areas: Jiashi Village, Dafang Village, Zhaiyu Village, Zhujiazui Village, Shuangping Village, Yufu Village, Guanfang Village, Taoxi Village, Sanxi Village, Changling Village, Liziping Village, Daijiashan Village, Yangjiaping Village, Zhenjiaping Village, Qifangyu Village, and Fengyu Village.
