= Tongjinpu =

Tongjinpu Town 通津铺镇
- Town
- Location in Hunan
- Coordinates: 29°32′21″N 110°57′56″E
- Country: People's Republic of China
- Province: Hunan
- Prefecture-level city: Zhangjiajie
- County: Cili

Area
  - Total: 93 km^{2} (36 sq mi)

Population
  - Total: 27,800
  - Density: 300/km^{2} (770/sq mi)
- Time zone: UTC+8 (China Standard)
- Area code: 0744

Tongjinpu Town (simplified Chinese: 通津铺镇; traditional Chinese: 通津鋪鎮; pinyin: Tōngjīnpū Zhèn) is an urban town in Cili County, Hunan Province, People's Republic of China.

== Administrative divisions ==
The town is divided into 23 villages and 4 communities, including: Houxiyu Community, Shichanghe Community, Tongjinpu Community, Yanzi Community, Fengdong Village, Changyupu Village, Shuijing Village, Shuitang Village, Hejing Village, Liuziquan Village, Erwutai Village, Yuquan Village, Zhuyeping Village, Suoping Village, Xingyu Village, Yueta Village, Qianbu Village, Kuihuatai Village, Chenping Village, Sihuping Village, Zhaojiaping Village, Cuanhu Village, Pingshan Village, Miaoshan Village, Huanggang Village, Huahe Village, and Jiuling Village (后溪峪社区、市场河社区、通津铺社区、燕子社区、风洞村、长峪铺村、水井村、水淌村、河井村、柳子泉村、二吾台村、渔泉村、竹叶坪村、锁坪村、星峪村、月塌村、千步村、葵花台村、陈坪村、泗虎坪村、赵家坪村、氽湖村、坪山村、苗山村、黄岗村、花合村、九岭村).
