= Guangfuqiao =

Guangfuqiao Town 广福桥镇
- Town
- Location in Hunan
- Coordinates: 29°28′45″N 111°17′51″E
- Country: People's Republic of China
- Province: Hunan
- Prefecture-level city: Zhangjiajie
- County: Cili County

Area
  - Total: 94 km^{2} (36 sq mi)

Population
  - Total: 14,500
  - Density: 150/km^{2} (400/sq mi)
- Time zone: UTC+8 (China Standard)
- Area code: 0744

Guangfuqiao Town (simplified Chinese: 广福桥镇; traditional Chinese: 廣福橋鎮; pinyin: Guǎngfúqiáo Zhèn) is an urban town in and subdivision of Cili County, Hunan Province, People's Republic of China.

== Administrative divisions ==
The town is divided into 14 villages and 1 community, which include the following areas: Guangfu Community, Sanwang Village, Xinyin Village, Shuangyun Village, Taoxi Village, Taiping Village, Sansi Village, Laopeng Village, Guanjian Village, Jinggang Village, Wulonggang Village, Jianshe Village, Shiyan Village, Taoshu Village, and Liangshi Village (广福社区、三王村、辛银村、双云村、桃溪村、太坪村、三丝村、老棚村、官见村、井岗村、乌龙岗村、建设村、狮岩村、桃树村、亮狮村).
