= Dongxi, Cili =

Dongxi Township 洞溪乡
- Township
- Location in Hunan
- Coordinates: 29°08′31″N 110°49′08″E
- Country: People's Republic of China
- Province: Hunan
- Prefecture-level city: Zhangjiajie
- County: Cili County

Area
  - Total: 120.7 km^{2} (46.6 sq mi)

Population
  - Total: 11,000
  - Density: 91/km^{2} (240/sq mi)
- Time zone: UTC+8 (China Standard)
- Area code: 0744

Dongxi Township (simplified Chinese: 洞溪乡; traditional Chinese: 洞溪鄉; pinyin: Dòngxī Xiāng) is a rural township in Cili County, Zhangjiajie, Hunan Province, People's Republic of China.
