= Sanhekou, Cili =

Sanhekou Township 三合口乡
- Township
- Location in Hunan
- Coordinates: 29°37′32″N 110°49′17″E
- Country: People's Republic of China
- Province: Hunan
- Prefecture-level city: Zhangjiajie
- County: Cili

Area
  - Total: 115 km^{2} (44 sq mi)

Population
  - Total: 9,021
  - Density: 78.4/km^{2} (203/sq mi)
- Time zone: UTC+8 (China Standard)
- Area code: 0744

Sanhekou Township (simplified Chinese: 三合口乡; traditional Chinese: 三合口鄉; pinyin: Sānhékǒu Xiāng) is a rural township in Cili County, Hunan Province, People's Republic of China.

== Administrative divisions ==
The township is divided into 18 villages, which include the following areas: Sanhekou Village, Shatang Village, Wangyueping Village, Yangliu Village, Zhanma Village, Huazi Village, Yingta Village, Shuanglong Village, Tudiya Village, Guanyan Village, Xiaoxiyu Village, Shuiya Village, Fengquan Village, Sangshu Village, Chiyan Village, Shenglong Village, and Zaohua Village (三合口村、沙塘村、望月坪村、杨柳村、战马村、划字村、英塔村、双龙村、马汉村、土地垭村、关岩村、小溪峪村、水垭村、丰泉村、桑树村、池岩村、圣龙村、造化村).
