= Gaofeng Tujia Ethnic Township =

Gaofeng Tujia Ethnic Township 高峰土家族乡
- Ethnic Township
- Location in Hunan
- Coordinates: 29°26′21″N 110°54′47″E
- Country: People's Republic of China
- Province: Hunan
- Prefecture-level city: Zhangjiajie
- County: Cili County

Area
  - Total: 144.52 km^{2} (55.80 sq mi)

Population (2018)
  - Total: 16,784
  - Density: 116.14/km^{2} (300.79/sq mi)
- Time zone: UTC+8 (China Standard)
- Area code: 0744

Gaofeng Tujia Ethnic Township (simplified Chinese: 高峰土家族乡; traditional Chinese: 高峰土家族鄉; pinyin: Gāofēng Tǔjiāzú Xiāng) is a rural Tujia ethnic township in Cili County, Hunan Province, China. The ethnic township spans an area of 144.52 square kilometres (55.80 mi^{2}), and has a population of 16,784 as of 2018.

== Administrative divisions ==
Gaofeng Tujia Ethnic Township is divided into the following 16 administrative villages:

- Sanxi Village (Chinese: 三溪村)
- Shuangxing Village (Chinese: 双星村)
- Fuya Village (Chinese: 富垭村)
- Kangjiaping Village (Chinese: 康家坪村)
- Mao'an Village (Chinese: 茅庵村)
- Taoshuping Village (Chinese: 桃树坪村)
- Nanjing Village (Chinese: 南井村)
- Yuanyangchi Village (Chinese: 鸳鸯池村)
- Gandonghe Village (Chinese: 干洞河村)
- Loujiang Village (Chinese: 溇江村)
- Jingyang Village (Chinese: 景阳村)
- Gaofeng Village (Chinese: 高峰村)
- Huashan Village (Chinese: 华山村)
- Longquan Village (Chinese: 龙泉村)
- Xuelian Village (Chinese: 雪莲村)
- Kangle Village (Chinese: 康乐村)
