= Sanguansi =

Rural township in Hunan

Sanguansi Township 三官寺乡
- Township
- Location in Hunan
- Coordinates: 29°25′44″N 110°39′05″E
- Country: People's Republic of China
- Province: Hunan
- Prefecture-level city: Zhangjiajie
- County: Cili

Area
  - Total: 114 km^{2} (44 sq mi)

Population
  - Total: 24,000
  - Density: 210/km^{2} (550/sq mi)
- Time zone: UTC+8 (China Standard)
- Area code: 0744

Sanguansi Township (simplified Chinese: 三官寺乡; traditional Chinese: 三官寺鄉; pinyin: Sānguānsì Xiāng) is a rural township in Cili County, Hunan Province, People's Republic of China.

== Administrative divisions ==
The township is divided into 26 villages, which include the following areas: Sanguansi Village, Miaoling Village, Yunshan Village, Zhuya Village, Sanping Village, Fengping Village, Shuangyu Village, Zhaigang Village, Shuangquan Village, Daquan Village, Shuanglong Village, Qingfeng Village, Shequan Village, Shuanggao Village, Qinglong Village, Yuanjiaping Village, Ganquan Village, Luotan Village, Shuangqiao Village, Yuanjiazhuang Village, Shuangya Village, Shuangping Village, Wuwangpo Village, Changling Village, Hujiaping Village, and Jiehe Village (三官寺村、苗岭村、云山村、朱垭村、三坪村、丰坪村、双峪村、寨岗村、双泉村、大泉村、双龙村、庆丰村、射泉村、双高村、青龙村、袁家坪村、甘泉村、罗潭村、双桥村、袁家庄村、双垭村、双坪村、吴王坡村、长岭村、胡家坪村、界河村).
