= Chujiang Subdistrict =

Subdistrict in Shimen, Hunan, China

Coordinates: 29°35′21″N 111°22′26″E

Chujiang Subdistrict (Chinese: 楚江街道; pinyin: Chǔjiāng jiēdào) is a subdistrict and the county seat of Shimen in Hunan, China. Chujiang Town is located in the south central Shimen County, it is bordered by Yijiadu Town (Chinese: 易家渡镇) to the northeast and east, Erdu Township to the south, and Xinguan Town (Chinese: 新关镇) to the west and north. The town has an area of 66.75 km^{2} (25.77 sq mi) with a population of 109,522 (as of 2010 census), and it is divided into 15 communities.

== History ==
Chujiang is an ancient town, it was formerly known as Shimen (Chinese: 石门). The seat of Tianmen Prefecture (Chinese: 天门郡) was transferred to the place during the period of Southern dynasties (420–589 AD). In the 2nd year of Emperor Wu of Chen dynasty (558 AD), Tianmen Prefecture was renamed as Shimen Prefecture (Chinese: 石门郡). In the 9th year of Emperor Wen of Sui (589 AD), Shimen County was established while Shimen Prefecture ceased as a prefecture. Then after that, it has been the seat of Shimen County.

The town was named as Tianmen Town (Chinese: 天门镇) in 1935, and changed as Zhongxin Township (Chinese: 中心乡) in 1938. It was reorganized as town of Chujiang (Chinese: 楚江) taken its name after the famous Chujiang Tower (Chinese: 楚江楼) there in 1943. It was renamed as Chengguan Town (Chinese: 城关镇) in January 1951 and reorganized as Chengshi People's Commune (Chinese: 城市人民公社) in April 1960, and Chengguan Town in July 1972. It was restored to the name of Chujiang in June 1995.
