= Miaoshi, Cili =

Miaoshi Town 苗市镇
- Town
- Location in Hunan
- Coordinates: 29°32′48″N 111°14′40″E
- Country: People's Republic of China
- Province: Hunan
- Prefecture-level city: Zhangjiajie
- County: Cili

Area
  - Total: 101.7 km^{2} (39.3 sq mi)

Population
  - Total: 25,000
  - Density: 250/km^{2} (640/sq mi)
- Time zone: UTC+8 (China Standard)
- Area code: 0744

Miaoshi Town (simplified Chinese: 苗市镇; traditional Chinese: 苗市鎮; pinyin: Miáoshì Zhèn) is an urban town in Cili County, Hunan Province, People's Republic of China.

== Administrative divisions ==
The town is divided into 24 villages and 1 community, which include the following areas: Miaoshi Community, Huanghua Village, Bao'an Village, Liuwang Village, Yidoujie Village, Douliang Village, Xincang Village, Xinxing Village, Xiaosha Village, Mawang Village, Gaoqiao Village, Wantian Village, Lishu Village, Daxing Village, Tianxing Village, Guanmai Village, Mingyue Village, Dongyang Village, Hehua Village, Dongwan Village, Jiewan Village, Jiexi Village, Dongyue Village, Longyang Village, Chalin Village, and Bailong Village (苗市社区、黄花村、保安村、六王村、一斗界村、斗量村、新苍村、新星村、小沙村、麻王村、高桥村、碗田村、栗树村、大兴村、天星村、关脉村、明月村、东洋村、荷花村、洞湾村、界溪村、东岳村、龙阳村、茶林村、白龙村).
