= Lingyang, Cili =

Lingyang Town 零阳镇
- Town
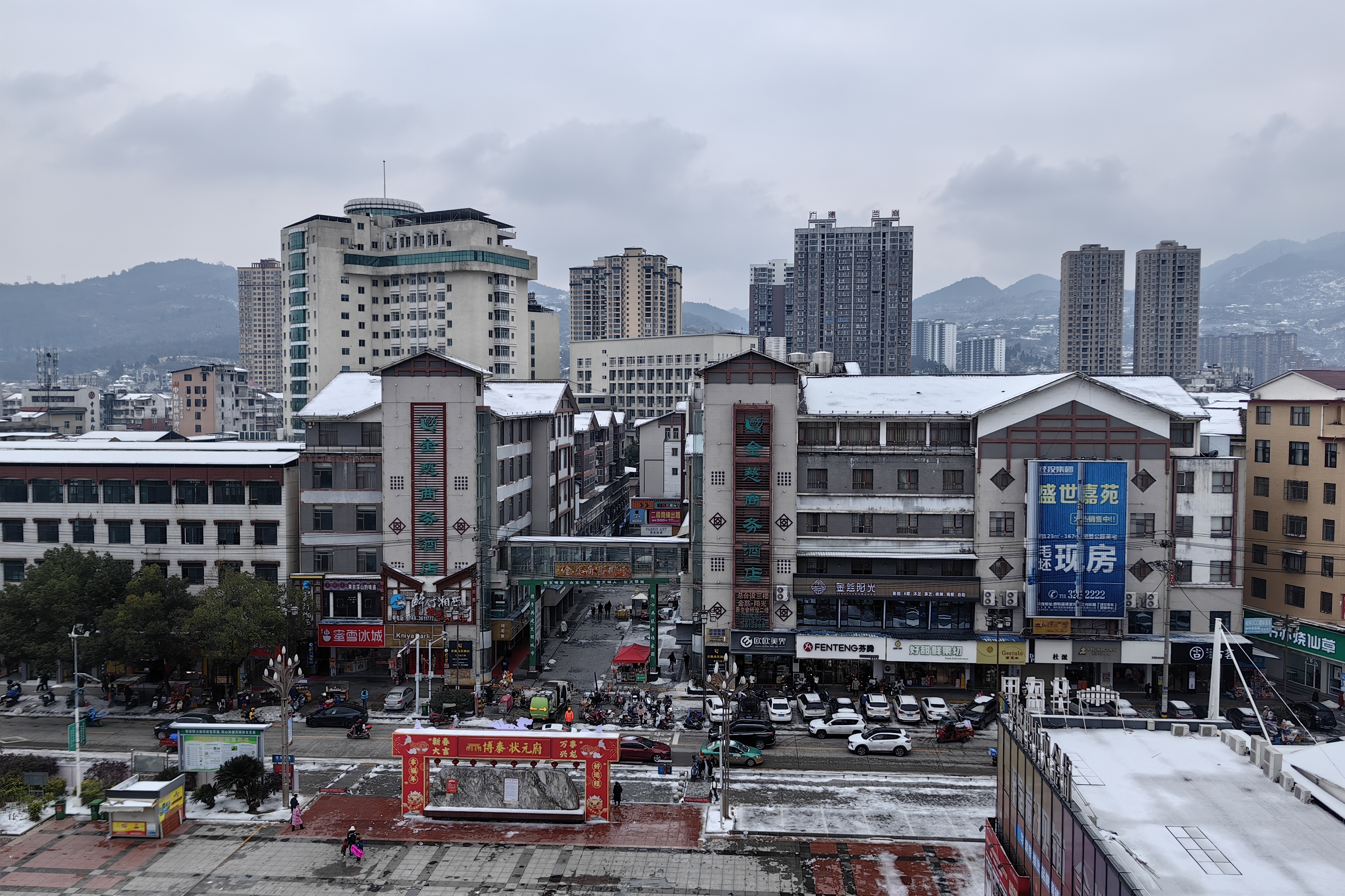

- Location in Hunan
- Coordinates: 29°25′21″N 111°07′19″E
- Country: People's Republic of China
- Province: Hunan
- Prefecture-level city: Zhangjiajie
- County: Cili

Area
  - Total: 316 km^{2} (122 sq mi)

Population
  - Total: 130,000
  - Density: 410/km^{2} (1,100/sq mi)
- Time zone: UTC+8 (China Standard)
- Area code: 0744

Lingyang Town (simplified Chinese: 零阳镇; traditional Chinese: 零陽鎮; pinyin: Língyáng Zhèn) is an urban town and the seat of Cili County, Hunan, China.

== Administrative division ==
The town is divided into 57 villages and 15 communities:

- Nanjie Community
- Dongjie Community
- Beijie Community
- Xijie Community
- Zixia Community
- Baishajing Community
- Chaowangta Community
- Liyuqiao Community
- Baiyun Community
- Tongtai Community
- Jintai Community
- Taiping Community
- Beigang Community
- Longping Community
- Baigongcheng Community
- Pipa Village
- Longfeng Village
- Bijia Village
- Lingxi Village
- Shiban Village
- Minhe Village
- Zhongxin Village
- Baizhushui Village
- Renhe Village
- Yunpan Village
- Liangxi Village
- Qicong Village
- Shuiwang Village
- Qingshan Village
- Baishaxi Village
- Jinhua Village
- Shima Village
- Haojiashan Village
- Changqing Village
- Tongxin Village
- Yong'an Village
- Tianxing Village
- Fengyang Village
- Zengshan Village
- Cha'an Village
- Baolian Village
- Luping Village
- Chenxiyu Village
- Baizhupo Village
- Fenggang Village
- Liulin Village
- Baiyang Village
- Tieqiao Village
- Tuanxi Village
- Xingfu Village
- Chenjiashan Village
- Liangya Village
- Tuanpo Village
- Moyan Village
- Qixiangping Village
- Nanyang Village
- Sangmuxi Village
- Jinlong Village
- Daxing Village
- Changtanhe Village
- Yanluo Village
- Yajing Village
- Changjian Village
- Lishan Village
- Nanzhu Village
- Shengli Village
- Kexi Village
- Dashaxi Village
- Xingyan Village
- Bamao Village
- Yintian Village
- Fengya Village
- Xianyuanyichang
