= Gaoqiao, Cili =

Gaoqiao Town 高桥镇
- Town
- Location in Hunan
- Coordinates: 29°10′37″N 110°59′07″E
- Country: People's Republic of China
- Province: Hunan
- Prefecture-level city: Zhangjiajie
- County: Cili County

Area
  - Total: 171 km^{2} (66 sq mi)

Population
  - Total: 14,500
  - Density: 84.8/km^{2} (220/sq mi)
- Time zone: UTC+8 (China Standard)
- Area code: 0744

Gaoqiao Town (simplified Chinese: 高桥镇; traditional Chinese: 高橋鎮; pinyin: Gāoqiáo Zhèn) is an urban town in Cili County, Hunan Province, People's Republic of China.

== Administrative divisions ==
The town is divided into 19 villages and 2 communities, which include the following areas: Gaoqiao Community, Tingziqiao Community, Yanyin Village, Siping Village, Chenjiahe Village, Guangming Village, Huajiaoping Village, Qiumushan Village, Yangping Village, Dushuya Village, Caishu Village, Zaoniyu Village, Shachang Village, Baizhuyu Village, Huanglin Village, Xingtiankou Village, Jiantan Village, Baiguo Village, Jinyan Village, Xinshan Village, and Changbai Village (高桥社区、亭子桥社区、岩音村、四坪村、陈家河村、光明村、花椒坪村、秋木山村、阳坪村、杜树垭村、才树村、皂泥峪村、砂场村、白竹峪村、黄林村、兴田口村、枧潭村、白果村、金堰村、新山村、长白村).
