= Jian Tan =

Jian Tan (見曇法師)
- Title: Abbot

Personal life
- Occupation: Buddhist monk

Religious life
- Religion: Buddhism

Jian Tan (simplified Chinese: 见昙; traditional Chinese: 見曇; pinyin: JiànTán) is a Buddhist monk and current abbot of the Chung Tai Zen Center of Houston in Houston, Texas.

== Exposure to Buddhism ==
Soon after he obtained a doctorate in electrical engineering from National Taiwan University, Jian Tan was exposed to the teachings of Buddhism. His newfound interest in religion led him to explore the writings of the Chan Buddhism masters Xu Yun and Wei Chueh.

In 1995, he attended a Zen Seven Day Retreat at Lin Chuan Monastery, which was presided over by Wei Chueh. Jian Tan was ordained at Chung Tai Chan Monastery in 2003 and completed his education at the Buddhist institute four years later.

== Leadership ==
He later traveled to the United States, where he obtained a master's degree in Teaching English for Speakers of Other Languages (TESOL) at San Jose State University. In 2009, he was appointed Vice Abbot of Chung Tai Chan Monastery and became dean of academic affairs at the Chung Tai Buddhist Institute.

Jian Tan was appointed abbot of the Zen Center in March 2012. He has vowed to propagate Buddhism in the United States through community outreach among English speakers.

On March 12, 2019, Jian Tan led prayer at the Commissioners Court of Fort Bend County, Texas.
