= Cili County =

Cili County 慈利县 Tzeli
- County
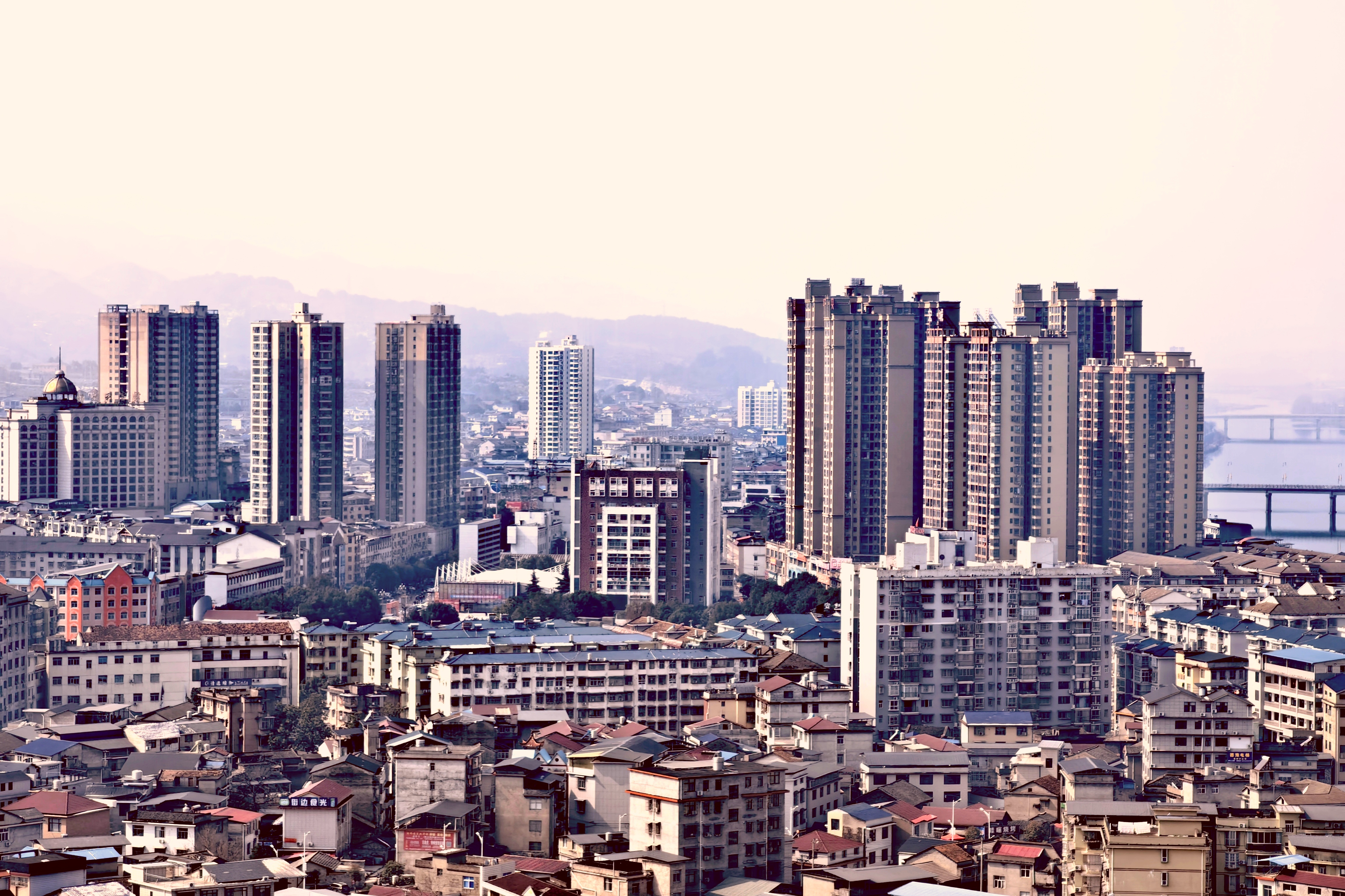

- Location of Cili County within Zhangjiajie

- Location in Hunan
- Coordinates: 29°22′44″N 110°57′22″E
- Country: People's Republic of China
- Province: Hunan
- Prefecture-level city: Zhangjiajie
- Seat: Lingyang

Area
  - Total: 3,492.02 km^{2} (1,348.28 sq mi)

Population
  - Total: 684,300
  - Density: 196.0/km^{2} (507.5/sq mi)
- Time zone: UTC+8 (China Standard)

Cili (simplified Chinese: 慈利县; traditional Chinese: 慈利縣; pinyin: Cílì Xiàn) is a county in Hunan Province, China under administration of the prefecture-level city of Zhangjiajie. Located in the north of Hunan and the east of Zhangjiajie, Cili County is bordered to the southeast by Taoyuan County, to the south and the southwest by Yongding District, to the west and the northwest by Sangzhi County, and to the north and northeast by Shimen County. Cili is also the home of the Tujia people. The County has an area of 3,492 square kilometres (1,348 sq mi) with 703,452 of registered population and roughly 613,000 permanent population (as of 2015). It is divided into 25 township-level divisions (November 27, 2015), and its county seat is Lingyang Town (零阳镇).

Recently a tomb was discovered around Cili that was 2,200 years old. Among the items discovered was a bronze cooking vessel that contained fish. The tomb was that of an ancient senior official.

== Administrative divisions ==
According to the result on adjustment of township-level administrative divisions of Cili County on November 27, 2015, it has 15 towns and 10 townships (7 of which are ethnic townships of the Tujia people) under its jurisdiction. Its county seat is Lingyang (零阳镇). They are:

15 Towns

- Dongyueguan
- Erfangping
- Gaoqiao
- Guangfuqiao
- Lingyang
- Longtanhe
- Miaoshi
- Sanhekou
- Tongjinpu
- Xiangshi
- Xikou
- Yanbodu
- Dongxi
- Nanshanping
- Yangliupu

7 Tujia ethnic townships (土家族乡)

- Ganyan
- Gaofeng
- Jinyan
- Sanguansi
- Xujiafang
- Yanghe
- Zhaojiagang

== Climate ==
Climate data for Cili, elevation 174 m (571 ft), (1991–2020 normals, extremes 1981–present)
Month	Jan	Feb	Mar	Apr	May	Jun	Jul	Aug	Sep	Oct	Nov	Dec	Year
Record high °C (°F)	22.4 (72.3)	29.5 (85.1)	34.7 (94.5)	37.7 (99.9)	37.0 (98.6)	38.8 (101.8)	41.2 (106.2)	40.7 (105.3)	38.8 (101.8)	35.2 (95.4)	30.1 (86.2)	24.4 (75.9)	41.2 (106.2)
Mean daily maximum °C (°F)	9.6 (49.3)	12.4 (54.3)	17.2 (63.0)	23.4 (74.1)	27.6 (81.7)	30.6 (87.1)	33.6 (92.5)	33.4 (92.1)	29.3 (84.7)	23.6 (74.5)	18.0 (64.4)	12.2 (54.0)	22.6 (72.6)
Daily mean °C (°F)	5.6 (42.1)	8.0 (46.4)	12.3 (54.1)	18.0 (64.4)	22.4 (72.3)	25.8 (78.4)	28.6 (83.5)	28.3 (82.9)	24.2 (75.6)	18.6 (65.5)	13.0 (55.4)	7.8 (46.0)	17.7 (63.9)
Mean daily minimum °C (°F)	2.8 (37.0)	4.8 (40.6)	8.6 (47.5)	13.9 (57.0)	18.5 (65.3)	22.3 (72.1)	24.9 (76.8)	24.6 (76.3)	20.7 (69.3)	15.2 (59.4)	9.7 (49.5)	4.7 (40.5)	14.2 (57.6)
Record low °C (°F)	−6.2 (20.8)	−4.6 (23.7)	−2.5 (27.5)	3.2 (37.8)	8.9 (48.0)	12.5 (54.5)	18.2 (64.8)	16.5 (61.7)	12.3 (54.1)	3.6 (38.5)	−1.1 (30.0)	−4.8 (23.4)	−6.2 (20.8)
Average precipitation mm (inches)	46.4 (1.83)	57.7 (2.27)	89.2 (3.51)	141.1 (5.56)	178.0 (7.01)	218.6 (8.61)	248.3 (9.78)	151.4 (5.96)	85.1 (3.35)	90.3 (3.56)	60.2 (2.37)	28.5 (1.12)	1,394.8 (54.93)
Average precipitation days (≥ 0.1 mm)	10.2	10.7	13.3	14.1	14.8	14.2	12.9	11.4	8.8	11.1	9.7	8.3	139.5
Average snowy days	4.2	2.7	1.2	0	0	0	0	0	0	0	0.2	1.3	9.6
Average relative humidity (%)	73	73	73	73	75	79	77	75	73	75	76	72	75
Mean monthly sunshine hours	61.2	62.8	89.3	113.8	125.6	122.2	187.0	184.5	134.8	110.5	97.1	80.2	1,369
Percentage possible sunshine	19	20	24	29	30	29	44	46	37	31	31	25	30
Source: China Meteorological Administration
