= Yingchunting =

Subdistrict in Wugang, Shaoyang, Hunan, China

Coordinates: 26.74083212°N 110.64155456°E

Yingchunting (Chinese: 迎春亭街道; pinyin: Yíngchūntíng Jiēdào) is a subdistrict of Wugang City in Hunan, China. It was one of four subdistricts approved to establish in 1994. The subdistrict has an area of 89 km^{2} (34 sq mi) with a population of 68,800 (as of 2015). The subdistrict of Yingchunting has 20 villages and 4 communities under its jurisdiction. Its seat is Tuoping Village (Chinese: 托坪村).

== History ==
The subdistrict of Yingchunting was approved to establish from a part of the former Chengguan Town (Chinese: 城关镇) and three villages of Xindong, Dongta and Fengren of the former Xindong Township (Chinese: 新东乡) in 1994. On September 29, 2011, the government of Wugang City confirmed that the subdistrict had 4 communities and 2 villages under its jurisdiction with an area of 6.027 km^{2} (2.327 sq mi).

On December 2, 2015, the township of Toutang (Chinese: 头堂乡) was merged to it. The subdistrict had 33 villages and 4 communities with an area of 89 km^{2} (34 sq mi). Through the amalgamation of village-level divisions in 2016, the subdistrict has 20 villages and 4 communities under its jurisdiction.

=== Amalgamation of villages in 2016 ===
Amalgamation of villages in 2016
| villages | | former villages | |
| English | Chinese | English | Chinese |
| Caoqi Village | 曹旗村 | Caoqi Village | 曹旗村 |
| Caoqi Village | 曹旗村 | Ertang Village | 二堂村 |
| Jinming Village | 金明村 | Jinming Village | 金明村 |
| Jinming Village | 金明村 | shitouping Village | 石头坪村 |
| Tuoping Village | 托坪村 | Tuoping Village | 托坪村 |
| Tuoping Village | 托坪村 | Jiangkou Village | 江口村 |
| Shuangfeng Village | 双峰村 | Shuangfeng Village | 双峰村 |
| Shuangfeng Village | 双峰村 | Xiaoshan Village | 小山村 |
| Shiyang Village | 石羊村 | Shiyang Village | 石羊村 |
| Shiyang Village | 石羊村 | Lanma Village | 拦马村 |
| Fuxi Village | 福溪村 | Jingfuting Village | 景福亭村 |
| Fuxi Village | 福溪村 | Baixi Village | 白溪村 |
| Huangsahchong Village | 黄沙冲村 | Huangshachong Village | 黄沙冲村 |
| Huangsahchong Village | 黄沙冲村 | Laowu Village | 老屋村 |
| Shuile Village | 水乐村 | Shuile Village | 水乐村 |
| Shuile Village | 水乐村 | Shuangle Village | 双乐村 |
| Gaochuanling Village | 高船岭村 | Huangtou Village | 黄头村 |
| Gaochuanling Village | 高船岭村 | Gaochuan Village | 高船村 |
| Gaochuanling Village | 高船岭村 | Dajing Village | 大井村 |
| Qingshan Village | 青山村 | Qingshan Village | 青山村 |
| Qingshan Village | 青山村 | Hehua Village | 荷花村 |
| Taiping Village | 太平村 | Longyan Village | 龙岩村 |
| Taiping Village | 太平村 | Yueban Village | 月半村 |
| Hetang Village | 荷塘村 | Yongxing Village | 永兴村 |
| Hetang Village | 荷塘村 | Hetang Village | 荷塘村 |

== Subdivisions ==
Through the amalgamation of villages in 2016, the number of villages was reduced to 20 from 33, the subdistrict of Yingchunting has 4 communities and 22 villages under its jurisdiction.

20 villages

- Baizhushan Village (Chinese: 白竹山村)
- Caoqi Village (Chinese: 曹旗村)
- Dimuyan Village (Chinese: 地母庵村)
- Fengren Village (Chinese: 丰仁村)
- Fuxi Village (Chinese: 福溪村)
- Gaochuanling Village (Chinese: 高船岭村)
- Hetang Village (Chinese: 荷塘村)
- Huangchong Village (Chinese: 黄沙冲村)
- Jinming Village (Chinese: 金明村)
- Litang Village (Chinese: 栗塘村)
- Qiliqiao Village (Chinese: 七里桥村)
- Qingshan Village (Chinese: 青山村)
- Shiyang Village (Chinese: 石羊村)
- Shuangfeng Village (Chinese: 双峰村)
- Shuile Village (Chinese: 水乐村)
- Taiping Village (Chinese: 太平村)
- Tongbao Village (Chinese: 同保村)
- Tuoping Village (Chinese: 托坪村)
- Xindong Village (Chinese: 新东村)
- Xuanyang Village (Chinese: 玄羊村)

4 communities

- Dongta Community (Chinese: 东塔社区)
- Huata Community (Chinese: 花塔社区)
- Wangcheng Community (Chinese: 王城社区)
- Yingchun Community (Chinese: 迎春社区)

== Subdivisions in 2015 ==
In 2015, Toutang Township (Chinese: 头堂乡) was merged to the subdistrict of Yingchunting, the new subdistrict of Yingchunting had 33 villages and 4 communities under its jurisdiction, of which, 4 communities and 2 villages from the former Yingchunting Subdistrict and 31 villages from the former Toutang Township.

2 villages and 4 communities
of the former Yingchunting Subdistrict

- Dongta Community (Chinese: 东塔社区)
- Huata Community (Chinese: 花塔社区)
- Wangcheng Community (Chinese: 王城社区)
- Yingchun Community (Chinese: 迎春社区)
- Fengren Village (Chinese: 丰仁村)
- Xindong Village (Chinese: 新东村)

31 villages
of the former Toutang Township (Chinese: 头堂乡)

- Baixi Village (Chinese: 白溪村)
- Baizhushan Village (Chinese: 白竹山村)
- Caoqi Village (Chinese: 曹旗村)
- Dajing Village (Chinese: 大井村)
- Dimuyan Village (Chinese: 地母庵村)
- Ertang Village (Chinese: 二堂村)
- Gaochuan Village (Chinese: 高船村)
- Hehua Village (Chinese: 荷花村)
- Hetang Village (Chinese: 荷塘村)
- Huangshachong Village (Chinese: 黄沙冲村)
- Huangtou Village (Chinese: 黄头村)
- Huanle Village (Chinese: 双乐村)
- Jiangkou Village (Chinese: 江口村)
- Jingfuting Village (Chinese: 景福亭村)
- Jinming Village (Chinese: 金明村)
- Lanma Village (Chinese: 栏马村)
- Laowu Village (Chinese: 老屋村)
- Litang Village (Chinese: 栗塘村)
- Longyan Village (Chinese: 龙岩村)
- Qiliqiao Village (Chinese: 七里桥村)
- Qingshan Village (Chinese: 青山村)
- Shitouping Village (Chinese: 石头坪村)
- Shiyang Village (Chinese: 石羊村)
- Shuangfeng Village (Chinese: 双峰村)
- Shuile Village (Chinese: 水乐村)
- Tongbao Village (Chinese: 同保村)
- Tuoping Village (Chinese: 托坪村)
- Xiaoshan Village (Chinese: 小山村)
- Xuanyang Village (Chinese: 玄羊村)
- Yongxing Village (Chinese: 永兴村)
- Yueban Village (Chinese: 月半村)
