= Wugang, Hunan =

Wugang 武冈市 Wukang
- County-level city
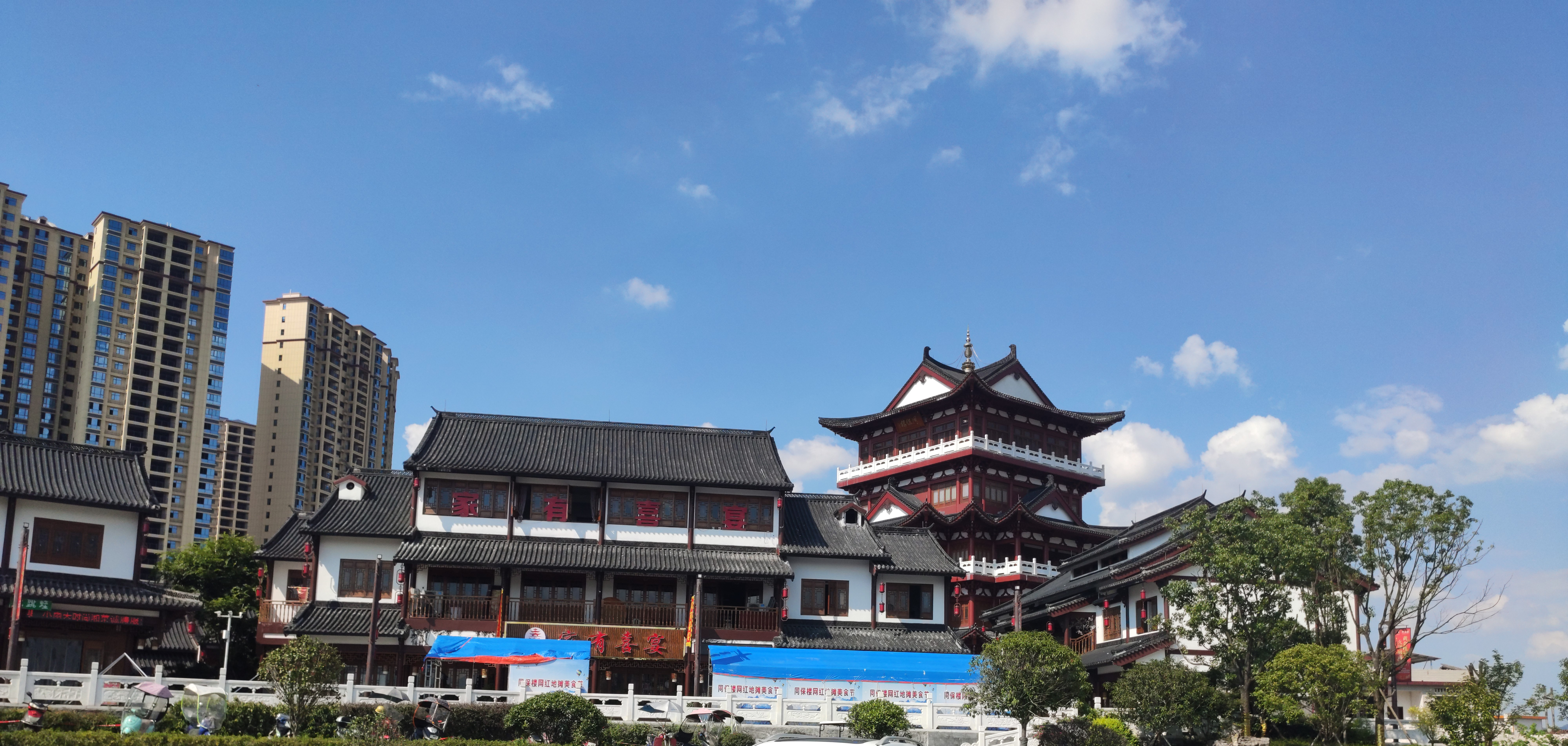
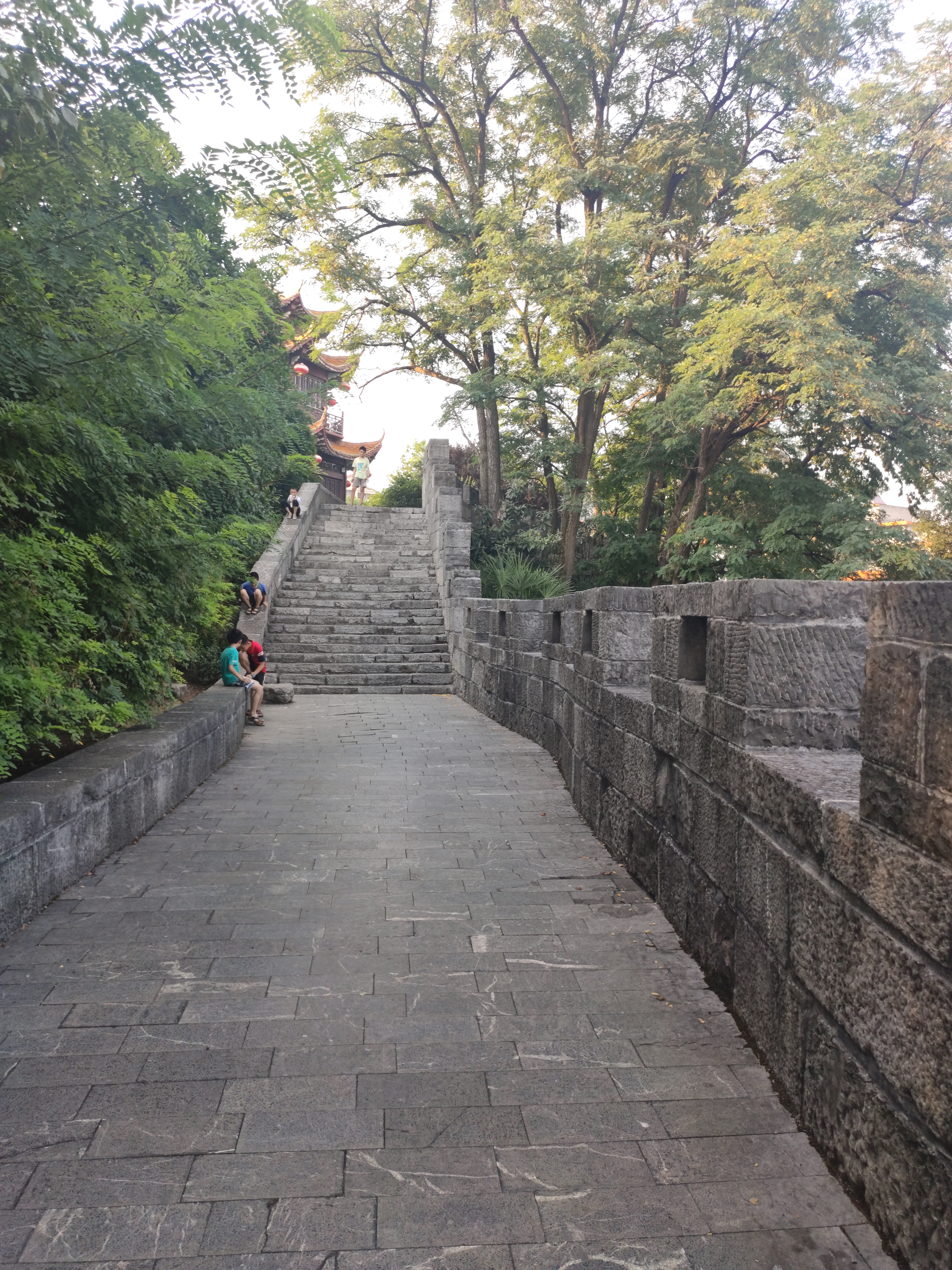
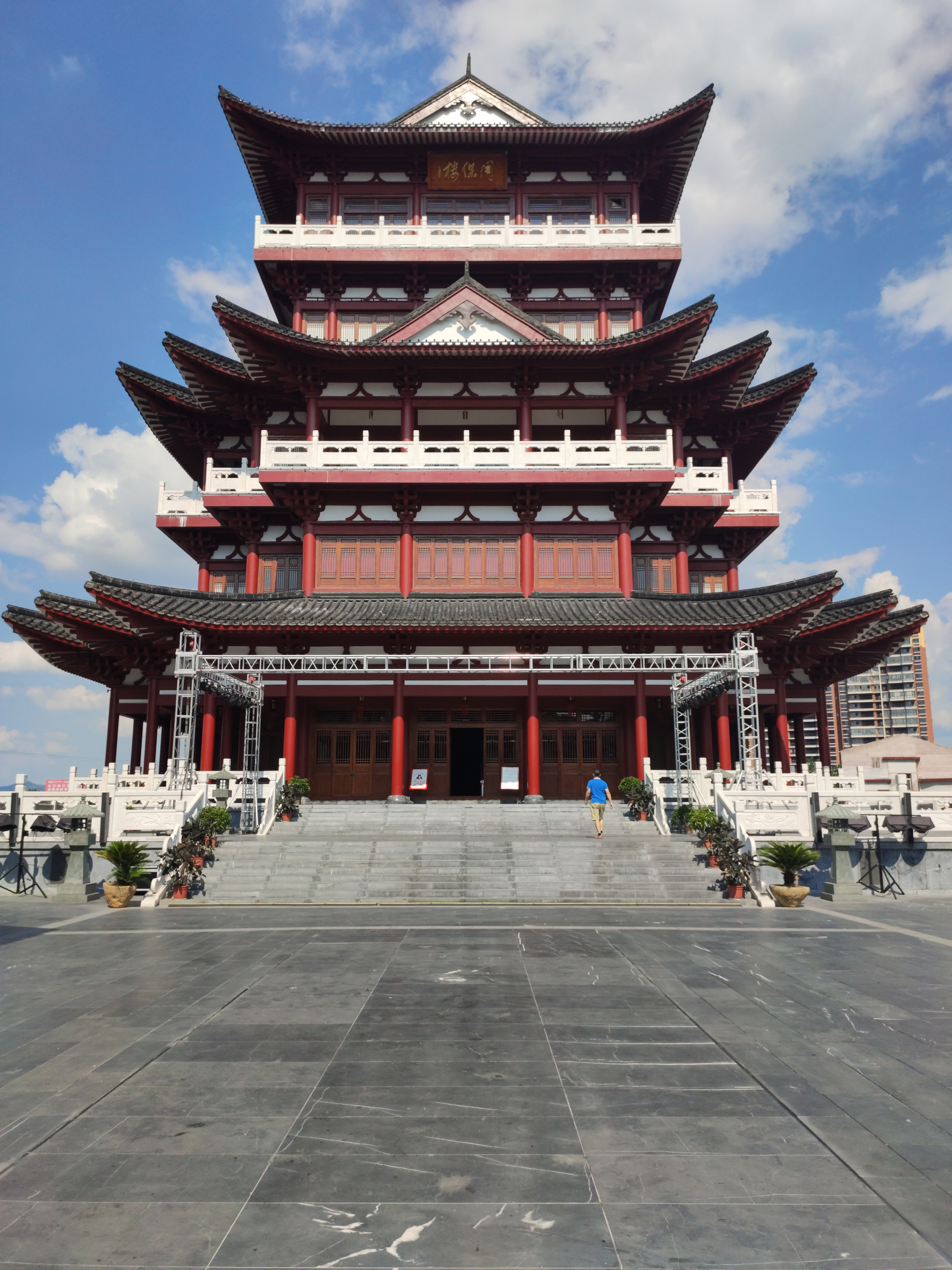
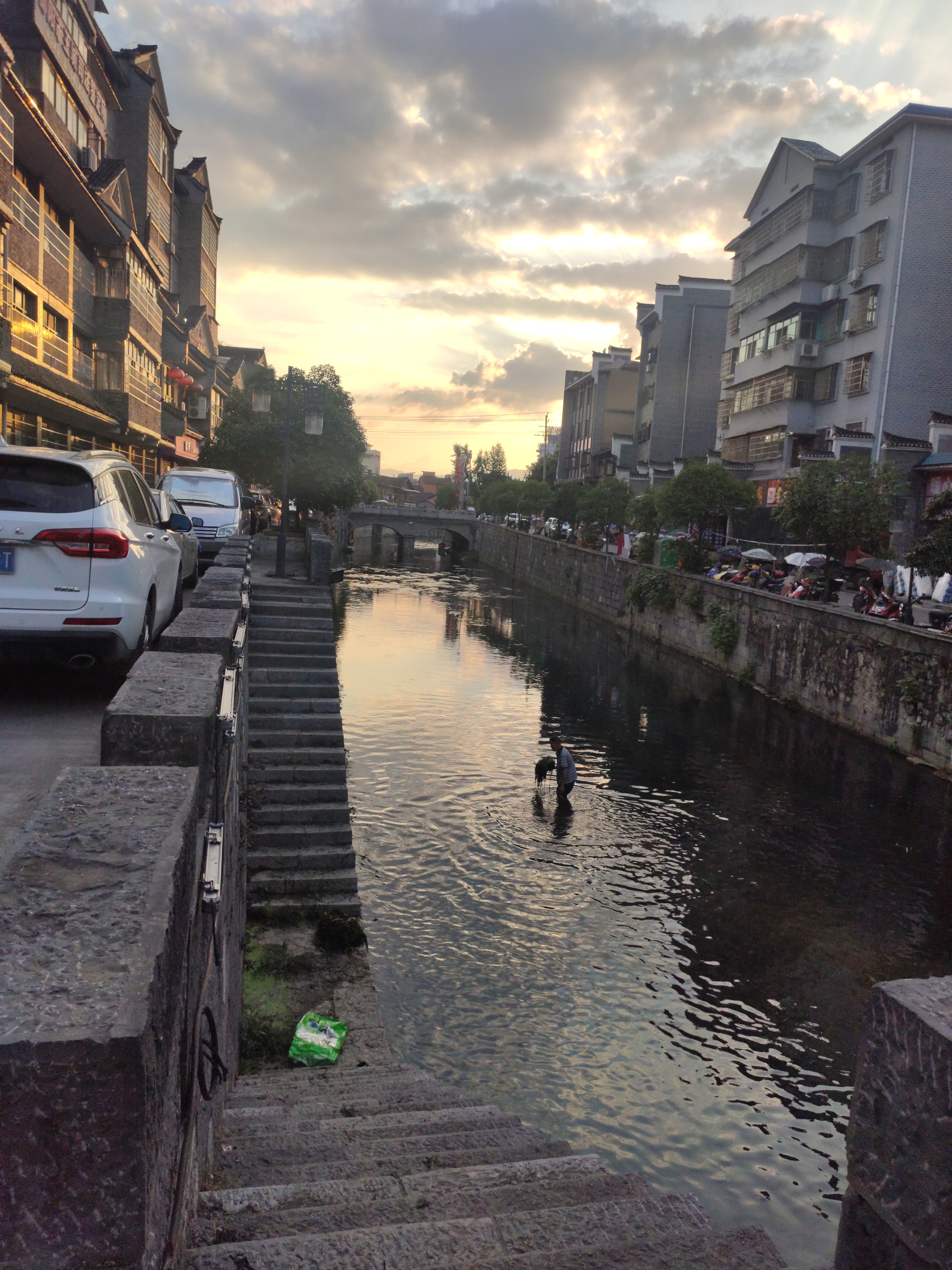
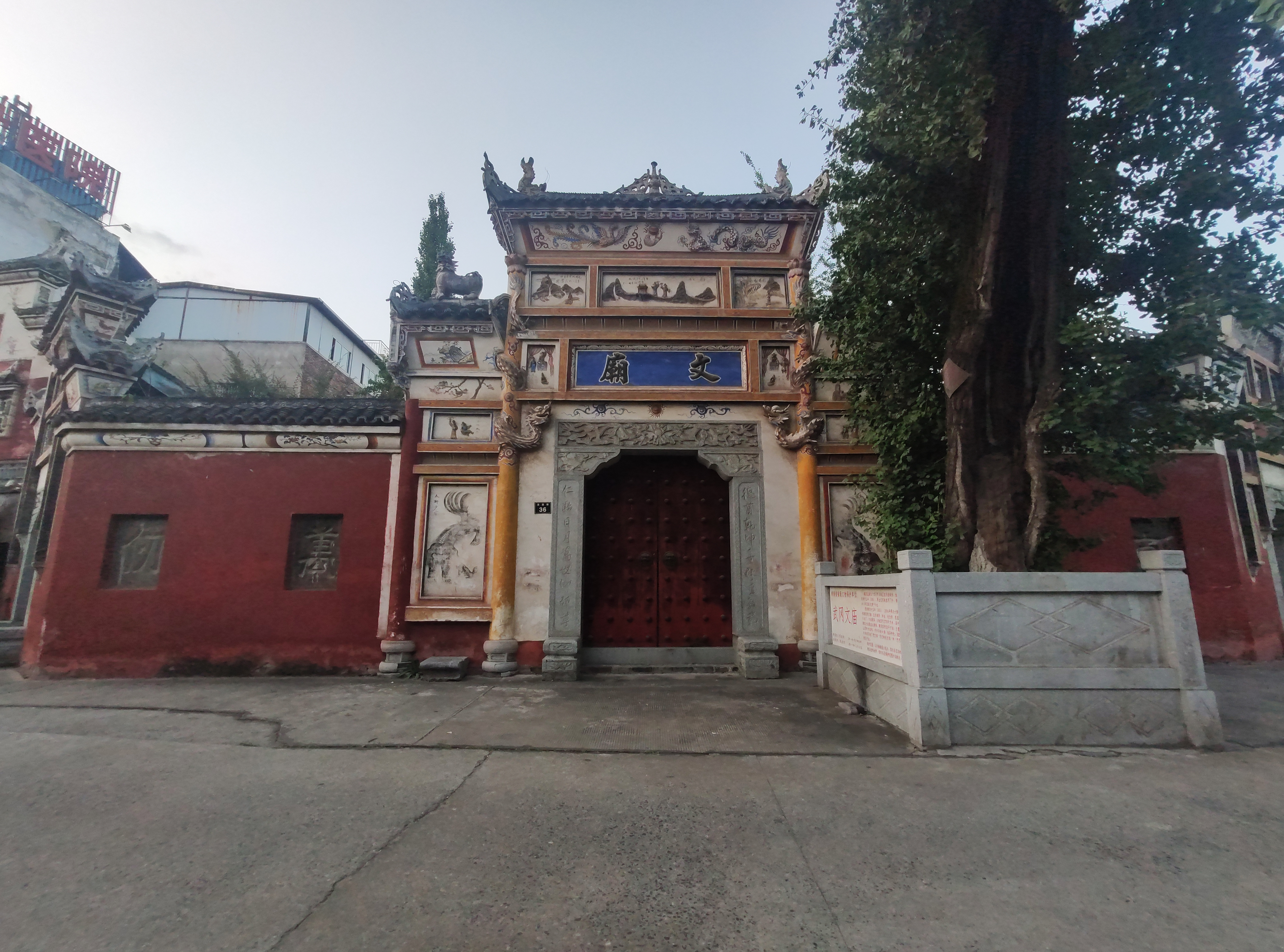
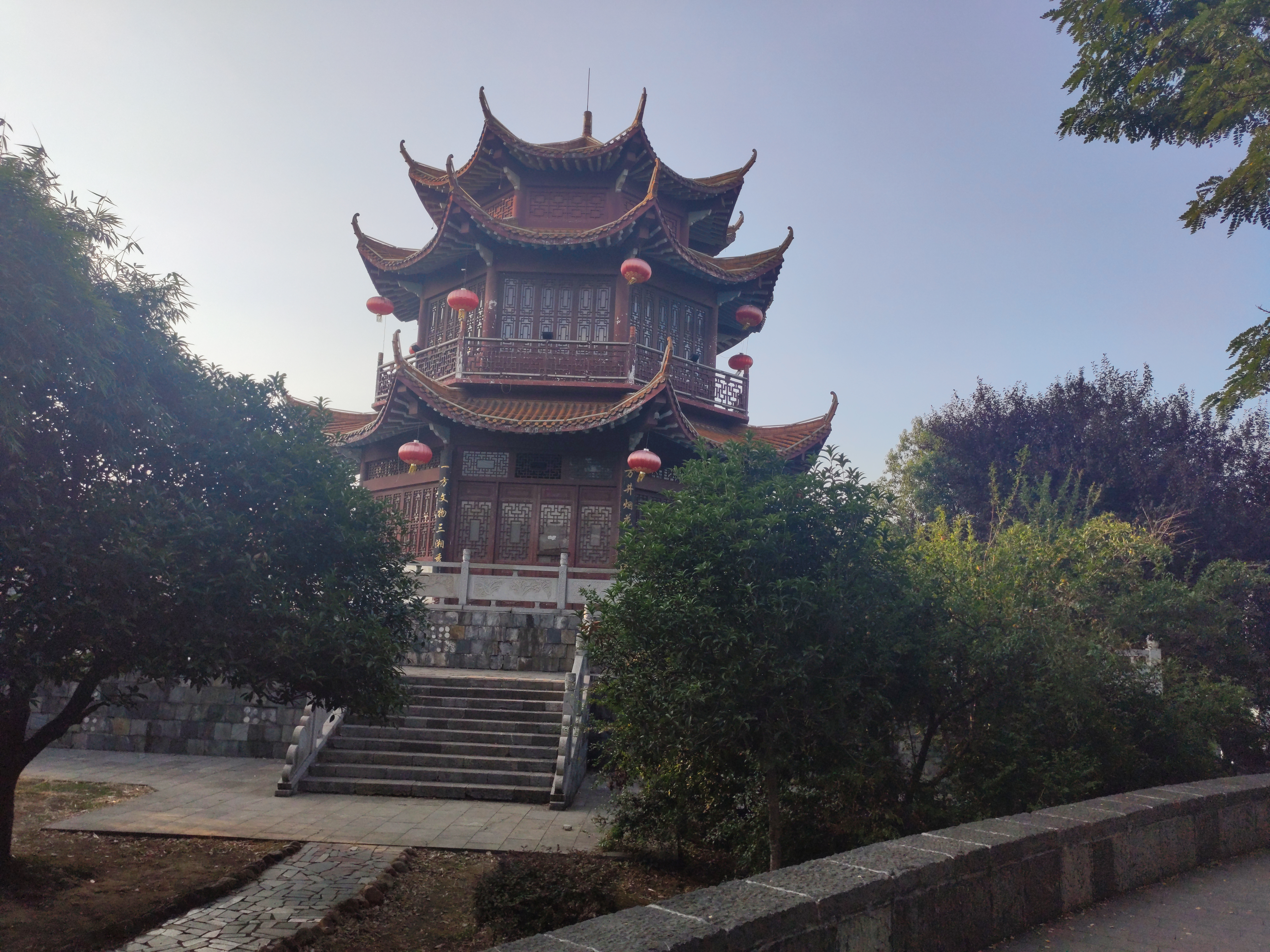
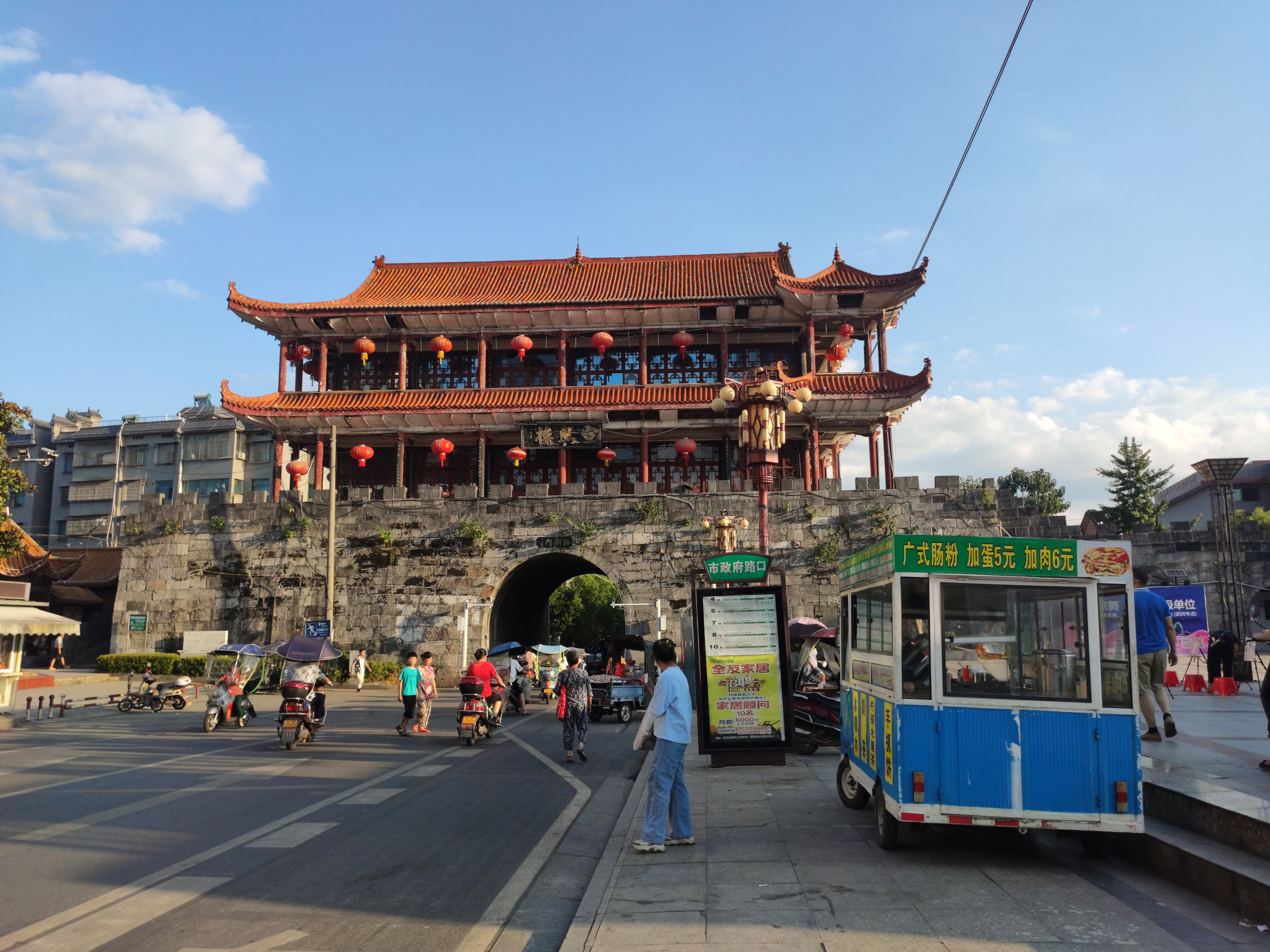
- Tongbao Tower Scenic Area (同保楼景区) Wugang Wall (武冈城墙) Tongbao Tower (同保楼) Qu River (渠水) Wugang Temple of Confucius (武冈文庙) Kuiwen Pavilion (奎文阁) Xuanfeng Gatehouse (宣风楼)

- Location in Hunan
- Coordinates: 26°43′36″N 110°37′55″E
- Country: People's Republic of China
- Province: Hunan
- Prefecture-level city: Shaoyang

Area
  - County-level city: 1,549.0 km^{2} (598.1 sq mi)
  - Urban: 40.00 km^{2} (15.44 sq mi)

Population (2017)
  - County-level city: 843,000
  - Density: 544/km^{2} (1,410/sq mi)
  - Urban: 279,000
- Time zone: UTC+8 (China Standard)
- Postal code: 422400

Wugang (simplified Chinese: 武冈; traditional Chinese: 武岡; pinyin: Wǔgāng) is a county-level city in Hunan Province, China. It is under the administration of Shaoyang prefecture-level city. Located on the southwest of the province and middle of Shaoyang's jurisdiction, the city is bordered to the north by Dongkou and Longhui Counties, to the west by Suining County, to the southwest by Chengbu County, to the southeast by Xinning County, and to the northeast by Shaoyang County. Wugang City covers an area of 1,539 km^{2} (594 sq mi). As of the 2010 census, the city had a registered population of 810,003 and a resident population of 734,870. In 2014, it had a registered population of 834,868 and a resident population of 759,312. The city has four subdistricts, 11 towns and three townships under its jurisdiction, and the government seat is Shuiximen Subdistrict.

== Administrative divisions ==
4 subdistricts

- Faxiangyan (法相岩街道)
- Shuiximen (水西门街道)
- Yingchunting (迎春亭街道)
- Yuanmenkou (辕门口街道)

11 towns

- Choushutang (稠树塘镇)
- Dadian (大甸镇)
- Dengjiapu (邓家铺镇)
- Dengyuantai (邓元泰镇)
- Jingzhupu (荆竹铺镇)
- Longxi (龙溪镇)
- Qinqiao (秦桥镇)
- Shuangpai (双牌镇)
- Simachong (司马冲镇)
- Wantouqiao (湾头桥镇)
- Wenping (文坪镇)

3 townships

- Maping (马坪乡)
- Shuijinping (水浸坪乡)
- Yantian (晏田乡)

== Climate ==
Climate data for Wugang, elevation 341 m (1,119 ft), (1991–2020 normals, extremes 1981–2010)
Month	Jan	Feb	Mar	Apr	May	Jun	Jul	Aug	Sep	Oct	Nov	Dec	Year
Mean daily maximum °C (°F)	8.9 (48.0)	11.6 (52.9)	15.8 (60.4)	22.5 (72.5)	26.7 (80.1)	29.5 (85.1)	32.6 (90.7)	32.0 (89.6)	28.2 (82.8)	22.8 (73.0)	17.7 (63.9)	11.7 (53.1)	21.7 (71.0)
Daily mean °C (°F)	5.6 (42.1)	7.9 (46.2)	11.8 (53.2)	17.8 (64.0)	22.1 (71.8)	25.3 (77.5)	27.7 (81.9)	27.1 (80.8)	23.5 (74.3)	18.4 (65.1)	13.2 (55.8)	7.8 (46.0)	17.4 (63.2)
Mean daily minimum °C (°F)	3.3 (37.9)	5.4 (41.7)	9.0 (48.2)	14.4 (57.9)	18.7 (65.7)	22.3 (72.1)	24.1 (75.4)	23.6 (74.5)	20.2 (68.4)	15.1 (59.2)	9.9 (49.8)	4.9 (40.8)	14.2 (57.6)
Average precipitation mm (inches)	68.7 (2.70)	71.2 (2.80)	128.1 (5.04)	143.2 (5.64)	172.2 (6.78)	193.8 (7.63)	138.2 (5.44)	134.6 (5.30)	81.5 (3.21)	83.0 (3.27)	72.1 (2.84)	55.2 (2.17)	1,341.8 (52.82)
Average snowy days	5.1	2.9	0.9	0	0	0	0	0	0	0	0.2	1.5	10.6
Average relative humidity (%)	80	79	81	78	78	80	75	76	77	76	77	76	78
Mean monthly sunshine hours	52.7	50.9	66.2	98.1	120.5	117.1	199.5	187.8	134.2	112.1	104.4	84.9	1,328.4
Percentage possible sunshine	16	16	18	25	29	28	47	47	37	32	32	26	29
Source: China Meteorological Administration

== Language ==
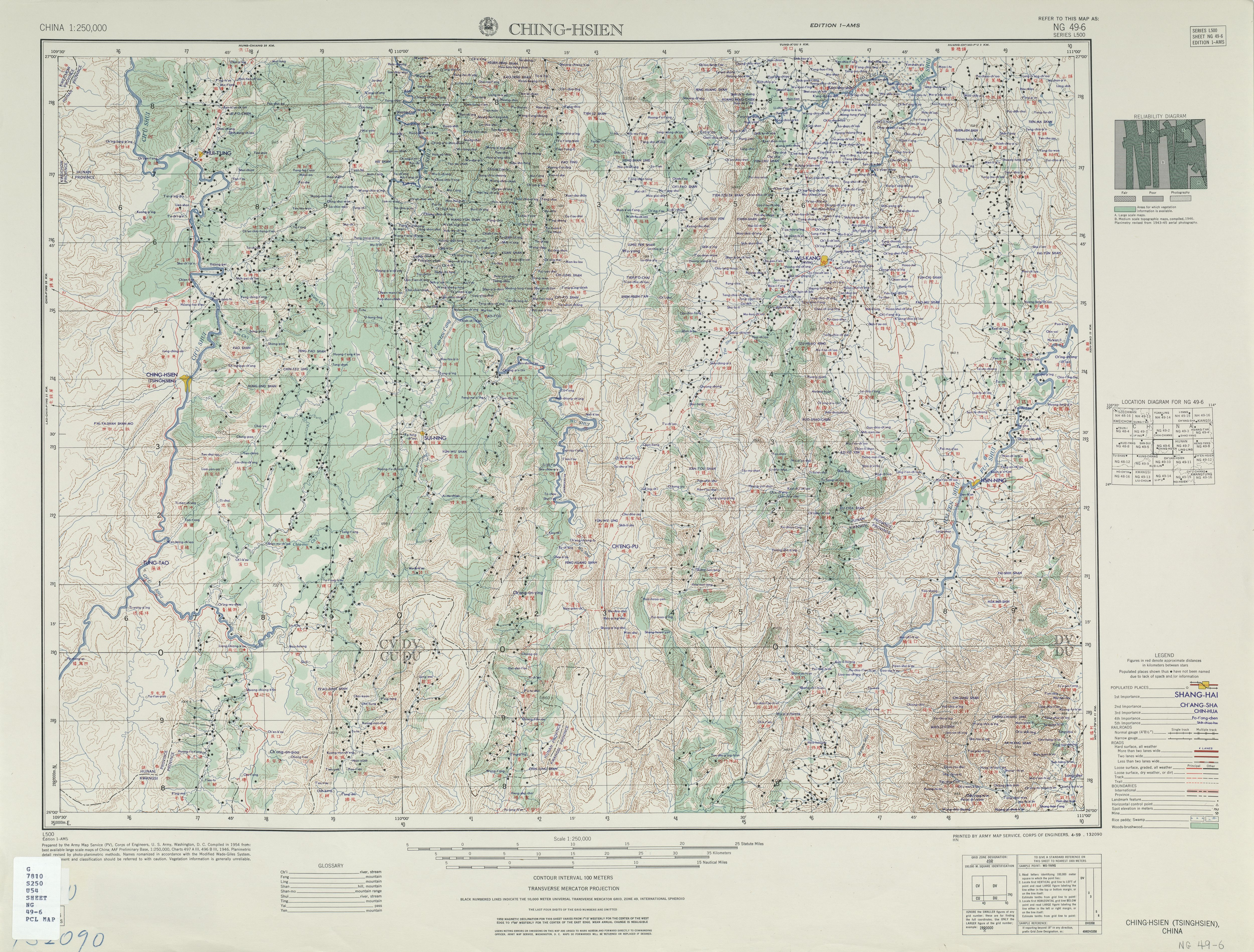
Map including Wugang (labeled as 武岡 WU-KANG (Walled)) (AMS, 1954)

The Wugang dialect belongs to Xiang Chinese language. The minority languages of Miao people and Yao people are also spoken.

== Ethnic groups ==
Wugang is mostly populated by Xiang-speaking people which is a branch of Han-Chinese.

There are also Miao minority and Yao minority living in Wugang. One branch of the Wugang Yao people is known as "Dang" (擋).

== Demographics ==
Wugang has a population of approximately 730,000.
