= Faxiangyan =

Subdistrict of Wugang, Hunan, China

Coordinates: 26.7223290913°N 110.6508661016°E

Faxiangyan (Chinese: 法相岩街道; pinyin: Fǎxiàngyán Jiēdào) is a subdistrict of Wugang City in Hunan, China. It was one of four subdistricts approved to establish in 1994 and officially created in 2011. The subdistrict has an area of 58 km^{2} (22 sq mi) with a population of 55,000 (as of 2015). The subdistrict of Shuiximen has 14 villages and 3 communities under its jurisdiction. Its seat is Nanta Village (Chinese: 南塔村).

== History ==
The subdistrict of Shuiximen was approved to establish from a part of the former Chengguan Town (Chinese: 城关镇) and three villages of Nanta, Xinlong and Dongshan of the former Faxiangyan Township (Chinese: 法相岩乡) in 1994. state owned Wugang Forest Farm (Chinese: 国有武冈林场) was incorporated to the subdistrict. It was officially established on May 18, 2011, and on September 29 of the same year, the government of Wugang City confirmed that the subdistrict had 3 communities and 6 villages under its jurisdiction with an area of 9.586 km^{2} (3.701 sq mi). On December 2, 2015, the township of Anle (Chinese: 安乐乡) was merged to it. The subdistrict had 23 villages and 3 communities with an area of 58 km^{2} (22 sq mi). Through the amalgamation of village-level divisions in 2016, the subdistrict has 14 villages and 3 communities under its jurisdiction.

=== Amalgamation of villages in 2016 ===
Amalgamation of villages in 2016 in 2016
villages		former villages	
English	Chinese	English	Chinese
Chang'an Village	长安村	Anle Village	安乐村
Chang'an Village	长安村	Changchong Village	长冲村
Dejiang Village	德江村	Dejiang Village	德江村
Dejiang Village	德江村	Dongzhuang Village	东庄村
Hongxing Village	红星村	Shuangzhen Village	双圳村
Hongxing Village	红星村	Hongxing Village	红星村
Qingshuiting Village	清水亭村	Qingshuiting Village	清水亭村
Qingshuiting Village	清水亭村	Wugui Village	五桂村
Shuangtian Village	双田村	Tianzhuang Village	田庄村
Shuangtian Village	双田村	Shuangshiqiao Village	双石桥村
Xinglong Village	兴隆村	Xinglong Village	兴隆村
Xinglong Village	兴隆村	Dongshan Village	东山村
Yulong Community	玉龙社区	Yulong Community	玉龙社区
Yulong Community	玉龙社区	Yulong Village	玉龙村
Yulong Community	玉龙社区	Changjieling Village	长界岭村
Zidian Village	紫甸村	Zidian Village	紫甸村
Zidian Village	紫甸村	Tangfu Village	塘富村

== Subdivisions ==
Through the amalgamation of villages in 2016, the number of villages was reduced to 14 from 23, the subdistrict of Shuiximen has 3 communities and 14 villages under its jurisdiction.

14 villages

- Chang'an Village (Chinese: 长安村)
- Chunguang Village (Chinese: 春光村)
- Dejiang Village (Chinese: 德江村)
- Dongting Village (Chinese: 洞庭村)
- Dushan Village (Chinese: 独山村)
- Gaoqiao Village (Chinese: 高桥村)
- Hongxing Village (Chinese: 红星村)
- Nanta Village (Chinese: 南塔村)
- Qingshuiting Village (Chinese: 清水亭村)
- Shuangtian Village (Chinese: 双田村)
- Xinglong Village (Chinese: 兴隆村)
- Xinze Village (Chinese: 新泽村)
- Zhengjiaping Village (Chinese: 郑家坪村)
- Zitian Village (Chinese: 紫田村)

3 communities

- Faxiangyan Community (Chinese: 法相岩社区)
- Tiyun Community (Chinese: 梯云社区)
- Yulong Community (Chinese: 玉龙社区)

== Subdivisions in 2015 ==
In 2015, Anle Township (Chinese: 安乐乡) was merged to the subdistrict of Faxiangyan, the new subdistrict of Shuiximen had 23 villages and 3 communities under it jurisdiction, of which, 3 communities and 6 villages from the former Shuiximen Subdistrict and 17 villages from the former Anle Township.

6 villages and 3 communities
of the former Faxiangyan Subdistrict

- Faxiangyan Community (Chinese: 法相岩社区)
- Tiyun Community (Chinese: 梯云社区)
- Yulong Community (Chinese: 玉龙社区)
- Changjieling Village (Chinese: 长界岭村)
- Dongshan Village (Chinese: 东山村)
- Dongting Village (Chinese: 洞庭村)
- Nanta Village (Chinese: 南塔村)
- Xinglong Village (Chinese: 兴隆村)
- Yulong Village (Chinese: 玉龙村)

17 villages
of Anle Township (Chinese: 安乐乡)

- Anle Village (Chinese: 安乐村)
- Changchong Village (Chinese: 长冲村)
- Chunguang Village (Chinese: 春光村)
- Deyun Village (Chinese: 德江村)
- Dongzhuang Village (Chinese: 东庄村)
- Dushan Village (Chinese: 独山村)
- Gaoqiao Village (Chinese: 高桥村)
- Hongxing Village (Chinese: 红星村)
- Shuangshiqiao Village (Chinese: 双石桥村)
- Shuangyong Village (Chinese: 双圳村)
- Tangfu Village (Chinese: 塘富村)
- Tianzhuang Village (Chinese: 田庄村)
- Wugui Village (Chinese: 五桂村)
- Xiaoshuiting Village (Chinese: 清水亭村)
- Xinze Village (Chinese: 新泽村)
- Zhengjiaping Village (Chinese: 郑家坪村)
- Zitian Village (Chinese: 紫田村)
