= Yuanmenkou =

Subdistrict of Wugang, Hunan, China

Coordinates: 26.721446141°N 110.6317893518°E

Yuanmenkou (Chinese: 辕门口街道; pinyin: Yuánménkǒu Jiēdào) is a subdistrict of Wugang City in Hunan, China. It was one of four subdistricts approved to establish in 1994. The subdistrict has an area of 16.464 km^{2} (6.357 sq mi) with a population of 40,051 (as of 2011). The subdistrict of Yuanshukou has 5 villages and 4 communities under its jurisdiction.

== History ==
The subdistrict of Yuanmenkou was approved to establish from a portion of the former Chengguan Town (Chinese: 城关镇) and four villages of Zinan, Ziyun, Shuiping and Cuiyun of the former Faxiangyan Township (Chinese: 法相岩乡) in 1994. On September 29, 2011, the government of Wugang City confirmed that the subdistrict had 4 communities and 8 villages under its jurisdiction with an area of 16.464 km^{2} (6.357 sq mi).

In 2016, Chengnan Village was formed through the amalgamation of four villages of Ziyun (Chinese: 资云村), Cuiyun (Chinese: 翠云村), Shuiping (Chinese: 水平村) and Santangyuan (Chinese: 三堂院村), and the number of villages were reduced to 5 from 9. It has 5 villages and 4 communities under its jurisdiction.

== Subdivisions ==
Through the amalgamation of villages in 2016, the number of villages was reduced to 5 from 8. The subdistrict of Yuanmenkou has 4 communities and 5 villages under its jurisdiction.

5 villages

- Chengnan Village (Chinese: 城南村)
- Gexin Village (Chinese: 革新村)
- Gushan Village (Chinese: 古山村)
- Luozipu Village (Chinese: 落子铺村)
- Zinan Village (Chinese: 资南村)

4 communities

- Aoshan Community (Chinese: 鳌山社区)
- Shipaifang Community (Chinese: 石牌坊社区)
- Shuiyun Community (Chinese: 水云社区)
- Zaoximen Community (Chinese: 旱西门社区)
