= Shuiximen =

Subdistrict of Wugang, Hunan, China

Coordinates: 26.7388783459°N 110.6194874230°E

Shuiximen (Chinese: 水西门街道; pinyin: Shuǐxīmén Jiēdào) is a subdistrict and the seat of Wugang City in Hunan, China. It was one of four subdistricts approved to establish in 1994 and officially created in 2011. The subdistrict has an area of 83.1 km^{2} (32.1 sq mi) with a population of 64,000 (as of 2015). The subdistrict of Shuiximen has 14 villages and 5 communities under its jurisdiction. Its seat is Desheng Village (Chinese: 得胜村).

== History ==
The subdistrict of Shuiximen was approved to establish from a part of the former Chengguan Town (Chinese: 城关镇), Qingfeng Village of Chengdong Township (Chinese: 城东乡) and two villages of Futian and Xinguang of Chengxi Township (Chinese: 城西乡) in 1994. It was officially established on May 18, 2011, and on September 29 of the same year, the government of Wugang City confirmed that the subdistrict had 5 communities and 3 villages under its jurisdiction with an area of 7.864 km^{2} (3.036 sq mi). On December 2, 2015, the township of Longtian (Chinese: 龙田乡) was merged to it. The subdistrict had 21 villages and 5 communities with an area of 83.1 km^{2} (32.1 sq mi). Through the amalgamation of village-level divisions in 2016, the subdistrict has 14 villages and 5 communities under its jurisdiction.

=== Amalgamation of villages in 2016 ===
Amalgamation of villages in 2016 in 2016
villages		former villages	
English	Chinese	English	Chinese
Jiandao Village	枧道村	Shixiang Village	石巷村
Jiandao Village	枧道村	Jiandao Village	枧道村
Longtian Village	龙田村	Longtian Village	龙田村
Longtian Village	龙田村	Xi‘an Village	西安村
Luowei Village	罗伟村	Longjing Village	龙井村
Luowei Village	罗伟村	Luowei Village	罗伟村
Puling Community	普岭社区	Puling Community	普岭社区
Puling Community	普岭社区	Qingfeng Village	庆丰村
Tangling Village	塘岭村	Changling Village	长岭村
Tangling Village	塘岭村	Changtang Village	长塘村
Taohua Village	桃花村	Baoyuan Village	保元村
Taohua Village	桃花村	Taohua Village	桃花村
Yongtai Village	永太村	Yongxiang Village	永享村
Yongtai Village	永太村	Taiping Village	太平村

== Subdivisions ==
Through the amalgamation of villages in 2016, the number of villages was reduced to 14 from 21, the subdistrict of Shuiximen has 5 communities and 14 villages under its jurisdiction.

14 villages

- Desheng Village (Chinese: 得胜村)
- Futian Village (Chinese: 富田村)
- Jiandao Village (Chinese: 枧道村)
- Liren Village (Chinese: 里仁村)
- Longtian Village (Chinese: 龙田村)
- Luowei Village (Chinese: 罗伟村)
- Ma'an Village (Chinese: 马安村)
- Shuitai Village (Chinese: 永太村)
- Tangling Village (Chinese: 塘岭村)
- Taohua Village (Chinese: 桃花村)
- Wanquan Village (Chinese: 万全村)
- Xinguang Village (Chinese: 新光村)
- Xinhe Village (Chinese: 新和村)
- Yuping Village (Chinese: 玉屏村)

5 communities

- Dapaotai Community (Chinese: 大炮台社区)
- Puling Community (Chinese: 普岭社区)
- Shuiximen Community (Chinese: 水西门社区)
- Taokan Community (Chinese: 陶侃社区)
- Zhushan Community (Chinese: 竹山社区)

== Subdivisions in 2015 ==
In 2015, Longtian Township (Chinese: 龙田乡) was merged to the subdistrict of Shuiximen, the new subdistrict of Shuiximen had 21 villages and 5 communities under it jurisdiction, of which, 5 communities and 3 villages from the former Shuiximen Subdistrict and 18 villages from Longtian Township.

18 villages from the former
township of Longtian (Chinese: 龙田乡)

- Baojia Village (Chinese: 保元村)
- Changling Village (Chinese: 长岭村)
- Changtang Village (Chinese: 长塘村)
- Desheng Village (Chinese: 得胜村)
- Jiandao Village (Chinese: 枧道村)
- Liren Village (Chinese: 里仁村)
- Longjing Village (Chinese: 龙井村)
- Longtian Village (Chinese: 龙田村)
- Luosheng Village (Chinese: 罗伟村)
- Ma'an Village (Chinese: 马安村)
- Shixiang Village (Chinese: 石巷村)
- Taiping Village (Chinese: 太平村)
- Taohua Village (Chinese: 桃花村)
- Wanquan Village (Chinese: 万全村)
- Xi'an Village (Chinese: 西安村)
- Xinhe Village (Chinese: 新和村)
- Yongxiang Village (Chinese: 永享村)
- Yuping Village (Chinese: 玉屏村)

3 villages and 5 communities from
the former subdistrict of Shuiximen

- Futian Village (Chinese: 富田村)
- Qingfeng Village (Chinese: 庆丰村)
- Xinguang Village (Chinese: 新光村)
- Dapaotai Community (Chinese: 大炮台社区)
- Puling Community (Chinese: 普岭社区)
- Shuixmen Community (Chinese: 水西门社区)
- Taokan Community (Chinese: 陶侃社区)
- Zhushan Community (Chinese: 竹山社区)
