= Tujia language =

Sino-Tibetan language spoken in China

Tujia
- Bifzixsar; Mongrzzirhof
- Pronunciation: /pi35 ʦi55 sa21/ /mõ21 ʣi21 ho35/
- Native to: Northwestern Hunan Province, China; Laifeng County, Hubei
- Ethnicity: 8.0 million Tujia (2000 census)
- Native speakers: 70,000 (2005)
- Language family: Sino-Tibetan: (unclassified); Tujia

Language codes
- ISO 639-3: Either: tji – Northern tjs – Southern
- Glottolog: tuji1244

The Tujia language (Northern Tujia: Bifzixsar, /pi35 ʦi55 sa21/; Southern Tujia: Mongrzzirhof, /mõ21 ʣi21 ho35/; simplified Chinese: 土家语; traditional Chinese: 土家語; pinyin: Tǔjiāyǔ) is a Sino-Tibetan language spoken natively by the Tujia people in Hunan Province, China. It is unclassified within the Sino-Tibetan language family, due to pervasive influence from neighboring languages. There are two mutually unintelligible variants, Northern and Southern. Both variants are tonal languages with the tone contours of /˥ ˥˧ ˧˥ ˨˩/ (55, 53, 35, 21). Northern Tujia has 21 initials, whereas Southern Tujia has 26 (with 5 additional voiced initials). As for the finals, Northern Tujia has 25 and Southern Tujia has 30, 12 of which are used exclusively in loanwords from Chinese. Its verbs make a distinction of active and passive voices. Its pronouns distinguish the singular and plural numbers along with the basic and possessive cases. As of 2005, the number of speakers was estimated at 70,000 for Northern Tujia (of which about 100 are monolingual) and 1,500 for Southern Tujia, out of an ethnic population of 8 million.

== Names ==
Tujia autonyms include /pi35 tsi55 kʰa21/ (毕孜卡; /pi21 tsi21 kʰa21/ in Ye 1995) and /mi35 tɕi55 kʰa33/55/. The Tujia people call their language /pi35 tsi55 sa21/.

Tujia (土家) literally means 'native people', which is the appellation that the Han Chinese had given to them due to their aboriginal status in the area. The Tujia, on the other hand, call the Han Chinese Kejia (客家), a designation also given to the Hakka people, which means 'guest people'. Tujia is also called "Bizic" by Yulou Zhou.

== Classification ==
Tujia is clearly a Sino-Tibetan language, with a number of scholars consider the Tujia languages as belonging to a separate sub-branch of Tibeto-Burman languages, but its position within that family is unclear, due to massive borrowing from other Sino-Tibetan languages, in particular loanwords from Chinese. Although it has been placed with other groups in the past, such as under Nuosu language or belongs to the branch of Qiang language, linguists now generally leave it unclassified.

== Subdivisions ==
Tujia can be divided into two different languages: Northern Tujia and Southern Tujia, which have 40% lexical similarity with each other. Almost all Tujia speakers are located in Xiangxi Tujia and Miao Autonomous Prefecture. The Northern dialect has the vast majority of speakers, while the Southern dialect is spoken in only 3 villages of Tanxi Township (潭溪镇) in Luxi County.

- Northern (Biji 毕基): Baojing County, Longshan County, Guzhang County, Yongshun County
  - Hushi (互士语)
  - Xia (虾语)
  - Shasha (沙沙语)
- Southern (Mengzi 孟兹): Tanxi Township in Luxi County

The Tujia-speaking areas of Longshan County are mostly located around the Xiche River 洗车河. The variety studied by Tian (1986) is that of Dianfang Township 靛房乡, Longshan County. Ye focuses on the Northern variety of Xinghuo Village 星火村, Miao'ertan Township 苗儿滩镇 (formerly Miaoshi 苗市), Longshan County 龙山县. Peng covers the Northern variety of Yongshun County. Brassett based their Tujia data primarily on the variety of Tasha Township 他砂乡, Longshan County and also partly from Pojiao Township 坡脚乡 and Dianfang Township 靛房乡. Dai focuses on the variety of Xianren Township 仙仁乡, Baojing County. Zhang (2006) covers the Northern Tujia dialect of Duogu village 多谷村, Longshan County and the Southern Tujia dialect of Poluozhai 婆落寨, Luxi County.

=== Chen (2006) ===
Chen Kang divides Tujia as follows.

- Tujia
  - Northern
    - Longshan dialect 龙山土语 (autonym: pi^{35}tsi^{55} kʰa^{21} or Bifzivkar) – spoken in:
      - Longshan County: Jiashi 贾市, Zan'guo 咱果, Miaoshi 苗市, Pojiao 坡脚, Mengxi 猛西, Tasha 他砂, Shuiba 水坝, Guanping 官平, Neixi 内溪, Ganxi 干溪, Dianfang 靛房
      - Laifeng County, Hubei: Maodong 卯洞
      - Yongshun County: Shaoha 勺哈, Liexi 列夕, Duishan 对山, Gaoping 高坪, Taiping 太平
      - Guzhang County: Qietong 茄通, Tianjiadong 田家洞
    - Baojing dialect 保靖土语 (autonym: mi^{35}tɕi^{55} kʰa^{21} or Mifqivkar) – spoken in:
      - Baojing County: Bamao 拔茅, Bi'er 比耳, Mawang 马王, Angdong 昂洞
      - Longshan County: Yanchong 岩冲
  - Southern – spoken in the following villages of Tanxi Township 潭溪乡, Luxi County:
    - Xiadu 下都 (Tujia: tsʰie^{21} bu^{21} or Cirbur)
    - Puzhu 铺竹 (Tujia: pʰu^{33} dzɯ^{33} or Puzzu)
    - Boluozhai 波洛寨 (Tujia: bo^{33} lo^{33} tsai^{13} or Bolozaif)
    - Qieji 且己 (Tujia: tsʰa^{33} dʑi^{35} or Ciejif)
    - Xiaqieji 下且己 (Tujia: tsʰa^{33} dʑi^{35} a^{21} di^{35} or Ciajifafdif)
    - Daboliu 大波流 (Tujia: tsʰie^{21} dɯ^{55} pʰo^{21} or Cierduovpor)
    - Xiaolingzhai 小零寨 (Tujia: tsʰie^{55} ȵĩ^{35} sa^{33} or Ciernifsa)
    - Limuzhai 梨木寨 (Tujia: li^{21} mu^{21} tsai^{13} or Livmuvzaif)
    - Tumazhai 土麻寨 (Tujia: tʰɯ^{13} ma^{21} tsai^{13} or Tufmavzaiv)
    - Tanxi Town 潭溪镇 (Tujia: hu^{33} dɯ^{33} or Huduo)

=== Yang (2011) ===
Yang Zaibiao reports that Tujia is spoken in over 500 natural villages comprising about 200 administrative villages and 34 townships. The Northern Tujia autonym is pi35 tsɿ55 kʰa21, and the Southern Tujia autonym is mõ21 dzɿ21. Yang covers the two Northern Tujia dialects of Dianfang 靛房 and Xiaolongre 小龙热, and the Southern Tujia dialect of Qieji 且己.

- Longshan County (southeastern; 15 townships): Xichehe 洗车河镇, Longtou 隆头镇, Miao'ertan 苗儿滩镇, Dianfang 靛房镇, Luota 洛塔乡, Ganxi 干溪乡, Mengxi 猛西乡, Fengxi 凤溪镇, Pojiao 坡脚乡, Tasha 他砂乡, Neixi 内溪乡, Jiashi 贾市乡, Yanchong 岩冲乡, Changxi 长潭乡, Liye 里耶镇
- Yongshun County (western; 5 townships): Duishan 对山乡, Heping 和平乡, Xiqi 西歧乡, Shouche 首车镇, Shaoha 勺哈乡
- Baojing County (western and southeastern; 10 townships):
  - Western Baojing County: Longtou 隆头乡, Bi'er 比耳乡, Mawang 马王乡, Bamao 拔茅镇, Purong 普戎镇, Angdong 昂洞乡, Longxi 龙溪乡, Boji 簸箕乡
  - Southeastern Baojing County: Tuzha 涂乍乡, Xianren 仙人乡
- Guzhang County (northwestern; 2 townships): Qietong 茄通 (including in Xiaolongre 小龙热村 ɕiao55 lũ21 ze55), Duanlong 断龙乡
- Luxi County (1 township): Tanxi 潭溪镇 (including in Qieji 且己村 tsʰa33 dʑi35 / tsʰe5533 dʑi21)
- Laifeng County (1 township): Hedong 河东乡

== Phonology ==
=== Consonants ===
The following are the consonants in both the Northern and Southern Tujia dialects:

		Labial	Alveolar	Post- alveolar	Velar
Plosive	voiceless	p	t		k
Plosive	aspirated	pʰ	tʰ		kʰ
Plosive	voiced^{1}	b	d		ɡ
Affricate	voiceless		ts	tɕ	
Affricate	aspirated		tsʰ	tɕʰ	
Affricate	voiced^{1}		dz	dʑ	
Fricative	voiceless	f^{1}	s	ɕ	x^{4}
Fricative	voiced		z		ɣ
Nasal		m	n^{2}	ɲ^{3}	ŋ
Approximant		w	l^{2}	j	

1. Voiced plosives and affricates, and /f/ occur only in the Southern Tujia dialects.
2. [n] and [l] are in free variation.
3. [ɲ] is an allophone of /n/.
4. /x/ has allophones [ç] before /i/ and [ɸ] before /u/.

=== Vowels ===
	Front		Central		Back	
Close	i	y	ɨ	ʉ	u	
Close-mid	e				ɤ	o
Open-mid					ɔ	
Open			a			

Vowels/Combinations in the Tujia dialects
		Oral								Nasal							
Medial		∅	i	ʉ	e	a	o	u	coda	∅	e	æ	a	u	n	ŋ	coda
Nucleus	∅											æ̃			ɛn	ɜŋ	
Nucleus	Vowel	i		iaʉ	ie	ia	io	iu	iɛ	ĩ		iæ̃	iã	iũ	iɛn	iŋ	
Nucleus	Vowel	y	yei		ye	ya					yẽ	yæ̃					
Nucleus	Vowel	ɨ	ɨi		ɨe			ɨu									
Nucleus	Vowel	ʉ															
Nucleus	Vowel	a	ai	aʉ				au	iau	ã						aŋ	
Nucleus	Vowel	e	ei							ẽ							
Nucleus	Vowel	ɔ							uɔ							ɔŋ	iɔŋ
Nucleus	Vowel	o		oʉ				ou	ioʉ								
Nucleus	Vowel	ɤ															
Nucleus	Vowel	u	uei		ue	ua	uo		uai	ũ	uẽ	uæ̃	uã		un		uɛn

- Combinations with oral vowels /y ʉ/ and nasal vowel /æ̃/ occur only in the Southern dialects.
- Combinations with vowels /ɛ ɜ ɤ ɔ/ and coda /n/ occur only in the Northern dialects.

== Orthography ==
=== 1983 experiment ===
One system of writing Tujia in Latin script is based on Hanyu Pinyin and uses letters as tone markers, namely, x, r, v, f. It was used in some schools in the area as an experiment, but withdrawn from them in the mid-1990s when the funding ceased.

=== Brassett, Brassett, & Lu (2006) ===
Philip Brassett, Cecilia Brassett and Lu Meiyan have proposed an experimental Pinyin orthography for the Tujia language, as follows:

Tujia Pinyin Consonants
Symbol	IPA	Symbol	IPA
b	p	ng	ŋ
c	tsʰ	p	pʰ
d	t	q	tɕʰ
g	k	r	z
h	x	s	s
hh	ɣ	t	tʰ
j	tɕ	w	w
k	kʰ	x	ɕ
l	l, n	y	j
m	m	z	ts
n	ɲ, n		

Tujia Pinyin Vowels
Symbol	IPA	Symbol	IPA
a	a	ing	iŋ
ai	ai	iong	iɔŋ
an	ɛn	iu	iu
ang	aŋ	o	ɔ
ao	au	ong	ɔŋ
e	ɤ	ou	ou
ei	ei	u	u
eng	ɜŋ	ua	ua
i	i, ɨ	uai	uai
ia	ia	uan	uɛn
ian	iɛn	ui	uei
iao	iau	un	un
ie	iɛ	uo	uɔ

Tujia Pinyin Tones
Symbol	Pitch	Name of tone	Letters
1	˥ or ˦	High level	-v
2	˨˦ or ˧˥	Low rising	-f
3	˨˩	Low falling	-r
4	˥˩ or ˥˧	High falling	-x

=== Tujia numerals ===
Tujia Pinyin Tones
Number	Tujia words (with tone letters)
1	La
2	Niev
3	Sov
4	Riev
5	Uv
6	Wor
7	Nier
8	Yer
9	Kiev
10	Laxiv

== Language preservation ==
Although only a small percentage of Tujia people speak the Tujia language, Tujia language enthusiasts work hard on to preserve it, both in Hunan and Hubei. According to news reports, two Tujia language instruction books have been published and work continues on a Tujia dictionary. The Tujia language scholar Chu Yongming (储永明) works with children at the Baifusi Ethnic Minorities School (百福司民族小学) in Baifusi Town, Laifeng County, Hubei to promote the language use.

== Bibliography ==
- Brassett, Philip; Brassett, Cecilia; Lu, Meiyan (2006). The Tujia language. Languages of the World/Materials. Vol. 455. Munich: Lincom Europa. ISBN 9783895869952.
- Chen, Kang [陈康] (2006). 土家语研究 [A Study of Tujia]. Beijing: Minzu University.
- Dai, Qinxia [戴庆厦] (2005). 仙仁土家语研究 [A Study of Xianren Tujia]. Beijing: Minzu University.
- Peng, Bo [彭勃] (1998). 土家语研究及实录 [Tujiayu yanjiu ji shilu]. Yongshun County Ethnic Affairs Bureau [永顺县民族事务委员会].
- Tian, Desheng [田德生] (1986). 土家语简志 [A sketch of Tujia]. Beijing: Publishing House of Minority Nationalities.
- Ye, Deshu [叶德书] (1995). 土家语研究 [A Study of Tujia]. Jishou: Jishou University Xiang-Chu Culture Research Institute 吉首大学湘楚文化研究所.
- Yang, Zaibiao [杨再彪] (2011). 湖南西部四种濒危语言调查] [Four endangered languages of Hunan province]. Beijing: Publishing House of Minority Nationalities.
- Yao, Yuanshen [姚元森] (2013). 母语存留区龙山坡脚的土家语口语 [Muyu cunliuqu Longshan Pojiao de Tujiayu kouyu]. Beijing: Publishing House of Minority Nationalities.
- Xiang, Kuiyi [向魁益] (2012). 保靖县土家语实录 [Baojing Tujiayu shilu]. Hunan Normal University Press [湖南师范大学出版社].
- Zhang, Jun [张军] (2006). 土家语语音硏究 [Phonological study of the Tujia language] (Ph.D. dissertation). Hong Kong University of Science and Technology. hdl:1783.1/2836.
