= Qianzhou =

Qianzhou may refer to:

- Qianzhou (in modern Jiangxi) (虔州)
- Qianzhou (in modern Chongqing and Guizhou) (黔州)
- Qianzhou (in modern Liaoning) (黔州)

== Chinese subdistricts ==
- Qianzhou Subdistrict, Wuxi (前洲街道), a subdistrict of Huishan District (惠山区), Wuxi City, Jiangsu Province.
- Qianzhou, Jishou (乾州街道), a subdistrict of Jishou City, Hunan Province.
