= Min'an =

Subdistrict of Longshan, Hunan, China

Min'an 民安街道
- Subdistrict
- Location in Hunan
- Coordinates: 29°26′52″N 109°25′53″E
- Country: People's Republic of China
- Province: Hunan
- Autonomous prefecture: Xiangxi
- County: Longshan County
- Time zone: UTC+8 (China Standard)

Min'an (Chinese: 民安街道; pinyin: Mínān Jiēdào) is a subdistrict and the county seat of Longshan in Hunan, China. The subdistrict is located in the northwest of the county, it is bordered by Laifeng County of Hubei province to the west, Huatang and Xinglong Subdistricts to the north and Xiluo Town to the east and south. It has an area of 43 km^{2} (17 sq mi) with a population of 86,600 (as of 2015). The seat of local government is at Xiang'e Rd.(Chinese: 湘鄂路).

== See also ==
- List of township-level divisions of Hunan
