= Qianling =

Qianling may refer to:

- Qianling Mausoleum (乾陵), tomb of Emperor Gaozong of Tang and Empress Wu Zetian, in Shaanxi, China
- Qianling Mountain (黔灵山), in Guiyang, Guizhou, China
- Qianling, Baojing (迁陵镇), town and county seat of Baojing County, Hunan, China.
