= Huayuan Town =

Town in Hunan, China

Coordinates: 28°34′58″N 109°28′07″E

Huayuan Town (Chinese: 花垣镇; pinyin: Huāyuán Zhèn) is a town and the county seat of Huayuan County in Hunan, China.

The town is located in the northeast of the county, it is bordered by Changle Township (Chinese: 长乐乡) to the west and Baojing County to the north, Biancheng Town (Chinese: 边城镇) to the west, Longtan Town (Chinese: 龙潭镇), Shilan Town (Chinese: 石栏镇), Malichang Town (Chinese: 麻栗场镇) and Shuanglong Town (Chinese: 双龙镇) to the south. It has an area of 201.2 km^{2} (77.7 sq mi) with a population, at the end of 2015, of 103,000. The seat is at Jianshezhonglu Rd.(Chinese: 建设中路).
