= Nongche =

Town in Hunan, China

Nongche 农车镇
- Town
- Location in Hunan
- Coordinates: 29°14′N 109°39′E
- Country: People's Republic of China
- Province: Hunan
- Autonomous prefecture: Xiangxi
- County: Longshan County
- Time zone: UTC+8 (China Standard)

Nongche (Chinese: 农车; pinyin: Nóngchē) is a small town in the north west Hunan province of China.

== See also ==
- List of township-level divisions of Hunan
