= 2014 Hunan military training incident =

2014 military controversy in China

On August 24, 2014, an incident between students and teachers took place during a military training event at Huangcang Secondary School (simplified Chinese: 皇仓中学; traditional Chinese: 皇倉中學; pinyin: Huángcāng Zhōngxué) in Longshan County, Xiangxi Tujia and Miao Autonomous Prefecture, Hunan, China.

In China mandatory military training is done in several educational institutes with first year students at the start of each school year. In the morning an incident involving 10th grade students seemed to be resolved amicably, but in the afternoon the instructors began showing aggression towards the students who were involved, prompting criticism from Mr. Liu, the students' teacher, towards the military training instructors. A fight broke out and 40 students, a teacher, and a military training instructor received injuries. 22 people were still hospitalized as of Tuesday, August 26.

By August 28, 2014, there were 14,000 forwardings of the story on Sina Weibo.
