= Qianzhou, Jishou =

Subdistrict of Jishou City, Hunan, China

Coordinates: 28.25621°N 109.69112°E

Qianzhou 乾州街道
- Subdistrict
- Interactive map of Qianzhou
- Country: China
- Province: Hunan
- Autonomous prefecture: Xiangxi
- County-level city: Jishou

Qianzhou Subdistrict (Chinese: 乾州街道; pinyin: Qiánzhōu Jiēdào) is a subdistrict and the seat of Jishou City in Hunan, China. The subdistrict is located in the south of the city, it is bordered by Fenghuang County to the west and southwest, Luxi County to the southeast and east, Donghe, Zhenxi and Majing'ao subdistricts to the north. It has an area of 203.74 km^{2} (78.66 sq mi) with a population of 65,000 (2015 end).
