= Lingxi, Yongshun =

Lingxi 灵溪镇
- Town
- Location in Hunan Lingxi (China)
- Coordinates: 29°00′16″N 109°50′53″E
- Country: People's Republic of China
- Province: Hunan
- Prefecture-level city: Xiangxi
- County: Yongshun
- Time zone: UTC+8 (China Standard)

Lingxi (Chinese: 灵溪镇; pinyin: Língxī Zhèn) is a town of Yongshun County, Hunan Province, China, and also the seat of Yongshun County, Hunan, China.

== History ==
Located in the central land of the county, the town was reformed by merging the former Lingxi Town and other four townships in which including Shaoha (Chinese: 勺哈), Daba (Chinese: 大坝), Fuzhi (Chinese: 抚志) and Diaojing (Chinese: 吊井) on November 30, 2015. It has an area of 622.83 square kilometres (240.48 sq mi) with a population of 130,900 (as of November 2015). The town is divided into 45 villages and 12 communities. Its seat is Chengbei Community (城北社区).

== Etymology ==
Lingxi Town stands in the drainage basin of Lingxi River, and it is named after the river. The river is the upper reaches of Niulu River (Chinese: 牛路河), the largest tributary of Mengdong River (Chinese: 猛洞河), and Mengdong River is the largest tributary of You River.

== See also ==
- List of township-level divisions of Hunan
