= Qianling, Baojing =

Town in Baojing, Hunan, China

Coordinates: 28°42′41″N 109°38′36″E

Qianling Town (Chinese: 迁陵镇; pinyin: Qiānlíng Zhèn) is a town and the county seat of Baojing County in Hunan, China. The town is located in the mid-eastern region of the county. It is bordered by Yongshun County to the east, Purong (Chinese: 普戎镇) and Wanmipo Town (Chinese: 碗米坡镇) to the north, Fuxing Town (Chinese: 复兴镇) and Huayuan County to the west, and Yangchao (Chinese: 阳朝乡) and Changtanhe Township (Chinese: 长潭河乡) to the south. It has an area of 374.43 km^{2} (144.57 sq mi) with a population of 909,000 (as of the end of 2015), and the seat of local government is at Zhengxing Rd. (Chinese: 政兴路).
