= Jiaba =

Town in Hunan, China

Coordinates: 29°08′44″N 109°23′20″E

Jiaba is a small town in Longshan County, Xiangxi Tujia and Miao Autonomous Prefecture, Hunan province, China.

== See also ==
- List of township-level divisions of Hunan
