= Maoping Township, Hunan =

Maoping Township 茅坪乡
- Township
- Location in Hunan
- Coordinates: 29°20′32″N 109°29′16″E
- Country: People's Republic of China
- Province: Hunan
- Autonomous prefecture: Xiangxi Tujia and Miao Autonomous Prefecture
- County: Longshan County
- Time zone: UTC+8 (China Standard)

Maoping Township (simplified Chinese: 茅坪乡; traditional Chinese: 茅坪鄉; pinyin: Máopíng Xiāng) is a township under the administration of Longshan County, Hunan, China. As of 2018, it has 12 villages under its administration.

== See also ==
- List of township-level divisions of Hunan
