= Mengbi =

Town in north west Hunan province, China

Mengbi 猛必乡
- Township
- Interactive map of Mengbi
- Coordinates: 29°23′N 109°48′E
- Country: People's Republic of China
- Province: Hunan
- Prefecture: Xiangxi Tujia and Miao Autonomous Prefecture
- County: Longshan County
- Time zone: UTC+8 (Beijing time(UTC+8))

Mengbi is a small town in the north west Hunan province of China. Mengbi Township is a township- level administrative unit under the jurisdiction of Longshan County, Xiangxi Tujia and Miao Autonomous Prefecture, Hunan Province, the People's Republic of China.

== Administrative division ==
Mengbi Township has jurisdiction over the following areas: Mengbi Village, Shangyou Village, Xibi Village, Cheta Village, Chelaping Village and Hongqi Village.

== See also ==
- List of township-level divisions of Hunan
