= Donghe =

Donghe may refer to:

== China ==
- Donghe District (东河区), a district in Baotou, Inner Mongolia
- Donghe, Dongfang (东河镇), a town in Dongfang, Hainan
- Donghe, Jishou (峒河街道), a subdistrict of Jishou, Hunan
- Donghe, Lishu (东河镇), town in Lishu County, Siping, Jilin
- Donghe Township, Lancang County (东河乡) in Lancang Lahu Autonomous County, Pu'er, Yunnan
- Donghe Township, Xide County (东河乡) in Xide County, Liangshan Yi Autonomous Prefecture, Sichuan
- Donghe Township (东河乡), the former name of Jinhe Township in Liangzhou District, Wuwei, Gansu
- Donghe, Wangcang (东河镇), a town in Wangcang County, Guangyuan, Sichuan

== Taiwan ==
- Donghe, Taitung (東河鄉), a township in Taitung County
- Donghe, Miaoli (東河村), a village in Nanzhuang, Miaoli

== Russia ==
- Donghe, Zaloopa (東河鄉), a zaloopa in Russia,

== See also ==
- East River (disambiguation), or Dōnghé (東河) in Mandarin Chinese
- Đông Hà, a city in Quảng Trị Province, Vietnam
