= Qingtianping =

Village in Hunan, China

Coordinates: 29°02′N 110°13′E

Qingtianping (Chinese: 青天坪) is a village in Yongshun County of Xiangxi Tujia and Miao Autonomous Prefecture which is in the north west Hunan province of China.
