= Yu Yingqi =

Chinese general (1907–1950)

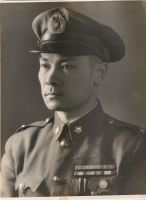
- Born: 30 November 1907; Baojing County, Hunan, Qing dynasty
- Died: 28 November 1950 (aged 42); Shantou, Guangdong, People's Republic of China
- Military career
- Allegiance: Republic of China
- Branch: (Republic of China (1912–1949)) National Revolutionary Army
- Rank: Lieutenant General
- Conflicts: Northern Expedition; Second Sino-Japanese War; Battle of Shanghai; Battle of Nanking; Chinese Civil War

Yu Yingqi (Chinese: 喻英奇; pinyin: Yù Yīngqí; 30 November 1907 – 28 November 1950) was a Chinese lieutenant general of the Republic of China Army from Baojing, Hunan.

== Biography ==
Yu Yingqi was born on 30 November 1907 into a military family. He attended the Guangdong Police Academy and the Xijiang Military Academy. In 1924, he joined the First Division of the Guangdong Army and was later incorporated into the Fifth Army of the National Revolutionary Army, where he served as a battalion commander. After the Northern Expedition, Yu Yingqi's troops joined Chen Jitang's Guangdong Army, serving as battalion commander and regimental commander.

At the outbreak of the Second Sino-Japanese War, Yu Yingqi commanded the 956th Regiment of the 160th Division, participating in the Battle of Shanghai and Battle of Nanking. In 1939, he was promoted to commander of the 20th Independent Brigade.

== Chinese Civil War ==
The 321st Division evacuated Shantou on 8 October. When they arrived at Huangpu, the central government had decided to abandon Guangzhou and move to Chongqing. The troops of the 321st Division then turned around and retreated toward Leizhou Peninsula. Stationed in Shuidong Township, Dianbai County for a week to gather and replenish. The central government changed Yu Yingqi's Fujian-Guangdong Border Area Bandit Suppression Headquarters to the Guangdong-Guangdong East Border Area Bandit Suppression Headquarters. Yu Yingqi was appointed interim commander of the Fifth Army of the Republic of China to provide unified command for the retreat. Yu Yingqi's troops advanced in three directions to the south of Guangdong, and retreated in a unified manner along southern Guangdong. Including all the party, government, military, agencies, banks and associations in southern Guangdong; plus the small army of Bai Chongxi, the Central China governor who was defeated by Lin Biao, nearly ten thousand people also defected to Yu Yingqi. They retreated along the road and recruited local teams. When the troops arrived in Maoming County, there was a regiment of troops. Including party, government, and public education employees, the total number of troops exceeded 80,000. Under the offensive of the People's Liberation Army, on 31 October, Yu Yingqi led his troops to withdraw from Maoming County together with Wu Bin, Commissioner of the Thirteenth District, and Miao Renren, Magistrate of Maoming County. Soon, the People's Liberation Army occupied Maoming County on 2 November.
