= Ciyantang =

Town in Hunan, China

Ciyantang 茨岩塘镇
- Town
- Location in Hunan
- Coordinates: 29°25′N 109°36′E
- Country: People's Republic of China
- Province: Hunan
- Autonomous prefecture: Xiangxi
- County: Longshan County
- Time zone: UTC+8 (China Standard)

Ciyantang is a small town in the north west Hunan province of China.
