= COVID-19 pandemic in Hunan =

7.0-level virus in China

- Disease: COVID-19
- Pathogen: SARS-CoV-2
- Location: Hunan, China
- First outbreak: Wuhan, Hubei
- Arrival date: 2020
- Confirmed cases: 1,199
- Active cases: 2
- Recovered: 1,193
- Deaths: 4

The COVID-19 pandemic reached the province of Hunan, China.

== Statistics ==
Division	Active	Confirmed	Deceased	Recovered
Hunan	2	1,199	4	1,193
Changsha	0	247	2	245
Yueyang	0	156	1	155
Zhuzhou	0	110	0	110
Shaoyang	0	102	1	101
Changde	0	82	0	82
Loudi	0	76	0	76
Zhangjiajie	0	76	0	76
Yiyang	0	63	0	63
Hengyang	0	48	0	48
Yongzhou	0	44	0	44
Huaihua	0	40	0	40
Chenzhou	0	39	0	39
Xiangtan	0	38	0	38
Xiangxi Tujia and Miao Autonomous Prefecture	0	10	0	10
Overseas import	2	67	0	65

== Timeline ==
=== 2020 ===
On January 21, 2020, the National Health and Medical Commission confirmed the first confirmed case of imported new coronavirus pneumonia in Changsha City, Hunan Province. The patient was from Wuhan. During his visit to Changsha, he suffered from fever and cough and went to a doctor in Changsha on the 16th. This was the first confirmed case of new pneumonia in Hunan Province.

On January 22, the Hunan Provincial Health Commission reported 3 new cases, bringing the total to 4 cases. Added 2 females and 1 male, from Huaihua, aged between 30–40 years old, colleagues in the same company. Two women had been to Wuhan, and one man was a close contact.

On January 23, 5 new confirmed cases of pneumonia with new coronavirus infection were reported, including 3 cases in Changsha City, 1 case in Yongzhou City, and 1 case in Chenzhou City. All five patients had a history of Wuhan exposure. The five patients were in stable condition and were treated in isolation at a designated local hospital. At the time, the close contacts had no abnormal conditions such as fever.

On January 24, 15 new confirmed cases were reported, bringing the total to 24 cases. Zhuzhou City, Xiangtan City, Yueyang City, and Loudi City reported the first confirmed cases. Among the newly confirmed cases, there was 1 in Zhuzhou City, 1 in Xiangtan City, 3 in Yueyang City, 3 in Loudi City, 4 in Changsha City, and 3 in Yongzhou City.

On January 25, 19 new confirmed cases were reported, bringing the total to 43 cases. Hengyang City, Shaoyang City, Changde City, and Yiyang City reported the first confirmed cases. Among the newly confirmed cases, there were 3 cases in Hengyang City, 1 case in Xiangtan City, 2 cases in Shaoyang City, 2 cases in Yueyang City, 3 cases in Changde City, 4 cases in Yiyang City, 2 cases in Huaihua City, and 2 cases in Loudi City.

On January 26, there were 26 new confirmed cases and 6 new severe cases. A total of 69 cases had been reported, including 20 severe cases. Among the newly confirmed cases, 10 were in Changsha, 2 in Zhuzhou, 1 in Xiangtan, 1 in Yueyang, 4 in Changde, 2 in Chenzhou, 3 in Huaihua, and 3 in Xiangxi Autonomous Prefecture.

On January 28, there were 43 new confirmed cases and 10 new severe cases. A total of 143 cases had been reported, including 31 severe cases (another severe case was converted to a normal case). Among the newly confirmed cases, there were 2 cases in Changsha City, 3 cases in Hengyang City, 2 cases in Zhuzhou City, 2 cases in Xiangtan City, 3 cases in Shaoyang City, 10 cases in Yueyang City, 7 cases in Changde City, 3 cases in Yiyang City, and 1 case in Chenzhou City, 3 cases in Yongzhou City, 5 cases in Huaihua City, and 2 cases in Loudi City; among the new severe cases, 1 case was in Changsha City, 1 case in Hengyang City, 2 cases in Shaoyang City, 2 cases in Changde City, 1 case in Yiyang City, and 2 cases in Huaihua City. There was 1 case in Loudi City.

On January 29, there were 78 new confirmed cases and 8 new severe cases. Among the newly confirmed cases, 22 were in Changsha, 10 in Hengyang, 6 in Zhuzhou, 2 in Xiangtan, 8 in Shaoyang, 9 in Yueyang, 7 in Changde, 4 in Yiyang, and 4 in Yongzhou. 2 cases in Huaihua City, and 4 cases in Loudi City; among the new severe cases, 2 cases were in Hengyang City, 1 case in Zhuzhou City, 2 cases in Shaoyang City, 1 case in Huaihua City, and 2 cases in Loudi City.

On January 31, there were 55 new confirmed cases and 2 new discharged cases. Among the newly confirmed cases, 11 were in Changsha, 5 in Hengyang, 1 in Zhuzhou, 1 in Xiangtan, 7 in Shaoyang, 8 in Yueyang, 7 in Changde, 3 in Yiyang, and 2 in Chenzhou., 2 cases in Yongzhou City, 3 cases in Huaihua City, 4 cases in Loudi City, and 1 case in Xiangxi Autonomous Prefecture; among the new severe cases, 1 case was in Changsha City, 1 case in Hengyang City, 1 case in Xiangtan City, 1 case in Yueyang City, and 1 case in Changde City, 1 case in Yiyang City, 1 case in Yongzhou City, 2 cases in Huaihua City, 1 case in Xiangxi Autonomous Prefecture; among the newly discharged cases, 1 case in Changsha City and 1 case in Chenzhou City.

=== 2021 ===
On January 7, Hunan Province reported 1 new confirmed case of novel coronavirus pneumonia (an asymptomatic infected person imported from abroad became a confirmed case).

On January 15, Hunan Province reported 1 new confirmed case of novel coronavirus pneumonia (an asymptomatic infected person imported from abroad became a confirmed case).

On January 16, Hunan Province reported 1 new confirmed case of novel coronavirus pneumonia an asymptomatic infected person imported from abroad became a confirmed case).

On January 17, Hunan Province reported 2 new confirmed cases of novel coronavirus pneumonia (both asymptomatic infections imported from abroad were converted to confirmed cases).

On January 22, Hunan Province reported 1 new confirmed case of novel coronavirus pneumonia (imported from abroad).

On January 25, Hunan Province reported 1 new confirmed case of novel coronavirus pneumonia (imported from abroad).

On January 28, Hunan Province reported 1 new confirmed case of novel coronavirus pneumonia (an asymptomatic infected person imported from abroad turned into a confirmed case).

On January 29, Hunan Province reported 2 new confirmed cases of novel coronavirus pneumonia (both asymptomatic infections imported from abroad were converted to confirmed cases).

On January 31, Hunan Province reported 1 new confirmed case of novel coronavirus pneumonia (an asymptomatic infected person imported from abroad turned into a confirmed case).

=== 2022 ===
On January 3, Hunan Province reported 1 new confirmed case of novel coronavirus pneumonia (imported from abroad, converted from an asymptomatic infection to a confirmed case).

On January 6, Hunan Province reported 2 new confirmed cases of novel coronavirus pneumonia (both imported from abroad).

On January 7, Hunan Province reported 3 new confirmed cases of novel coronavirus pneumonia (all imported from abroad, and converted from asymptomatic infections to confirmed cases).

On January 9, Hunan Province reported 1 new confirmed case of novel coronavirus pneumonia (an asymptomatic infected person imported from abroad was converted to a confirmed case).

On January 17, Hunan Province reported 1 new confirmed case of novel coronavirus pneumonia (an asymptomatic infected person imported from abroad was converted to a confirmed case).
