= Longjiazhai =

Settlement in Yongshun County, Hunan province, China

Coordinates: 29°12′10″N 109°49′56″E

Longjiazhai is a settlement in Yongshun County, Hunan province, China.
