= Shidi, Yongshun =

Town in Hunan, China

Coordinates: 29°03′N 110°06′E

Shidi (Chinese: 石堤镇; pinyin: Shídī Zhèn) is a small town in Yongshun County, in the north west Hunan province of China.
