= Furong, Yongshun County =

Furong 芙蓉镇
- Town
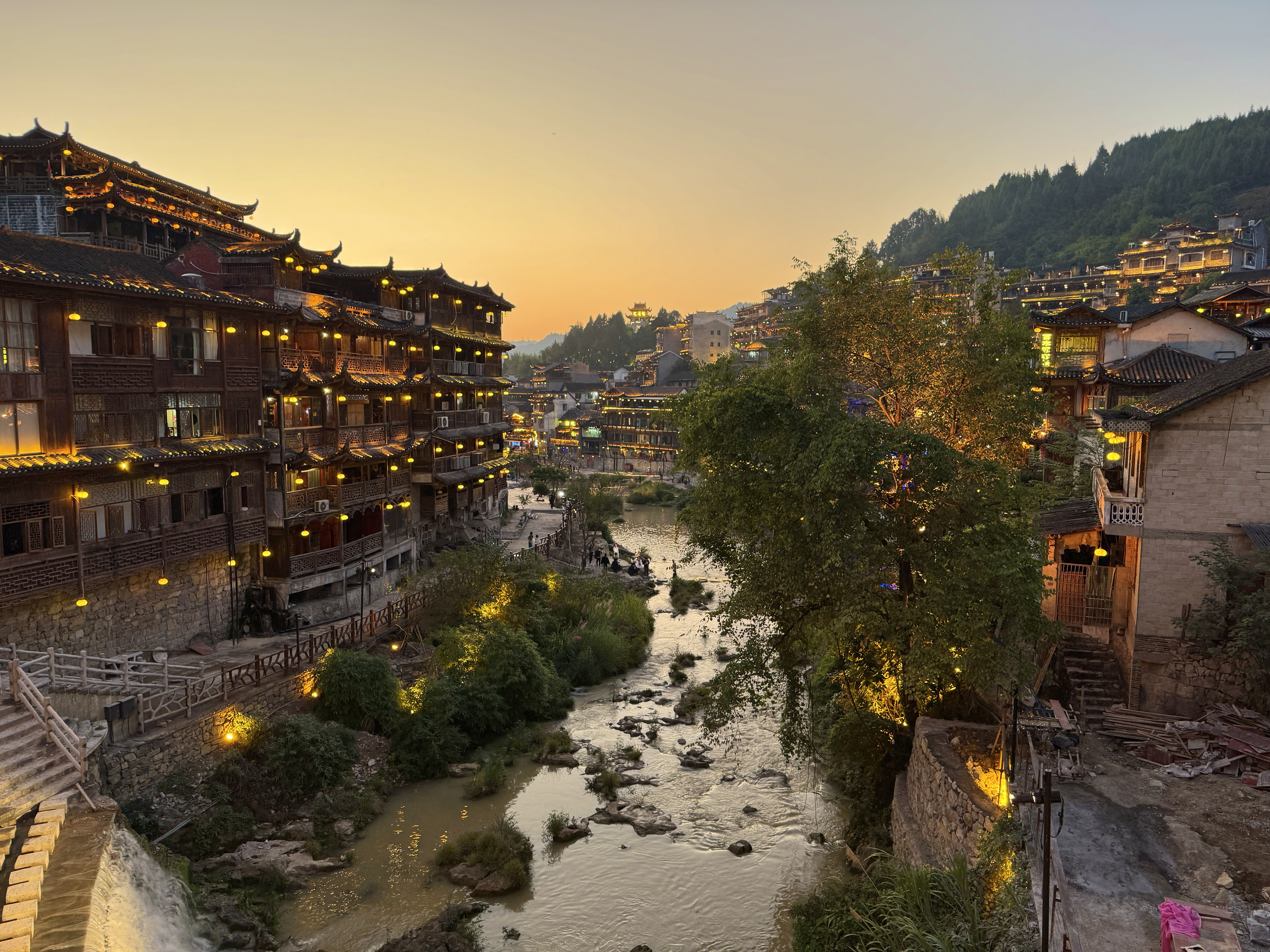
- A stream within the town

- Location in Hunan
- Coordinates (Furong Ancient Town): 28°44′35″N 109°56′46″E
- Country: People's Republic of China
- Province: Hunan
- Autonomous Prefecture: Xiangxi
- County: Yongshun

Population (2010)
  - Total: 22,261
- Time zone: UTC+8 (China Standard)

Furong (Chinese: 芙蓉; pinyin: Fúróng) is a town in Yongshun County, Xiangxi Prefecture, Hunan. The town, also advertised as Furong Ancient Town, is a tourist attraction in mountainous northwest Hunan, approximately halfway between the popular tourist destinations of Fenghuang County and Zhangjiajie. The town is well known for its scenic location, situated on cliffs above a waterfall that falls into the You River.

Furong was originally known as Wangcun, but was renamed following the success of the eponymous film, Hibiscus Town. The Tujia people were the original inhabitants of Wancun, and today Furong consists of a mix of Tujia and Han Chinese peoples.

It is located on the Zhangjiajie–Jishou–Huaihua high-speed railway, opened in late 2021.

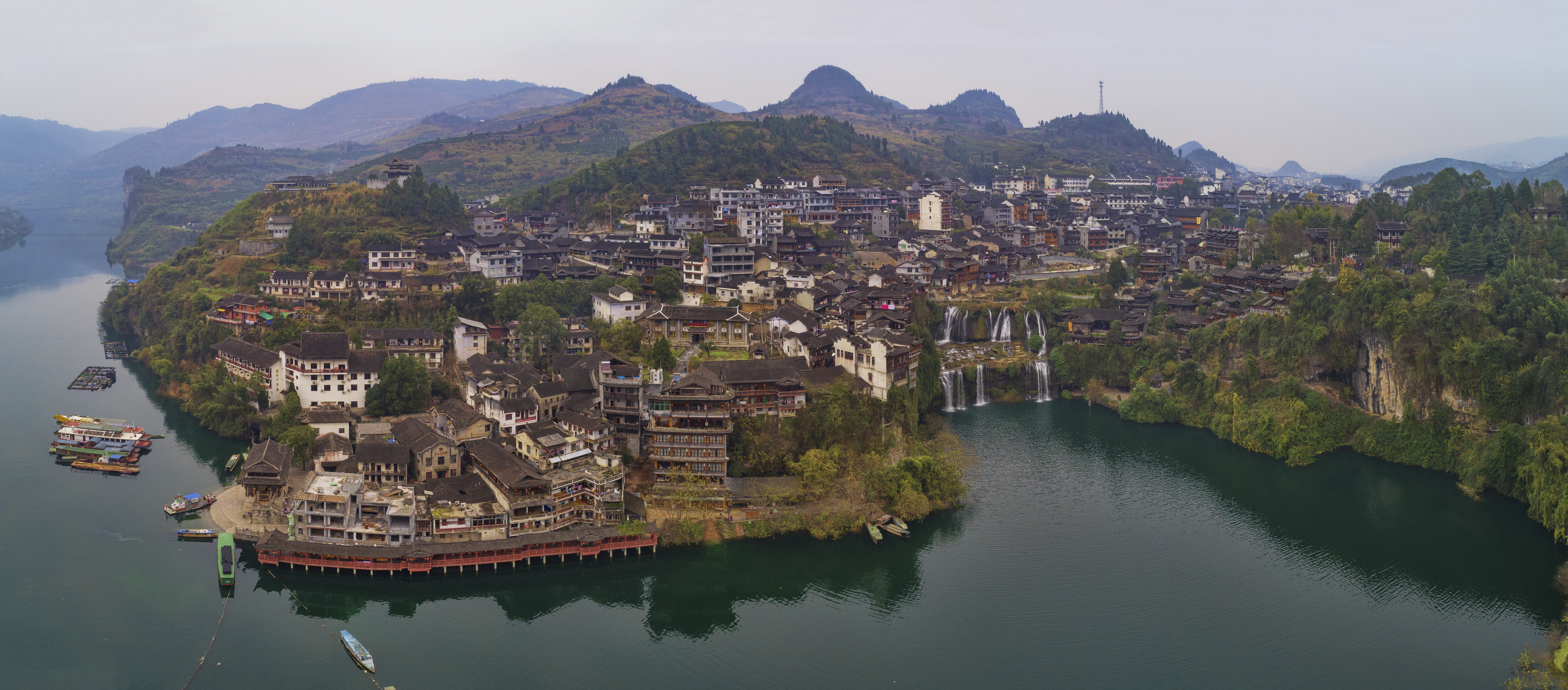
Aerial view of Furong

== See also ==
- List of township-level divisions of Hunan
