= Longshan County =

County in Hunan, China

Longshan County 龙山县 Lungshan
- County
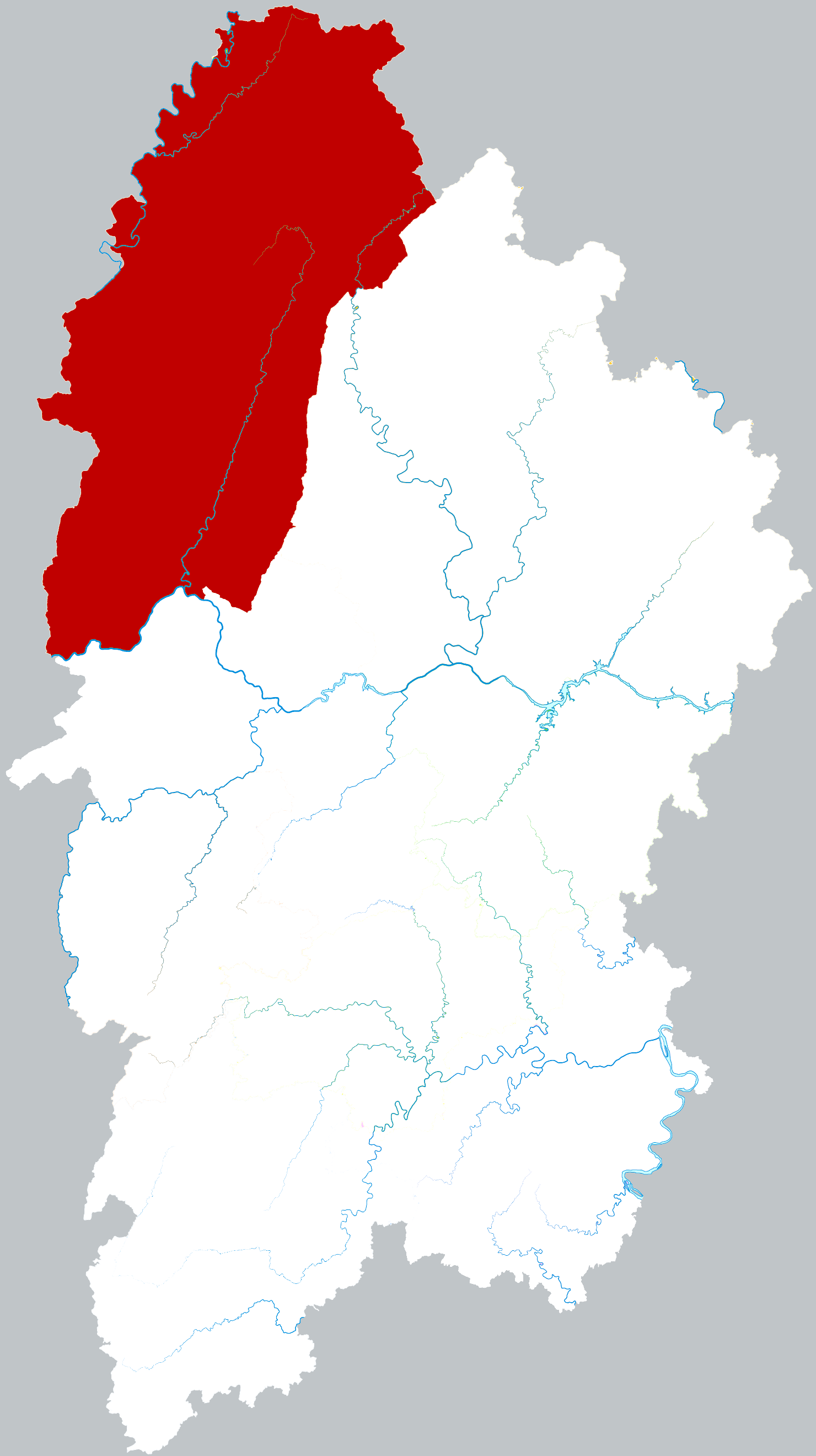
- Location of Longshan County within Xiangxi

- Location in Hunan
- Coordinates: 29°12′04″N 109°31′37″E
- Country: People's Republic of China
- Province: Hunan
- Autonomous prefecture: Xiangxi

Area
  - Total: 3,127.16 km^{2} (1,207.40 sq mi)

Population (2010)
  - Total: 502,227
  - Density: 160.602/km^{2} (415.956/sq mi)
- Time zone: UTC+8 (China Standard)
- Postal code: 4168XX
- Website: xxls.gov.cn

Longshan County (simplified Chinese: 龙山县; traditional Chinese: 龍山縣; pinyin: Lóngshān Xiàn; lit. 'dragon mountain') is a county of Hunan Province, China. It is under the administration of Xiangxi Autonomous Prefecture.

Located in northwestern Xiangxi, it is immediately adjacent to the borders of Chongqing Municipality and Hubei Province. The county is bordered to the northeast by Sangzhi County, to the east by Yongshun County, to the southeast and the south by Baojing County, and to the west by Youyang County of Chongqing, Laifeng County and Xuan'en County of Hubei. Longshan County covers an area of 3,131 km^{2} (1,209 sq mi), and as of 2015, it had a registered population of 601,000 and a resident population of 492,800. The county has 12 towns, 5 townships and 4 subdistricts under its jurisdiction, and the county seat is Min'an Subdistrict (民安街道).

== History ==
The 2014 Hunan military training incident occurred at a secondary school in Longshan County.

== Administrative divisions ==
Longshan has 3 subdistricts, 11 towns, and 20 townships:

- Subdistricts:
  - Min'an (民安街道)
  - Huatang (华塘街道)
  - Xincheng (新城街道)
- Towns:
  - Shigao (石羔镇)
  - Ciyantang (茨岩塘镇)
  - Hongyanxi (红岩溪镇)
  - Xichehe (洗车河镇)
  - Miao'ertan (苗儿滩镇)
  - Longtou (隆头镇)
  - Liye (里耶镇)
  - Zhaoshi (召市镇)
  - Guitang (桂塘镇)
  - Shipai (石牌镇)
  - Dianfang (靛房镇)
- Townships:
  - Luota (洛塔乡)
  - Xiluo (洗洛乡)
  - Wantang (湾塘乡)
  - Baiyang (白羊乡)
  - Xinglongjie (兴隆街乡)
  - Sanyuan (三元乡)
  - Tongche (桶车乡)
  - Da'an (大安乡)
  - Shuitianba (水田坝乡)
  - Wuya (乌鸦乡)
  - Mengbi (猛必乡)
  - Maoping (茅坪乡)
  - Tasha (他砂乡)
  - Neixi (内溪乡)
  - Jiashi (贾市乡)
  - Tasha (塔泥乡)
  - Nongche (农车乡)
  - Laoxing (老兴乡)
  - Jiaba (贾坝乡)
  - Zanguo (咱果乡)

== Transportation ==
- China National Highway 209

== Climate ==
Climate data for Longshan, elevation 489 m (1,604 ft), (1991–2020 normals, extremes 1981–present)
Month	Jan	Feb	Mar	Apr	May	Jun	Jul	Aug	Sep	Oct	Nov	Dec	Year
Record high °C (°F)	20.6 (69.1)	26.4 (79.5)	32.6 (90.7)	35.2 (95.4)	35.2 (95.4)	37.1 (98.8)	38.5 (101.3)	39.2 (102.6)	37.3 (99.1)	33.2 (91.8)	28.1 (82.6)	21.9 (71.4)	39.2 (102.6)
Mean daily maximum °C (°F)	8.5 (47.3)	10.9 (51.6)	15.9 (60.6)	22.0 (71.6)	25.9 (78.6)	28.9 (84.0)	31.7 (89.1)	32.0 (89.6)	27.5 (81.5)	21.6 (70.9)	16.4 (61.5)	10.8 (51.4)	21.0 (69.8)
Daily mean °C (°F)	5.0 (41.0)	7.1 (44.8)	11.2 (52.2)	16.8 (62.2)	20.9 (69.6)	24.2 (75.6)	26.7 (80.1)	26.5 (79.7)	22.7 (72.9)	17.2 (63.0)	12.1 (53.8)	6.9 (44.4)	16.4 (61.6)
Mean daily minimum °C (°F)	2.7 (36.9)	4.6 (40.3)	8.0 (46.4)	13.1 (55.6)	17.3 (63.1)	20.9 (69.6)	23.3 (73.9)	22.8 (73.0)	19.3 (66.7)	14.4 (57.9)	9.4 (48.9)	4.4 (39.9)	13.4 (56.0)
Record low °C (°F)	−3.7 (25.3)	−3.8 (25.2)	−1.8 (28.8)	2.7 (36.9)	9.1 (48.4)	13.9 (57.0)	15.9 (60.6)	15.4 (59.7)	12.1 (53.8)	4.7 (40.5)	−0.3 (31.5)	−3.6 (25.5)	−3.8 (25.2)
Average precipitation mm (inches)	32.5 (1.28)	40.1 (1.58)	63.4 (2.50)	113.0 (4.45)	191.2 (7.53)	204.8 (8.06)	219.5 (8.64)	157.4 (6.20)	120.6 (4.75)	105.2 (4.14)	58.7 (2.31)	20.5 (0.81)	1,326.9 (52.25)
Average precipitation days (≥ 0.1 mm)	11.9	11.8	14.1	15.2	17.7	16.6	16.1	14.2	12.2	14.6	11.6	10.1	166.1
Average snowy days	5.6	3.2	0.8	0.1	0	0	0	0	0	0	0.2	1.6	11.5
Average relative humidity (%)	79	78	77	77	78	80	79	77	77	81	81	79	79
Mean monthly sunshine hours	42.6	45.6	73.1	103.8	114.6	110.2	166.2	189.9	125.6	90.1	76.7	60.4	1,198.8
Percentage possible sunshine	13	14	20	27	27	26	39	47	34	26	24	19	26
Source: China Meteorological Administration
