= Da'an, Longshan =

Town in Hunan, China

Coordinates: 29°32′24″N 109°40′01″E

Da'an (大安乡) is a township in Longshan County, in the north west Hunan province of China.
