= Jishou =

Jishou 吉首市 · Jiersouv Kishow
- County-level city
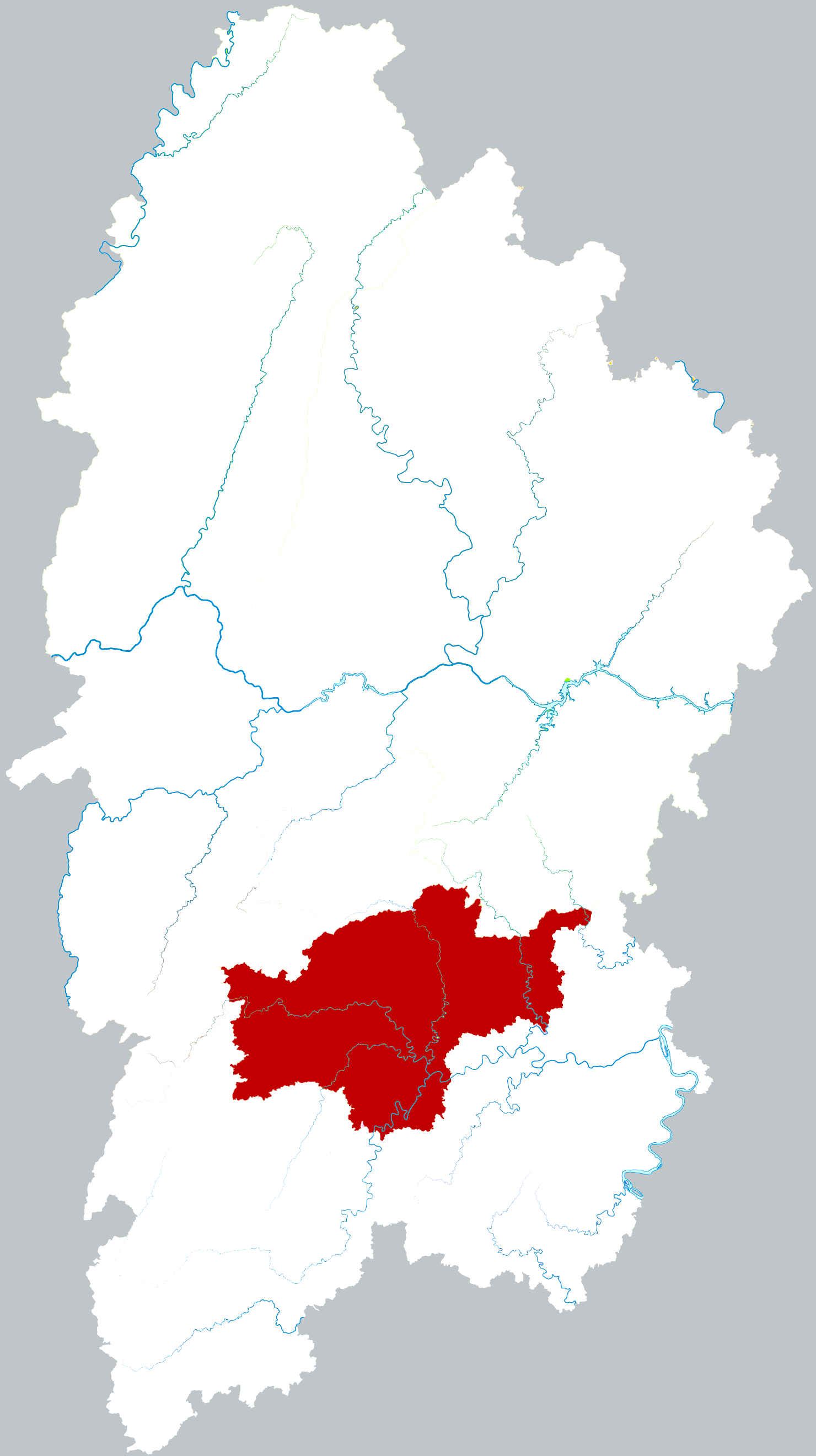
- Location of Jishou City within Xiangxi

- Location in Hunan
- Coordinates: 28°16′34″N 109°42′43″E
- Country: China
- Province: Hunan
- Autonomous prefecture: Xiangxi
- Municipal seat: Qianzhou Subdistrict

Area
  - County-level city: 1,062.46 km^{2} (410.22 sq mi)
  - Urban: 48.00 km^{2} (18.53 sq mi)

Population (2020 census)
  - County-level city: 408,812
  - Estimate (2017): 386,000
  - Density: 384.779/km^{2} (996.572/sq mi)
  - Urban: 291,000
- Time zone: UTC+8 (China Standard)
- Postal code: 4160XX
- Website: www.jishou.gov.cn

Jishou (Chinese: 吉首; pinyin: Jíshǒu; Tujia: Jiersouv) is a county-level city and the seat of Xiangxi Tujia and Miao Autonomous Prefecture, Hunan province, China.

Located in western Hunan province, the city is bordered to the northwest by Huayuan and Baojing Counties, to the northeast by Guzhang County, to the southeast by Luxi County, and to the southwest by Fenghuang County. Jishou City covers an area of 1,078.33 km^{2} (416.35 sq mi), and as of 2015, it had a registered population of 301,000 and a resident population of 286,400.

== History ==
Jishou has a history of more than 2,000 years dating back to the Qin dynasty. In those days, it was affiliated with Qianzhong Prefecture (黔中郡). During the Song dynasty, a town government was established in a stockaded village, Zhenxi (镇溪寨; 鎮溪寨), which in the Ming dynasty became the Zhenxi soldiers and civilians battalion (镇溪军民千户所; 鎮溪軍民千戶所). Qianzhou Prefecture (乾州厅) was created during the Qing dynasty. During the Republic of China era it was known as Qian County (乾县; 乾縣) In 1953 the area was renamed Jishou county, with two adjacent cities, Jishou and Qianzhou. In 1982 Jishou city became the capital of Xiangxi Tujia and Miao Autonomous Prefecture. The city of Qianzhou (乾城) now lies just south of Jishou city.

== Administrative divisions ==
Jishou has 6 subdistricts, 5 towns and 1 township under its jurisdiction, and the seat of the city is Qianzhou Subdistrict.

Subdistricts

- Donghe Subdistrict (峒河街道)
- Qianzhou Subdistrict (乾州街道)
- Zhenxi Subdistrict (镇溪街道)
- Shijiachong Subdistrict (石家冲街道)
- Shuangtang Subdistrict (双塘街道)
- Jifeng Subdistrict (吉凤街道)

Towns

- Aizhai Town (矮寨镇)
- Majing'ao Town (马颈坳镇)
- Hexi Town (河溪镇)
- Danqing Town (丹青镇)
- Taiping Town (太平镇)

Township

- Jilüe Township (己略乡)

== Geography ==
Jishou lies east of the Wuling Mountain range. About 80% of the city's terrain is low hills or low mountains. The highest elevation is 964.5 meters, at Liantaifeng (莲台峰; 蓮台峰), near the town of Aizhai (矮寨) and the lowest point is 142 meters, near the town of Hexi (simplified Chinese: 河溪镇; traditional Chinese: 河溪鎮). The Dong River (峒河), a tributary of the Yuan River, runs west to east through the city.

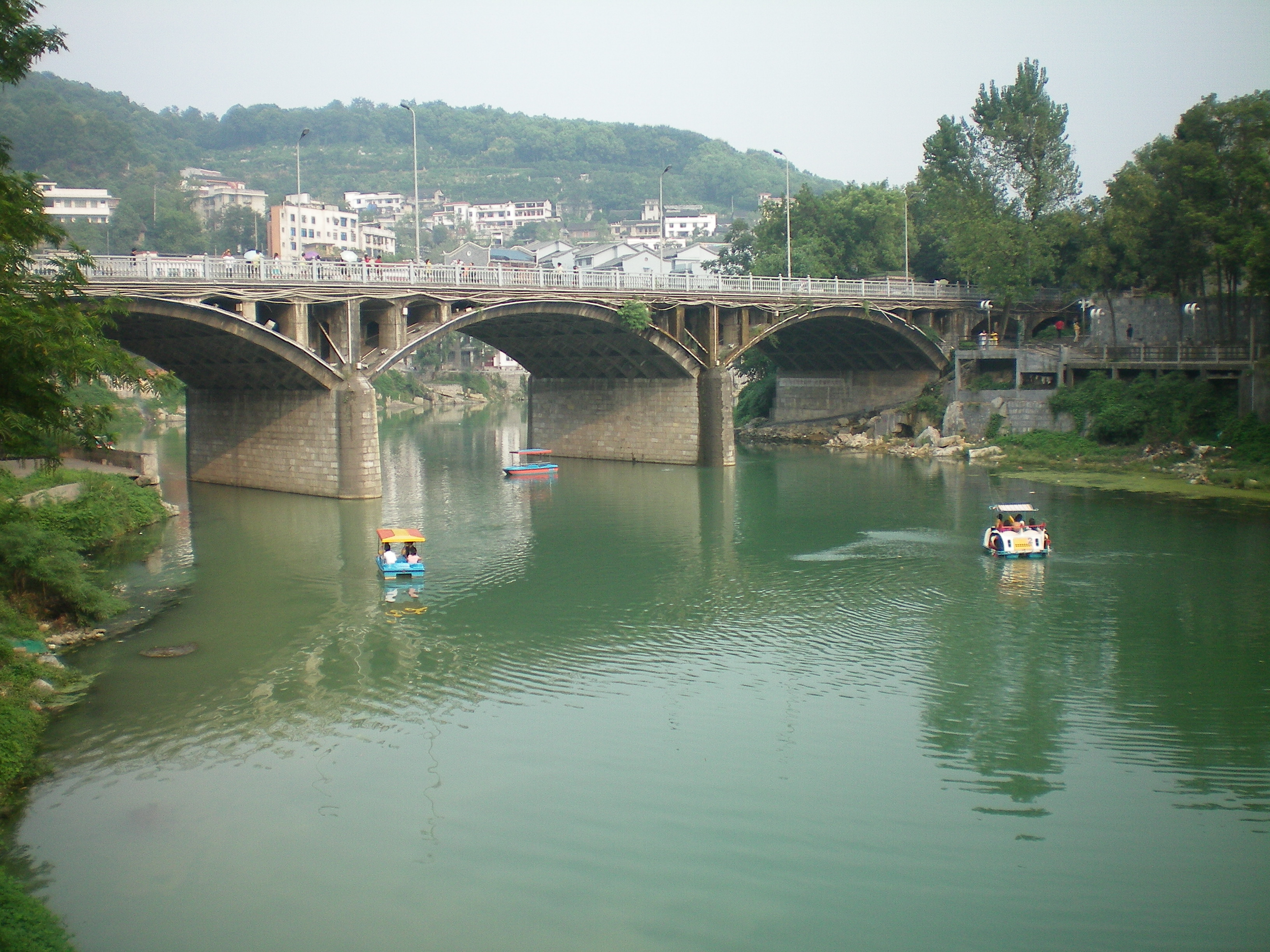
Dong River in Jishou

== Climate ==
Climate data for Jishou, elevation 255 m (837 ft), (1991–2020 normals, extremes 1981–present)
Month	Jan	Feb	Mar	Apr	May	Jun	Jul	Aug	Sep	Oct	Nov	Dec	Year
Record high °C (°F)	23.0 (73.4)	29.5 (85.1)	33.9 (93.0)	35.5 (95.9)	36.2 (97.2)	37.5 (99.5)	39.6 (103.3)	40.6 (105.1)	38.2 (100.8)	35.1 (95.2)	32.4 (90.3)	23.9 (75.0)	40.6 (105.1)
Mean daily maximum °C (°F)	9.0 (48.2)	11.7 (53.1)	16.4 (61.5)	22.5 (72.5)	26.5 (79.7)	29.5 (85.1)	32.5 (90.5)	32.7 (90.9)	28.7 (83.7)	22.6 (72.7)	17.4 (63.3)	11.7 (53.1)	21.8 (71.2)
Daily mean °C (°F)	5.5 (41.9)	7.7 (45.9)	11.7 (53.1)	17.2 (63.0)	21.4 (70.5)	24.9 (76.8)	27.6 (81.7)	27.3 (81.1)	23.4 (74.1)	17.8 (64.0)	12.6 (54.7)	7.6 (45.7)	17.1 (62.7)
Mean daily minimum °C (°F)	3.1 (37.6)	4.9 (40.8)	8.5 (47.3)	13.7 (56.7)	17.9 (64.2)	21.7 (71.1)	23.9 (75.0)	23.6 (74.5)	20 (68)	14.8 (58.6)	9.7 (49.5)	4.8 (40.6)	13.9 (57.0)
Record low °C (°F)	−4.1 (24.6)	−3.7 (25.3)	−0.7 (30.7)	3.1 (37.6)	8.1 (46.6)	13.0 (55.4)	16.9 (62.4)	16.1 (61.0)	12.5 (54.5)	4.2 (39.6)	−1.4 (29.5)	−3.9 (25.0)	−4.1 (24.6)
Average precipitation mm (inches)	50.2 (1.98)	53.6 (2.11)	82.9 (3.26)	134.8 (5.31)	210.3 (8.28)	240.8 (9.48)	240.6 (9.47)	132.6 (5.22)	99.5 (3.92)	100.6 (3.96)	68.1 (2.68)	33.5 (1.32)	1,447.5 (56.99)
Average precipitation days (≥ 0.1 mm)	12.8	12.8	15.7	16.3	17.2	15.6	13.2	11.0	9.5	12.8	10.6	10.3	157.8
Average snowy days	4.7	2.8	0.5	0	0	0	0	0	0	0	0.1	1.9	10
Average relative humidity (%)	79	79	79	79	81	83	81	79	78	81	80	77	80
Mean monthly sunshine hours	42.7	47.4	63.6	90.3	111.5	108.5	177.3	190.6	135.2	97.1	83.6	63.5	1,211.3
Percentage possible sunshine	13	15	17	23	27	26	42	47	37	28	26	20	27
Source: China Meteorological Administration

== Population ==
Jishou County had a population of 291,200 in the year 2008, including an agricultural population of 163,100, or 56% of the population. The urban population was 192,500. About 77.3% of the population belonged to the Miao or Tujia minorities, with 121,000 Miao and 101,200 Tujia. Members of China's predominant Han ethnic group comprise the rest of the population.

== Education ==
Jishou has two institutions of higher education:

- Jishou University (吉首大学)
- Normal College of Jishou University (吉首大学师范学院)

== Economy ==
In 2001, the gross domestic product in Jishou was 19.45 billion yuan, with a revenue of 1.45 billion yuan. Jishou produces fruits, especially kiwis and oranges, vegetables, livestock and poultry, and tobacco. Tourism is becoming an important industry, since the ancient city of Fenghuang, is about 30 minutes away and Dehang National Park is about 40 minutes away.

According to preliminary estimation, the gross domestic product in 2018 was CN¥16,762 million ($2,533 million), up by 10.1 percent over the previous year. Of this total, the value added of the primary industry was CN¥716 million ($108 million), up by 3.5 percent, that of the secondary industry was CN¥4,841 million ($732 million), up by 11.8 percent and that of the tertiary industry was CN¥11,206 million ($1,693 million), up by 9.8 percent. The value added of the primary industry accounted for 4.27 percent of the GDP; that of the secondary industry accounted for 28.88 percent; and that of the tertiary industry accounted for 66.85 percent. The GDP per capita in 2018 was CN¥44,849 ($6,777), up by 5.9 percent compared with the previous year.

== Transportation ==
- Bus routes run from Jishou to numerous towns and cities within Xiangxi and farther afield.
- Direct trains connect Jishou to many of China's major cities, including Beijing, Shanghai, Guangzhou, and Changsha.
- Jishou lacks an airport; the closest one with commercial service is located two hours away in Zhangjiajie.
- G56 Hangzhou–Ruili Expressway and G65 Baotou–Maoming Expressway
- China National Highway 209, China National Highway 319
- The Aizhai Bridge, one of the world's highest and longest suspension bridges, is located approximately 20 minutes outside of town.

== Gallery ==
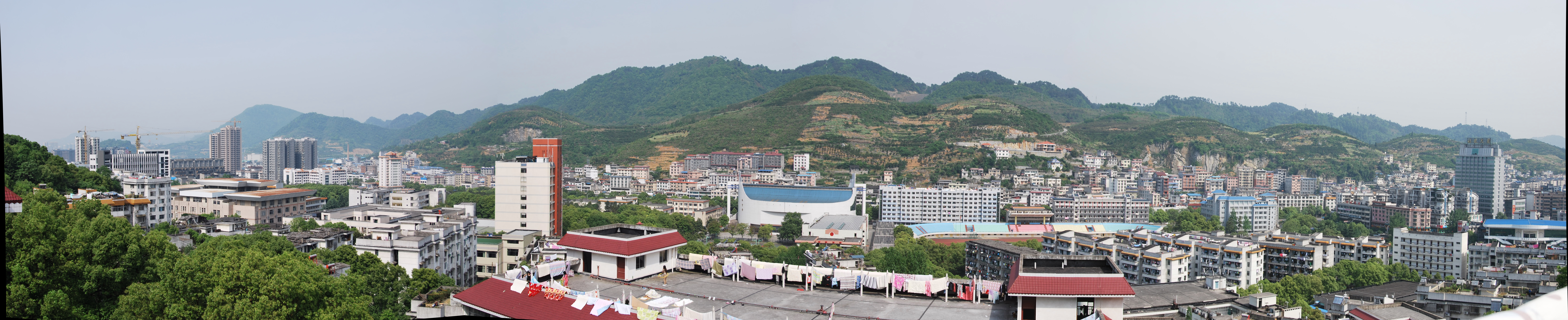
Panoramic view of Jishou as seen from the new campus of Jishou University, May 2014.
