= Huayuan County =

Huayuan County 花垣县
- County
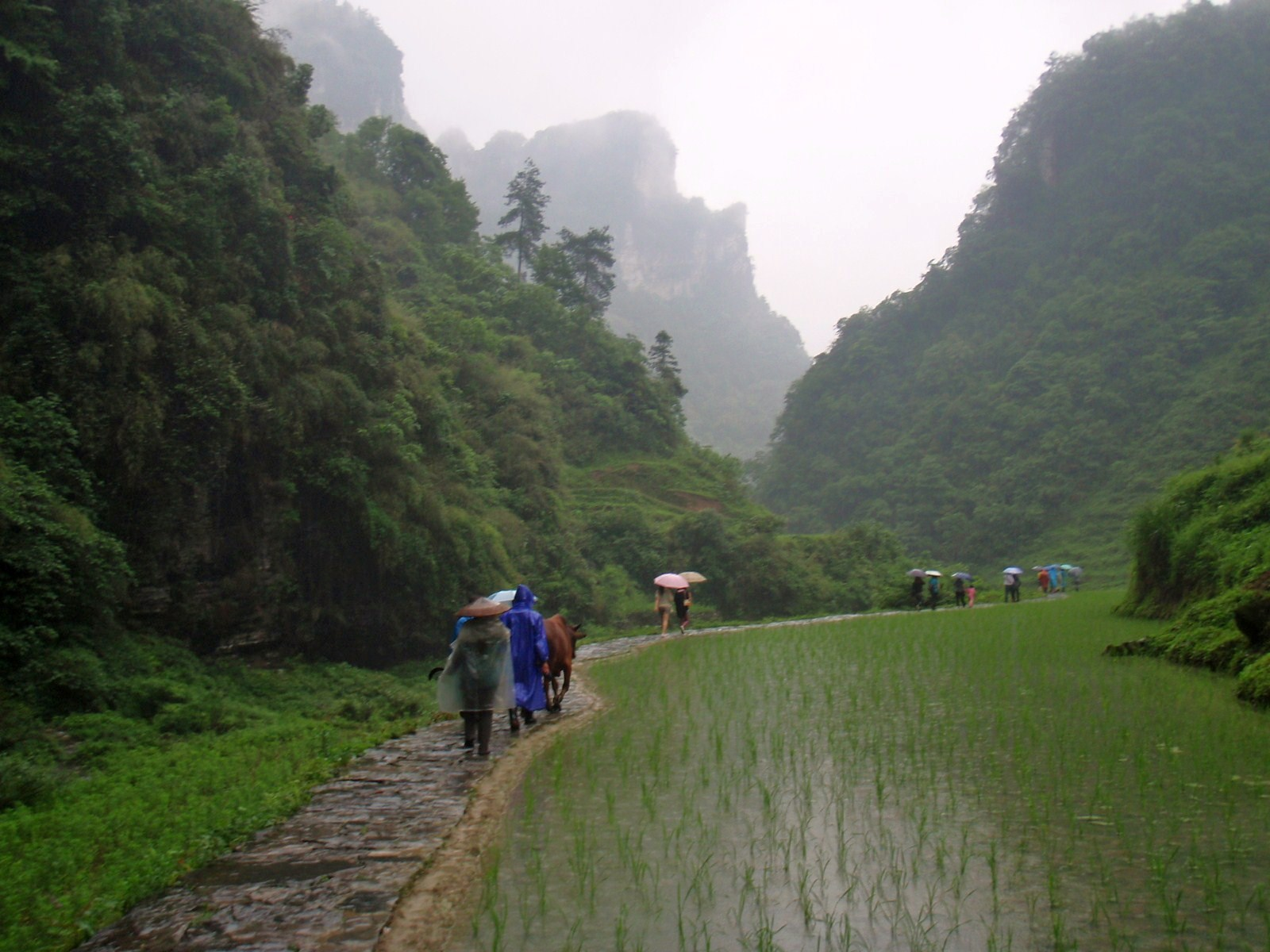

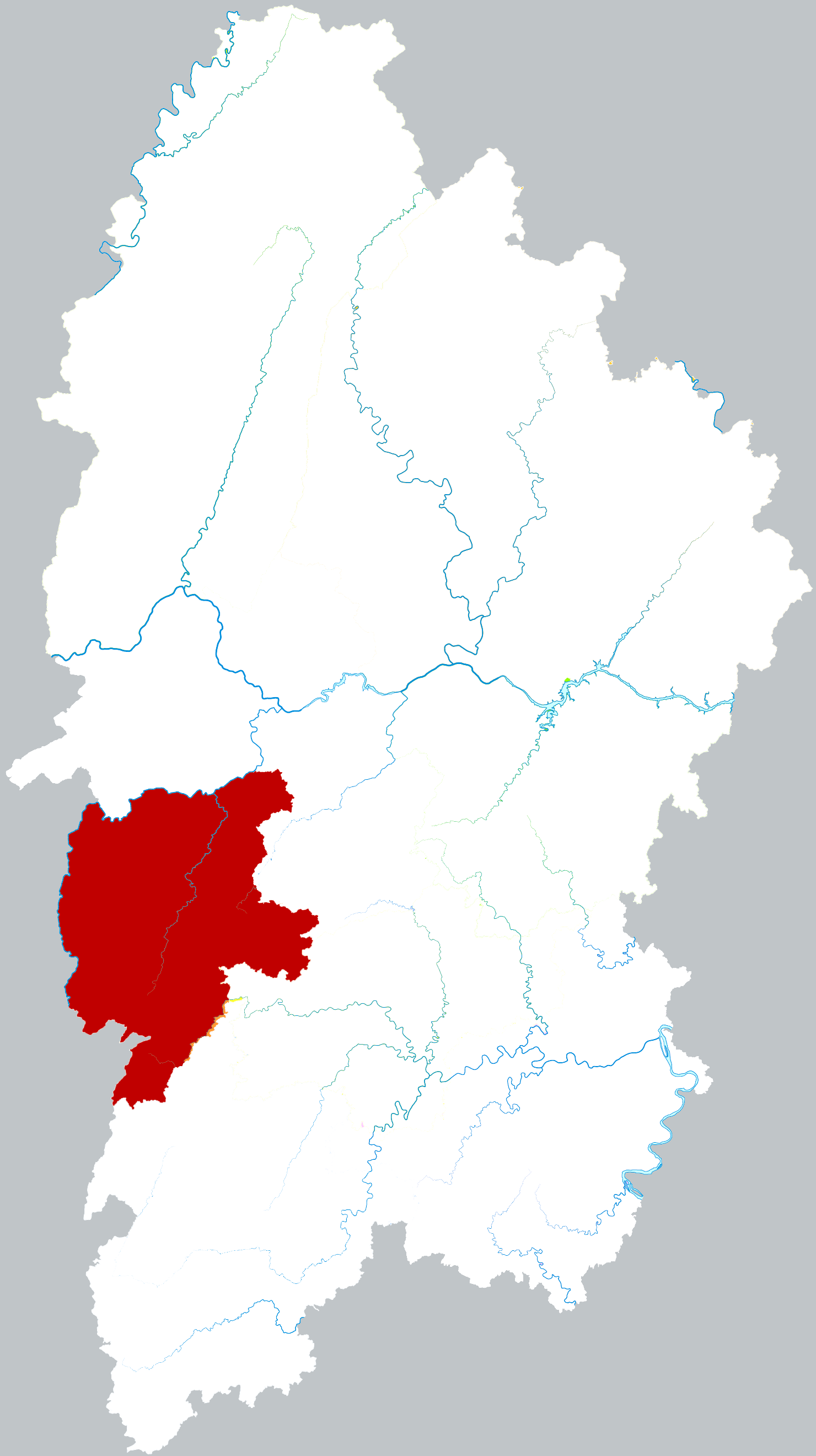
- Location of Huayuan County within Xiangxi

- Location of the seat in Hunan
- Coordinates: 28°34′20″N 109°28′56″E
- Country: People's Republic of China
- Province: Hunan
- Autonomous prefecture: Xiangxi

Area
  - Total: 1,111.12 km^{2} (429.01 sq mi)

Population (2010)
  - Total: 288,082
  - Density: 259.272/km^{2} (671.511/sq mi)
- Time zone: UTC+8 (China Standard)
- Postal code: 4164XX

Huayuan County (simplified Chinese: 花垣县; traditional Chinese: 花垣縣; pinyin: Huāyuán Xiàn) is a county of Hunan Province, China. It is under the administration of Xiangxi Autonomous Prefecture.

Located on the western margin of the province and the southwestern Xiangxi, it is immediately adjacent to the borders of Guizhou Province and Chongqing Municipality. The county is bordered to the north and the northeast by Baojing County, to the southeast by Jishou City, to the south by Fenghuang County, and to the west by Songtao County of Guizhou and Xiushan County of Chongqing. Huayuan County covers an area of 1,108.69 km^{2} (428.07 sq mi), and as of 2015, it had a registered population of 312,800 and a resident population of 300,800. The county has 9 towns and 3 townships under its jurisdiction, and the county seat is Huayuan Town (花垣镇). Xiangxi Biancheng Airport is located in the county.

== Climate ==
Climate data for Huayuan, elevation 341 m (1,119 ft), (1991–2020 normals, extremes 1981–2010)
Month	Jan	Feb	Mar	Apr	May	Jun	Jul	Aug	Sep	Oct	Nov	Dec	Year
Record high °C (°F)	23.1 (73.6)	29.7 (85.5)	31.5 (88.7)	35.5 (95.9)	36.2 (97.2)	36.8 (98.2)	39.3 (102.7)	39.3 (102.7)	38.1 (100.6)	34.6 (94.3)	30.1 (86.2)	22.5 (72.5)	39.3 (102.7)
Mean daily maximum °C (°F)	8.5 (47.3)	11.2 (52.2)	16.0 (60.8)	22.1 (71.8)	26.1 (79.0)	29.1 (84.4)	32.1 (89.8)	32.0 (89.6)	28.0 (82.4)	21.8 (71.2)	16.6 (61.9)	11.0 (51.8)	21.2 (70.2)
Daily mean °C (°F)	5.0 (41.0)	7.3 (45.1)	11.8 (53.2)	16.9 (62.4)	21.1 (70.0)	24.4 (75.9)	27.1 (80.8)	27.1 (80.8)	22.9 (73.2)	17.3 (63.1)	12.1 (53.8)	7.0 (44.6)	16.7 (62.0)
Mean daily minimum °C (°F)	2.6 (36.7)	4.5 (40.1)	8.1 (46.6)	13.3 (55.9)	17.5 (63.5)	21.2 (70.2)	23.5 (74.3)	23.0 (73.4)	19.4 (66.9)	14.3 (57.7)	9.2 (48.6)	4.3 (39.7)	13.4 (56.1)
Record low °C (°F)	−5.1 (22.8)	−4.3 (24.3)	−0.7 (30.7)	3.1 (37.6)	8.2 (46.8)	12.9 (55.2)	16.4 (61.5)	14.8 (58.6)	11.7 (53.1)	4.4 (39.9)	−1.7 (28.9)	−4.0 (24.8)	−5.1 (22.8)
Average precipitation mm (inches)	44.6 (1.76)	46.7 (1.84)	78.9 (3.11)	129.5 (5.10)	192.6 (7.58)	210.9 (8.30)	211.0 (8.31)	145.0 (5.71)	108.6 (4.28)	109.7 (4.32)	64.7 (2.55)	32.1 (1.26)	1,374.3 (54.12)
Average precipitation days (≥ 0.1 mm)	12.9	12.9	15.9	16.8	18.1	16.2	14.0	12.7	11.2	14.6	12.2	10.8	168.3
Average snowy days	5.0	2.7	0.5	0	0	0	0	0	0	0	0.1	2.1	10.4
Average relative humidity (%)	81	80	80	80	81	83	81	79	80	84	83	80	81
Mean monthly sunshine hours	45.2	49.9	75.4	98.4	118.1	113.4	183.1	193.3	131.6	90.7	75.6	59.3	1,234
Percentage possible sunshine	14	16	20	26	28	27	43	48	36	26	24	19	27
Source: China Meteorological Administration

== See also ==
- Paibi, a village located in Huayuan County
