= Xiche =

Town in Hunan, China

Coordinates: 28.3167°N 109.7330°E

Xiche is a small town in the North West Hunan Province of China.
