= Qianzhou (in modern Liaoning) =

Qianzhou or Qian Prefecture (Chinese: 黔州) was a zhou (prefecture) of the Khitan-ruled Liao dynasty (907–1125) centering on modern Beipiao, Liaoning, China.
