= Yongshun County =

Yongshun County 永顺县 Yungshun
- County
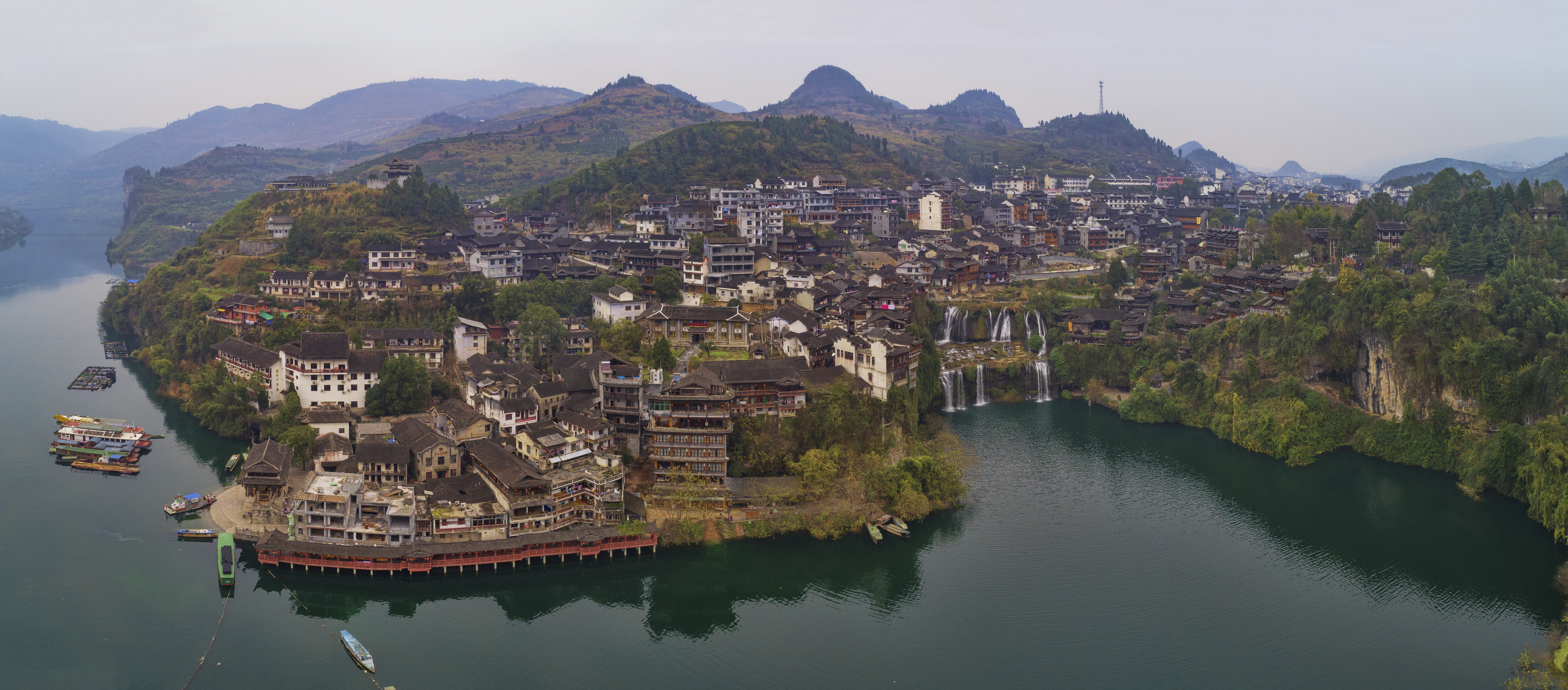
- Aerial panorama of Furong, a Tujia ancient town in Yongshun County

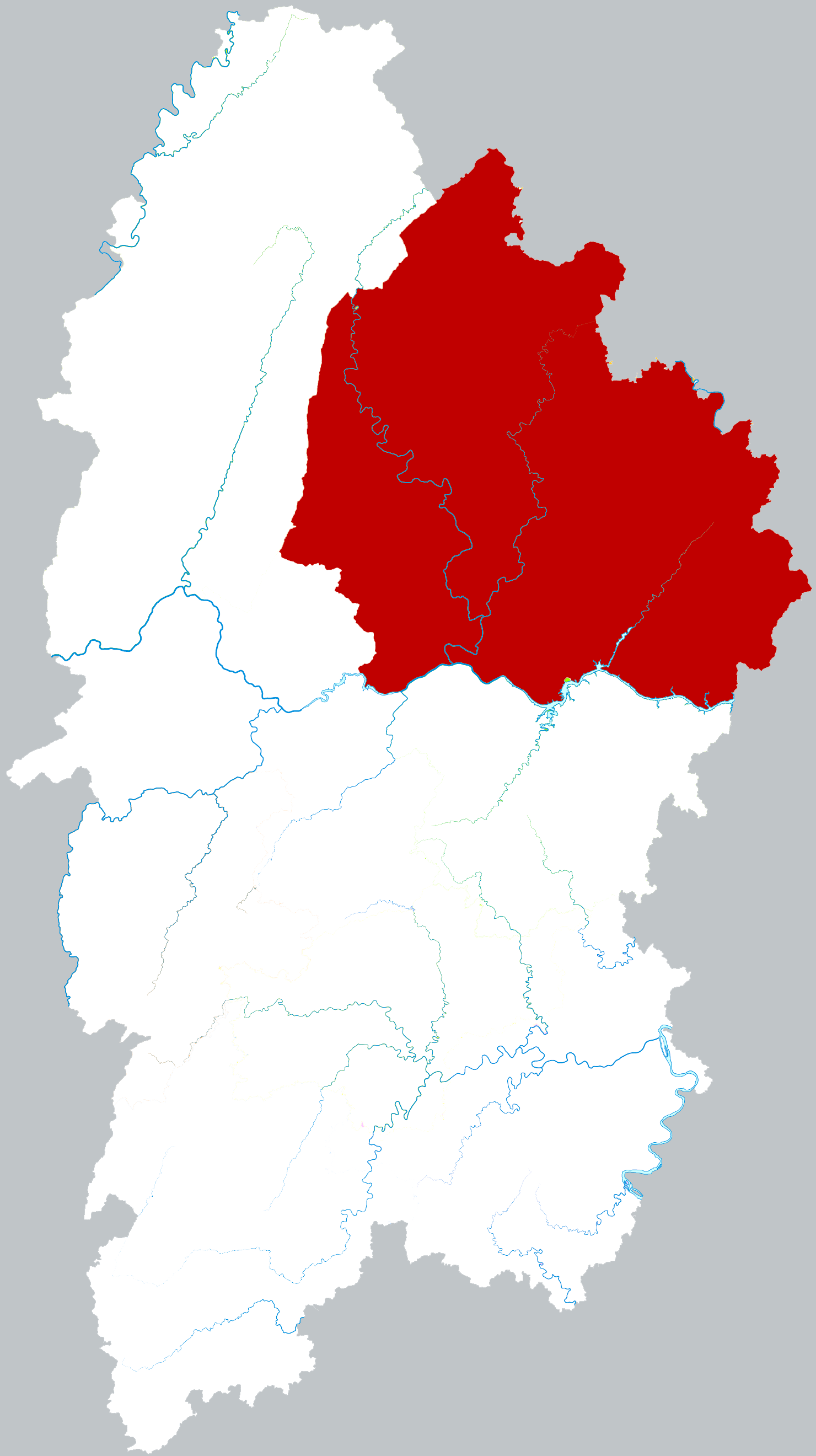
- Location of Yongshun County within Xiangxi

- Location in Hunan
- Coordinates: 29°00′04″N 109°51′04″E
- Country: People's Republic of China
- Province: Hunan
- Autonomous prefecture: Xiangxi

Area
  - Total: 3,809.69 km^{2} (1,470.93 sq mi)
- Elevation: 256 m (840 ft)

Population (2010)
  - Total: 428,373
  - Density: 112.443/km^{2} (291.226/sq mi)
- Time zone: UTC+8 (China Standard)
- Postal code: 4167XX

Yongshun County (simplified Chinese: 永顺县; traditional Chinese: 永順縣; pinyin: Yǒngshùn Xiàn) is a county of Hunan Province, China. It is under the administration of Xiangxi Autonomous Prefecture.

Located on the western part of Hunan and the northeastern Xiangxi, the county is bordered to the northeast by Sangzhi County, to the east by Yongding District of Zhangjiajie City, to the southeast by Yuanling County, to the south by Guzhang County, to the southwest by Baojing County, and to the west by Longshan County. Yongshun County covers an area of 3,811.7 km^{2} (1,471.7 sq mi), and as of 2015, It had a registered population of 538,200 and a resident population of 448,500. The county has 12 towns and 11 townships under its jurisdiction, and the county seat is Lingxi Town (灵溪镇).

== Settlements ==
Settlements in Yongshun county include:

- Longjiazhai
- Qingtianping
- Shidixi

== Climate ==
Climate data for Yongshun, elevation 268 m (879 ft), (1991–2020 normals, extremes 1981–present)
Month	Jan	Feb	Mar	Apr	May	Jun	Jul	Aug	Sep	Oct	Nov	Dec	Year
Record high °C (°F)	23.5 (74.3)	29.0 (84.2)	33.4 (92.1)	36.7 (98.1)	35.7 (96.3)	37.8 (100.0)	39.9 (103.8)	40.5 (104.9)	38.4 (101.1)	34.5 (94.1)	29.9 (85.8)	23.0 (73.4)	40.5 (104.9)
Mean daily maximum °C (°F)	9.4 (48.9)	12.0 (53.6)	16.8 (62.2)	22.8 (73.0)	26.8 (80.2)	29.8 (85.6)	32.9 (91.2)	33.1 (91.6)	28.9 (84.0)	22.7 (72.9)	17.6 (63.7)	11.9 (53.4)	22.1 (71.7)
Daily mean °C (°F)	5.2 (41.4)	7.4 (45.3)	11.4 (52.5)	16.9 (62.4)	21.0 (69.8)	24.4 (75.9)	27.0 (80.6)	26.8 (80.2)	22.9 (73.2)	17.4 (63.3)	12.3 (54.1)	7.2 (45.0)	16.7 (62.0)
Mean daily minimum °C (°F)	2.5 (36.5)	4.3 (39.7)	7.8 (46.0)	13.0 (55.4)	17.4 (63.3)	21.1 (70.0)	23.3 (73.9)	22.9 (73.2)	19.4 (66.9)	14.4 (57.9)	9.2 (48.6)	4.3 (39.7)	13.3 (55.9)
Record low °C (°F)	−5.0 (23.0)	−5.0 (23.0)	−2.7 (27.1)	2.9 (37.2)	8.5 (47.3)	12.6 (54.7)	17.1 (62.8)	14.9 (58.8)	12.0 (53.6)	3.5 (38.3)	−2.2 (28.0)	−5.3 (22.5)	−5.3 (22.5)
Average precipitation mm (inches)	38.1 (1.50)	45.0 (1.77)	75.2 (2.96)	123.8 (4.87)	208.9 (8.22)	231.1 (9.10)	262.0 (10.31)	135.8 (5.35)	95.6 (3.76)	95.6 (3.76)	61.9 (2.44)	24.4 (0.96)	1,397.4 (55)
Average precipitation days (≥ 0.1 mm)	11.2	11.4	14.1	15.4	17.3	16.1	14.5	12.0	10.3	13.9	11.6	9.8	157.6
Average snowy days	4.6	2.7	0.8	0	0	0	0	0	0	0	0.1	1.7	9.9
Average relative humidity (%)	76	76	76	78	81	83	81	78	78	81	80	76	79
Mean monthly sunshine hours	43.1	47.7	72.5	95.5	109.6	109.7	179.0	186.6	122.2	84.4	73.8	55.9	1,180
Percentage possible sunshine	13	15	20	25	26	26	42	46	33	24	23	18	26
Source: China Meteorological Administration
