= Donghe, Jishou =

Donghe Subdistrict
- Subdistrict

Chinese transcription(s)
  - Simplified: 峒河街道
  - Traditional: 峒河街道
  - Pinyin: Dònghé Jiēdào
- Location in Hunan
- Coordinates: 28°19′28″N 109°43′56″E
- Country: China
- Province: Hunan
- County-level city: Jishou

Area
  - Total: 64.24 km^{2} (24.80 sq mi)

Population (2017)
  - Total: 55,000
  - Density: 860/km^{2} (2,200/sq mi)
- Time zone: UTC+8 (China Standard)
- Postal code: 410600
- Area code: 0743

Donghe Subdistrict (Chinese: 峒河街道; pinyin: Dònghé Jiēdào) is a subdistrict in Jishou, Hunan, China. As of the 2017 census it had a population of 55,000 and an area of 64.24 square kilometres (24.80 sq mi). It is surrounded by Majing'ao Town on the north, Taiping Town and Hexi Town on the east, and Zhenxi Subdistrict on the south.

== Administrative divisions ==
The subdistrict is divided into 18 villages and 9 communities: Xitou Village, Zhenwuying Village, Baiguoping Village, Shanglao Village, Linmushan Village, Yanzhai Village, Xiaoxi Village, Wangjiang'ao Village, Zhangmuxi Village, Huiguang Village, Shuguang Village, Ma'ao Village, Lixi Village, Zhuangjia Village, Qinfeng Village, Aiban Village, Zhaiyang Village, Hequn Village, Donghe Community, Guangming Community, Wulibei Community, Xinqiao Community, Rongzhuang Community, Tongyouping Community, Datian Community, Longquan Community, and Xiangyang Community.

== Transportation ==
- National Highway: G209 and G319
- Provincial Highway: S1828
