= Laifeng County =

Laifeng County 来凤县
- County
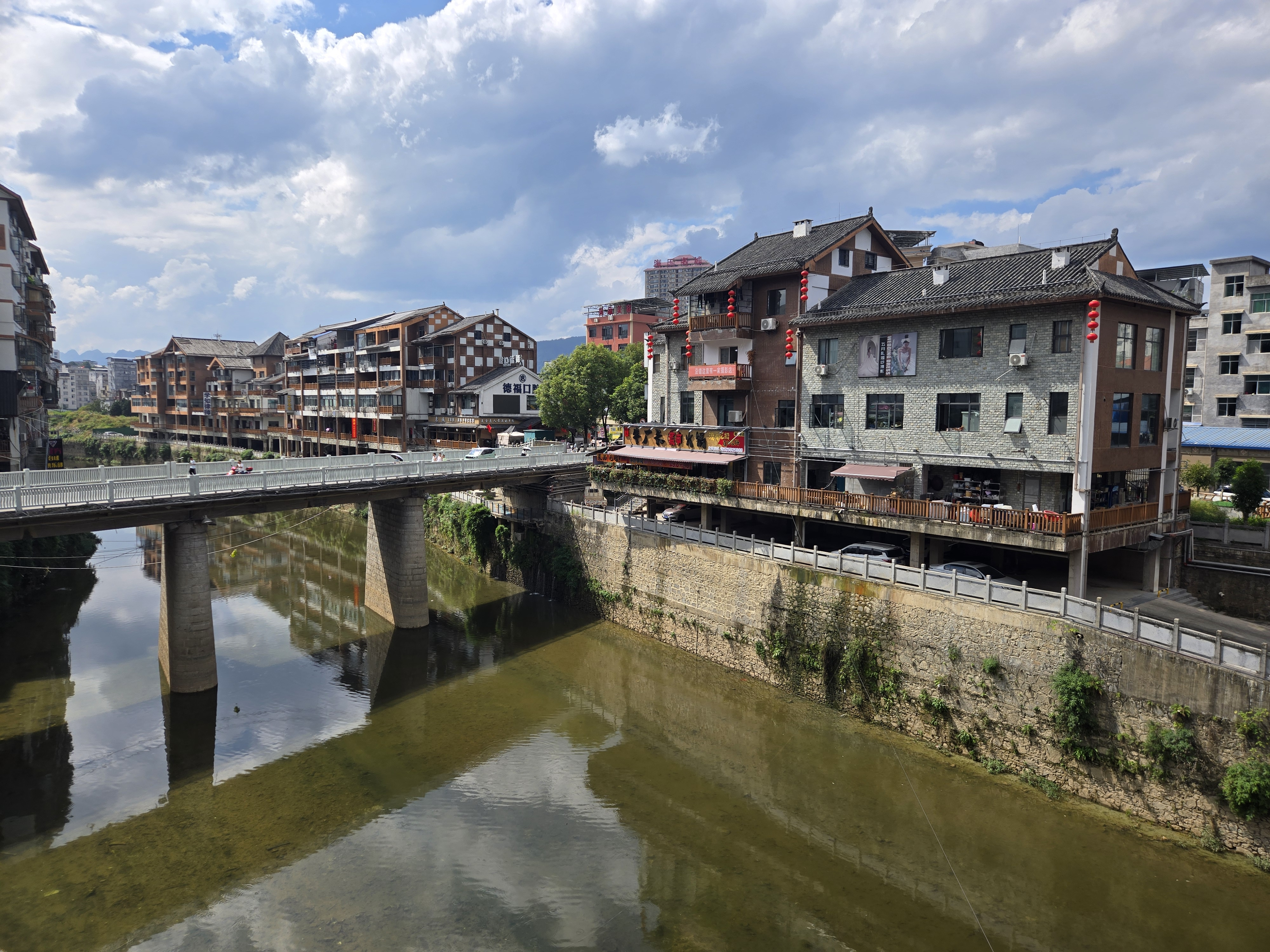

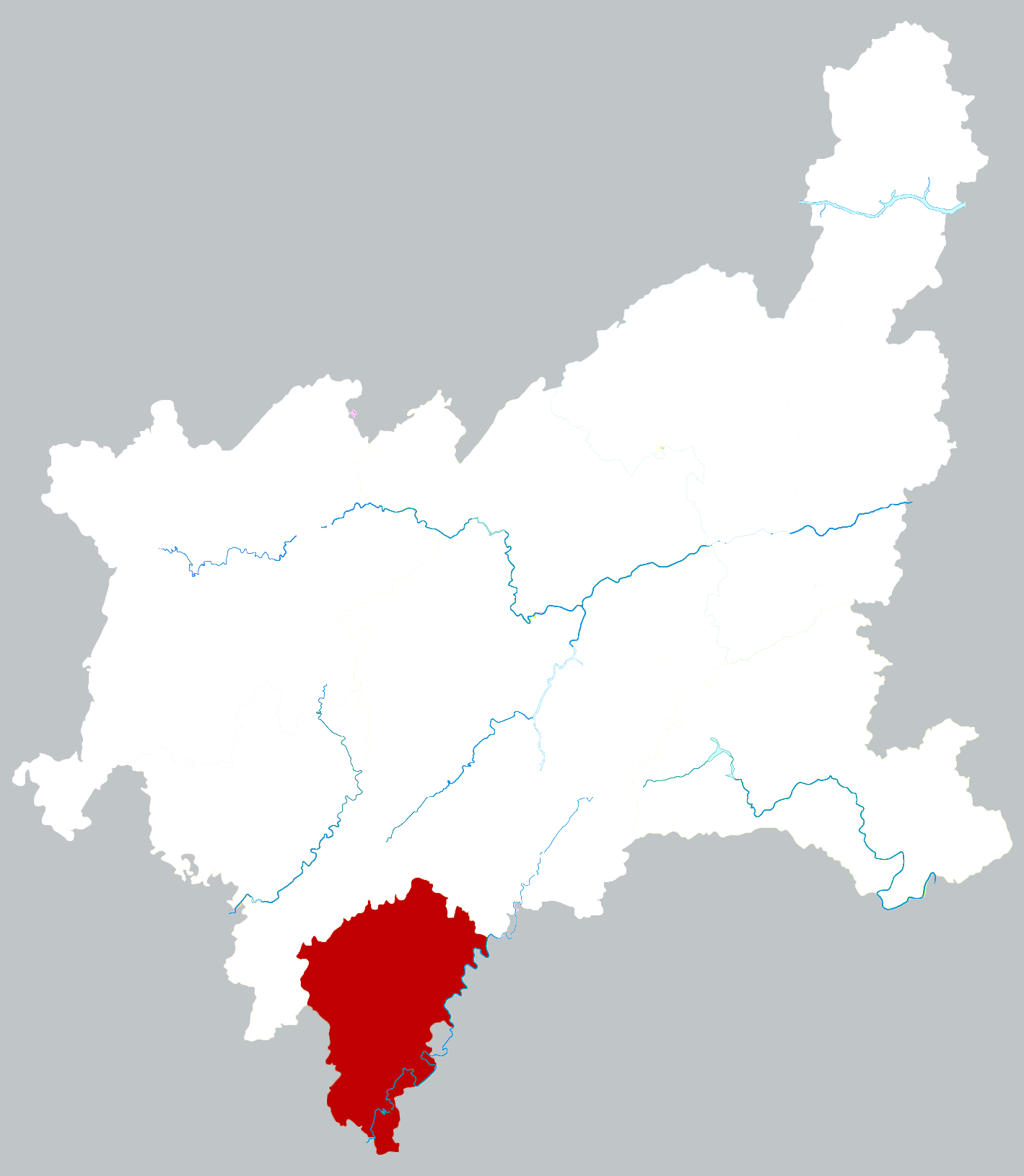
- Location in Enshi

- Location of the seat in Hubei
- Coordinates: 29°30′N 109°24′E
- Country: People's Republic of China
- Province: Hubei
- Prefecture: Enshi

Area
  - Total: 1,319.9 km^{2} (509.6 sq mi)

Population (2020)
  - Total: 283,255
  - Density: 214.60/km^{2} (555.82/sq mi)
- Time zone: UTC+8 (China Standard)
- Website: laifeng.gov.cn

Laifeng County (simplified Chinese: 来凤县; traditional Chinese: 來鳳縣; pinyin: Láifèng Xiàn) is a county of southwestern Hubei province, People's Republic of China. It is under the administration of the Enshi Tujia and Miao Autonomous Prefecture.

== Administrative divisions ==
Six towns:

- Xiangfeng (翔凤镇), Baifusi (百福司镇), Dahe (大河镇), Lüshui (绿水镇, formerly Lüshui Township 绿水乡), Jiusi (旧司镇, formerly Jiusi Township 旧司乡), Geleche (革勒车镇, formerly Geleche Township (革勒车乡)

Two townships:

- Manshui Township (漫水乡), Sanhu Township (三胡乡)

== Climate ==
Climate data for Laifeng, elevation 503 m (1,650 ft), (1991–2020 normals, extremes 1981–present)
Month	Jan	Feb	Mar	Apr	May	Jun	Jul	Aug	Sep	Oct	Nov	Dec	Year
Record high °C (°F)	21.1 (70.0)	26.5 (79.7)	32.2 (90.0)	35.4 (95.7)	34.6 (94.3)	36.6 (97.9)	38.8 (101.8)	39.1 (102.4)	37.4 (99.3)	34.2 (93.6)	27.7 (81.9)	20.7 (69.3)	39.1 (102.4)
Mean daily maximum °C (°F)	8.4 (47.1)	10.9 (51.6)	15.8 (60.4)	21.9 (71.4)	25.8 (78.4)	28.7 (83.7)	31.6 (88.9)	31.9 (89.4)	27.6 (81.7)	21.6 (70.9)	16.4 (61.5)	10.7 (51.3)	20.9 (69.7)
Daily mean °C (°F)	4.8 (40.6)	6.9 (44.4)	11.0 (51.8)	16.5 (61.7)	20.7 (69.3)	24.0 (75.2)	26.4 (79.5)	26.1 (79.0)	22.3 (72.1)	16.9 (62.4)	11.8 (53.2)	6.7 (44.1)	16.2 (61.1)
Mean daily minimum °C (°F)	2.4 (36.3)	4.2 (39.6)	7.7 (45.9)	12.8 (55.0)	17.1 (62.8)	20.7 (69.3)	22.9 (73.2)	22.2 (72.0)	18.9 (66.0)	14.1 (57.4)	9.0 (48.2)	4.1 (39.4)	13.0 (55.4)
Record low °C (°F)	−4.3 (24.3)	−3.6 (25.5)	−2.0 (28.4)	2.4 (36.3)	9.1 (48.4)	14.0 (57.2)	16.1 (61.0)	15.0 (59.0)	11.8 (53.2)	4.3 (39.7)	−1.0 (30.2)	−4.6 (23.7)	−4.6 (23.7)
Average precipitation mm (inches)	32.7 (1.29)	42.9 (1.69)	65.5 (2.58)	113.6 (4.47)	189.6 (7.46)	216.4 (8.52)	226.3 (8.91)	149.3 (5.88)	123.2 (4.85)	110.7 (4.36)	59.6 (2.35)	21.8 (0.86)	1,351.6 (53.22)
Average precipitation days (≥ 0.1 mm)	12.0	11.8	13.9	15.1	17.4	16.8	16.3	13.5	11.8	14.3	11.4	10.0	164.3
Average snowy days	4.9	2.6	0.7	0	0	0	0	0	0	0	0	1.2	9.4
Average relative humidity (%)	82	81	79	80	80	83	82	80	81	84	84	82	82
Mean monthly sunshine hours	39.0	42.5	69.0	96.1	108.7	103.1	156.5	176.9	114.2	81.9	66.5	52.5	1,106.9
Percentage possible sunshine	12	13	19	25	26	25	37	44	31	23	21	17	24
Source: China Meteorological Administration
