= Baojing County =

Baojing County 保靖县 Paotsing
- County
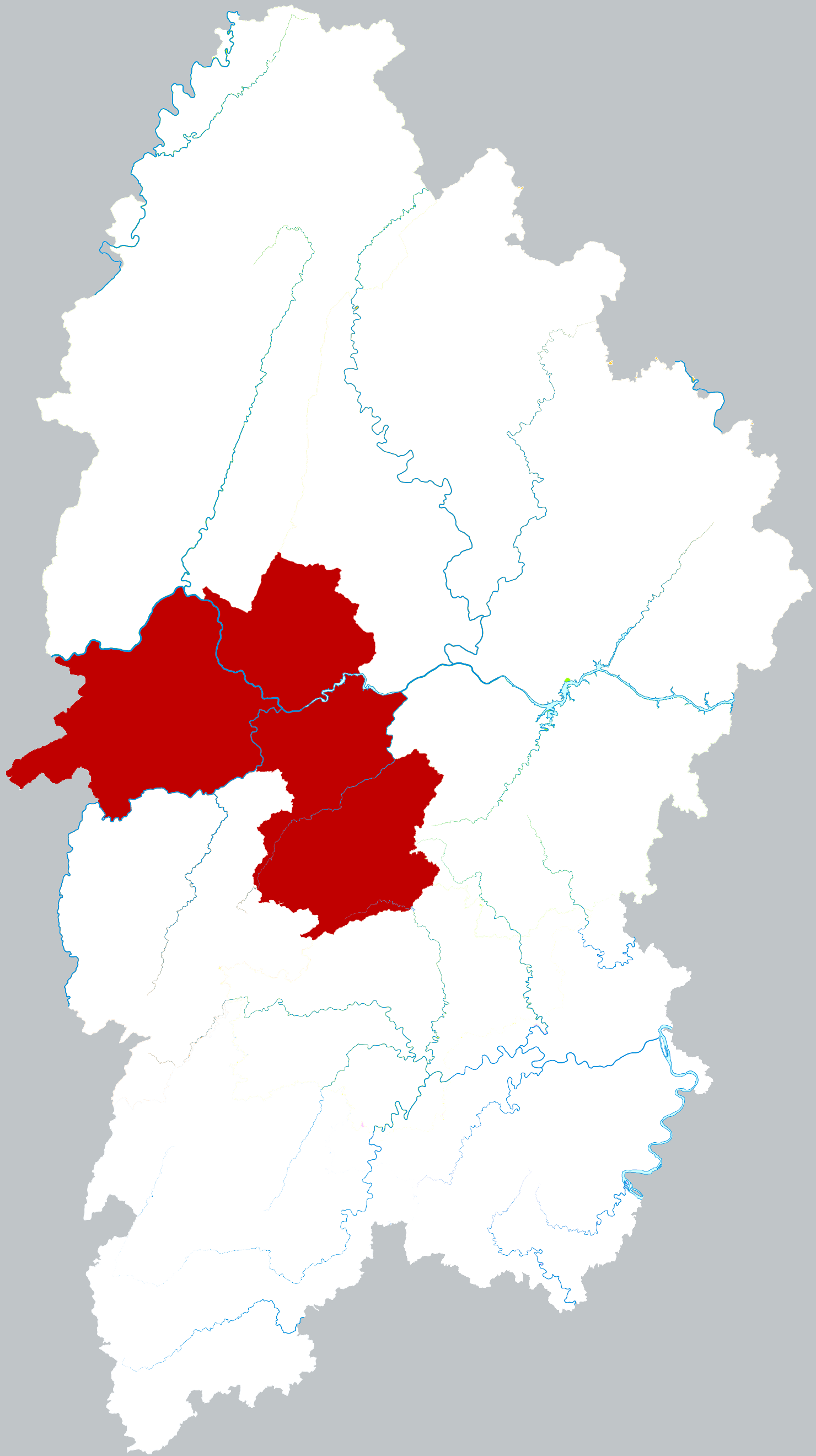
- Location of Baojing County within Xiangxi

- Location in Hunan
- Coordinates: 28°42′32″N 109°39′00″E
- Country: People's Republic of China
- Province: Hunan
- Autonomous prefecture: Xiangxi

Area
  - Total: 1,745.88 km^{2} (674.09 sq mi)

Population (2010)
  - Total: 277,379
  - Density: 158.876/km^{2} (411.488/sq mi)
- Time zone: UTC+8 (China Standard)
- Postal code: 4165XX

Baojing County (simplified Chinese: 保靖县; traditional Chinese: 保靖縣; pinyin: Bǎojìng Xiàn) is a county of Hunan Province, China. It is under the administration of Xiangxi Autonomous Prefecture.

Located in west-central Xiangxi at the western edge of Hunan province, Baojing County is immediately adjacent to the southeast of Chongqing Municipality. The county is bordered to the northwest by Longshan County, to the northeast by Yongshun County, to the east by Guzhang County, to the south by Jishou City and Huayuan County, and to the west by Xiushan County of Chongqing. Baojing County covers an area of 1,745.88 km^{2} (674.09 sq mi), and as of 2015, it had a registered population of 311,200 and a resident population of 294,600. The county has 10 towns and 2 townships under its jurisdiction, and the county seat is Qianling (迁陵镇).

== Climate ==
Climate data for Baojing, elevation 325 m (1,066 ft), (1991–2020 normals, extremes 1981–present)
Month	Jan	Feb	Mar	Apr	May	Jun	Jul	Aug	Sep	Oct	Nov	Dec	Year
Record high °C (°F)	23.2 (73.8)	28.3 (82.9)	32.2 (90.0)	35.0 (95.0)	35.4 (95.7)	36.4 (97.5)	38.7 (101.7)	39.2 (102.6)	37.5 (99.5)	34.0 (93.2)	30.4 (86.7)	22.5 (72.5)	39.2 (102.6)
Mean daily maximum °C (°F)	8.6 (47.5)	11.2 (52.2)	15.9 (60.6)	22.1 (71.8)	26.0 (78.8)	28.9 (84.0)	31.9 (89.4)	32.0 (89.6)	28.2 (82.8)	21.9 (71.4)	16.7 (62.1)	11.1 (52.0)	21.2 (70.2)
Daily mean °C (°F)	5.1 (41.2)	7.2 (45.0)	11.1 (52.0)	16.8 (62.2)	20.8 (69.4)	24.2 (75.6)	26.9 (80.4)	26.6 (79.9)	22.9 (73.2)	17.4 (63.3)	12.2 (54.0)	7.2 (45.0)	16.5 (61.8)
Mean daily minimum °C (°F)	2.6 (36.7)	4.3 (39.7)	7.8 (46.0)	13.1 (55.6)	17.3 (63.1)	20.9 (69.6)	23.3 (73.9)	23.0 (73.4)	19.5 (67.1)	14.5 (58.1)	9.4 (48.9)	4.6 (40.3)	13.4 (56.0)
Record low °C (°F)	−4.1 (24.6)	−3.9 (25.0)	−1.0 (30.2)	3.2 (37.8)	8.6 (47.5)	12.8 (55.0)	17.0 (62.6)	15.1 (59.2)	11.7 (53.1)	5.0 (41.0)	−1.0 (30.2)	−3.7 (25.3)	−4.1 (24.6)
Average precipitation mm (inches)	41.7 (1.64)	45.4 (1.79)	80.6 (3.17)	121.6 (4.79)	200.9 (7.91)	213.8 (8.42)	203.6 (8.02)	141.6 (5.57)	91.1 (3.59)	109.8 (4.32)	66.5 (2.62)	29.1 (1.15)	1,345.7 (52.99)
Average precipitation days (≥ 0.1 mm)	12.3	13.4	16.4	17.4	18.5	17.3	14.8	14.0	10.4	15.2	12.6	11.2	173.5
Average snowy days	5.2	2.9	1.1	0	0	0	0	0	0	0	0.2	1.7	11.1
Average relative humidity (%)	79	79	80	81	82	84	82	80	80	83	83	79	81
Mean monthly sunshine hours	37.2	40.4	62.1	83.0	96.4	93.5	154.4	164.5	111.5	76.7	63.5	48.5	1,031.7
Percentage possible sunshine	11	13	17	21	23	22	36	41	30	22	20	15	23
Source: China Meteorological Administration
