= Xiangxi Tujia and Miao Autonomous Prefecture =

Xiangxi 湘西州
- Autonomous prefecture
Xiangxi Tujia and Miao Autonomous Prefecture
- Chinese: 湘西土家族苗族自治州
- Tujia: Xianxxix bifzivkar befkar zifzifzoux
- Miao: Xangdxid tutjadcul maolcul zibzhibzhoud
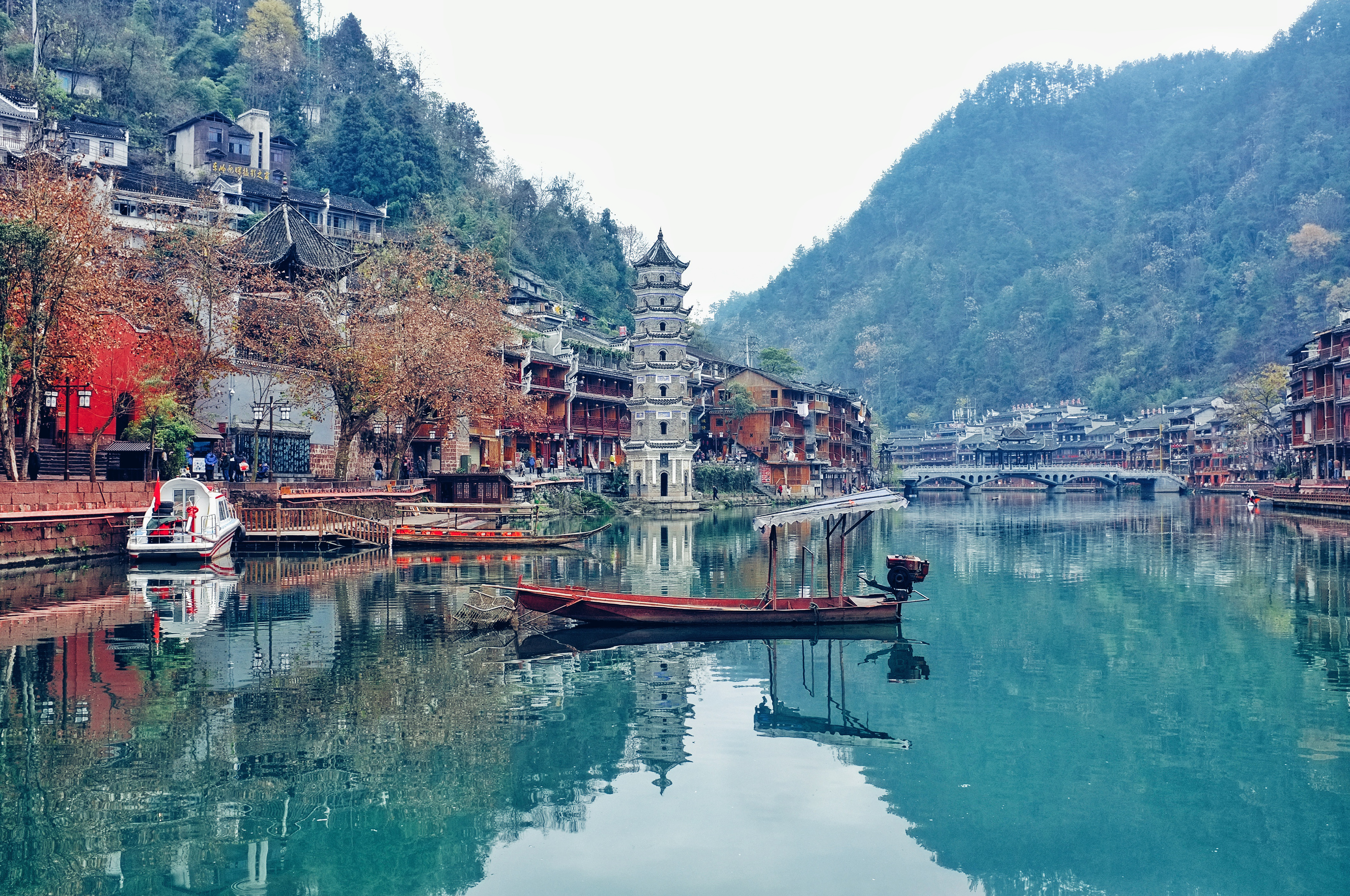
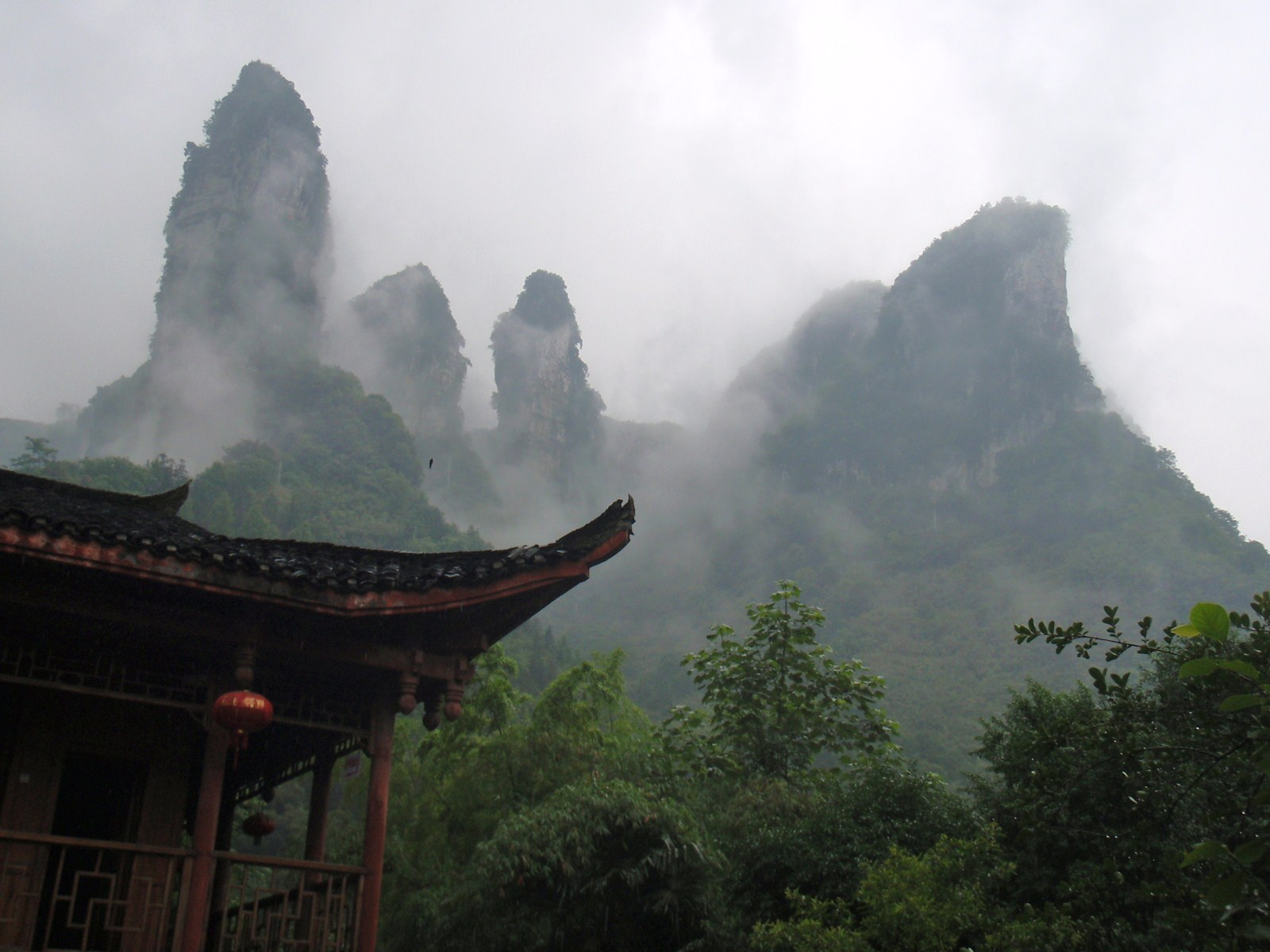
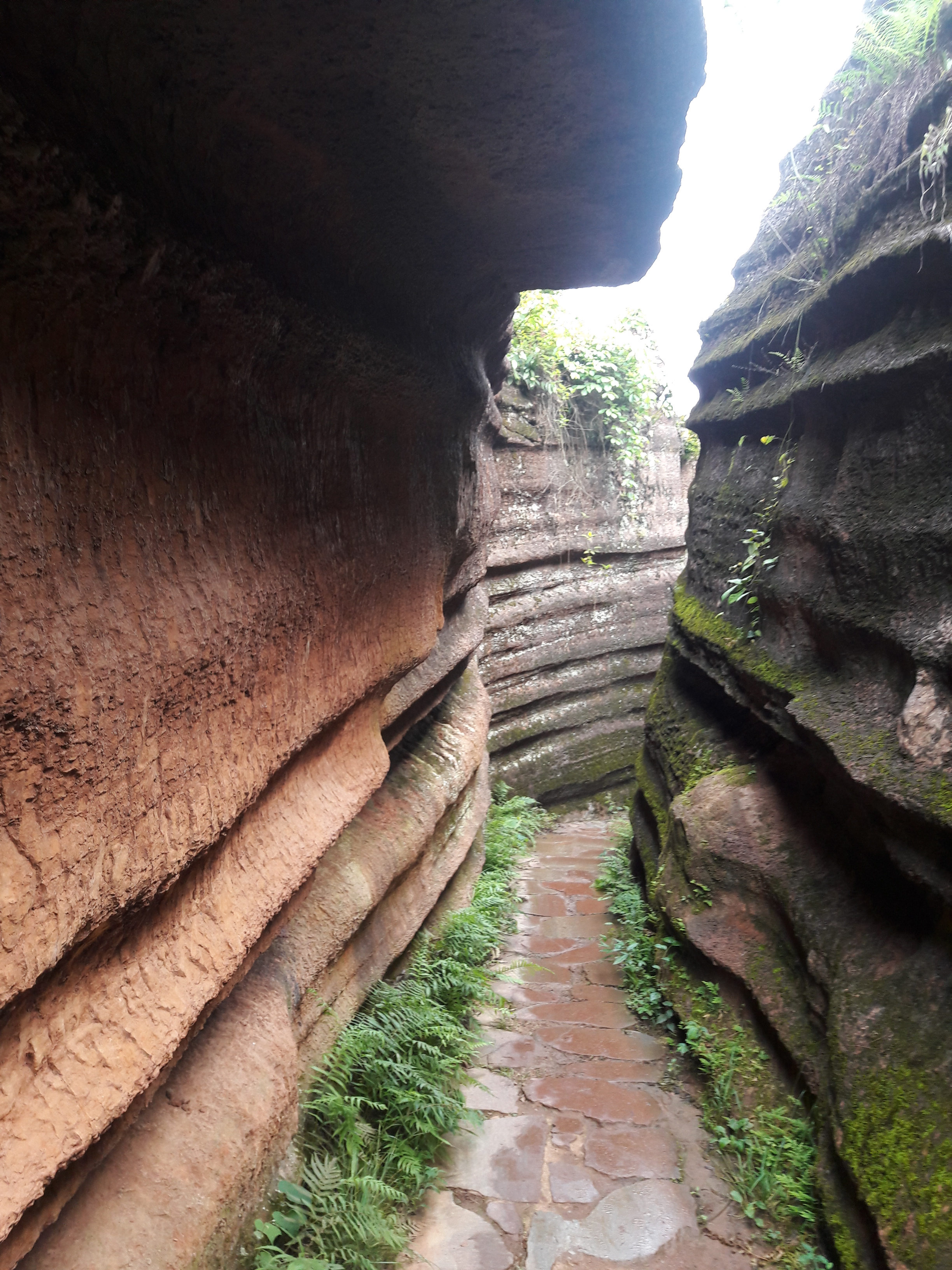
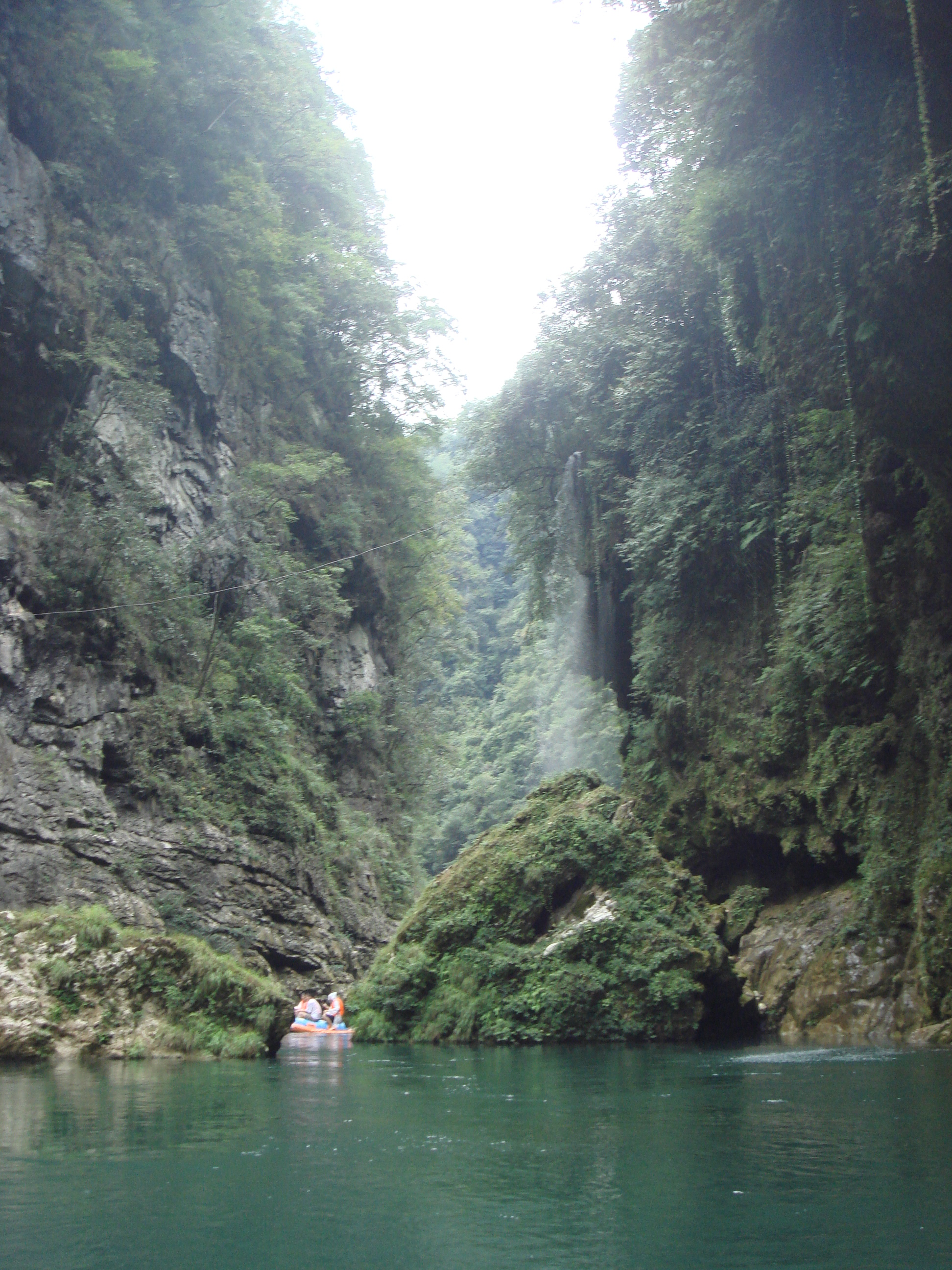
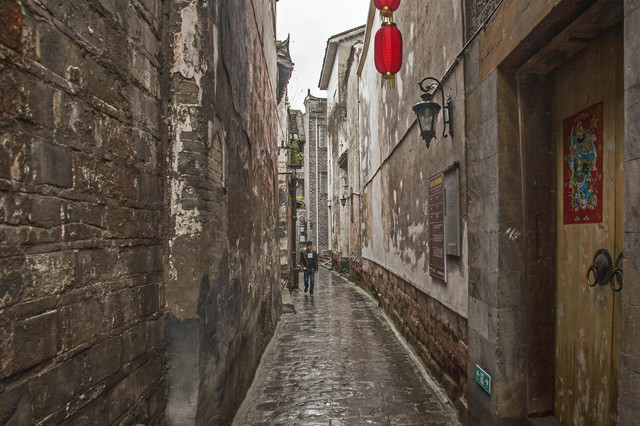
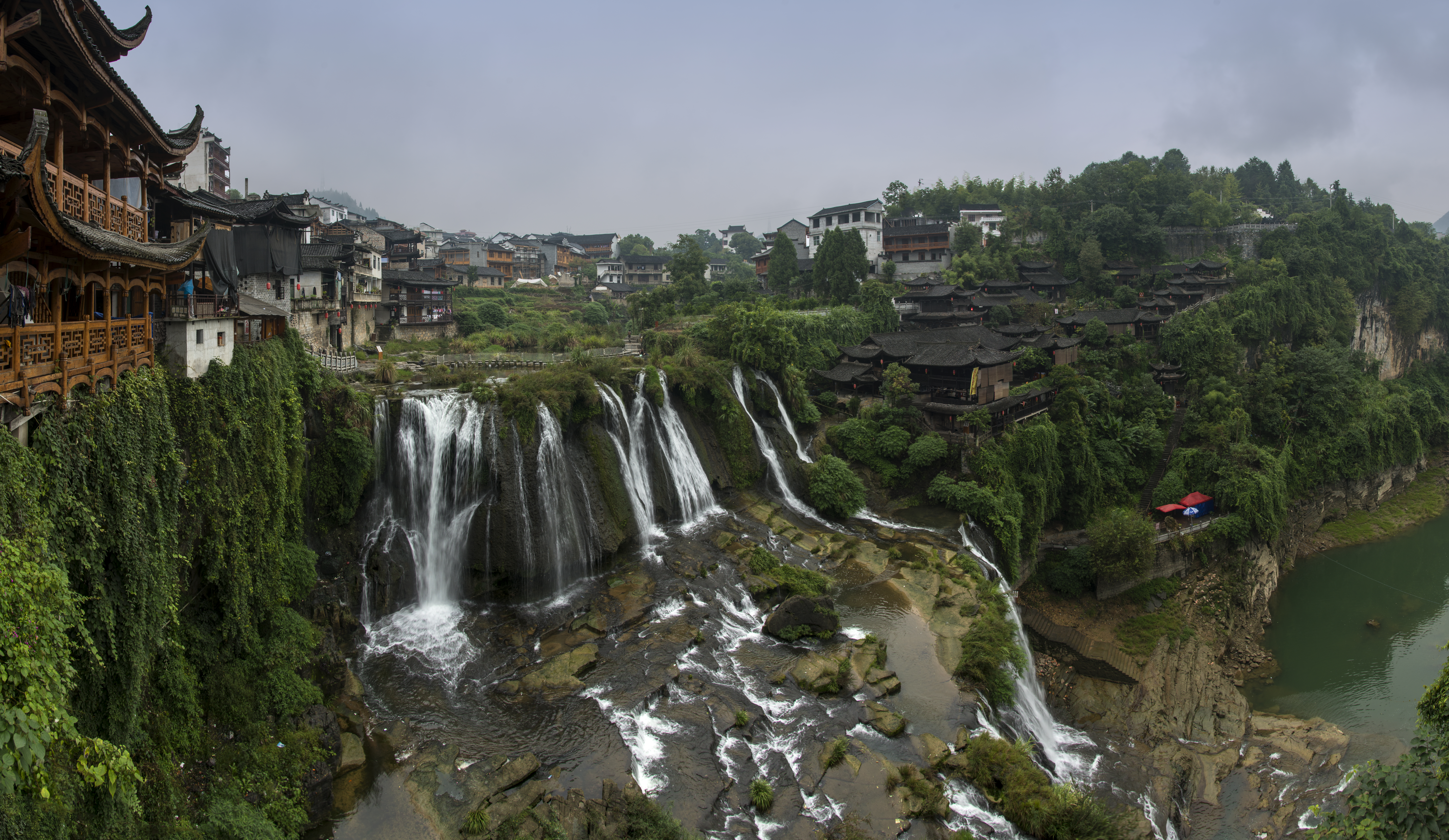
- Fenghuang County Dehang Grand Canyon Hongshilin National Geopark Mengdong River Pushi Town Furong Town

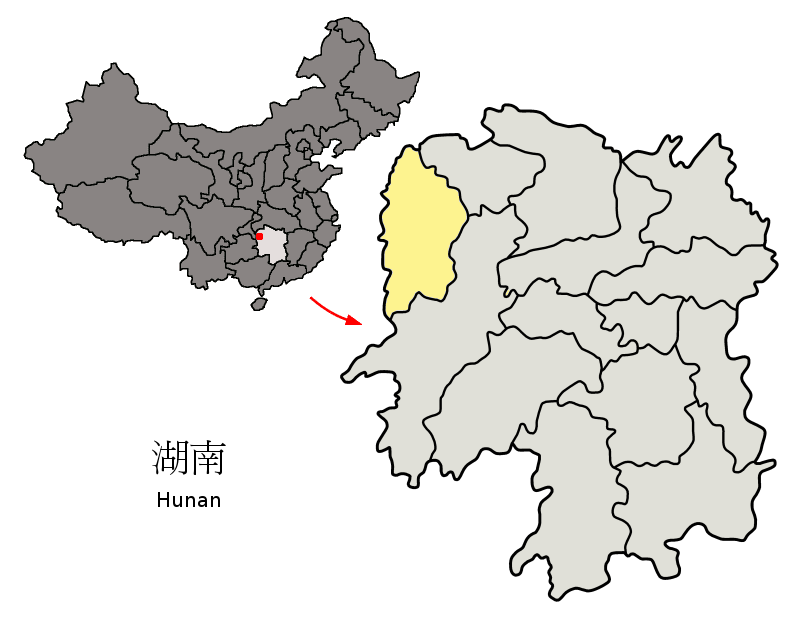
- Location in Hunan
- Coordinates (Xiangxi Prefecture government): 28.31°N 109.74°E
- Country: People's Republic of China
- Province: Hunan
- Seat: Jishou

Area
  - Total: 15,486 km^{2} (5,979 sq mi)

Population (2022)
  - Total: 2,902,000
  - Density: 187.4/km^{2} (485.4/sq mi)

GDP
  - Total: CN¥ 81.8 billion US$ 12.1 billion
  - Per capita: CN¥ 28,170; US$ 4,189
- Time zone: UTC+8 (China Standard)
- ISO 3166 code: CN-HN-31

Xiangxi Tujia and Miao Autonomous Prefecture (Note: Chinese: 湘西土家族苗族自治州; pinyin: Xiāngxī Tǔjiāzú Miáozú Zìzhìzhōu; Tujia: Xianxxix bifzivkar befkar zifzifzoux; Miao: Xangdxid tutjadcul maolcul zibzhibzhoud) is an autonomous prefecture of the People's Republic of China. It is located in northwestern Hunan province. (Note: The name of the prefecture, 湘西, literally means 'Hunan west', 湘 (Xiāng) being an abbreviation for Hunan and 西 (xī) meaning 'west'.) It consists of one city, Jishou, and seven counties: Baojing, Fenghuang, Guzhang, Huayuan, Longshan, Luxi, and Yongshun. Jishou is the capital. Of the 2,480,000 residents, 66.6% are ethnic minorities from 25 different ethnic groups, including 860,000 Tujia and 790,000 Miao.

== History ==
Xiangxi has a long history. The land was sparsely inhabited during the Shang dynasty, through the Warring States period up to the era of the Sui dynasty and Tang dynasty. It fell under the influence of the Chu state during the Warring States era. Later, it became part of the Western and Eastern Han dynasty. After the collapse of the Han dynasty, it came under the control of the Shu dynasty during the Three Kingdoms period of China. Then the area became a subject of the Jin dynasty. When the Yuan dynasty was established, the region became a part of the Hubei province. Soon later, Hubei and Hunan province became one single province called Huguang. The Ming dynasty reestablished the Xiangxi Autonomous Prefecture and attached it to Hunan province.

During the Qing dynasty, Xiangxi continued to be administered as part of Hunan, but due to its mountainous terrain and large Miao and Tujia populations, the region maintained a semi-autonomous status for a long time. The Qing government carried out several "gaitu guiliu" reforms, replacing native chieftains with imperial officials, which gradually strengthened central control but also led to frequent ethnic conflicts and uprisings.

In the late 19th and early 20th centuries, Xiangxi became an important revolutionary base. Many progressive intellectuals and revolutionaries were active in the region, promoting new education and political reforms. During the Republican era, Xiangxi's remote geography made it a strategic area contested by various forces. It later became one of the key revolutionary strongholds of the Communist Party, contributing significantly to the revolutionary movement in southwest China.

After the founding of the People's Republic of China in 1949, Xiangxi underwent major administrative restructuring. In 1957, the Xiangxi Tujia and Miao Autonomous Prefecture was formally established, recognizing the region's ethnic diversity and granting it autonomous administrative rights. Since then, Xiangxi has developed rapidly in transportation, culture, and tourism, while preserving many traditional customs, making it one of China's most distinctive ethnic cultural regions today.

== Geography ==
Western Hunan, also known as "Western Hunan Region" or "Western Hunan", is a collective name for the entire "western region of Hunan" including Zhangjiajie City, Xiangxi Autonomous Prefecture, Huaihua City and the western counties of Shaoyang City (Suining, etc.). This area is surrounded by the two mountains of Wuling and Xuefeng and the Yungui Plateau. It is the place where the upper reaches of Yuanshui and Lishui and their tributaries converge. Economically, this region sometimes includes Zhangjiajie City, Xiangxi Autonomous Prefecture, Huaihua City, Shaoyang City, Loudi City, as well as Jianghua County and Jiangyong County in Yongzhou City, Shimen County and Taoyuan County in Changde City, Anhua County in Yiyang City, etc. Historically, the western part of Hunan belongs to Qianzhong County, Wuling County, Yuanling County, Chenyuan Yongjing Military Reserve Road, Chenyuan Road, Xiangxi Appeasement Office and Xiangxi Administrative Region.

Xiangxi Tujia and Miao Autonomous Prefecture is located in the northwest of Hunan Province, bordered by Sangzhi County and Yongding District of Zhangjiajie City in the northeast; Yuanling County, Chenxi County and Mayang Miao Autonomous County in Huaihua City in the southeast; Songtao Miao Autonomous County in Tongren District, Guizhou Province in the southwest; Xiushan Tujia and Miao Autonomous County in Qianjiang Development Zone, Chongqing in the west. It is adjacent to Laifeng County and Xuanen County, Enshi Tujia and Miao Autonomous Prefecture, Hubei Province. The geographical coordinates are 109°10′-110°22.5′ east longitude and 27°44.5′-29°38′ north latitude. The total area of the administrative area is 15,500 square kilometers.

The western Hunan region in a broad sense not only includes Xiangxi Tujia and Miao Autonomous Prefecture, but also extends to Zhangjiajie City and Huaihua City, covering an area of 78,700 square kilometers. This area is famous for its rich natural resources and unique national culture, including Wulingyuan, Nanshan National Park, Tianmen Mountain and other famous attractions.

== Climate ==
Xiangxi Tujia and Miao Autonomous Prefecture is located in a low-latitude zone and has a humid subtropical monsoon climate. It is characterized by the influence of the topography of the Wuling Mountains: the winter is relatively cold, the summer temperature is high and humid, the spring and summer are wet and rainy, the weather is changeable, the autumn weather turns cooler, the temperature drops, the monsoon is obvious, and the four seasons are distinct. The average temperature for many years is between 16.0~17.0 °C, the average temperature in January is between 4.5~5.2 °C, and the extreme minimum temperature is -15.5 °C (January 30, 1977); the average temperature in July is between 21.9~22.8 °C, and the extreme maximum temperature is 40.6 °C (1959 8 29th of the month). The average annual growth period is 340 days, the annual frost-free period is 282 days, the longest is 340 days, and the shortest is 235 days. The annual sunshine hours are 1151.6~1390.5 hours, and the total annual radiation is 376.6~412.2. Kilojoules/square centimeter. The average annual precipitation is 1284.2~1416.9 mm, and the average annual rainfall days is 171.80 days. The maximum daily precipitation over the years is 344.1 mm, and the minimum daily precipitation over the years is 32.4 mm. Rainfall is concentrated from April to September every year, accounting for 70.8~77.3% of the annual precipitation.

== Human population ==
Based on the results of the Sixth National Census in 2010, the Xiangxi Tujia and Miao Autonomous Prefecture recorded a resident population of 1,967,096. Among them, ethnic minorities accounted for 77.21% of the total. The Tujia population reached 1,089,301 (42.75%), while the Miao population totaled 863,141 (33.88%), reflecting the region's strong ethnic composition.

According to the Seventh National Census conducted at 00:00 on November 1, 2020, the resident population of Xiangxi increased to 2,488,105. Ethnic minorities—mainly Tujia and Miao—further strengthened their demographic presence, comprising 80.5% of the population. This growth indicates steady population expansion and the continued prominence of ethnic groups within the prefecture.

By the end of 2022, Xiangxi's total population reached 2.902 million, with a resident population of 2.461 million. Urbanization continued to advance, as the urban population climbed to 1.285 million and rural residents numbered 1.176 million, bringing the urbanization rate to 52.21%, an increase of 0.64 percentage points over the previous year. In 2022, the prefecture recorded 19,600 births, corresponding to a birth rate of 6.46‰. The annual death toll was 13,500 with a mortality rate of 4.44‰, resulting in a natural population growth rate of 2.02‰.

Overall, these demographic trends show that Xiangxi is experiencing steady population growth, a rising level of urbanization, and sustained ethnic diversity. The prefecture continues to maintain its unique ethnic composition while gradually transitioning toward more modern and balanced population development.

== Economy ==
In 2022, the Xiangxi Tujia and Miao Autonomous Prefecture reached a regional GDP of 81.75 billion yuan, representing a year-on-year increase of 3.8%. The primary industry generated an added value of 12.06 billion yuan, up by 3.1%. The secondary industry contributed 23.74 billion yuan, growing by 1.6%, while the tertiary industry expanded to 45.95 billion yuan, marking a 5.2% increase. In terms of structure, the primary, secondary, and tertiary industries accounted for 14.7%, 29%, and 56.3% of total GDP respectively, with industrial output alone making up 23.1%.

Regarding economic growth contributions, the primary, secondary, and tertiary sectors contributed 12.6%, 12.2%, and 75.2% respectively, highlighting the dominant role of the service sector in driving regional expansion. Industrial activities contributed 5.9% to overall economic growth. Meanwhile, high-tech industries continued to strengthen their presence, achieving an added value of 7.15 billion yuan—an increase of 6.3%—and accounting for 8.7% of the prefecture's GDP.

== Modern reforms ==
In recent decades, Xiangxi Tujia and Miao Autonomous Prefecture has undergone a series of modern reforms aimed at improving livelihoods, strengthening infrastructure, and promoting sustainable development. One of the most significant shifts has been the implementation of targeted poverty alleviation policies. Through improved rural housing, industrial support programs, and employment initiatives, the region successfully lifted large numbers of residents out of absolute poverty, marking a major milestone in social development.

Infrastructure construction has also advanced rapidly. The expansion of highways, high-speed rail links, and modern transportation networks has greatly enhanced regional connectivity, allowing Xiangxi to integrate more closely with the economic circle of western and central China. At the same time, digitalization efforts—such as e-commerce platforms and smart governance systems—have helped modernize administrative services and support local businesses.

Economic reforms emphasize both industrial upgrading and ecological protection. Xiangxi has promoted the growth of characteristic industries such as tourism, cultural creative industries, modern agriculture, and high-tech manufacturing. Guided by the principle of "lucid waters and lush mountains," the prefecture has also strengthened ecological conservation, including river restoration, reforestation, and the construction of national nature reserves. These efforts aim to balance economic development with long-term environmental sustainability.

Culturally, the government has introduced policies to preserve and promote Tujia and Miao heritage through museum projects, intangible cultural heritage protection, and the revitalization of traditional festivals and handicrafts. This cultural revival not only strengthens ethnic identity but also supports tourism and cultural industries.

Overall, modern reforms in Xiangxi reflect a transition from traditional rural development toward a more balanced, sustainable, and culturally distinctive modernization path. The prefecture continues to evolve through improved living standards, diversified industries, and a strategic focus on both innovation and heritage preservation.

=== Crop production ===
Xiangxi's agricultural sector has developed a diverse and well-structured production system. Traditional grain crops such as rice, wheat, corn, and soybeans remain the foundation of regional agriculture, supporting both local consumption and commercial output. In addition to food crops, Xiangxi produces a wide range of industrial and cash crops. Wood, tobacco leaves, and various types of fiber crops contribute to the region's processing industries, supplying raw materials for the production of cigarettes, yarn, and cloth. Modern agricultural inputs such as chemical fertilizers and the region's expanding electricity supply further enhance productivity, while cement and timber support rural infrastructure and construction needs.

In recent years, Xiangxi has also promoted characteristic agriculture—including high-quality rice, tea, Chinese medicinal herbs, edible fungi, and ecological livestock breeding—aiming to upgrade traditional farming into more market-oriented, high-value industries. These agricultural reforms not only diversify rural economic activities but also strengthen the prefecture's integration of agriculture with processing, logistics, and tourism, forming a more efficient and sustainable agricultural economy.

== Administration ==
Map
English	Chinese	Pinyin	Miao	Tujia	Area	Subdivisions				
English	Chinese	Pinyin	Miao	Tujia	Area	Subdistricts	Towns	Townships	Districts	Villages
Xiangxi Tujia Miao Autonomous Zone	湘西土家族 苗族自治州	Xiāngxī Tǔjiāzú; Miáozú Zìzhìzhōu	Xangdxid tutjadcul maolcul zibzhibzhoud	Xianxxix bifzivkar befkar zifzifzoux	15462.30	7	69	89	183	1967
Jishou City	吉首市	Jíshǒu Shì	Jib Soud	Jirsouv sif	1062.46	4	5	7	38	138
Luxi County	泸溪县	Lúxī Xiàn	Lioux Kid	Lurqir xianf	1568.65		8	7	16	134
Fenghuang County	凤凰县	Fènghuáng Xiàn	Jib Zhes	Fongrhuanr xianf	1751.10		9	15	15	344
Huayuan County	花垣县	Huāyuán Xiàn	Jib Yox	Huaxyanr xianf	1111.12		8	10	19	288
Baojing County	保靖县	Bǎojìng Xiàn	Jib Yal	Baovjinf xianf	1745.88		10	6	16	198
Guzhang County	古丈县	Gǔzhàng Xiàn	Bloud Nhol	Guvzanf xianf	1286.23		6	6	18	140
Yongshun County	永顺县	Yǒngshùn Xiàn	Mongl Dongs	Yinvsunf xianf	3809.69		12	18	33	291
Longshan County	龙山县	Lóngshān Xiàn	Gheul Rongx	Longrsanx xianf	3127.16	3	11	20	28	434

== Government ==
The current Communist Party Secretary of Xiangxi Tujia and Miao Autonomous Prefecture is Liu Tao, while the incumbent acting Prefectural Mayor is Shang Shenglong.

== See also ==
- List of township-level divisions of Hunan
