= Tujia people =

Ethnic minority group in China

Tujia
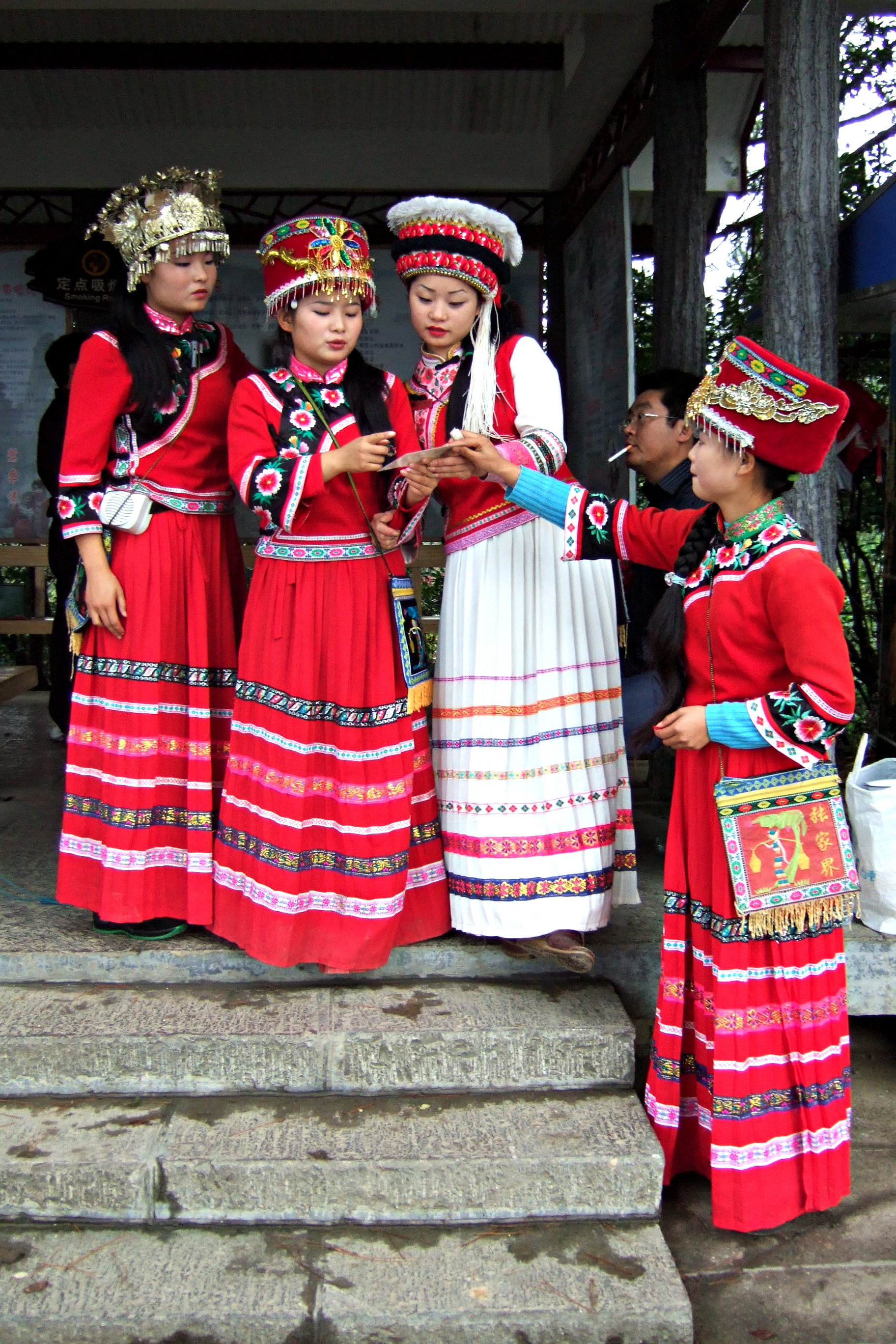
- Tujia women in traditional attire

Total population
- 9,587,732 (2020 census)

Regions with significant populations
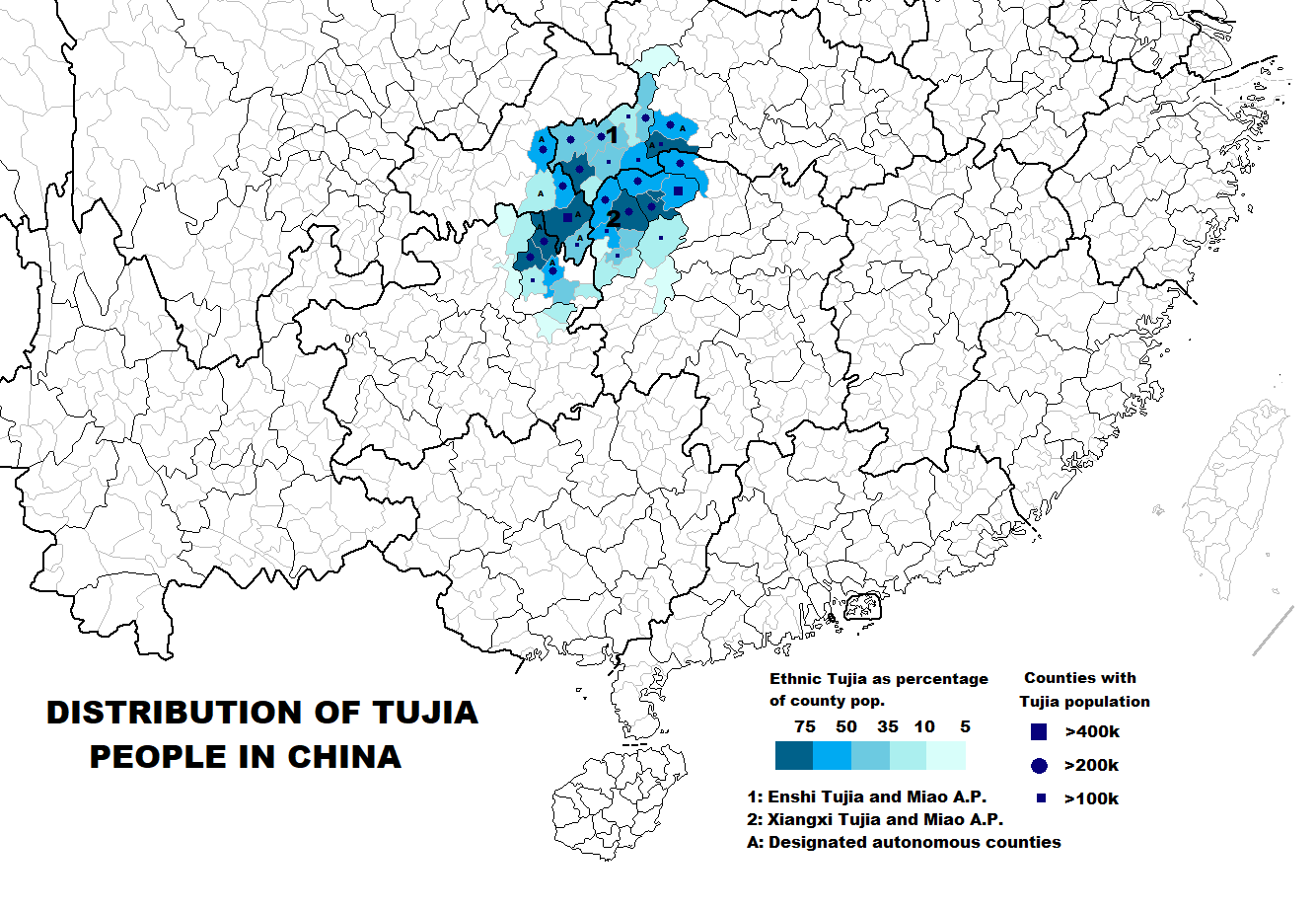
- China (Hunan · Hubei · Guizhou · Chongqing)

Languages
- Mandarin Chinese; Tujia (traditional)

Religion
- Predominantly Nuo folk religion

The Tujia (Northern Tujia: Bifjixkhar / Bifzixkar, IPA: /bi˧˥ dʑi˥ kʰa˨˩/ /pi˧˥ tsi˥ kʰa˨˩/, Southern Tujia: Mongrzzir, /mõ˨˩ dzi˨˩/; Chinese: 土家族; pinyin: Tǔjiāzú) are an ethnic group and, with a total population of over 9 million, the seventh-largest officially recognized ethnic minority in the People's Republic of China. They live in the Wuling Mountains, straddling the common borders of Hunan, Hubei and Guizhou Provinces and Chongqing Municipality.

The endonym Bizika means "native dwellers". In Chinese, Tujia literally means "local families", in contrast to the Hakka (客家; Kèjiā), whose name literally means "guest families" and implies migration.

== History ==
=== Origin ===
Although there are different accounts of their origins, the Tujia may trace their history back over twelve centuries, and possibly beyond to the ancient Ba people who occupied the area around modern-day Chongqing some 2,500 years ago. The Ba Kingdom reached the zenith of its power between 600 BC and 400 BC but was annexed by the Qin in 316 BC.

After being referred to by a long succession of different names in ancient documents, the Tujia appeared in historical records from about 14th century onwards.

=== Ming and Qing dynasties ===
The Tujia tusi chieftains reached the zenith of their power under the Ming dynasty (1368–1644), when they were accorded comparatively high status by the imperial court. They achieved this through their reputation as providers of fierce, highly disciplined fighting men, who were employed by the emperor to suppress revolts by other minorities. On numerous occasions, they helped defend China against outside invaders, such as the wokou ("Japanese" pirates) who ravaged the coast during the 16th century.

The Manchus invaded and conquered the Ming in 1644 and established the Great Qing Empire, known in China as the Qing dynasty. Ever suspicious of local rulers, the Qing emperors always tried to replace Han officials with Manchu officials wherever they could. In the early 18th century, the Qing court finally felt secure enough to establish direct control over minority areas as well. This process, known as gaituguiliu (literally 'replace the local [ruler], return to mainstream [central rule]'), was carried out throughout South-West China gradually and, in general, peacefully. The court adopted a carrot and stick approach of lavish pensions for compliant chieftains, coupled with a huge show of military force on the borders of their territories.

Most of the Tujia areas returned to central control during the period 1728–1735. While the rule of the Qing government was more orderly compared to the rule of chieftains, many in the Tujia peasantry came to resent the attempts of the Qing court to impose national culture and customs on them. With the weakening of central Qing rule, numerous large-scale uprisings occurred, culminating in the violent Taiping Rebellion.

=== Recent history ===
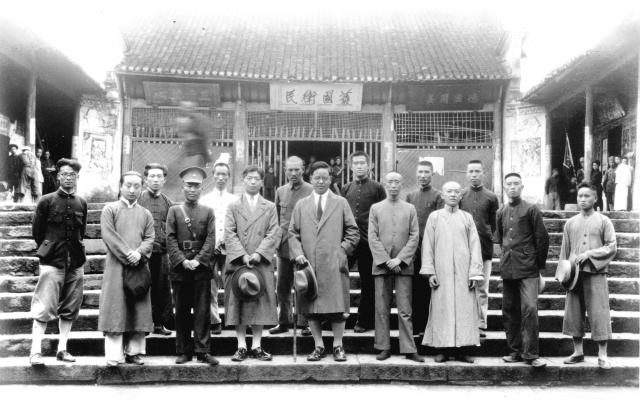
Anthropologists Ling Chunsheng, Rui Yifu and Yong Shiheng visited Liaojia Town, Fenghuang County as part of a field work on Tujia ethnicity in China

Following the collapse of the Qing, the Tujia found themselves caught between various competing warlords. More and more land was given over to the cultivation of high-earning opium at the insistence of wealthy landlords and banditry was rife. After the founding of the People's Republic of China in 1949, Tujia areas came under communist control and banditry was rapidly eradicated. The Great Leap Forward led to mass famine in Tujia communities.

The Tujia were officially recognized as one of the 55 ethnic minorities in January 1957 and a number of autonomous prefectures and counties were subsequently established.

State Councillor Dai Bingguo, one of China's top officials on foreign policy, is the most prominent Tujia in the Chinese government.

== Culture ==
=== Special features ===
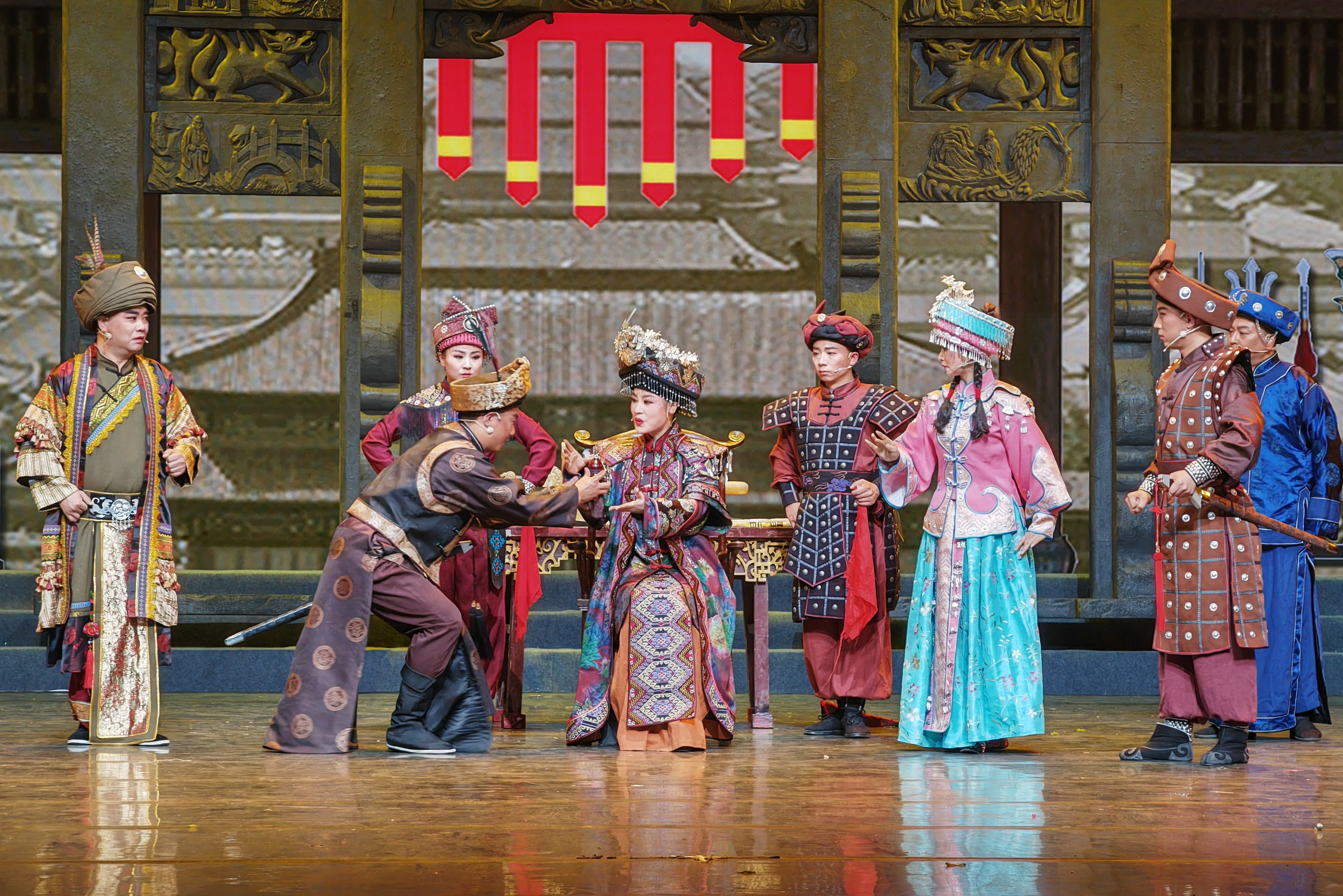
Traditional Tujia opera, Nanju, being played in Xianfeng County, Enshi Tujia and Miao Autonomous Prefecture

Today, traditional Tujia customs can only be found in the most remote areas. The Tujia are renowned for their singing and song composing abilities and for their tradition of the Baishou dance (摆手舞), a 500-year-old collective dance which uses 70 ritual gestures to represent war, farming, hunting, courtship and other aspects of traditional life. They are also famous for their richly patterned brocade, known as xilankapu, a product that in earlier days regularly figured in their tribute payments to the Chinese court. For their spring festival they prepare handmade glutinous rice cakes called ciba cake. They gather round the fire to sing folk songs and eat grilled ciba. The hand-waving sacrifice (Chinese: 摆手祭) is a large-scale sacrificial ceremony passed down from ancient times by the Tujia ethnic group, integrating religion, sacrifice, dance, drama, and other cultural forms. It is also the Tujia ethnic group's most sacred traditional festival.

=== Lifestyle and customs ===
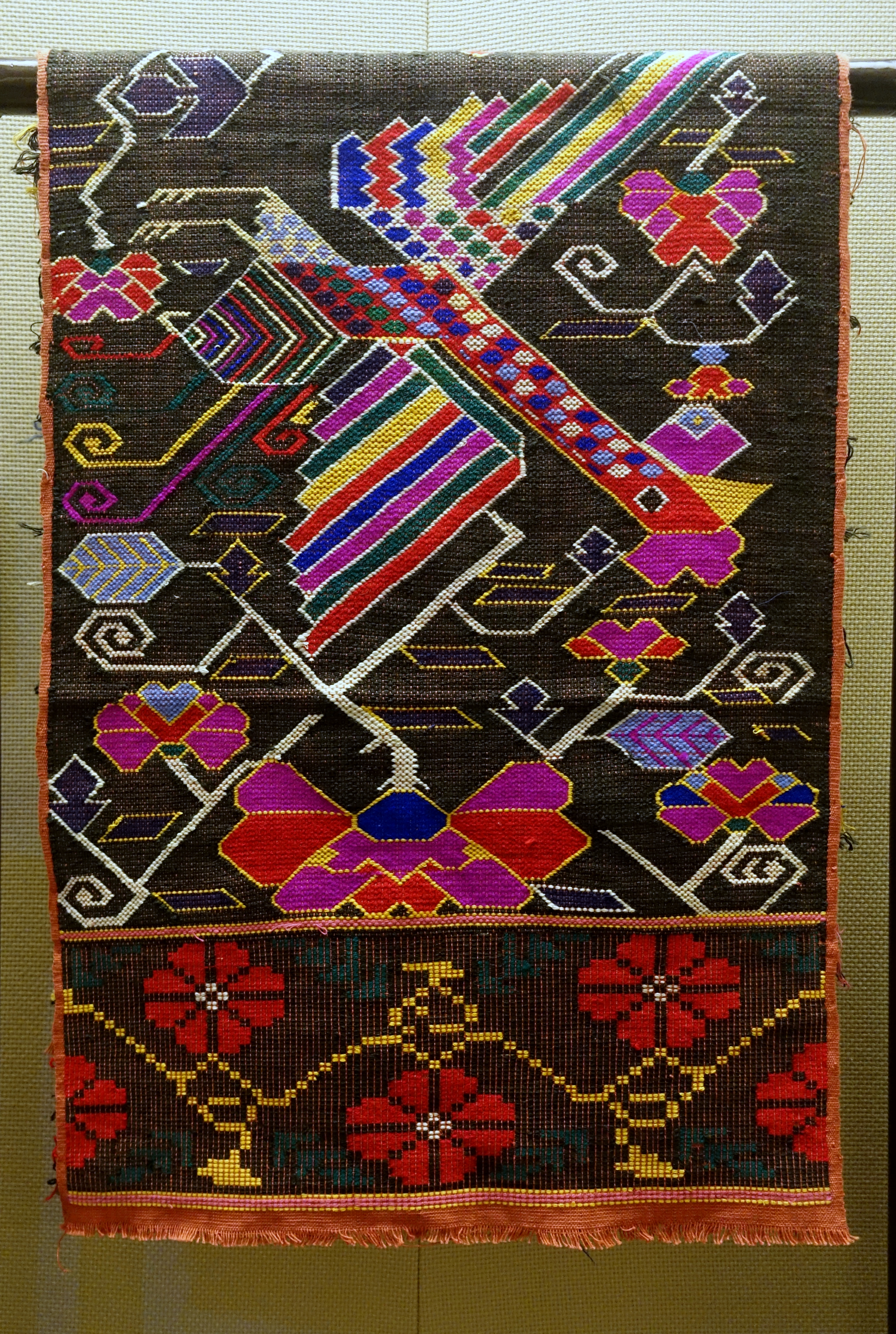
Tujia brocade

The Tujia people traditionally exhibit distinctly different ways of life depending on their geographical environment.

Lowland Tujia mainly inhabit hilly river-valley areas below 500 meters in elevation. Their staple food is rice, supplemented with wheat and other grains. They favor raising domestic fowl and livestock, and fishing is also well developed. Among the three Tujia subgroups, the lowland Tujia enjoy the greatest material abundance. Exquisite traditional handicrafts such as Tujia brocade (Xilankapu) originate from the lowland Tujia tradition.

Mountain Tujia primarily live in alpine gorge regions between 500 and 2,500 meters in elevation. Their diet mainly consists of mixed grains, including both lowland crops such as rice and highland crops such as wheat, barley, and buckwheat. They also raise livestock and poultry, and sometimes graze cattle and sheep. Their lifestyle combines characteristics of both the lowland and high-altitude Tujia populations, while also exhibiting their own distinctive traits—there is a strong hunting tradition among the mountain Tujia. Before the mid-20th century, nearly every household owned a hunting rifle, and boys would accompany their fathers into the mountains to hunt from a young age. Among the three groups, they are regarded as the most bold and vigorous. Because they historically served as intermediaries between the highlands and lowlands, caravan transport and trade were once widespread among the mountain Tujia.

Plateau Tujia mainly inhabit plateau regions above 1,000 meters in elevation. Their staple foods are primarily highland crops such as buckwheat. While they herd sheep, some also raise small numbers of chickens, pigs, and other animals. However, due to natural conditions such as water scarcity and severe cold, their living environment is harsher than that of the other two Tujia groups. As a result, their population has historically remained small, and life has long been relatively difficult.

== Language ==
Tujia is a Sino-Tibetan language and is usually considered an isolate within this group. It has some grammatical and phonological similarities with Nuosu, though its vocabulary is very different.

Today there are at most 70,000 native speakers of the Tujia language, most of whom live in the northern parts Xiangxi Tujia and Miao Autonomous Prefecture in North-Western Hunan Province.

The vast majority of the Tujia use varieties of Chinese, mainly Southwestern Mandarin; a few speak Hmongic languages. Few monolingual Tujia speakers remain; nearly all are bilingual in some dialect of Chinese. Children now learn Chinese from childhood and many young Tujia prefer to use Chinese when communicating among themselves. Among fluent Tujia speakers, Chinese borrowings and even sentence structures, are more common.

== Distribution ==
=== By province ===
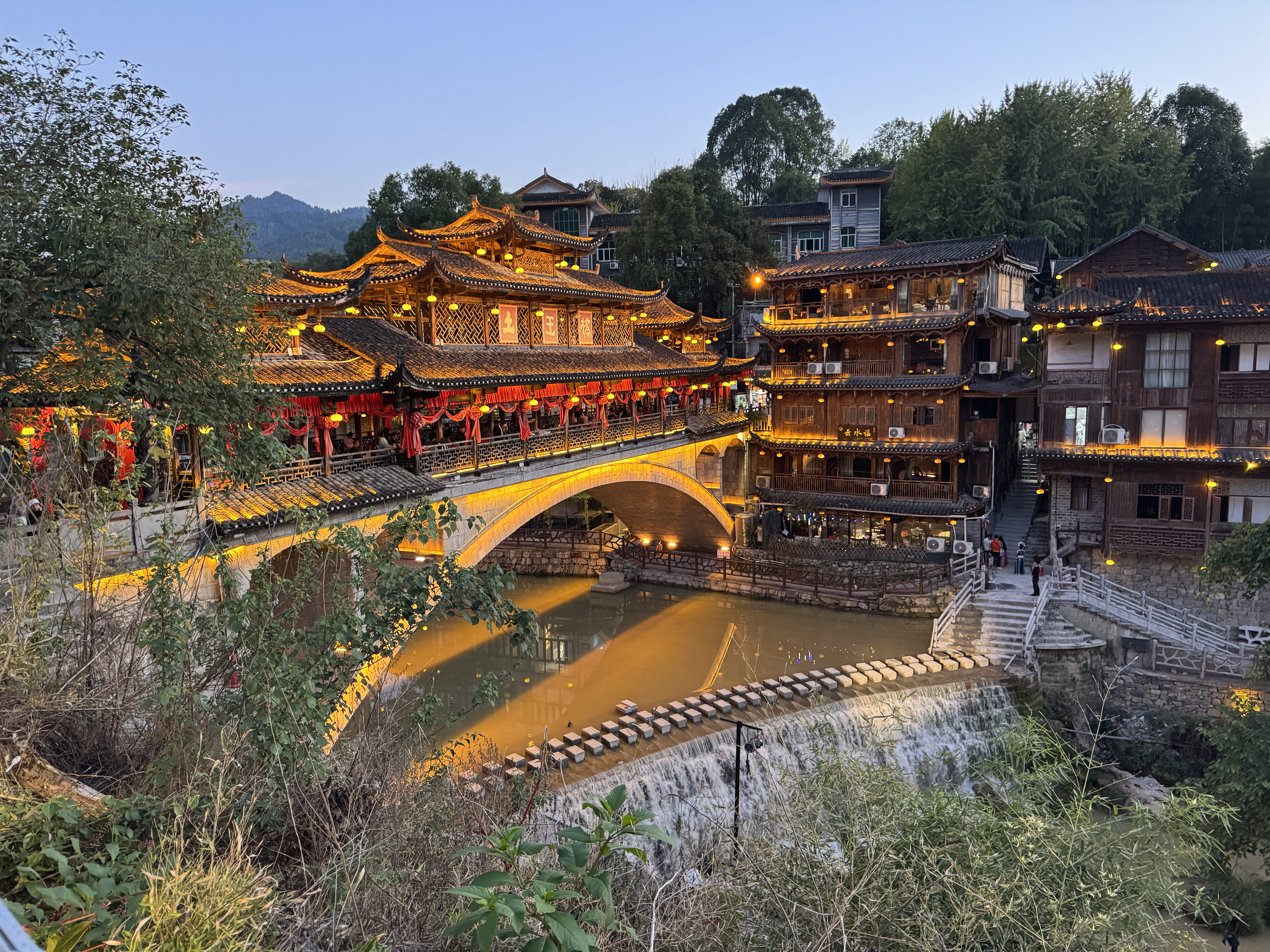
Furong, an ancient town with major residents being Tujia, is located in Yongshun County of Xiangxi, Hunan

The Census of 2020 recorded 9,587,732 Tujia in China. The three provinces of Hunan, Hubei, and Guizhou, as well as Chongqing Municipality, are the hereditary homelands of the Tujia people. These four provincial-level regions are home to 85.97% of the Tujia population, with the remainder scattered across other areas.

Hunan Province has 2,713,005 Tujia people, making it the province with the largest Tujia population; the Tujia are also the second-largest ethnic group in Hunan. The Tujia of Hunan are distributed across 18 county-level administrative divisions, including: the entirety of the 8 counties and county-level cities of the Xiangxi Tujia and Miao Autonomous Prefecture, all 4 districts and counties of Zhangjiajie, Shimen County and Taoyuan County in Changde, and Yuanling County, Zhijiang Dong Autonomous County, Xupu County, and Mayang Miao Autonomous County in Huaihua. At present, daily use of the Tujia language is preserved only in certain Tujia-settled areas of Xiangxi Prefecture in Hunan.

Hubei Province has 2,285,834 Tujia, making it the province with the second-largest Tujia population; the Tujia are also the second-largest ethnic group in Hubei. The Tujia of Hubei are distributed across 16 county-level administrative divisions, including: the full territory of 8 counties and county-level cities in the Enshi Tujia and Miao Autonomous Prefecture, Wufeng Tujia Autonomous County, Changyang Tujia Autonomous County, and Yidu in Yichang, Songzi in Jingzhou, and the Shennongjia Forestry District. There are also mixed-settlement areas including Xingshan, Zigui County, and Zhicheng.

Guizhou Province has 1,696,664 Tujia, making it the province with the third-largest Tujia population; the Tujia are the fourth-largest ethnic group in Guizhou, following the Han Chinese, Miao, and Bouyei. The Tujia of Guizhou are primarily distributed across 11 county-level divisions in 3 prefectures, including: Yinjiang Tujia and Miao Autonomous County and Yanhe Tujia Autonomous County—two Tujia autonomous counties—along with Bijiang District, Jiangkou County, Sinan County, and Dejiang County, for a total of six county-level divisions in Tongren; Daozhen Gelao and Miao Autonomous County in Zunyi; and Cengong County and Zhenyuan County in the Qiandongnan Miao and Dong Autonomous Prefecture.

Chongqing Municipality has 1,546,988 Tujia, making it the provincial-level region with the fourth-largest Tujia population; the Tujia are also the second-largest ethnic group in Chongqing. The Tujia in Chongqing are mainly distributed across 11 districts and counties, including the four autonomous counties of Shizhu, Xiushan, Youyang, and Pengshui, as well as Qianjiang District, which holds autonomous status. There are also mixed-settlement areas including Wushan County, Fengjie County, and Wanzhou District.

Provincial Distribution of the Tujia

Province	Tujia Population	% of Total
Hunan	2,713,005	28.3%
Hubei	2,285,834	23.8%
Guizhou	1,696,664	17.7%
Chongqing	1,546,988	16.1%
Guangdong	430,936	4.5%
Zhejiang	318,881	3.3%
Fujian	142,673	1.5%
Sichuan	87,912	0.9%
Other	364,839	3.8%

In Chongqing, Tujia make up 4.67% of the total population; in Hunan, 4.17%; in Guizhou, 4.06%; in Hubei, 3.66%; and in Guangdong, 0.16%.

=== By county ===
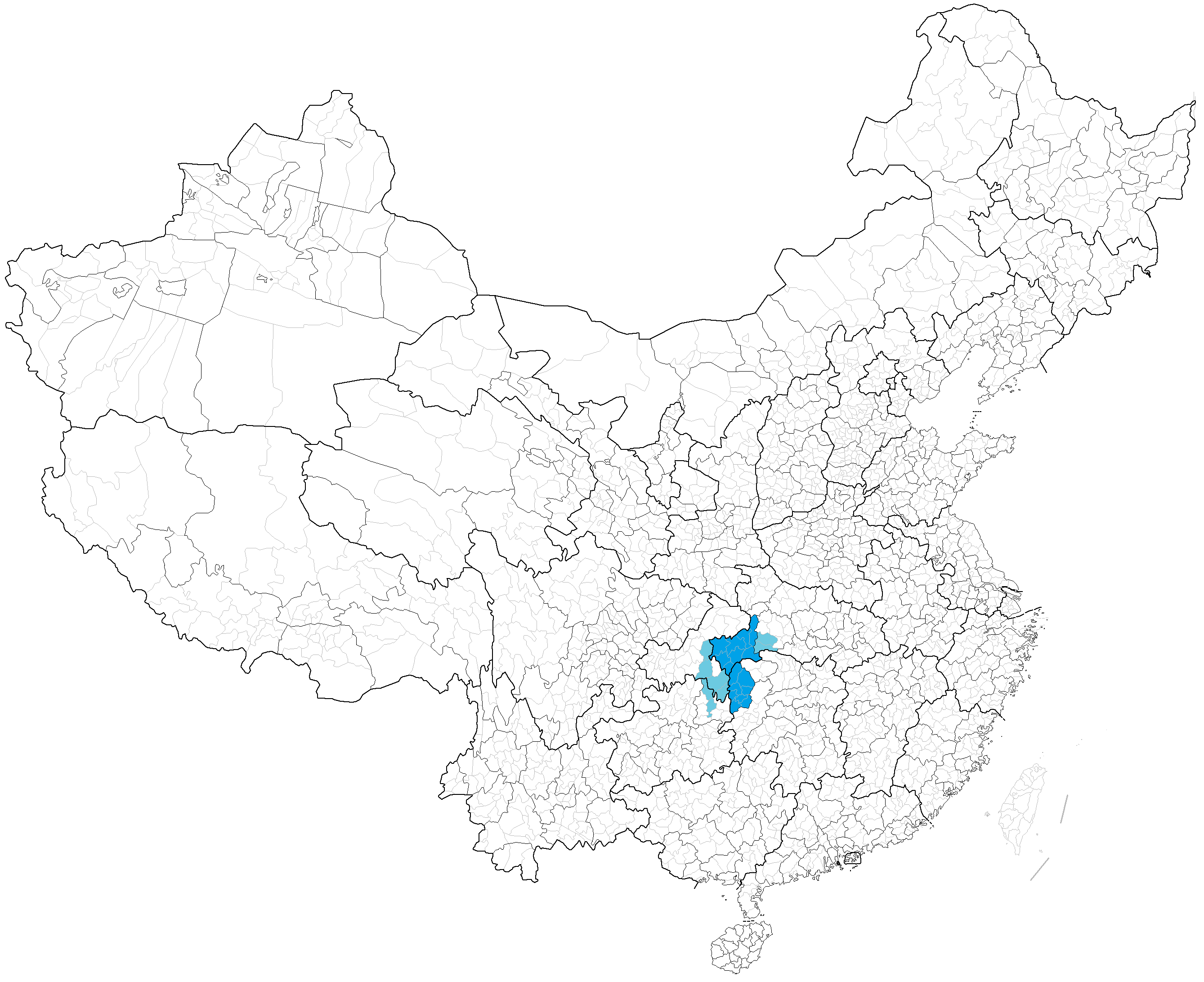
Tujia autonomous prefectures and counties in China.

County-level distributions of the Tujia

(Only includes counties or county-equivalents containing >0.5% of China's Tujia population.)

Province	Prefecture	County	Tujia Population	% of China's Tujia Population
Chongqing	Same	Youyang	462,444	5.76%
Hunan	Zhangjiajie	Cili	399,906	4.98%
Hubei	Enshi	Lichuan	388,035	4.83%
Hunan	Changde	Shimen	387,480	4.83%
Guizhou	Tongren	Yanhe Tujia Autonomous County	383,499	4.78%
Chongqing	same	Shizhu	348,790	4.34%
Hunan	Xiangxi	Yongshun	342,570	4.27%
Hunan	Zhangjiajie	Yongding	319,330	3.98%
Guizhou	Tongren	Dejiang	300,432	3.74%
Hubei	Enshi	Xianfeng	276,394	3.44%
Hubei	Enshi	Enshi	270,753	3.37%
Chongqing	Same	Qianjiang	261,327	3.26%
Hunan	Zhangjiajie	Sangzhi	260,092	3.24%
Hunan	Xiangxi	Longshan	251,007	3.13%
Guizhou	Tongren	Yinjiang	233,802	2.91%
Hubei	Enshi	Badong	212,424	2.65%
Hubei	Yichang	Changyang	211,129	2.63%
Chongqing	Same	Xiushan	197,570	2.46%
Hubei	Yichang	Wufeng	174,546	2.17%
Hubei	Enshi	Jianshi	173,984	2.17%
Guizhou	Tongren	Sinan	160,089	1.99%
Hunan	Xiangxi	Baojing	148,291	1.85%
Hubei	Enshi	Hefeng	142,805	1.78%
Hubei	Enshi	Xuan'en	140,837	1.75%
Hunan	Xiangxi	Jishou	103,242	1.29%
Hunan	Huaihua	Yuanling	102,636	1.28%
Hubei	Enshi	Laifeng	93,471	1.16%
Guizhou	Tongren	Jiangkou	77,791	0.97%
Chongqing	Same	Pengshui	74,591	0.93%
Guizhou	Tongren	Tongren	70,286	0.88%
Hunan	Xiangxi	Fenghuang	64,727	0.81%
Hunan	Xiangxi	Guzhang	47,162	0.59%
Guizhou	Zunyi	Wuchuan	46,253	0.58%
Hunan	Huaihua	Xupu	45,900	0.57%
Hunan	Zhangjiajie	Wulingyuan	41,910	0.52%
Hunan	Xiangxi	Luxi	40,643	0.51%
Other	—	—	771,985	9.62%

=== Autonomous areas ===
Here is the list of autonomous areas designated for Tujia people.

Province-level Division	Name
Hunan	Xiangxi Tujia and Miao Autonomous Prefecture
Hubei	Enshi Tujia and Miao Autonomous Prefecture
Hubei	Changyang Tujia Autonomous County
Hubei	Wufeng Tujia Autonomous County
Chongqing	Shizhu Tujia Autonomous County
Chongqing	Pengshui Miao and Tujia Autonomous County
Chongqing	Xiushan Tujia and Miao Autonomous County
Chongqing	Youyang Tujia and Miao Autonomous County
Chongqing	Qianjiang District (former Qianjiang Tujia and Miao Autonomous County)
Guizhou	Yanhe Tujia Autonomous County
Guizhou	Yinjiang Tujia and Miao Autonomous County

== Famous Tujia people ==
Famous Tujia people

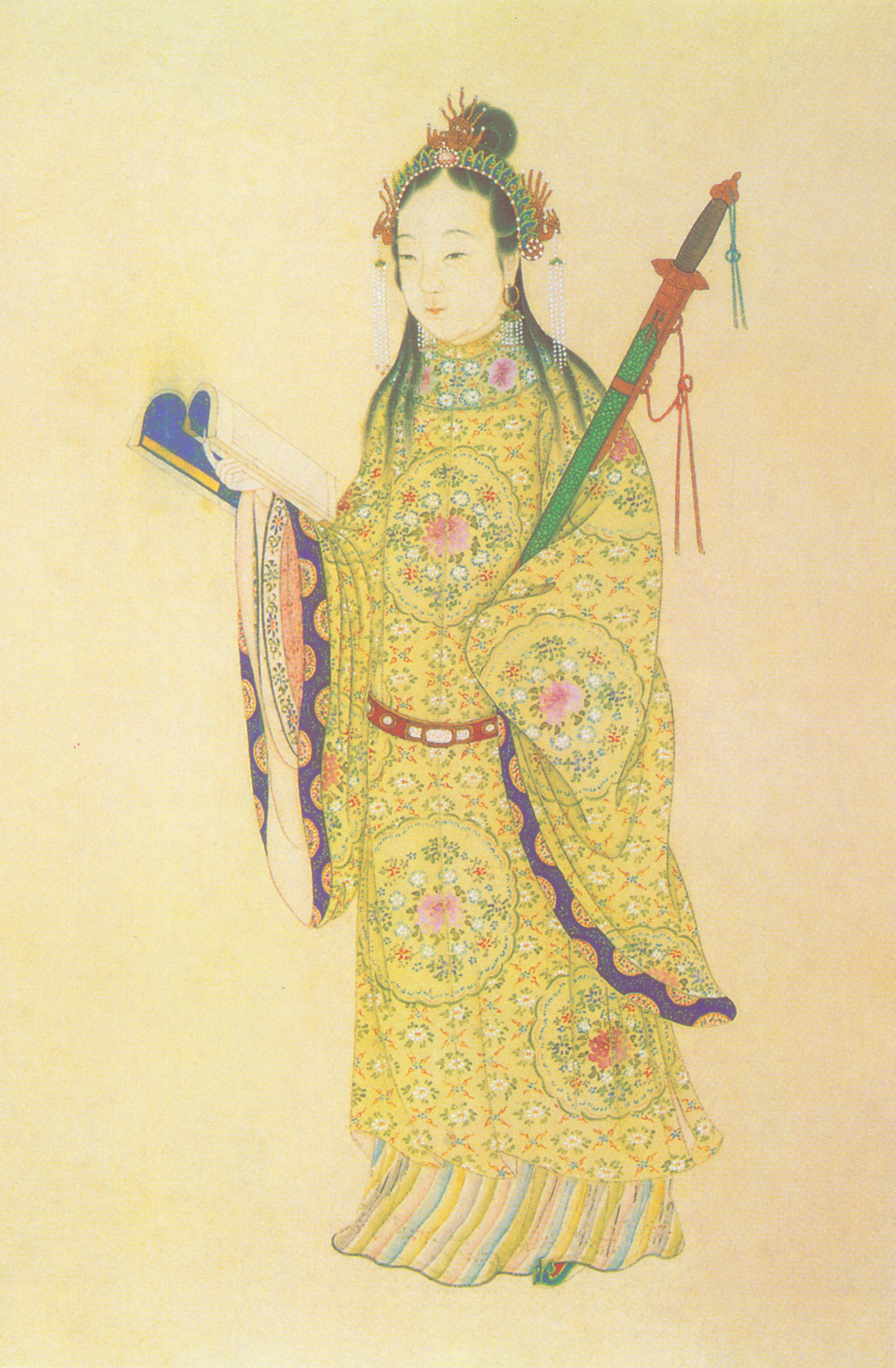
Qin Liangyu

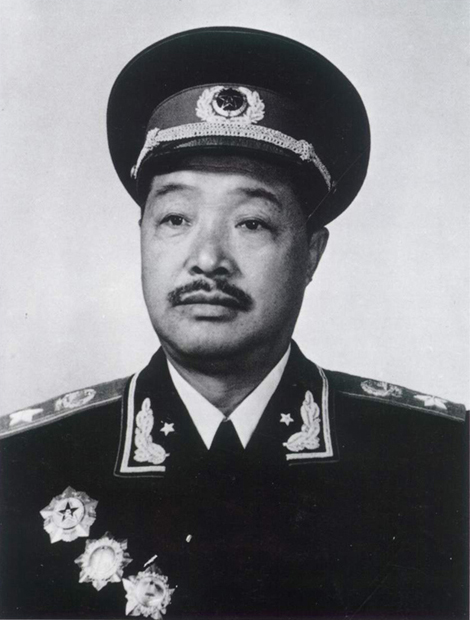
He Long

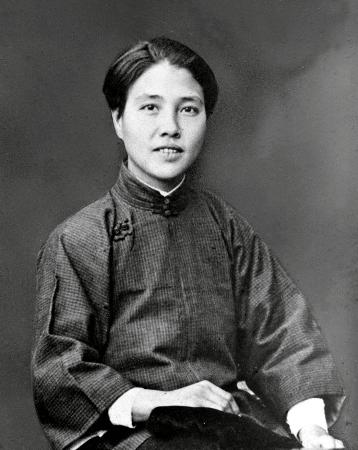
Xiang Jingyu

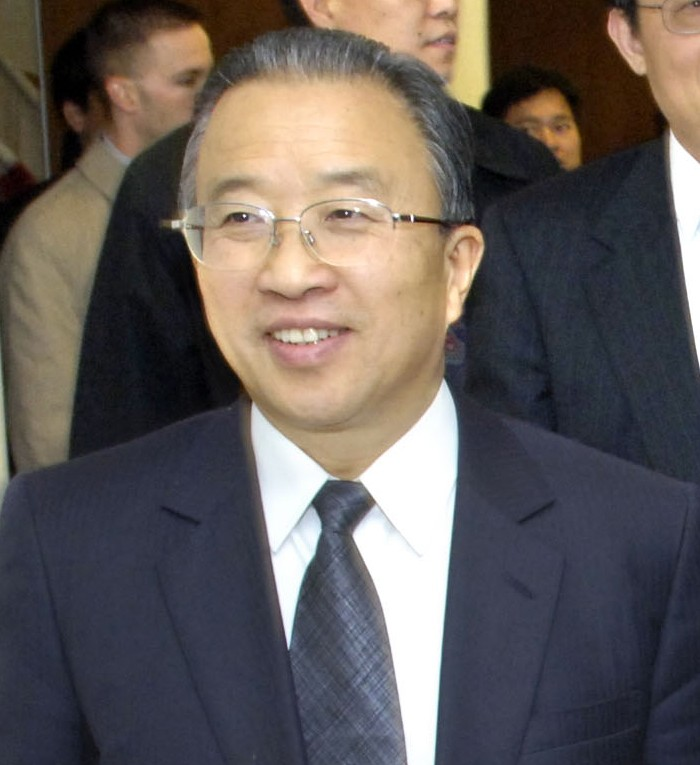
Dai Bingguo

Historically, Tujia people were highly sinicized, and had produced many outstanding talents.

- Dai Bingguo, diplomat of Wen Jiabao administration
- Lan Xiya, actress
- Leo Li, actress and singer
- Liao Guoxun, former mayor of Tianjin
- Ren Zhenhe, former governor of Gansu
- Shang Chunsong, artistic gymnast and traceur, Olympic medalist
- Shen Mengchen, actress
- He Long, marshal of PRC
- Tian Tao, Olympic weightlifter
- Zhou Xianwang, Mayor of Wuhan
- Zhang Ju, musician
- Huang Yongyu, painter
- Ron Monroe, Chinese actress and singer based in Japan
- Xiang Xuan, general of People's Liberation Army
- Qin Haiyang, athlete and Olympic medalist
