= Wufeng =

Wufeng may refer to:

== Places ==
=== Mainland China ===
- Wufeng Tujia Autonomous County, county in Hubei
- Wufeng Township, Hubei (五峰乡), township in Shiyan, Hubei
- Wufeng Subdistrict (五凤街道), subdistrict in Gulou District, Fuzhou, Fujian
- Wufeng station (五凤站), metro station in Guangzhou, Guangdong

==== Towns ====
- Wufeng, Yongchun County (吾锋), town in Yongchun County, Fujian
- Wufeng, Wufeng County (五峰), town in and seat of Wufeng Tujia Autonomous County, Hubei
- Wufeng, Jiangxi (五丰), town in Wan'an County, Jiangxi
- Wufeng, Liaoning (五峰), town in Zhangwu County, Liaoning
- Wufeng, Qinghai (五峰), town in Huzhu Tu Autonomous County, Qinghai

=== Taiwan ===
- Wufeng, Hsinchu, town in Hsinchu County
- Wufeng, Taichung, district in Taichung
- WuFeng University, private university in Chiayi

== Historical eras ==
- Wufeng (五鳳, 57BC–54BC), an era name used by Emperor Xuan of Han
- Wufeng (五鳳, 254–256), an era name used by Sun Liang, emperor of Eastern Wu
- Wufeng (五鳳, 618–621), an era name used by Dou Jiande

== See also ==
- Wu Feng (disambiguation)
