= SZF =

SZF may refer to:

- Samsun-Çarşamba Airport (IATA: SZF), a public airport in Samsun, Turkey
- Songzi (Division code: SZF), a city in the southwest of Hubei province, People's Republic of China
