= Youyang Tujia and Miao Autonomous County =

Youyang 酉阳县 · youvyanr xanf Yuyang
- Autonomous County
- 酉阳土家族苗族自治县 youvyanr bifzivkar befkar zifzifxanf Youyang Tujia and Miao Autonomous County
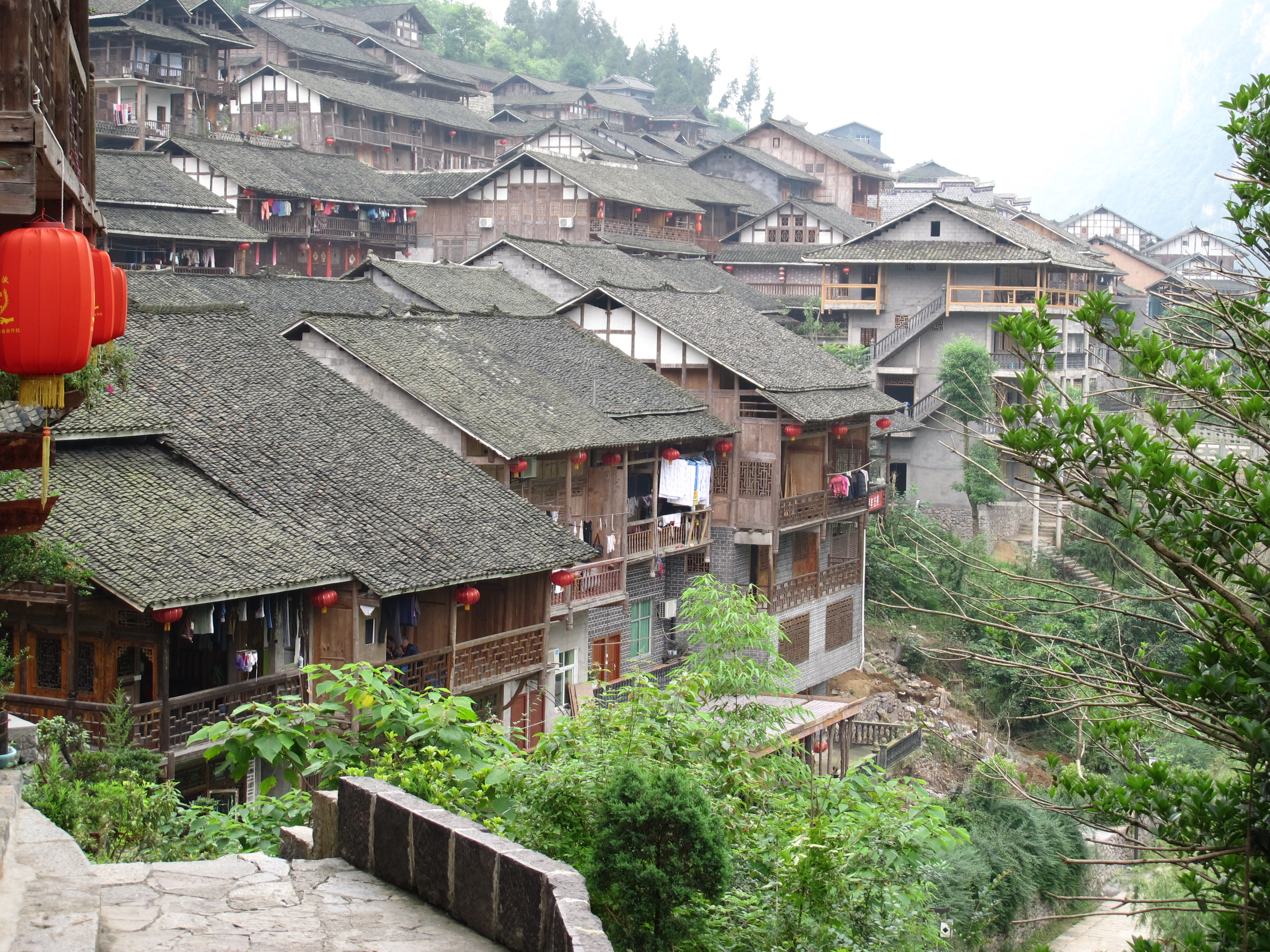
- Gongtan Ancient Town

- Location of Youyang County in Chongqing
- Coordinates: 28.8886°N 108.764°E
- Country: China
- Municipality: Chongqing
- County seat: Taohuayuan Subdistrict

Area
  - Total: 5,173 km^{2} (1,997 sq mi)

Population (2020 census)
  - Total: 607,338
  - Density: 117.4/km^{2} (304.1/sq mi)
- Time zone: UTC+8 (China Standard)
- Website: youyang.gov.cn

Youyang Tujia and Miao Autonomous County, or Youyang County for short (simplified Chinese: 酉阳土家族苗族自治县; traditional Chinese: 酉陽土家族苗族自治縣; pinyin: YǒuYáng Tǔjiāzú Miáozú Zìzhìxiàn) is located in southeastern Chongqing Municipality, southwest China, bordering the provinces of Hunan to the east and Guizhou to the southwest.

The county spans an area of 5,173 km^{2} (1,997 sq mi), and has a population of approximately 854,400 people as of 2018.

== History ==
Youyang was known as Youzhou in ancient times.

== Geography ==
Youyang Tujia Miao Autonomous County is located east of Wu River and west of Youshui River. It is the largest county-level division of Chongqing, having an area of 5,173 km^{2} (1,997 sq mi).

The county contains about 1.5939 million mu (1,062.6 km^{2} or 410.3 sq mi) of arable land, 4.46 million mu (2,973.3 km^{2} or 1,148.0 sq mi) of forested land, and 2.92 million mu (1,946.6 km^{2} or 751.6 sq mi) of grassland.

The Wuling Mountains run through the county, and the county's highest point reaches 1,895 metres (6,217 ft) above sea level.

=== Climate ===
Climate data for Youyang Tujia and Miao Autonomous County, elevation 827 m (2,713 ft), (1991–2020 normals, extremes 1951–present)
Month	Jan	Feb	Mar	Apr	May	Jun	Jul	Aug	Sep	Oct	Nov	Dec	Year
Record high °C (°F)	21.4 (70.5)	27.9 (82.2)	31.3 (88.3)	33.4 (92.1)	35.3 (95.5)	38.1 (100.6)	37.1 (98.8)	37.5 (99.5)	36.0 (96.8)	32.7 (90.9)	27.4 (81.3)	22.0 (71.6)	38.1 (100.6)
Mean daily maximum °C (°F)	7.5 (45.5)	10.1 (50.2)	14.2 (57.6)	20.2 (68.4)	24.4 (75.9)	27.3 (81.1)	30.2 (86.4)	30.2 (86.4)	26.4 (79.5)	20.3 (68.5)	15.9 (60.6)	10.1 (50.2)	19.7 (67.5)
Daily mean °C (°F)	4.1 (39.4)	6.3 (43.3)	9.8 (49.6)	15.2 (59.4)	19.5 (67.1)	22.7 (72.9)	25.3 (77.5)	24.9 (76.8)	21.3 (70.3)	15.9 (60.6)	11.3 (52.3)	6.3 (43.3)	15.2 (59.4)
Mean daily minimum °C (°F)	1.6 (34.9)	3.7 (38.7)	6.8 (44.2)	11.8 (53.2)	15.9 (60.6)	19.4 (66.9)	21.8 (71.2)	21.3 (70.3)	17.9 (64.2)	13.1 (55.6)	8.3 (46.9)	3.7 (38.7)	12.1 (53.8)
Record low °C (°F)	−8.4 (16.9)	−5.9 (21.4)	−4.5 (23.9)	−2.5 (27.5)	5.9 (42.6)	11.5 (52.7)	14.6 (58.3)	14.3 (57.7)	9.5 (49.1)	3.2 (37.8)	−3.0 (26.6)	−5.6 (21.9)	−8.4 (16.9)
Average precipitation mm (inches)	30.9 (1.22)	38.3 (1.51)	57.1 (2.25)	114.8 (4.52)	201.8 (7.94)	232.4 (9.15)	199.7 (7.86)	153.8 (6.06)	87.1 (3.43)	116.9 (4.60)	61.5 (2.42)	22.3 (0.88)	1,316.6 (51.84)
Average precipitation days	11.8	11.7	15.0	15.7	17.3	16.9	15.7	14.2	10.6	15.3	10.5	10.4	165.1
Average snowy days	8.5	4.4	2	0	0	0	0	0	0	0	0.4	3.9	19.2
Average relative humidity (%)	76	77	78	79	80	82	81	79	79	81	78	76	79
Mean monthly sunshine hours	41.6	39.1	63.6	82.4	102.7	91.6	147.2	158.3	115.9	73.9	75.4	53.5	1,045.2
Percentage possible sunshine	13	12	17	21	24	22	35	39	32	21	24	17	23
Source: China Meteorological Administrationextremes

== Administrative divisions ==
Youyang Tujia and Miao Autonomous County is divided into 2 subdistricts, 19 towns, and 18 townships. These are then divided into 8 residential communities, and 270 administrative villages.

2 subdistricts

- Taohuayuan Subdistrict (桃花源街道)
- Zhongduo Subdistrict (钟多街道)

19 towns

- Longtan (龙潭镇)
- Mawang (麻旺镇)
- Youchou (酉酬镇)
- Daxi (大溪镇)
- Xinglong (兴隆镇)
- Heishui (黑水镇)
- Ningshi (丁市镇)
- Gongtan (龚滩镇)
- Lixi (李溪镇)
- Ganxi (泔溪镇)
- Youshuihe (酉水河镇)
- Cangling (苍岭镇)
- Xiaohe (小河镇)
- Banxi (板溪镇)
- Tushi (涂市镇)
- Tonggu (铜鼓镇)
- Wufu (五福镇)
- Wanmu (万木镇)
- Nanyaojie (南腰界镇)

18 townships

- Keda Township (可大乡)
- Pianbai Township (偏柏乡)
- Muye Township (木叶乡)
- Maoba Township (毛坝乡)
- Huatian Township (花田乡)
- Houping Township (后坪乡)
- Tianguan Township (天馆乡)
- Yiju Township (宜居乡)
- Liangzeng Township (两罾乡)
- Banqiao Township (板桥乡)
- Guanqing Township (官清乡)
- Chetian Township (车田乡)
- Yudi Township (腴地乡)
- Qingquan Township (清泉乡)
- Miaoxi Township (庙溪乡)
- Langping Township (浪坪乡)
- Shuangquan Township (双泉乡)
- Nanmu Township (楠木乡)

== Demographics ==
As of 2018, the county has a population of approximately 854,400 people. Of this, 275,000 live in urban areas, and 579,400 live in rural areas.

=== Vital statistics ===
In 2018, the county registered a birth rate of 10.89 per thousand, a death rate of 5.74 per thousand, giving it a rate of natural increase of 5.15 per thousand.

=== Ethnic groups ===
Youyang Tujia and Miao Autonomous County is home to 16 ethnic minorities, including the Tujia and Miao people, for which the county is named.

Youyang Tujia and Miao Autonomous County Ethnic Groups (2018)
Group	Population (total)	Population (percent)
Tujia	689,700	80.72%
Miao	97,100	11.36%
Han	67,200	7.87%
Other	400	0.05%
Total	854,400	100.00%

== Culture ==
The county is nicknamed the "Cradle of Tujia people" for its rich Tujia culture.

It is the home of the Baishou Dance, a symbolic tradition of Tujia people. It is a traditional dance which involves waving hands to convey stories of human origins, myths and legends, ethnic migration, ancient wars, hunting and fishing, forestry, labor, food, and other aspects of social life. The dance was added to the second batch of the China National Intangible Cultural Heritage List on June 7, 2008.

The county is also home to a number of traditional folk songs, which perhaps date back to the Southern Song dynasty. The folk songs are popular at festivals, weddings, funerals, and other activities.

== Economy ==
The county has a labor force 40-50% cheaper than that of coastal areas. It is one of the counties with the most water resources in China, and has more than 20 kinds of mineral resources. Youyang is also a "Sanmu" (Chinese: 三木) production base, as it grows three major plants used in Chinese medicine: Eucommia ulmoides (Chinese: 杜仲), Magnolia officinalis (Chinese: 厚朴), and Phellodendron amurense (Chinese: 黄柏). The country as a whole grows about 1,200 kinds of Chinese herbal medicine materials, and is home to large amounts of Artemisia annua.

== Tourism ==
=== Taohuayuan ===
Taohuayuan (Chinese: 桃花源) is a 5A Tourist Attraction, the highest rank of designated attractions in China. Located in the northern corner of the county, Taohuayuan is a place at first described in The Peach Blossom Spring written by Tao Yuanming, a famous writer of the Eastern Jin dynasty (317–420). It is notable that there are more than one Taohuayuan spots in China, and the one in Youyang is a nationwide recognised Taohuayuan.

=== Gongtan Ancient Town ===
Gongtan Ancient Town (Chinese: 龚滩古镇) is located at the intersection of Wu River and Apeng River, and it is a 4A Tourist Attraction. It has a history of more than 1,700 years. More than 200 courtyards and stilted buildings from the Ming Dynasty and Qing Dynasty are preserved in Gongtan.

=== Wu River Gallery ===
Wu River Gallery is the 60 km (37 mi) long, naturally formed river bank of Wu River in Chongqing Youyang, and it is a 4A Tourist Attraction. It is famous for the strangely shaped mountains along the gallery.

=== Longtan Ancient Town ===
Longtan Ancient Town (Chinese: 龙潭古镇) is an ancient town with ancient wood architecture.

== Notable people ==
- Zhao Shiyan, communist revolutionary
