= Chinese dance (disambiguation) =

Dance in China is a highly varied art form, consisting of many modern and traditional dance genres.

Chinese dance may also refer to specific dances:

- Lion dance
- Dragon dance
- Dunhuang dance
- Errenzhuan
- Yangge
- Baishou Dance
- Nuo opera, including Nuo dance
- Chinese fitness dancing

== See also ==
- Sword dance
