= Yudi Township =

Yudi Township 腴地乡
- Township
- Location in Chongqing
- Coordinates: 29°0′39″N 108°55′18″E
- Country: People's Republic of China
- Direct-administered municipality: Chongqing
- Autonomous county: Youyang Tujia and Miao Autonomous County
- Time zone: UTC+8 (China Standard)

Yudi Township (simplified Chinese: 腴地乡; traditional Chinese: 腴地鄉; pinyin: Yúdì Xiāng) is a township under the administration of Youyang Tujia and Miao Autonomous County, Chongqing, China. As of 2020, it has four villages under its administration: Shangyu (上腴), Xiayu (下腴), Gaozhuang (高庄), and Fengjia (丰家).

== See also ==
- List of township-level divisions of Chongqing
