= Songzi =

Songzi 松滋市 Sungtze
- County-level city
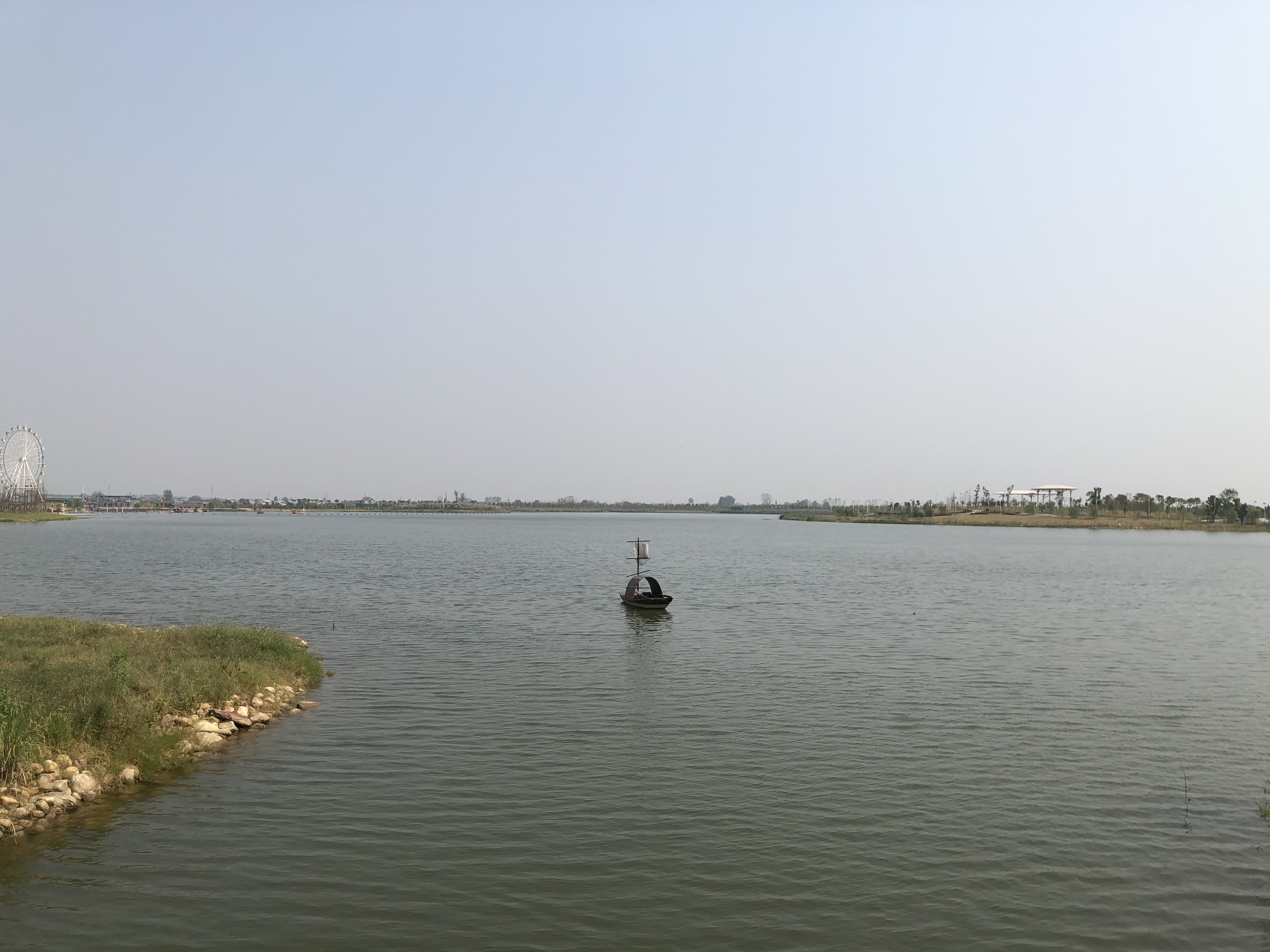
- Daoguxi Urban Wetland Park

- Location in Hubei
- Coordinates (Songzi government): 30°10′26″N 111°45′25″E
- Country: People's Republic of China
- Province: Hubei
- Prefecture-level city: Jingzhou

Area
  - County-level city: 2,176.9 km^{2} (840.5 sq mi)
  - Urban: 96.00 km^{2} (37.07 sq mi)

Population (2020 census)
  - County-level city: 654,762
  - Density: 300.78/km^{2} (779.01/sq mi)
  - Urban: 306,049
- Time zone: UTC+8 (China Standard)
- Website: www.hbsz.gov.cn

Songzi (Chinese: 松滋市; pinyin: Sōngzī Shì) is a city in the southwest of Hubei province, People's Republic of China, located in the middle reach and southern bank of the Yangtze River. It is a county-level city under the administration of the prefecture-level city of Jingzhou. It controls 16 townships and 2 development zones, 235,000 households and a population of 765,911 (data from the 2010 census). It is a long-historied but young and robust city.

== Administrative divisions ==
Fourteen towns:

- Xinjiangkou (新江口镇), Nanhai (南海镇), Babao (八宝镇), Yuanshi (涴市镇), Laocheng (老城镇), Chendian (陈店镇), Wangjiaqiao (王家桥镇), Sijiachang (斯家场镇), Yanglinshi (杨林市镇), Zhichanghe (纸厂河镇), Jieheshi (街河市镇), Weishui (洈水镇), Liujiachang (刘家场镇), Shadaoguan (沙道观镇)

Two townships:

- Wanjia Township (万家乡), Xiejiaping Tujia Ethnic Township (卸甲坪土家族乡)

== Geography ==
Songzi is located at the intersection of the Jiaoliu Railway and the Yangtze River. Its terrain consists primarily of hills and plains, which account for 59.5% and 37.7% of its total area, respectively.

Latitude	30.1758	Longitude	111.7802	Altitude(feet)	157
Lat (DMS)	30° 10' 33N	Long (DMS)	111° 46' 49E	Altitude(meters)	47
Time zone	UTC+8				

Songzi is located at the intersection of the Jiaoliu Railway and the Yangtze River. Longitude 110º14′—112º03′ east, latitude 29º53′—30º22′ north, 77 kilometres (48 mi) lengthwise from east to west, 55 km widthwise from north to south, the total land area is 2,235 square kilometres (863 sq mi), with an arable land of 61,533 hectares (152,050 acres). It extends 77 km from east to west and 55 km from north to south. The city is situated along the southern bank of the Jing River, in the middle reaches of the Yangtze River. It covers a land area of 2,235 km² and comprises 14 towns and two townships. As of the beginning of 2022 it had a population of approximately 640,000.

Its terrain consists primarily of hills and plains, which account for 59.5% and 37.7% of its total area, respectively. It also has 16 towns and townships. The land cover (LC) types in Wangjiaqiao, Liujiachang, Yanglin, and Jiaoshui towns, located in hilly and mountainous areas, are diverse. The land cover types in Yanglin and Wangjiaqiao are characterized by numerous patches and complex boundaries, whereas those in Jiaoshui and Liujiachang are more varied but relatively evenly distributed. In the plains, Babao and Shadaoguan towns have relatively few land cover types, several relatively homogeneous boundary shapes, and large land cover areas (LCAs).

Songzi is conjoining with Jianghan Plain (江汉平原) in the east {neighbouring with Jingzhou, Gong'an, adjoining with Yichang in the west {connecting to Wufeng and Yidu, bordering with Wuling in the south (adjacent to Li County, Shimen in Hunan province), and being bounded by Yangtze River in the north, looking across the river to Zhicheng. It is situated in the crossing point between Jiaoliu Railway and Yangtze River.

== Climate ==
Climate data for Songzi, elevation 107 m (351 ft), (1991–2020 normals, extremes 1981–2010)
Month	Jan	Feb	Mar	Apr	May	Jun	Jul	Aug	Sep	Oct	Nov	Dec	Year
Record high °C (°F)	20.9 (69.6)	28.4 (83.1)	34.2 (93.6)	35.2 (95.4)	36.8 (98.2)	37.7 (99.9)	39.7 (103.5)	39.5 (103.1)	38.0 (100.4)	34.2 (93.6)	30.2 (86.4)	22.8 (73.0)	39.7 (103.5)
Mean daily maximum °C (°F)	8.2 (46.8)	11.2 (52.2)	16.0 (60.8)	22.3 (72.1)	27.0 (80.6)	30.0 (86.0)	32.5 (90.5)	32.1 (89.8)	28.1 (82.6)	22.8 (73.0)	16.6 (61.9)	10.7 (51.3)	21.5 (70.6)
Daily mean °C (°F)	5.0 (41.0)	7.5 (45.5)	11.8 (53.2)	17.8 (64.0)	22.5 (72.5)	26.0 (78.8)	28.5 (83.3)	28.1 (82.6)	24.0 (75.2)	18.7 (65.7)	12.8 (55.0)	7.3 (45.1)	17.5 (63.5)
Mean daily minimum °C (°F)	2.5 (36.5)	4.7 (40.5)	8.6 (47.5)	14.2 (57.6)	19.0 (66.2)	22.8 (73.0)	25.3 (77.5)	25.0 (77.0)	20.9 (69.6)	15.7 (60.3)	10.0 (50.0)	4.6 (40.3)	14.4 (58.0)
Record low °C (°F)	−5.4 (22.3)	−4.1 (24.6)	−1.2 (29.8)	1.7 (35.1)	10.3 (50.5)	15.0 (59.0)	18.7 (65.7)	16.4 (61.5)	11.3 (52.3)	3.8 (38.8)	−0.7 (30.7)	−6.2 (20.8)	−6.2 (20.8)
Average precipitation mm (inches)	38.2 (1.50)	51.1 (2.01)	72.4 (2.85)	126.2 (4.97)	147.9 (5.82)	179.8 (7.08)	196.8 (7.75)	123.2 (4.85)	86.3 (3.40)	77.9 (3.07)	59.7 (2.35)	24.7 (0.97)	1,184.2 (46.62)
Average precipitation days (≥ 0.1 mm)	8.9	9.9	12.5	12.6	13.4	12.6	11.6	9.4	9.1	10.0	9.7	7.6	127.3
Average snowy days	4.1	2.9	1.0	0	0	0	0	0	0	0	0.3	1.5	9.8
Average relative humidity (%)	73	72	73	73	72	77	78	76	73	71	73	71	74
Mean monthly sunshine hours	80.1	82.2	112.3	140.2	151.4	145.7	195.4	203.6	146.2	125.1	107.4	94.6	1,584.2
Percentage possible sunshine	25	26	30	36	36	35	46	50	40	36	34	30	35
Source: China Meteorological Administration

== Economy ==
Songzi's economy is primarily based on agriculture, with the fertile land along the Yangtze River supporting the cultivation of rice, tea, and other crops. The industrial and tourism sectors have also contributed to local economic development in recent years. In 2024, preliminary estimates indicated that Songzi's gross domestic product (GDP) reached 55.73 billion yuan, representing a 7.8% increase over the previous year at comparable prices. The added value of the primary industry was 6.645 billion yuan, an increase of 2.8%; that of the secondary industry was 23.708 billion yuan, an increase of 13.2%; and that of the tertiary industry was 25.377 billion yuan, an increase of 4.1%. The industrial structure was 11.9:42.6:45.5. Energy consumption per 10,000 yuan of GDP decreased by 3.79% compared with the previous year. During the year, 8,275 new urban jobs were created, and 1,570 laid-off and unemployed workers were re-employed.

== Agriculture ==
In 2025 the added value of agriculture reached 7.189 billion yuan during the year, representing a 3.4% increase at comparable prices. The total output value of agriculture, forestry, animal husbandry, and fishery reached 12.018 billion yuan, an increase of 3.5% at comparable prices. The output values of agriculture, forestry, animal husbandry, and fishery were 5.173 billion yuan, 211 million yuan, 4.128 billion yuan, and 1.358 billion yuan, respectively. Their respective shares of the total output value were 43.0%, 1.8%, 34.4%, and 11.3%.

The total sown area of grain crops during the year was 1.3349 million mu, an increase of 0.6% compared with the previous year, while total grain production reached 517,800 tonnes, an increase of 0.1%. The sown area of summer-harvested grain crops was 386,000 mu, an increase of 1.1%, with a total output of 80,700 tonnes, an increase of 0.4%. The sown area of rice was 626,200 mu, an increase of 0.2%, with a total output of 351,200 tonnes, an increase of 0.3%. The sown area of oil crops was 414,100 mu, an increase of 13.4%, with a total output of 65,300 tonnes, an increase of 13.5%. The sown area of cotton was 40,000 mu, a decrease of 14.3%, with a total output of 2,800 tonnes, a decrease of 12.5%. All percentage changes are compared with the previous year.

Rural e-commerce has also contributed to agricultural development in Songzi. The county is home to numerous so-called "Taobao villages", where a large portion of the rural population is engaged in e-commerce. In 2019, Xinjiangkou Town was included in China's Taobao Town list, published by Alibaba's AliResearch Institute, reflecting the development of e-commerce in the city's rural areas.Agricultural products sold through online platforms included peaches, pomelos, bean products and kudzu powder.

== Tourism ==
Songzi's tourism is also richly endowed by nature. There is the state-level scenic spot – Weishui Resort (洈水风景区), which integrates the mountains, waters, caves, forests, springs into one natural wonder. It provides the multi-functions for tourism, adventure, scientific exploration, summer resort, and sanatorium. It is located within the Golden Triangle for Tourism among the Three Gorges of the Yangtze River, Jingzhou Ancient City (荆州古城), and Zhangjiajie Scenic Area.

Weishui Resort consists of three parts: Weishui Reservoir (洈水湖), Weishui National Forest Park (洈水国家森林公园), and the Cluster of Karst Caves and Hot Springs (溶洞温泉群). The resort combines the mountainous and aquatic landscapes characteristic of southern China with the grandeur of the scenery of northern China.

Weishui Lake is called the "Fairyland in the Southern Chu". Weishui Waterdam has a total length of 8969m and is said to be the longest earth-filled man-made dam in Asia. On the clear blue water are islets covered by green trees and bushes. Surrounding the lake are dark green hills stretching far into the distance and disappearing into the Wuling Mountains. "Mountains go alive with water, water becomes enchanting with mountains (山得水而活，水得山而媚)".

Weishui Lake is home to the famous Scaly-sided merganser which is categorized as Endangered by the IUCN Red List. The mergansers spend their winter in the reservoir through late November to early March.

Besides Weishui Lake there is a Buddhist Temple famous in Southern Chu ("楚南名刹") – Lingjiu Si (灵鹫寺), whose history can be dated back to Jin dynasty (晋朝).

After travelling approximately 20 kilometres northwest by boat across Weishui Lake, visitors can climb a nearby mountain, where ancient caves are located.

The cave's formation began during the Cambrian system about 500 million years ago, with its "one superb, three wonders, ten focal points" and close to one hundred geological scenic spots. In view of the complex geological structures, the continuous geological strata, and the clear topographic features, the area where the Cave locates have been described as "the teaching and practicing base for Science of the Earth" by Changjiang University (长江大学).

An underground stream flows through the cave, forming a 10-meter-high waterfall near the entrance. The interior features diverse speleothems, including stalactites, stalagmites, columns, helictites, and flowstone draperies. The cave system contains a series of rimstone dams formed by the underground river over millions of years; this includes a three-staged dam with a top stage reaching 4 meters in height, making it notably higher than comparable formations in China. A large chamber features a 16-by-7-meter flowstone drapery consisting of 262 individual pleats.

Weishui National Forest Park occupies an area of 52.8 square kilometres (20.4 sq mi), with the 96% forestation rate. There are rich living things resources – more than 1,000 different kinds of plants and more than 20 kinds of wild beast animals and close to 40 kinds of birds and numerous amphibious animals, reptiles, insects and fishes. Even there were reports of sighting Southern China Tiger, Leopard (panthera pardus), White Swans and other rare animals in the forest.

== History ==
In ancient time, Songzi was under the administration of Jingzhou, which belonged to the state of Chu in the Warring States period and Nanjun (南郡) in the Qin dynasty.

In Gaozu Year 5 (BC 202) of the Han dynasty, a county administration was established here, named Gaocheng (高成).

In Jianwu Year 6 (AD 30) of the Eastern Han dynasty, Gaocheng county was dissolved and merged into Chanling (孱陵) (modern day Gong'an County).

During the Three Kingdoms period, the area belonged to the state of Wu (吳) and was under the administration of Chanling (孱陵), with a Lexiang Magistrate (樂鄉督治) appointed to govern the area.

In the third year of the Xiankang era (337 AD) of the Eastern Jin dynasty, refugees who had emigrated from Songzi in Lujiangjun (廬江郡) (modern-day Huoqiu County, Anhui) to flee from the disorder by the wars, settled down and established here the Songzi county.

The county's name has remained in use since then, spanning more than 1,600 years.

In December 1995, the county was upgraded to county-level city status. Xinjiangkou (新江口) has served as the city seat since September 1945.

== Infrastructures ==
Songzi has the convenient transportation system with complete and good infrastructures. The whole city is crisscrossed with a network of high-grade roads. It is just 90 kilometres (56 mi) away from Three-Gorge International Airport and 50 kilometres (31 mi) away from Shashi Airport. Jiao-Liu Railway runs across the city, with two level-3 railway stations. Along the main passage of Changjiang River, there are 3 thousand-ton berths, 1 mechanized dock.

There is the ample electricity supply. It has one coal power plant, 4 hydro-power stations and also the transformation substations with the power supply from Three-Gorge Hydro-Power Stations.

== Demographics ==
The following nationalities are represented: Han, Hui, Manchu, Tujia, Miao, Mongols.
