= Ron Monroe =

Chinese actress based in Japan

- ロンモンロウ
- Born: Long Mengrou (龙梦柔); July 31, 1995 (age 31); Guzhang County, Hunan, China
- Other name: Ron Monrou
- Occupations: Actress, singer
- Years active: 2015–present
- Agent: Avex Entertainment
- Website: ron-monroe.com

Long Mengrou (Chinese: 龙梦柔; pinyin: Long Mèngróu), also known by her Japanese name Ron Monroe (ロンモンロウ, Ron Monrou) (born 31 July 1995), is a Chinese actress and singer based in Japan.

== Early life ==
Ron was born on 31 July 1995 in Guzhang County in Xiangxi Tujia and Miao Autonomous Prefecture, Hunan, China, to an ordinary peasant family. She is of Tujia ethnicity, one of the 55 ethnic minorities in China. At young age, she helped her father in the fields and then homeschooled her younger brother. She attended Guzhang Middle School for junior high school and Baojing County National Middle School for high school. After graduating from high school in 2013, she was admitted to the undergraduate class of accounting at Shanghai Ocean University.

== Career ==
In March 2015, Ron won the first place in the CCTV-6 reality show Come On! Cinderella, which was held in Los Angeles, United States. In 2016, she joined the talent show Super Girl on Mango TV. In 2018, just before graduating from university, she officially began her entertainment career in Japan. That March, she made her first live TV appearance on variety show Hanazaka Times and later appeared on lifestyle information program Nanairo Biyori on TV Tokyo.

In April 2018, she appeared in a local TV commercial in Hokkaido and in May, made her acting debut in episode 7 of the drama Love Rerun. This was her first acting role, as she had no prior acting experience in China. On 20 June 2018, Ron made her Japanese music debut with the digital single PLANET under Avex Entertainment, which topped the J-Pop rankings on China's major music video platform YinYueTai. She also appeared on the covers of Weekly Young Jump and Weekly Playboy, marking her magazine debut in Japan. After graduating from university in June 2018, she moved to Japan and has since based her career there.

In 2019, Ron expanded her career by becoming a regular on NHK’s language program Learning Chinese by Watching TV and contributing voice work for the anime film One Piece: Stampede. Despite reduced work and limited travel between China and Japan during the COVID-19 pandemic, she remained in Japan and steadily continued her career. In 2021, she appeared in the anthology film DIVOC-12. In 2022, she portrayed Princess Mei Chang in the live-action film trilogy adaptation Fullmetal Alchemist: Final Chapter.

== Personal life ==
Her handle name "Kuriko" comes from her being a fan of Japanese actor Shun Oguri. She also gained attention due to her resemblance to Japanese actress Yui Aragaki. In regard to her career, Ron stated that she wants to "become a bridge between China and Japan, and do work to show the current landscape in China, as well as help as many people in China as I can to learn about Japan today."

== Filmography ==
=== Films ===
- One Piece: Stampede (2019) - Marron (voice)
- DIVOC-12 "Nameless One Piece: Anna" (2021) - Anna
- Fullmetal Alchemist: The Revenge of Scar (2022) - Mei Chang
- Fullmetal Alchemist: The Final Alchemy(2022) - Mei Chang

=== Television ===
- Come On! Cinderella (CCTV-6, 2015
- Super Girl (Mango TV, 2016)
- Love Rerun (Nippon TV, 2018) - Kuriko
- Double Bed (TBS, 2019)
- Learning Chinese by Watching TV (NHK, 2019)
- Tamori Club (TV Asahi, 2020)
- Terrace House (2020)
- Tensai TV kun (2020–2023)
- Share La! Instant Ramen Arrangement Club Started (TBS, 2022) - Mei Lin
- Sugisaki Hana's Filming Break (Wowow, 2023) - Lily

=== Web ===
- Hoshikuzu Revengers (Abema TV, 2018)
- Baraste (Abema TV, 2018)

=== Commercials ===
- Tokyu Stay (2018)
- Oyatsu Company (2018)
- Otsuka Furniture (2019)

== Discography ==
- PLANET (20 June 2018) (Note: Japanese and Chinese cover of Japanese music duo Lambsey)
- TOKYO Walking tour (TOKYO漫步) (21 November 2018) (Note: Chinese cover of Ai Otsuka's Love Honey)
- Toki no Nagare ni Mi o Makase (10 December 2018) (Note: Chinese and Japanese cover of Teresa Teng's song)
