= Autonomous county =

Autonomous administrative division of China

Autonomous counties (Chinese: 自治县) and autonomous banners (Chinese: 自治旗) are county-level autonomous administrative divisions of China. Autonomous counties tend to have a large number of ethnic minority citizens compared to ordinary counties (if not an outright majority), or are the historic home of a significant minority population.

There are 117 autonomous counties and three autonomous banners. The latter are found in Inner Mongolia Autonomous Region and the former are found everywhere else.

== Maps ==
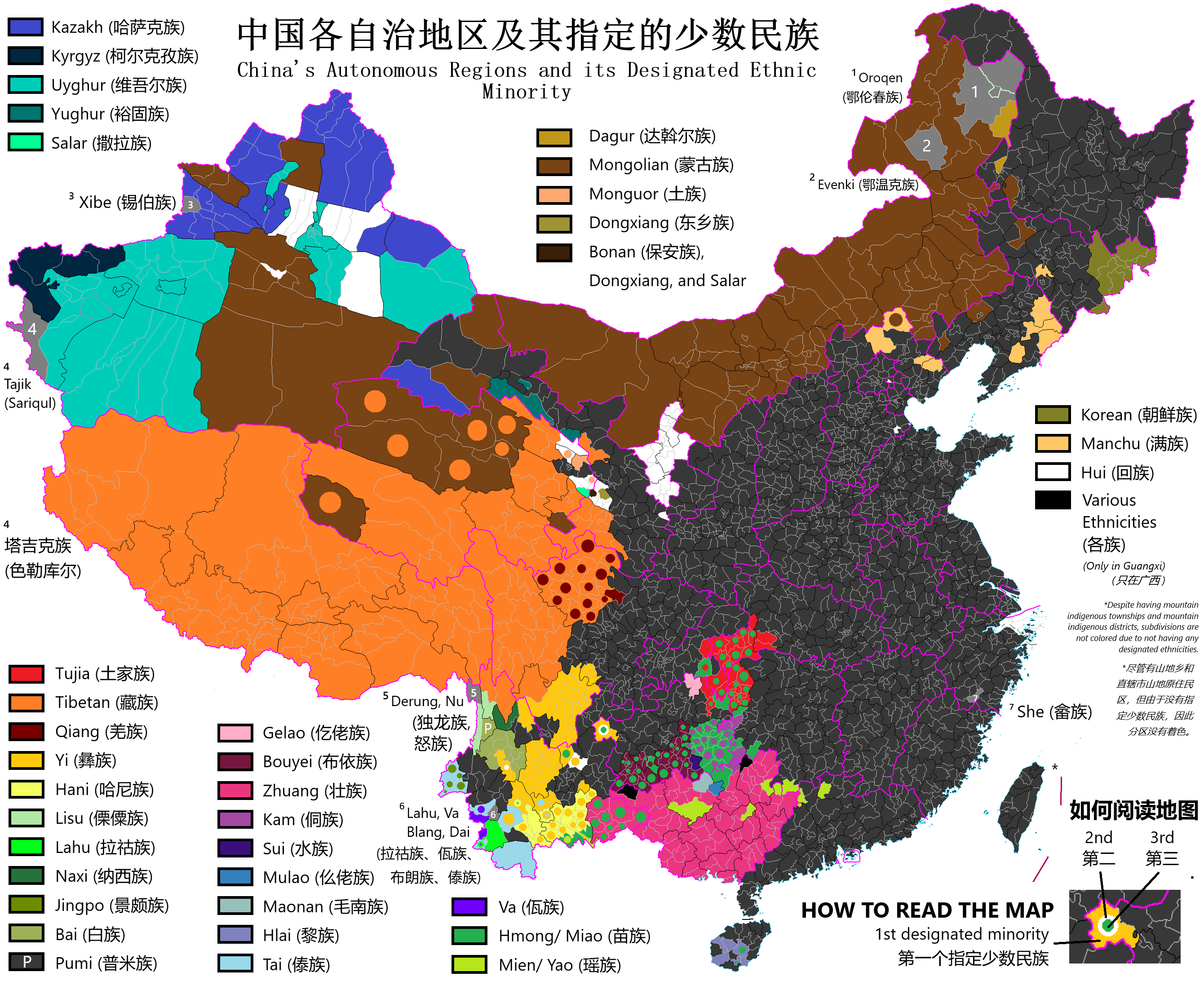
China's Autonomous Regions and their Designated Ethnic Minority

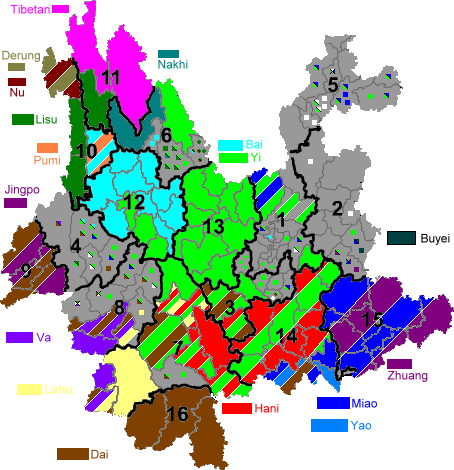
Major autonomous areas within Yunnan (excluding Hui)

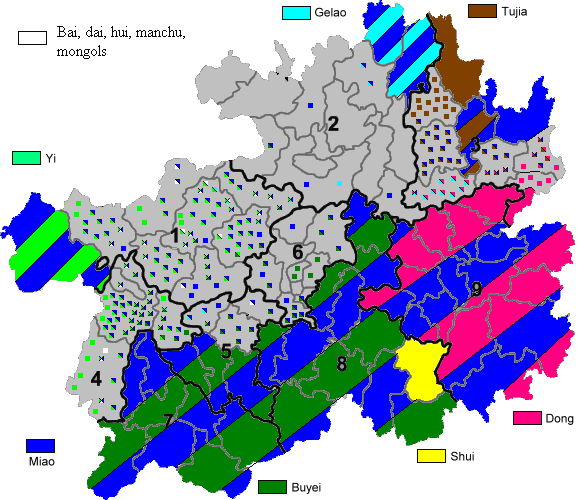
Major autonomous areas within Guizhou (excluding Hui)

== List ==
Province-level entry	Name	Chinese	Pinyin	Designated minority	Language of designated minority
Chongqing	Pengshui Miao and Tujia Autonomous County	彭水苗族土家族自治县	Péngshuǐ Miáozú Tǔjiāzú Zìzhìxiàn	Miao and Tujia	?
Chongqing	Shizhu Tujia Autonomous County	石柱土家族自治县	Shízhù Tǔjiāzú Zìzhìxiàn	Tujia	?
Chongqing	Xiushan Tujia and Miao Autonomous County	秀山土家族苗族自治县	Xiùshān Tǔjiāzú Miáozú Zìzhìxiàn	Tujia and Miao	?
Chongqing	Youyang Tujia and Miao Autonomous County	酉阳土家族苗族自治县	Yǒuyáng Tǔjiāzú Miáozú Zìzhìxiàn	Tujia and Miao	?
Gansu	Aksay Kazakh Autonomous County	阿克塞哈萨克族自治县	Ākèsài Hāsàkèzú Zìzhìxiàn	Kazakh	Kazakh: اقساي قازاق اۆتونوميالىق اۋدانى; Aqsay Qazaq avtonomyalıq awdanı
Gansu	Dongxiang Autonomous County	东乡族自治县	Dōngxiāngzú Zìzhìxiàn	Dongxiang	Santa: Dunxianzu Zizhixien
Gansu	Jishishan Bonan, Dongxiang and Salar Autonomous County	积石山保安族东乡族撒拉族自治县	Jīshíshān Bǎo'ānzú Dōngxiāngzú Sǎlāzú Zìzhìxiàn	Bonan, Dongxiang and Salar	?
Gansu	Subei Mongol Autonomous County	肃北蒙古族自治县	Sùběi Měnggǔzú Zìzhìxiàn	Mongol	Mongol: ᠰᠤᠪᠧᠢ ᠶᠢᠨ ᠮᠣᠩᠭᠣᠯ ᠥᠪᠡᠷᠲᠡᠭᠡᠨ ᠵᠠᠰᠠᠬᠤ ᠰᠢᠶᠠᠨ; Subėi-yin Moŋɣol öbertegen jasaqu siyan
Gansu	Sunan Yugur Autonomous County	肃南裕固族自治县	Sùnán Yùgùzú Zìzhìxiàn	Yugur	?
Gansu	Bairi Tibetan Autonomous County	天祝藏族自治县	Tiānzhù Zàngzú Zìzhìxiàn	Tibetan	Tibetan: དཔའ་རིས་བོད་རིགས་རང་སྐྱོང་རྫོང༌། dpa'a-ris bod-rigs rang-skyong rdzong
Gansu	Zhangjiachuan Hui Autonomous County	张家川回族自治县	Zhāngjiāchuān Huízú Zìzhìxiàn	Hui	(The Hui speak Chinese); Xiao'erjing: جْاکِاچُوًا خُوِذُو ذِجِشِیًا
Guangdong	Liannan Yao Autonomous County	连南瑶族自治县	Liánnán Yáozú Zìzhìxiàn	Yao	?
Guangdong	Lianshan Zhuang and Yao Autonomous County	连山壮族瑶族自治县	Liánshān Zhuàngzú Yáozú Zìzhìxiàn	Zhuang and Yao	Zhuang: Lenzsanh Bouxcuengh Yauzcuz Swciyen
Guangdong	Ruyuan Yao Autonomous County	乳源瑶族自治县	Rǔyuán Yáozú Zìzhìxiàn	Yao	?
Guangxi	Bama Yao Autonomous County	巴马瑶族自治县	Bāmǎ Yáozú Zìzhìxiàn	Yao	?
Guangxi	Dahua Yao Autonomous County	大化瑶族自治县	Dàhuà Yáozú Zìzhìxiàn	Yao	?
Guangxi	Du'an Yao Autonomous County	都安瑶族自治县	Dū'ān Yáozú Zìzhìxiàn	Yao	?
Guangxi	Fuchuan Yao Autonomous County	富川瑶族自治县	Fùchuān Yáozú Zìzhìxiàn	Yao	?
Guangxi	Gongcheng Yao Autonomous County	恭城瑶族自治县	Gōngchéng Yáozú Zìzhìxiàn	Yao	?
Guangxi	Huanjiang Maonan Autonomous County	环江毛南族自治县	Huánjiāng Máonánzú Zìzhìxiàn	Maonan	?
Guangxi	Jinxiu Yao Autonomous County	金秀瑶族自治县	Jīnxiù Yáozú Zìzhìxiàn	Yao	?
Guangxi	Longlin Pan-Ethnicities Autonomous County	隆林各族自治县	Lōnglín Gèzú Zìzhìxiàn	Various ethnicities	?
Guangxi	Longsheng Pan-Ethnicities Autonomous County	龙胜各族自治县	Lóngshēng Gèzú Zìzhìxiàn	Various ethnicities	?
Guangxi	Luocheng Mulao Autonomous County	罗城仫佬族自治县	Luóchéng Mùlǎozú Zìzhìxiàn	Mulao	?
Guangxi	Rongshui Miao Autonomous County	融水苗族自治县	Róngshuǐ Miáozú Zìzhìxiàn	Miao	?
Guangxi	Sanjiang Dong Autonomous County	三江侗族自治县	Sānjiāng Dòngzú Zìzhìxiàn	Dong	?
Guizhou	Daozhen Gelao and Miao Autonomous County	道真仡佬族苗族自治县	Dǎozhēn Gēlǎozú Miáozú Zìzhìxiàn	Gelao and Miao	?
Guizhou	Guanling Buyei and Miao Autonomous County	关岭布依族苗族自治县	Guānlíng Bùyīzú Miáozú Zìzhìxiàn	Buyei and Miao	?
Guizhou	Sandu Shui Autonomous County	三都水族自治县	Sāndū Shuǐzú Zìzhìxiàn	Sui	?
Guizhou	Songtao Miao Autonomous County	松桃苗族自治县	Sōngtáo Miáozú Zìzhìxiàn	Miao	?
Guizhou	Weining Yi, Hui, and Miao Autonomous County	威宁彝族回族苗族自治县	Wēiníng Yízú Huízú Miáozú Zìzhìxiàn	Yi, Hui, and Miao	(The Hui speak Chinese); Xiao'erjing: وِنٍْ یِذُو خُوِذُو مِیَوْذُو ذِجِشِیًا; Yi: ꊈꆀꆈꌠꉇꉈꂯꑿꊨꏦꏱꅉꑤ
Guizhou	Wuchuan Gelao and Miao Autonomous County	务川仡佬族苗族自治县	Wùchuān Gēlǎozú Miáozú Zìzhìxiàn	Gelao and Miao	?
Guizhou	Yanhe Tujia Autonomous County	沿河土家族自治县	Yánhé Tǔjiāzú Zìzhìxiàn	Tujia	?
Guizhou	Yinjiang Tujia and Miao Autonomous County	印江土家族苗族自治县	Yìnjiāng Tǔjiāzú Miáozú Zìzhìxiàn	Tujia and Miao	?
Guizhou	Yuping Dong Autonomous County	玉屏侗族自治县	Yùpíng Dòngzú Zìzhìxiàn	Dong	?
Guizhou	Zhenning Buyei and Miao Autonomous County	镇宁布依族苗族自治县	Zhènníng Bùyīzú Miáozú Zìzhìxiàn	Bouyei and Miao	?
Guizhou	Ziyun Miao and Buyei Autonomous County	紫云苗族布依族自治县	Zǐyún Miáozú Bùyīzú Zìzhìxiàn	Miao and Buyei	?
Hainan	Baisha Li Autonomous County	白沙黎族自治县	Báishā Lízú Zìzhìxiàn	Li	?
Hainan	Baoting Li and Miao Autonomous County	保亭黎族苗族自治县	Bǎotíng Lízú Miáozú Zìzhìxiàn	Li and Miao	?
Hainan	Changjiang Li Autonomous County	昌江黎族自治县	Chāngjiāng Lízú Zìzhìxiàn	Li	?
Hainan	Ledong Li Autonomous County	乐东黎族自治县	Lèdōng Lízú Zìzhìxiàn	Li	?
Hainan	Lingshui Li Autonomous County	陵水黎族自治县	Língshuǐ Lízú Zìzhìxiàn	Li	?
Hainan	Qiongzhong Li and Miao Autonomous County	琼中黎族苗族自治县	Qióngzhōng Lízú Miáozú Zìzhìxiàn	Li and Miao	?
Hebei	Dachang Hui Autonomous County	大厂回族自治县	Dàchǎng Huízú Zìzhìxiàn	Hui	(The Hui speak Chinese); Xiao'erjing: دَاچْا خُوِذُو ذِجِشِیًا
Hebei	Fengning Manchu Autonomous County	丰宁满族自治县	Fēngníng Mǎnzú Zìzhìxiàn	Manchu	Manchu: ᡶᡝᠩᠨᡳᠩ ᠮᠠᠨᠵᡠ ᠪᡝᠶᡝ ᡩᠠᠰᠠᠩᡤᠠ ᠰᡳᠶᠠᠨ; Fengning manju beye dasangga siyan
Hebei	Kuancheng Manchu Autonomous County	宽城满族自治县	Kuānchéng Mǎnzú Zìzhìxiàn	Manchu	Manchu: ᡴᡠᠸᠠᠨᠴᡝᠩ ᠮᠠᠨᠵᡠ ᠪᡝᠶᡝ ᡩᠠᠰᠠᠩᡤᠠ ᠰᡳᠶᠠᠨ; Kuwanceng manju beye dasangga siyan
Hebei	Mengcun Hui Autonomous County	孟村回族自治县	Mèngcūn Huízú Zìzhìxiàn	Hui	(The Hui speak Chinese); Xiao'erjing: مْعڞٌ خُوِذُو ذِجِشِیًا
Hebei	Qinglong Manchu Autonomous County	青龙满族自治县	Qīnglóng Mǎnzú Zìzhìxiàn	Manchu	Manchu: ᠴᡳᠩᠯᡠᠩ ᠮᠠᠨᠵᡠ ᠪᡝᠶᡝ ᡩᠠᠰᠠᠩᡤᠠ ᠰᡳᠶᠠᠨ; Cinglung manju beye dasangga siyan
Hebei	Weichang Manchu and Mongol Autonomous County	围场满族蒙古族自治县	Wéichǎng Mǎnzú Měnggǔzú Zìzhìxiàn	Manchu and Mongol	Manchu: ᠸᡝᡳᠴᠠᠩ ᠮᠠᠨᠵᡠ ᠮᠣᠩᡤᠣ ᠪᡝᠶᡝ ᡩᠠᠰᠠᠩᡤᠠ ᠰᡳᠶᠠᠨ; Weičaŋ Manju Moŋgo beye dasaŋga siyan Mongol: ᠸᠧᠢᠴᠠᠩ ᠮᠠᠨᠵᠤ ᠮᠣᠩᠭ᠋ᠣᠯ ᠥᠪᠡᠷᠲᠡᠭᠡᠨ ᠵᠠᠰᠠᠬᠤ ᠰᠢᠶᠠᠨ; Vėičaŋ Manju Moŋɣol öbertegen jasaqu siyan
Heilongjiang	Dorbod Mongol Autonomous County	杜尔伯特蒙古族自治县	Dù'ěrbótè Měnggǔzú Zìzhìxiàn	Mongol	Mongol: ᠳᠥᠷᠪᠡᠳ ᠮᠣᠩᠭᠣᠯ ᠥᠪᠡᠷᠲᠡᠭᠡᠨ ᠵᠠᠰᠠᠬᠤ ᠰᠢᠶᠠᠨ; Dörbed Moŋɣol öbertegen jasaqu siyan
Hubei	Changyang Tujia Autonomous County	长阳土家族自治县	Chángyáng Tǔjiāzú Zìzhìxiàn	Tujia	?
Hubei	Wufeng Tujia Autonomous County	五峰土家族自治县	Wǔfēng Tǔjiāzú Zìzhìxiàn	Tujia	?
Hunan	Chengbu Miao Autonomous County	城步苗族自治县	Chēngbù Miáozú Zìzhìxiàn	Miao	?
Hunan	Jianghua Yao Autonomous County	江华瑶族自治县	Jiānghuá Yáozǔ Zìzhìxiàn	Yao	?
Hunan	Jingzhou Miao and Dong Autonomous County	靖州苗族侗族自治县	Jǐngzhōu Miáozú Dòngzú Zìzhìxiàn	Miao and Dong	?
Hunan	Mayang Miao Autonomous County	麻阳苗族自治县	Máyáng Miáozú Zìzhìxiàn	Miao	?
Hunan	Tongdao Dong Autonomous County	通道侗族自治县	Tōngdào Dòngzú Zìzhìxiàn	Dong	?
Hunan	Xinhuang Dong Autonomous County	新晃侗族自治县	Xīnhuǎng Dòngzú Zìzhìxiàn	Dong	?
Hunan	Zhijiang Dong Autonomous County	芷江侗族自治县	Zhǐjiāng Dòngzú Zìzhìxiàn	Dong	?
Inner Mongolia	Oroqen Autonomous Banner	鄂伦春自治旗	Èlúnchūn Zìzhìqí	Oroqen	?
Inner Mongolia	Evenki Autonomous Banner	鄂温克族自治旗	Èwēnkèzú Zìzhìqí	Evenks	Evenki: ᠧᠸᠧᠩᠺᠢ ᠠᠶᠢᠮᠠᠨᠨᠢ ᠮᠧᠧᠨᠵᠢ ᠵᠣᠬᠠᠷ ᠭᠣᠰ; Ewengki Aimanni Meenji Zhohar Gos
Inner Mongolia	Morin Dawa Daur Autonomous Banner	莫力达瓦达斡尔族自治旗	Mòlìdáwǎ Dáwò'ěrzú Zìzhìqí	Daur	Daur: Morin'dawaa Daor weerie ixkiewu guasei
Jilin	Changbai Korean Autonomous County	长白朝鲜自治县	Chángbái Cháoxiǎnzú Zìzhìxiàn	Korean	Korean: 장백 조선족 자치현; Jangbaek Joseonjok Jachihyeon
Jilin	Front Gorlos Mongol Autonomous County	前郭尔罗斯蒙古族自治县	Qián'guō'ěrluósī Měnggǔzú Zìzhìxiàn	Mongol	Mongol: ᠡᠮᠦᠨᠡᠳᠦ ᠭᠣᠷᠯᠣᠰ ᠢᠨ ᠮᠣᠩᠭᠣᠯ ᠥᠪᠡᠷᠲᠡᠭᠡᠨ ᠵᠠᠰᠠᠬᠤ ᠰᠢᠶᠠᠨ; Emünedü Ɣorlos-in Moŋɣol öbertegen jasaqu siyan
Jilin	Yitong Manchu Autonomous County	伊通满族自治县	Yītōng Mǎnzú Zìzhìxiàn	Manchu	Manchu: ᡳᡨᡠᠩ ᠮᠠᠨᠵᡠ ᠪᡝᠶᡝ ᡩᠠᠰᠠᠩᡤᠠ ᠰᡳᠶᠠᠨ; Itung manju beye dasangga siyan
Liaoning	Harqin Left Wing Mongol Autonomous County	喀喇沁左翼蒙古族自治县	Kālāqìn Zuǒyì Měnggǔzú Zìzhìxiàn	Mongol	Mongol: ᠬᠠᠷᠠᠴᠢᠨ ᠵᠡᠭᠦᠨ ᠭᠠᠷᠤᠨ ᠮᠣᠩᠭᠣᠯ ᠥᠪᠡᠷᠲᠡᠭᠡᠨ ᠵᠠᠰᠠᠬᠤ ᠰᠢᠶᠠᠨ; Qaračin Jegün Ɣarun Moŋɣol öbertegen jasaqu siyan
Liaoning	Fuxin Mongol Autonomous County	阜新蒙古族自治县	Fùxīn Měnggǔzú Zìzhìxiàn	Mongol	Mongol: ᠹᠦᠰᠢᠨ ᠦ ᠮᠣᠩᠭᠣᠯ ᠥᠪᠡᠷᠲᠡᠭᠡᠨ ᠵᠠᠰᠠᠬᠤ ᠰᠢᠶᠠᠨ; Füsin-ü Moŋɣol öbertegen jasaqu siyan
Liaoning	Xinbin Manchu Autonomous County	新宾满族自治县	Xīnbīn Mǎnzú Zìzhìxiàn	Manchu	Manchu: ᠰᡳᠨᠪᡳᠨ ᠮᠠᠨᠵᡠ ᠪᡝᠶᡝ ᡩᠠᠰᠠᠩᡤᠠ ᠰᡳᠶᠠᠨ; Sinbin manju beye dasangga siyan
Liaoning	Qingyuan Manchu Autonomous County	清原满族自治县	Qīngyuán Mǎnzú Zìzhìxiàn	Manchu	Manchu: ᠴᡳᠩᠶᡠᠸᠠᠨ ᠮᠠᠨᠵᡠ ᠪᡝᠶᡝ ᡩᠠᠰᠠᠩᡤᠠ ᠰᡳᠶᠠᠨ; Cingyuwan manju beye dasangga siyan
Liaoning	Benxi Manchu Autonomous County	本溪满族自治县	Běnxī Mǎnzú Zìzhìxiàn	Manchu	Manchu: ᠪᡝᠨᠰᡳ ᠮᠠᠨᠵᡠ ᠪᡝᠶᡝ ᡩᠠᠰᠠᠩᡤᠠ ᠰᡳᠶᠠᠨ; Bensi manju beye dasangga siyan
Liaoning	Huanren Manchu Autonomous County	桓仁满族自治县	Huánrén Mǎnzú Zìzhìxiàn	Manchu	Manchu: ᡥᡠᠸᠠᠨᡵᡝᠨ ᠮᠠᠨᠵᡠ ᠪᡝᠶᡝ ᡩᠠᠰᠠᠩᡤᠠ ᠰᡳᠶᠠᠨ; Huwanren manju beye dasangga siyan
Liaoning	Xiuyan Manchu Autonomous County	岫岩满族自治县	Xiùyán Mǎnzú Zìzhìxiàn	Manchu	Manchu: ᠰᡳᡠᠶᠠᠨ ᠮᠠᠨᠵᡠ ᠪᡝᠶᡝ ᡩᠠᠰᠠᠩᡤᠠ ᠰᡳᠶᠠᠨ; Siuyan manju beye dasangga siyan
Liaoning	Kuandian Manchu Autonomous County	宽甸满族自治县	Kuāndiàn Mǎnzú Zìzhìxiàn	Manchu	Manchu: ᡴᡠᠸᠠᠨᡩᡳᠶᠠᠨ ᠮᠠᠨᠵᡠ ᠪᡝᠶᡝ ᡩᠠᠰᠠᠩᡤᠠ ᠰᡳᠶᠠᠨ; Kuwandiyan manju beye dasangga siyan
Qinghai	Datong Hui and Tu Autonomous County	大通回族土族自治县	Dàtōng Huízú Tǔzú Zìzhìxiàn	Hui and Tu	(The Hui speak Chinese); Xiao'erjing: دَاتْو خُوِذُو تُوذُو ذِجِشِیًا
Qinghai	Henan Mongol Autonomous County	河南蒙古自治县	Hénán Ménggǔ Zìzhìxiàn	Mongol	Mongol: ᠡᡁᠨᠠᠨ ᠮᠣᠩᠭᠣᠯ ᠥᠪᠡᠷᠲᠡᠭᠡᠨ ᠵᠠᠰᠠᠬᠤ ᠰᠢᠶᠠᠨ; Ežnan Moŋɣol öbertegen jasaqu siyan
Qinghai	Hualong Hui Autonomous County	化隆回族自治县	Huàlóng Huízú Zìzhìxiàn	Hui	(The Hui speak Chinese); Xiao'erjing: خُوَلْو خُوِذُو ذِجِشِیًا
Qinghai	Huzhu Tu Autonomous County	互助土族自治县	Hùzhù Tǔzú Zìzhìxiàn	Tu	Monguor: Huzhu Mongghul njeenaa daglagu xan
Qinghai	Menyuan Hui Autonomous County	门源回族自治县	Ményuán Huízú Zìzhìxiàn	Hui	(The Hui speak Chinese); Xiao'erjing: مٍیُوًا خُوِذُو ذِجِشِیًا
Qinghai	Minhe Hui and Tu Autonomous County	民和回族土族自治县	Mínhé Huízú Tǔzú Zìzhìxiàn	Hui and Tu	(The Hui speak Chinese); Xiao'erjing: مٍحْ خُوِذُو تُوذُو ذِجِشِیًا
Qinghai	Xunhua Salar Autonomous County	循化撒拉族自治县	Xúnhuà Sǎlázú Zìzhìxiàn	Salar	Salar: Göxdeñiz Velayat Yisır Salır Özbaşdak Yurt
Sichuan	Beichuan Qiang Autonomous County	北川羌族自治县	Běichuān Qiāngzú Zìzhìxiàn	Qiang	?
Sichuan	Ebian Yi Autonomous County	峨边彝族自治县	Ébiān Yízú Zìzhìxiàn	Yi	Yi: ꏦꍠꆈꌠꊨꏦꏱꅉꑤ
Sichuan	Mabian Yi Autonomous County	马边彝族自治县	Mǎbiān Yízú Zìzhìxiàn	Yi	Yi: ꂷꀜꆈꌠꊨꏦꏱꅉꑤ
Sichuan	Muli Tibetan Autonomous County	木里藏族自治县	Mùlǐ Zàngzú Zìzhìxiàn	Tibetan	Tibetan: མི་ལི་རང་སྐྱོང་རྫོང་ Mi-li rang-skyong-rdzong
Xinjiang	Barkol Kazak Autonomous County	巴里坤哈萨克自治县	Bālǐkūn Hāsàkèzú Zìzhìxiàn	Kazakh	Kazakh: باركول قازاق اۆتونوميالىق اۋدانى; Barköl Qazaq avtonomyalıq awdanı
Xinjiang	Hoboksar Mongol Autonomous County	和布克塞尔蒙古自治县	Hébùkèsài'ěr Ménggǔ Zìzhìxiàn	Mongol	Mongol: ᠬᠣᠪᠤᠭ᠎ᠠ ᠰᠠᠢᠷᠢ ᠶᠢᠨ ᠮᠣᠩᠭ᠋ᠣᠯ ᠥᠪᠡᠷᠲᠡᠭᠡᠨ ᠵᠠᠰᠠᠬᠤ ᠰᡳᠶᠠᠨ; Qobuɣ-a Sairi-yin Moŋɣol öbertegen jasaqu siyan Oirat: ᡍᡆᡋᡇᡎᠰᠠᡅᠷ ᡏᡆᡊᡎᡆᠯ ᡄᡋᡄᠷᡄᡃᠨ ᠴᠠᠰᠠᡍᡇ ᠱᡅᡕᠠᠨ; Xobuqsair mongγol ebereen zasaxu šiyan
Xinjiang	Mori Kazak Autonomous County	木垒哈萨克自治县	Mùlěi Hāsàkèzú Zìzhìxiàn	Kazakh	Kazakh: موري قازاق اۆتونوميالىق اۋدانى; Morï Qazaq avtonomyalıq awdanı
Xinjiang	Qapqal Xibe Autonomous County	察布查尔锡伯自治县	Chábùchá'ěr Xíbó Zìzhìxiàn	Xibe	Xibe: ᠴᠠᠪᠴᠠᠯ ᠰᡳᠪᡝ ᠪᡝᠶᡝ ᡩᠠᠰᠠᠩᡤᠠ ᠰᡳᠶᠠᠨ; Čabčal Sibe beye dasaŋga siyan
Xinjiang	Taxkorgan Tajik Autonomous County	塔什库尔干塔吉克自治县	Tǎshíkù'ěrgàn Tǎjíkè Zìzhìxiàn	Tajiks	Sariquli Tajik: Toxkhürghon Tujik oftunum noya
Xinjiang	Yanqi Hui Autonomous County	焉耆回族自治县	Yānqí Huízú Zìzhìxiàn	Hui	(The Hui speak Chinese); Xiao'erjing: یًاٿِ خُوِذُو ذِجِشِیًا
Yunnan	Cangyuan Va Autonomous County	沧源佤族自治县	Cāngyuán Wǎzú Zìzhìxiàn	Va	?
Yunnan	Eshan Yi Autonomous County	峨山彝族自治县	Èshān Yìzú Zìzhìxiàn	Yi	Yi: ꊉꎭꆈꌠꊨꏦꏱꅉꑤ
Yunnan	Gengma Dai and Va Autonomous County	耿马傣族佤族自治县	Gěngmǎ Dǎizú Wǎzú Zìzhìxiàn	Dai and Va	?
Yunnan	Gongshan Dulong and Nu Autonomous County	贡山独龙族怒族自治县	Gòngshān Dúlóngzú Nùzú Zìzhìxiàn	Derung and Nu	?
Yunnan	Hekou Yao Autonomous County	河口瑶族自治县	Hékǒu Yáozú Zìzhìxiàn	Yao	?
Yunnan	Jiangcheng Hani and Yi Autonomous County	江城哈尼族彝族自治县	Jiāngchéng Hānízú Yízú Zìzhìxiàn	Hani and Yi	Yi: ꏦꍰꉳꆀꋇꆈꌠꊨꏦꏱꅉꑤ
Yunnan	Jingdong Yi Autonomous County	景东彝族自治县	Jǐngdōng Yìzú Zìzhìxiàn	Yi	Yi: ꁷꊭꄏꆈꌠꊨꏦꏱꅉꑤ
Yunnan	Jinggu Dai and Yi Autonomous County	景谷傣族彝族自治县	Jǐnggǔ Dǎizú Yízú Zìzhìxiàn	Dai and Yi	Yi: ꏢꇵꄅꋇꆈꌠꊨꏦꏱꅉꑤ
Yunnan	Jinping Miao, Yao and Dai Autonomous County	金平苗族瑶族傣族自治县	Jīnpíng Miáozú Yáozú Dǎizú Zìzhìxiàn	Miao, Yao and Dai	?
Yunnan	Lancang Lahu Autonomous County	澜沧拉祜族自治县	Láncāng Lāhùzú Zìzhìxiàn	Lahu	?
Yunnan	Lanping Bai and Pumi Autonomous County	兰坪白族普米族自治县	Lánpíng Báizú Pǔmǐzú Zìzhìxiàn	Bai and Pumi	?
Yunnan	Luquan Yi and Miao Autonomous County	禄劝彝族苗族自治县	Lùquàn Yízú Miáozú Zìzhìxiàn	Yi and Miao	Yi: ꇑꐇꆈꌠꂯꑿꊨꏦꏱꅉꑤ
Yunnan	Menglian Dai, Lahu and Va Autonomous County	孟连傣族拉祜族佤族自治县	Mènglián Dǎizú Lāhùzú Wǎzú Zìzhìxiàn	Dai, Lahu and Va	?
Yunnan	Mojiang Hani Autonomous County	墨江哈尼族自治县	Mòjiāng Hānízú Zìzhìxiàn	Hani	?
Yunnan	Nanjian Yi Autonomous County	南涧彝族自治县	Nánjiàn Yìzú Zìzhìxiàn	Yi	Yi: ꇂꏦꆈꌠꊨꏦꏱꅉꑤ
Yunnan	Ninglang Yi Autonomous County	宁蒗彝族自治县	Nínglàng Yìzú Zìzhìxiàn	Yi	Yi: ꆀꆿꆈꌠꊨꏦꏱꅉꑤ
Yunnan	Pingbian Miao Autonomous County	屏边苗族自治县	Píngbiān Miáozú Zìzhìxiàn	Miao	?
Yunnan	Ning'er Hani and Yi Autonomous County	宁洱哈尼族彝族自治县	Níng'ěr Hānízú Yízú Zìzhìxiàn	Hani and Yi	Yi: ꆀꑣꉳꆀꋇꆈꌠꊨꏦꏱꅉꑤ
Yunnan	Shilin Yi Autonomous County	石林彝族自治县	Shílín Yáozú Zìzhìxiàn	Yi	Yi: ꇓꁧꆈꌠꊨꏦꏱꅉꑤ
Yunnan	Shuangjiang Lahu, Va, Blang and Dai Autonomous County	双江拉祜族佤族布朗族傣族自治县	Shuāngjiāng Lāhùzú Wǎzú Bùlǎngzú Dǎizú Zìzhìxiàn	Lahu, Va, Blang and Dai	?
Yunnan	Weishan Yi and Hui Autonomous County	巍山彝族回族自治县	Wēishān Yízú Huízú Zìzhìxiàn	Yi and Hui	(The Hui speak Chinese); Xiao'erjing: وِشً یِذُو خُوِذُو ذِجِشِیًا; Yi: ꊈꎭꆈꌠꉇꉈꊨꏦꏱꅉꑤ
Yunnan	Ximeng Va Autonomous County	西盟佤族自治县	Xīméng Wǎzú Zìzhìxiàn	Va	?
Yunnan	Xinping Yi and Dai Autonomous County	新平彝族傣族自治县	Xīnpíng Yìzú Dǎizú Zìzhìxiàn	Yi and Dai	Yi: ꑟꀻꆈꌠꄅꋇꊨꏦꏱꅉꑤ
Yunnan	Xundian Hui and Yi Autonomous County	寻甸回族彝族自治县	Xúndiàn Huízú Yízú Zìzhìxiàn	Hui and Yi	(The Hui speak Chinese); Xiao'erjing: ثٌدِیًا خُوِذُو یِذُو ذِجِشِیًا
Yunnan	Weixi Lisu Autonomous County	维西傈僳族自治县	Wéixī Lìsùzú Zìzhìxiàn	Lisu	Lisu: ꓪꓰꓲ-ꓫꓲꓸ ꓡꓲ-ꓢꓴ ꓫꓵꓽ ꓝꓲꓸ ꓛꓬꓽ ꓫꓯꓽ
Yunnan	Yangbi Yi Autonomous County	漾濞彝族自治县	Yàngbì Yìzú Zìzhìxiàn	Yi	Yi: ꃺꆚꆈꌠꊨꏦꏱꅉꑤ
Yunnan	Yuanjiang Hani, Yi and Dai Autonomous County	元江哈尼族彝族傣族自治县	Yuánjiāng Hānízú Dǎizú Yízú Zìzhìxiàn	Hani, Yi and Dai	Yi: ꑼꏦꉳꆀꋇꆈꌠꄅꋇꊨꏦꏱꅉꑤ
Yunnan	Yulong Nakhi Autonomous County	玉龙纳西族自治县	Yùlóng Nàxīzú Zìzhìxiàn	Nakhi	?
Yunnan	Zhenyuan Yi, Hani and Lahu Autonomous County	镇沅彝族哈尼族拉祜族自治县	Zhènyuán Yízú Hānízú Lāhùzú Zìzhìxiàn	Yi, Hani and Lahu	Yi: ꍔꑼꆈꌠꉳꆀꋇꇁꃚꋇꊨꏦꏱꅉꑤ
Zhejiang	Jingning She Autonomous County	景宁畲族自治县	Jǐngníng Shézú Zìzhìxiàn	She	?

== History ==
Year	Number of created autonomy counties in year	Total
1950	4	4
1951	2	6
1952	3	9
1953	6	15
1954	16	31
1955	5	36
1956	10	46
1957	1	47
1958	5	52
1962	1	53
1963	4	57
1964	1	58
1965	2	60
1966	1	61
1979	2	63
1980	2	65
1981	2	67
1983	2	69
1984	10	79
1985	10	89
1986	2	91
1987	16	107
1988	1	108
1989	1	109
1990	9	118
2002	1	119
2003	1	120

== Former autonomous counties of China ==
Province-level entry	Name	Date formed	Date disbanded
Guizhou Province	Anlong Buyei and Miao Autonomous County	13 November 1965	21 September 1981
Liaoning Province	Beizhen Manchu Autonomous County	29 June 1989	21 March 1995
Guizhou Province	Ceheng Buyei Autonomous County	13 November 1965	21 September 1981
Guizhou Province	Danzhai Miao Autonomous County	7 January 1955	18 April 1956
Hainan Province	Dongfang Li Autonomous County	20 November 1987	12 March 1997
Guangxi Zhuang Autonomous Region	Fangcheng Pan-Ethnicities Autonomous County	25 December 1978	23 May 1993
Guangxi Zhuang Autonomous Region	Shiwandashan Zhuang and Yao Autonomous County	26 March 1957	22 February 1958
Guangxi Zhuang Autonomous Region	Dongxing Pan-Ethnicities Autonomous County	22 February 1958	25 December 1978
Liaoning Province	Fengcheng Manchu Autonomous County	17 January 1985	8 March 1994
Gansu Province	Guangtong Hui Autonomous County	14 May 1955	11 September 1956
Hubei Province	Hefeng Tujia Autonomous County	20 April 1980	19 August 1983
Guizhou Province	Huishui Buyei and Miao Autonomous County	7 January 1955	18 April 1956
Guizhou Province	Huishui Buyei and Miao Autonomous County	20 May 1963	23 October 1963
Gansu Province	Jingyuan Hui Autonomous County	24 March 1955	5 September 1958
Hubei Province	Laifeng Tujia Autonomous County	19 December 1979	19 August 1983
Guizhou Province	Leishan Miao Autonomous County	26 December 1955	18 April 1956
Guizhou Province	Luodian Buyei Autonomous County	7 January 1955	18 April 1956
Guizhou Province	Lushan Miao Autonomous County	26 December 1955	18 April 1956
Sichuan Province	Maowen Qiang Autonomous County	21 April 1958	24 July 1987
Yunnan Province	Mile Yi Autonomous County	3 January 1955	6 September 1957
Chongqing	Qianjiang Tujia and Miao Autonomous County	14 November 1983	25 June 2000
Guangxi Zhuang Autonomous Region	Qinbei Zhuang Autonomous County	26 March 1957	26 March 1959
Guangdong Province	Qinzhou Zhuang Autonomous County	14 September 1963	19 July 1965
Guizhou Province	Taijiang Miao Autonomous County	26 December 1955	18 March 1956
Guizhou Province	Wangmo Buyei and Miao Autonomous County	13 November 1965	21 September 1981
Sichuan Province	Yanyuan Yi Autonomous County	23 October 1963	13 December 1978
Guizhou Province	Zhenfeng Buyei and Miao Autonomous County	13 November 1965	21 September 1981

== See also ==
- District (China) § Ethnic districts
