= Wu Feng =

Wu Feng may refer to:

- Wu Feng (Qing dynasty) (1699–1769), Qing dynasty merchant allegedly killed by Taiwanese aboriginals
- Wu Feng (engineer) (1951–2025), Chinese engineer
- Uğur Rıfat Karlova (born 1980), Turkish-Taiwanese television host, known by the stage name Wu Feng

== See also ==
- Wufeng (disambiguation)
