= Xiushan Tujia and Miao Autonomous County =

Xiushan 秀山县 Siushan
- Autonomous County
- 秀山土家族苗族自治县
- Location of Xiushan County in Chongqing
- Coordinates: 28.5081°N 108.992°E
- Country: China
- Municipality: Chongqing
- County seat: Zhonghe Subdistrict

Area
  - Total: 2,450 km^{2} (950 sq mi)

Population (2020 census)
  - Total: 496,194
  - Density: 203/km^{2} (525/sq mi)
- Time zone: UTC+8 (China Standard)
- Website: www.cqxs.gov.cn

Xiushan Tujia and Miao Autonomous County (Chinese: 秀山土家族苗族自治县; pinyin: Xiùshān Tǔjiāzú Miáozú Zìzhìxiàn), or Xiushan County for short, is located in the southeast of Chongqing Municipality, China. It is the municipality's southernmost county-level division.

== Administrative divisions ==
The county administers 4 subdistricts, 17 towns, and 6 townships.

- Zhonghe Subdistrict (中和街道)
- Wuyang Subdistrict (乌杨街道)
- Pingkai Subdistrict (平凯街道)
- Guanzhuang Subdistrict (官庄街道)
- Qingxichang Town (清溪场镇)
- Aikou Town (隘口镇)
- Rongxi Town (溶溪镇)
- Longchi Town (龙池镇)
- Shidi Town (石堤镇)
- Erong Town (峨溶镇)
- Hong'an Town (洪安镇)
- Yajiang Town (雅江镇)
- Shiye Town (石耶镇)
- Meijiang Town (梅江镇)
- Lanqiao Town (兰桥镇)
- Gaotian Town (膏田镇)
- Xikou Town (溪口镇)
- Miaoquan Town (妙泉镇)
- Songnong Town (宋农镇)
- Liren Town (里仁镇)
- Zhongling Town (钟灵镇)
- Xiaoxi Township (孝溪乡)
- Haiyang Township (海洋乡)
- Daxi Township (大溪乡)
- Yongdong Township (涌洞乡)
- Zhongping Township (中平乡)
- Cenxi Township (岑溪乡)

== Climate ==
Climate data for Xiushan, elevation 364 m (1,194 ft), (1991–2020 normals, extremes 1981–present)
Month	Jan	Feb	Mar	Apr	May	Jun	Jul	Aug	Sep	Oct	Nov	Dec	Year
Record high °C (°F)	23.7 (74.7)	29.2 (84.6)	33.0 (91.4)	35.2 (95.4)	35.6 (96.1)	36.9 (98.4)	38.8 (101.8)	39.4 (102.9)	38.9 (102.0)	35.6 (96.1)	30.3 (86.5)	22.1 (71.8)	39.4 (102.9)
Mean daily maximum °C (°F)	8.8 (47.8)	11.1 (52.0)	15.8 (60.4)	21.9 (71.4)	26.1 (79.0)	28.9 (84.0)	31.9 (89.4)	31.9 (89.4)	28.0 (82.4)	21.8 (71.2)	16.7 (62.1)	11.1 (52.0)	21.2 (70.1)
Daily mean °C (°F)	5.4 (41.7)	7.5 (45.5)	11.5 (52.7)	17.1 (62.8)	21.3 (70.3)	24.5 (76.1)	27.3 (81.1)	26.8 (80.2)	23.1 (73.6)	17.6 (63.7)	12.6 (54.7)	7.4 (45.3)	16.8 (62.3)
Mean daily minimum °C (°F)	3.0 (37.4)	5.1 (41.2)	8.5 (47.3)	13.6 (56.5)	17.8 (64.0)	21.4 (70.5)	23.8 (74.8)	23.1 (73.6)	19.7 (67.5)	14.7 (58.5)	9.8 (49.6)	4.9 (40.8)	13.8 (56.8)
Record low °C (°F)	−3.7 (25.3)	−3.0 (26.6)	−0.9 (30.4)	4.0 (39.2)	7.6 (45.7)	14.3 (57.7)	16.9 (62.4)	16.3 (61.3)	11.7 (53.1)	4.7 (40.5)	−0.7 (30.7)	−2.9 (26.8)	−3.7 (25.3)
Average precipitation mm (inches)	36.7 (1.44)	45.0 (1.77)	73.3 (2.89)	122.4 (4.82)	187.6 (7.39)	209.3 (8.24)	207.7 (8.18)	167.7 (6.60)	103.8 (4.09)	117.8 (4.64)	59.4 (2.34)	29.3 (1.15)	1,360 (53.55)
Average precipitation days (≥ 0.1 mm)	12.6	13.5	15.9	16.6	17.8	17.0	14.8	12.9	11.0	14.6	12.0	10.8	169.5
Average snowy days	4.5	2.6	0.8	0	0	0	0	0	0	0	0	1.6	9.5
Average relative humidity (%)	79	80	78	79	79	82	78	77	78	82	81	79	79
Mean monthly sunshine hours	39.2	37.9	65.7	82.0	97.4	95.2	154.8	161.0	116.5	81.0	66.5	49.9	1,047.1
Percentage possible sunshine	12	12	18	21	23	23	37	40	32	23	21	16	23
Source: China Meteorological Administration
