= Yinjiang Tujia and Miao Autonomous County =

Yinjiang County 印江县 · Yinv jiangr xianr Yinkiang
- Autonomous county
- 印江土家族苗族自治县; Yinv jiangr Bif Ziv Kar hev Bef Kar zouf xengv xianr Yinjiang Tujia and Miao Autonomous County
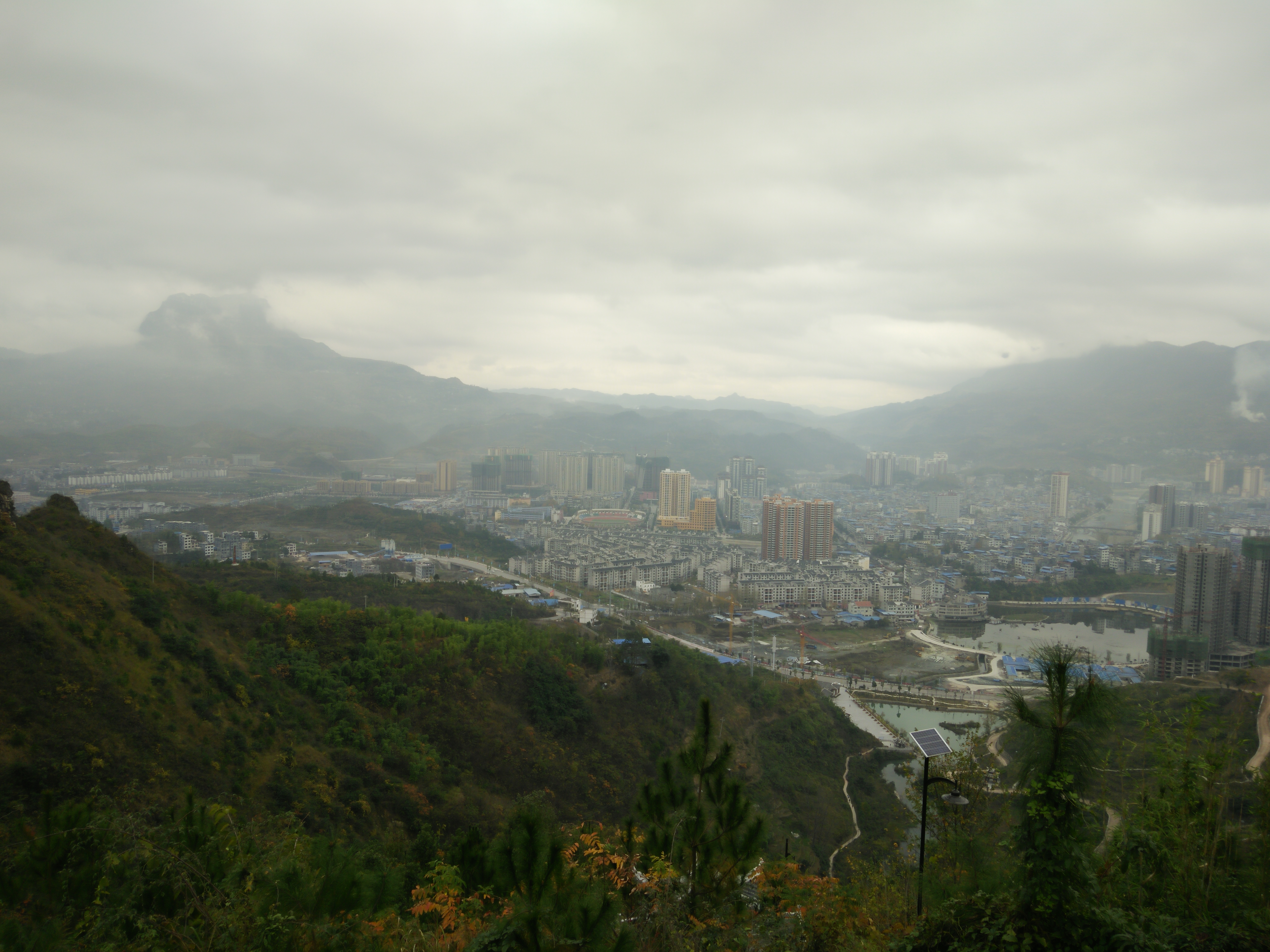

- Location of the seat in Guizhou Yinjiang (Southwest China)
- Coordinates (Yinjiang County government): 27°59′39″N 108°24′35″E
- Country: China
- Province: Guizhou
- Prefecture-level city: Tongren
- County seat: Eling Subdistrict

Area
  - Total: 1,969.1 km^{2} (760.3 sq mi)

Population (2020 census)
  - Total: 294,490
  - Density: 149.56/km^{2} (387.35/sq mi)
- Time zone: UTC+8 (China Standard)
- Website: www.yinjiang.gov.cn

Yinjiang Tujia and Miao Autonomous County (simplified Chinese: 印江土家族苗族自治县; traditional Chinese: 印江土家族苗族自治縣; pinyin: Yìnjiāng Tǔjiāzú Miáozú Zìzhìxiàn; Tujia: Yinv jiangr Bif Ziv Kar hev Bef Kar zouf xengv xianr) is a county in the northeast of Guizhou province, China. It is under the administration of the prefecture-level city of Tongren.

== Administrative divisions ==
Yinjiang is divided into 3 subdistricts, 13 towns and 1 township:

- Eling Subdistrict (峨岭街道)
- Longjin Subdistrict (龙津街道)
- Zhongxing Subdistrict (中兴街道)
- Banxi Town (板溪镇)
- Shazipo Town (沙子坡镇)
- Tiantang Town (天堂镇)
- Muhuang Town (木黄镇)
- Heshui Town (合水镇)
- Langxi Town (朗溪镇)
- Chanxi Town (缠溪镇)
- Yangxi Town (洋溪镇)
- Xinzhai Town (新寨镇)
- Shanshu Town (杉树镇)
- Ziwei Town (紫薇镇)
- Daoba Town (刀坝镇)
- Yangliu Town (杨柳镇)
- Luochang Township (罗场乡)
- Xinye Township (新业乡)

== Climate ==
Climate data for Yinjiang, elevation 522 m (1,713 ft), (1991–2020 normals, extremes 1981–2010)
Month	Jan	Feb	Mar	Apr	May	Jun	Jul	Aug	Sep	Oct	Nov	Dec	Year
Record high °C (°F)	26.1 (79.0)	32.2 (90.0)	35.5 (95.9)	34.6 (94.3)	37.5 (99.5)	37.5 (99.5)	39.5 (103.1)	39.6 (103.3)	38.6 (101.5)	34.5 (94.1)	30.2 (86.4)	24.0 (75.2)	39.6 (103.3)
Mean daily maximum °C (°F)	9.3 (48.7)	12.3 (54.1)	17.0 (62.6)	22.8 (73.0)	26.8 (80.2)	29.4 (84.9)	32.6 (90.7)	32.7 (90.9)	28.7 (83.7)	22.5 (72.5)	17.6 (63.7)	11.6 (52.9)	21.9 (71.5)
Daily mean °C (°F)	5.7 (42.3)	8.0 (46.4)	12.0 (53.6)	17.2 (63.0)	21.3 (70.3)	24.4 (75.9)	26.9 (80.4)	26.4 (79.5)	22.9 (73.2)	17.6 (63.7)	12.7 (54.9)	7.6 (45.7)	16.9 (62.4)
Mean daily minimum °C (°F)	3.3 (37.9)	5.2 (41.4)	8.7 (47.7)	13.5 (56.3)	17.5 (63.5)	21.0 (69.8)	22.9 (73.2)	22.3 (72.1)	19.0 (66.2)	14.6 (58.3)	9.8 (49.6)	4.9 (40.8)	13.6 (56.4)
Record low °C (°F)	−3.6 (25.5)	−4.1 (24.6)	−2.6 (27.3)	3.8 (38.8)	8.1 (46.6)	13.8 (56.8)	16.0 (60.8)	16.4 (61.5)	11.0 (51.8)	5.3 (41.5)	−0.7 (30.7)	−3.7 (25.3)	−4.1 (24.6)
Average precipitation mm (inches)	25.5 (1.00)	26.6 (1.05)	48.1 (1.89)	111.3 (4.38)	168.4 (6.63)	206.5 (8.13)	169.7 (6.68)	113.9 (4.48)	85.1 (3.35)	96.7 (3.81)	47.7 (1.88)	21.5 (0.85)	1,121 (44.13)
Average precipitation days (≥ 0.1 mm)	11.5	10.4	13.6	15.5	16.9	16.2	13.3	11.5	10.5	14.7	10.7	9.9	154.7
Average snowy days	3.8	1.7	0.4	0	0	0	0	0	0	0	0	1.3	7.2
Average relative humidity (%)	78	76	77	79	80	82	79	78	79	82	81	78	79
Mean monthly sunshine hours	33.2	41.2	66.3	86.5	105.4	98.2	169.6	177.5	122.9	76.6	65.8	46.7	1,089.9
Percentage possible sunshine	10	13	18	22	25	24	40	44	34	22	21	15	24
Source: China Meteorological Administration
