= Baishou Dance =

The Baishou Dance or baishouwu (摆手舞, literally 'hand-waving dance') is a 500-year-old historic group dance of the Tujia, one of 55 ethnic minorities in China. The dance uses 70 ritual gestures to represent war, farming, hunting, courtship and other aspects of traditional life.

== Literature ==
The Tujia nationality Baishou dance in Xiangxi, Hunan province best reflects the ethnic flavor and ancient customs of the Tujia nationality. It is popular in Longshan county, Baojing county and Yongshun county, Xiangxi Tujia-Miao Autonomous Prefecture, Hunan province. The dance is usually performed from the third to the fifteenth day of the first lunar month. It originates from an ancestor worship ceremony and dates back nearly 1,000 years ago, according to the broken stele in the Temple of Eight Clan Leaders (Qing Dynasty) and the county annals.

The Tujia nationality baishou dance integrates singing, dancing, music and opera elements. It presents numerous topics concerning history and human existence, including the creation of the world, human reproduction, migration, hunting & fishing, sericulture & weaving, slash-and-burn cultivation, ancient stories, myths, legends and daily life. The dance uses ritual gestures. Dancers' movements and postures are powerful and aesthetic. They wave one hand, wave two hands, wave hand(s) when circling around, or wave hand(s) with foot movements. The dance, usually performed on level ground, can be classified into grand baishou and small-scale baishou. The grand baishou is performed by over 1,000 dancers when offering sacrifices to Tujia ancestors and is watched by over 10,000 spectators; the small-scale baishou is performed on a small scale when offering sacrifices to ancestors with the same family name. The music of the dance incorporates vocal accompaniment (starting song and baishou song) and musical accompaniment (drum and gong). The song changes flexibly according to the content and movements of the dance. Dancers' movements and postures indicate power and freedom and feature turning, bending knees, shaking, and lowering the body. The dance is valuable for studying the history, war, religion, migration, farming, life, courtship and folk customs of the Tujia nationality.
