= Wufeng Tujia Autonomous County =

Wufeng County 五峰县
- County
- 五峰土家族自治县; Wufeng Tujia Autonomous County
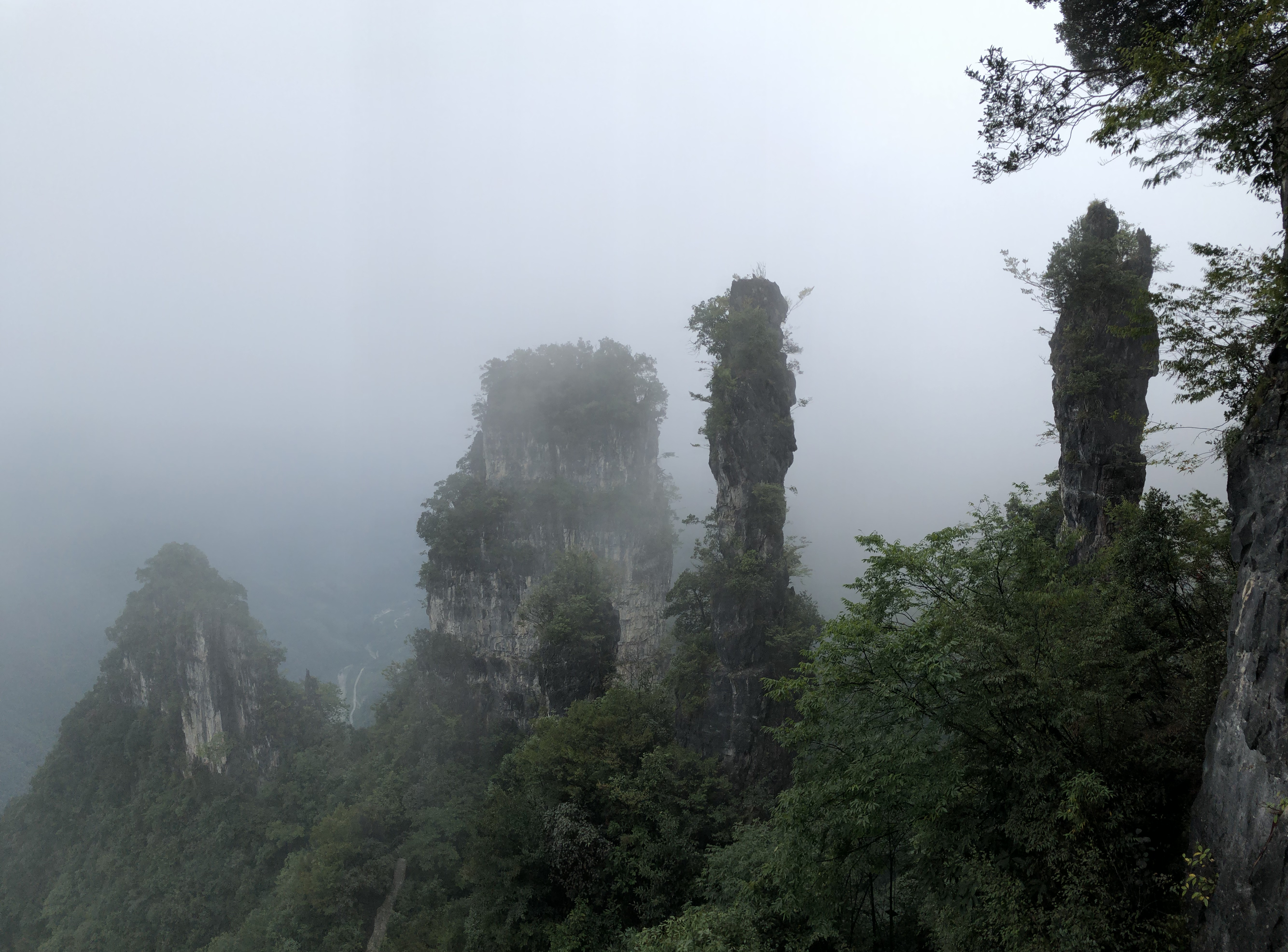
- Wufeng Chai Buxi Grand Canyon Scenic Spot

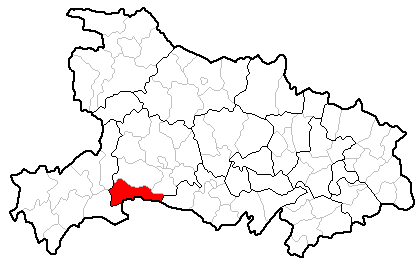
- Wufeng is the southernmost division on this map of Yichang

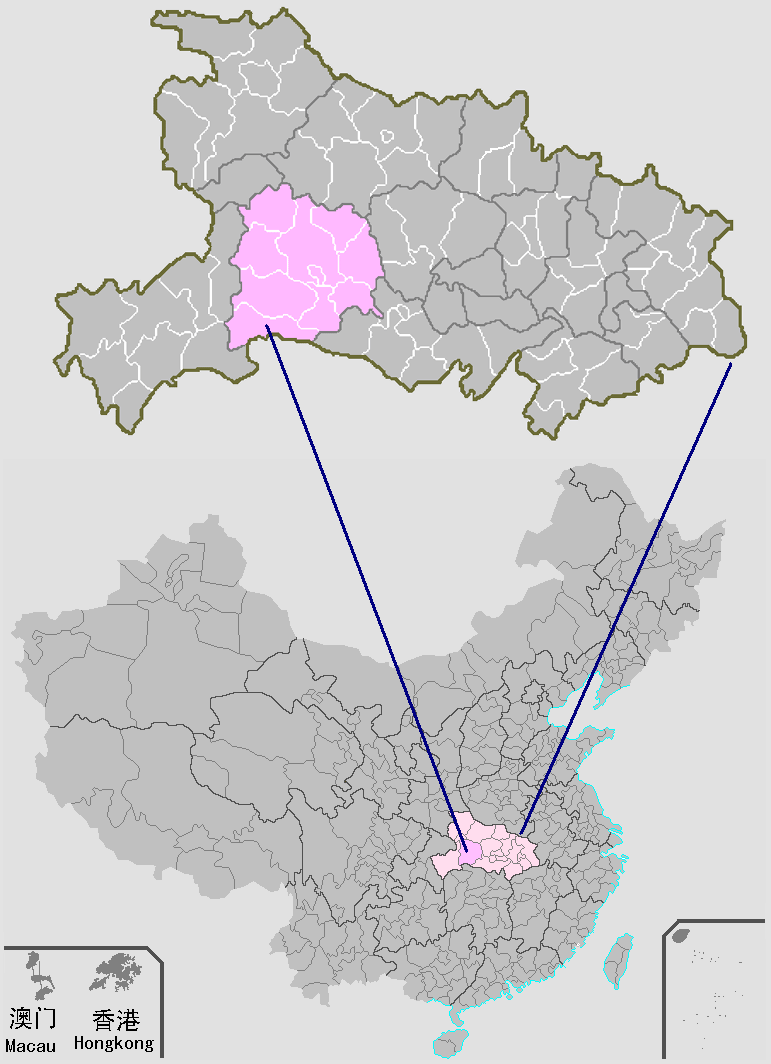
- Yichang in Hubei
- Coordinates: 30°09′25″N 111°04′26″E
- Country: People's Republic of China
- Province: Hubei
- Prefecture-level city: Yichang
- County seat: Yuyangguan Town

Area
  - Total: 2,401 km^{2} (927 sq mi)

Population (2020)
  - Total: 156,026
  - Density: 64.98/km^{2} (168.3/sq mi)
- Time zone: UTC+8 (China Standard)
- Website: www.hbwf.gov.cn

Wufeng Tujia Autonomous County (simplified Chinese: 五峰土家族自治县; traditional Chinese: 五峯土家族自治縣; pinyin: Wǔfēng Tǔjiāzú Zìzhìxiàn), formerly Changle County (Changlo County 長樂縣), is a county in the west of Hubei province, People's Republic of China, bordering Hunan province to the south. It is under the administration of the prefecture-level city of Yichang. It is twinned with Westfield, Massachusetts, United States.

== Administrative divisions ==
Five towns:

- Wufeng (五峰镇), Changleping (长乐坪镇), Yuyangguan (渔洋关镇), Renheping (仁和坪镇), Wantan (湾潭镇)

Three townships:

- Fujiayan Township (付家堰乡), Niuzhuang Township (牛庄乡), Caihua Township (采花乡)

== Climate ==
Climate data for Wufeng, elevation 751 m (2,464 ft), (1991–2020 normals, extremes 1981–present)
Month	Jan	Feb	Mar	Apr	May	Jun	Jul	Aug	Sep	Oct	Nov	Dec	Year
Record high °C (°F)	24.8 (76.6)	26.7 (80.1)	35.7 (96.3)	36.9 (98.4)	36.8 (98.2)	37.2 (99.0)	38.6 (101.5)	38.4 (101.1)	39.2 (102.6)	33.9 (93.0)	28.2 (82.8)	21.0 (69.8)	39.2 (102.6)
Mean daily maximum °C (°F)	8.7 (47.7)	11.3 (52.3)	16.5 (61.7)	22.2 (72.0)	25.8 (78.4)	28.8 (83.8)	31.6 (88.9)	31.3 (88.3)	27.1 (80.8)	21.6 (70.9)	16.3 (61.3)	10.9 (51.6)	21.0 (69.8)
Daily mean °C (°F)	3.7 (38.7)	5.9 (42.6)	10.1 (50.2)	15.3 (59.5)	19.2 (66.6)	22.5 (72.5)	25.1 (77.2)	24.5 (76.1)	20.7 (69.3)	15.6 (60.1)	10.6 (51.1)	5.5 (41.9)	14.9 (58.8)
Mean daily minimum °C (°F)	0.5 (32.9)	2.4 (36.3)	5.8 (42.4)	10.7 (51.3)	14.8 (58.6)	18.4 (65.1)	21.2 (70.2)	20.5 (68.9)	16.9 (62.4)	12.1 (53.8)	7.1 (44.8)	2.1 (35.8)	11.0 (51.9)
Record low °C (°F)	−6.4 (20.5)	−5.2 (22.6)	−2.8 (27.0)	0.9 (33.6)	7.6 (45.7)	11.8 (53.2)	14.3 (57.7)	13.6 (56.5)	9.0 (48.2)	2.9 (37.2)	−1.7 (28.9)	−6.7 (19.9)	−6.7 (19.9)
Average precipitation mm (inches)	22.4 (0.88)	40.6 (1.60)	58.7 (2.31)	129.3 (5.09)	173.6 (6.83)	200.8 (7.91)	240.4 (9.46)	166.5 (6.56)	107.1 (4.22)	100.3 (3.95)	58.9 (2.32)	19.4 (0.76)	1,318 (51.89)
Average precipitation days (≥ 0.1 mm)	9.3	10.3	12.3	15.3	16.1	16.3	16.5	14.8	11.5	13.0	10.2	8.1	153.7
Average snowy days	6.8	3.8	1.7	0.1	0	0	0	0	0	0	0.3	1.7	14.4
Average relative humidity (%)	74	74	73	75	79	80	81	80	80	81	80	75	78
Mean monthly sunshine hours	67.4	59.9	91.8	108.1	125.5	118.0	155.5	163.0	115.4	94.5	86.2	81.1	1,266.4
Percentage possible sunshine	21	19	24	28	30	28	36	40	32	27	27	26	28
Source: China Meteorological Administration All-time January high
