= Waxiang Chinese =

Variety of Chinese

Waxiang
- Waxianghua, Xianghua, Wogang
- Native to: China
- Region: western Hunan
- Ethnicity: Waxiang people
- Native speakers: (300,000 cited 1995)
- Language family: Sino-Tibetan: Sinitic; Chinese; Waxiang
- Early forms: Proto-Sino-Tibetan: Old Chinese

Language codes
- ISO 639-3: wxa
- Glottolog: waxi1236
- Linguasphere: 79-AAA-pd
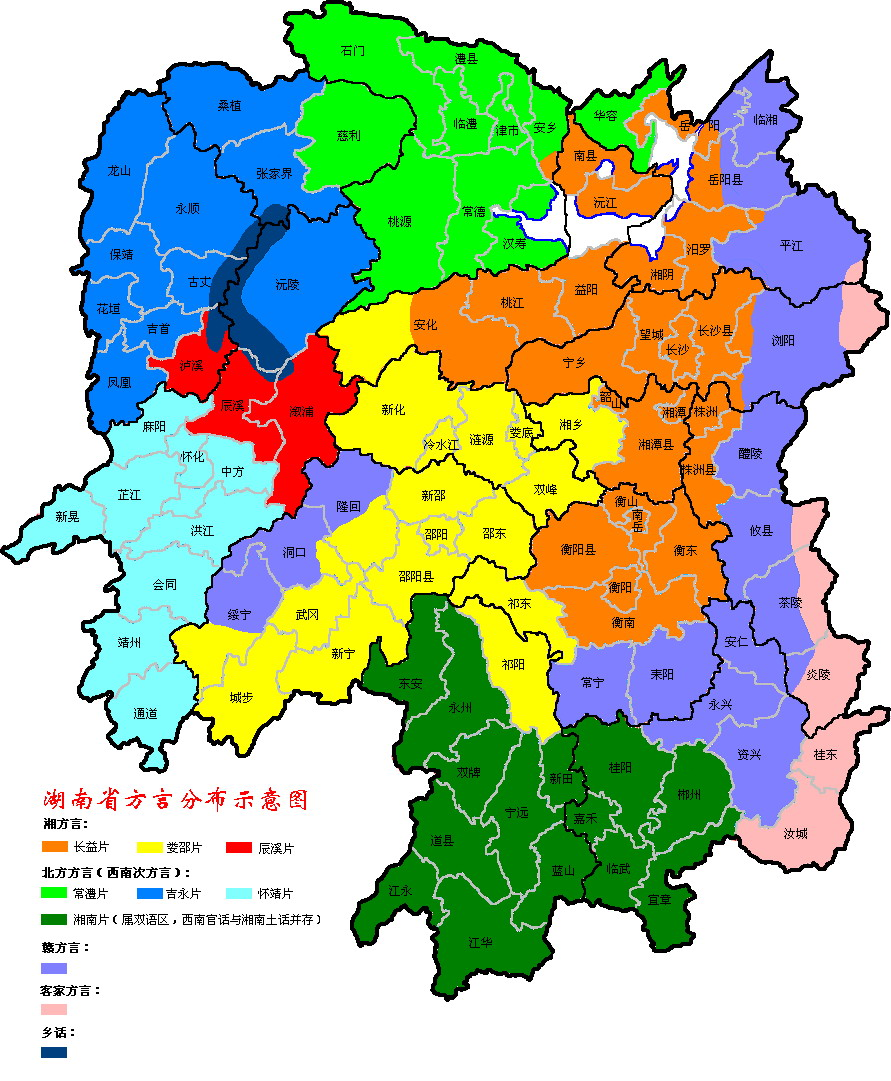
- Dialect map of Hunan. Waxiang is dark blue on the map.

Waxiang (simplified Chinese: 瓦乡话; traditional Chinese: 瓦鄉話; pinyin: Wǎxiānghuà; ɕioŋ˥tsa˧) is a divergent variety of Chinese, spoken by the Waxiang people, an unrecognized ethnic minority group in the northwestern part of Hunan province, China. Waxiang is a distinct language, and is very different from the surrounding Southwestern Mandarin, Xiang Chinese, and the Eastern Miao (Xong) languages.

== Classification ==
Waxiang is widely considered a Chinese variety.

Nevertheless, as noted by Laurent Sagart (2011) and others, Waxiang appears to share some words with the Caijia language of western Guizhou. Sagart (2011) considers Caijia to be a sister of Waxiang. Currently, Waxiang is classified as a divergent Chinese variety rather than a non-Sinitic language. Similarities among Old Chinese, Waxiang, Caijia, and Bai have also been pointed out by Wu & Shen (2010).

Although most Waxiang speakers are classified as ethnic Miao by People's Republic of China, Qu & Tang (2017) show that Waxiang and Miao (Qo Xiong) have had little mutual influence on each other.

== Distribution ==
Waxianghua is found in Luxi, Guzhang and Yongshun counties in Xiangxi Tujia and Miao Autonomous Prefecture, Zhangjiajie prefecture-level city (in Dayong 大庸 ), and Chenxi, Xupu and Yuanling counties in Huaihua prefecture-level city. Neighboring languages include Southwestern Mandarin, Xiang Chinese, Tujia, Qo Xiong, and Hm Nai.

- hua means 'speech' in Mandarin Chinese,
- xiang means 'rural' in Mandarin Chinese
- wa means 'speech' in Southern Chinese dialects.

The word Wa 瓦 is only a phonetic transcription.

Wu & Shen (2010) report Waxianghua to be spoken in the following villages.

- Yuanling County: Qingshuiping 清水坪 , Maxipu 麻溪铺 , Taichang 太常 , Wusu 乌宿 , Liangshuijing 凉水井
- Luxi County: Basheping 八什坪 , Shangbao 上堡 , Liangjiatan 梁家谭 , Baisha 白沙镇
- Guzhang County: Linchang 林场 of Gaowangjie 高望界 , Gaofeng 高峰 (in Taojin 淘金村 , Beishuiping 北水坪 , etc.), Yantouzhai 岩头寨 , Shanzao 山枣 , Yezhu 野竹 , Hepeng 河蓬 , Caotan 草潭
- Chenxi County: Tianwan 田湾 , Banqiao 板桥 , Chuanxiyi 船溪驿 , Tanjiafang 谭家坊
- Xupu County: Rangjiaxi 让家溪 , Daweixi 大渭溪 , Muxi 木溪
- Yongshun County: Limin 里明村 , Zhenxi 镇溪 , Xiaoxi 小溪 of Wangcun Township 王村镇

Liubaohua 六保话 , a dialect closely related to Waxianghua, is spoken in several villages in southeastern Guzhang County (including in Shaojitian Village 筲箕田村, Shanzao Township 山枣乡 ) and parts of Luxi County. Liubaohua is spoken in the following locations (Zou 2013).

- Guzhang County
  - Shanzao Township 山枣乡 : Huoma 火麻村 , Gaozhai 高寨村 , Shaojitian 筲箕田村, Modao 磨刀村
  - Yantouzhai Township 岩头寨乡: Yinping 银坪村 , Zimuping 梓木坪村, Wangouxi 碗沟溪村, etc.
- Luxi County: Basheping Township 八什坪乡
- Yuanling County: Maxipu Town 麻溪铺镇 and Shaojiwan Town 筲箕湾镇

The Nanshan dialect of Waxianghua (Chinese: 南山乡话) is spoken in parts of Chengbu County, Hunan and Longsheng County, Guangxi by about 1,100 Waxiang people who had originally migrated from Yuanling County. Their villages include:

- Chengbu County, Hunan
  - Xuntou Village 巡头村 and Mugua Village 木瓜村, both of which are in Wutuan Town 五团镇
  - Juezhiping Village 蕨枝坪村, Nanshan Town 南山镇
- Longsheng County, Guangxi
  - Ganjia Village 甘甲村, Weishan Township 伟江乡

== Phonology ==
Initials of Guzhang county Waxiang
		Labial	Dental	Alveolar	Palatal	Velar
Nasal		m 尾	n 大	ɲ 银		ŋ 硬
Plosives	voiced	b 婆	d 代	d͡z 融	d͡ʑ 墙	ɡ 渠
Plosives	voiceless	p 布	t 台	t͡s 纸	t͡ɕ 精	k 姑
Plosives	aspirated	pʰ 破	tʰ 兔	t͡sʰ 初	t͡ɕʰ 轿	kʰ 口
Fricatives	voiced		z 油	ʑ 食		ɣ 红
Fricatives	voiceless		s 生	ɕ 四		x 灰
Approximants		v 有	l 李			Ø 矮

== Conservative features ==
Waxiang preserves a number of features of Old Chinese not found in most modern varieties of Chinese, such as the initial *l- (which became a voiced dental stop in Middle Chinese):

- Guzhang li^{6}, 地 OC (Baxter–Sagart) *lˤejs > MC dijH > Mandarin dì 'earth, ground'
- Guzhang lu^{6}, 大 OC *lˤats > MC dajH > Mandarin dà 'big'
- Guzhang li^{2}, 遲 OC *lrəj > MC drij > Mandarin chí 'slow'
- Guzhang luʔ^{8}, 讀 OC *C.lˤok > MC duwk > Mandarin dú 'read'

Waxiang also has some cases of /z/ for Old Chinese *r- (which became l- in Middle Chinese):

- Guzhang za^{2}, 棃 OC *C.rəj > MC lij > Mandarin lí 'pear tree, pear'
- Guzhang zɛ^{2}, 來 OC *mə.rˤək > *rˤə > MC loj > Mandarin lái 'come'

In a number of words, Waxiang and Proto-Min have affricate initials where Middle Chinese has sy-:

- Guzhang tsu^{3}, pMin *tšyi^{B}, 水 OC *s.turʔ > MC sywijX > Mandarin shuǐ 'water'
- Guzhang tɕiəu^{1}, pMin *tšy^{A}, 書 OC *s-ta > MC syo > Mandarin shū 'writing'

In some words, Waxiang and Proto-Min have voiced affricates where Middle Chinese has y-:

- Guzhang dzoŋ^{3}, pMin *-džioŋ^{B}, 癢 OC *Cə.ɢaŋʔ > MC yangX > Mandarin yǎng 'itch'

== Waxiang and Caijia ==
Sagart (2011) argues that Waxiang and Caijia together constitute the earliest branching of Chinese. However, Sagart later retracted this proposal, saying that he is no longer sure whether Waxiang and Caijia actually form a subgroup together.

Like Waxiang, Caijia preserves Old Chinese *l-, has a voiced fricative reflex of *r-, and retains the Old Chinese word 字 'love', which has been replaced by 愛 in all other Chinese varieties. Waxiang and Caijia also share two words not found in other Chinese varieties:

- 'two': Caijia ta⁵⁵, Waxiang tso⁵³, from Old Chinese 再 *tsˤəs 'twice'
- 'milk': Caijia mi⁵⁵, Waxiang mi⁵⁵, which Sagart suggests is a non-Sinitic word
