= Waxiang people =

Ethnic group in China

Total population
- about 400,000

Regions with significant populations
- Hunan, China: Yuanling County; Guzhang County; Luxi County; Yongshun County; Chenxi County; Xupu County; Shimen County; Chengbu Miao Autonomous County; Youyang Tujia and Miao Autonomous County

Languages
- Waxiang Chinese, Southwestern Mandarin, Xiang Chinese

Religion
- Buddhism, traditional religions

Related ethnic groups
- Miao people, Yao people, Han Chinese

The Waxiang people (Chinese: 瓦乡人; pinyin: Wǎxiāngren) are an unrecognized ethnic group living along the Yuan River in Yuanling County of western Hunan, China. They call themselves Huaxiang people (Waxianghua pronunciation: [wa˧ɕioŋ˥]), and speak Waxiang Chinese. Compared to the Han, Miao and Tujia people of the region, they are different in terms of living style, farming and other cultural norms.

== Population and distribution ==
The Waxiang people are an unrecognized ethnic group in China, with a population of about 400,000. Currently, the views of scholars and the Chinese government are usually that Waxiang Chinese, the main language used by Waxiang people, is in the Mandarin subdivision of the Chinese language. The Waxiang people are primarily located in northwestern Hunan province.

== Ethnic group designation ==
Many of the Waxiang people are designated as Miao, while some are designated as Tujia or Han.

According to a study on their physical characteristics, the Waxiang were found to be closest related to the Derung and Lahu people.

== Notable people ==
- Song Zuying: mother is Miao, father is Waxiang.
