= Wuxi, Luxi =

Town in Luxi County, Hunan, China

Coordinates: 28°15′55″N 110°09′12″E

Wuxi (Chinese: 武溪镇; pinyin: Wǔxī Zhèn) is a town and the county seat of Luxi County in Hunan, China. The town is located in the northeast of the county, it is bordered by Xixi Town (洗溪镇) to the west and northwest, Yuanling County to the northeast, Chenxi County to the southeast, and Pushi Town (浦市镇) to the south. It has an area of 179.1 km^{2} (69.2 sq mi) with a population of 112,100 (as of 2015 end). The seat of local government is at Wuxi.
