= Gaocun (disambiguation) =

Gaocun (高村镇) is a town and the county seat of Mayang Miao Autonomous County in Hunan.

Gaocun may also refer to the following Chinese towns and townships:

== Jiangxi ==
- Gaocun, Wanzai (高村镇), a town of Wanzai County, Jiangxi, on List of township-level divisions of Jiangxi

== Henan ==
- Gaocun, Hebi (高村镇), a town of Qi County, Henan on List of township-level divisions of Henan
- Gaocun, Xingyang (高村乡), a township of Xingyang City (Chinese: 荥阳), Henan
- Gaocun, Xiuwu (高村乡), a township of Xiuwu County (Chinese: 修武), on List of township-level divisions of Henan
- Gaocun, Luoyang (高村乡), a township of Yiyang County (Chinese: 宜阳), Luoyang prefecture-level city, Henan, on List of township-level divisions of Henan

== Tianjin ==
- Gaocun, Wuqing (高村镇)
