= Tuojiang, Fenghuang =

Coordinates: 27.9543°N 109.5884°E

Tuojiang Town
- Town

Chinese transcription(s)
  - Simplified: 沱江镇
  - Traditional: 沱江鎮
  - Pinyin: Tuójiāng Zhèn
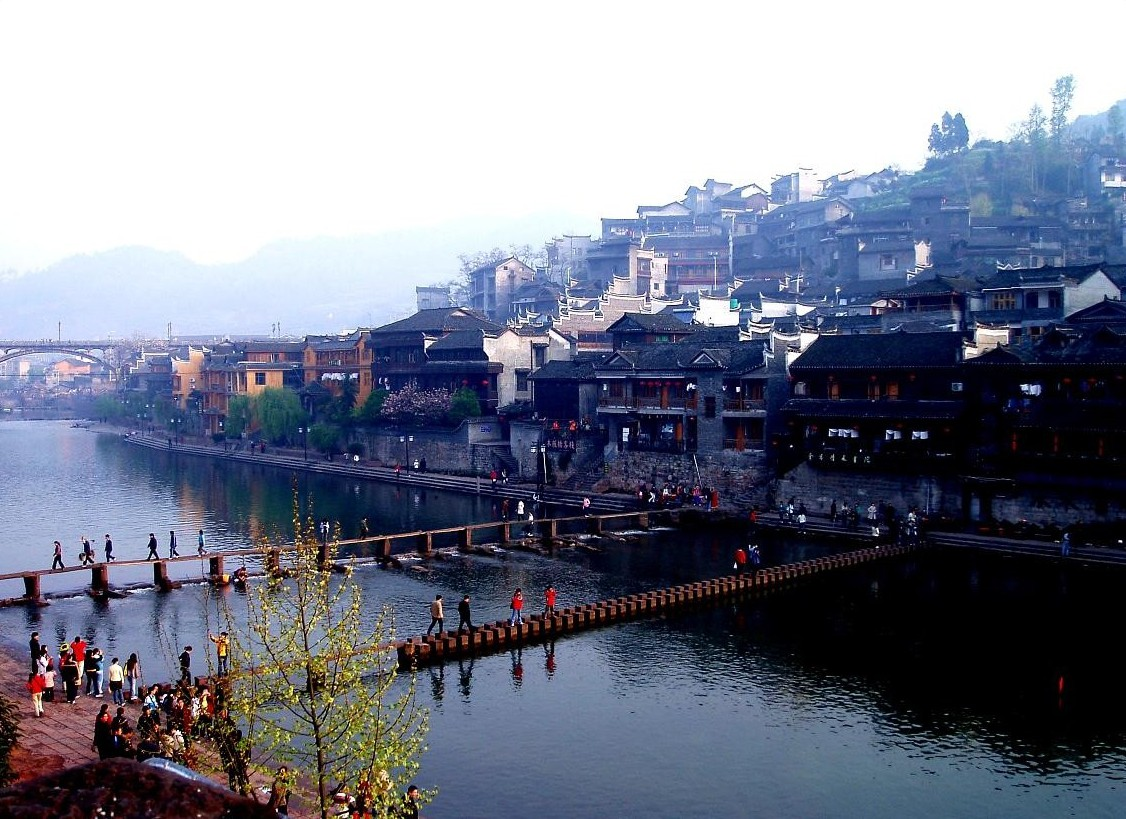
- Interactive map of Tuojiang Town
- Country: China
- Province: Hunan
- Prefecture: Xiangxi Tujia and Miao Autonomous Prefecture
- County: Fenghuang

Area
  - Total: 116.7 km^{2} (45.1 sq mi)

Population
  - Total: 78,000
  - Density: 670/km^{2} (1,700/sq mi)
- Time zone: UTC+8 (China Standard)
- Postal code: 416299
- Area code: 0743

Tuojiang Town (Chinese: 沱江镇; pinyin: Tuójiāng Zhèn) is an ancient town and the seat of Fenghuang County in Hunan, China. It has an area of 191.7 km^{2} (74.0 sq mi) with a population of 112,200 (as of 2015). The town has 29 villages and 7 communities under its jurisdiction, its seat is at Fenghuang South Road (Chinese: 凤凰南路). The town is famous for Ancient City of Fenghuang, it is one of the most important tourist destinations in Hunan and one of AAAA-rated tourist attractions.

== History ==
The town of Tuojiang is an ancient town. it was City of Wuzhaisi (Chinese: 五寨司城) which was the seat of Wuzhai Tusi (Chinese: 五寨司) formed in Yuan dynasty. Camp Fenghuang (Chinese: 凤凰营) was established there in 1704 and Camp Fenghuang was upgraded to Military Department of Fenghuang (Chinese: 凤凰厅) in 1736, it became the seat of Fenghuang Military Department. Military Department of Fenghuang ceased to be a military unit, the county of Fenghuang was formed in 1912, it is the seat of the county. In 1942, the town of Zhengan (Chinese: 镇竿镇) was renamed as Tuojiang after the Tuojiang River which runs through it.

In 2005, the township of Qiliangqiao (Chinese: 齐良桥乡) was amalgamated to the town, it had an area of 116.7 km^{2} (45.1 sq mi) with 6 communities and 24 villages (as of 2011). On November 30, 2015, the township of Guanzhuang (Chinese: 官庄乡) was merged to the town, it has an area of 191.7 km^{2} (74.0 sq mi) with 7 communities and 34 villages (as of 2015).

=== Amalgamation of villages in 2016 ===
Amalgamation of villages in 2016
| villages | | former villages | |
| English | Chinese | English | Chinese |
| Changping Village | 长坪村 | Changping Village | 长坪村 |
| Changping Village | 长坪村 | Shanmu Village | 杉木坪村 |
| Chengbei Community | 城北社区 | Chengbei Community | 城北社区 |
| Chengbei Community | 城北社区 | Guanyanwu Village | 关岩屋村 |
| Chengbei Community | 城北社区 | Wangjiazhai Village | 王家寨村 |
| Dutian Village | 杜田村 | Dutian Village | 杜田村 |
| Dutian Village | 杜田村 | Gaofeng Village | 高峰村 |
| Xikou Village | 溪口村 | Xikou Village | 溪口村 |
| Xikou Village | 溪口村 | Maobianchong Village | 毛边冲村 |

== Geography ==
The town of Tuojiang is located in the east of Fenghuang County, it is bordered by the township of Dashuitian to the south, by the towns of Liaojiaqiao and Qiangongping to the west, by the towns of Jinxin and Mujiangping to the north, by the townships of Shiyangzui and Banlishu of Mayang County to the east.

== Subdivisions ==
The township of Guanzhuang (Chinese: 官庄乡) was merged to the town, it had 7 communities and 34 villages under its jurisdiction in 2015. Through the amalgamation of village-level divisions in 2016, its villages were reduced to 29 from 34. The town of Tuojiang has 29 villages and 7 communities under its jurisdiction.

7 communities

- Chengbei Community (Chinese: 城北社区)
- Gucheng Community (Chinese: 古城社区)
- Hongqi Community (Chinese: 红旗社区)
- Nanhua Community (Chinese: 南华社区)
- Sanwangge Community (Chinese: 三王阁社区)
- Shawan Community (Chinese: 沙湾社区)
- Xintianlong Community (Chinese: 新田垅社区)

29 villages

- Baiyan Village (Chinese: 白岩村)
- Bisheng Village (Chinese: 必胜村)
- Changping Village (Chinese: 长坪村)
- Da'ao Village (Chinese: 大坳村)
- Dahuangtu Village (Chinese: 大黄土村)
- Dawan Village (Chinese: 大湾村)
- Dazhong Village (Chinese: 大众村)
- Dongfanghong Village (Chinese: 东方红村)
- Dutian Village (Chinese: 杜田村)
- Duye Village (Chinese: 杜夜村)
- Guangzhuang Village (Chinese: 官庄村)
- Hongqiao Village (Chinese: 虹桥村)
- Huangli Village (Chinese: 黄栗村)
- Jinping Village (Chinese: 金坪村)
- Longtan Village (Chinese: 龙潭村)
- Mianzhai Village (Chinese: 棉寨村)
- Mulinqiao Village (Chinese: 木林桥村)
- Pingli Village (Chinese: 坪里村)
- Qiliangqiao Village (Chinese: 齐良桥村)
- Qingwa Village (Chinese: 青瓦村)
- Sanliwan Village (Chinese: 三里湾村)
- Shilipai Village (Chinese: 十里牌村)
- Shucai Village (Chinese: 蔬菜村)
- Tuqiao Village (Chinese: 土桥村)
- Wanzhao Village (Chinese: 万召村)
- Xiaohuangtu Village (Chinese: 小黄土村)
- Xikou Village (Chinese: 溪口村)
- Xinmin Village (Chinese: 新民村)
- Zhuangshang Village (Chinese: 庄上村)

== Attractions ==
The town of Tuojiang is one of national famous historical and cultural cities in China, the Miaojiang Great Wall, hanging houses, ancient architectural complex and two national historical and cultural sites of Old Fortress of Fenghuang (Chinese: 凤凰古城堡) and Shen Congwen's Former Residence (Chinese: 沈从文故居) are important tourist attractions.
