= Yuan River (disambiguation) =

Yuan River (沅江, Yuanjiang) usually refers to a tributary of the Yangtze in Hunan, China.

It may also refer to:

- Yuan River (冤水, Yuānshuǐ), a former name of the former Ji River in Shandong, China
- Yuan River (元江, Yuánjiāng), the Chinese name for the upper course of the Red River in Yunnan, China

== See also ==
- Yuan Jiang (disambiguation)
