= Tuojiang (disambiguation) =

Tuojiang or Tuo River, one of the major tributaries of the upper Yangtze River.

Tuojiang may refer to the following Chinese places:

- Tuojiang, Fenghuang (Chinese: 沱江镇), a town and the seat of Fenghuang County in Hunan
- Tuojiang, Jianghua (Chinese: 沱江镇), a town and the seat of Jianghua Yao Autonomous County in Hunan
