= Godfrey Holbein =

Catholic missionary killed in China

The Reverend Father Godfrey Holbein, C.P.
- Title: Missionary Priest

Personal life
- Born: Claude Holbein; February 4, 1899 Baltimore, Maryland, U.S.
- Died: April 24, 1929 (aged 30) Near Hua Chiao, Hunan Province, China
- Cause of death: Executed by bandits during the Chinese Civil War
- Education: St. Joseph's Monastery School, St. Mary's Preparatory Seminary
- Occupation: Missionary, Priest

Religious life
- Denomination: Roman Catholic
- Institute: St. Paul of the Cross Province

Senior posting
- Based in: Hunan, China
- Other: Priest

Godfrey Holbein, C.P. (born Claude Holbein; February 4, 1899 – April 24, 1929) was an American Passionist priest and missionary who was killed in Hunan Province, China, during the political volatility of the Republican era. Holbein, along with fellow Passionist priests Clement Seybold and Walter Coveyou, were among the first American Catholic missionaries killed on foreign mission soil.

== Early life and education ==
Claude Holbein was born in Baltimore, Maryland, on February 4, 1899, to Frank L. Holbein and Mary E. Kelly. Raised in a Catholic family in the Irvington neighborhood of Baltimore, his early years were marked by the early death of his father. He attended St. Joseph’s Monastery School, graduating in 1911, before entering St. Mary’s Passionist Preparatory Seminary in Dunkirk, New York.

In 1916, he entered the Novitiate of the Congregation of the Passion in Pittsburgh, Pennsylvania, formally professing his vows on May 16, 1917, and taking the religious name Godfrey of Jesus. He completed his philosophical and theological studies across several Passionist monasteries in the American Northeast, including locations in Scranton, Pennsylvania, and West Hoboken, New Jersey. Prior to his overseas assignment, he also received basic medical and dental training to assist in rural mission outreach. He was ordained to the priesthood by Bishop Hugh C. Boyle in Pittsburgh on October 28, 1923.

== Mission to China (1924–1929) ==
On July 22, 1924, Father Holbein departed from San Francisco aboard the President Wilson as part of a group of American Passionist missionaries bound for Western Hunan. Arriving in Shanghai, he traveled up the Yangtze River into the interior to reach the central Passionist mission station at Shenchowfu (modern-day Yuanling).

Holbein's years in China coincided with the height of the Warlord Era, the Northern Expedition, and early clashes of the Chinese Civil War. Mission outposts in Western Hunan were frequently isolated; during one incident in 1925, a mission station where Holbein was stationed was besieged by armed regional forces before the missionaries managed an escape.

By 1927, escalating political violence forced many foreign missionaries into temporary exile in China's coastal cities. Upon returning to Hunan in 1928, Holbein assisted in maintaining mission properties in Supu and helping coordinate famine relief and medical care for local communities.

== Passionist companions ==
Father Holbein's mission work and death were shared by two fellow Passionist priests:

- Father Clement Seybold, C.P. (born Lawrence Seybold; April 18, 1896, in Dunkirk, New York), who entered the Passionist order taking the religious name Clement of Saint Michael and was ordained in 1923.
- Father Walter Coveyou, C.P. (born October 17, 1894, in Petoskey, Michigan), who professed vows in 1912 and was ordained for the Holy Cross Province on May 29, 1920.

== Ambush and Death ==
In April 1929, Fathers Holbein, Seybold, and Coveyou completed an annual spiritual retreat in Shenchowfu and set out toward a mission outpost in Chenki, accompanied by a local youth. On April 24, 1929, the party was ambushed on a mountain trail near the village of Hua Chiao by active regional bandits.

The three priests were captured and executed. Eyewitness reports indicated that Holbein offered a final blessing to his companions before his death. On April 27, local Christians and Passionist confreres recovered their bodies from an abandoned copper pit, and the three priests were interred together in Shenchowfu.

== Legacy and funeral ==
News of the executions received widespread reporting across American newspapers and Catholic media, including front-page coverage in The Baltimore Sun. A solemn memorial service was held at Mount St. Joseph in Baltimore, attended by local clergy, family, and civic leaders.

While Holbein has not been formally canonized, he and his companions are commemorated within the Passionist order as martyrs for their missionary service in early 20th-century China. His personal papers and primary correspondence are preserved in the John J. Burns Library at Boston College.
