= Fenghuang County =

Fenghuang County 凤凰县 Fenghwang
- County
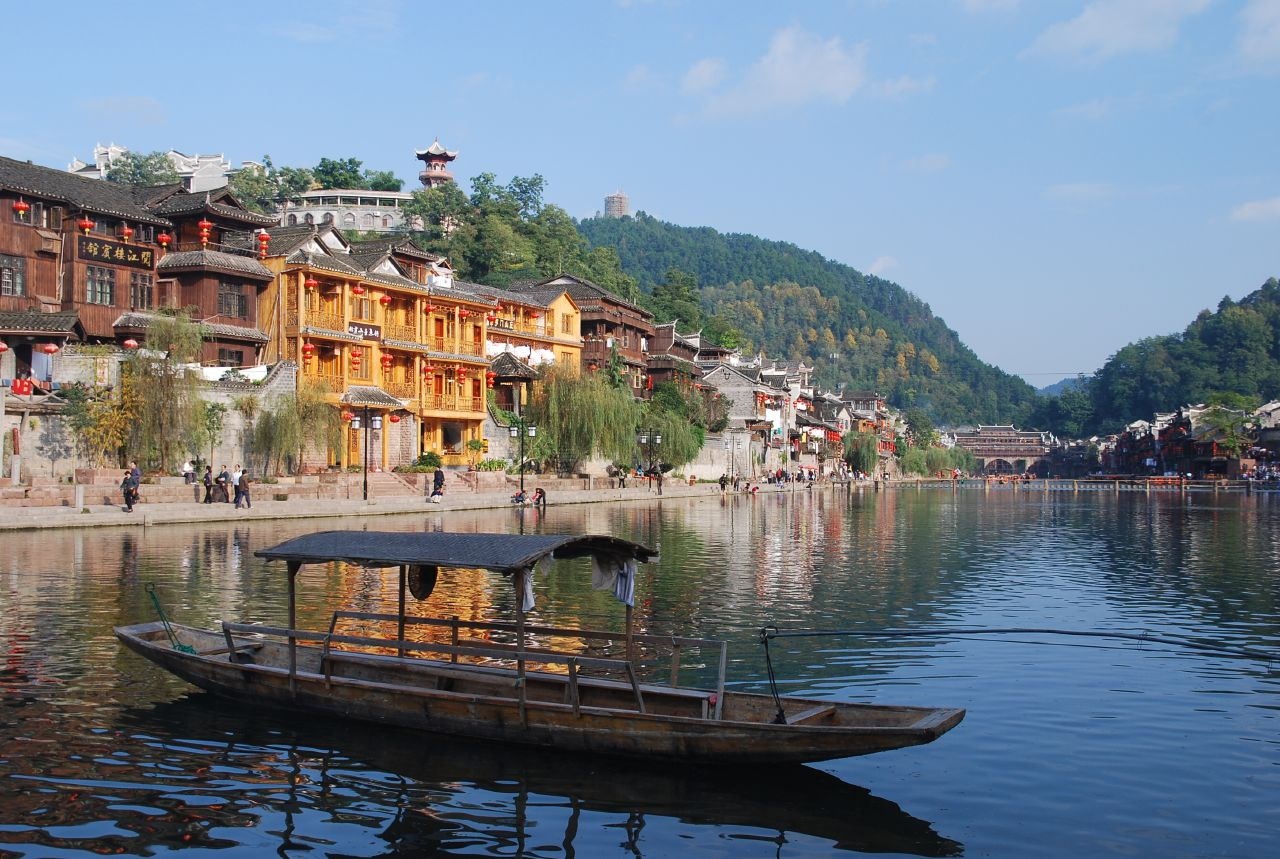
- Fenghuang Ancient Town

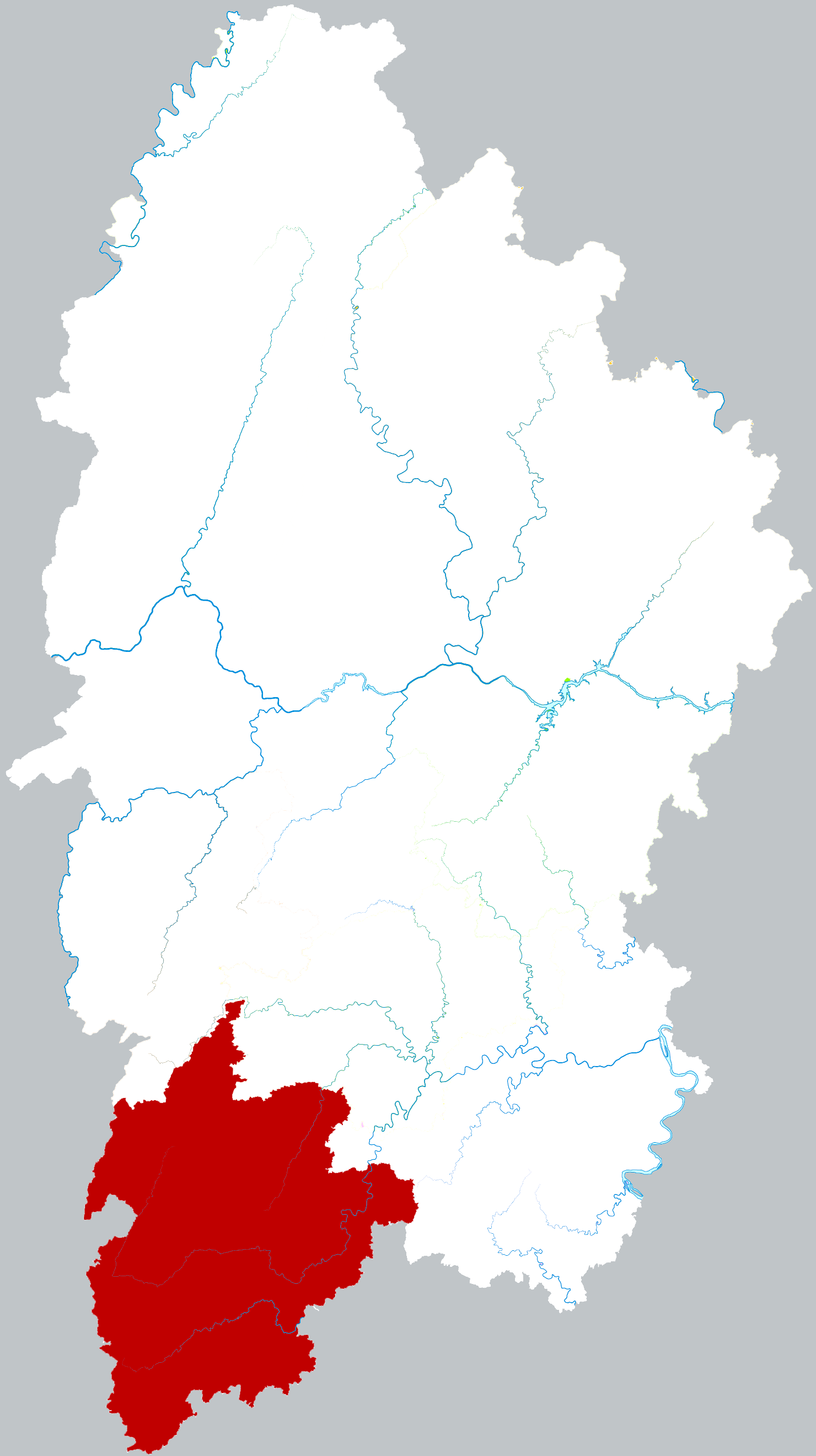
- Location of Fenghuang County within Xiangxi

- Location in Hunan
- Coordinates: 27°56′56″N 109°36′14″E
- Country: People's Republic of China
- Province: Hunan
- Autonomous prefecture: Xiangxi

Area
  - Total: 1,751.10 km^{2} (676.10 sq mi)

Population (2010)
  - Total: 350,195
  - Density: 199.986/km^{2} (517.961/sq mi)
- Time zone: UTC+8 (China Standard)
- Postal code: 4162XX

Fenghuang County (simplified Chinese: 凤凰县; traditional Chinese: 鳳凰縣; pinyin: Fènghuáng Xiàn), named after the mythological birds Fenghuang, is a county of Hunan Province, China, under the administration of Xiangxi Autonomous Prefecture.

Located on the western margin of the province and the southern Xiangxi, it is immediately adjacent to the eastern edge of Guizhou Province. The county is bordered to the north by Huayuan County and Jishou City, to the east by Luxi County, to the southeast by Mayang County, and to the southwest and the west by Bijiang District of Tongren City and Songtao County of Guizhou. Fenghuang County covers an area of 1,745 km^{2} (674 sq mi), and as of 2015, it had a registered population of 428,294 and a resident population of 363,700. The county has 13 towns and four townships under its jurisdiction, and the county seat is Tuojiang (沱江镇).

== History ==
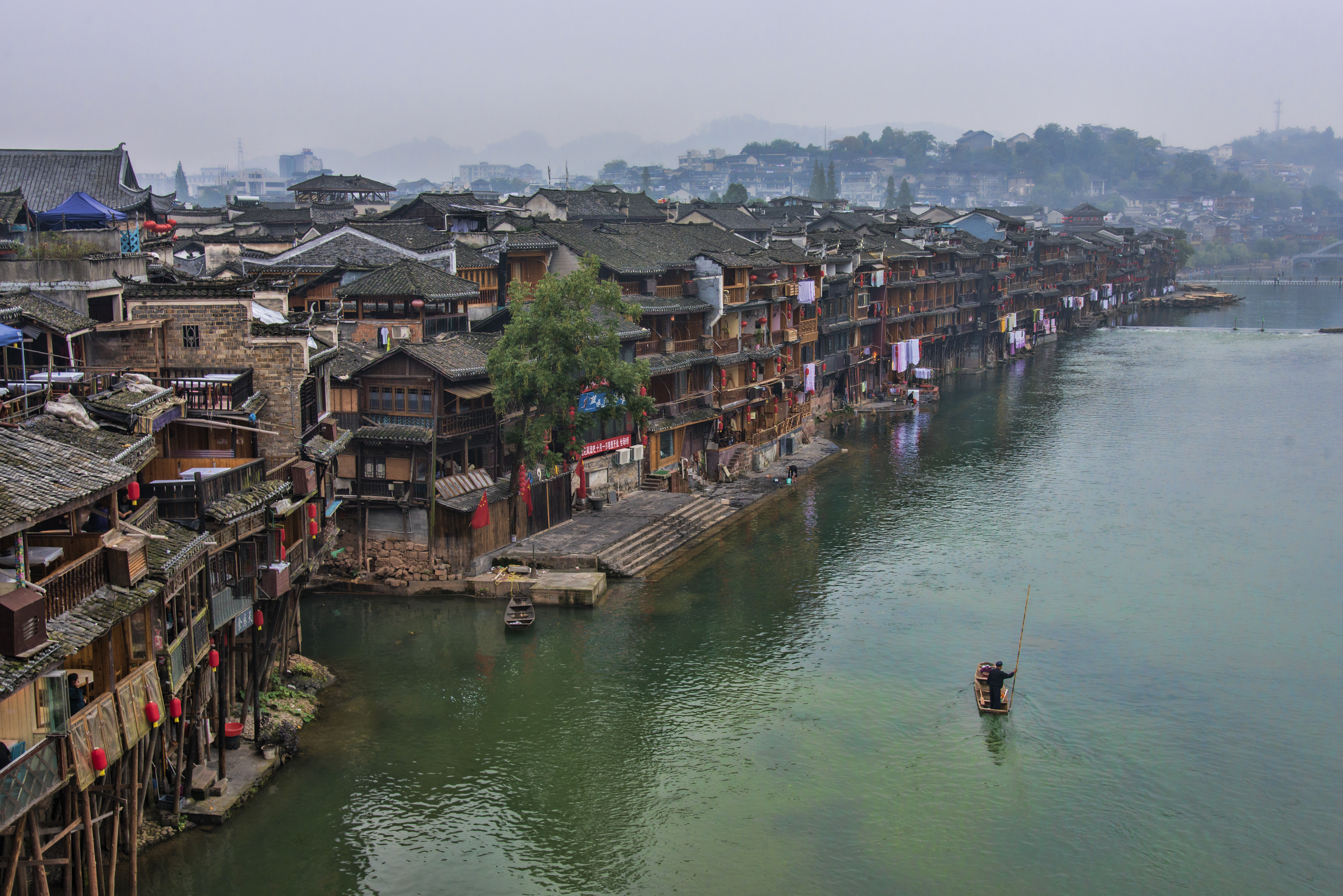
View of Fenghuang Ancient Town from the Red Bridge

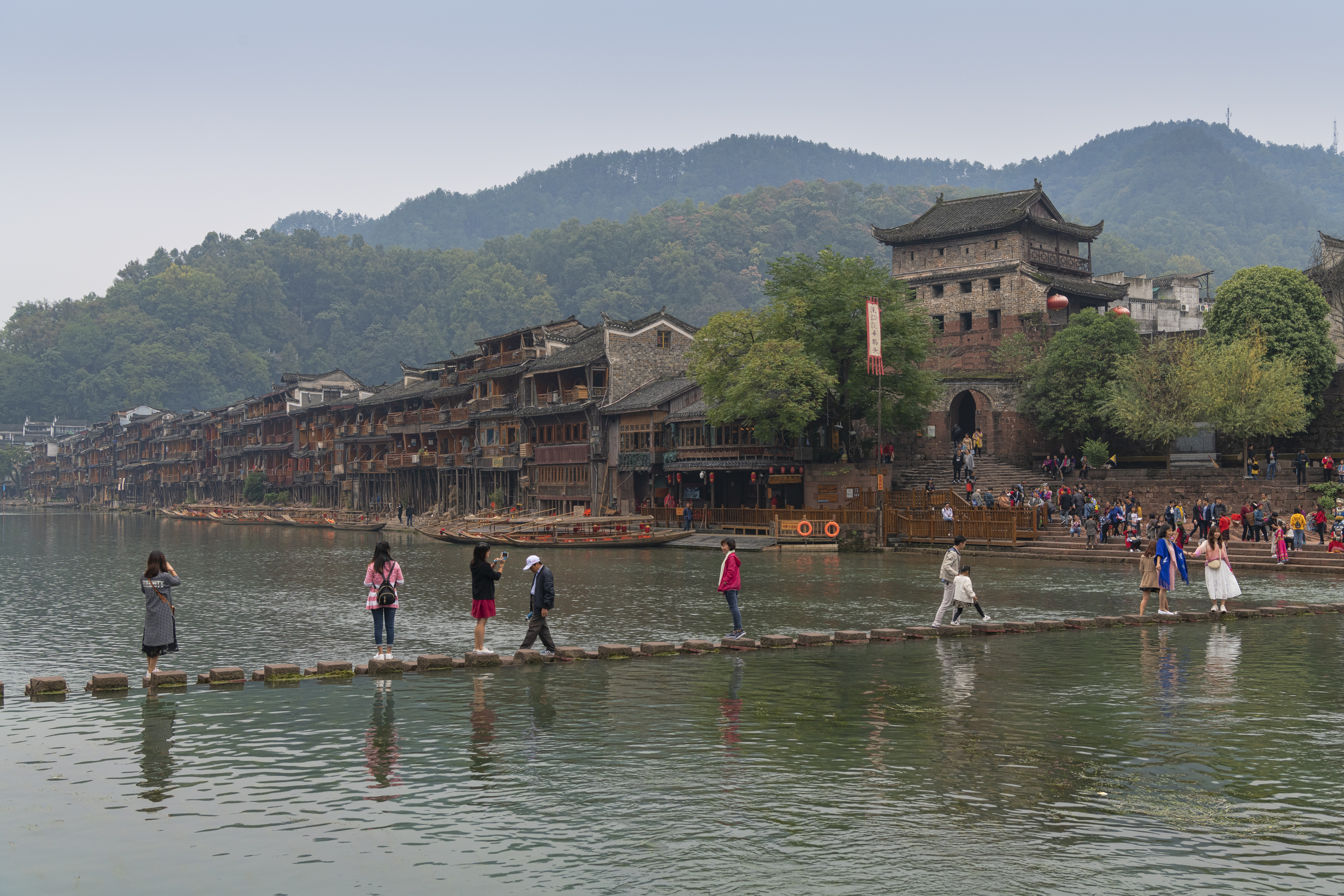
River crossing in Fenghuang Ancient Town

Fenghuang County has an exceptionally well-preserved ancient town that harbours unique ethnic languages, customs, arts as well as many distinctive architectural remains of Ming and Qing styles. The town is placed in a mountain setting, incorporating the natural flow of the river Tuojiang into the city layout. Over half of the city's population belong to the Miao or Tujia minorities. It was the centre of the unsuccessful Miao Rebellion of 1854-73, which created a Miao diaspora in Southeast Asia during the last two centuries. The city is revered in Miao traditions and funeral rites and is the location of the Southern China Great Wall (中国南方长城; 中國南方長城; Zhōngguó Nánfāng Chángchéng; Miao: "Suav Tuam Choj"), a fortification built by the Ming dynasty to protect the local Han Chinese from Miao attacks.

After 1913, the name of the town changed from Zhen'gan (鎮筸) to Fenghuang.

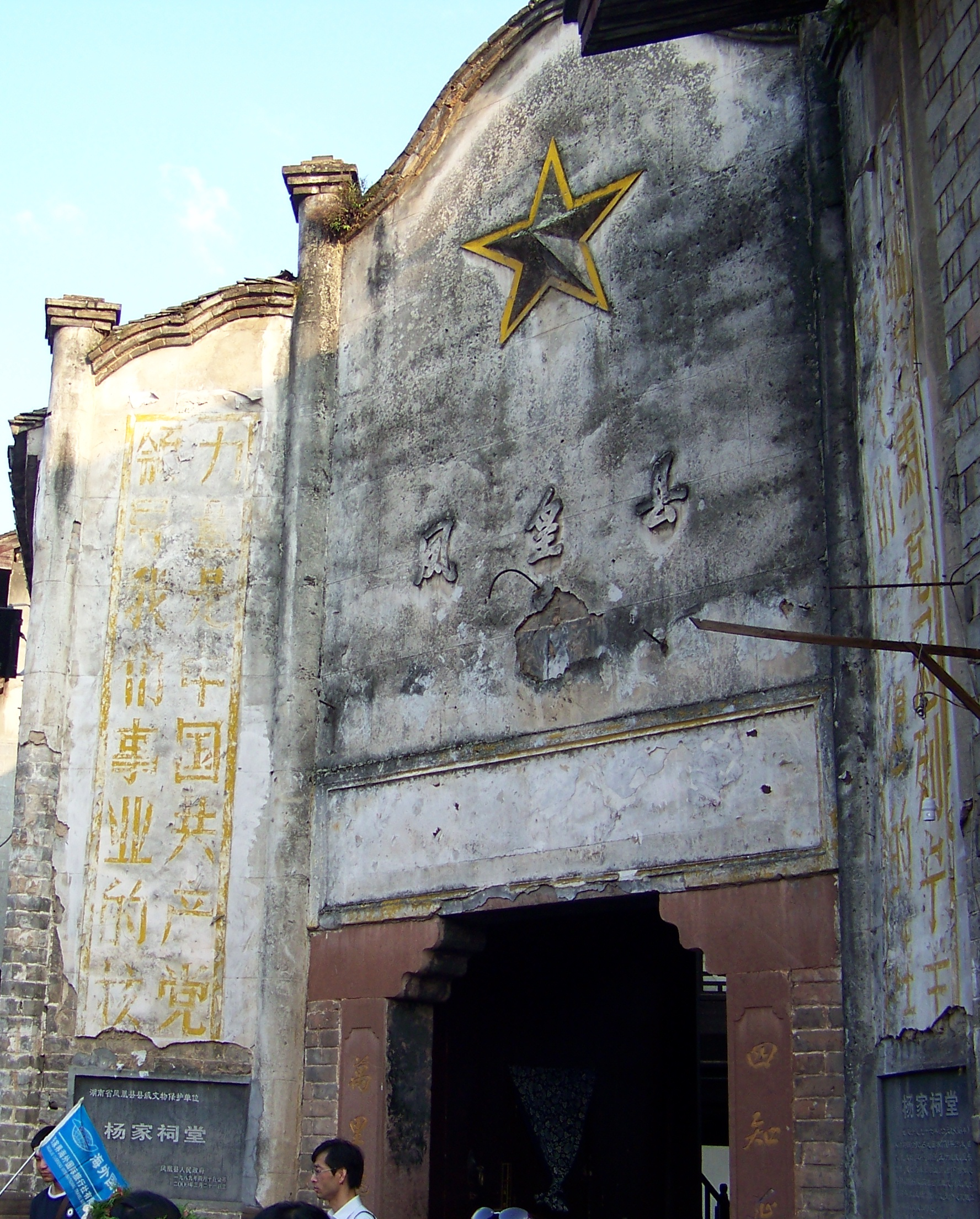
The gate to the government offices built in the 1920s. The writing on top of the gate reads "Fenghuang County"

The ancient town of Fenghuang was added to the UNESCO World Heritage Tentative List on March 28, 2008, in the Cultural category. This ancient town was regarded as the most beautiful town in China by New Zealand writer Rewi Alley. It was built in 1704, and has 300 years of history. The ancient city is a gathering place for Miao and Tujia ethnic minorities.

The town was damaged by flooding in July 2014.

== Notable people ==
- Shen Congwen – modern author and researcher of Chinese material arts. His childhood home is a popular tourist attraction in Fenghuang town
- Huang Yongyu – painter

== Transportation ==
The nearest airport Fenghuang Airport in Tongren City is only 34 km (21 mi) away from Fenghuang County and the nearest train station in Jishou City is only 50 km (31 mi) away. After arriving at Fenghuang Airport or Jishou Train Station, tourists may take a bus or taxi to Fenghuang County. Zhangjiajie Airport and Huaihua Train Station are also often used as transfer stops for Fenghuang County.

The Fenghuang Maglev opened in 2022, connecting the Fenghuang railway station on Zhangjiajie–Jishou–Huaihua high-speed railway with the Fenghuang Folklore Garden.

== Climate ==
Climate data for Fenghuang, elevation 350 m (1,150 ft), (1991–2020 normals, extremes 1981–present)
Month	Jan	Feb	Mar	Apr	May	Jun	Jul	Aug	Sep	Oct	Nov	Dec	Year
Record high °C (°F)	25.1 (77.2)	29.3 (84.7)	34.2 (93.6)	34.5 (94.1)	35.5 (95.9)	36.7 (98.1)	38.5 (101.3)	38.6 (101.5)	39.0 (102.2)	35.8 (96.4)	31.0 (87.8)	22.8 (73.0)	39.0 (102.2)
Mean daily maximum °C (°F)	8.3 (46.9)	11.0 (51.8)	15.6 (60.1)	21.7 (71.1)	25.9 (78.6)	28.9 (84.0)	32.1 (89.8)	32.2 (90.0)	28.2 (82.8)	22.1 (71.8)	16.8 (62.2)	11.0 (51.8)	21.2 (70.1)
Daily mean °C (°F)	4.8 (40.6)	7.0 (44.6)	11.0 (51.8)	16.6 (61.9)	20.8 (69.4)	24.3 (75.7)	27.1 (80.8)	26.7 (80.1)	22.8 (73.0)	17.3 (63.1)	12.1 (53.8)	7.0 (44.6)	16.5 (61.6)
Mean daily minimum °C (°F)	2.5 (36.5)	4.4 (39.9)	8.0 (46.4)	13.1 (55.6)	17.4 (63.3)	21.1 (70.0)	23.5 (74.3)	23.1 (73.6)	19.4 (66.9)	14.4 (57.9)	9.3 (48.7)	4.4 (39.9)	13.4 (56.1)
Record low °C (°F)	−6.0 (21.2)	−4.6 (23.7)	−0.9 (30.4)	3.1 (37.6)	7.2 (45.0)	13.0 (55.4)	16.5 (61.7)	15.9 (60.6)	11.7 (53.1)	3.5 (38.3)	−1.9 (28.6)	−4.5 (23.9)	−6.0 (21.2)
Average precipitation mm (inches)	51.6 (2.03)	55.9 (2.20)	85.9 (3.38)	126.0 (4.96)	195.5 (7.70)	241.1 (9.49)	202.2 (7.96)	123.0 (4.84)	81.8 (3.22)	93.8 (3.69)	63.9 (2.52)	37.1 (1.46)	1,357.8 (53.45)
Average precipitation days (≥ 0.1 mm)	13.3	13.2	16.6	17.1	16.7	16.0	12.4	10.9	9.3	12.7	10.5	10.8	159.5
Average snowy days	6.1	3.6	0.8	0.1	0	0	0	0	0	0	0.1	2.0	12.7
Average relative humidity (%)	79	79	80	81	83	85	81	79	79	81	80	76	80
Mean monthly sunshine hours	45.9	50.0	66.8	93.7	111.5	108.3	186.5	189.6	134.8	101.0	87.8	70.7	1,246.6
Percentage possible sunshine	14	16	18	24	27	26	44	47	37	29	27	22	28
Source: China Meteorological Administrationall-time April high
