= Gaocun =

Town and the county seat of Mayang Miao Autonomous County in Hunan, China

Coordinates: 27°51′40″N 109°48′3″E

Gaocun 高村镇
- Town
- Interactive map of Gaocun
- Country: China
- Province: Hunan
- Autonomous county: Mayang
- Subdivisions: 18: 8 residential communities 10 administrative villages

Gaocun Town (Chinese: 高村镇; pinyin: Gāocūn Zhèn) is a town and the county seat of Mayang Miao Autonomous County in Hunan, China. The town is located in the mid-northern region of the county, it was reformed to merge Luxikou Township (Chinese: 绿溪口乡), Liping Township (Chinese: 栗坪乡), Gudapo Township (Chinese: 谷达坡乡) and the former Gaocun Town on November 25, 2015, it has an area of 187.6 km^{2} (72.4 sq mi) with a population of 104,300 (as of 2015 end). The town was divided into 37 villages and communities in May 2016, the seat of local government is at Gaocun.(Chinese: 高村).
