= Miaojiang Great Wall =

Series of fortifications in Southern China

Coordinates: 27.9333°N 109.4634418°E

The Miaojiang Great Wall (Chinese: 苗疆长城; pinyin: Miáojiāng Chángchéng or Southern Great Wall, Chinese: 南方长城; pinyin: Nánfāng Chángchéng) is a series of fortifications in Southern China. It is located in the present-day Xiangxi Autonomous Region of Tujia and Miao in the western province of Hunan, China. It is a 190-kilometre (120-mile) wall, the largest part of which is in Fenghuang County. It was built in 1554 during the Ming Dynasty to protect against the minorities in Southern China and was completed in 1662. The wall is 3 metres (9 feet 10 inches) high and 2 metres (6 feet 7 inches) wide.

== "Discovery" of the Great Wall ==
In late April 2000, in order to prepare to declare Fenghuang as a national historical and cultural city, the Fenghuang County Party Committee and the County Government specially invited Zhao Jinghui, an expert on ancient architecture from the Ministry of Construction of the People’s Republic of China, Luo Jinghui, an expert on ancient architecture from the State Administration of Cultural Heritage, and vice president of the Great Wall Society. More than 10 people including Zhewen came to the ancient city of Fenghuang for a comprehensive investigation. When the local entourage introduced the "Miao Border Wall", Luo Zhewen, who had searched the Great Wall in the South for 50 years, was very interested in it and climbed up the wall to conduct a detailed investigation. At the end of April, experts concluded that the side wall was the Great Wall of the South.

The Miaojiang Great Wall is roughly located in Fenghuang County, with a total length of 190 kilometers. It starts from Xiqueying (Chinese: 喜鹊营) (one said Danwuying) in Guzhang County of Xiangxi in the north to Tingziguan (Chinese: 亭子关) in Tongren, Guizhou in the south. It is mostly built on steep ridges. Different from the Great Wall in the North, the defense purpose of the Great Wall of Miao is not to resist the invasion of nomads, but to isolate Miao who do not obey the court and the Miao who obey the court to prevent riots. The Great Wall was built during the Wanli period of the Ming Dynasty (1573–1620) and was built by the Ming court with a grant of 40,000 taels of silver.

At the end of the Ming Dynasty, the Miao people rioted and razed the side walls to the ground. The Qing government rebuilt a new city wall on the site of the side wall to continue to prevent the Miao people from rioting.

== Scale and border defense ==
There are more than 1,300 South Great Walls used for military and defense purposes, including Xunbao, Diaolou, Tunka, Outposts, Fortresses, and Pass Gates. There are more than 800 in Fenghuang County alone. At that time, the garrison was about 4,000–5,000, and at most it had increased to about 7,000. The city wall is about 3 meters high, the bottom is 2 meters wide, and the top of the wall is 1 meter wide. For this reason, local place names are mostly named after forts, outposts, cards, forts, bunkers, gates, and camps.

The Southern Great Wall is generally smaller than the Great Wall in the North, and the stones are only one-sixth to one-tenth the size of the Great Wall in the North. The reason for this could be that the military strength of the Miao is not strong, and it does not need to be built as strong as the Great Wall in the North. Because stones are often demolished by nearby living people to build houses, today's Miaojiang Great Wall is already intermittent, and some well-preserved castles are the most distinctive. According to Yang Zhiyong, a cadre of the Propaganda Department of the Fenghuang County Party Committee, when he was a child, there was a side wall in Liaojiaqiao Town, and there were three gates to the east, west and south. In the construction of houses, reservoirs and channels, the materials were taken on the spot, and by the 1980s they had been demolished. The protection situation in other places is the same, so the South Great Wall is mostly incomplete.

According to Professor Luo Zhewen, the Ming Great Wall in the north is also called a side wall. The side walls of each military defense zone have lengths and shorts. The "Changzhen" that defended the Ming Tombs in Beijing was more than 200 kilometers long, which was about the same length as the side wall of "Zhengan" town in Hunan (now Fenghuang County). The Great Wall in Western Hunan not only has the same defense system as the Ming Great Wall in the North, but also has the same military structure and system of officers and soldiers. Therefore, the Great Wall is completely part of the Great Wall of China.

== Repair and publicity ==
After the conclusion of the South Great Wall, the Fenghuang County Government and the County Party Committee carried out a series of restoration and publicity activities. The government funded rescue and repair work in the Lahaoyingpan section of Yongxing Ping. A total of 1.78 kilometers was repaired before May 2001.

In order to achieve the purpose of propaganda, the "South Great Wall 2003 China–Korea Go Invitational Tournament" was held in Fenghuang County. Related units spent nearly 200,000 yuan to build the world’s largest go board on the South Great Wall, which is 5051.83 times the standard chess board, with a side length of 31.7 meters and a total area of 1004.89 square meters. Go players such as Chang Hao and Cao Xunxuan came to play go, and nearly a thousand spectators watched it live, and it was broadcast live on TV by hundreds of media. In order to show respect, some amateurs spent over a month walking here.

== See also ==
- Great Wall of China
