= Liping Township, Hunan =

Township in Mayang Miao Autonomous County, Hunan, China

Coordinates: 27.9016°N 109.8396°E

Liping Township (栗坪乡) is a township in Mayang Miao Autonomous County, Hunan, China.

== See also ==
- List of township-level divisions of Hunan
