= Yuan Jiang (disambiguation) =

Yuan Jiang (Chinese: 袁江, p Yuán Jiāng), formerly known as Yüan Chiang, was a Chinese painter.

Yuanjiang (沅江, p Yuánjiāng, lit. "Yuan River") is a city in Hunan on the Yuan River.

Yuan Jiang or Yuanjiang may also refer to:

- Yuanjiang River, another name of the Yuan River (also 沅江), a tributary of the Yangtze in Hunan, China
- Yuanjiang Hani, Yi and Dai Autonomous County (元江哈尼族彝族傣族自治县) in Yuxi, Yunnan, China
- Yuanjiang River, another name of the Yuan River (元江, Yuán Jiāng), the Chinese name for the Red River

== See also ==
- Yuan River (disambiguation)
