= Chenyang =

Town in Hunan, China

Coordinates: 28°00′24″N 110°11′02″E

Chenyang Town (Chinese: 辰阳镇; pinyin: Chényáng Zhèn) is a town and the county seat in the middle western Chenxi County, Hunan, China. The town was reformed through the amalgamation of Chengjiao Township (Chinese: 城郊乡) and the former Chenyang Town on November 19, 2015. It has an area of 111.28 km^{2} (42.97 sq mi) with a population of 78,400 (as of the end of 2015). Its seat of local government is at Sangmuqiao Community (Chinese: 桑木桥村区).
