= Yuanling Town =

Town in Hunan, China

Yuanling Town = 沅陵镇
- Town
- Location in Hunan Yuanling Town (China)
- Coordinates: 28°27′25″N 110°23′34″E
- Country: People's Republic of China
- Province: Hunan
- Prefecture-level city: Huaihua
- County: Yuanling County

Yuanling Town (Chinese: 沅陵镇; pinyin: Yuánlíng Zhèn) is a town and the county seat of Yuanling County in Hunan, China. The town is located in the middle region of the county. It was reformed to merge Taichang Township (Chinese: 太常乡), Shenxikou Township (Chinese: 深溪口乡) and the former Yuanling Town on November 26, 2015. It has an area of 549.46 km^{2} (212.15 sq mi) with a population of 177,000 (as of 2015 end). Its seat of local government is at Shenglimen Community.(Chinese: 胜利门社区)

== See also ==
- List of township-level divisions of Hunan
