= Guyang, Guzhang =

Town and county seat of Guzhang County in Hunan, China

Coordinates: 28°36′59″N 109°56′37″E

Guyang Town (Chinese: 古阳镇; pinyin: Gǔyáng Zhèn) is a town and the county seat of Guzhang County in Hunan, China. The town is located in the middle region of the county. It was reformed to merge Hepeng Township (Chinese: 河蓬乡), Shuangxi Township (Chinese: 双溪乡), Luoyixi Township (Chinese: 罗依溪镇) and the former Guyang Town on November 30, 2015. It has an area of 336.67 km^{2} (129.99 sq mi) with a population of 56,500 (as of 2015 end). Its seat of local government is at Xiaoguzhangping (Chinese: 小古丈坪) of Hongxin Community (Chinese: 红星社区).

== See also ==
- List of township-level divisions of Hunan
