= Lufeng, Xupu =

Town in Xupu County, Hunan, China

Coordinates: 27°54′41″N 110°35′22″E

Lufeng Town (Chinese: 卢峰镇; pinyin: Lúfēng Zhèn) is a town and the county seat of Xupu County in Hunan, China. The town is located in the middle region of the county. It was reformed to merge Zhongxia Township (Chinese: 仲夏乡) and the former Lufeng Town on November 19, 2015. It has an area of 186 km^{2} (72 sq mi) with a population of 160,500 (as of the end of 2015). Its seat of local government is at Shengli Community (Chinese: 胜利社区).
