= Xupu County =

Xupu County 溆浦县 Supu; Süpu
- County
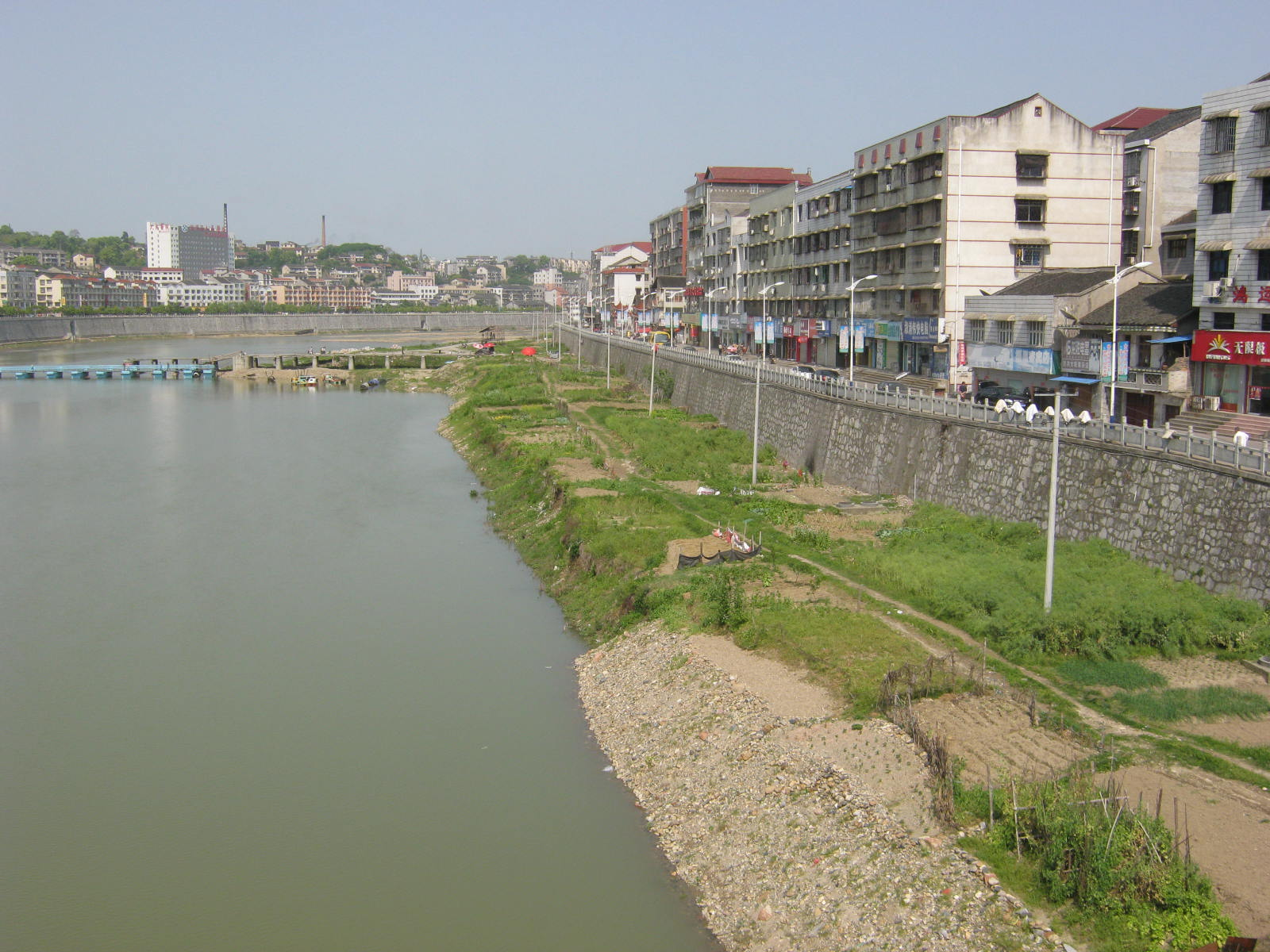

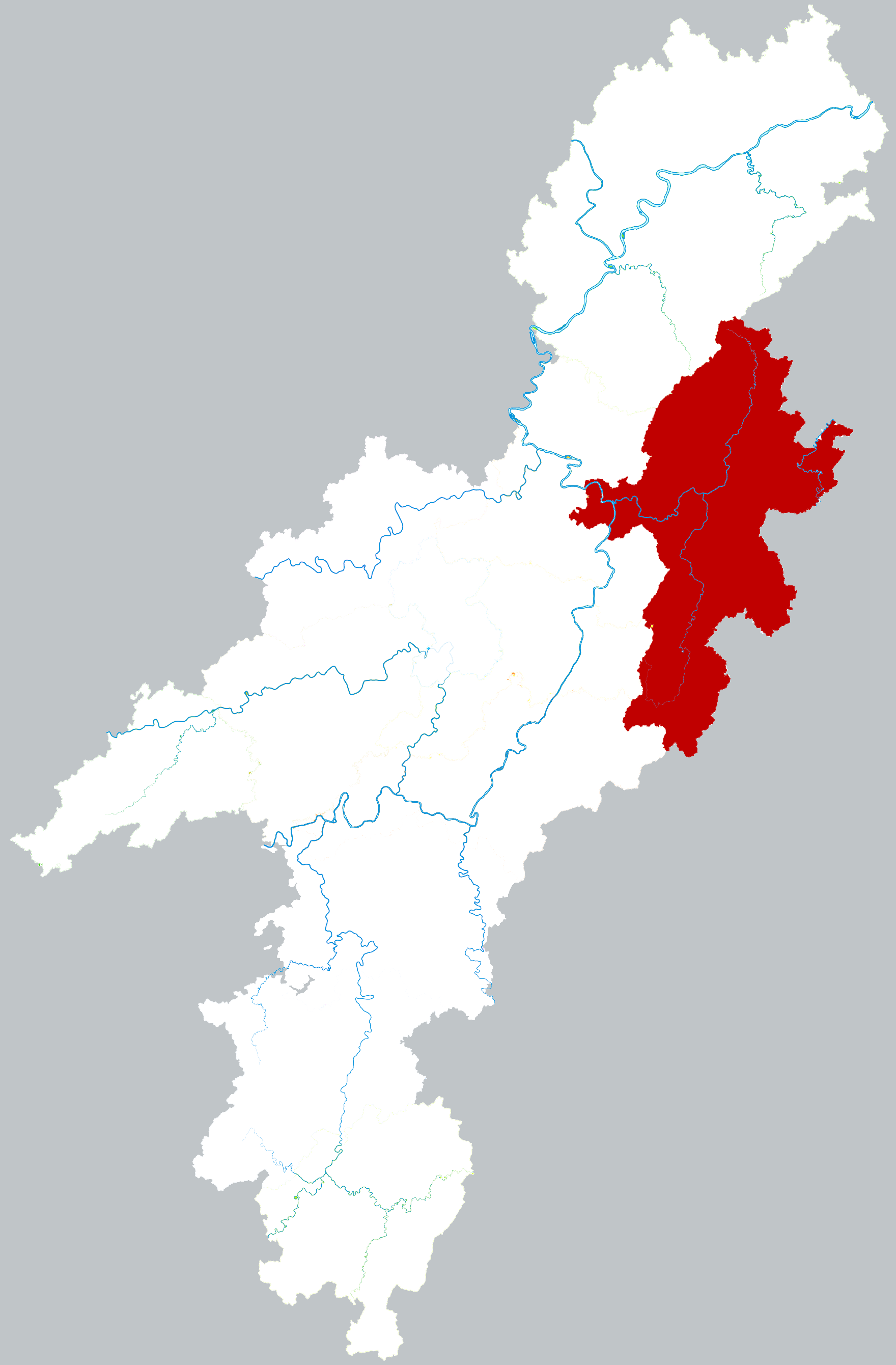
- Location of Xupu County within Huaihua

- Location in Hunan
- Coordinates: 27°54′40″N 110°35′38″E
- Country: People's Republic of China
- Province: Hunan
- Prefecture-level city: Huaihua

Area
  - Total: 3,437.93 km^{2} (1,327.39 sq mi)

Population (2010)
  - Total: 741,014
  - Density: 215.541/km^{2} (558.248/sq mi)
- Time zone: UTC+8 (China Standard)
- Postal code: 4193XX

Xupu County (simplified Chinese: 溆浦县; traditional Chinese: 溆浦縣; pinyin: Xùpǔ Xiàn) is a county of Hunan Province, China. It is under the administration of Huaihua Prefecture-level City.

Located on the west central Hunan, the county is bordered to the north by Yuanling County, to the northeast by Anhua County, to the east by Xinhua and Longhui Counties, to the south by Dongkou County, and to the west by Hongjiang City, Zhongfang and Chenxi Counties. Xupu County covers an area of 3,440.10 km^{2} (1,328.23 sq mi), and as of 2015, it had a registered population of 932,400 and a resident population of 752,400. Xupu County has 18 towns under its jurisdiction, and the government seat is the town of Lufeng (卢峰镇).

The Xu River (溆水) flows through the built-up area where it is joined by the Sandu River (三都河). Some kilometers downstream it joins the Yuan River.

== Yao people ==
According to the Xupu County Gazetteer (1993:641), the following three subgroups of Yao live in over 41 villages and number about 2,600 people.

- Flowery Yao 花瑶
- Flowery-Trouser Yao 花裤瑶
- Seven-Surname Yao 七姓瑶

== Climate ==
Climate data for Xupu, elevation 204 m (669 ft), (1991–2020 normals, extremes 1981–present)
Month	Jan	Feb	Mar	Apr	May	Jun	Jul	Aug	Sep	Oct	Nov	Dec	Year
Record high °C (°F)	24.7 (76.5)	29.5 (85.1)	34.5 (94.1)	35.8 (96.4)	36.5 (97.7)	37.9 (100.2)	39.2 (102.6)	39.4 (102.9)	39.9 (103.8)	37.9 (100.2)	31.5 (88.7)	23.5 (74.3)	39.9 (103.8)
Mean daily maximum °C (°F)	9.0 (48.2)	11.9 (53.4)	16.4 (61.5)	22.6 (72.7)	27.0 (80.6)	29.9 (85.8)	33.1 (91.6)	33.0 (91.4)	29.3 (84.7)	23.4 (74.1)	17.8 (64.0)	11.8 (53.2)	22.1 (71.8)
Daily mean °C (°F)	5.4 (41.7)	7.8 (46.0)	11.8 (53.2)	17.5 (63.5)	21.9 (71.4)	25.2 (77.4)	28.0 (82.4)	27.5 (81.5)	23.8 (74.8)	18.4 (65.1)	13.0 (55.4)	7.7 (45.9)	17.3 (63.2)
Mean daily minimum °C (°F)	2.9 (37.2)	4.9 (40.8)	8.5 (47.3)	13.8 (56.8)	18.1 (64.6)	21.9 (71.4)	24.2 (75.6)	23.6 (74.5)	19.9 (67.8)	14.8 (58.6)	9.6 (49.3)	4.6 (40.3)	13.9 (57.0)
Record low °C (°F)	−4.3 (24.3)	−3.4 (25.9)	−1.0 (30.2)	3.2 (37.8)	8.8 (47.8)	12.8 (55.0)	17.2 (63.0)	16.6 (61.9)	12.0 (53.6)	4.3 (39.7)	−0.6 (30.9)	−5.2 (22.6)	−5.2 (22.6)
Average precipitation mm (inches)	61.9 (2.44)	66.4 (2.61)	120.4 (4.74)	159.9 (6.30)	221.5 (8.72)	268.6 (10.57)	206.2 (8.12)	103.5 (4.07)	72.1 (2.84)	83.9 (3.30)	73.8 (2.91)	41.8 (1.65)	1,480 (58.27)
Average precipitation days (≥ 0.1 mm)	13.5	13.0	17.0	16.6	15.8	15.3	12.3	9.9	8.0	10.8	9.7	10.4	152.3
Average snowy days	4.8	2.9	0.8	0	0	0	0	0	0	0	0.1	1.6	10.2
Average relative humidity (%)	77	77	79	79	80	83	79	77	75	76	76	74	78
Mean monthly sunshine hours	51.0	55.5	73.1	101.6	120.6	120.3	192.9	194.7	145.2	110.1	95.5	75.0	1,335.5
Percentage possible sunshine	16	18	20	26	29	29	46	48	40	31	30	23	30
Source: China Meteorological Administration All-time Oct extreme
