= Mayang Miao Autonomous County =

Mayang County 麻阳县
- Autonomous county
- 麻阳苗族自治县; Mayang Miao Autonomous County
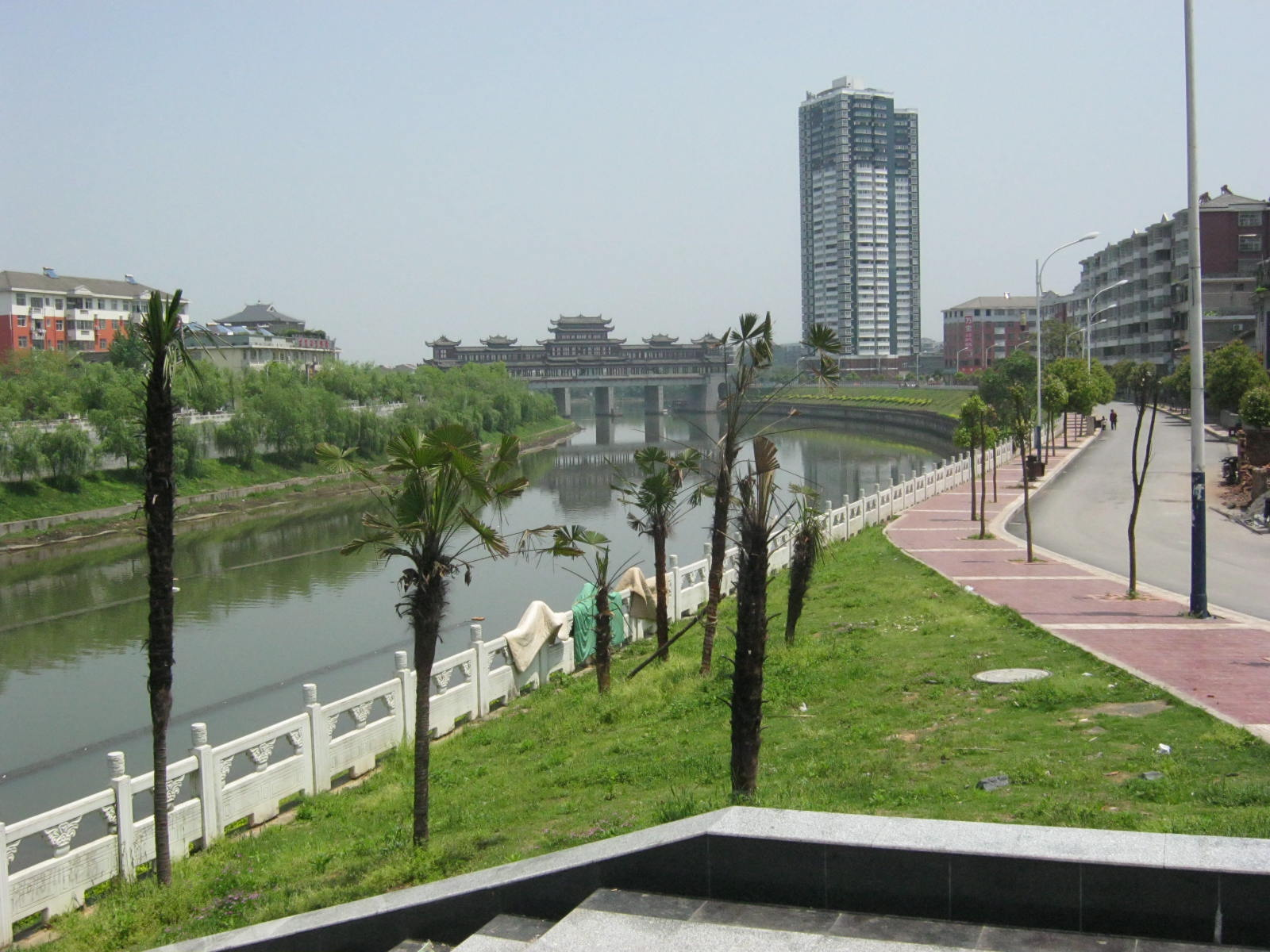

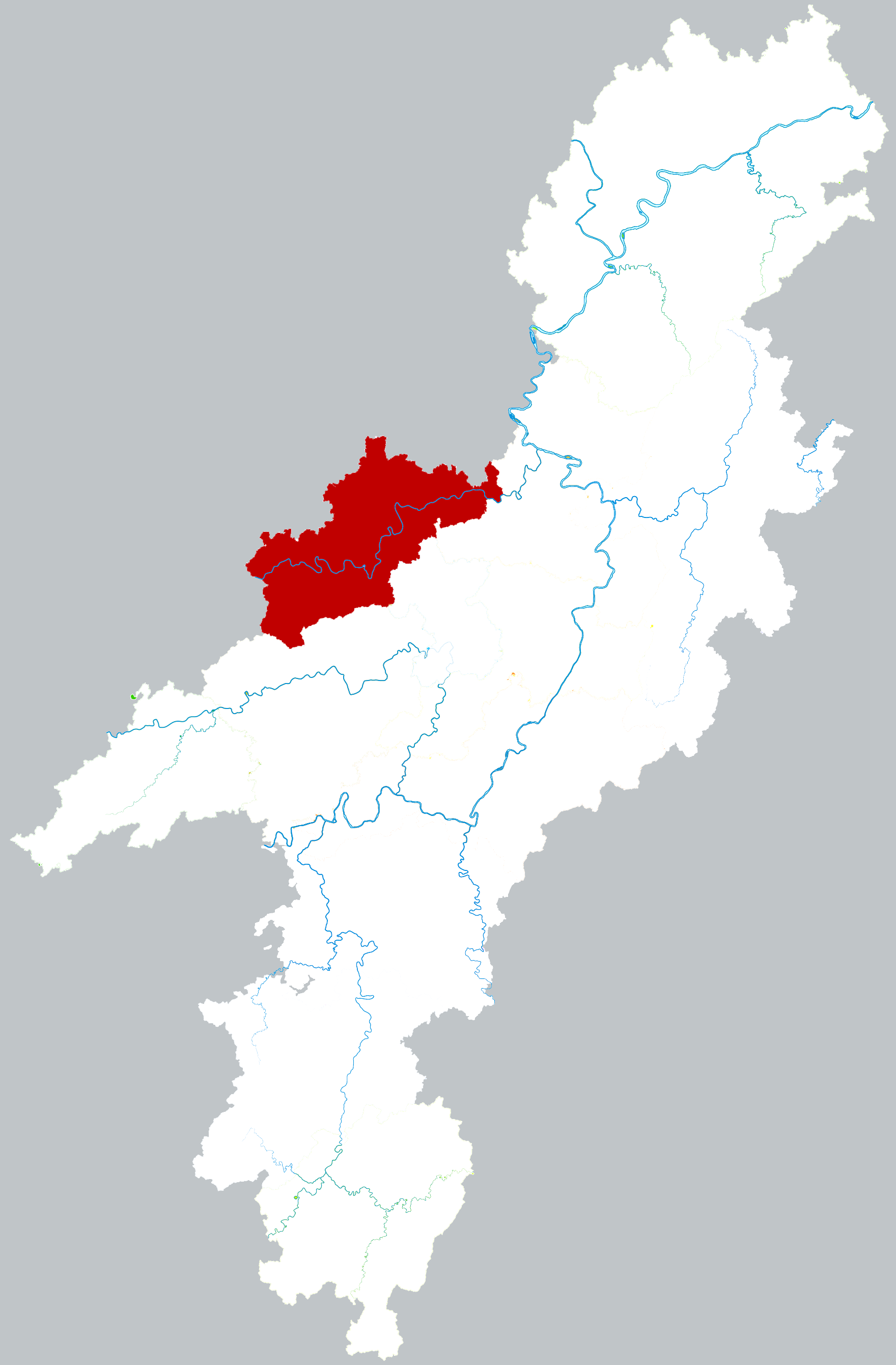
- Location of Mayang Miao Autonomous County within Huaihua

- Location in Hunan
- Coordinates: 27°51′50″N 109°48′04″E
- Country: People's Republic of China
- Province: Hunan
- Prefecture-level city: Huaihua

Area
  - Total: 1,560.93 km^{2} (602.68 sq mi)

Population (2010)
  - Total: 343,309
  - Density: 219.939/km^{2} (569.639/sq mi)
- Time zone: UTC+8 (China Standard)
- Postal code: 4194XX

Mayang ( "Mayang Miao Autonomous County", simplified Chinese: 麻阳苗族自治县; traditional Chinese: 麻陽苗族自治縣; pinyin: Máyáng Miáozú Zìzhìxiàn; usually referred to as "Mayang County", simplified Chinese: 麻阳县; traditional Chinese: 麻陽縣; pinyin: Máyáng Xiàn) is an autonomous county of Miao people in Hunan Province, China. It is under the administration of the prefecture-level city of Huaihua.

Mayang is located on the west central margin of Hunan Province, adjacent to Guizhou Province. It borders Bijiang District of Tongren, Guizhou to the west, Fenghuang County to the northwest, Luxi County to the northeast, Chenxi County and Hecheng District of Huaihua to the southeast, and Zhijiang County to the south. The county covers an area of 1,568.19 km^{2} (605.48 sq mi), and as of 2015, It had a registered population of 403,400 and a resident population of 349,000. The county seat is the town of Gaocun (高村镇) and it has seven towns and 11 townships under its jurisdiction.

== Etymology ==
Mayang derives its name from Mayangshu (麻阳戍), a military garrison established in the year 562 by the Southern Chen dynasty to guard against southern tribes. The Garrison was located at the mouth of Taiping Creek, where the Creek flows into the Chenshui (Jinjiang River) and forms a wide and deep pond called Matan (麻潭). Seated on the northern bank of the pond, the place was named "Mayang" according to Chinese traditions of naming places.

== History ==
=== Ancient history ===
In 562, the Southern Chen dynasty established Mayangshu (麻阳戍) at what is now Taipingxi, Lüjiaping Town (吕家坪镇太平溪).

In 620, the Tang Dynasty established Mayang County, with the county seat located in what is now Jiuxian, Huangsang Township (黄桑乡旧县村).

In 1075, the Song Dynasty incorporated Jinzhou Fort (锦州砦) and Zhaoyu County (诏谕县) into Mayang County, with the county seat located in what is now Jinhe Town (锦和镇).

=== Modern history (1949-) ===
On September 29, 1949, Mayang was liberated by the People's Liberation Army.

On March 28, 1950, the People's Government of Mayang County was established.

In March 1953, the county seat was relocated to Gaocun Town.

On October 31, 1988, under the approval of the State Council, the county was renamed "Mayang Miao Autonomous County".

== Climate ==
Climate data for Mayang, elevation 177 m (581 ft), (1991–2020 normals, extremes 1981–2010)
Month	Jan	Feb	Mar	Apr	May	Jun	Jul	Aug	Sep	Oct	Nov	Dec	Year
Record high °C (°F)	26.1 (79.0)	30.5 (86.9)	35.0 (95.0)	34.5 (94.1)	36.2 (97.2)	37.1 (98.8)	39.5 (103.1)	40.4 (104.7)	39.4 (102.9)	36.5 (97.7)	31.8 (89.2)	23.2 (73.8)	40.4 (104.7)
Mean daily maximum °C (°F)	9.0 (48.2)	11.9 (53.4)	16.4 (61.5)	22.6 (72.7)	26.8 (80.2)	29.8 (85.6)	33.2 (91.8)	33.3 (91.9)	29.4 (84.9)	23.1 (73.6)	17.5 (63.5)	11.7 (53.1)	22.1 (71.7)
Daily mean °C (°F)	5.6 (42.1)	7.9 (46.2)	11.9 (53.4)	17.6 (63.7)	21.9 (71.4)	25.4 (77.7)	28.3 (82.9)	28.0 (82.4)	24.1 (75.4)	18.4 (65.1)	13.0 (55.4)	7.7 (45.9)	17.5 (63.5)
Mean daily minimum °C (°F)	3.3 (37.9)	5.2 (41.4)	8.8 (47.8)	14.0 (57.2)	18.4 (65.1)	22.2 (72.0)	24.6 (76.3)	24.2 (75.6)	20.5 (68.9)	15.3 (59.5)	10.0 (50.0)	5.0 (41.0)	14.3 (57.7)
Record low °C (°F)	−3.8 (25.2)	−3.6 (25.5)	−0.3 (31.5)	3.6 (38.5)	9.0 (48.2)	14.3 (57.7)	17.9 (64.2)	17.2 (63.0)	12.7 (54.9)	4.9 (40.8)	−0.5 (31.1)	−3.2 (26.2)	−3.8 (25.2)
Average precipitation mm (inches)	50.2 (1.98)	54.6 (2.15)	95.4 (3.76)	128.2 (5.05)	205.3 (8.08)	251.4 (9.90)	194.7 (7.67)	101.3 (3.99)	85.5 (3.37)	86.3 (3.40)	65.2 (2.57)	38.0 (1.50)	1,356.1 (53.42)
Average precipitation days (≥ 0.1 mm)	12.9	12.7	16.7	16.7	16.8	15.4	11.5	10.4	9.0	12.0	10.7	10.6	155.4
Average snowy days	4.3	2.4	0.3	0	0	0	0	0	0	0	0	1.6	8.6
Average relative humidity (%)	78	78	79	80	81	83	78	76	76	79	79	77	79
Mean monthly sunshine hours	44.6	49.9	72.9	100.6	113.6	113.7	196.2	200.2	141.5	102.9	85.2	69.3	1,290.6
Percentage possible sunshine	14	16	20	26	27	27	47	50	39	29	27	22	29
Source: China Meteorological Administration

== Notable people ==
- TENG Daiyuan (1904–1974): The first Minister of Railways of the People's Republic of China; Vice-Chairperson (1949–1965) of the CPPCC National Committee (1964–1974).
