= Luxi County, Hunan =

Luxi County 泸溪县 Luki
- County
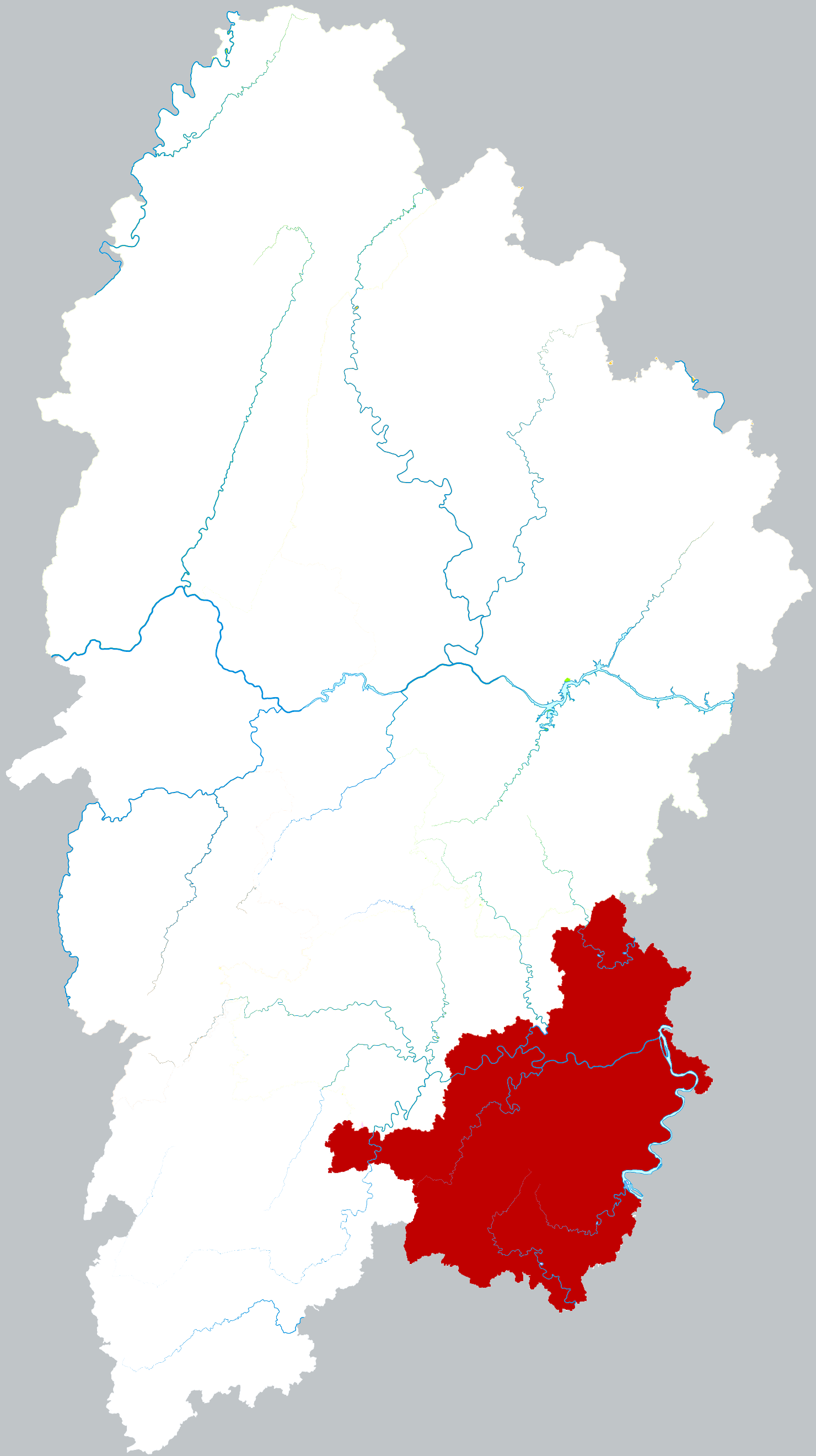
- Location of Luxi County within Xiangxi

- Location in Hunan
- Coordinates: 28°12′58″N 110°13′12″E
- Country: People's Republic of China
- Province: Hunan
- Autonomous prefecture: Xiangxi

Area
  - Total: 1,568.65 km^{2} (605.66 sq mi)

Population (2010)
  - Total: 273,361
  - Density: 174.265/km^{2} (451.345/sq mi)
- Time zone: UTC+8 (China Standard)
- Postal code: 4161XX

Luxi County (simplified Chinese: 泸溪县; traditional Chinese: 瀘溪縣; pinyin: Lúxī Xiàn) is a county of Hunan Province, China. It is under the administration of Xiangxi Autonomous Prefecture.

Located on the western part of Hunan and the south eastern Xiangxi, the county is bordered to the northeast by Yuanling County, to the southeast by Chenxi County, to the south by Mayang County, to the southwest by Fenghuang County, and to the northwest by Jishou City and Guzhang County. Luxi County covers an area of 1,565.5 km^{2} (604.4 sq mi), and as of 2015, it had a registered population of 310,800 and a resident population of 289,500. The county has 7 towns and 4 townships under its jurisdiction, and the county seat is Wuxi (武溪镇).

== Climate ==
Climate data for Luxi, elevation 186 m (610 ft), (1991–2020 normals, extremes 1981–present)
| Month | Jan | Feb | Mar | Apr | May | Jun | Jul | Aug | Sep | Oct | Nov | Dec | Year |
|---|---|---|---|---|---|---|---|---|---|---|---|---|---|
| Record high °C (°F) | 23.5 (74.3) | 29.5 (85.1) | 33.6 (92.5) | 34.8 (94.6) | 36.0 (96.8) | 37.7 (99.9) | 40.2 (104.4) | 39.9 (103.8) | 38.4 (101.1) | 35.0 (95.0) | 31.3 (88.3) | 23.5 (74.3) | 40.2 (104.4) |
| Mean daily maximum °C (°F) | 8.8 (47.8) | 11.6 (52.9) | 16.2 (61.2) | 22.3 (72.1) | 26.5 (79.7) | 29.6 (85.3) | 32.8 (91.0) | 32.9 (91.2) | 28.9 (84.0) | 22.8 (73.0) | 17.3 (63.1) | 11.5 (52.7) | 21.8 (71.2) |
| Daily mean °C (°F) | 5.4 (41.7) | 7.7 (45.9) | 11.7 (53.1) | 17.2 (63.0) | 21.5 (70.7) | 25.0 (77.0) | 27.9 (82.2) | 27.7 (81.9) | 23.8 (74.8) | 18.3 (64.9) | 12.9 (55.2) | 7.7 (45.9) | 17.2 (63.0) |
| Mean daily minimum °C (°F) | 3.0 (37.4) | 5.0 (41.0) | 8.5 (47.3) | 13.7 (56.7) | 18.0 (64.4) | 21.8 (71.2) | 24.3 (75.7) | 24.1 (75.4) | 20.3 (68.5) | 15.2 (59.4) | 9.9 (49.8) | 5.0 (41.0) | 14.1 (57.3) |
| Record low °C (°F) | −4.8 (23.4) | −4.5 (23.9) | −0.8 (30.6) | 3.1 (37.6) | 8.0 (46.4) | 12.2 (54.0) | 18.4 (65.1) | 16.8 (62.2) | 12.6 (54.7) | 4.4 (39.9) | −1.5 (29.3) | −3.7 (25.3) | −4.8 (23.4) |
| Average precipitation mm (inches) | 49.0 (1.93) | 54.3 (2.14) | 95.9 (3.78) | 143.4 (5.65) | 202.2 (7.96) | 229.4 (9.03) | 209.7 (8.26) | 122.5 (4.82) | 82.8 (3.26) | 93.4 (3.68) | 63.2 (2.49) | 36.8 (1.45) | 1,382.6 (54.45) |
| Average precipitation days (≥ 0.1 mm) | 12.7 | 12.2 | 15.7 | 15.8 | 16.5 | 14.7 | 11.5 | 9.4 | 8.6 | 11.7 | 10.5 | 10.0 | 149.3 |
| Average snowy days | 4.6 | 2.7 | 0.4 | 0 | 0 | 0 | 0 | 0 | 0 | 0 | 0.1 | 1.6 | 9.4 |
| Average relative humidity (%) | 75 | 75 | 77 | 79 | 81 | 83 | 80 | 77 | 76 | 77 | 77 | 73 | 78 |
| Mean monthly sunshine hours | 51.9 | 54.6 | 77.8 | 103.9 | 124.3 | 126.9 | 207.4 | 214.0 | 151.1 | 106.6 | 91.7 | 72.2 | 1,382.4 |
| Percentage possible sunshine | 16 | 17 | 21 | 27 | 30 | 31 | 49 | 53 | 41 | 30 | 29 | 23 | 31 |
Source: China Meteorological Administration
