= Guzhang County =

Guzhang County 古丈县
- County
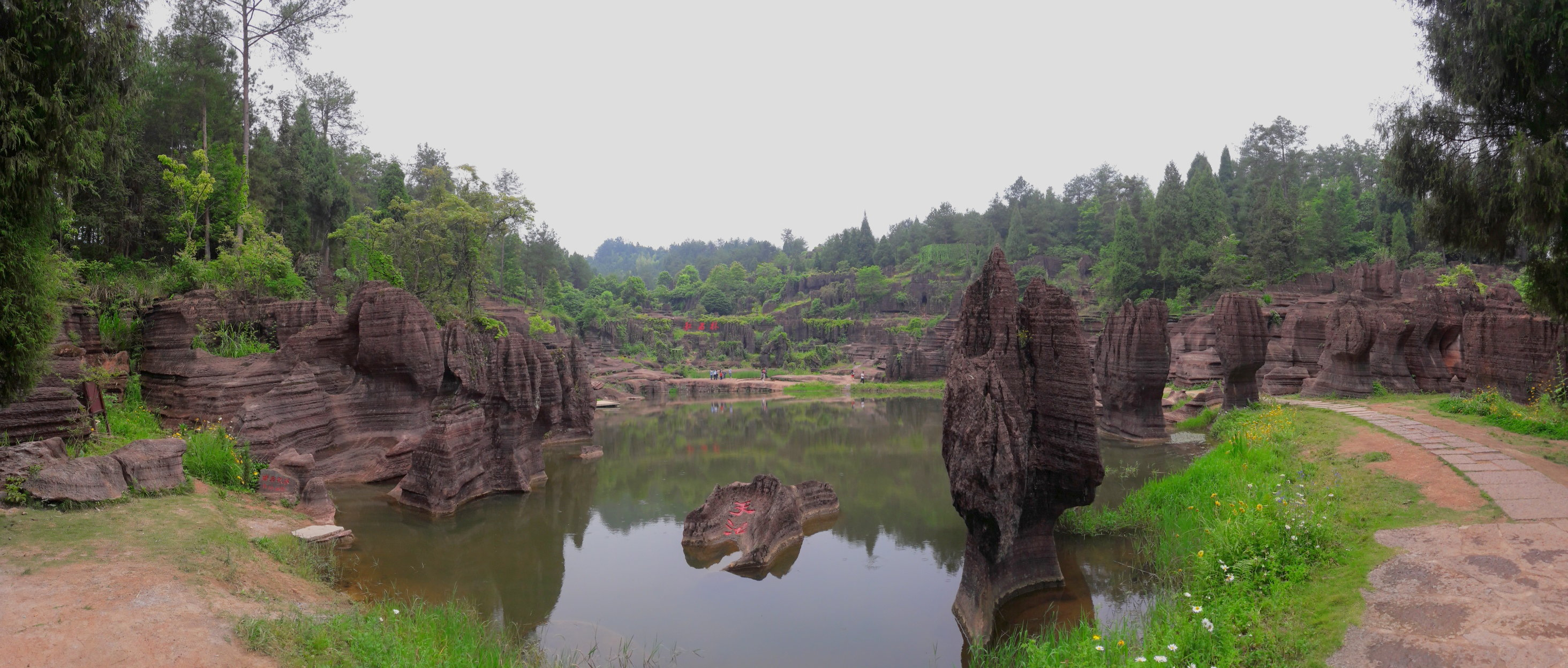

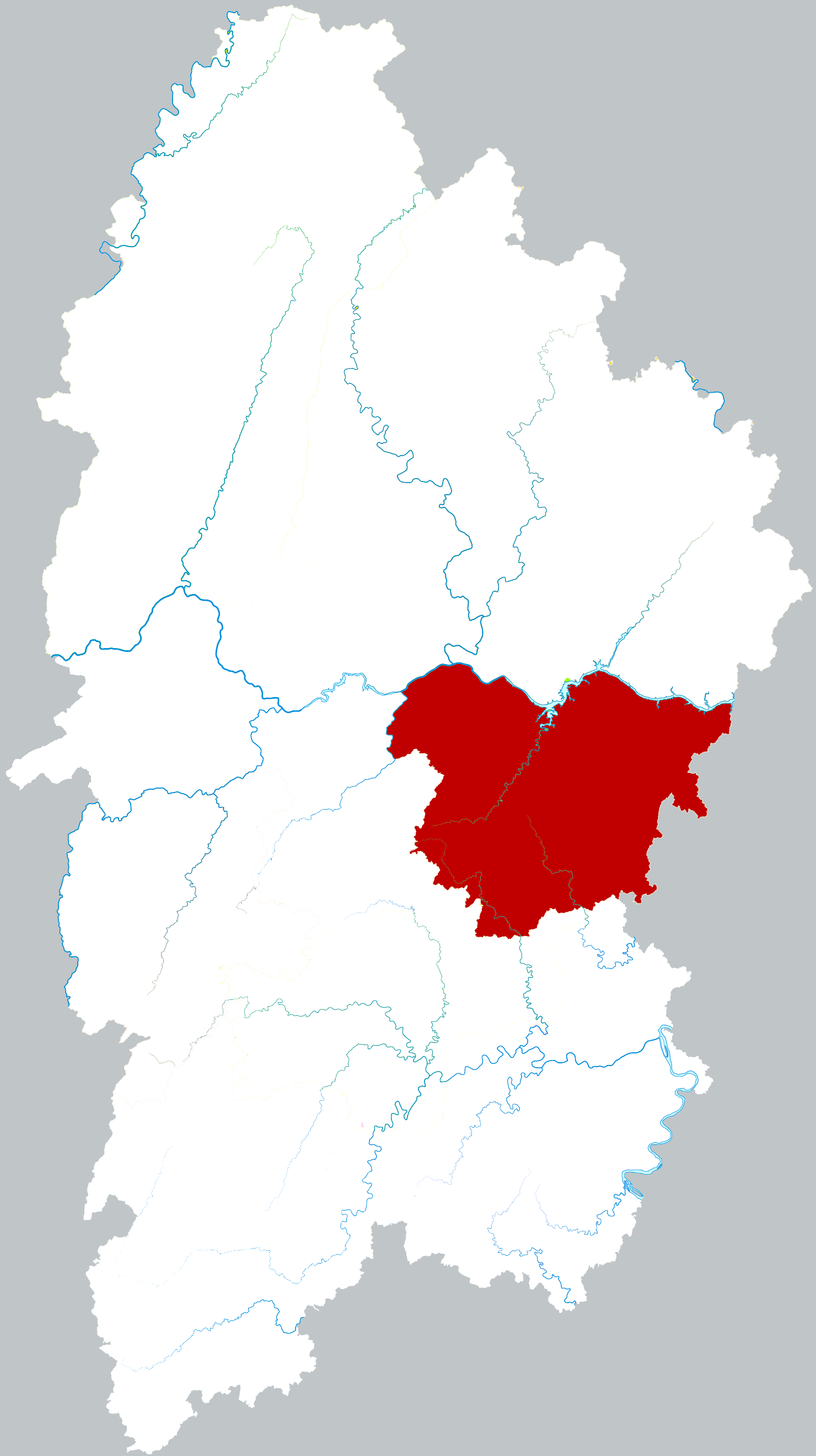
- Location of Guzhang County within Xiangxi

- Location of the seat in Hunan
- Coordinates: 28°37′01″N 109°57′04″E
- Country: People's Republic of China
- Province: Hunan
- Autonomous prefecture: Xiangxi

Area
  - Total: 1,286.23 km^{2} (496.62 sq mi)

Population (2010)
  - Total: 144,800
  - Density: 112.6/km^{2} (291.6/sq mi)
- Time zone: UTC+8 (China Standard)
- Postal code: 4163XX

Guzhang County (simplified Chinese: 古丈县; traditional Chinese: 古丈縣; pinyin: Gǔzhàng Xiàn) is a county of Hunan Province, China. The county is the 2nd least populous administrative unit of the counties or county-level cities (after Shaoshan City) in the province. It is under the administration of Xiangxi Autonomous Prefecture.

Located in the northwest of Hunan and in the east of Xiangxi Prefecture, the county is bordered to the north by Yongshun County, to the east by Yuanling County, to the south by Luxi County and Jishou City, and to the west by Baojing County. Guzhang County covers an area of 1,286.47 km^{2} (496.71 sq mi), and as of 2015, it had a registered population of 143,182 and a resident population of 131,900. The county has 7 towns under its jurisdiction, and the county seat is Guyang (古阳镇).

== Ethnic groups ==
Guzhang County includes the following ethnic groups (Wu 2007, 2010).

- Xiang (乡)
- Miao (苗; Hmong pronunciation: [bɤ˧ kɑu˦˩])
  - Shen Miao (深苗; Hmong pronunciation: [sɔŋ˥ miau˥]): in Shanzhao (山枣) and Yezhu (野竹). Also called "Gelao" (仡佬). Their language is also called Zhang ((章话, 章语).
  - Qian Miao (浅苗; Hmong pronunciation: [tshai˦˩ miau˥]): in Morong (默戎) and Pingba (坪坝).

== Geology ==
The Guzhangian Age of the Cambrian Period is named after Guzhang County. In particular, the Louyixi Global boundary Stratotype Section and Point is named after the Louyixi Town in Guzhang County.

== Climate ==
Climate data for Guzhang, elevation 302 m (991 ft), (1991–2020 normals, extremes 1981–present)
Month	Jan	Feb	Mar	Apr	May	Jun	Jul	Aug	Sep	Oct	Nov	Dec	Year
Record high °C (°F)	23.6 (74.5)	29.8 (85.6)	33.3 (91.9)	35.6 (96.1)	35.5 (95.9)	36.5 (97.7)	39.7 (103.5)	39.6 (103.3)	38.3 (100.9)	34.7 (94.5)	29.8 (85.6)	23.7 (74.7)	39.7 (103.5)
Mean daily maximum °C (°F)	9.0 (48.2)	11.5 (52.7)	16.2 (61.2)	22.3 (72.1)	26.2 (79.2)	29.2 (84.6)	32.3 (90.1)	32.5 (90.5)	28.5 (83.3)	22.4 (72.3)	17.3 (63.1)	11.6 (52.9)	21.6 (70.9)
Daily mean °C (°F)	5.0 (41.0)	7.1 (44.8)	11.0 (51.8)	16.5 (61.7)	20.7 (69.3)	24.2 (75.6)	26.9 (80.4)	26.5 (79.7)	22.6 (72.7)	17.1 (62.8)	12.0 (53.6)	7.0 (44.6)	16.4 (61.5)
Mean daily minimum °C (°F)	2.5 (36.5)	4.3 (39.7)	7.8 (46.0)	12.9 (55.2)	17.1 (62.8)	21.0 (69.8)	23.3 (73.9)	22.9 (73.2)	19.2 (66.6)	14.1 (57.4)	9.0 (48.2)	4.2 (39.6)	13.2 (55.7)
Record low °C (°F)	−4.8 (23.4)	−4.7 (23.5)	−1.9 (28.6)	1.6 (34.9)	8.1 (46.6)	11.8 (53.2)	16.7 (62.1)	14.6 (58.3)	11.8 (53.2)	3.4 (38.1)	−2.0 (28.4)	−4.4 (24.1)	−4.8 (23.4)
Average precipitation mm (inches)	51.9 (2.04)	55.5 (2.19)	92.2 (3.63)	130.2 (5.13)	206.7 (8.14)	215.4 (8.48)	212.9 (8.38)	140.4 (5.53)	98.7 (3.89)	103.9 (4.09)	69.7 (2.74)	35.5 (1.40)	1,413 (55.64)
Average precipitation days (≥ 0.1 mm)	12.7	13.3	16.2	16.4	17.6	16.3	13.8	12.1	10.1	14.5	11.9	10.6	165.5
Average snowy days	5.1	3.1	0.9	0	0	0	0	0	0	0	0.2	1.9	11.2
Average relative humidity (%)	81	81	81	82	83	85	82	81	81	84	84	80	82
Mean monthly sunshine hours	55.1	54.1	75.1	99.6	116.1	114.8	191.8	194.7	134.7	95.1	87.1	70.8	1,289
Percentage possible sunshine	17	17	20	26	28	27	45	48	37	27	27	22	28
Source: China Meteorological Administration
