= Yuanling County =

Yuanling County 沅陵县 Shenchow, Yüan-ling
- County
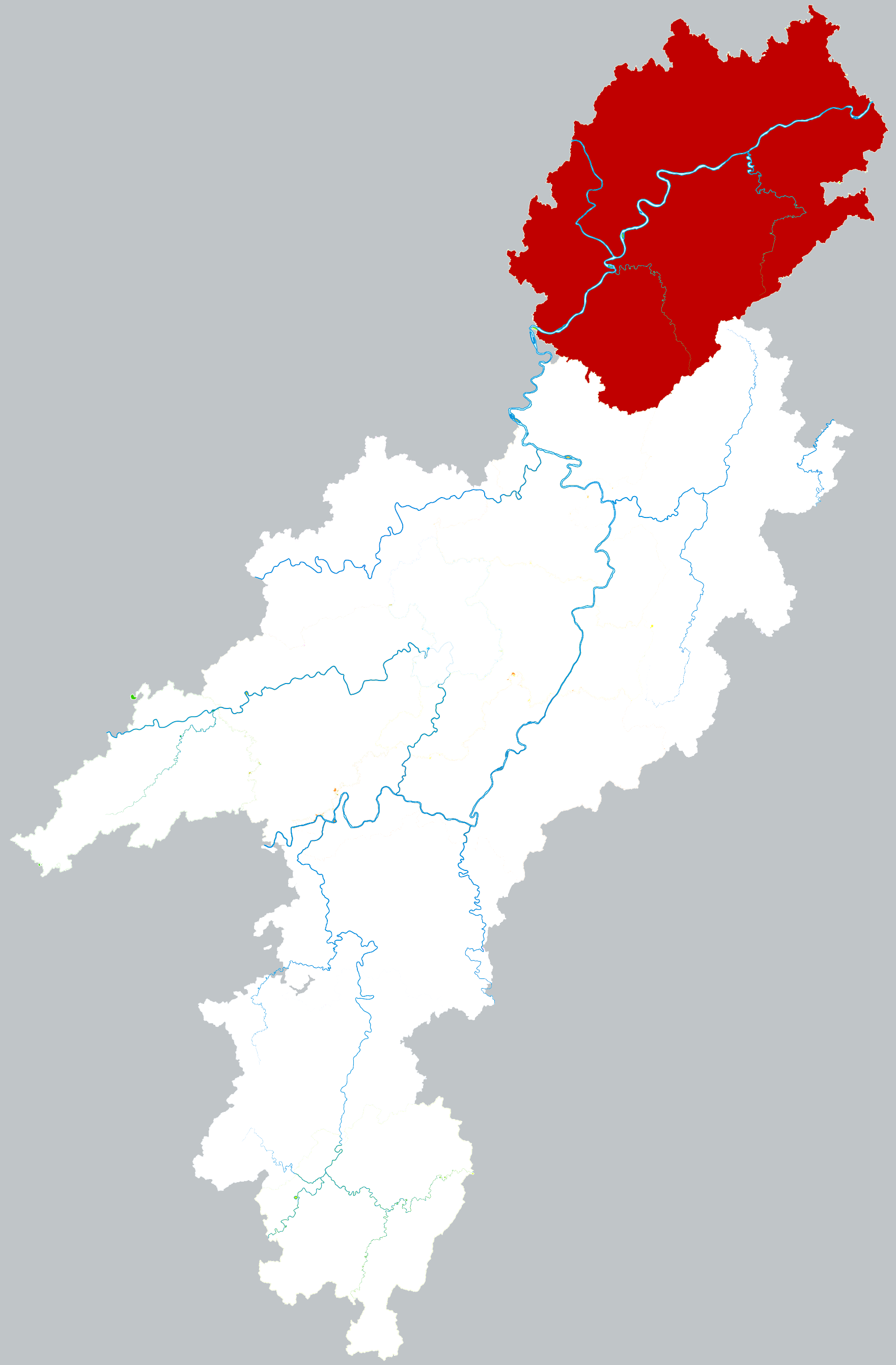
- Location of Yuanling County within Huaihua

- Location in Hunan
- Coordinates: 28°27′25″N 110°23′56″E
- Country: People's Republic of China
- Province: Hunan
- Prefecture-level city: Huaihua

Area
  - Total: 5,825.51 km^{2} (2,249.24 sq mi)

Population (2010)
  - Total: 582,582
  - Density: 100.005/km^{2} (259.013/sq mi)
- Time zone: UTC+8 (China Standard)
- Postal code: 4196XX

Yuanling County (simplified Chinese: 沅陵县; traditional Chinese: 沅陵縣; pinyin: Yuánlíng Xiàn) is a county of Hunan Province, China. It is under the administration of Huaihua prefecture-level city.

Located in northwest of the province, Yuanling is in the border locations of Huaihua, Xiangxi, Zhangjiajie, Changde and Yiyang five prefecture-level divisions. The Yuan River flows through it southwest to northeast. The county is bordered to the north by Yongding District, to the east by Taoyuan and Anhua Counties, to the south by Xupu and Chenxi Counties, and to the west by Luxi, Guzhang and Yongshun Counties. Yuanling County covers an area of 5,852 km^{2} (2,259 sq mi), and as of 2015, it had a registered population of 671,500 and a resident population of 601,800. Yuanling County has eight towns and 13 townships under its jurisdiction, and the county seat is Yuanling Town (沅陵镇).

== Ethnic groups ==
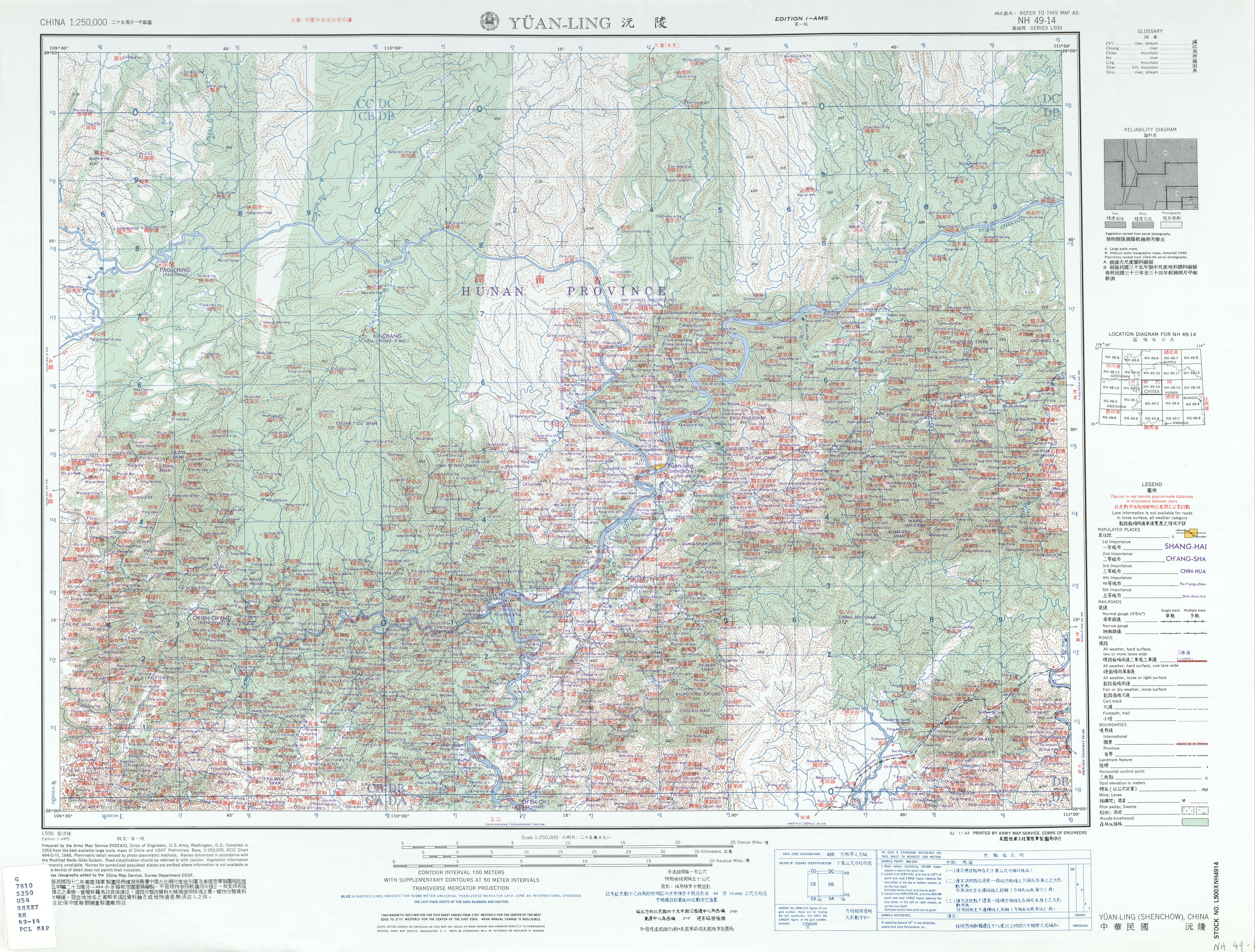
Map including Yuanling (labeled as Yüan-ling (SHENCHOW) 沅陵) (AMS, 1953)

According to the Yuanling County Gazetteer (1993:104), there are 36,715 ethnic Miao and 23,879 ethnic Tujia. There are also 135 ethnic Bai living in the Zhuhong Stream watershed 朱红溪 of Beirong District 北容区, namely the villages of Luoping 落坪, Qijiaxi 七甲溪, Daheping 大合坪. Yuanling is also home to the Waxiang people.

== Climate ==
Climate data for Yuanling, elevation 152 m (499 ft), (1991–2020 normals, extremes 1981–present)
Month	Jan	Feb	Mar	Apr	May	Jun	Jul	Aug	Sep	Oct	Nov	Dec	Year
Record high °C (°F)	22.7 (72.9)	29.5 (85.1)	33.6 (92.5)	36.1 (97.0)	35.8 (96.4)	37.4 (99.3)	39.6 (103.3)	40.0 (104.0)	38.3 (100.9)	34.6 (94.3)	29.6 (85.3)	23.4 (74.1)	40.0 (104.0)
Mean daily maximum °C (°F)	8.9 (48.0)	11.7 (53.1)	16.2 (61.2)	22.3 (72.1)	26.4 (79.5)	29.6 (85.3)	32.8 (91.0)	32.8 (91.0)	28.8 (83.8)	22.8 (73.0)	17.4 (63.3)	11.6 (52.9)	21.8 (71.2)
Daily mean °C (°F)	5.5 (41.9)	7.7 (45.9)	11.5 (52.7)	17.0 (62.6)	21.3 (70.3)	24.9 (76.8)	27.7 (81.9)	27.6 (81.7)	23.8 (74.8)	18.2 (64.8)	12.9 (55.2)	7.7 (45.9)	17.2 (62.9)
Mean daily minimum °C (°F)	3.1 (37.6)	4.9 (40.8)	8.3 (46.9)	13.5 (56.3)	17.8 (64.0)	21.6 (70.9)	24.1 (75.4)	24.0 (75.2)	20.3 (68.5)	15.2 (59.4)	9.9 (49.8)	5.1 (41.2)	14.0 (57.2)
Record low °C (°F)	−4.7 (23.5)	−4.2 (24.4)	−0.8 (30.6)	2.7 (36.9)	8.9 (48.0)	12.0 (53.6)	18.4 (65.1)	16.9 (62.4)	12.5 (54.5)	3.5 (38.3)	−1.3 (29.7)	−3.9 (25.0)	−4.7 (23.5)
Average precipitation mm (inches)	47.7 (1.88)	54.9 (2.16)	94.0 (3.70)	152.4 (6.00)	231.4 (9.11)	242.9 (9.56)	218.0 (8.58)	111.9 (4.41)	90.6 (3.57)	96.7 (3.81)	70.0 (2.76)	33.9 (1.33)	1,444.4 (56.87)
Average precipitation days (≥ 0.1 mm)	12.1	12.2	15.6	15.8	16.8	14.6	12.0	9.4	8.6	11.9	10.0	10.3	149.3
Average snowy days	4.7	2.8	1	0	0	0	0	0	0	0	0.1	1.8	10.4
Average relative humidity (%)	73	74	76	77	80	82	79	76	75	76	75	72	76
Mean monthly sunshine hours	47.3	50.5	71.4	98.5	116.7	119.7	195.6	201.5	138.4	105.3	87.5	70.1	1,302.5
Percentage possible sunshine	14	16	19	26	28	29	46	50	38	30	27	22	29
Source: China Meteorological Administration
