= Chenxi County =

Chenxi County 辰溪县 Chenki
- County
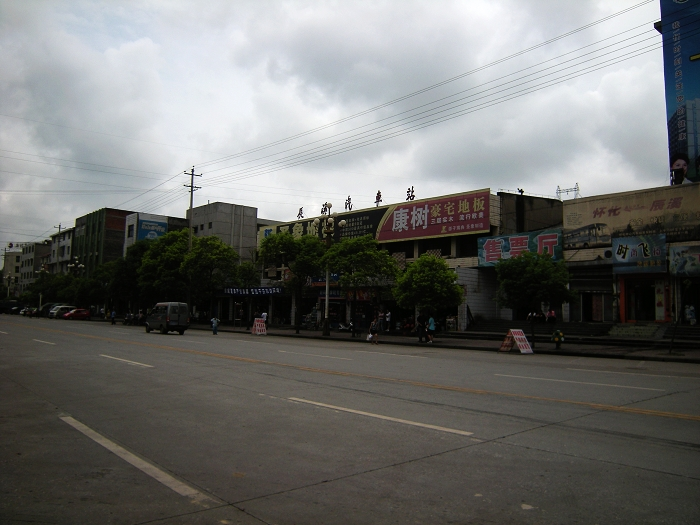

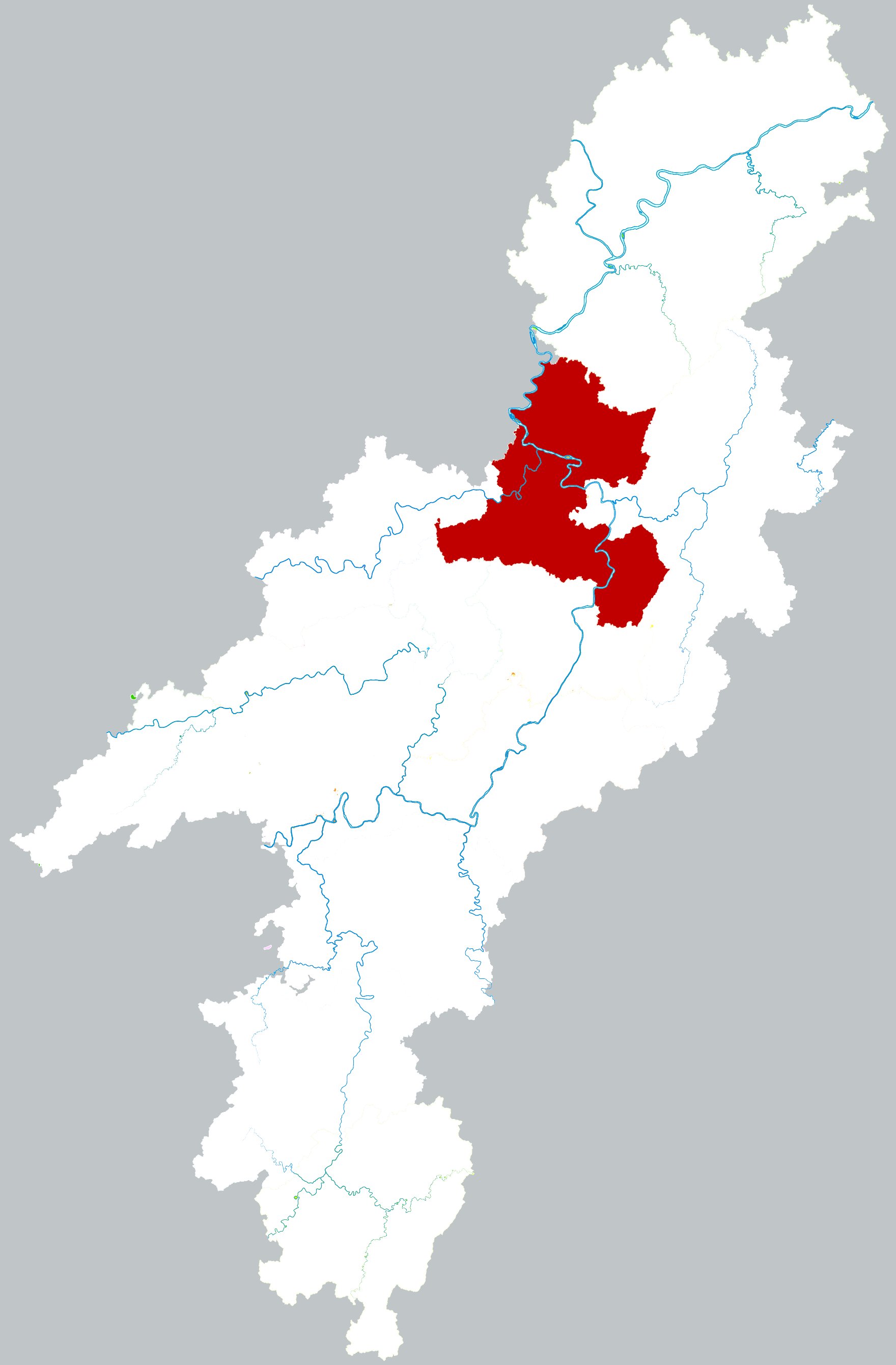
- Location of Chenxi County within Huaihua

- Location in Hunan
- Coordinates: 28°00′22″N 110°11′06″E
- Country: People's Republic of China
- Province: Hunan
- Prefecture-level city: Huaihua
- Seat: Chenyang

Area
  - Total: 1,976.81 km^{2} (763.25 sq mi)

Population (2010)
  - Total: 453,565
  - Density: 229.443/km^{2} (594.254/sq mi)
- Time zone: UTC+8 (China Standard)
- Postal code: 4195XX

Chenxi County (simplified Chinese: 辰溪县; traditional Chinese: 辰谿縣; pinyin: Chénxī Xiàn) is a county in Hunan Province, China. It is under the administration of Huaihua prefecture-level City.

Located on the north of the province, it is adjacent to the north of the city proper of Huaihua. The county is bordered to the north by Yuanling County, to the east by Xupu County, to the south by Zhongfang County and Hecheng District, to the west by Mayang and Luxi Counties. Chenxi County covers an area of 1,990.3 km^{2} (768.5 sq mi). As of 2015, it had a registered population of 530,000 and a resident population of 461,400. The county has nine towns and 14 townships under its jurisdiction, and the county seat is Chenyang (辰阳镇).

== History ==
During the Second Sino-Japanese War, as part of the Third Front strategy, Chengxi developed into an industrial center. Many government offices and public services moved from Japanese occupied areas to Chengxi and the population increased from 5,000 to over 100,000. Japanese air raids caused hundreds of deaths and burned much of the old city.

On 15 July 1996, the county was hit hard by floods.

== Climate ==
Climate data for Chenxi, elevation 153 m (502 ft), (1991–2020 normals, extremes 1981–present)
Month	Jan	Feb	Mar	Apr	May	Jun	Jul	Aug	Sep	Oct	Nov	Dec	Year
Record high °C (°F)	26.2 (79.2)	29.5 (85.1)	33.7 (92.7)	35.0 (95.0)	36.9 (98.4)	37.6 (99.7)	40.0 (104.0)	39.5 (103.1)	38.9 (102.0)	37.4 (99.3)	31.2 (88.2)	24.0 (75.2)	40.0 (104.0)
Mean daily maximum °C (°F)	8.9 (48.0)	11.8 (53.2)	16.4 (61.5)	22.6 (72.7)	26.9 (80.4)	29.9 (85.8)	33.2 (91.8)	33.2 (91.8)	29.3 (84.7)	23.1 (73.6)	17.5 (63.5)	11.6 (52.9)	22.0 (71.7)
Daily mean °C (°F)	5.6 (42.1)	8.0 (46.4)	12.0 (53.6)	17.7 (63.9)	22.1 (71.8)	25.6 (78.1)	28.5 (83.3)	28.1 (82.6)	24.3 (75.7)	18.6 (65.5)	13.1 (55.6)	7.8 (46.0)	17.6 (63.7)
Mean daily minimum °C (°F)	3.3 (37.9)	5.4 (41.7)	9.0 (48.2)	14.3 (57.7)	18.6 (65.5)	22.4 (72.3)	24.9 (76.8)	24.5 (76.1)	20.7 (69.3)	15.5 (59.9)	10.1 (50.2)	5.2 (41.4)	14.5 (58.1)
Record low °C (°F)	−4.2 (24.4)	−4.0 (24.8)	−0.5 (31.1)	3.4 (38.1)	8.7 (47.7)	13.3 (55.9)	18.3 (64.9)	16.9 (62.4)	12.5 (54.5)	4.6 (40.3)	−0.4 (31.3)	−3.5 (25.7)	−4.2 (24.4)
Average precipitation mm (inches)	54.1 (2.13)	60.4 (2.38)	104.2 (4.10)	150.4 (5.92)	223.1 (8.78)	251.6 (9.91)	224.8 (8.85)	122.3 (4.81)	83.9 (3.30)	89.5 (3.52)	67.9 (2.67)	39.1 (1.54)	1,471.3 (57.91)
Average precipitation days (≥ 0.1 mm)	13.0	13.0	16.5	16.0	16.3	14.6	12.1	10.3	8.1	11.3	10.0	10.2	151.4
Average snowy days	4.2	2.1	0.3	0	0	0	0	0	0	0	0	1.5	8.1
Average relative humidity (%)	77	77	78	78	79	81	76	74	74	77	77	75	77
Mean monthly sunshine hours	53.2	57.9	80.4	110.7	135.2	139.1	221.4	225.5	164.1	115.6	95.4	75.4	1,473.9
Percentage possible sunshine	16	18	22	29	32	33	52	56	45	33	30	23	32
Source: China Meteorological Administration All-time Oct extreme
