= Yuan River =

River in Hunan, China

Coordinates: 28°25′37″N 110°22′49″E

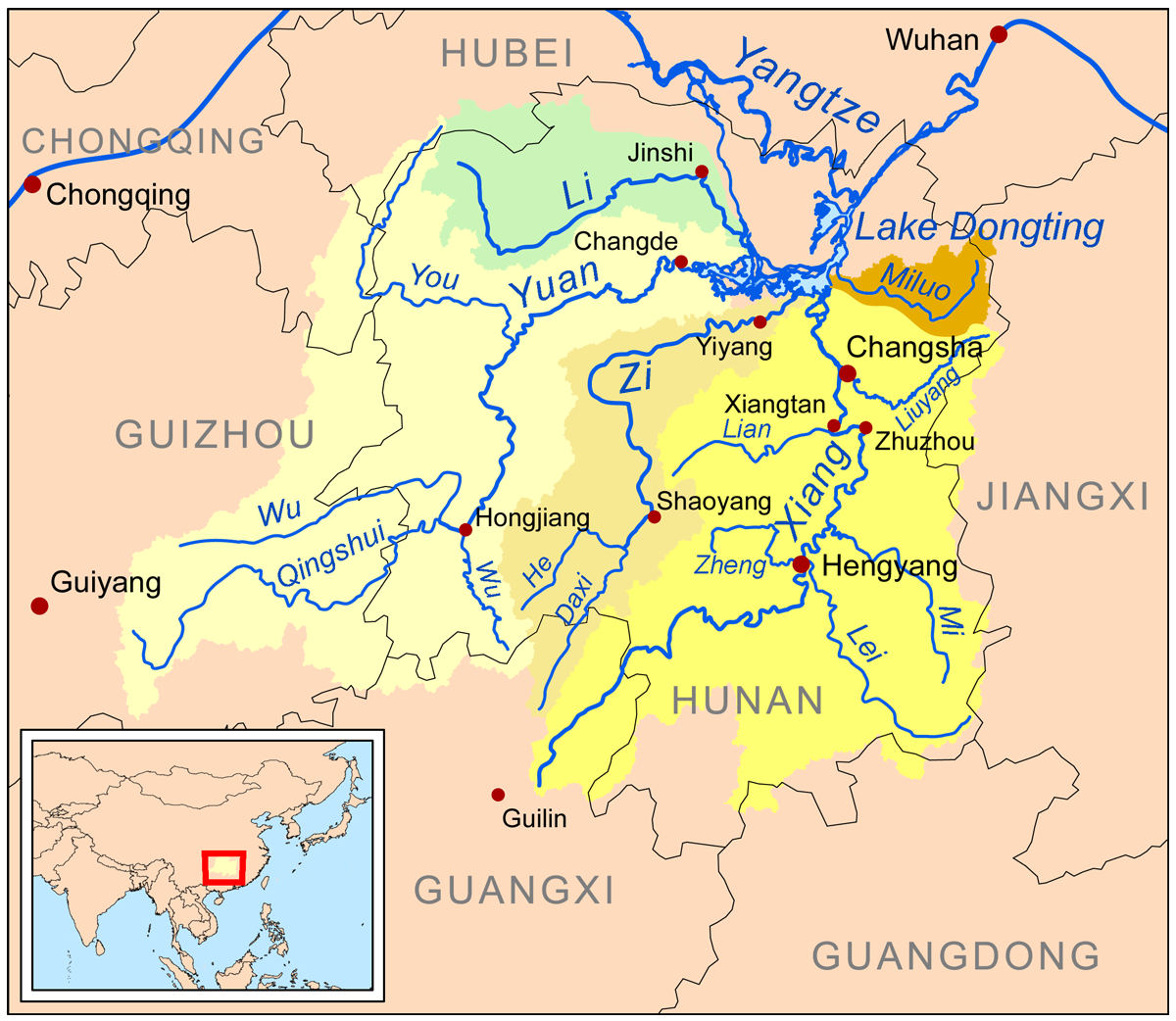
- Map showing the Yuan River basin (in light yellow)
- Chinese: 沅江
Transcriptions
Standard Mandarin
- Hanyu Pinyin: Yuán Jiāng
- Wade–Giles: Yüan Chiang

Alternative Chinese name
- Chinese: 沅水
Transcriptions
Standard Mandarin
- Hanyu Pinyin: Yuán Shuǐ
- Wade–Giles: Yüan Shui

The Yuan River, also known by its Chinese name as the Yuanjiang, is one of the four largest rivers in Hunan province in southeast-central China. It is a tributary of Yangtze River. It is 864 kilometres (537 mi) long and rises in Guizhou province in the Miao Mountains near Duyun and is navigable. The upper stream is called the Longtou River, and downstream it is called the Qingshui or Ch'ing-shui River. It becomes the Yuan River after its confluence with its northern tributary, the Wu River.

After its merger with the Wu River, the Yuan flows in a northeasterly direction, hugging the western side of the Xuefeng Mountains of Hunan. Ultimately, the Yuan flows into the Dongting Lake at Changde and from there into the Yangtze River. The Yuan serves as a major waterway for western Hunan and eastern Guizhou. The Yuan is navigable for large vessels up to Changde, whereas smaller boats can make it to Taoyuan.

== Gallery ==
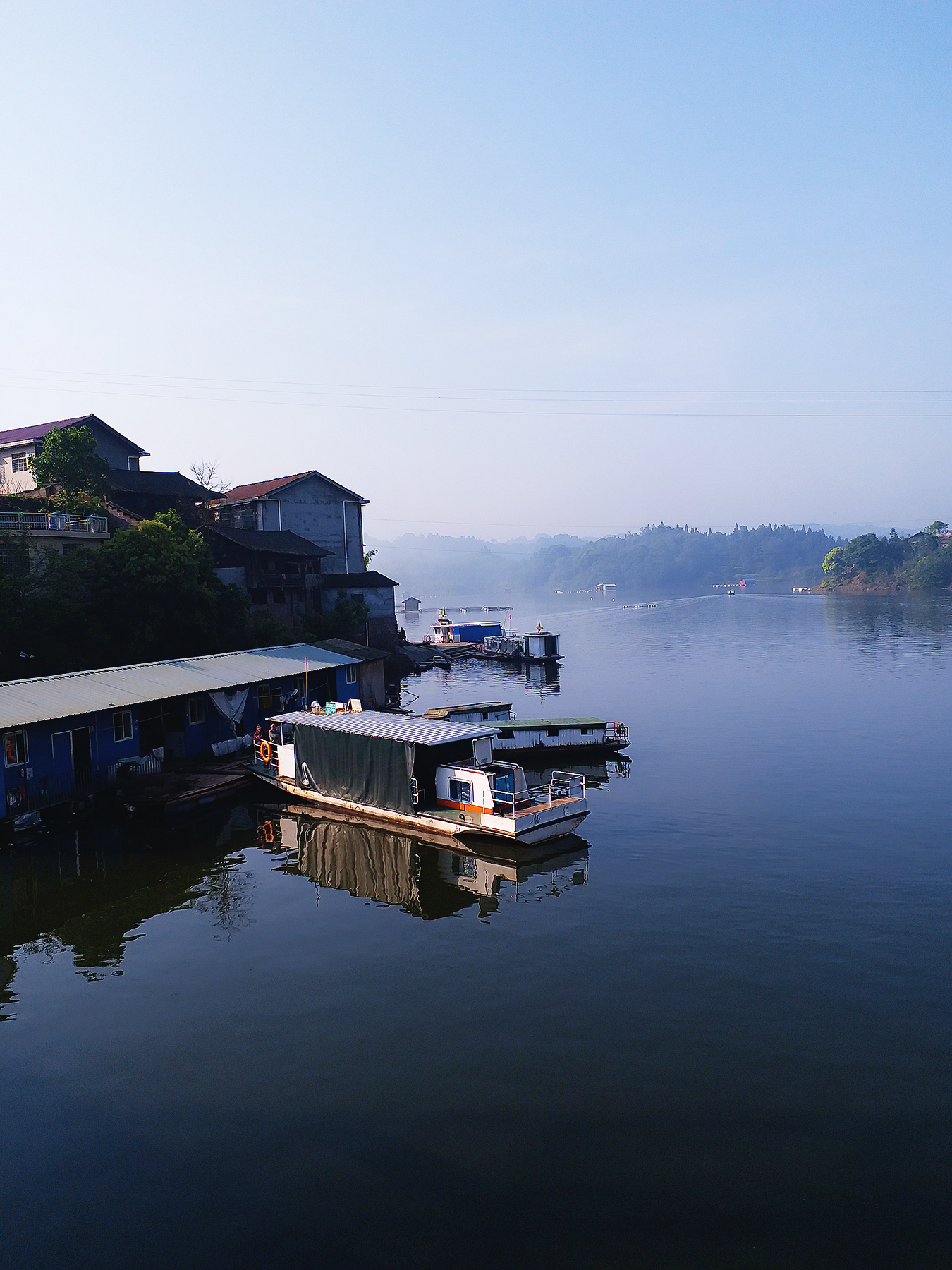
Yuan River in Xiaojiaqiao Township of Yuanling County, Huaihua, Hunan.

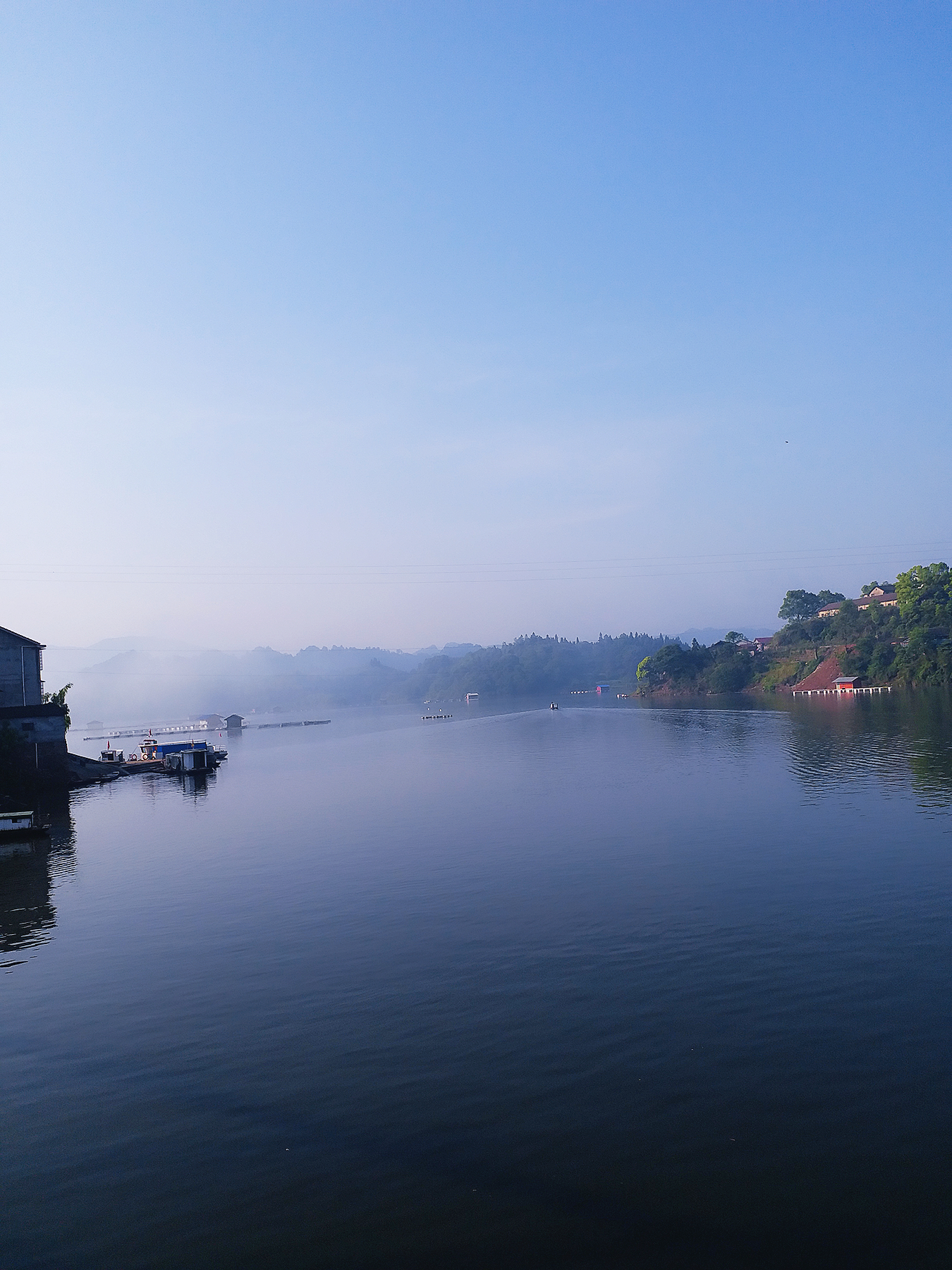
Yuan River in Xiaojiaqiao Township of Yuanling County, Huaihua, Hunan.

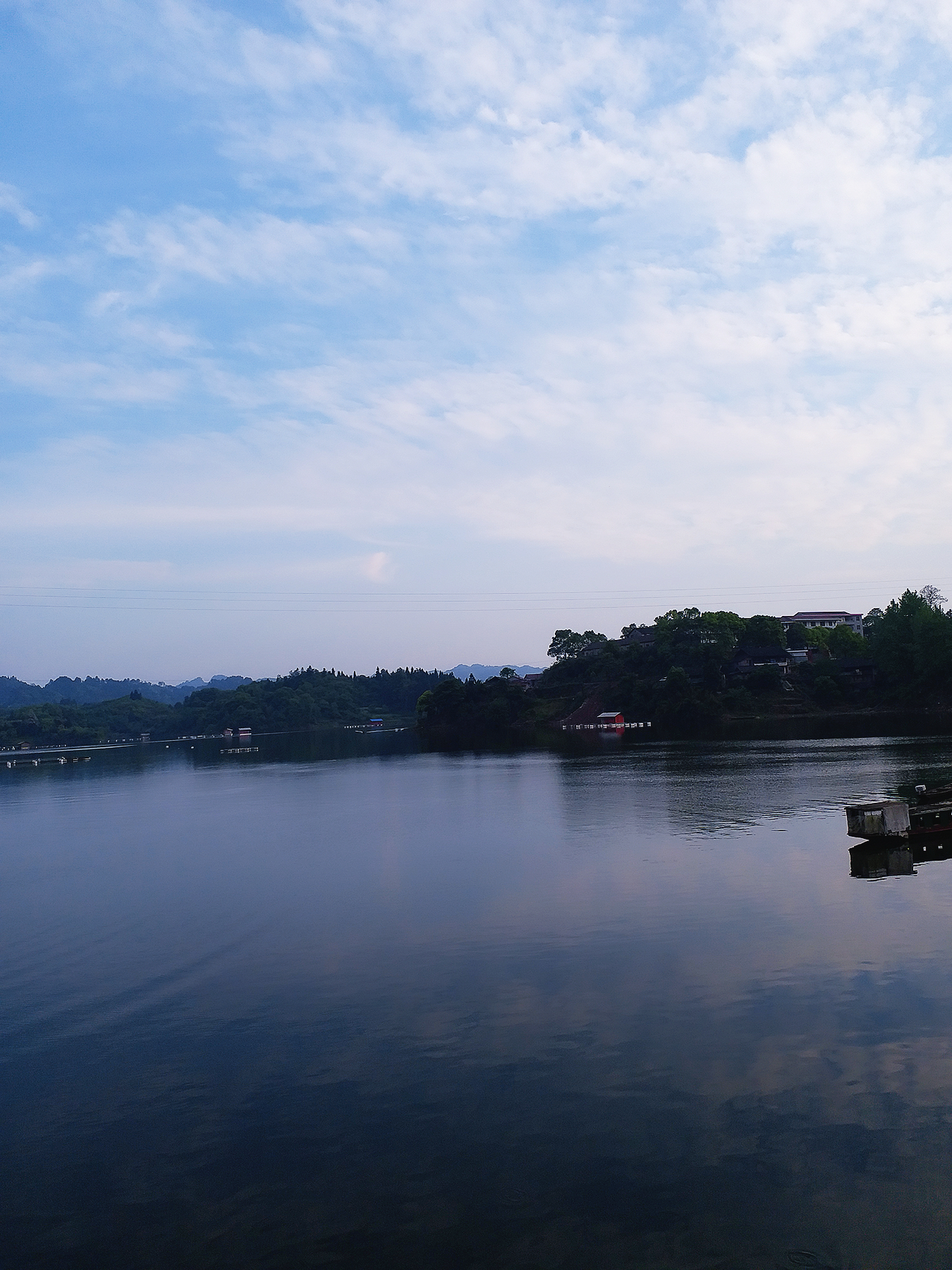
Yuan River in Xiaojiaqiao Township of Yuanling County, Huaihua, Hunan.

== See also ==
- Other Yuan Jiangs and Yuanjiangs
