= 2002 =

2002 in various calendars
- Gregorian calendar: 2002; MMII
- Ab urbe condita: 2755
- Armenian calendar: 1451; ԹՎ ՌՆԾԱ
- Assyrian calendar: 6752
- Baháʼí calendar: 158–159
- Balinese saka calendar: 1923–1924
- Bengali calendar: 1408–1409
- Berber calendar: 2952
- British Regnal year: 50 Eliz. 2 – 51 Eliz. 2
- Buddhist calendar: 2546
- Burmese calendar: 1364
- Byzantine calendar: 7510–7511
- Chinese calendar: 辛巳年 (Metal Snake); 4699 or 4492 — to — 壬午年 (Water Horse); 4700 or 4493
- Coptic calendar: 1718–1719
- Discordian calendar: 3168
- Ethiopian calendar: 1994–1995
- Hebrew calendar: 5762–5763
- Hindu calendars
- Vikram Samvat: 2058–2059
- Shaka Samvat: 1923–1924
- Kali Yuga: 5102–5103
- Holocene calendar: 12002
- Igbo calendar: 1002–1003
- Iranian calendar: 1380–1381
- Islamic calendar: 1422–1423
- Japanese calendar: Heisei 14 (平成１４年)
- Javanese calendar: 1934–1935
- Juche calendar: 91
- Julian calendar: Gregorian minus 13 days
- Korean calendar: 4335
- Minguo calendar: ROC 91 民國91年
- Nanakshahi calendar: 534
- Thai solar calendar: 2545
- Tibetan calendar: ལྕགས་མོ་སྦྲུལ་ལོ་ (female Iron-Snake); 2128 or 1747 or 975 — to — ཆུ་ཕོ་རྟ་ལོ་ (male Water-Horse); 2129 or 1748 or 976
- Unix time: 1009843200 – 1041379199

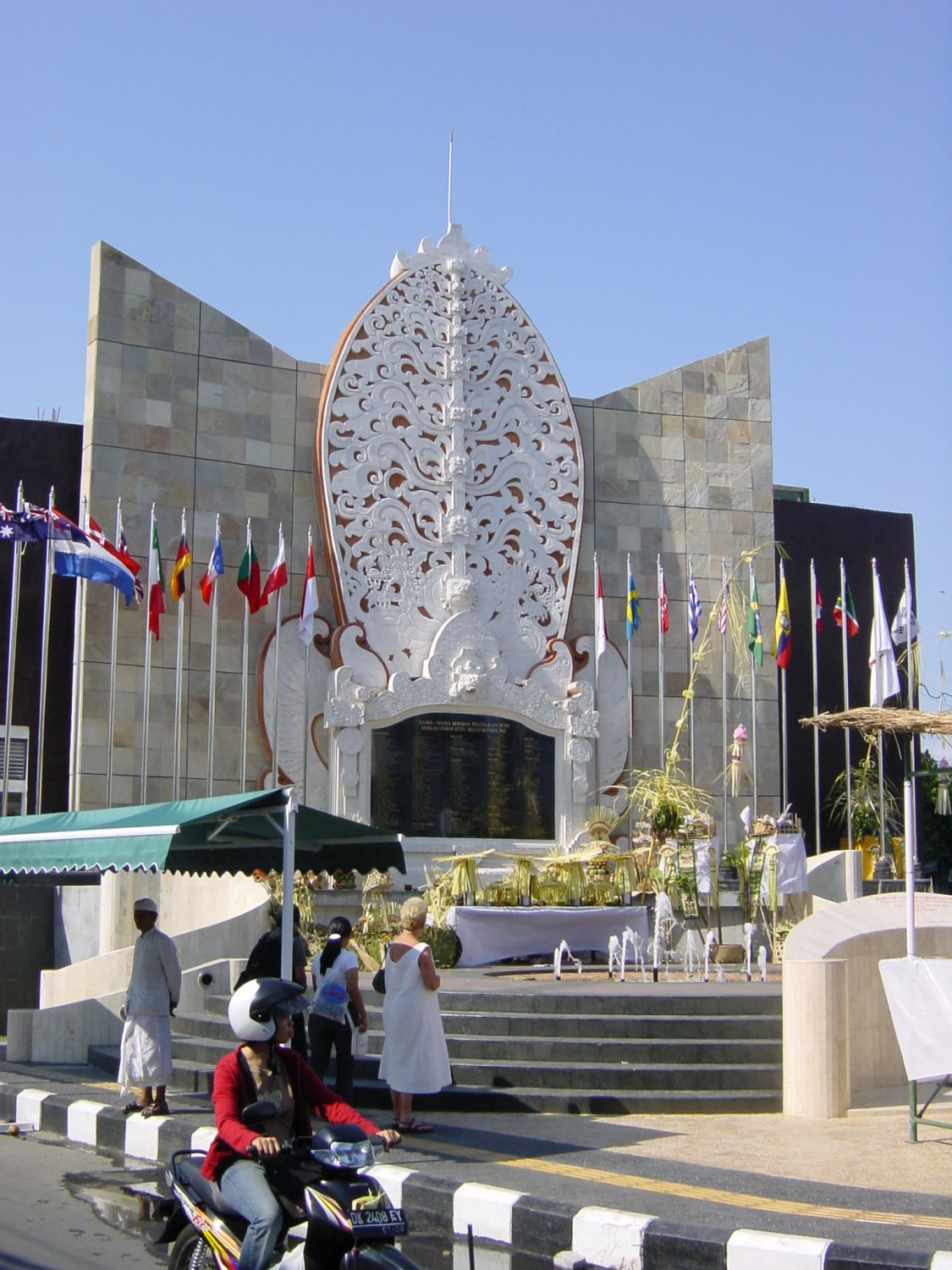
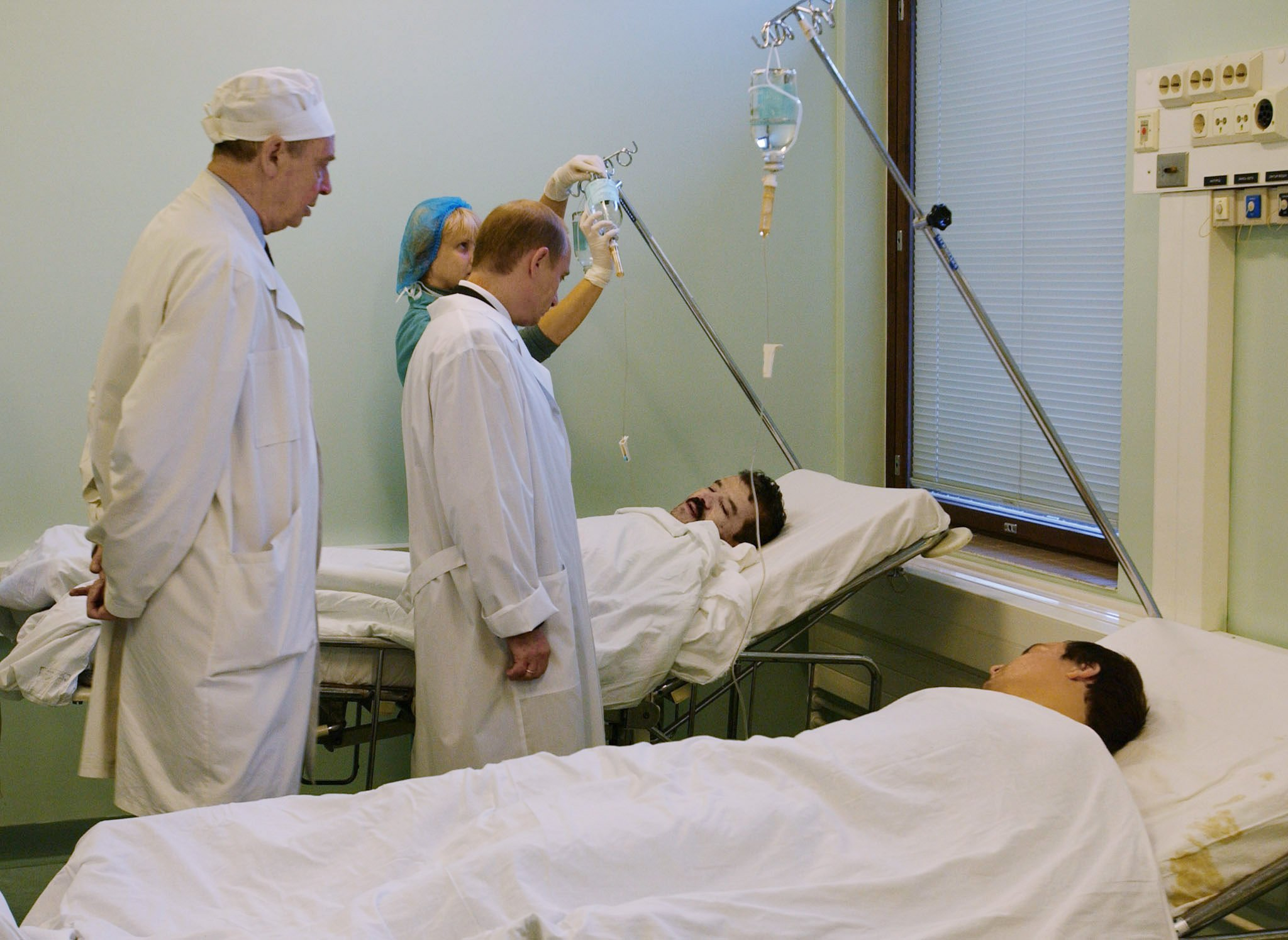
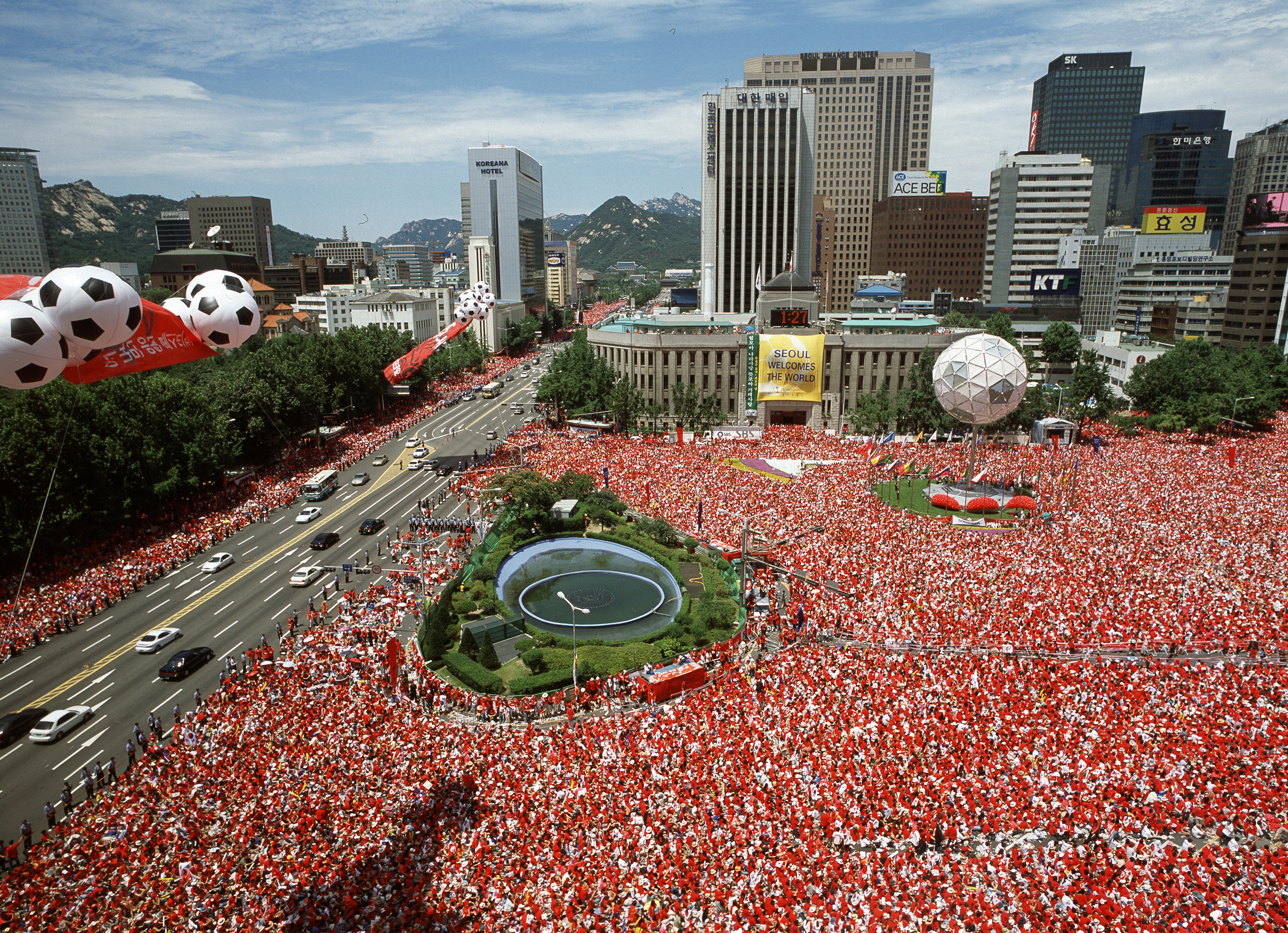
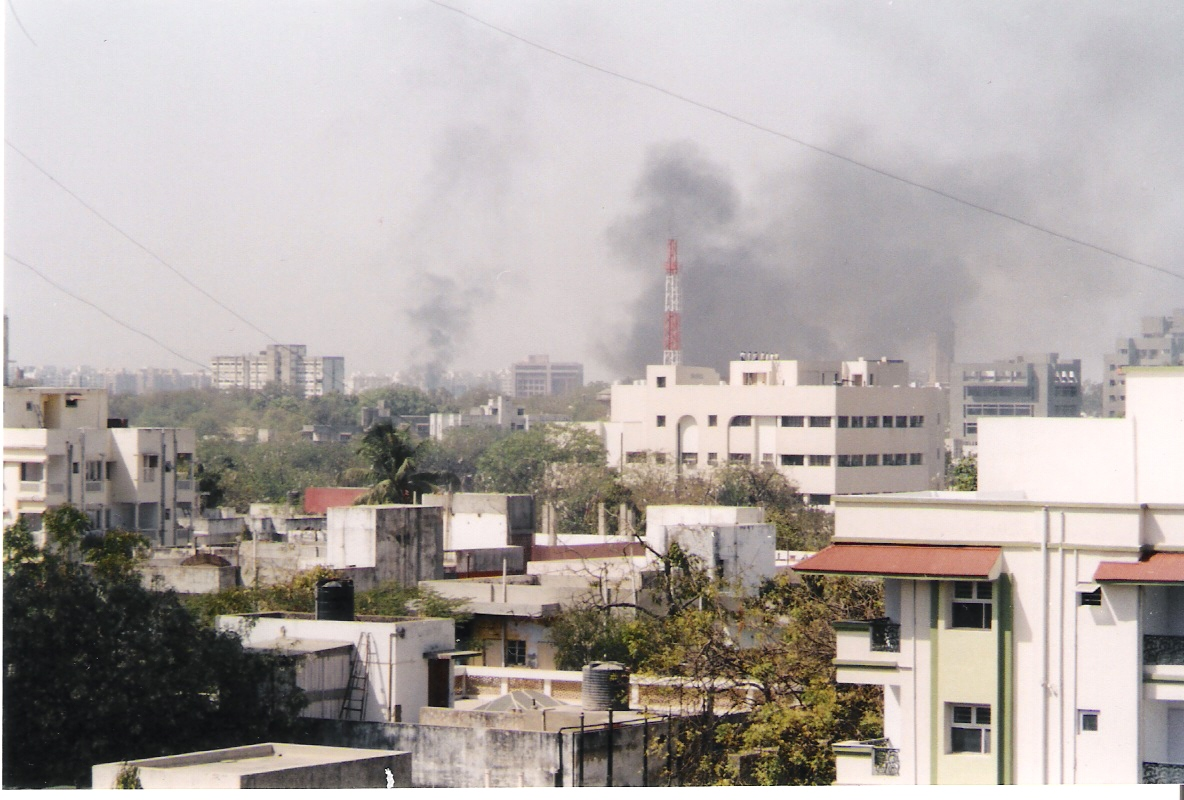
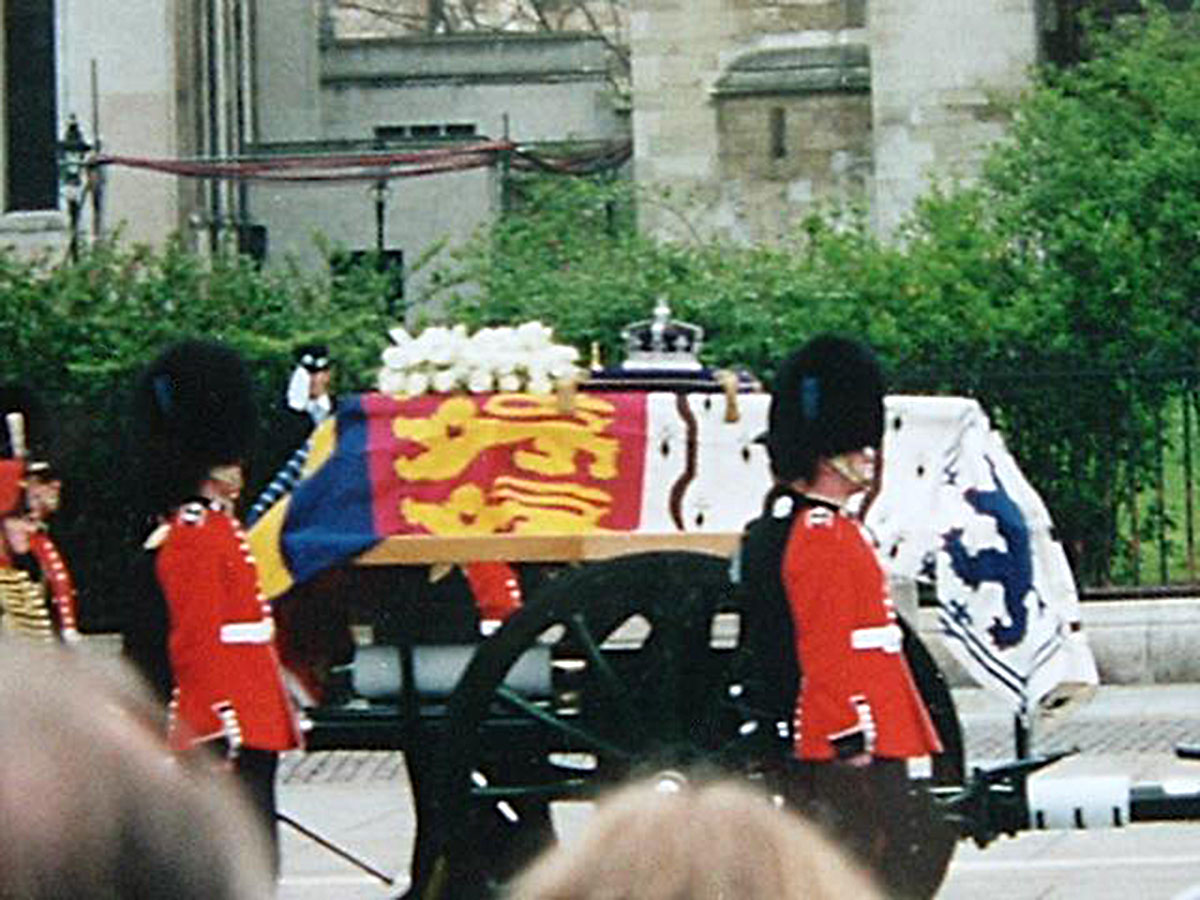
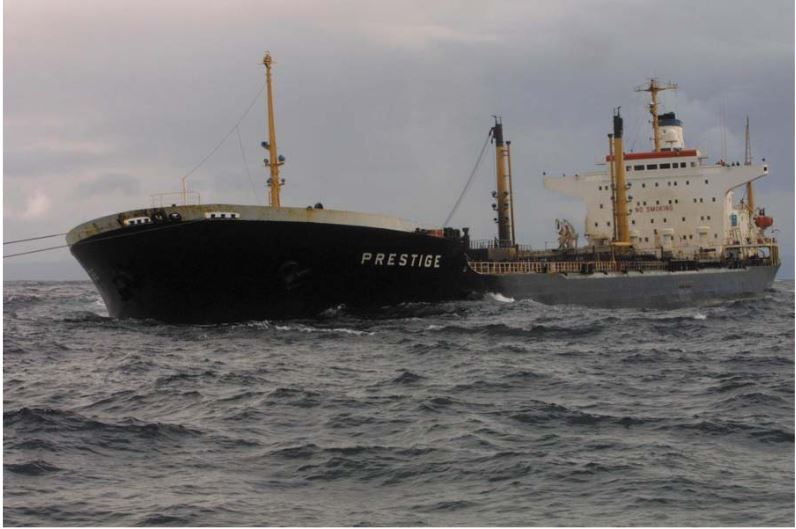
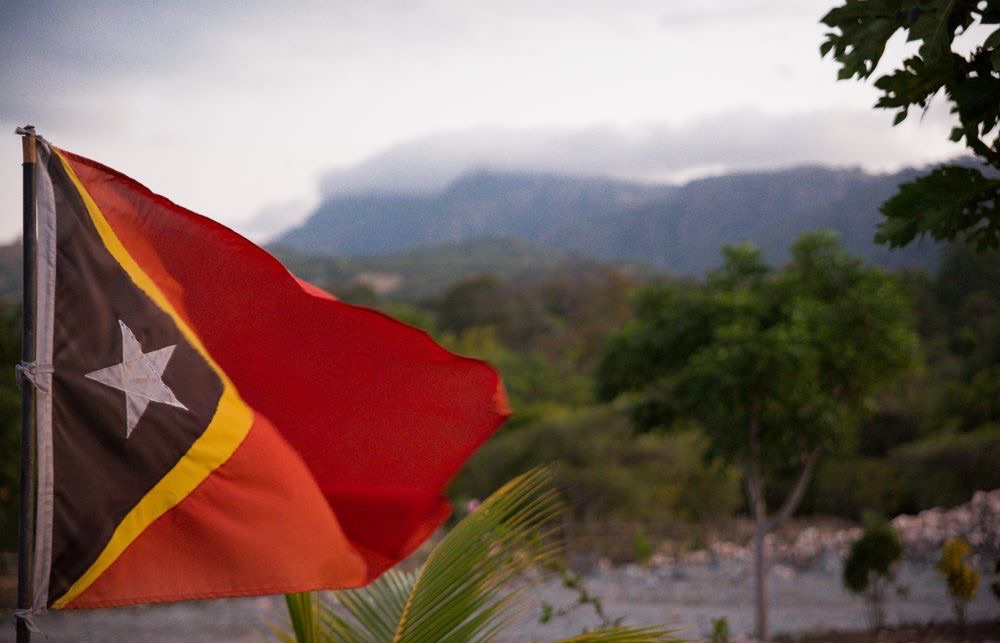
From left to right, top to bottom:
- Memorial for the victims of the 2002 Bali bombings, which killed 202 people;
- Vladimir Putin visiting hospitalized hostages of the Moscow theater hostage crisis, in which 132 of the 912 hostages are killed;
- The 2002 FIFA World Cup is held in South Korea and Japan and was won by Brazil;
- The 2002 European floods kill 232 people;
- The 2002 Gujarat riots began after the train burnings, resulting in 1,000–2,000 deaths;
- Euro coins and banknotes are introduced;
- Queen Elizabeth The Queen Mother dies;
- The Prestige oil spill causes a major environmental disaster in Spain, France, and Portugal;
- East Timor, now known as Timor-Leste, officially gains its independence.

2002 (MMII) was a common year starting on Tuesday of the Gregorian calendar, the 2002nd year of the Common Era (CE) and Anno Domini (AD) designations, the 2nd year of the 3rd millennium and the 21st century, and the 3rd year of the 2000s decade.

The effects of the September 11 attacks of the previous year had a significant impact on the affairs of 2002. The war on terror was a major political focus. Without settled international law, several nations engaged in anti-terror operations, and human rights concerns arose surrounding the treatment of suspected terrorists. Elsewhere, the Colombian conflict and the Nepalese Civil War represented some of the most severe militant conflicts, while the conflict between India and Pakistan was the only one between two sovereign nations. Religious tensions permeated the year, including violence between Hindus and Muslims in India during violent riots and other attacks and attacks on Jews in response to the Second Intifada. The Catholic Church grappled with scrutiny amid sexual abuse cases.

Politics and religion throughout the rest of 2002 is still focused intently on the Muslim world and Islamic terrorism over the September 11 attacks the previous year.

Timor-Leste was established as a new sovereign nation, and the African Union began operating as a new intergovernmental organization. The International Criminal Court was founded in July. The global economy was stagnant as it slowly moved past the early 2000s recession. South America endured an economic crisis, and the telecommunications and information technology industries faced their own economic declines. The Euro was introduced as a new currency at the beginning of the year.

The year 2002 was the second hottest on record at the time. Eruptions of Mount Nyiragongo severely affected surrounding populations in central Africa. The discovery of Quaoar in October challenged the conventional definition of a planet. Small RNA was discovered in 2002, and the human ancestor Sahelanthropus was first described. The Baiji dolphin was declared functionally extinct from the Yangtze River in China.

Norway won the most gold medals in the 2002 Winter Olympics, which were held in Salt Lake City. The popular film franchises Harry Potter and The Lord of the Rings saw continued success, with The Lord of the Rings: The Two Towers becoming the highest-grossing film of the year, while James Bond and Star Wars were less successful than other franchise installments. Pop music lost its popularity in 2002 amid the rise of country and hip-hop, with hip-hop artist Eminem producing the year's most successful album, The Eminem Show.

== Population ==
The world population on January 1, 2002, was estimated to be 6.272 billion people, and it increased to 6.353 billion people by January 1, 2003. An estimated 134.0 million births and 52.5 million deaths took place in 2002. The average global life expectancy was 67.1 years, an increase of 0.3 years from 2001. The number of global refugees was approximately 12 million at the beginning of 2002, but it declined to 10.3 million by the end of the year. Approximately 2.4 million refugees were repatriated in 2002, of which 2 million were Afghan. 293,000 additional refugees were displaced in 2002, primarily from Liberia, the Democratic Republic of the Congo, Burundi, Somalia, Ivory Coast, and the Central African Republic.

== Conflicts ==
There were 31 armed conflicts in 2002 that caused at least 25 fatalities. Five of these resulted in at least 1,000 fatalities: the Burundian Civil War, the Colombian conflict, the Kashmir insurgency, the Nepalese Civil War, and the Second Sudanese Civil War. Among developed nations in 2002, national defense shifted toward counterterrorism after the September 11 attacks and the invasion of Afghanistan the previous year. Conflicts in Afghanistan, Chechnya, Israel, and the Philippines were directly related to countering Islamic terrorism.

=== Internal conflicts ===
The Colombian conflict escalated after far-left insurgents occupied demilitarized zones and kidnapped Íngrid Betancourt, effectively ending peace talks. The insurgents began bombing cities, and over 200,000 Colombians were displaced by the conflict in 2002.

The Nepalese Civil War escalated in 2002, with casualties approximately equaling the combined totals from 1996 to 2001; half of this increase was civilian casualties, as civilians were targeted by both the Nepali government and the communist insurgents. Chechen insurgents in Russia escalated their attacks during the Second Chechen War, destroying a Russian Mil Mi-26 in August and causing a hostage crisis in Moscow. The Second Liberian Civil War also escalated, causing widespread displacement of civilians.

Conflicts that saw some form of resolution in 2002 include the Eelam War III in Sri Lanka, which was halted with a ceasefire agreement in February, and the Angolan Civil War, which was resolved in April with a ceasefire between the Angolan government and UNITA. Internationally brokered peace talks advanced in the Second Sudanese Civil War, some factions of the Somali Civil War, and the Second Congo War, with the latter producing an agreement on December 17 to create a Congolese transitional government. Afghanistan underwent its first year without direct military conflict in over two decades, though sporadic attacks were carried out by the Taliban insurgency and al-Qaeda. An agreement was reached with the government of Burundi and the CNDD-FDD on December 3, but the other major faction in Burundi, the Palipehutu-FNL, did not participate in peace talks.

The largest attack on civilians in 2002 was a series of bombings in Bali that killed or injured hundreds on October 12, with Australian tourists making up a large portion of the victims. Major attacks also took place in Kenya on November 28, bombing Israeli citizens at a hotel and making a failed attempt to shoot down an airplane boarded by Israelis. The Washington D.C. area was the subject of several sniper attacks the same month, killing ten people. Europe underwent a large number of mass shootings throughout the year, including an attack on a town council meeting in France on March 27 that killed eight councilors and a school shooting in Germany on April 26—one of the deadliest in the world with 18 fatalities.

=== International conflicts ===
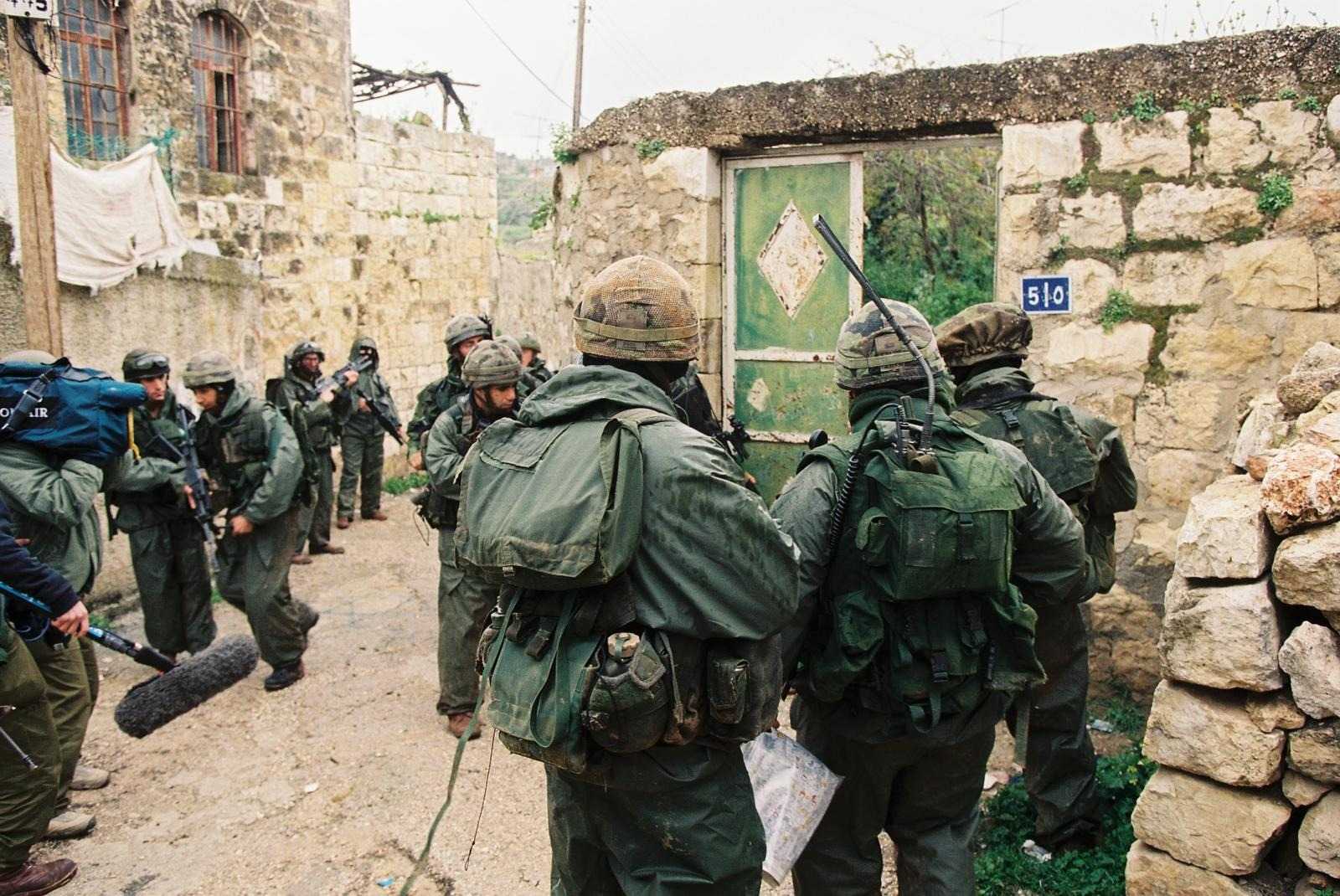
The Israel Defense Forces occupying the West Bank during Operation Defensive Shield

The only direct conflict between nations in 2002 was the India–Pakistan standoff in Kashmir, beginning in late 2001. This conflict was primarily one of brinkmanship, with the threat of nuclear warfare. Riots in Gujarat and suicide bombings in Jammu further escalated tensions. However by June 2002 the conflict had ended.

The Second Intifada continued in 2002 between the Israel Defense Forces and Palestinian paramilitary groups with an escalation in violence. Palestinian suicide bombings became coordinated to maximize the number of civilian casualties, while the Israeli military killed approximately twice as many Palestinians in retaliation. In response to the suicide bombings, Israel carried out Operation Defensive Shield in March. Under this operation, Israel occupied much of West Bank, and it and briefly held Palestinian president Yasser Arafat under house arrest. The Battle of Jenin was particularly destructive, with the United Nations finding both parties to be irresponsible regarding collateral damage.

== Culture ==
=== Art and architecture ===
Construction of the Bibliotheca Alexandrina was completed in 2002.

Economic downturn in the aftermath of the September 11 attacks limited the art industry in 2002. Organizations were less willing to give patronage, and tourists were less willing to visit art exhibitions and museums, particularly in New York and the Middle East. The Documenta11 exhibition took place in Kassel, Germany, contributing to the early movement of art globalization with its focus on experimental and documentary works from developing nations. Traditional visual art was mostly replaced by film and photography at the exhibition. Critically acclaimed paintings in 2002 include The Upper Room, a collection of paintings by Chris Ofili based on a drawing of a monkey by Andy Warhol, and Dispersion, an abstract work by Julie Mehretu.

The rebuilding of the World Trade Center was a major focus in the architectural world, and various exhibitions were held to showcase design concepts. The Tribute in Light was implemented on the site during the interim. Egypt began accepting designs for the Grand Egyptian Museum. New structures constructed or opened in 2002 include the Austrian Cultural Forum in New York, the Imperial War Museum North in Manchester, the Cathedral of Our Lady of the Angels in Los Angeles, and the Bibliotheca Alexandrina in Alexandria. The Bronx Developmental Center in New York and Fallingwater in Pennsylvania were renovated, and the Maslon House was demolished in California.

=== Media ===
==== Popular media ====
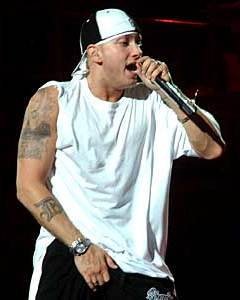
Eminem released the best-selling album of 2002, The Eminem Show.

The highest-grossing film globally in 2002 was The Lord of the Rings: The Two Towers, followed by Harry Potter and the Chamber of Secrets and Spider-Man. The highest-grossing non-English film was Hero (Mandarin), the 28th highest-grossing film of the year. Film was marked by several unexpected successes and failures in 2002, including the underwhelming performances of the Star Wars film Attack of the Clones, the James Bond film Die Another Day, and the Disney film Treasure Planet, as well as the word-of-mouth success of My Big Fat Greek Wedding. Critically acclaimed films from 2002 include Adaptation, Far from Heaven, and Talk to Her.

Music sales in 2002 amounted to about 3 billion units, a decline of 8% from 2001. CD albums remained the dominant form of music, making up 89% of the market. DVD music sales increased by 40%, while cassette tape music sales decreased by 36%. Pop music saw a major decline in 2002 as it was overtaken by country and hip-hop. Globally, the best-selling albums in 2002 were The Eminem Show by Eminem, followed by Let Go by Avril Lavigne and the Elvis Presley greatest hits album ELV1S: 30 #1 Hits. The best-selling non-English album was Mensch (transl. Human) by German singer Herbert Grönemeyer, the 29th best-selling album overall.

Sony and Microsoft introduced online gaming services for the PlayStation 2 and Xbox consoles, respectively. Critically acclaimed video games released in 2002 include Eternal Darkness, Grand Theft Auto: Vice City, Metroid Prime, Metroid Fusion, and Super Mario Sunshine. Medal of Honor: Allied Assault was influential in the war-based first-person shooter genre with its portrayal of grand cinematic battles. 2002 was the final year of traditional survival horror before it was overtaken by action-based survival horror games in franchises such as Resident Evil.

==== Libraries, press, and radio ====
Costa Rica was celebrated for an advance in free speech when it abolished criminal penalties for insulting public officials. Radio in India became more popular in 2002 following deregulation, with five major stations in Mumbai breaking the state monopoly in April and with significant increases in the sales of car and pocket radios. Good Morning Afghanistan began airing to provide the Afghan people real-time updates on the nation's political situation, while Radio Liberty was expelled from Russia in October. An expected recovery of the newspaper industry did not materialize in 2002 as digital media became more common, resulting in significant cutbacks. The magazine industry faced similar challenges, as well as a separate controversy when the February 11 issue of Newsweek International was banned throughout the Muslim world for its depiction of Muhammed.

The British Library digitized a 700-year-old edition of the Quran, and the U.S. Library of Congress made high resolution scans of a Gutenberg Bible for closer study of Gutenberg's printing methods. Library services faced multiple disruptions in 2002. Strikes by librarians affected operations in both the United Kingdom and the United States, while funding shortages led to cutbacks in Germany, South Africa, and the United States.

=== Sports ===
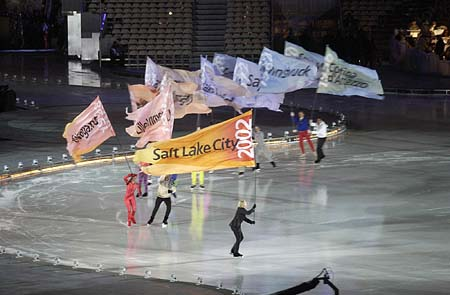
The 2002 Winter Olympics were held in Salt Lake City.

The 2002 Winter Olympics were held in Salt Lake City, with Norway winning the most gold medals. Allegations that a judge was bribed to favor Russia in a figure skating event led to Canada and Russia both receiving gold medals in the event. The 2002 Commonwealth Games were held in Manchester. The 2002 FIFA World Cup was held in Japan and South Korea, and it ended with a 2–0 victory by Brazil over Germany. The traditionally well-performing teams of Argentina, France, and Italy did not meet expectations, while Senegal, South Korea, Turkey, and the United States performed better than they had historically.

Michael Schumacher significantly exceeded his competition and set numerous records with the Ferrari F2002 during the 2002 Formula One World Championship, prompting the Fédération Internationale de l'Automobile to make several rule changes; this included reforms for team orders following a controversial move at the 2002 Austrian Grand Prix in which Schumacher's teammate Rubens Barrichello moved aside to let him win. In boxing, the Lennox Lewis vs. Mike Tyson was preceded by a scuffle during a press conference. Lennox Lewis went on to defeat Mike Tyson. Tennis was widely covered in 2002 when three of the four Grand Slam tournaments ended with Serena Williams defeating her sister Venus Williams in the finals. In American football, the Tuck Rule Game between the New England Patriots and the Oakland Raiders became a national controversy after officials cited the obscure tuck rule to challenge a pass by Tom Brady. The New Zealand All Blacks received wide attention in rugby union for its victory in the 2002 Tri Nations Series, making a comeback performance following its losses in previous years. Bruno Peyron set the record for the fastest circumnavigation by sailing in 2002, making the trip in 64 days.

== Economy ==
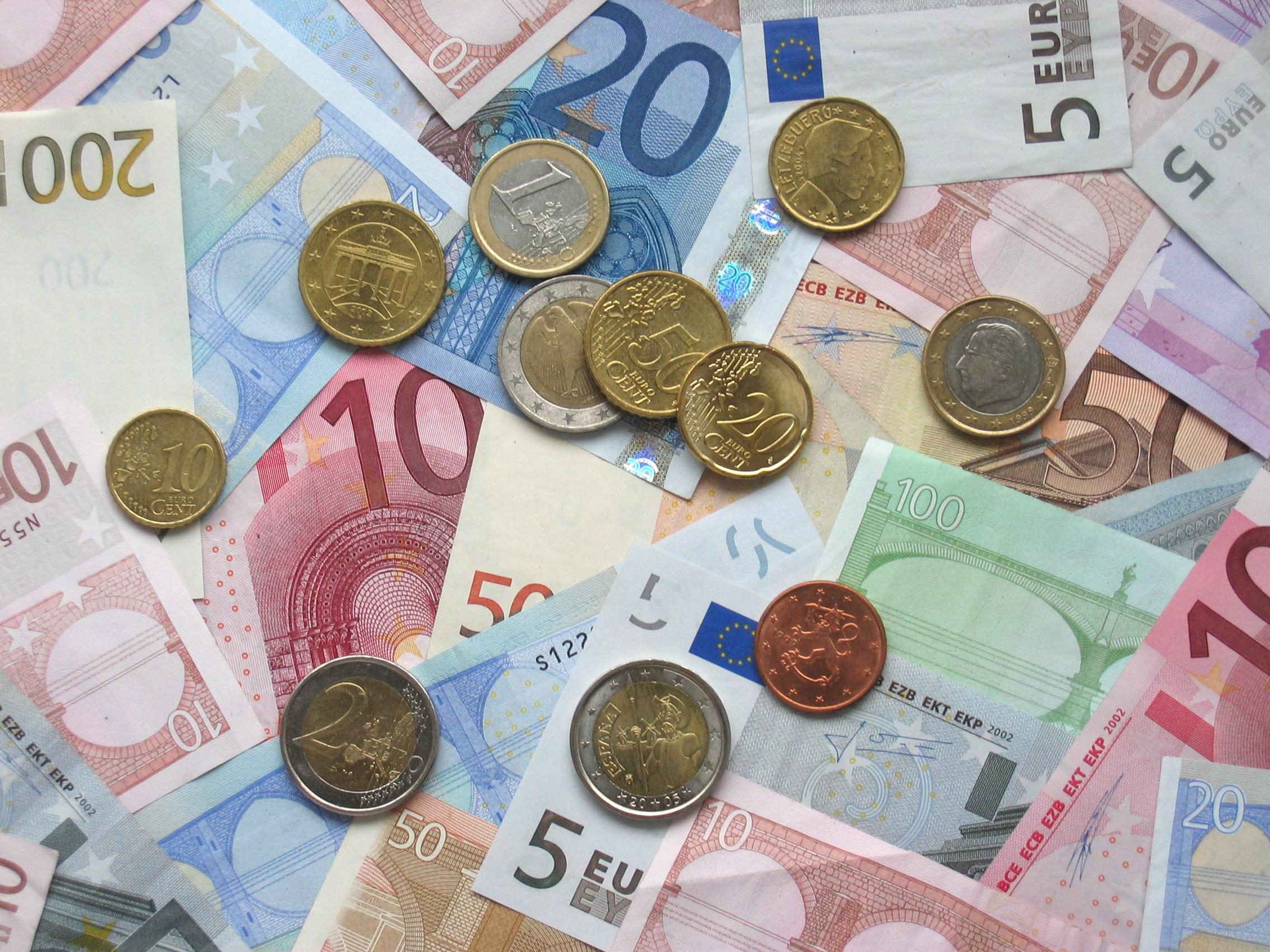
The Euro became the official currency of the European Union on January 1, 2002.

International trade increased by 1.9% in 2002, recovering from a decrease in 2001. Most countries experienced only limited growth of output and employment in the year, and economic policy within the largest economies focused primarily on combating inflation. The gross world product increased by 1.7%, the second lowest growth in a decade after that of 2001. Most developed nations began 2002 in a budget surplus and ended in a deficit. The Euro, a single official currency for the nations of the European Union, was introduced on January 1.

The early 2000s recession began to stabilize in the final months of the year. Growth was focused in the first half of the year before tapering in the second half as stock markets entered into a downturn. By October, global equities saw a 24% decrease in 2002. Particularly affected was AOL-Time Warner, with its stocks losing 65% of their value by the fall. The information technology industry in particular saw major decline in 2002 before it began its recovery from the dot-com crash that had previously affected it. The telecommunications industry was affected even more severely.

The price drops associated with the September 11 attacks persisted for several months into 2002. Apprehensions about potential military conflict in Iraq also limited growth. Latin American economies with large deficits were severely affected by lower prices, limiting export growth and preventing capital from entering the region, requiring further increases to the deficit. The region overall saw a negative GDP in 2002. Imports grew significantly in East Asia, with China competing with the United States as one of the largest export markets for other countries in the region. Imports in Latin America and Africa decreased compared to the previous year.

The United States recovered in part from the recession that had affected the Western world, while Europe's recovery was more limited. South America saw significant economic challenges: Argentina's economic crisis continued from 2001, Brazil had low confidence in its economy, and Venezuela's economy suffered amid political upheaval. Unlike the Western world, Eastern Europe and Asia showed strong growth in 2002. Africa did not share this growth, as it also experienced a weak economy during the year.

Several companies, predominantly in the United States, underwent major scandals in 2002. These included the WorldCom scandal that led to what was then the largest bankruptcy in American history, and accounting scandals emerging from the previous year's Enron scandal. Xerox and the French company Vivendi were found to be reporting artificially inflated profits. Others incidents included the ImClone stock trading case and fraud cases at Adelphia and Tyco. These scandals brought the arrests of several high-profile executives, negatively affected public trust in corporate accounting, and increased the volatility of global stock markets.

== Environment and weather ==
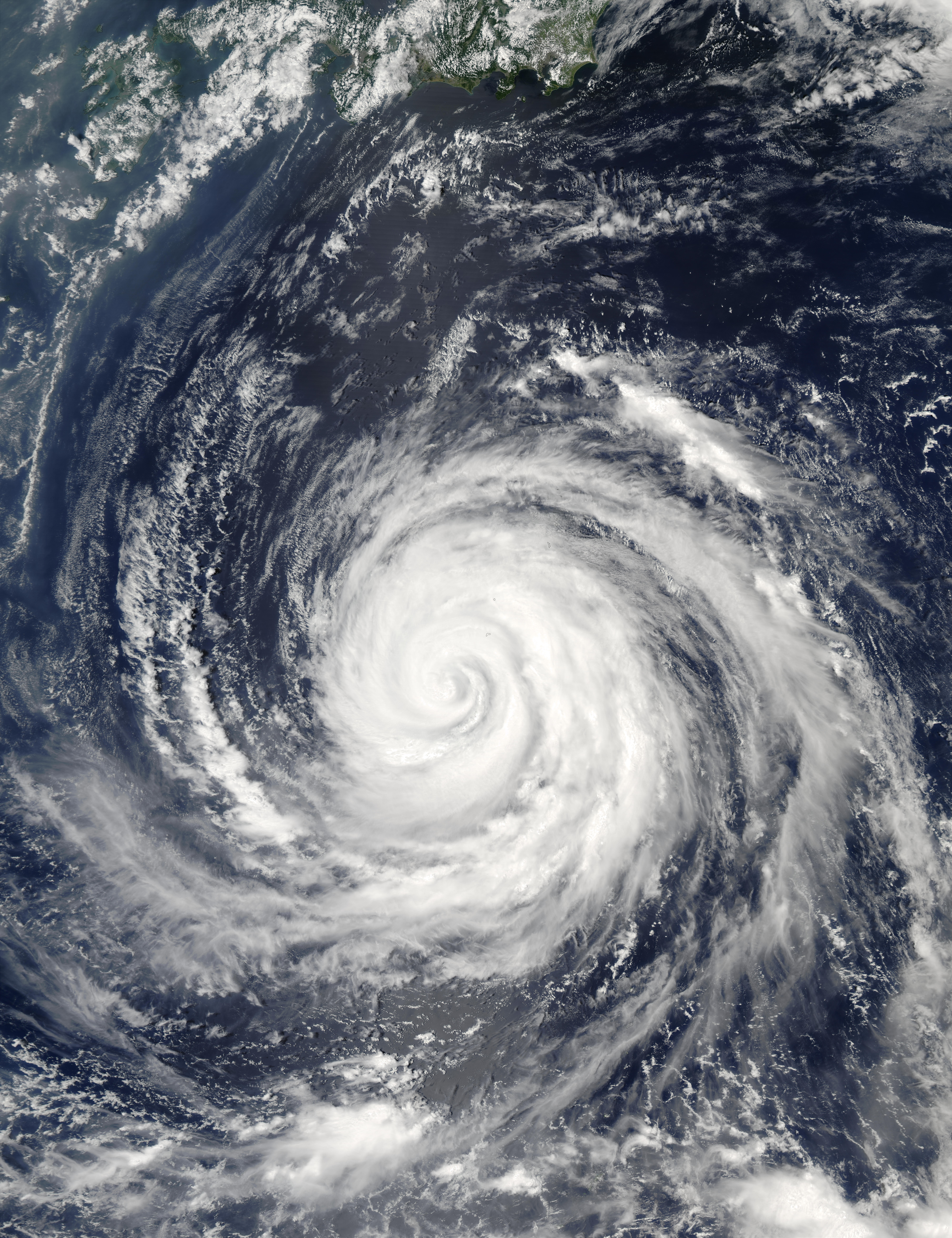
Typhoon Rusa on August 27

2002 was the second hottest year on record, exceeded only by 1998. There was below average precipitation in 2002, with droughts in Australia, northern China, India, and Western United States. Heavy rains in late 2002 caused significant flooding in eastern Asia and in central Europe. The effects of the Asian brown cloud were documented in August by the United Nations Environment Programme, warning of severe agricultural and meteorological effects in Afghanistan, northwestern India, and Pakistan. February saw the collapse of the Larsen B ice shelf, a 12,000-year-old ice shelf in Antarctica with an area of 3,265 km^{2} (1,260 sq mi).

The third Global Environment Outlook report was published in May. The World Summit on Sustainable Development was held in Johannesburg beginning on August 26. A number of proposals were endorsed in the summit, though environmentalists criticized the United States for not supporting stronger measures. The European Union ratified the Kyoto Protocol, while China and Russia announced their intent to do so. Australia and the United States rejected the protocol. The war in Afghanistan caused widespread environmental issues, with forests destroyed, wildlife poached by refugees, and the Kabul Zoo requiring international support. Kitulo National Park was established in Tanzania to preserve the endemic orchid species.

Efforts to promote carbon sequestration were mixed in 2002. An experiment to study whether there were risks of pollution was shuttered following pressure from environmentalist groups such as Greenpeace and the World Wide Fund for Nature, but Statoil reported success in a six-year-long experiment in the North Sea later in the year.

The January eruption of Mount Nyiragongo brought destruction to Goma, prompting an evacuation of 400,000 people, with 12,000 finding themselves homeless with damage across 14 villages. A major oil spill took place off the coast of Galicia, Spain, when the MV Prestige ruptured and sank in November. The deadliest earthquake in 2002 was a 6.1-magnitude earthquake that struck northern Afghanistan on March 25, killing approximately 1,000 people. A 6.5 magnitude earthquake in Iran killed approximately 200 people the following June. North America saw one of its most intense earthquakes when a 7.9 magnitude earthquake struck Alaska on November 3, but the remote location prevented any fatalities.

The 2002 Atlantic hurricane season saw 12 named storms, a near-average number. Most of them were relatively minor, with only 4 four becoming hurricanes, of which two attained major hurricane status. The season's activity was limited to between July and October, a rare occurrence caused partly by El Niño conditions. The two major hurricanes, Hurricane Isidore and Hurricane Lili, both made landfall in Cuba and the United States, and combined were responsible for most of the season's damages and deaths. The 2002 Pacific typhoon season entailed a typical number of typhoons, but they were above average in intensity with 46% of typhoons reaching "intense strength". Typhoon Rusa killed at least 113 people in South Korea, making it the nation's deadliest typhoon in 43 years.

== Health ==
The World Health Organization (WHO) recognized "reducing risks" and "promoting healthy life" as its health concern of focus in the 2002 World Health Report. Global food supplies reduced in 2002 amid droughts and drops in harvest yields. Famines occurred in Ethiopia, Malawi, Zambia, and Zimbabwe. Eritrea, Lesotho, Mozambique, and Swaziland were also heavily affected by insufficient food. The fishing industry was not affected, increasing slightly from previous years. Nigeria and the Philippines took steps toward establishing national healthcare systems.

A 2001 Ebola outbreak in Gabon and the Republic of the Congo continued through 2002. The United States and the Dutch company Crucell collaborated to begin development on an Ebola vaccine in response. The year's increased focus on terrorism, particularly after the 2001 anthrax attacks, prompted many countries to invest in vaccines, antibiotics, and antivirals as a precaution against bioterrorism. Renewed attention was brought to the case of family doctor Harold Shipman when it was announced in July that he had killed 200 other people under his care beyond the 15 for which he was prosecuted.

== Politics and law ==
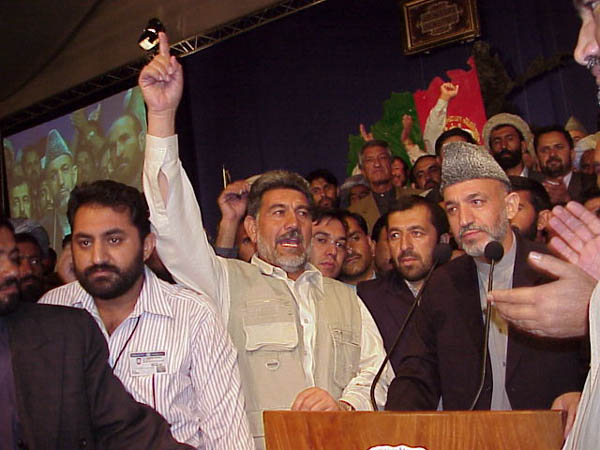
Hamid Karzai (right) is elected president of Afghanistan

East Timor became a sovereign nation in 2002. It was one of two nations, along with Switzerland, to join the United Nations in September. Brazil, Lesotho, and Senegal established democracy in 2002 through the acceptance of fair elections, while Bahrain and Kenya moved toward democracy through the strengthening of political institutions. Democracy was disestablished in Ivory Coast and Togo following mass political violence and unfair elections, respectively.

The United States was not reelected to its membership on the United Nations Commission on Human Rights for the first time. Afghanistan underwent significant liberalization under a transitional government following end of major fighting in the War in Afghanistan, particularly in the capital of Kabul, though distant regions of the country remained oppressed by warlords. Civil rights also increased following the end of conflicts in Angola, Bosnia and Herzegovina, and Macedonia. Turkey lessened its restrictions on the country's Kurdish population in 2002. The majority of Gibraltar's population engaged in protests when the British government considered delivering partial control of the territory to Spain; this culminated with a referendum that rejected the move.

The Chinese Communist Party chose Hu Jintao as its next leader in a November meeting. The African Union formally came into existence in July. The United Kingdom held a Golden Jubilee celebration for Queen Elizabeth II, marking fifty years as the monarch. In Latin America, the great depression in Argentina continued into 2002, causing significant political turmoil. Venezuela also underwent political crisis with an attempted coup against President Hugo Chávez in April and a national strike against his administration later in the year. Brazil elected the leftist president Luiz Inácio Lula da Silva in response to the economic instability.

NATO established a diplomatic relationship with Russia through the NATO-Russia Council in May, and NATO announced seven new members in November: Bulgaria, Estonia, Latvia, Lithuania, Romania, Slovakia, and Slovenia. This expansion meant that NATO countries bordered Russia for the first time. Russia and the United States signed the Strategic Offensive Reductions Treaty nuclear disarmament agreement in May, but the United States left the Anti-Ballistic Missile Treaty the following month, and Russia then left the START II treaty. The International Code of Conduct against Ballistic Missile Proliferation was signed by over 90 countries in November.

A wave of social pension reform took place in European nations, where Finland, France, Greece, Hungary, Lithuania, Russia, Slovakia, Spain, were all in various phases of implementation. Similar reforms occurred in Japan and Singapore. Anti-globalization protests took place during the September World Bank–IMF meeting in Washington, D.C.

=== Crime and international law ===
The Rome Statute entered into force in July, establishing the International Criminal Court. The International Court of Justice ruled in three cases: it ruled that diplomatic immunity applied to all crimes, including crimes against humanity, and it settled two territorial disputes, ruling in favor of Cameroon over Nigeria and in favor of Malaysia over Indonesia. A lesser court was established by the United Nations in Sierra Leone to prosecute figures associated with the nation's civil war. A ban on the use of child soldiers was established in international law in February.

The prosecution of former Yugoslavian president Slobodan Milošević began in February, but it was delayed and the genocide portion of the charges against him was dropped. Biljana Plavšić, the former president of Republika Srpska, plead guilty to crimes against humanity in a related case. In August, the International Criminal Tribunal for Rwanda saw the arrests of nine more people accused of genocide, including army chief of staff Augustin Bizimungu. Efforts failed to create a similar tribunal in Cambodia to prosecute Khmer Rouge. United Nations peacekeeping missions concluded in Bosnia and Herzegovina and in Prevlaka, reducing its Balkan presence to Kosovo.

Former military dictator of Argentina Leopoldo Galtieri was arrested in July for his actions in the Dirty War. Two generals from the Salvadoran Civil War were found liable for torture in an American court, and they were ordered to pay $54.6 million in damages. A major espionage case in the United States ended in May with Robert Hanssen sentenced to life in prison for spying on behalf of the Soviet Union. Serbia and Montenegro abolished capital punishment to qualify for entry to the Council of Europe, and Turkey did so to garner support for its incorporation into the European Union. Prisoners in Sri Lanka, Thailand, and Turkey engaged in deadly strikes and riots in response to poor conditions in 2002.

=== War on terror ===
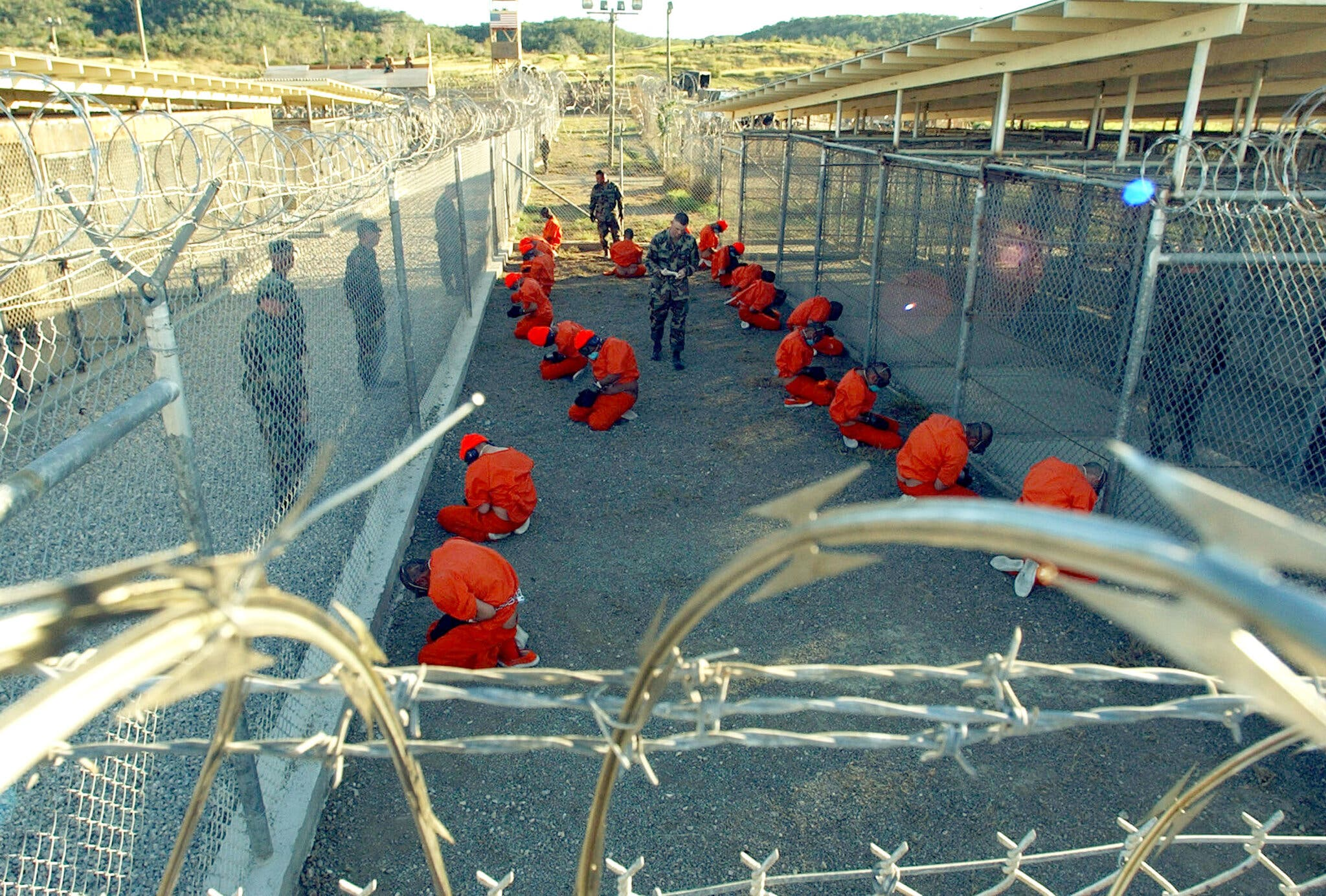
The first inmates arrive at Camp X-Ray in the Guantanamo Bay detention camp.

Terrorism dominated politics internationally in 2002, with both terrorist acts and attempts to declare groups as terrorist organizations being prevalent throughout the year. Islamic terrorism was widely seen as responsible for terrorist attacks throughout the year. In response, the United States began providing military assistance against terrorists in several countries as part of Operation Enduring Freedom. International law regarding these actions had yet to be settled, and international organizations spent the year debating how action against terrorist groups should be carried out.

Pakistan arrested al-Qaeda operative Ramzi bin al-Shibh in September on suspicions of involvement in the September 11 attacks and extradited him to the United States. The United States arrested an addition fifteen suspects across several states for involvement in the preparation of future terrorist attacks. Anti-terrorism actions by the United States, including the arbitrary arrest and deportation of non-citizens and indefinite detention of suspected terrorists captured in Afghanistan, were condemned as human rights violations. American treatment of prisoners in the war on terror came under scrutiny, particularly in Camp X-Ray in the Guantanamo Bay detention camp. China and Russia invoked anti-terrorism to take actions against their Uyghur and Chechen minorities, respectively.

Australia, Russia, and the United States all declared a right to preemptive strikes against foreign terrorist groups in 2002. George W. Bush defined an "axis of evil" in an address in January, naming Iran, Iraq, and North Korea as foreign adversaries of the United States. Increasing tensions between Iraq and the United States became a major geopolitical issue in 2002 amid suspicions that Iraq had resumed its production of weapons of mass destruction. The United Nations delivered an ultimatum for Iraq to comply with weapons inspections in late 2002. Because of this dispute, as well Hussein's involvement with terrorist groups amid the war on terror, an invasion of Iraq by the United States was widely expected.

== Religion ==
Religious violence was prevalent in 2002. Hindu–Muslim relations were strained in India, most prominently by an attack on a Hindu train car in February that led to weeks of deadly riots in Gujarat. Unrest from the Second Intifada led to widespread attacks on Jews throughout the world, and Christians in Pakistan faced several attacks throughout the year.

The Catholic Church sexual abuse scandal continued from 2001; the church adopted rules on how to address sexual abuse allegations on January 8, and Pope John Paul II made his second papal statement on the matter on March 22. The Catholic Church created four new Russian dioceses in February, resulting in protests by members of the Russian Orthodox Church. Belarus made the Belarusian Orthodox Church into the state's legally recognized religion, curtailing practice of other religions. The Church of England determined in July that divorcees could marry in the church. Then in December, the church saw its first leader in centuries from outside its own membership when the Welsh Rowan Williams was confirmed as Archbishop of Canterbury.

Islam grappled with the aftermath of the September 11 attacks in 2002, facing both the expansion of Islamic terrorism and of United States military action in combating it. Orthodox Judaism was the subject of several disputes with the Israeli government throughout the year, including the exemption of Orthodox Jews from military service and recognition of non-Orthodox conversions in the population registry.

The relationship between religion and education shifted in several nations in 2002. The removal of the Taliban from power allowed girls to attend school in Afghanistan for the first time, and textbooks funded by the United States included images of women. Pakistan introduced a law to regulate Islamic madrasa schools under pressure from Western nations, but it saw backlash from the schools. State-funded faith schools became a polarizing issue when the government suggested increasing their number. The Supreme Court of the United States ruled that school vouchers allowed students to seek religious education.

== Science ==
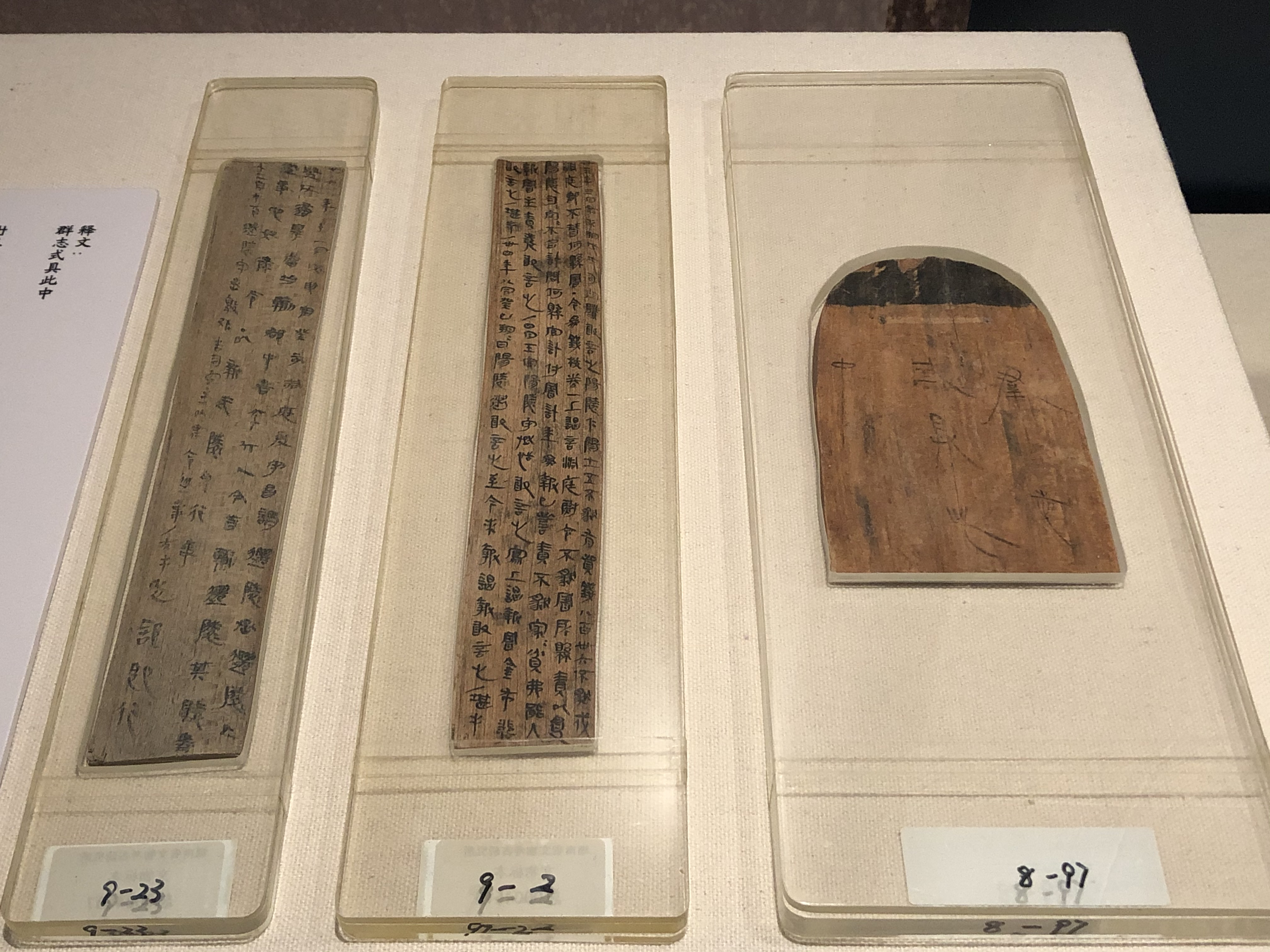
The Liye Qin Slips were discovered by archaeologists in 2002.

Archaeological finds in 2002 included the alleged ossuary of James, brother of Jesus; red ochre cave art in the Blombos Cave in South Africa, created approximately 77,000 years ago and the oldest known artwork; the largest Etruscan civilization settlement found to date, from approximately 2,600 years ago; a collection of bamboo slips featuring 200,000 characters of calligraphy from the Qin dynasty; two stone slabs featuring the Indian emperor Ashoka; ancient irrigation canals under Tucson, Arizona; a Mayan mural in San Bartolo, Guatemala; an Aztec shrine on Pico de Orizaba in Mexico; and the Palace of Parliament of Upper Canada that had been destroyed in the War of 1812. A major study published in 2002 provided evidence against the Black Sea deluge hypothesis that had been popularized in 1996. The Egyptian Museum held an exhibition for artifacts from the tomb of Tutankhamun, including some items never seen by the public.

Chemists in 2002 bonded uranium to noble gases for the first time, observed a blackberry-shaped molecular structure in molybdenum blue, fluorinated carbon nanotubes, synthesized a stable cyclopentadienyl cation, discovered the oxidation-resistant gold Au_{55}, incorporated a photonic lattice into a tungsten filament, invented the ITQ-21 zeolite to more efficiently refine petroleum, and developed a method to create crystalline oxide film without extreme heat. A team led by Rüdeger Köhler developed a laser that emits terahertz radiation. Early study of Bose–Einstein condensates continued in 2002, as did that of quantum dots. A major study into antimatter across 70 institutions took place in 2002 with results suggesting that antimatter may not be a precise opposite of matter.

The discovery of a large trans-Neptunian object, Quaoar, prompted reconsideration of how to define a planet, including doubts about whether Pluto should be considered a planet. Study with the Cosmic Background Imager revealed a more detailed image of cosmic background radiation, and telescopes were able to counteract the scattering effect of Earth's atmosphere through adaptive optics. The largest known volcanic eruption in the Solar System was discovered on the moon Io in November 2002, using imaging that had been taken in February 2001. The youngest known pulsar was discovered in 2002, originating from a supernova documented in 1181.

Two major breakthroughs were made in number theory in 2002: Manindra Agrawal led a team in developing the AKS primality test, and Preda Mihăilescu created a proof for the 150-year-old Catalan's conjecture.

The September 11 attacks of the previous year caused a shift in focus among cultural anthropologists in 2002 toward the study of violence in society.

=== Biology ===
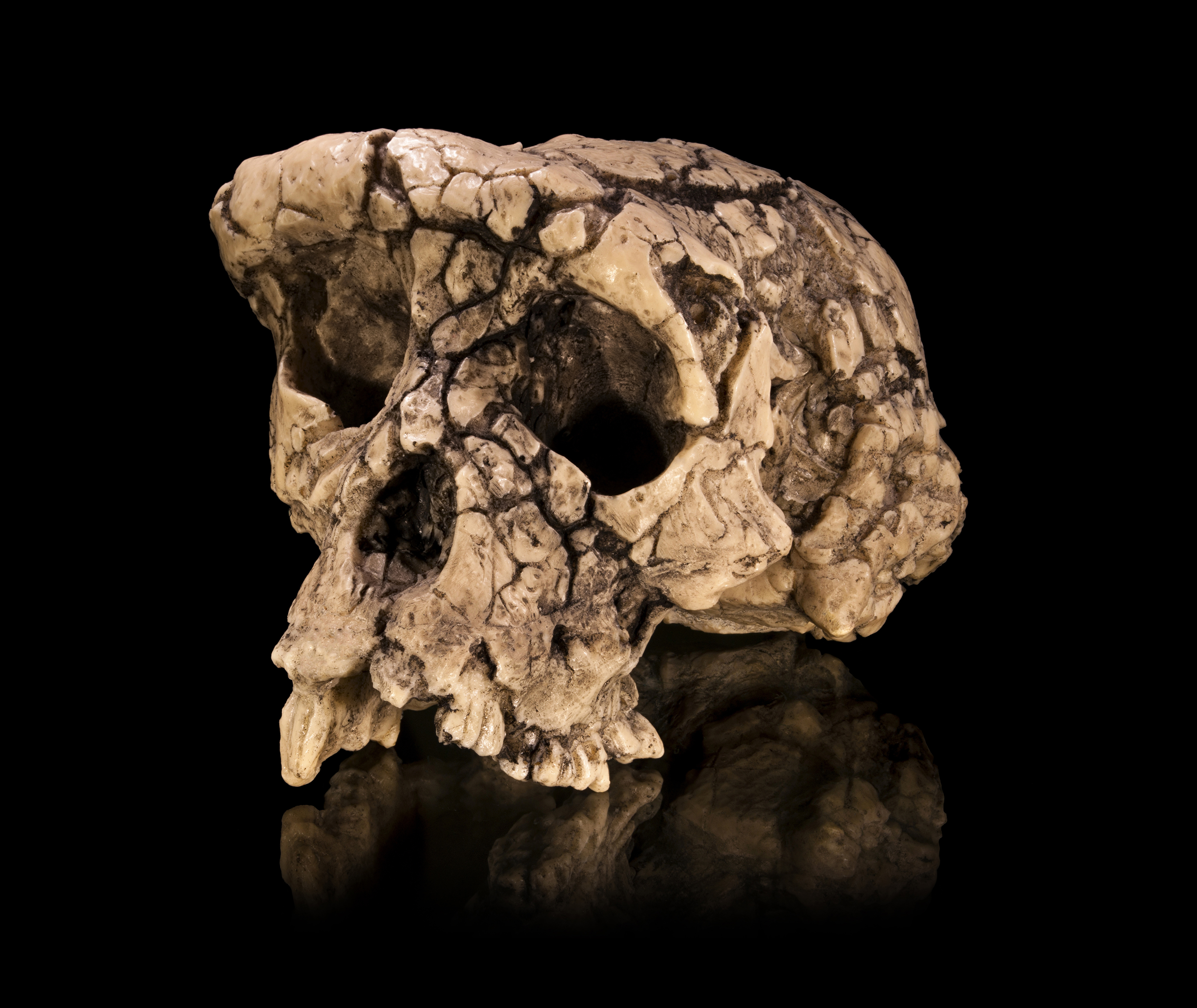
The discovery of the Toumaï fossil (pictured) led to the discovery of Sahelanthropus.

New species of animals described in 2002 include the rupicolous gerbil, the lesser Congo shrew, and the bald parrot. The rediscovery of Bavarian pine voles was announced in Austria after being thought extinct in the 1960s. Several paleological discoveries in China strong evidence supporting a relation between theropods and birds. The hominid ancestor Sahelanthropus was identified in 2002 from fossils found in Chad. A new genus of conifer in Vietnam, Xanthocyparis, was described.

Genome sequences were completed for indica rice and for the malaria carriers anopheles gambiae and plasmodium falciparum. Scientists at the San Diego Zoo successfully created cloned egg cells for the endangered banteng by applying its DNA to egg cells from cows. Scientists in the United States announced in July that they had reconstructed a poliovirus specimen using its genetic sequence.

Two experiments in 2002 were successful in producing plants from old seeds: a lotus plant was grown from a 500-year-old seed, and two other plants were grown after their seeds were bottled and laid dormant since 1879. A new herbicide was discovered by extracting the catechin toxin of the spotted knapweed. Controversy about genetically modified crops increased when it was discovered that pest-resistant genes can be transferred to weeds and that crops resistant to some pests can become more vulnerable to others.

Other biology developments from 2002 include an understanding of TRP channels in taste, the role of light in a circadian rhythm, and the development of 3D imagery of cells. Major advances in the development and application of stem cells triggered an ethics debate that defined the field, in part because stem cells were commonly developed from the human fetus. Study of hormones led to the identification of two related to appetite: ghrelin to encourage eating and peptide YY to discourage it.

=== Technology ===
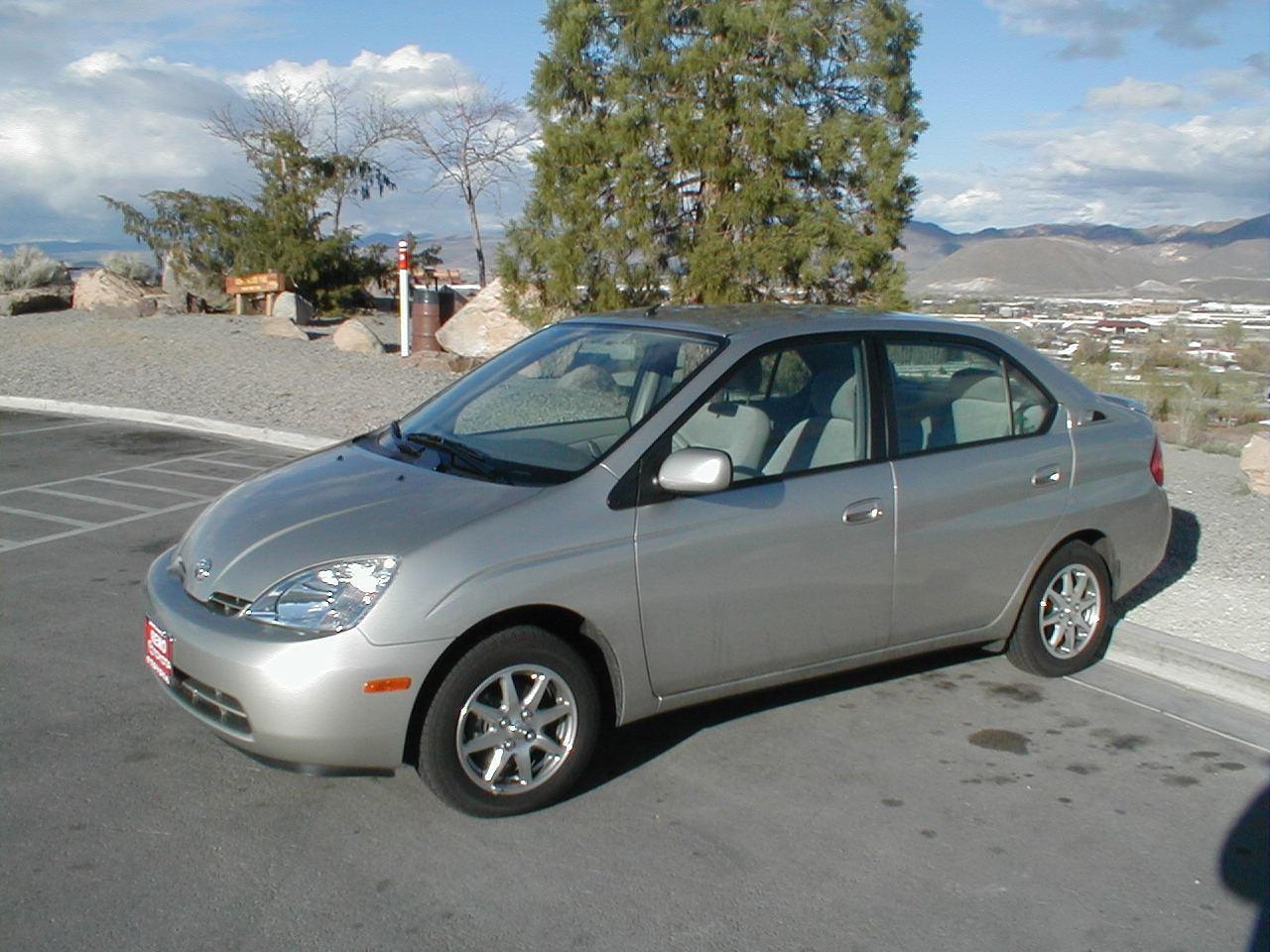
A 2002 Toyota Prius

There were 61 successful and four failed space launches in 2002. NASA launches included the Reuven Ramaty High Energy Solar Spectroscopic Imager, the Aqua research satellite, and a Polar Operational Environmental Satellite. The CONTOUR probe was put into orbit on July 3 but lost when activated on August 15. The European Space Agency launched the Meteosat 8 satellite in August and the INTEGRAL observatory in October. It also saw the launch of the Envisat satellite. China launched the Shenzhou 3 and Shenzhou 4 missions in March and December, respectively. Russia sent the second ever space tourist, Mark Shuttleworth, into space. The creation of the International Space Station remained the largest focus of global space programs, but its development was halted for several months after potentially deadly cracks were found on several space shuttles.

The open-source-software movement saw growth throughout the year, in part because of Microsoft's success in avoiding tighter regulations in court. China blocked Google Search and AltaVista in August, provoking a hacktivist movement in the United States that worked to circumvent such restrictions in authoritarian nations. Some parts of Google were restored on September 12. New developments in peer-to-peer sharing allowed decentralized file sharing between computers, causing a proliferation of online piracy. Blogging also became a common practice in 2002. Klez was a computer worm that spread extensively in 2002 before public awareness limited its effectiveness. Hybrid vehicles first saw widespread popularity in 2002.

== Events ==
=== January ===
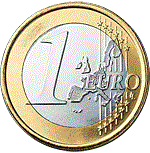
1 euro coin

- January – Operation Enduring Freedom – Philippines: The Philippines and the United States begin a joint operation to combat Jihadist groups in the Philippines.
- January 1 – The Euro is introduced as the official physical currency in the Eurozone countries. The first physical transactions are carried out on Réunion. The former currencies of all the countries that use the Euro cease to be legal tender on February 28.
- January 6 – The Boston Globe publishes results of an investigation leading to the criminal prosecutions of five Roman Catholic priests and bringing widespread attention to the sexual abuse of minors by Catholic clergy.
- January 16 – The United Nations and Sierra Leone create a joint Special Court for Sierra Leone to prosecute the Revolutionary United Front.
- January 17 – Mount Nyiragongo erupts in the Democratic Republic of the Congo, displacing an estimated 400,000 people.
- January 18 – The Sierra Leone Civil War comes to a conclusion with the defeat of the Revolutionary United Front by government forces.
- January 19 – In American football, Tom Brady's victory in the Tuck Rule Game causes a national controversy.
- January 29 – American president George W. Bush defines an axis of evil consisting of Iran, Iraq, and North Korea in his State of the Union Address.

=== February ===
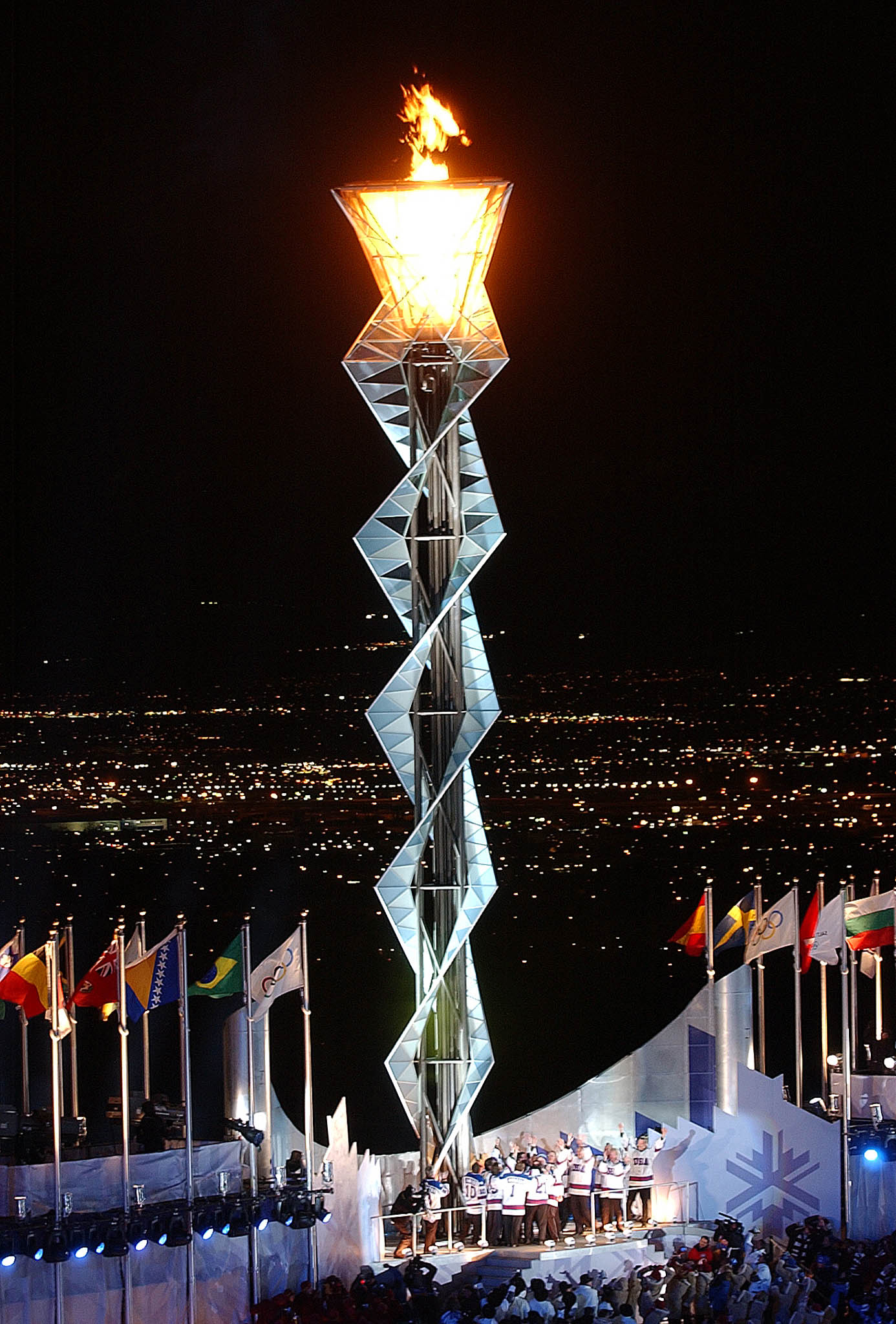
The Olympic flame during the 2002 Winter Olympics

- February 3 – 2002 Afyon earthquake: A 6.0 magnitude earthquake strikes Afyonkarahisar Province, Turkey, killing 41 people and damaging thousands of buildings.
- February 5 – NASA launches the Reuven Ramaty High Energy Solar Spectroscopic Imager as part of the Explorers Program.
- February 8–24 – The 2002 Winter Olympics are held in Salt Lake City, Utah.
- February 11
  - Several Muslim-majority nations ban an issue of Newsweek International when it depicts Muhammad.
  - The Catholic Church establishes four new dioceses in Russia, prompting backlash from the Russian Orthodox Church.
- February 12
  - The trial of Slobodan Milošević, the former president of Yugoslavia, begins at the International Criminal Tribunal for the former Yugoslavia in The Hague.
  - The Optional Protocol on the Involvement of Children in Armed Conflict comes into effect, establishing an international agreement against the use of child soldiers.
- February 14
  - The State of Bahrain is declared a constitutional monarchy and becomes the Kingdom of Bahrain.
  - The International Court of Justice rules in favor of the Democratic Republic of the Congo in the Arrest Warrant of 11 April 2000 case.
- February 19 – NASA's 2001 Mars Odyssey space probe begins to map the surface of Mars using its thermal emission imaging system.
- February 22 – UNITA guerrilla leader Jonas Savimbi is killed in clashes against government troops led by Angolan President José Eduardo dos Santos in Moxico Province, Angola.
- February 23
  - The Revolutionary Armed Forces of Colombia kidnap the presidential candidate Íngrid Betancourt, holding her captive for the next six years.
  - A ceasefire ends Eelam War III in Sri Lanka. It stays in effect until January 2008.
- February 25 – Good Morning Afghanistan begins broadcasting over radio in Dari and Pashto, establishing a national news source for Afghanistan.
- February 27 – A mob attacks a train near Godhra, India, killing approximately 59 people. The state of Gujarat breaks out into riots, including the Gulbarg Society massacre on February 28 that kills approximately 69 people.

=== March ===
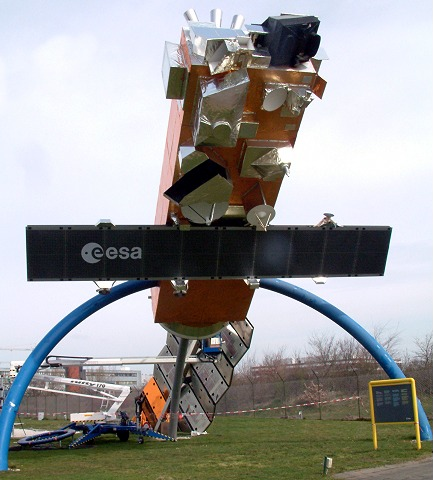
A model of the Envisat satellite

- March 1 – The Envisat environmental satellite is launched, with its purpose being the recording of information on environmental change.
- March 2–10 – Afghan and coalition troops carry out Operation Anaconda in the Shah-i-Kot Valley, the largest combat operation against Al-Qaeda and the Taliban to that point.
- March 3 – Switzerland votes in favor of a referendum to join the United Nations, challenging a long-held tradition of neutrality and isolationism.
- March 11 – The Tribute in Light is installed at the World Trade Center site in New York City.
- March 16 – Sofia Gubaidulina's Johannes-Ostern is premiered, together with her earlier Johannes-Passion, at Hamburg's Michaeliskirche, performed by soloists, choir and orchestra from the Mariinsky Theatre combined with NDR choir and orchestra, conducted by Valery Gergiev.
- March 25
  - 2002 Hindu Kush earthquakes: A 6.1 magnitude earthquake strikes Nahrin, Afghanistan, killing 800 people and leaving 10,000 homeless.
  - Shenzhou 3 is launched from China.
- March 27
  - A Palestinian suicide bomber kills 30 people and injures 140 others at a hotel in Netanya, Israel.
  - Nanterre massacre: A man kills eight members of the Nanterre town council in France at the end of a council meeting.
- March 29 – In response to increasingly common attacks by Palestinian militants, Israeli initiates Operation Defensive Shield, a large-scale counter-terrorism operation in the West Bank.

=== April ===
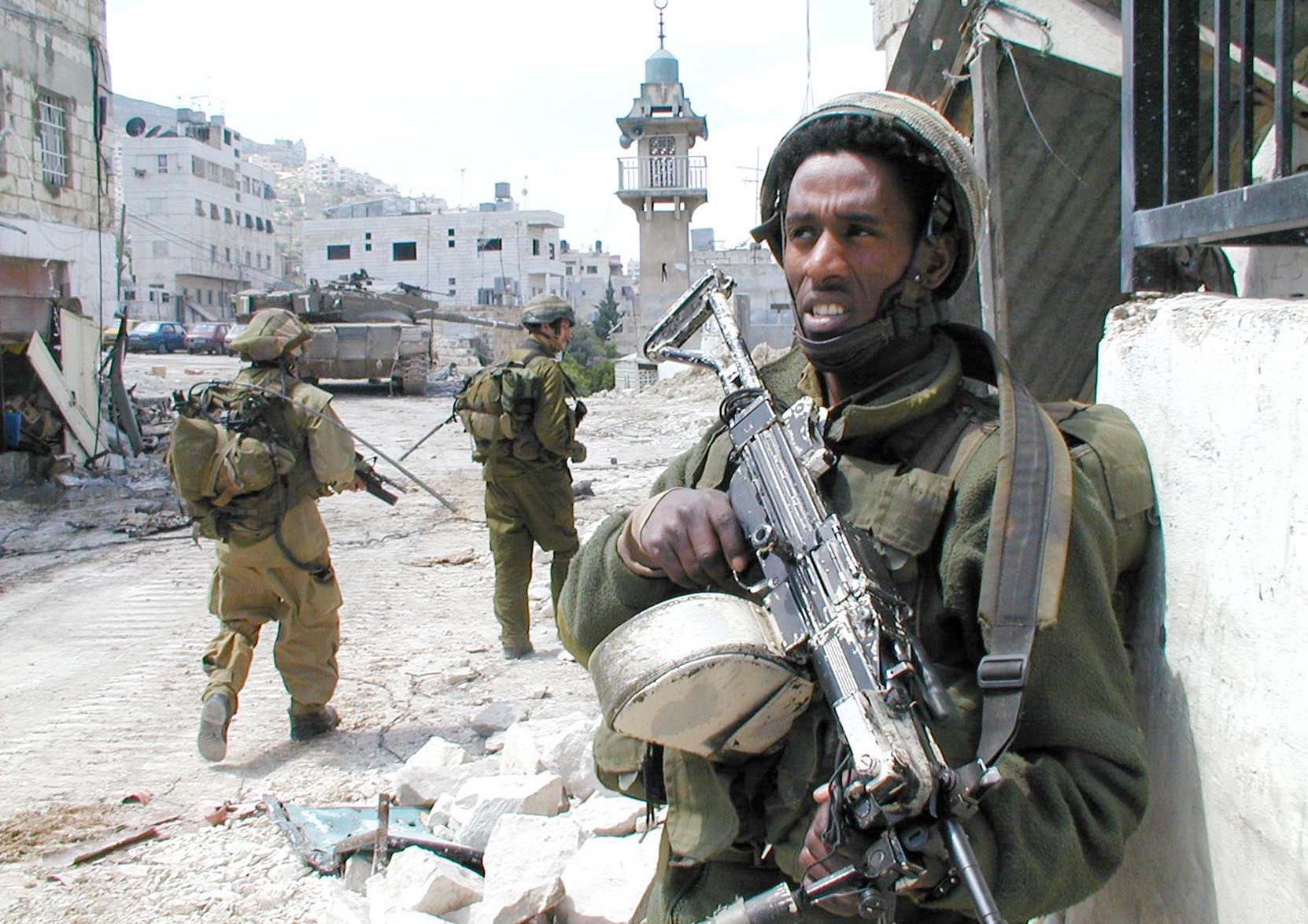
Israel Defense Force soldiers during the Battle of Nablus

- April 1
  - The South West State of Somalia is established as an autonomous territory in Somalia by Hasan Muhammad Nur Shatigadud.
  - Battle of Jenin: Israeli forces attack Palestinian militants in the Jenin refugee camp.
- April 2 – Siege of the Church of the Nativity in Bethlehem: Israeli forces besiege the Church of the Nativity in Bethlehem when militants take shelter there. The siege will last for 38 days.
- April 3–8 – Battle of Nablus: Israeli forces occupy Nablus, Palestine.
- April 4 – A peace agreement is made to end the Angolan Civil War.
- April 5 – The genome sequence for indica rice is published.
- April 11 – Llaguno Overpass events: a shootout takes place between the Caracas Metropolitan Police and pro-government Bolivarian Circles in central Caracas, Venezuela, near the presidential Miraflores Palace, causing 19 deaths and injuring 127 people. The military high command refuse President Hugo Chávez's order to implement the Plan Ávila as a response to the protests and demands his resignation. President Chávez is subsequently arrested by the military. Chávez's request for asylum in Cuba is denied, and he is ordered to be tried in a Venezuelan court.
- April 12 – Augustin Bizimungu is arrested for his involvement in the Rwandan genocide.
- April 14 – President Hugo Chávez of Venezuela is restored to power following an attempted coup.
- April 18 – Romanian mathematician Preda Mihăilescu creates a proof for the Catalan's conjecture, which had gone unsolved for 158 years.
- April 25 – South African Mark Shuttleworth blasts off from the Baikonur Cosmodrome on the Soyuz TM-34, becoming the first African space tourist.
- April 26 – Erfurt school massacre: An expelled student kills 16 people and commits suicide at a school in Erfurt, Germany.

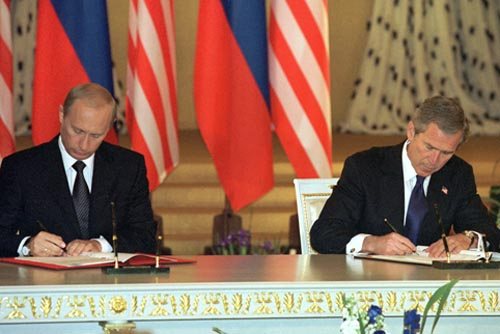
Vladimir Putin and George W. Bush sign the Strategic Offensive Reductions Treaty

=== May ===
- May 2 – Bojayá massacre: A church is struck with a cylinder bomb during a conflict between the Revolutionary Armed Forces of Colombia and the United Self-Defense Forces of Colombia, killing an estimated 119 people.
- May 4 – NASA launches the Aqua satellite as part of the Earth Observing System.
- May 9 – 2002 Kaspiysk bombing: Over 40 people are killed when insurgents bomb a military parade in Kaspiysk, Russia.
- May 10 – American FBI agent Robert Hanssen is sentenced to life in prison for espionage.
- May 13 – Rebels bombard Arthington, Liberia, with artillery during the Second Liberian Civil War causing panic in the neighboring capital, Monrovia.
- May 14 – Kaluchak massacre: Militants attack a bus and an Indian army camp in Kaluchak, Jammu and Kashmir, killing 31 people and escalating the India–Pakistan standoff.
- May 20 – Timor-Leste independence: East Timor regains its independence as the Democratic Republic of Timor-Leste after 2.5 years of United Nations administration and 26 years of Indonesian occupation since 1975.
- May 22 – Nepali Prime Minister Sher Bahadur Deuba asks King Gyanendra to dissolve the parliament amid escalation of the Nepalese Civil War.
- May 24 – United States President George W. Bush and Russian President Vladimir Putin sign the Strategic Offensive Reductions Treaty.
- May 28 – The NATO-Russia Council is established.
- May 30 - The formal eight-month rescue and recovery operation at Ground Zero in New York City officially concluded with a solemn, largely silent ceremony, marking the completion of the removal of approximately 1.8 million tons of debris from the site following the September 11 attacks.
- May 31
  - The 2002 FIFA World Cup begins, taking place in South Korea and Japan.
  - The Kyoto Protocol is ratified by the European Union.

=== June ===
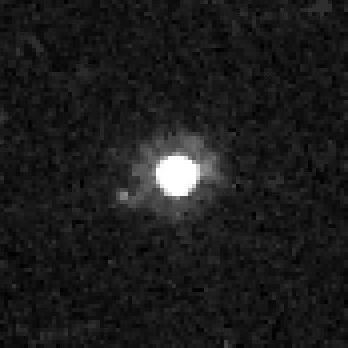
The trans-Neptunian dwarf planet Quaoar and its moon Weywot. Quaoar's two rings are not resolved in this image.

- June 3 – Archaeologists begin uncovering the Liye Qin Slips in Liye, China.
- June 4
  - The ringed dwarf planet Quaoar is discovered by astronomers Chad Trujillo and Michael Brown at the Palomar Observatory.
  - The Zeyzoun Dam in Zayzun, Syria, fails.
- June 8 – The Lennox Lewis vs. Mike Tyson boxing fight takes place. Following a scuffle prior to the match, Lennox Lewis defeats Mike Tyson.
- June 10 – British scientist Kevin Warwick carries out first direct electronic communication experiment between the nervous systems of two humans.
- June 12 – The ImClone stock trading case begins when ImClone Systems CEO Samuel D. Waksal is arrested for insider trading.
- June 13
  - Afghanistan changes its official longform name to the Transitional Islamic State of Afghanistan.
  - The United States withdraws from the Anti-Ballistic Missile Treaty with Russia.
- June 14 – Russia withdraws from the START II nuclear reduction agreement with the United States.
- June 22 – 2002 Bou'in-Zahra earthquake: A 6.5 magnitude earthquake strikes north-western Iran, killing over 200 people.
- June 25 – The WorldCom scandal breaks and the U.S. Securities and Exchange Commission begins its investigation into WorldCom.
- June 29 – Second Battle of Yeonpyeong: During the 2002 FIFA World Cup in South Korea and Japan, two North Korean patrol boats cross a contested border in between the two Koreas and attack two South Korean Chamsuri-class patrol boats.
- June 30 – 2002 FIFA World Cup: Brazil beats Germany 2–0 in the 2002 FIFA World Cup Final with Ronaldo scoring the two goals; Brazil's captain Cafu, who becomes the first player to appear in three successive World Cup finals, accepts the trophy on behalf of the team.

=== July ===
The flag of the African Union

- July 1 – The Rome Statute comes into force, thereby establishing the International Criminal Court.
- July 3 – NASA launches the CONTOUR satellite but loses contact.
- July 5 – The Imperial War Museum North opens in Trafford, England.
- July 9
  - The Organisation of African Unity is disbanded and replaced by the African Union.
  - The Church of England allows divorcees to remarry.
- July 11
  - The first synthetic virus is announced after being successfully created and tested at Stony Brook University.
  - Former Argentine junta leader Leopoldo Galtieri is arrested for the kidnap, torture, and murder of 20 leftist guerillas during the Dirty War.
  - The discovery of the early hominid Sahelanthropus is announced.
- July 13 – Militants attack in Qasim Nagar, Jammu and Kashmir, killing 29 people.
- July 14 – The only captive baiji dolphin dies as the species approaches extinction.
- July 20 – The Machakos Protocol is signed during the Second Sudanese Civil War, establishing a framework for peace talks and possible independence of South Sudan.
- July 21 – At the height of the WorldCom scandal, WorldCom files the largest bankruptcy in American history.
- July 23 – Salvadoran generals José Guillermo García and Carlos Eugenio Vides Casanova are found liable for torture in an American court.
- July 25–August 4 – The 2002 Commonwealth Games are held in Manchester, England.
- July 27 – The Sknyliv air show disaster takes place, killing 77, becoming the deadliest air show accident of all time.

=== August ===
- August 7 – The AKS primality test is published by Manindra Agrawal, Neeraj Kayal, and Nitin Saxena from the Indian Institutes of Technology.
- August 19 – 2002 Khankala Mi-26 crash: Chechen separatists shoot down a Russian Mil Mi-26, killing 127 soldiers. It was the worst aviation disaster in the history of the Russian military.
- August 22–September 4 – Typhoon Rusa, the most powerful typhoon to hit South Korea in 43 years, makes landfall, killing at least 236 people.
- August 26–September 4 – Earth Summit 2002 takes places in Johannesburg, South Africa, aimed at discussing sustainable development by the United Nations.
- August 28 – EUMETSAT launches the Meteosat 8 satellite as part of its Meteosat program.

=== September ===
September 12: The first logo of Media Nusantara Citra.

- September 10 – Switzerland joins the United Nations as the 190th member state after rejecting a place in 1986.
- September 11 – Yemeni al-Qaeda operative Ramzi bin al-Shibh is arrested in Pakistan for involvement in the September 11, 2001 attacks. He will later be found unfit to stand trial.
- September 12 – Media Nusantara Citra officially renamed from PT. Panca Andika Mandiri.
- September 14–27 – Hurricane Isidore crosses Cuba, the Yucatán Peninsula, and Louisiana.
- September 19 – General Robert Guéï leads an army mutiny in an attempt to overthrow Ivory Coast President Laurent Gbagbo, resulting in civil war.
- September 21–October 4 – Hurricane Lili crosses Cuba and several other Caribbean islands before making landfall in Louisiana.
- September 26 - The Senegalese ferry MV Le Joola sinks off the West African coast with 1,863 people killed according to official reports, making it one of the worst peacetime maritime disasters in history. Only 64 passengers survive.
- September 27 – East Timor is admitted to the United Nations as the 191st member state; it also changes its official longform name from "Democratic Republic of East Timor" to "Democratic Republic of Timor-Leste".

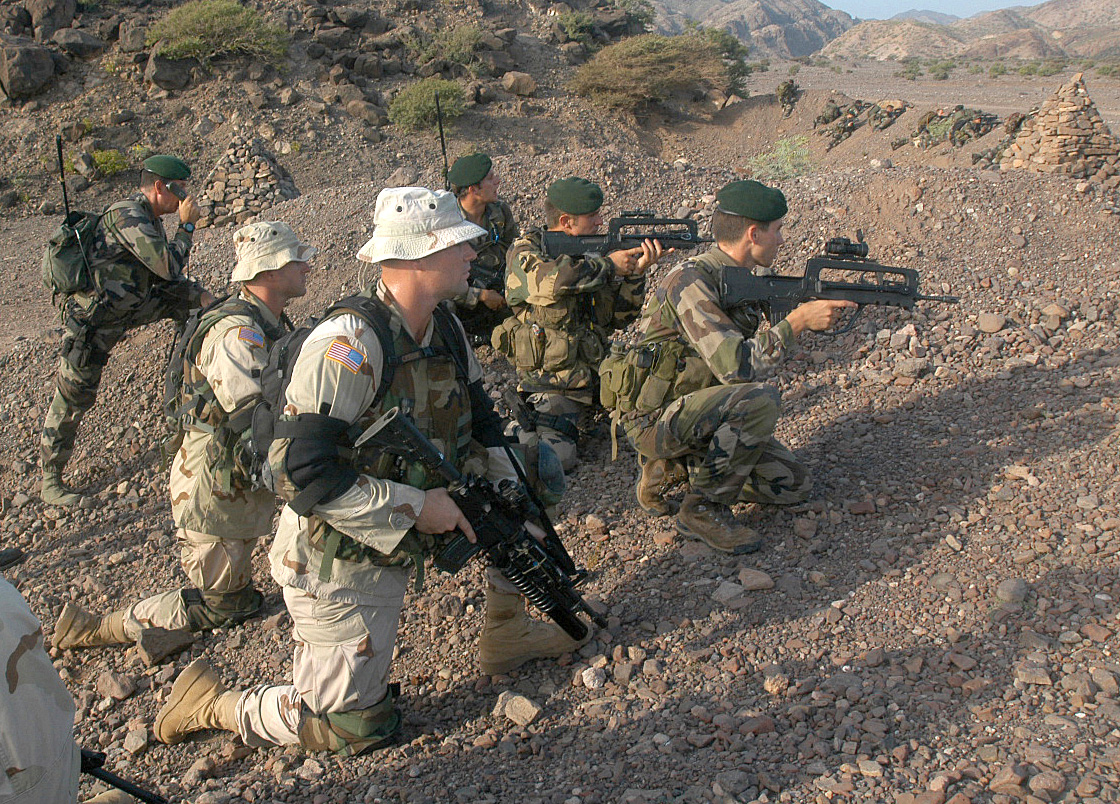
American and French soldiers in Operation Enduring Freedom – Horn of Africa

=== October ===
- October – Operation Enduring Freedom – Horn of Africa: The United States deploys troops to the Horn of Africa to combat Islamist groups and pirates.
- October 2 – Former Republika Srpska president Biljana Plavšić pleads guilty to crimes against humanity for her involvement in the Bosnian genocide.
- October 4 – The genome sequences for malaria carriers anopheles gambiae and plasmodium falciparum are published.
- October 10 – The International Court of Justice rules in favor of Cameroon in Cameroon v. Nigeria.
- October 11 – The United States Congress approves military action in Iraq should it fail to comply with United Nations requirements for weapons of mass destruction.
- October 12 – Jemaah Islamiyah militants detonate multiple bombs in two nightclubs in Kuta, Bali, killing 202 people and injuring over 300 people, making it the worst terrorist act in Indonesia's history.
- October 15 – The Somali Reconciliation Conference begins, initiating peace talks between two factions of the Somali Civil War: the Transitional National Government and the government of Puntland.
- October 16
  - The Indian military stands down from the border with Pakistan, ending the standoff between the two nations.
  - The Bibliotheca Alexandrina opens in Alexandria, Egypt, in a ceremony attended by several heads of state.
- October 17 – The European Space Agency launches the INTEGRAL observatory.
- October 21 – The discovery of the James Ossuary is announced.
- October 23–26 – Chechen rebels take control of the Nord-Ost theatre in Moscow and hold the audience hostage. At least 170 people are killed following a Russian attempt to subdue the militants.
- October 24
  - The culprits of the D.C. sniper attacks are arrested after they kill ten people in the United States over the previous three weeks.
  - 2002 Bahraini general election: Bahrain holds its first Parliamentary elections since 1973.
- October 27 – 2002 Brazilian general election: Luiz Inácio Lula da Silva is elected President of Brazil.
- October 31 – Belarus restricts religious activity outside of the Belarusian Orthodox Church with a new law.

=== November ===
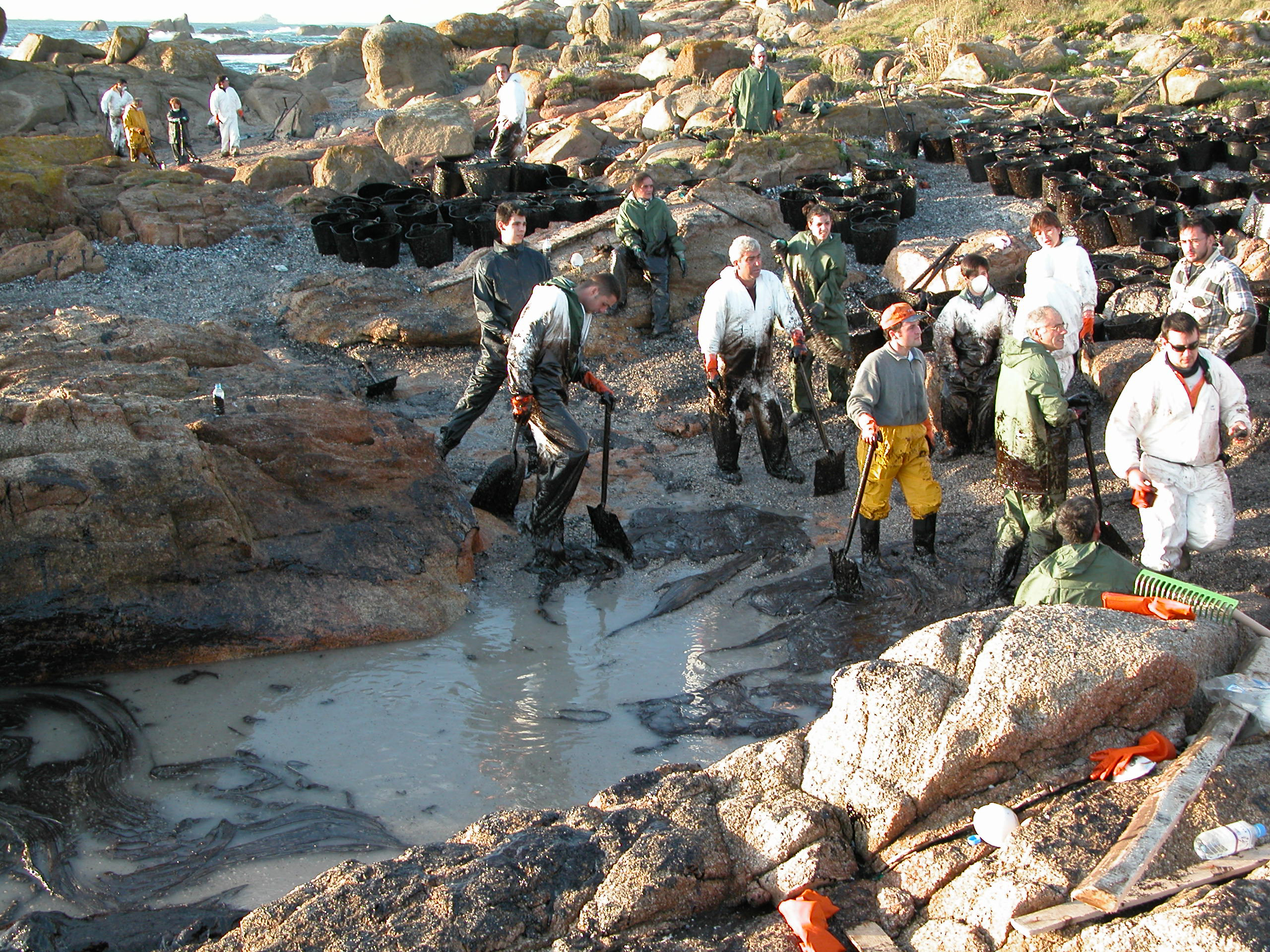
Cleanup after the MV Prestige disaster

- November 3 – 2002 Denali earthquake: A 7.9 magnitude earthquake, one of the strongest North American earthquakes recorded, occurs in Alaska.
- November 7 – A sovereignty referendum is held in Gibraltar. The people reject Spanish sovereignty.
- November 8 – The United Nations Security Council unanimously adopts Resolution 1441, forcing Iraq to either disarm or face "serious consequences". Iraq agrees to the terms of the resolution on November 13.
- November 13 – Prestige oil spill: Greek oil tanker MV Prestige begins spilling oil off the coast of Galicia. It will continue until November 19, spilling 60,000 tonnes of oil in the worst environmental disaster in the history of the Iberian Peninsula.
- November 15 – Hu Jintao becomes General Secretary of the Chinese Communist Party.
- November 16 – 2002–2004 SARS outbreak: The first case of the Severe acute respiratory syndrome (SARS) epidemic, a zoonosis caused by a coronavirus, is recorded in Guangdong province of south China.
- November 22 – Prague summit: NATO announces seven new countries that intend to join: Bulgaria, Estonia, Latvia, Lithuania, Romania, Slovakia, and Slovenia.
- November 25
  - The Hague Code of Conduct is signed to regulate intercontinental ballistic missiles internationally.
  - U.S. President George W. Bush signs the Homeland Security Act into law, establishing the Department of Homeland Security, in the largest U.S. government reorganization since the creation of the Department of Defense in 1947. Following a several month-long transitional period, it commences operations the following year.
- November 28 – 2002 Mombasa attacks: Suicide bombers blow up an Israeli-owned hotel in Mombasa, Kenya, but their colleagues fail in their attempt to bring down an Arkia Israel Airlines charter flight with surface-to-air-missiles.

=== December ===
- December 2 – Opponents of President Chavez begin a strike in Venezuela.
- December 3 – The government of Burundi signs a ceasefire with the CNDD-FDD rebel group to end the Burundian Civil War. It holds until February 2003.
- December 17
  - A peace agreement is made in the Second Congo War, approving the creation of the Transitional Government of the Democratic Republic of the Congo.
  - The International Court of Justice rules in favor of Malaysia in the Ligitan and Sipadan dispute with Indonesia.
- December 27
  - 2002 Grozny truck bombing: Chechen suicide bombers attack the government headquarters in Grozny, Russia, killing over 70 people.
  - 2002 Kenyan general election: Kenya holds its first free elections, ousting the dominant Kenya African National Union Party following a victory of the National Rainbow Coalition.
- December 29 – Shenzhou 4 is launched from China.
- December 31 – The United Nations Mission in Bosnia and Herzegovina ends.

== Nobel Prizes ==

- Chemistry – John B. Fenn and Koichi Tanaka, Kurt Wüthrich
- Economics – Daniel Kahneman and Vernon L. Smith
- Literature – Imre Kertész
- Peace – Jimmy Carter
- Physics – Raymond Davis Jr. and Masatoshi Koshiba, Riccardo Giacconi
- Physiology or Medicine – Sydney Brenner, H. Robert Horvitz, and John E. Sulston
