= Liye Qin Slips Museum =

Museum in Hunan, China

Coordinates: 28°48′5.37″N 109°18′13.30″E

The Liye Qin Slips Museum (Chinese: 里耶秦簡博物館) is a museum of bamboo and wooden slips of the Qin dynasty unearthed in 2002. It is located in the northeast of seat of Liye Town, Longshan County, Hunan Province, China. The Museum was officially opened on October 28, 2010. It covers an area of 36,000 square metres (390,000 square feet) with a building area of 7,200 square metres (78,000 square feet).

In an ancient well of the Ancient City Ruins of Liye built in the Warring States period and abandoned in the late Qin dynasty, more than 36,000 pieces of Bamboo Slips of the Qin dynasty were unearthed in June 2002. The huge amount of bamboo slips are the official files of Qianling County of Dongting Prefecture in the Qin dynasty period, they carry almost all the political, military, economic and social informations of the Qin dynasty.

Before the Liye slips were found, there were only about 2,000 slips on the Qin dynasty and fewer than 1,000 words of official Qin records. The event was considered as the most important archaeological discovery of the Qin dynasty after the Qin Terracotta Army unearthed in 1973, and has been referred to as one of the great discoveries of Chinese archaeology in the 21st century. The bamboo slips and other cultural relics unearthed are regarded as encyclopedias of the Qin dynasty and displayed in the museum.
