= List of works by Richard Meier =

This list of works by Richard Meier organizes the Pritzker-winning American architect's work.

== Background & Criteria ==
Meier's work has spanned several decades and has been internationally recognized with awards and prizes. More than just architecture, Meier has designed furniture, renovated and redesigned individual apartments, and made multiple sculptures. In 1960 Meier worked on his first recorded design, a competition entry for the design of the Franklin Delano Roosevelt Memorial. In 1964 Meier founded Richard Meier & Partners, through which he would produce all of his work for the next several decades. The firm would grow to have an office in New York, and one in Los Angeles. In 2018, amid the MeToo movement, Meier was accused by several women of sexual harassment and assault. He first took a leave, and in late 2018 it was announced that he would permanently resign from his firm. In 2021, the Richard Meier & Partners offices restructured into Meier Partners and STUDIOpractice in New York and Los Angeles respectively. As of 2021, Meier was available for consultation upon request at Meier Partners.

This list considers as part of Richard Meier's artistic canon: all of Meier's work before 1964, all of Richard Meier & Partners' work which began before 2018, as well as any post-2018 work where he is specifically cited as a contributor. This list uses Richard Meier & Partners' official catalog of work as its primary source which includes all of Meier and his firm's creative work - regardless of artistic genre. Other sources are used to supplement and fill in any remaining gaps.

== List ==
Name	Years	City	Country	Image
Lambert House	1961-1962	Lonelyville	United States	
Meier House	1963-1965	Essex Fells	United States	
Dotson House	1964-1966	Ithaca	United States	
Renfield House (with Elaine Lustig Cohen)	1964-1966	Chester	United States	
"Sona" Shop for Handicrafts and Handlooms Exports Corporation of India (with Elaine Lustig Cohen)	1965-1967	New York City	United States	
Studio and Apartment for Frank Stella	1965	New York City	United States	
Smith House	1965-1967	Darien	United States	
Hoffman House	1966-1967	East Hampton	United States	
Rubin Loft Renovation	1966	New York City	United States	
Saltzman House	1967-1969	East Hampton	United States	
Westbeth Artists' Housing	1967-1970	New York City	United States	
Bronx Redevelopment Planning Study	1969	New York City	United States	
House in Old Westbury	1969-1971	Old Westbury	United States	
Twin Parks Northeast Housing	1969-1974	New York City	United States	
Monroe Developmental Center (with Todd Giroux, Architects)	1969-1974	Rochester	United States	
Bronx Developmental Center	1970-1977	New York City	United States	
Maidman House	1971-1976	Sands Point	United States	
Douglas House	1971-1973	Harbor Springs	United States	
Shamberg House	1972-1974	Chappaqua	United States	
New Harmony's Atheneum	1975-1979	New Harmony	United States	
Sarah Campbell Blaffer Pottery Studio	1975-1978	New Harmony	United States	
Aye Simon Reading Room, Solomon R. Guggenheim Museum	1977-1978	New York City	United States	
House in Palm Beach	1977-1978	Palm Beach	United States	
Hartford Seminary	1978-1981	Hartford	United States	
Clifty Creek Elementary School	1978-1982	Columbus	United States	
Museum for the Decorative Arts (Museum für angewandte Kunst)	1978-1985	Frankfurt	Germany	
House in Pittsburgh (Giovannitti House)	1979-1983	Pittsburgh	United States	
High Museum of Art	1980-1983	Atlanta	United States	
Des Moines Art Center Addition	1982-1985	Des Moines	United States	
Siemens Corporate Headquarters (SiemensForum München)	1983-1999	Munich	Germany	
Westchester House	1984-1986	North Salem	United States	
Siemens Office and Laboratory Complex	1984-1999	Munich	Germany	
Ackerberg House	1984-1986	Malibu	United States	
Bridgeport Center	1984-1989	Bridgeport	United States	
Grotta House	1985-1989	Harding Township	United States	
Getty Center	1985-1997	Los Angeles	United States	
New York Office of Richard Meier and Partners	1986	New York City	United States	
Los Angeles Office of Richard Meier and Partners	1986	Los Angeles	United States	
Exhibition and Assembly Building (Stadhaus)	1986-1993	Ulm	Germany	
Weishaupt Forum	1987-1992	Schwendi	Germany	
Royal Dutch Paper Mills Headquarters	1987-1992	Hilversum	Netherlands	
Edinburgh Park Master Plan	1988	Edinburgh	Scotland	
Barcelona Museum of Contemporary Art	1987-1995	Barcelona	Spain	
Canal+ Headquarters	1988-1992	Paris	France	
Espace Pitôt Residential Housing	1988-1993	Montpellier	France	
Administrative and Maritime Center Master Plan	1988	Antwerp	Belgium	
Daimler-Benz Research Center	1989-1993	Ulm	Germany	
Hypolux Bank Building	1989-1993	Luxembourg	Luxembourg	
The Hague City Hall and Central Library	1989-1995	The Hague	Netherlands	
Euregio Office Building	1990-1998	Basel	Switzerland	
Camden Medical Center	1990-1999	Singapore	Singapore	
Plateau Tercier Master Plan	1991	Nice	France	
Rachofsky House	1991-1996	Dallas	United States	
Swissair North American Headquarters	1991-1995	Melville	United States	
Ackerberg House Addition	1992-1994	Malibu	United States	
Addition to [aforelisted] Palm Beach House	1993-1995	Palm Beach	United States	
Alfonse M. D'Amato United States Courthouse	1993-2000	Central Islip	United States	
Gagosian Gallery	1994-1995	Beverly Hills	United States	
Paley Center for Media (formerly: The Museum of Television & Radio)	1994-1996	Beverly Hills	United States	
Neugebauer House	1995-1998	Naples	United States	
Sandra Day O'Connor United States Courthouse (with Langdon Wilson Architects)	1995-1999	Phoenix	United States	
Museum of the Ara Pacis	1996-2006	Rome	Italy	
Jubilee Church (formerly: Church of the Year 2000)	1996-2004	Rome	Italy	
Cathedral Cultural Center	1996-2003	Garden Grove	United States	
Tan House	1997-2002	Kuala Lumpur	Malaysia	
KNP Headquarters	1987-1992	Hilversum	Netherlands	
Westwood Promenade Master Plan	1998	Los Angeles	United States	
Peek & Cloppenburg Department Store	1998-2001	Dusseldorf	Germany	
Rickmers Group Headquarters	1998-2001	Hamburg	Germany	
Friesen House	1998-2001	Los Angeles	United States	
Canon Headquarters	1998-2002	Tokyo	Japan	
San Jose Civic Center	1998-2003	San Jose	United States	
Southern California Beach House	1999-2001	Malibu	United States	
173/176 Perry Street Condominiums	1999-2002	New York City	United States	
UCLA Broad Art Center	2000-2003	Los Angeles	United States	
Master Plan for Pankrac City Office Buildings	2000-2005	Prague	Czech Republic	
Winjhaveb Kwartier Master Plan	2001	The Hague	Netherlands	
Peek & Cloppenburg Department Store	2001-?	Mannheim	Germany	
Viking Research Center	2001-2003	Greenwood	United States	
Burda Collection Museum	2001-2004	Baden-Baden	Germany	
Yale University History of Art and Arts Library	2001-?	New Haven	United States	
66	2002-2003	New York City	United States	
Kojaian Apartment at Perry Street	2002-2003	New York City	United States	
Joy Apartment at Perry Street	2002-2004	New York City	United States	
Cornell University Sciences Technology Building	2001-?	Ithaca	United States	
City Tower	?-2007	Prague	Czech Republic	
Arp Museum	?-2008	Remagen	Germany	
Cornell University's Weill Institute	?-2008	Ithaca	United States	
On Prospect Park	?-2008	New York City	United States	
International Coffee Plaza	?-2010	Hamburg	Germany	
Bodrum Houses	?-2012	Bodrum	Turkey	
Vinci Partners Corporate Headquarters	?-2012	Rio de Janeiro	Brazil	
Vitrum Apartments	?-2013	Bogotá	Colombia	
Teachers Village	?-2013	Newark	United States	
Engel & Völkers Headquarters	?-2015	Hamburg	Germany	
Meier on Rothschild	Work ongoing as of 2017	Tel Aviv	Israel	
685 First Avenue	?-2018	New York City	United States	
