= Liye Ancient City =

Archaeological site in Hunan, China

Coordinates: 28°47′19.51″N 109°17′40.53″E

The Liye Ancient City (Chinese: 里耶古城; pinyin: Lǐyē Gǔchéng) is an archaeological site in Liye Town, Longshan County, Hunan Province, China. It was of seat of the ancient Qianling County (Chinese: 遷陵縣) in Dongting Commandery (Chinese: 洞庭郡) of the Qin dynasty (221–206 BC). It is known for 37,400 Qin bamboo slips unearthed in 2002. The city was built by the Kingdom of Chu in the late Warring States period, reconstructed in the Qin dynasty and abandoned in the early Western Han dynasty. It was approved as a historical and cultural site protected at the national level in Hunan on November 22, 2002. The Liye Qin Slips Museum and the Ruins Park were officially opened on October 28, 2010.

== Archeology ==
In June 1985, a group of bricklayers digging to make bricks excavated ancient potteries and weapons, the archaeologists had gradually carried out archaeological excavations there since then. As part of the Wanmipo Hydropower station (Chinese: 碗米坡水電站) construction, the archaeologists from Hunan Provincial Institute of Cultural Relics and Archaeology (Chinese: 湖南省考古研究所) and the local archaeological units started a rescue excavation for the site of ancient cultural remains in Liye on April 17, 2002, the ancient city gradually revealed. In the ancient city ruins, there are a moat, a rampart, building ruins and drainage facilities, ancient wells are spread regularly in the inner and outer side. All the buildings and facilities together formed a complete system of an ancient city. In June 2002, more than 36,000 Qin Bamboo slips were unearthed in an ancient well, the event was considered as the most important archaeological discovery of the Qin dynasty after the Qin Terracotta Army unearthed in 1973 in an eastern suburb of Xi'an.

== Geography ==
The site is rectangular and adjacent to the You River (Chinese: 酉水) and surrounded by a moat to the north, south and west, there is a crossroad with the main street to the south outside. It is 210.4 meters long north to south with the width of 103 – 107 meters, the remaining area covers about 20,000 square meters.
