= Liye =

Town in Longshan County, Hunan, China

Liye 里耶镇
- Town
- Location in Hunan
- Coordinates: 28°47′9.06″N 109°17′30.59″E
- Country: People's Republic of China
- Province: Hunan
- Autonomous prefecture: Xiangxi
- County: Longshan County
- Time zone: UTC+8 (China Standard)

Liye (Chinese: 里耶鎮; pinyin: Lǐyē zhèn) is a town in Longshan County, Hunan, China. Located on the northern bank of You River, Liye is the southernmost town of the county, and bordered to the west by Youshuihe Town (酉水河鎮) and Keda Township (可大鄉) of Youyang County, Daxi Township (大溪鄉) of Xiushan County of Chongqing, to the south by Qingshuiping (清水坪鎮) and Bi'er Towns (比耳鎮) of Baojing County, to the east and southeast by Maoertan Town (苗兒灘鎮), and to the southwest by Zaguo Township (咱果鄉). The present-day Liye was reformed on November 30, 2015. It covers an area of 259.2 km^{2} (100.1 sq mi), and as of November 2015, it has a registered population of 43,300. The seat is at Liye Community.

== Culture ==
Liye is an ancient town with a history of over 2300 years. It was established by the state of Chu in the late Warring States period (403–221 BC). An archaeological site of ancient humans belonging to the Longshan culture (3000–1900 BC) was found near a bridge in the northeast of the seat of the town in May 1982. Many stone axes, stone chips and red clay pottery were discovered. The ruins dating to the Warring States period were excavated in the yard of Liye Primary School in April 2002. More than 36,000 bamboo slips in the Liye Ancient City were unearthed in June 2002; before the Liye slips were found, there were only about 2,000 slips from the Qin, and fewer than 1,000 words of official Qin records. The event was considered the most important archaeological discovery of the Qin dynasty since that of the Terracotta Army in 1973.

== Attractions ==
The town of Liye is a principal historical and cultural destination in Hunan.

== See also ==
- List of township-level divisions of Hunan
