= SiemensForum München =

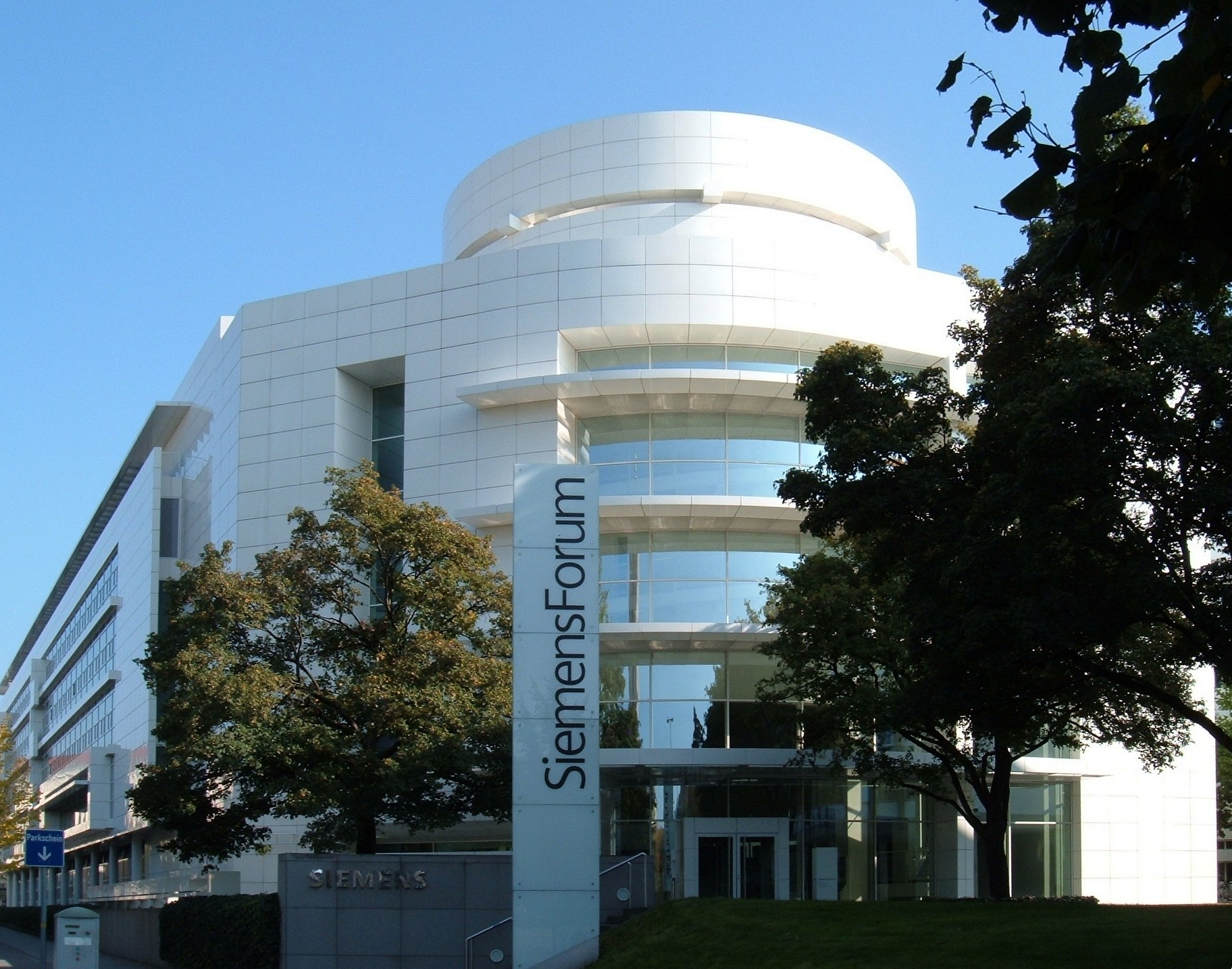
SiemensForum

SiemensForum München was located in Munich, Bavaria, Germany. It was built in 1998 by Richard Meier. The building with 43.000 m^{2} floor space is part of the block between Finken Str., Kardinal Doepfner Str. and Oskar-von-Miller Ring, which housed the Siemens headquarters until 2016.

In 1999, the historical exhibition of Siemens was opened in this building. It closed in 2016 and the exhibition moved to the new headquarters building in Munich.
