= 2002 North American drought =

Natural disaster in North America

Animation of US drought map 2002

The 2002 North American Drought was an exceptional and damaging drought which impacted the Western United States, Midwestern United States and the Mountain States, as well as the Eastern Seaboard.

== Overview ==
The drought of 2002 began around spring and spread over numerous states, including Nebraska, Iowa, Colorado, Wyoming and Utah. Denver was forced to impose water restrictions for the first time in over 20 years. The drought of 2002 had a negative impact in many states.

As usually happens during dry spells in the eastern United States, the 2002 drought was caused by a westward extension of the semi-permanent Bermuda High, which resulted in a continuous flow of hot south-southwesterly air north and caused the storm track to be pushed well off to the west. The density of the Bermuda High also kept hot air at ground level and prevented the formation of convective clouds. The Midwestern states and Mississippi Valley for contrast had a quite wet summer as most rainfall from frontal systems fell in that region. This was much the same weather pattern as the earlier 1999 North American drought, but in 2002 a secondary and unusual event happened when a high pressure system formed over the Gulf of Mexico, a rare occurrence during the summer months. This further blocked the flow of Gulf moisture northward. Precipitation deficits were greatest from New Jersey southward to Georgia and less so in New York and New England with the Great Lakes states and the Mississippi watershed being unusually wet. A shift to an El Nino pattern in fall 2002 brought about wetter, cooler conditions for much of 2003-04 which erased the precipitation deficits from the 1998-02 drought events.

== Canada ==
The drought of 2002 also ravaged certain parts of Canada, particularly Alberta, Manitoba and Saskatchewan.
