= International Code of Conduct against Ballistic Missile Proliferation =

Arms control agreement

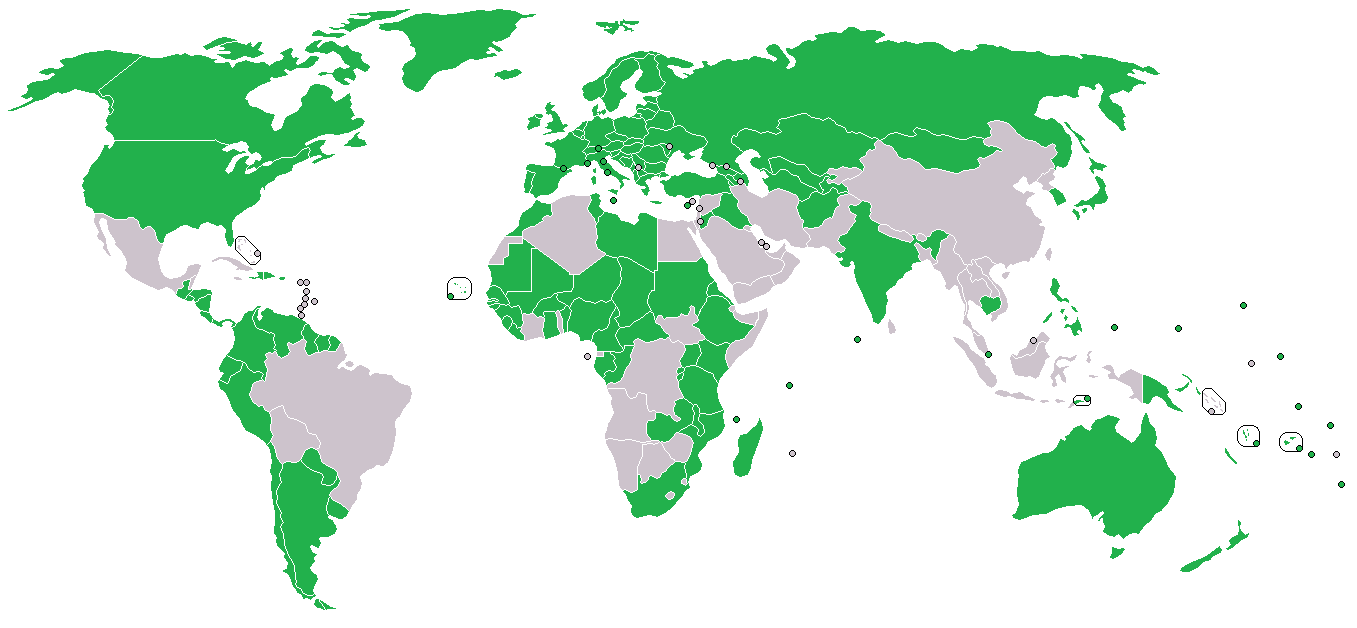
Hague Code of Conduct against Ballistic Missile Proliferation subscribing states.

The International Code of Conduct against Ballistic Missile Proliferation, also known as the Hague Code of Conduct (HCOC), was established on 25 November 2002 as an arrangement to prevent the proliferation of ballistic missiles.

The HCOC is the result of international efforts to regulate access to ballistic missiles which can potentially deliver weapons of mass destruction. The HCOC is the only multilateral code in the area of disarmament which has been adopted over the last years. It is the only normative instrument to verify the spread of ballistic missiles. The HCOC does not ban ballistic missiles, but it does call for restraint in their production, testing, and export.

As agreed by the conference in The Hague, Austria serves as the Immediate Central Contact (Executive Secretariat) and therefore coordinates the information exchange of the HCOC.

To create a link between the United Nations and the HCOC, which was not negotiated in the context of the UN, a Resolution regarding the HCOC was tabled in the course of the 59th as well as the 60th and 63rd sessions of the General Assembly in New York City.

Since the HCOC's entry into force, sixteen Conferences of Subscribing States of the HCOC have been held. The 16th Regular Meeting of Subscribing States of the HCOC took place from 6–7 June 2017 under the chairmanship of Ambassador Marek Szczygieł from Poland.

While the Missile Technology Control Regime (MTCR) has a similar mission, it is an export group with only 35 members.

== Membership ==
Since the signing and entering into force of the HCOC Code in November 2002 in The Hague, (Netherlands) the number of signatories has increased from 96 to 138 (136 UN members, the Cook Islands and the Holy See). India, which joined on 1 June 2016, is the latest signatory of the HCOC.

The 57 non-signatory UN states are:

- Algeria
- Angola
- Bahamas
- Bahrain
- Bangladesh
- Barbados
- Belize
- Bhutan
- Bolivia
- Botswana
- Brazil
- China
- Cuba
- Djibouti
- Egypt
- Equatorial Guinea
- Grenada
- Indonesia
- Iran
- Israel
- Ivory Coast
- Jamaica
- Kuwait
- Kyrgyzstan
- Laos
- Lebanon
- Lesotho
- Malaysia
- Mauritius
- Mexico
- Myanmar
- Namibia
- Nauru
- Nepal
- Niue
- North Korea
- Oman
- Pakistan
- Qatar
- Saint Lucia
- Saint Vincent and the Grenadines
- São Tomé and Príncipe
- Saudi Arabia
- Solomon Islands
- Somalia
- South Sudan
- Sri Lanka
- Syria
- Swaziland
- Thailand
- Togo
- Trinidad and Tobago
- United Arab Emirates
- Vietnam
- Yemen
- Zimbabwe

No states with limited recognition have signed this code.
