= Liye Qin Slips =

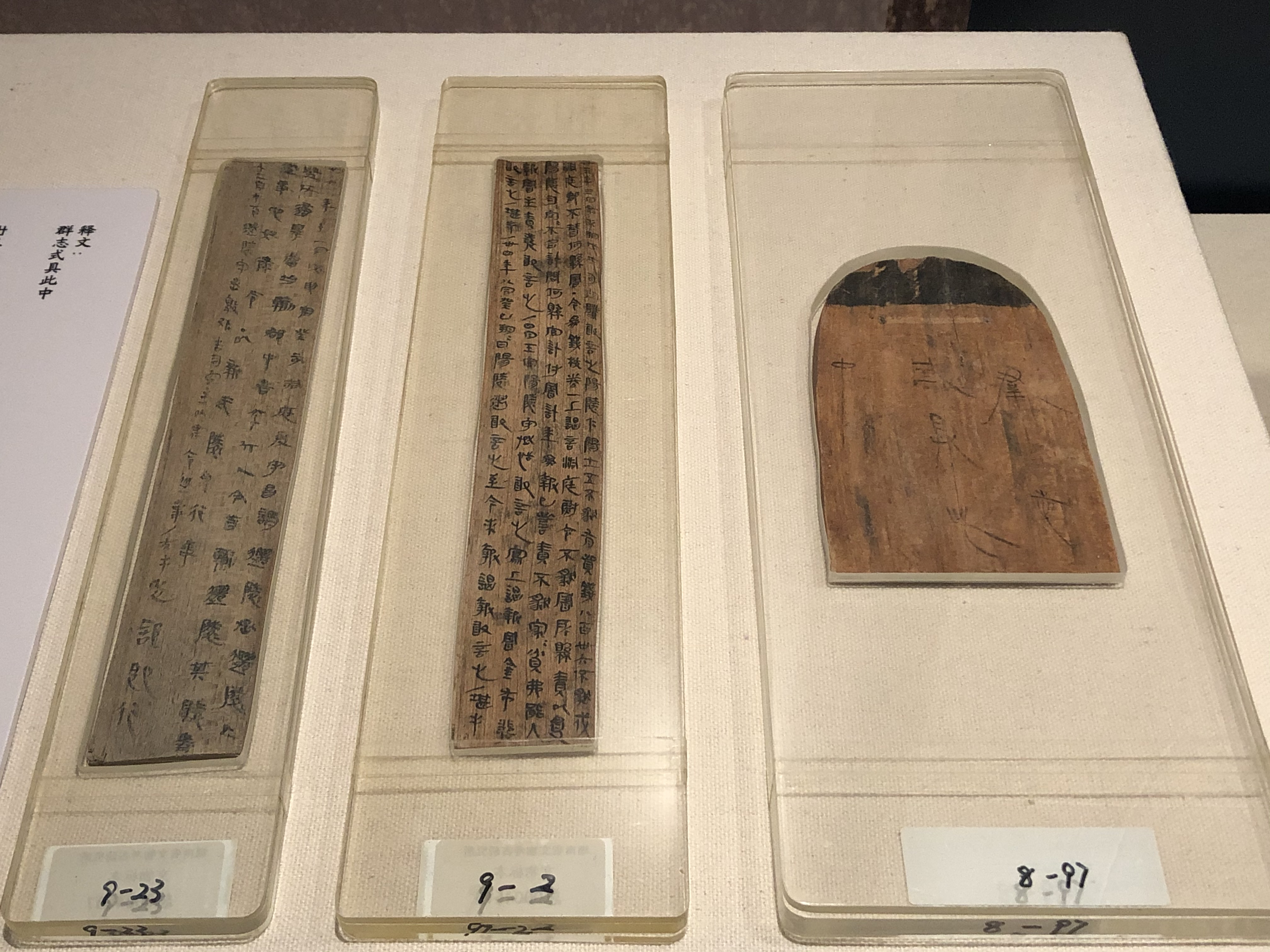
The Liye Qin Slips on display

The Liye Qin Slips (Chinese: 里耶秦簡; pinyin: Lǐyē qínjiǎn) is a large collection of bamboo slips which were unearthed from Liye Ancient City in Longshan County, Hunan, China in 2002. It is one of China's most important archaeological discoveries of the 21st century. Archaeologists found more than 37,000 pieces of bamboo slips, on which more than 200,000 Chinese characters record government and legal documents of the Qin dynasty. It is considered the most important archaeological discovery of the Qin dynasty after the Terracotta Army unearthed in 1973 in Xi'an.

== Main content ==
The Liye bamboo slip documents and archives fully embody a wide range of document types and terms, the constant growth of administrative and judicial document styles. Among them are more than 68 types of archives and content, which have high value of supplementing and testifying history facts. Some in the academic circles have argued that its importance is no less than those of Oracle bone script and Dunhuang manuscripts. The world's oldest example of a multiplication table was found here. The slips, used for writing in ancient times, have great significance in furthering research on Qin dynasty politics, economy and culture. All the historical artifacts from Liye are displayed at the Qin Dynasty Bamboo Slips Museum of Liye (Chinese: 里耶秦簡博物館).

== Research value ==
The Qin bamboo slips of Liye are important for the research of the unification of the Qin Empire and the cultural expansion of the Qin. The slips belong to a model of the local authorities in the Qin dynasty. They also filled in the blank pages of the Records of the Grand Historian and Book of Han on the Qin and Han dynasties, and fundamentally changed the face of the academic history of thousands of years on warring States, Qin and Han dynasties. The slips contain thousands of pieces of bamboo slips without words, which still hold significant research value.
