= Duan Prefecture =

Former prefecture in imperial China

- Simplified Chinese: 端州
- Hanyu Pinyin: Duān Zhōu
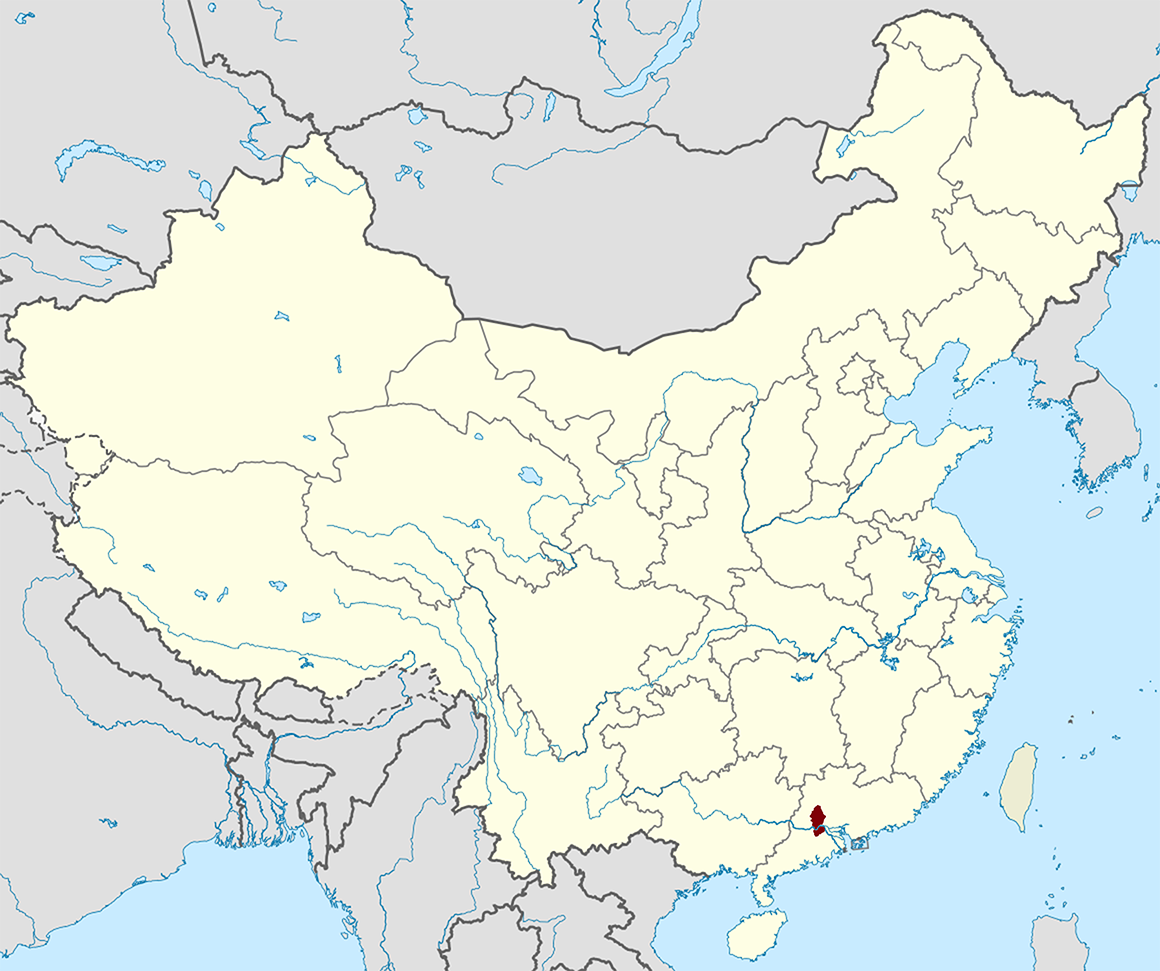
- Population
  - 740s or 750s: 21,120
  - 1070s or 1080s: 25,130
- History
  - Preceded by: Gaoyao Commandery
  - Created: 589 (Sui dynasty); 621 (Tang dynasty); 758 (Tang dynasty)
  - Abolished: 1118 (Song dynasty)
  - Succeeded by: Zhaoqing Prefecture
- Contained within
  - Circuit: Lingnan Circuit; Guangnan Circuit (971–988); Guangnan East Circuit (988–1118)

Duanzhou or Duan Prefecture was a zhou (prefecture) in imperial China in modern Guangdong, China, centering on modern Zhaoqing. Duan Prefecture was a major production center of inkstones.

The modern Duanzhou District in Zhaoqing is named after the prefecture.

== Counties ==
Duan Prefecture administered the following counties (縣) through history (Sui dynasty, Tang dynasty, Southern Han and Song dynasty):

1. Gaoyao (高要), roughly modern Zhaoqing city proper (probably around Gaoyao District).
2. Pingxing (平興), roughly modern Gaoming District, Foshan. Pingxing was abolished by the Song dynasty in 972.
3. Sihui (四會), roughly modern Sihui. Sihui was only under the administration of Duan Prefecture in the Song dynasty.
