= Xinqiao, Guangdong =

Xinqiao 新桥镇
- Town
- Location in Guangdong
- Coordinates: 22°56′54″N 112°24′44″E
- Country: People's Republic of China
- Province: Guangdong
- Prefecture-level city: Zhaoqing
- County-level city: Gaoyao
- Elevation: 14 m (46 ft)
- Time zone: UTC+8 (China Standard)
- Area code: 0758

Xinqiao (simplified Chinese: 新桥; traditional Chinese: 新橋; pinyin: Xīnqiáo; Jyutping: san^{1}kiu^{4}; lit. 'new bridge') is a town under the administration of Gaoyao City in western Guangdong province, China, located 12 kilometres (7.5 mi) south-southwest of downtown Zhaoqing. As of 2011, it has one residential community (社区) and 12 villages under its administration.

== See also ==
- List of township-level divisions of Guangdong
