= Baitu =

Báitǔ (白土镇) may refer to the following towns in China:

- Baitu, Anhui, in Xiao County
- Baitu, Gaoyao, Guangdong
- Baitu, Shaoguan, in Qujiang District, Shaoguan, Guangdong
- Baitu, Hebei, in Ci County
- Baitu, Jiangxi, in Fengcheng

== See also ==
- Baudu
