= Lecheng, Zhaoqing =

Town in Guangdong Province, China

Lecheng 乐城镇
- Town
- Location in Guangdong
- Coordinates: 23°21′19″N 112°20′03″E
- Country: People's Republic of China
- Province: Guangdong
- Prefecture-level city: Zhaoqing
- District: Gaoyao
- Time zone: UTC+8 (China Standard)

Lecheng Town is located in the northwest of Gaoyao County in Guangdong Province at the intersection of Gaoyao County, Deqing County and Guangning County. It covers an area of 94 square kilometers, with 14 villages under its jurisdiction and with a population of 28,000.

== Agriculture ==
Lecheng Town is rich in land resources. Agriculture is the foundation of its economic development, with cinnamon and fingered citron as the main commercial crops. Currently, over 50,000 mu of land is devoted to cultivating cinnamon. Cinnamon and finger citron have become the new growth point of the town's economic development, increasing income for farmers. The town has likewise promoted forestry.

== Industry ==
Lecheng Town takes advantage of its local resource and mainly focuses on resource exploitation and utilization. The "Double Introduction" project (introduction of money and technology) has enjoyed great success. It has formed a batch of township enterprises and private enterprises. A distillery, a soft drink plant, a resin factory, a cinnamon factory and a wood factory have been built up in the town. They contribute a lot to the development of the town's economy.

== Social development ==
Lecheng Town tries to strengthen the construction of spiritual civilization to create a good social environment. Since reform and opening up, the town pays more attention to improve social morality and cultural quality. During these few years, it has gained great success in the development in culture, education and health protection. The security administration of the town has been improved greatly. The local police are trying to crack down pornography, gambling and drug abuse to form a better social environment.

== Tourism ==
Golden Clock Mount is also known as Long Gong Temple. It is located in Lecheng Town, Lingcun village. The temple dated back to the late Qing dynasty and the early Han dynasty. In March, 2007, Guangdong Star Group Tourism Development Co. Ltd.invested a lot money to expand the temple. It was built in Chinese traditional style with materials like brick, wood and rock The new temple covers an area of about 3,000 square meters. It attracts tourists to come for sightseeing, blessing, worshiping the Long Gong etc.

== Subordinate village ==
- Heshe Village
- Xiyuan Village
- Luoban Village
- Lingcun Village
- Bufu Village
- Wuun Village
- Jinji Village
- Luodai Village
- Dongyuan Village
- Sike Village
- Luoyuan Village
- Yincun Village
- Xianrenkeng Village
- Shebo Village

== Demographic data ==
(Source: the fifth census data)

- Total population: 23497
- Male population: 11976
- Female population: 11521
- Household number: 6038
- 0 to 14 years old (total): 7959
- 0 to 14 years old (male): 4127
- 0 to 14 years old (female): 3832
- 15 to 64 years old ( total): 13414
- 15 to 64 years old (male): 6885
- 15 to 64 years old (female): 6529
- Above 65 years old (total): 2124
- Above 65 years old (male): 964
- Above 65 years old (female): 1160
