= Lecheng =

Lecheng may refer to:

- Lecheng, Botswana, village of the Central District
- Lecheng, Zhaoqing (乐城镇), town in and subdivision of Gaoyao District, Zhaoqing, Guangdong, China
- Lecheng Subdistrict (zh; 乐城街道), subdivision of Lechang, Guangdong, China
