= Chongxi Pagoda =

Pagoda in Zhaoqing, Guangdong, China

- 崇禧塔
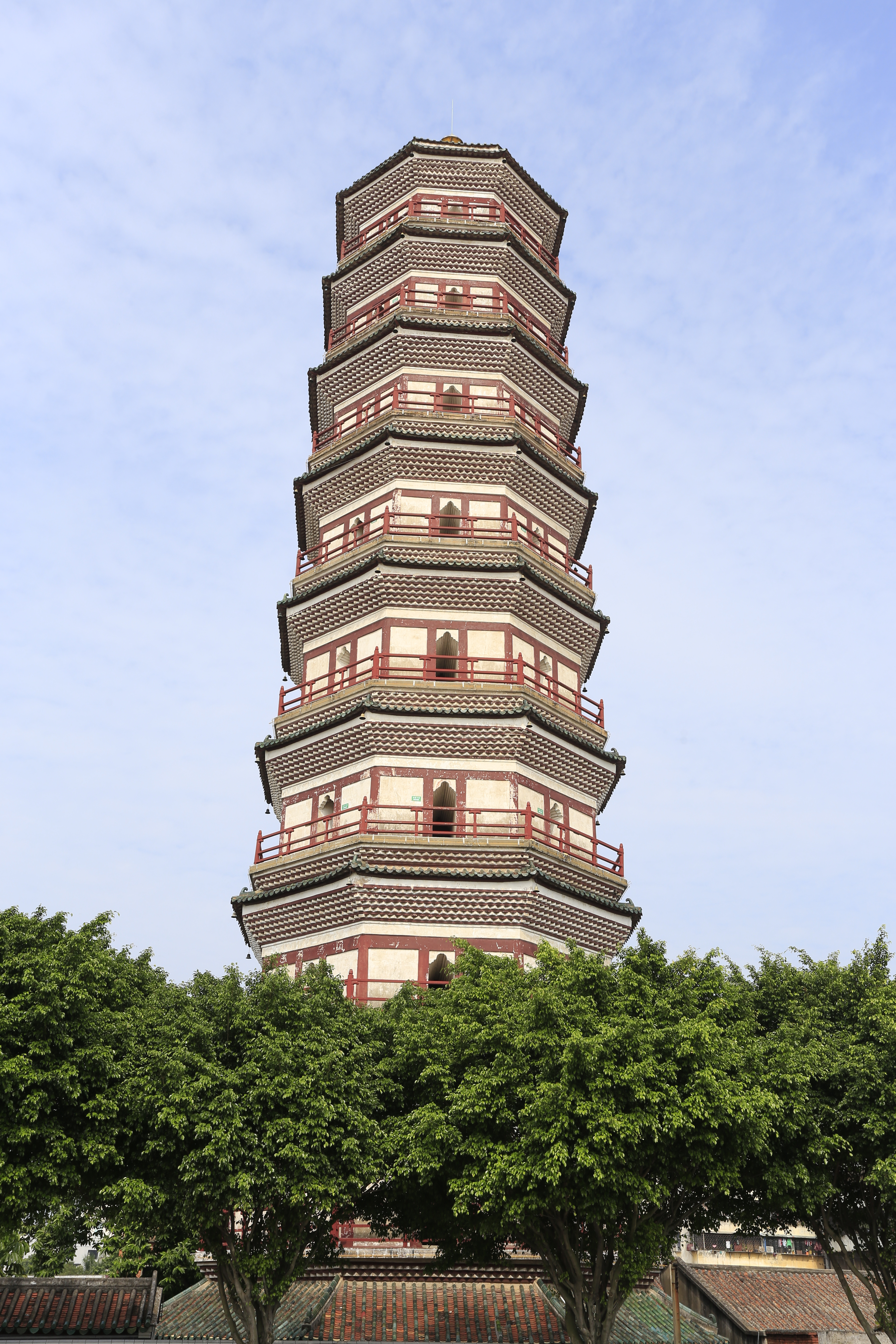
- Chongxi Pagoda in 2013

Location
- Location: Duanzhou District, Zhaoqing, Guangdong
- Interactive map of Chongxi Pagoda
- Coordinates: 23°2′50″N 112°28′40″E

Architecture
- Completed: 1585
- Materials: Brick and stone

Chongxi Pagoda (Chinese: 崇禧塔; pinyin: Chóngxǐ tǎ; Jyutping: Sung^{4}hei^{2} taap^{3}) is a Ming-era pagoda located in Duanzhou District, Zhaoqing, Guangdong, China.

== History ==
Chongxi Pagoda was first built in 1582 and completed in 1585. It was built to "lock" the Xi River dragon which was believed to be behind river floods. The pagoda was in disrepair following the Cultural Revolution and was renovated in 1984.

== Description ==
Built with bricks and stones in an octagonal shape, Chongxi Pagoda stands 57.5 meters tall. There are nine exterior stories and 17 interior stories. The granite base is 1.84 meters tall and 46.5 meters in perimeter.
