= Gaoyao, Zhaoqing =

Gaoyao 高要区 Koyiu
- District
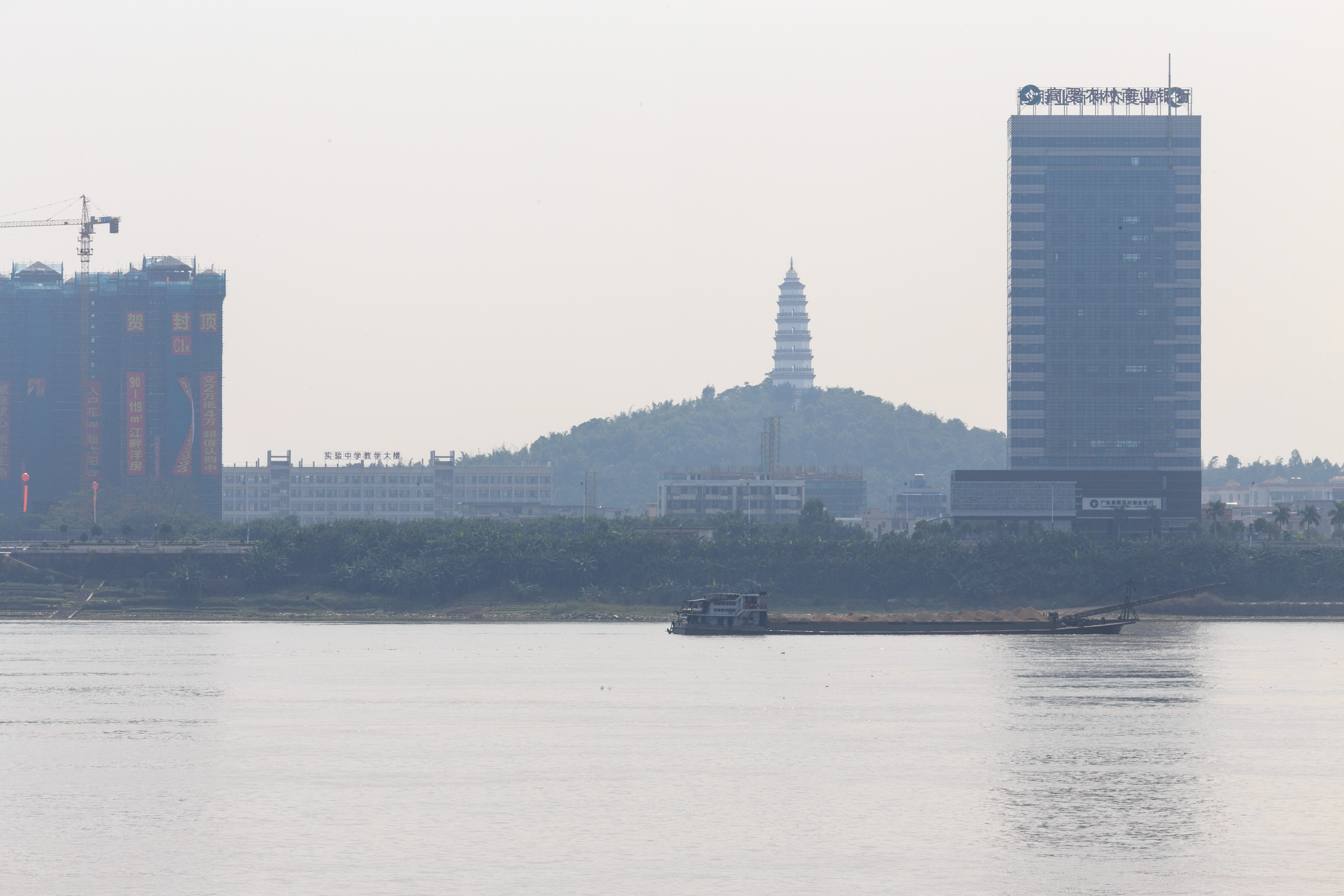

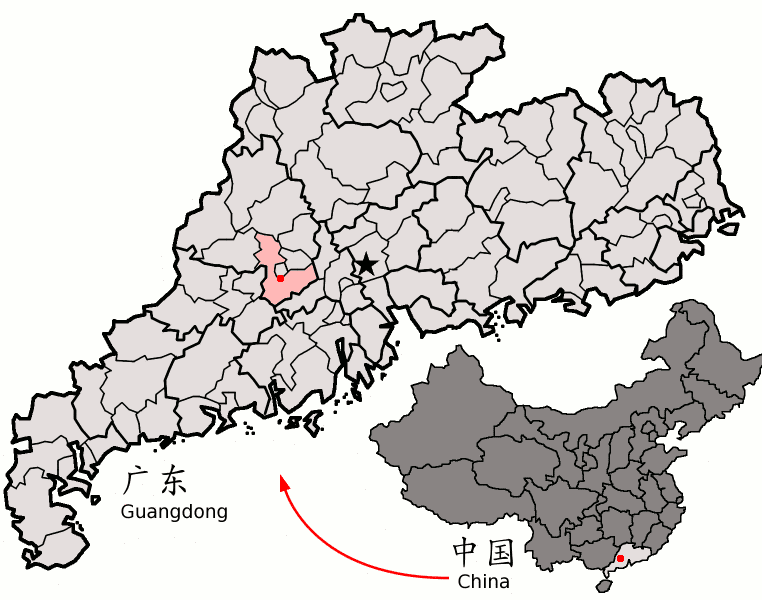
- Location of Gaoyao (red) within Zhaoqing City and Guangdong province

- Location of the seat in Guangdong
- Coordinates: 23°02′N 112°27′E
- Country: People's Republic of China
- Province: Guangdong
- Prefecture-level city: Zhaoqing

Area
  - Total: 2,206 km^{2} (852 sq mi)

Population (2020 census)
  - Total: 741,591
  - Density: 336.2/km^{2} (870.7/sq mi)
- Time zone: UTC+8 (China Standard)

Gaoyao, Zhaoqing
- Chinese: 高要
- Postal: Koyiu
Transcriptions
Standard Mandarin
- Hanyu Pinyin: Gāoyāo
- Wade–Giles: kao^{1}-yao^{1}
Yue: Cantonese
- Jyutping: Gou1-jiu1

Gaoyao, alternately romanized as Koyiu, is an urban district of Zhaoqing in western Guangdong, China. Its population in 2020 was 741,591.

== Name ==
Gaoyao (lit. 'high and wanting') is a former name of the Lingyang Gorge on the Xi River. It was originally the name of the surrounding land but came to be used for the area's seat of government. Gaoyao is the pinyin romanization of the Chinese name, based on its Mandarin pronunciation; the former Chinese Postal Map spelling was based on the local Cantonese pronunciation of the same name. Gaoyao has also sometimes been romanized as Kaou Yaou.

== Geography ==
Gaoyao is located on the southern bank of the Xi River, opposite central Zhaoqing. Both are about 100 kilometers (62 mi) away from Guangzhou, the provincial capital.

== Climate ==
Climate data for Gaoyao, elevation 60 m (200 ft), (1991–2020 normals, extremes 1981–2010)
Month	Jan	Feb	Mar	Apr	May	Jun	Jul	Aug	Sep	Oct	Nov	Dec	Year
Record high °C (°F)	28.3 (82.9)	31.4 (88.5)	32.4 (90.3)	34.4 (93.9)	34.9 (94.8)	37.9 (100.2)	38.5 (101.3)	38.1 (100.6)	36.9 (98.4)	35.8 (96.4)	33.1 (91.6)	30.0 (86.0)	38.5 (101.3)
Mean daily maximum °C (°F)	18.9 (66.0)	20.9 (69.6)	23.5 (74.3)	27.9 (82.2)	31.3 (88.3)	33.2 (91.8)	34.2 (93.6)	33.9 (93.0)	32.3 (90.1)	29.6 (85.3)	25.6 (78.1)	20.8 (69.4)	27.7 (81.8)
Daily mean °C (°F)	13.9 (57.0)	16.0 (60.8)	19.2 (66.6)	23.4 (74.1)	26.5 (79.7)	28.2 (82.8)	28.9 (84.0)	28.6 (83.5)	27.2 (81.0)	24.2 (75.6)	19.9 (67.8)	15.2 (59.4)	22.6 (72.7)
Mean daily minimum °C (°F)	10.6 (51.1)	12.7 (54.9)	16.1 (61.0)	20.3 (68.5)	23.3 (73.9)	25.1 (77.2)	25.6 (78.1)	25.3 (77.5)	23.9 (75.0)	20.3 (68.5)	16.0 (60.8)	11.5 (52.7)	19.2 (66.6)
Record low °C (°F)	3.1 (37.6)	3.9 (39.0)	6.1 (43.0)	10.7 (51.3)	16.8 (62.2)	20.4 (68.7)	22.9 (73.2)	22.6 (72.7)	18.8 (65.8)	13.4 (56.1)	5.3 (41.5)	1.7 (35.1)	1.7 (35.1)
Average precipitation mm (inches)	51.8 (2.04)	43.9 (1.73)	76.2 (3.00)	130.3 (5.13)	189.2 (7.45)	212.3 (8.36)	189.1 (7.44)	188.8 (7.43)	150.6 (5.93)	56.6 (2.23)	41.9 (1.65)	37.8 (1.49)	1,368.5 (53.88)
Average precipitation days (≥ 0.1 mm)	7.9	10.3	14.8	14.9	18.0	19.7	16.8	16.0	11.8	5.0	5.5	5.9	146.6
Average relative humidity (%)	78	79	81	80	81	81	79	80	79	75	75	75	79
Mean monthly sunshine hours	99.7	75.9	58.2	77.2	124.5	147.0	191.8	183.8	173.3	182.9	156.3	140.5	1,611.1
Percentage possible sunshine	30	24	16	20	30	36	46	46	47	51	48	42	36
Source: China Meteorological Administration

== History ==
Gaoyao was a county of the Qin and Han and its eponymous county seat was the principal settlement of the area. Under the Sui, the administration relocated across the river to Duanzhou, which was renamed Zhaoqing under the Song. Gaoyao continued as a separate county in Zhaoqing Commandery. It was promoted to a county-level city in 1993 and later to urban district status.

== Culture and people ==
- Gaoyao is closely connected with the Duanzhou District of Zhaoqing City, geographically as well as culturally. The two urban districts are connected by two road bridges and a railway bridge.
- Gaoyao is also a known hometown for many Overseas Chinese. There is a large community from Gaoyao in Sydney, Australia.

Notable figures include:

- Liang Han Chao (梁寒操): historian, educator, and also founder of Kwangtung cultural and history periodical.
- Herbert Chow Ciu Lung (周小龍): founder of chickeeduck clothing, also a Hong Kong social activist.
- Joshua Wong Chi-fung (黃之鋒): Hong Kong male politician
- Fong Lai Ying (方麗盈): Hong Kong experienced female singer

== Tourism ==
Places of interest include the Red Mansion and Gaoyao Xuegong Pavilion. There are also three pagodas that can be seen in Gaoyao.

=== Image gallery ===
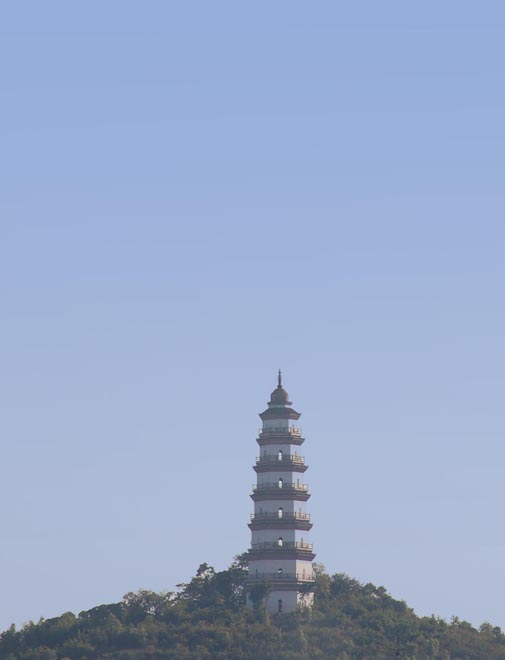

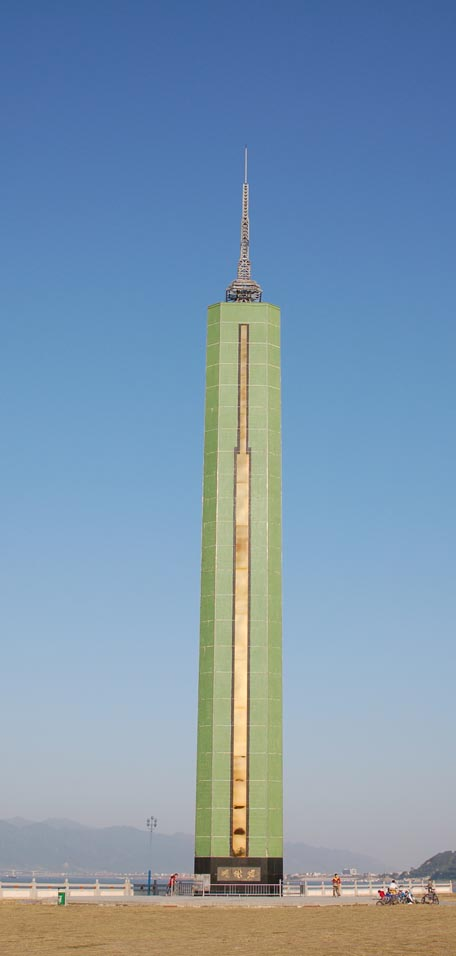

== Administrative divisions ==
Gaoyao has jurisdiction over one subdistrict and several towns:

Name	Chinese (S)	Hanyu Pinyin	Population (2010)	Area (km^{2})
Nan'an Subdistrict	南岸街道	Nán'àn Jiēdào	81,886	36.5
Hetai town	河台镇	Hétái Zhèn	33,660	150
Lecheng town	乐城镇	Lèchéng Zhèn	24,337	94
Shuinan town	水南镇	Shuǐnán Zhèn	11,598	126
Lubu town (Lukpo)	禄步镇	Lùbù Zhèn	63,488	254
Xiaoxiang town	小湘镇	Xiǎoxiāng Zhèn	30,964	200
Dawan town	大湾镇	Dàwān Zhèn	34,535	108
Xinqiao town	新桥镇	Xīnqiáo Zhèn	39,265	41.8
Baizhu town	白诸镇	Báizhū Zhèn	36,977	128
Liantang town	莲塘镇	Liántáng Zhèn	58,429	125
Huodao town	活道镇	Huódào Zhèn	41,358	228
Jiaotang town	蛟塘镇	Jiāotáng Zhèn	33,060	130
Huilong town	回龙镇	Huílóng Zhèn	25,426	124.25
Baitu town	白土镇	Báitǔ Zhèn	71,430	108.4
Jindu town	金渡镇	Jīndù Zhèn	43,623	101.23
Jinli town	金利镇	Jīnlì Zhèn	93,792	141.3
Xiangang town	蚬岗镇	Xiǎngǎng Zhèn	29,292	96.6
