= Huilong, Deqing County, Guangdong =

Huilong 回龙镇
- Town
- Location in Guangdong
- Coordinates: 23°11′31″N 111°41′22″E
- Country: People's Republic of China
- Province: Guangdong
- Prefecture-level city: Zhaoqing
- County: Deqing
- Village-level divisions: 1 residential community 9 villages
- Elevation: 26 m (85 ft)
- Time zone: UTC+8 (China Standard)
- Area code: 0758

Huilong (simplified Chinese: 回龙; traditional Chinese: 回龍; pinyin: Huílóng) is a town of Deqing County in western Guangdong province, China, situated on the northern (left) bank of the Xi River 11 kilometres (6.8 mi) northwest of the county seat along China National Highway 321. As of 2011, it has one residential community (社区) and nine villages under its administration.

== See also ==
- List of township-level divisions of Guangdong
