= Wangtang, Guangdong =

Wangtang 旺塘村
- Village
- Location in Guangdong
- Coordinates: 23°27′35″N 112°39′18″E
- Country: People's Republic of China
- Province: Guangdong
- Prefecture-level city: Zhaoqing
- County-level city: Sihui
- Town: Jianggu

Wangtang (Chinese: 旺塘; pinyin: Wàngtáng Cūn) is a village in Jianggu Town (江谷镇) of the county-level city of Sihui, in the prefecture-level city of Zhaoqing, Guangdong Province, China. It is located in the southern part of Jianggu Town, some 4 km from the town center, and has a population of 2,570.

The village is served by Guangdong Provincial Highway 260 (S260).

== See also ==
- List of villages in China
