= Huilong, Gaoyao =

Huilong 回龙镇
- Town
- Location in Guangdong
- Coordinates: 22°56′09″N 112°37′47″E
- Country: People's Republic of China
- Province: Guangdong
- Prefecture-level city: Zhaoqing
- County-level city: Gaoyao
- Village-level divisions: 1 residential community 16 villages
- Elevation: 9 m (30 ft)
- Time zone: UTC+8 (China Standard)
- Postal code: 526112
- Area code: 0758

Huilong (simplified Chinese: 回龙; traditional Chinese: 回龍; pinyin: Huílóng) is a town under the administration of Gaoyao City in western Guangdong province, China, situated 21 kilometres (13 mi) southeast of Zhaoqing. As of 2011, it has one residential community (社区) and 16 villages under its administration.

== See also ==
- List of township-level divisions of Guangdong
