= Jindu =

Coordinates: 23.0372°N 112.5151°E

Jindu 金渡镇
- Town

Chinese transcription(s)
- Interactive map of Jindu
- Country: China
- Province: Guangdong
- Prefecture-level city: Zhaoqing
- County-level city: Gaoyao
- Time zone: UTC+8 (China Standard Time)

Jindu (Chinese: 金渡镇) is a town of the People's Republic of China situated in Zhaoqing, Guangdong, China.

== See also ==
- List of township-level divisions of Guangdong
