= Chengbei Subdistrict, Zhaoqing =

Chengbei Subdistrict 城北街道
- Subdistrict
- Location in Guangdong
- Coordinates: 23°03′08″N 112°27′24″E
- Country: People's Republic of China
- Province: Guangdong
- Prefecture-level city: Zhaoqing
- District: Duanzhou
- Elevation: 14 m (46 ft)
- Time zone: UTC+8 (China Standard)
- Postal code: 526040
- Area code: 0758

Chengbei Subdistrict (Chinese: 城北街道; pinyin: Chéngběi Jiēdào; lit. 'city north') was a subdistrict of Duanzhou District, Zhaoqing, Guangdong, People's Republic of China. As of 2011, it has 18 residential communities (Chinese: 社区; pinyin: Shèqū) under its administration. Chengbei Subdistrict was split between Chengxi Subdistrict and Chengdong Subdistrict in 2013.

== History ==
In 2013, Chengbei Subdistrict was abolished by the government of Zhaoqing. Chengbei Subdistrict was merged into Chengxi Subdistrict and Chengdong Subdistrict.

== Administrative divisions ==
Chengbei Subdistrict had 18 residential communities (Chinese: 社区; pinyin: Shèqū) under its administration.

The following nine residential communities were merged into Chengxi Subdistrict:

- Cuixing Community (Chinese: 翠星社区)
- Xinghe Community (Chinese: 星荷社区)
- Kanglebei Community (Chinese: 康乐北社区)
- Duanliu Community (Chinese: 端六社区)
- Duanwu Community (Chinese: 端五社区)
- Denggao Community (Chinese: 登高社区)
- Caochang Community (Chinese: 草场社区)
- Zhongyong Community (Chinese: 忠勇社区)
- Mumin Community (Chinese: 睦民社区)

The following nine residential communities were merged into Chengdong Subdistrict:

- Huayuanhoujie Community (Chinese: 花园后街社区)
- Shuishiying Community (Chinese: 水师营社区)
- Yatu Community (Chinese: 雅图社区)
- Gutabei Community (Chinese: 古塔北社区)
- Lianhu Community (Chinese: 莲湖社区)
- Duansi Community (Chinese: 端四社区)
- Jingde Community (Chinese: 景德社区)
- Duansan Community (Chinese: 端三社区)
- Heping Community (Chinese: 和平社区)

== See also ==
- List of township-level divisions of Guangdong
