= Baitu, Gaoyao =

Town in Guangdong, China

Baitu 白土镇
- Town
- Location in Guangdong
- Coordinates: 22°59′21″N 112°35′39″E
- Country: People's Republic of China
- Province: Guangdong
- Prefecture-level city: Zhaoqing
- District: Gaoyao
- Time zone: UTC+8 (China Standard)

Baitu (Chinese: 白土镇) (Pakto; Paitu) is a town in Gaoyao District, Guangdong, China.
