= Luo Xianxiang =

Chinese general (1890–1968)

- 羅獻祥 (Law Hin-Cheung)
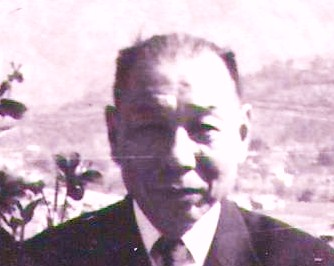
- Luo Xianxiang in 1962
- Born: 1890; Sihui, Guangdong Province, Great Qing
- Died: 1968 (aged 77–78); British Hong Kong
- Spouse(s): 羅歐慧蓮 Luo Ou Huilian / Law Au Wailin m. 1892?–1952? 羅夫人 m. 1893?–1921?
- Children: 5
- Military career
- Allegiance: Republic of China
- Branch: National Revolutionary Army
- Service years: 1916–1949, including services at regional/local government
- Rank: General
- Nickname: 次黎

Luo Xianxiang (Chinese: 羅獻祥; Mandarin: Luo Xianxiang; Cantonese: Law Hin-Cheung) (1890–1968) was a World War II Chinese general who served in the army of Chen Jiongming. He was a soldier, and at times, a regional government official. He established anti-corruption policies and conducted administrative and education reforms.

He was born in Sihui, Guangdong Province, and his native tongue was Cantonese. He fought against the Japanese and helped drive them out. During the Chinese Civil War, he fought on the side of the Kuomintang. When the Communists under Mao Zedong won and took over mainland China, Luo fled to Hong Kong, where he lived the rest of his life.

== Name ==
Luo was given the name Xianxiang (獻祥), literally meaning "dedication and harmony". He devoted his life to harmony. As in the tradition dated back to Confucius' time, when Luo Xianxiang became of age, his name was added into the Law clan registry, and at the same time, he was given a second name 次黎. While this second name literally meant "second to the peasants", for him, it meant to serve his country with humility.

== Early years ==
Luo Xianxiang was born in Guangdong during the late Qing dynasty and was the second of six children. Luo was from a family of scholars, and his parents were well off, landed gentry. His father was a scholar from the Qing Dynasty and opened a primary school for the local children, which Luo attended for his initial schooling. Later, his father left to work as an educator in Foshan (佛山) for many years. The family's experience and connection to education were instrumental to Luo's later successes in education and other reforms. In 1908, Luo enrolled in the Guangdong Army Primary School, followed by Nanjing Army Middle School, to graduation in June 1916, from the Baoding Military Academy-Cavalry Division.

Upon graduation, he was commissioned to serve under Chen Jiongming, the Governor and General of the Guangdong Army.

During this time, the establishment of the Republic of China was far from complete, with many generals and warlords fighting either for self interests or for their ideals of forming a Democratic Republic. In the south, the armies were loosely united under Sun Yat Sen.

In 1918, Luo was appointed Adjutant Commander for the fourth Guangdong Army, head of the 17th command. In 1920, he was Brigade Commander of the Independent third Army.

== June 16, 1922 Incident ==
To unite China under one central government, the southern armies needed to defeat the northern armies. However, on-going warfare amongst the different factions, between the northern and the Guangdong or southern armies, led to great casualties and misery among the civilians.

Within the southern armies, there were serious discords amongst the generals, Sun Yat Sen, and those who supported him. Of all the differing factors, a couple stood out. For example, Sun Yat Sen believed in a centralized government and mandated that all generals must pledge allegiance to him. This request was counter to the idea of democracy. Thus, many generals balked in taking part. This included Guangdong Governor and Commander in Chief Chen Jiongming who wanted to implement a federalist type of governance with Guangdong as a model province. In Guangdong, when he was in control, he established policies against corruption, nepotism, championed woman's rights, banned and burned heroin. Some reforms were eventually abolished after Sun gained control of Guangdong in 1925.

In April 1922, Chen Jiongming was discharged when he refused to embark on a “Northern Expedition”, Sun's attempt to defeat the Northern Army in order to unite the country. On June 16, 1922, unable to accept Sun Yat Sen's leadership, Chen Jiongming's subordinate Yip Ku (葉舉 Ye Ju) ordered the arrest of Sun Yat Sen. Luo was tasked to carry out this order. However, the plan was leaked and Sun escaped to Yongfeng warship (永豐艦), from where Sun rallied his base. In history, this was known as 6.16 Incident. After Sun's departure, Chen Jiongming returned to govern Guangdong Province.

Meanwhile, Sun sent for Chiang Kai-shek to join him in the struggle. The 16 June Incident propelled Chiang Kai-shek to prominence and power within the Kuomintang (KMT) of China. On January 4, 1923, Sun waged war against Guangdong where Chen was based. With the help from two armies, Sun was able to attack Chen from the east and from the west. On January 15, Chen left Guangdong, relocating to Huizhou / Waizhou (惠州) where he stayed. On February 21, Sun returned to Guangzhou, and from May 28, 1923, to October 27, Sun's forces attacked Waizhou without any conclusive results. By 1924, Chen's armies were able to resist the invading forces, and both sides fought to a standstill. As a Brigade Commander, Luo fought in these conflicts on the side of Chen's Guangdong Army.

In 1924, Sun Yat Sen bombed Guangzhou, Seikwan District (广州西关屠城事件) causing massive destruction of properties and civilian lives. From the cruelty exhibited in this Guangzhou Seikwan Incident, the people of Guangdong supported Chen Jiongming, who was in the process of planning counterattacks. However, Sun had accepted Russian aid, the same aid which he had refused on grounds that he did not want to be beholden to a communist country. Further, Sun had joined forces with the Chinese communists, who were gaining strength. With more advance munitions, Sun's army together with the communist forces, under Chiang Kai-shek gained the upper hand.

Towards the end of 1925, with the participation of Russia and Chinese communists, Sun was victorious. Chen escaped and spent his remaining years in Hong Kong. Chen's army was disbanded and absorbed into Chiang's forces.

== 1925 to 1939 ==
From 1925 – 1928, Luo was Regiment Commander for the 14th Army and the Guangdong Police and Defense Regiments in Chiang's army, where he suppressed militant gangs, bringing law and order to the region.

In April 1928, Luo was Police Commissioner for Nanhi County (南海县).

With the unification of the south, the KMT's Republic of China was established on July 1, 1925, in Guangzhou, Guangdong Province, four months after Sun Yat-Sen's death, in March of that same year.

Luo was appointed Special Envoy and Chief Inspector for Guangdong Province in April 1930. By 1932, Luo became County Magistrate for Yangshan (陽山), and years later, Luo was the Mayor of Shantou (汕头市长).

With the start of the Japanese invasion in 1937, China needed new armies. This led to the massing of armed forces in a hurry. During this time and through 1938, Luo was in Guangdong carrying out reforms in education, administration, law, and political affairs. In 1939, Luo returned to active duty, joined the 12th Army Group as senior officer.

== The 66th Army ==
In 1937 January, with the Japanese invasion in earnest, the 66th Army was formed by incorporating the 159th and 160th Divisions. Yip Sui (葉肇) and Division Commander, Chan Kai (陈骥) led the 66th Army with distinction. The 66th army participated in the Battle of Wuhan in 1938. Holding out for ten months in bitter defensive warfare with heavy casualties, the Chinese forces were able to inflict unacceptable losses to the Japanese, ending with a strategic victory. Later in 1938, the 66th Army engaged the enemies in two fronts. The 160th Division won the Battle of Kamlunfan (金輪峰 Jinlunfeng) while the 159th Division won the Battle of Wanjialing.

On November 15, 1939, Japanese forces landed on Yimzhouwan (欽州灣 Qinzhouwan). By November 24, the Japanese invaded Nan-ning (南寧). As the Chinese Army was spread over a few fronts, the 66th Army was summoned to defend Kunlunkwan (昆仑关). At the time, the 66th Army was in the process of reformation due to heavy losses from prior battles, and did not have sufficient manpower to staff the divisions. So, in December 1939, Yip Sui from Divisional Headquarters, borrowed Luo Xianxiang from the 12th Army Group, to be the Senior Advisor and Chief of Staff for the 159th Division.

However, due to lack of coordination and miscommunications, the 66th was unable to hold Kunlunkwan (昆仑关). This defeat led to the demotions of two generals and court martial for a couple of brigade commanders. The 66th was reconstituted and continued to actively participate in driving the Japanese out of China and Southeast Asia. This KMT army lasted until 1949 when the Communists overran the Republic of China of Chiang Kai-shek, who retreated to Taiwan.

== Post-1940 ==
After a brief stint with the 66th in 1939, Luo Xianxiang returned to Guangdong in 1940 to become the Senior Advisor of the #7 war zone. In 1942, Guangdong #4 Administrative Zone Special Envoy Chan Kai (陈骥) was reassigned. Luo Xianxiang assumed the post as Special Envoy and Chief Commander for Security of the 4th Administrative Zone in Guangdong, where he initiated and successfully completed major administration reforms. Later, Luo was Special Administrative Commissioner and Security Commander for the 10th Administrative Zone, Guangdong Province.

== Japanese surrender in Guangdong ==
In 1944 June, Luo Xianxiang was appointed Divisional Commander of Wailun District (惠龍師官區). On September 11, 1945, Lui Pei-Nan (缪培南 Liao Peinan) accompanied by Luo Xianxiang and others accepted the unconditional surrender from the Japanese in Guangdong. After serving as Special Commissioner for the 10th Administration Zone, Guangdong Province, Luo Xianxiang retired in 1946.

During this time, the civil war between Kuomintang and the Communists Party, later known as the Republic of China and the People's Republic of China, respectively, continued unabated.

== Defeat of Kuomintang ==
By 1949 October, the People's Republic of China Communists army took Guangzhou. Even though at the time Luo Xianxiang was the County Chief of Sihui (四會縣縣長), he was a retired General of the Republic of China, who in earlier years was commended for routing the communists, so the communists wanted to capture him.

When the communists continued to march on to win territory after territory, Luo Xianxiang left for Hong Kong, where he lived a spartan, quiet life. He died of illness in 1968 at the age of 78.

== Obituary and eulogy ==
Law Hin-Cheung (Luo Xianxiang) Passed Away.

Funeral Services and Cremation took place yesterday.

Former General and Special Envoy to Guangdong Province, China, Mr. Law Hin-Cheung, died from illness at 3 pm on 20th October, 1968 at 80 years* of age. Funeral services and viewing were held at Kowloon Funeral Parlor (Kowloon, Hong Kong). After viewing and funeral service, his body was moved to Diamond Hill Crematorium for immediate cremation. A few hundred of his former colleagues, senior officials who had served with him in China, local politicians, dignitaries, subordinates, friends and family came to salute and to pay final tribute to a man who was well known to be principled; a man who served his country with loyalty, integrity, honesty and honor. His passing was acutely felt and mourned by those who knew, respected and loved him.

— Translated by CHHistory, 1968 Chinese Daily Newspaper, Hong Kong

- In Chinese tradition, one year was added to the year of birth, and to the year of death, thus resulting age became 80, as reported in the newspaper.
Law Hin-Cheung's Eulogy 1968 in Chinese, Hong Kong
