= Baudu =

Baudu is a surname. Notable people with the surname include:

- Lucie Baudu (born 1993), French slalom canoeist
- Stéphane Baudu (born 1956), French politician

== See also ==
- Baitu (disambiguation)
