= Deqing County, Guangdong =

Deqing 德庆县 Takhing
- County
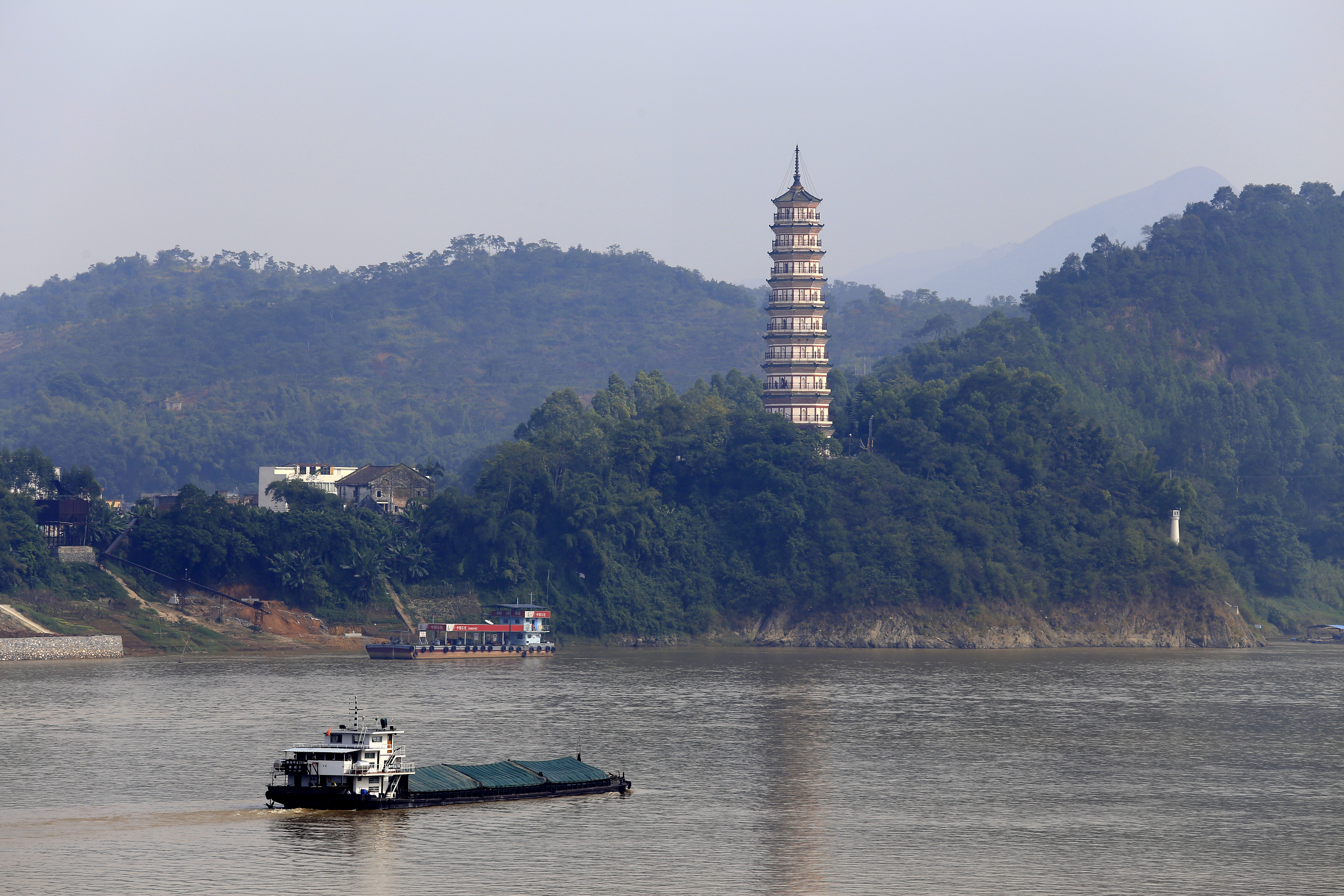
- Sanyuan Pagoda

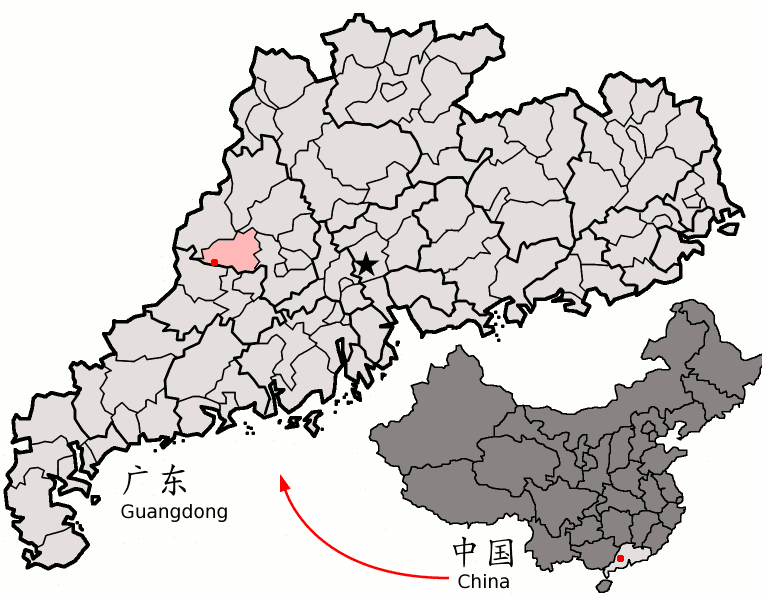
- Location in Guangdong
- Coordinates: 23.144°N 111.786°E
- Country: People's Republic of China
- Province: Guangdong
- Prefecture-level city: Zhaoqing

Area
  - Total: 2,258 km^{2} (872 sq mi)
- Time zone: UTC+8 (China Standard)

Deqing
- Traditional Chinese: 德慶
- Simplified Chinese: 德庆
- Postal: Takhing
- Literal meaning: Virtuous Celebration
Transcriptions
Standard Mandarin
- Hanyu Pinyin: Déqìng
Yue: Cantonese
- Jyutping: Dak^{1}-hing^{3}

Deqing County, formerly romanized as Takhing, (Note: The Postal Map form of the name derives from Deqing's Cantonese pronunciation. Deqing has also been romanized as Tak King.) is a county in western Guangdong province, China, under the administration of the prefecture-level city of Zhaoqing.

== History ==
Under the Qing, Deqing County made up part of the commandery of Zhaoqing.

== Administrative divisions ==
Name	Chinese (S)	Hanyu Pinyin	Population (2010)	Area (km^{2})
Decheng Subdistrict	德城街道	Déchéng Jiēdào	58,878	17.5
Xinxu town	新圩镇	Xīnxū Zhèn	23,892	138
Huilong town	回龙镇	Huílóng Zhèn	17,401	132.2
Guanxu town	官圩镇	Guānxū Zhèn	30,379	292
Maxu town	马圩镇	Mǎxū Zhèn	20,214	163.75
Gaoliang town	高良镇	Gāoliáng Zhèn	28,944	300
Mocun town	莫村镇	Mòcūn Zhèn	28,625	300
Yongfeng town	永丰镇	Yǒngfēng Zhèn	19,924	160
Wulong town	武垄镇	Wǔlǒng Zhèn	14,207	136
Bozhi town	播植镇	Bōzhí Zhèn	15,308	115.3
Fengcun town	凤村镇	Fèngcūn Zhèn	27,344	160
Yuecheng town	悦城镇	Yuèchéng Zhèn	31,544	221
Jiushi town	九市镇	Jiǔshì Zhèn	24,551	152.6

- Defunct: Shapang Town & Guyou Town

== Sights ==
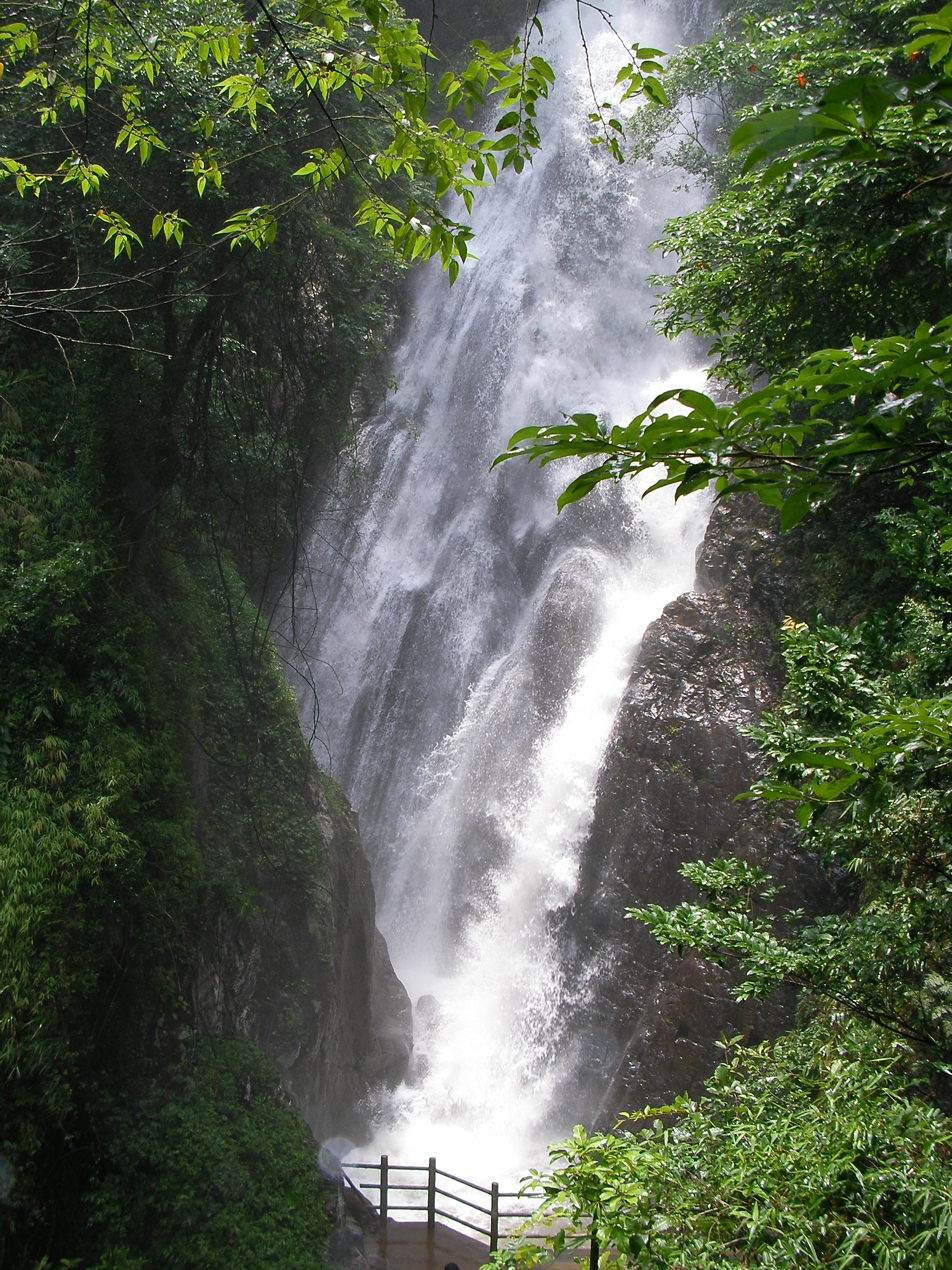
Panlongxia Waterfall

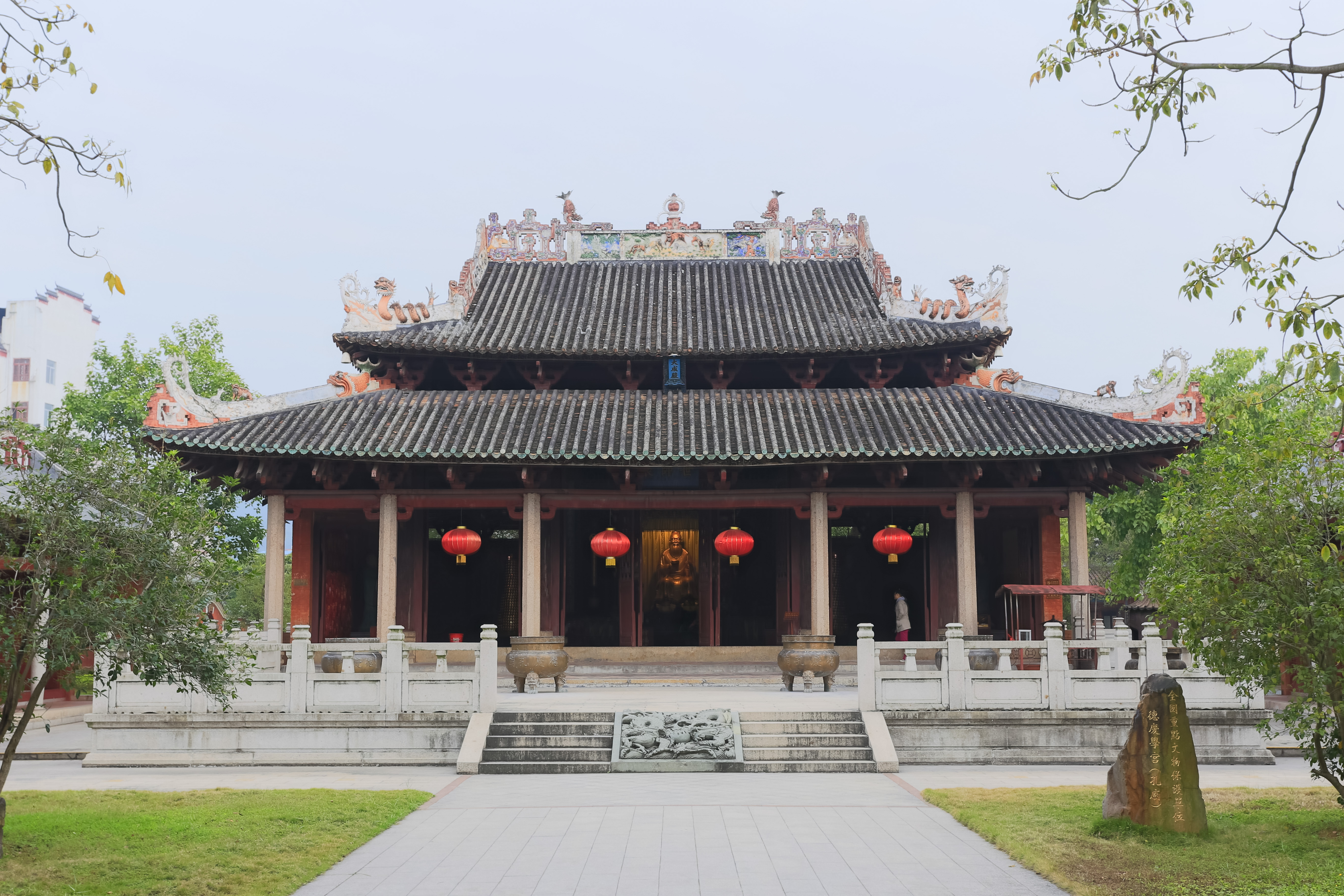
Deqing Confucian Temple

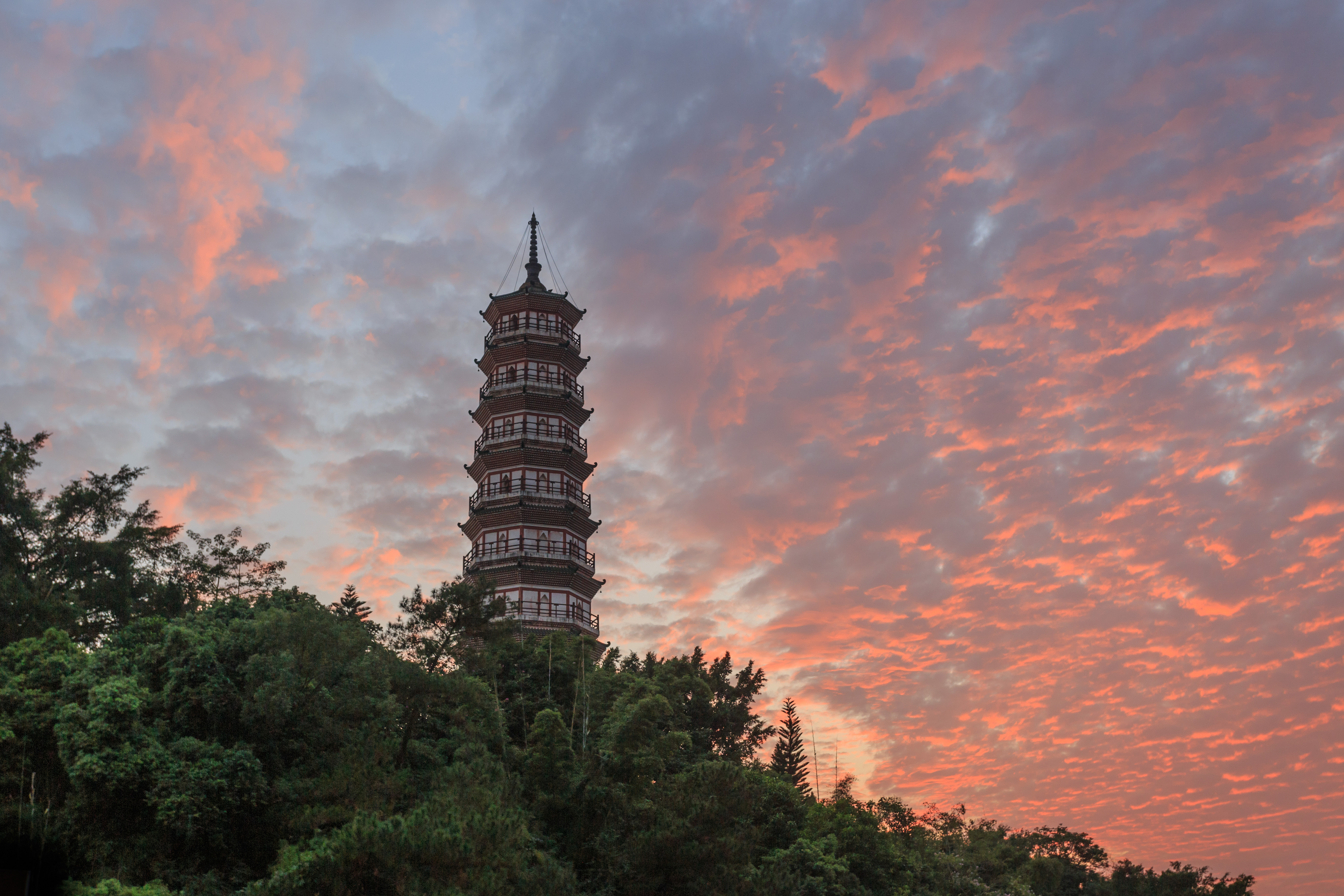
Sanyuan Pagoda

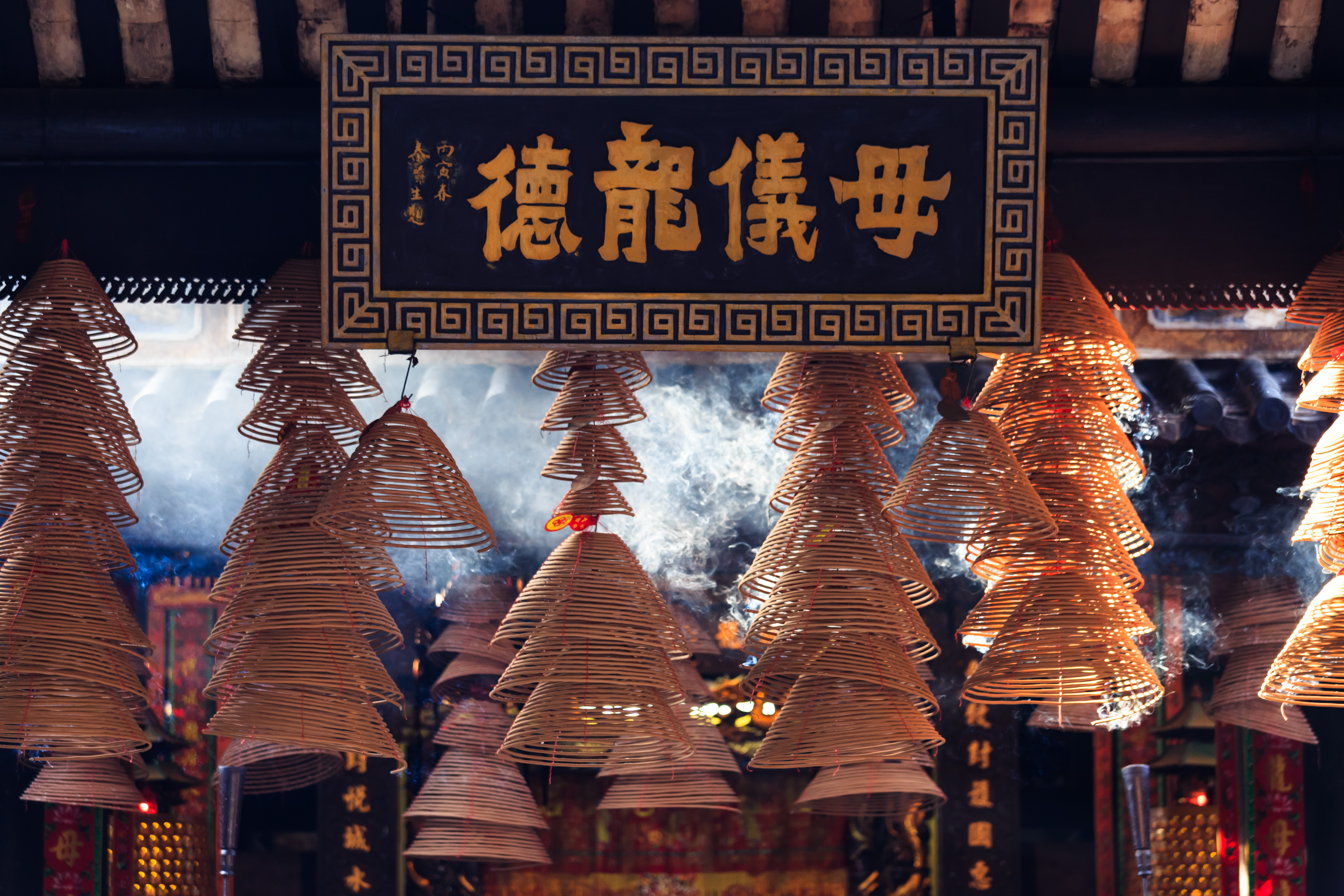
Longmu Temple in Yuecheng

== Climate ==
Climate data for Deqing, elevation 47 m (154 ft), (1991–2020 normals, extremes 1981–present)
Month	Jan	Feb	Mar	Apr	May	Jun	Jul	Aug	Sep	Oct	Nov	Dec	Year
Record high °C (°F)	29.6 (85.3)	33.0 (91.4)	33.8 (92.8)	36.3 (97.3)	37.9 (100.2)	38.3 (100.9)	39.2 (102.6)	39.5 (103.1)	38.4 (101.1)	36.8 (98.2)	33.6 (92.5)	29.9 (85.8)	39.5 (103.1)
Mean daily maximum °C (°F)	18.0 (64.4)	19.9 (67.8)	22.4 (72.3)	27.1 (80.8)	30.8 (87.4)	32.9 (91.2)	34.0 (93.2)	33.8 (92.8)	32.3 (90.1)	29.4 (84.9)	25.2 (77.4)	20.2 (68.4)	27.2 (80.9)
Daily mean °C (°F)	12.9 (55.2)	15.1 (59.2)	18.2 (64.8)	22.7 (72.9)	26.0 (78.8)	28.0 (82.4)	28.8 (83.8)	28.4 (83.1)	27.0 (80.6)	23.5 (74.3)	19.0 (66.2)	14.3 (57.7)	22.0 (71.6)
Mean daily minimum °C (°F)	9.6 (49.3)	11.9 (53.4)	15.2 (59.4)	19.7 (67.5)	22.8 (73.0)	24.8 (76.6)	25.3 (77.5)	25.1 (77.2)	23.5 (74.3)	19.6 (67.3)	15.0 (59.0)	10.4 (50.7)	18.6 (65.4)
Record low °C (°F)	−2.2 (28.0)	2.3 (36.1)	1.8 (35.2)	9.0 (48.2)	13.1 (55.6)	16.9 (62.4)	20.9 (69.6)	21.3 (70.3)	15.5 (59.9)	7.3 (45.1)	2.8 (37.0)	−1.8 (28.8)	−2.2 (28.0)
Average precipitation mm (inches)	58.4 (2.30)	49.9 (1.96)	103.1 (4.06)	166.6 (6.56)	247.7 (9.75)	243.8 (9.60)	171.7 (6.76)	207.6 (8.17)	127.2 (5.01)	59.7 (2.35)	47.5 (1.87)	40.1 (1.58)	1,523.3 (59.97)
Average precipitation days (≥ 0.1 mm)	9.0	10.1	14.8	15.8	18.4	19.6	16.2	16.5	12.2	5.8	6.1	6.8	151.3
Average relative humidity (%)	80	81	83	83	82	83	80	82	81	78	78	77	81
Mean monthly sunshine hours	90.8	79.5	64.1	88.9	134.3	160.8	204.5	193.7	177.1	182.7	149.0	129.3	1,654.7
Percentage possible sunshine	27	25	17	23	33	40	50	49	49	51	45	39	37
Source: China Meteorological Administrationall-time record lowall-time May record highall-time October record

== Geology ==
In 2025, researchers confirmed that a mountaintop crater in Deqing County is the result of an impact event estimated to have occurred during the Holocene-era, less than 11,700 years ago. The crater is the largest known impact crater stemming from an impact during the Holocene era.
