= Bozhi =

Bozhi may refer to following individuals whose name can be transliterated to Hanzi pronounced by Hanyu Pinyin:

- 博之 (bózhī), a masculine Japanese given name
- 博志 (bózhì), a Chinese given name for Taiwanese economist Chen Po-chih (born 1949)
- 栢芝 (bózhī), a Chinese given name for Hong Kong actress and singer Cecilia Cheung (born 1980)
