= Sihui =

Sihui 四会市
- County-level city
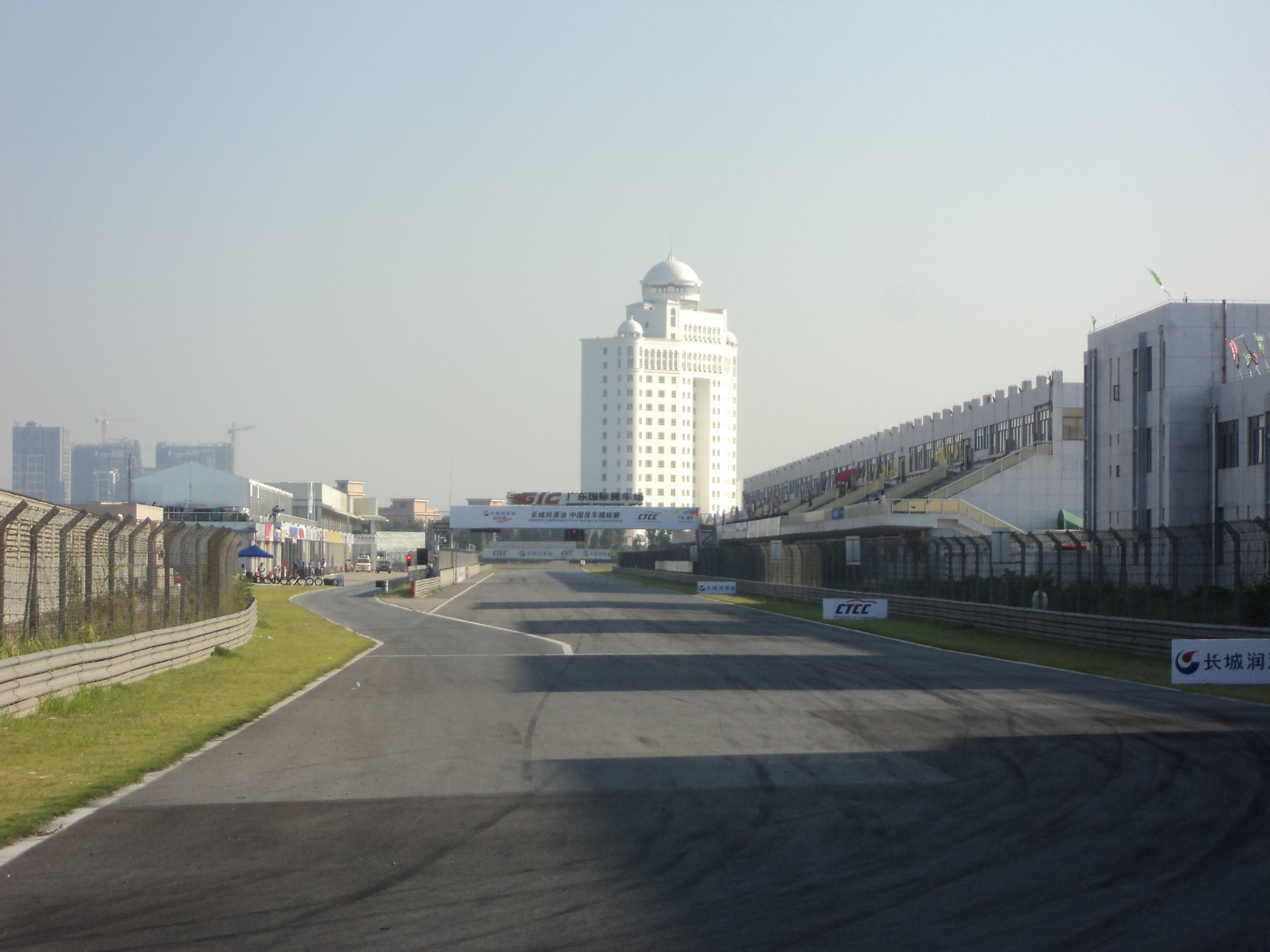

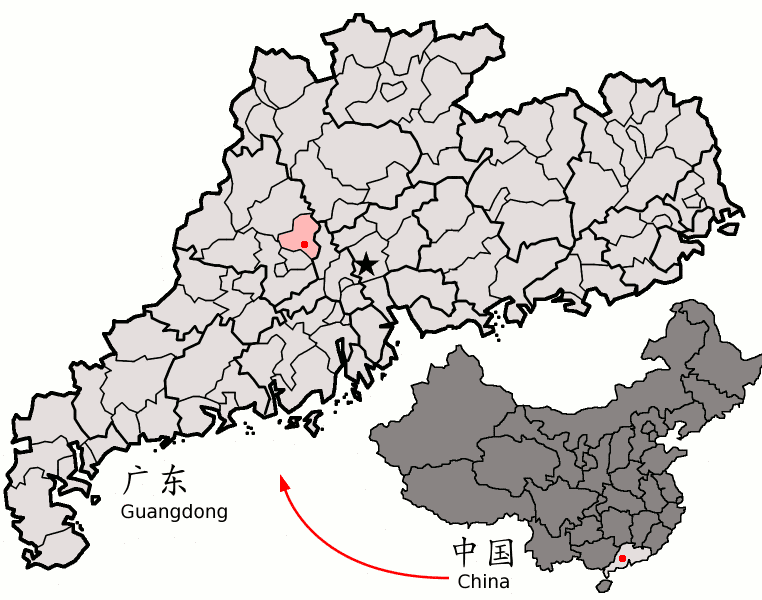
- Location of Sihui City (pink) jurisdiction in Guangdong

- Location of the city centre in Guangdong
- Coordinates: 23°19′35″N 112°44′02″E
- Country: People's Republic of China
- Province: Guangdong
- Prefecture-level city: Zhaoqing

Area
  - Total: 1,258 km^{2} (486 sq mi)

Population (2020 census)
  - Total: 640,910
  - Density: 509.5/km^{2} (1,320/sq mi)
- Time zone: UTC+8 (China Standard)
- Postal code: 526200
- Area code: 0758
- License plate prefixes: 粤H
- Website: Official website

Sihui
- Simplified Chinese: 四会
- Traditional Chinese: 四會
- Hanyu Pinyin: Sìhuì
- Cantonese Yale: Seiwúih
- Postal: Szewui
Transcriptions
Standard Mandarin
- Hanyu Pinyin: Sìhuì
- Bopomofo: ㄙˋ ㄏㄨㄟˋ
- Gwoyeu Romatzyh: Syhhuey
- Wade–Giles: Ssŭ^{4}-hui^{4}
- Yale Romanization: Sz̀hwèi
- IPA: [sɹ̩̂.xwêɪ]
Yue: Cantonese
- Yale Romanization: Seiwúih
- Jyutping: Sei3wui5
- IPA: [sej˧.wuj˩˧]

Sihui (Chinese: 四会), formerly romanized as Szewui, (Note: Sihui has also been romanized as Sze Hwuy.) is a county-level city in the west of the Pearl River Delta region in Guangdong province, China. It is administered as part of the prefecture-level city of Zhaoqing. Sihui's population is 640,910 in 2020.

== History ==
Sihui was initially established during the Qin dynasty (221 BC—207 BC), some historians suggested Sihui first appeared during the Western Han dynasty (206 BC—8 AD), and it is one of the four most ancient counties in Guangdong province (the other three counties are Panyu county, Jieyang county and Longchuan county). Under the Qing, Sihui County made up part of the commandery of Zhaoqing. As with much of the surrounding countryside, Sihui was a source for many members of the Chinese diaspora during the late Qing.

== Administrative divisions ==
Name	Chinese (S)	Hanyu Pinyin	Population (2010)	Area (km^{2})
Chengzhong Subdistrict	城中街道	Chéngzhōng Jiēdào	101,428	46
Dongcheng Subdistrict	东城街道	Dōngchéng Jiēdào	142,577	84
Zhenshan Subdistrict	贞山街道	Zhēnshān Jiēdào	35,922	100.68
Longfu town	龙甫镇	Lóngfǔ Zhèn	17,979	103
Dedou town	地豆镇	Dedòu Zhèn	18,351	89.7
Weizheng town	威整镇	Wēizhěng Zhèn	12,047	63.9
Luoyuan town	罗源镇	Luōyuán Zhèn	5,945	26
Jingkou town	迳口镇	Jìngkǒu Zhèn	12,669	101
Dasha town	大沙镇	Dàshā Zhèn	46,120	80
Shigou town	石狗镇	Shígǒu Zhèn	16,170	142
Huangtian town	黄田镇	Huángtián Zhèn	10,743	89.6
Jianggu town	江谷镇	Xiàmáo Zhèn	27,177	82.4
Xiamao town	下茆镇	Jiānggǔ Zhèn	24,579	107.5

== Economy ==
The Zhaoqing High Technology Industrial Development Zone (肇庆高新区 and 肇庆国家高新技术产业开发区) is located in Sihui.

== Climate ==
Climate data for Sihui, elevation 40 m (130 ft), (1991–2020 normals, extremes 1963–present)
Month	Jan	Feb	Mar	Apr	May	Jun	Jul	Aug	Sep	Oct	Nov	Dec	Year
Record high °C (°F)	28.7 (83.7)	31.6 (88.9)	33.6 (92.5)	34.4 (93.9)	39.2 (102.6)	37.9 (100.2)	39.3 (102.7)	38.5 (101.3)	37.8 (100.0)	35.7 (96.3)	33.7 (92.7)	30.0 (86.0)	39.3 (102.7)
Mean daily maximum °C (°F)	17.4 (63.3)	19.8 (67.6)	21.7 (71.1)	26.0 (78.8)	30.2 (86.4)	32.8 (91.0)	33.9 (93.0)	33.8 (92.8)	32.3 (90.1)	28.8 (83.8)	24.3 (75.7)	19.1 (66.4)	26.7 (80.0)
Daily mean °C (°F)	12.7 (54.9)	15.3 (59.5)	17.8 (64.0)	21.8 (71.2)	25.7 (78.3)	27.9 (82.2)	28.8 (83.8)	28.3 (82.9)	27.0 (80.6)	23.2 (73.8)	19.1 (66.4)	13.8 (56.8)	21.8 (71.2)
Mean daily minimum °C (°F)	9.6 (49.3)	12.3 (54.1)	15.2 (59.4)	19.0 (66.2)	22.7 (72.9)	24.8 (76.6)	25.4 (77.7)	25.0 (77.0)	23.8 (74.8)	19.7 (67.5)	15.7 (60.3)	10.5 (50.9)	18.6 (65.6)
Record low °C (°F)	−1.2 (29.8)	1.3 (34.3)	2.4 (36.3)	8.0 (46.4)	13.3 (55.9)	17.5 (63.5)	21.3 (70.3)	21.9 (71.4)	15.1 (59.2)	9.0 (48.2)	4.2 (39.6)	−0.6 (30.9)	−1.2 (29.8)
Average precipitation mm (inches)	61.1 (2.41)	58.2 (2.29)	121.8 (4.80)	179.6 (7.07)	248.0 (9.76)	300.7 (11.84)	247.7 (9.75)	253.2 (9.97)	171.8 (6.76)	77.8 (3.06)	54.0 (2.13)	42.8 (1.69)	1,816.7 (71.53)
Average precipitation days (≥ 0.1 mm)	9.0	11.4	17.3	16.9	19.2	20.4	16.7	16.9	11.7	5.5	6.7	6.7	158.4
Average relative humidity (%)	78	80	85	85	84	85	82	83	81	76	75	74	81
Mean monthly sunshine hours	101.9	74.4	56.7	73.9	118.3	140.1	190.1	186.6	179.1	191.2	158.5	141.2	1,612
Percentage possible sunshine	30	23	15	19	29	35	46	47	49	54	48	43	37
Source: China Meteorological Administration all-time May and July (and all time extreme) temperatures all-time record low

== Notable people ==
- Luo Xian Xiang (1890–1968), World War II general
- Joseph Tse tsz Fung: Hong Kong journalist and writer, Joseph now resides in Canada (source: Wikipedia)
- Irene Wan bik ha: Hong Kong actress and film producer
- Hera Chan Hiu Wah: champion of Miss Hong Kong pageant 2018, actress of Hong Kong TVB corporation limited

== See also ==
- Guangdong International Circuit
- Wangtang, a village in Jianggu, Sihui
