= Duanzhou, Zhaoqing =

District of Zhaoqing

Duanzhou 端州区
- District
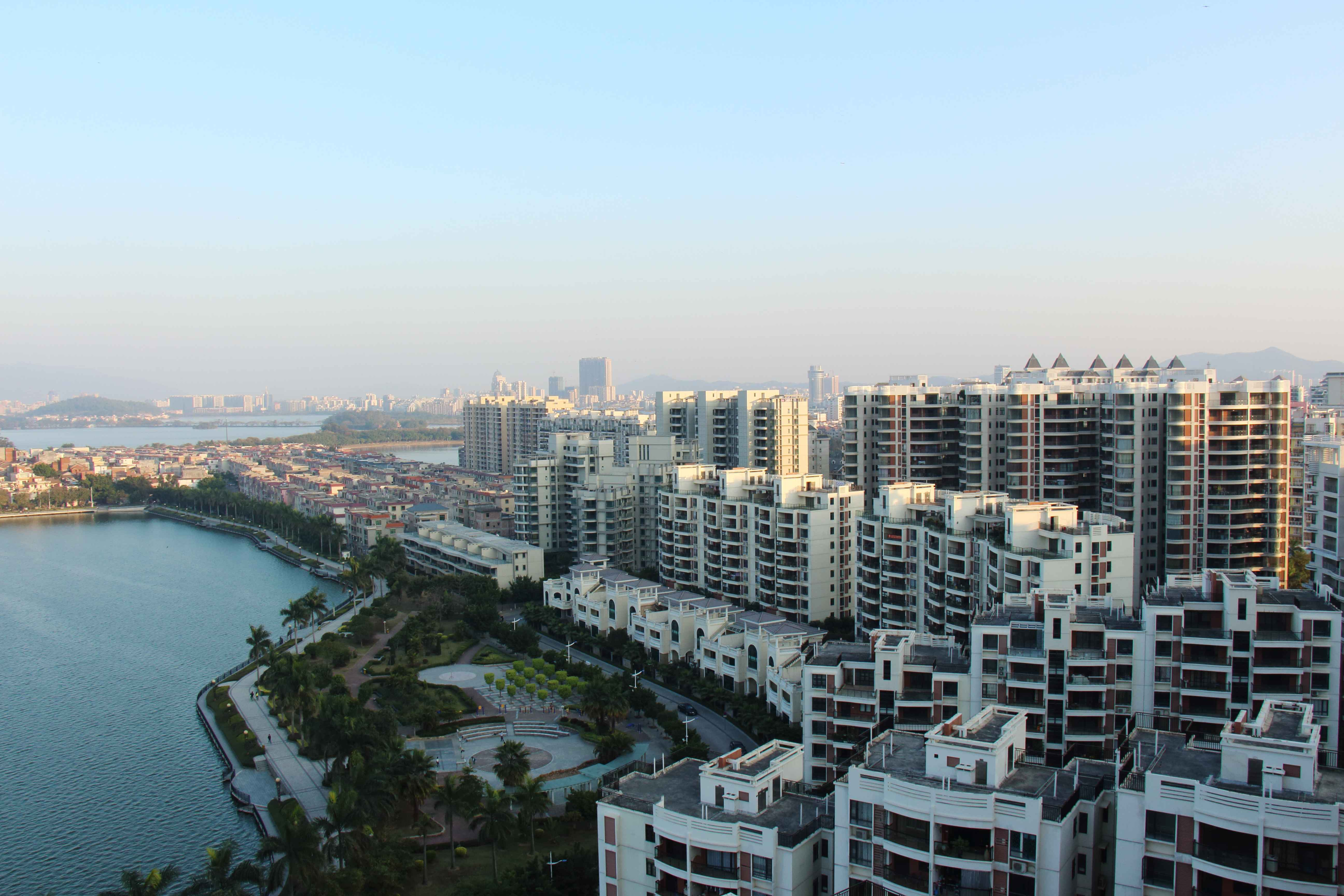

- Location in Guangdong
- Coordinates: 23°03′14.4″N 112°28′46.1″E
- Country: People's Republic of China
- Province: Guangdong
- Prefecture-level city: Zhaoqing

Area
  - Total: 152.3 km^{2} (58.8 sq mi)

Population (2020 census)
  - Total: 602,402
  - Density: 3,955/km^{2} (10,240/sq mi)
- Time zone: UTC+8 (China Standard)

Duanzhou District (Chinese: 端州; pinyin: Duānzhōu; Jyutping: dyun^{1}zau^{1}) is a district of Zhaoqing, Guangdong province, People's Republic of China. Duanzhou is the urban center of Zhaoqing.

== Administrative divisions ==
Name	Chinese (S)	Hanyu Pinyin	Population (2010)	Area (km^{2})
Chengdong Subdistrict	城东街道	Chéngdōng Jiēdào	212,718	17.8
Chengxi Subdistrict	城西街道	Chéngxī Jiēdào	114,837	10.3
Huanggang Subdistrict	黄岗街道	Huánggǎng Jiēdào	88,272	78
Mugang Subdistrict	睦岗街道	Mùgǎng Jiēdào	63,515	59.5

- Defunct: Chengbei Subdistrict and Chengnan Subdistrict
