= Zhaoqing =

Zhaoqing 肇庆市 Shiuhing
- Prefecture-level city
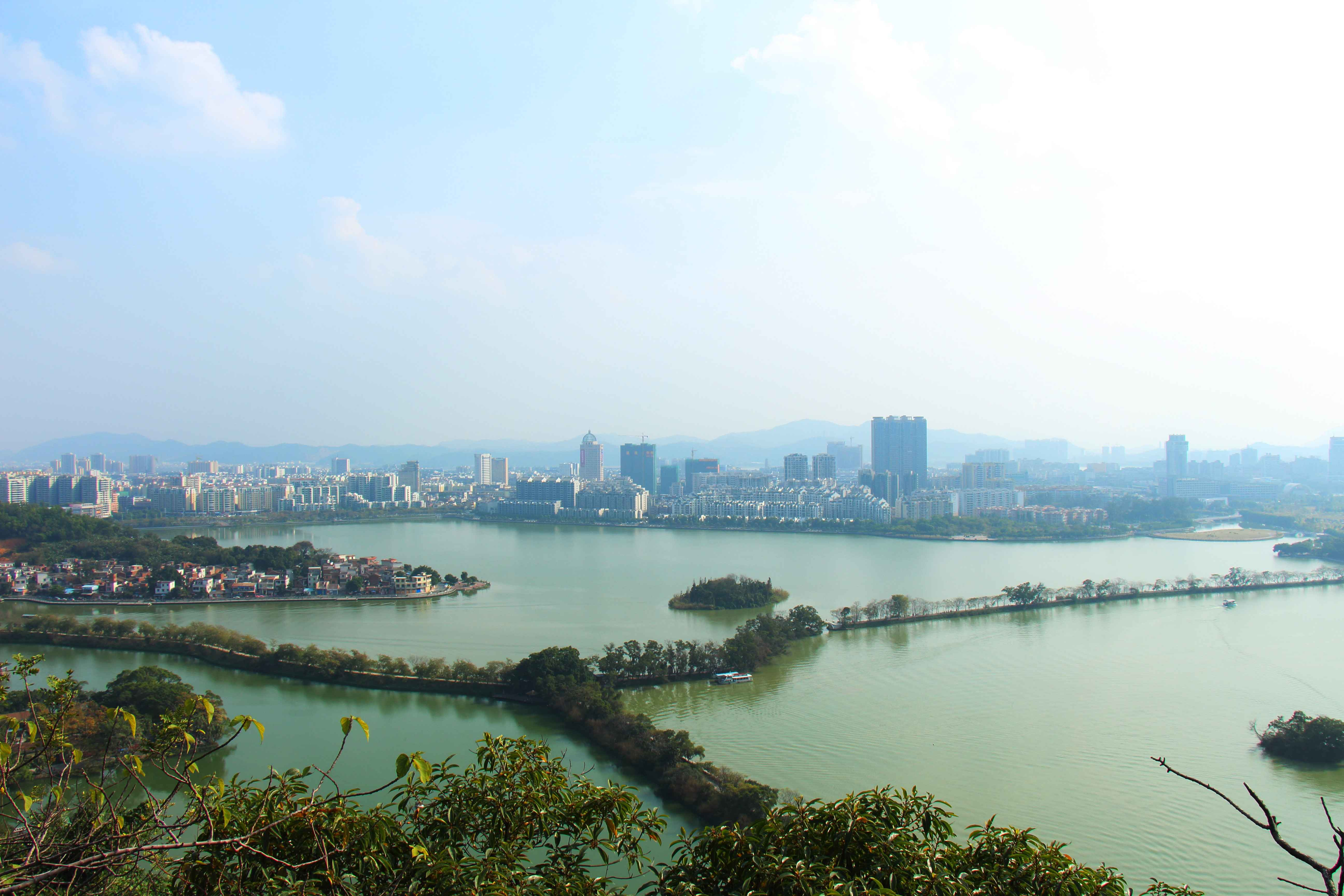
- Panoramic view of Duanzhou District from Seven Star Crags

- Location of Zhaoqing City jurisdiction in Guangdong
- Interactive map of Zhaoqing
- Location of the city center in Guangdong Zhaoqing (China)
- Coordinates (Zhaoqing government): 23°03′N 112°28′E
- Country: People's Republic of China
- Province: Guangdong
- County-level divisions: 8
- Municipal seat: Duanzhou District

Area
  - Prefecture-level city: 14,891.23 km^{2} (5,749.54 sq mi)
  - Urban: 2,892 km^{2} (1,117 sq mi)
  - Metro: 2,892 km^{2} (1,117 sq mi)
- Elevation: 12 m (39 ft)

Population (2020 census)
  - Prefecture-level city: 4,113,594
  - Density: 276.2427/km^{2} (715.4654/sq mi)
  - Urban: 1,553,109
  - Urban density: 537.0/km^{2} (1,391/sq mi)
  - Metro: 1,553,109
  - Metro density: 537.0/km^{2} (1,391/sq mi)

GDP
  - Prefecture-level city: CN¥ 265 billion US$ 41 billion
  - Per capita: CN¥ 64,269; US$ 9,962
- Time zone: UTC+8 (China Standard)
- Postal code: 526000
- Area code: 0758
- ISO 3166 code: CN-GD-12
- License Plate: 粤H
- Major Nationalities: Han
- Website: Zhaoqing official site

Zhaoqing
- "Zhaoqing" in Simplified (top) and Traditional (bottom) Chinese characters
- Simplified Chinese: 肇庆
- Traditional Chinese: 肇慶
- Hanyu Pinyin: Zhàoqìng
- Cantonese Yale: Siuhhing
- Postal: Shiuhing
- Literal meaning: "Beginning Auspiciousness"
Transcriptions
Standard Mandarin
- Hanyu Pinyin: Zhàoqìng
- Bopomofo: ㄓㄠˋ ㄑㄧㄥˋ
- Gwoyeu Romatzyh: Jawchinq
- Wade–Giles: Chao^{4}-chʻing^{4}
- Yale Romanization: Jàuchìng
- IPA: [ʈʂâʊ.tɕʰîŋ]
Yue: Cantonese
- Yale Romanization: Siuhhing
- Jyutping: Siu6hing3
- IPA: [siw˨.hɪŋ˧]
Southern Min
- Hokkien POJ: Tiāu-khèng
- Tâi-lô: Tiāu-khìng

Former names

Gaoyao
- Chinese: 高要
- Hanyu Pinyin: Gāoyào
Transcriptions
Standard Mandarin
- Hanyu Pinyin: Gāoyào
- Bopomofo: ㄍㄠ ㄧㄠˋ
- Gwoyeu Romatzyh: Gauyaw
- Wade–Giles: Kao^{1}-yao^{4}
- Yale Romanization: Gāuyàu
- IPA: [káʊ.jâʊ]

Duanzhou
- Chinese: 端州
- Hanyu Pinyin: Duānzhōu
Transcriptions
Standard Mandarin
- Hanyu Pinyin: Duānzhōu
- Bopomofo: ㄉㄨㄢ ㄓㄡ
- Gwoyeu Romatzyh: Duanjou
- Wade–Giles: Tuan^{1}-chou^{1}
- Yale Romanization: Dwānjōu
- IPA: [twán.ʈʂóʊ]

Zhaoqing (Chinese: 肇庆), alternately romanized as Shiuhing, (Note: Other alternate romanizations include Shiu Hing and Shaou King.) is a prefecture-level city in Guangdong, China. As of the 2020 census, its population was 4,113,594, with 1,553,109 living in the built-up (or metro) area made of Duanzhou, Dinghu and Gaoyao. The prefectural seat—except the Seven Star Crags—is fairly flat, but thickly forested mountains lie just outside its limits. Numerous rice paddies and aquaculture ponds are found on the outskirts of the city. Sihui and the southern districts of the prefecture are considered part of the Pearl River Delta.

Formerly one of the most important cities in southern China, Zhaoqing lost its importance during the Qing dynasty and is now primarily known for tourism and as a provincial "college town". Residents from Guangzhou, Shenzhen, and the other cities of the Pearl River Delta often visit it for weekend excursions. It is also a growing manufacturing center.

== Name ==
Zhaoqing was known to the Qin as Sihui (四会) and Han as Gaoyao (高要). It was renamed Duanzhou (端州) from its role as the seat of Duan Prefecture under the Sui. The present name, meaning "Beginning Auspiciousness", was bestowed on the area by Emperor Huizong of the Song in 1118. "Zhaoqing" is the pinyin romanization; the earlier Postal Map form "Shiuhing" derives from the name's Cantonese pronunciation.

== History ==
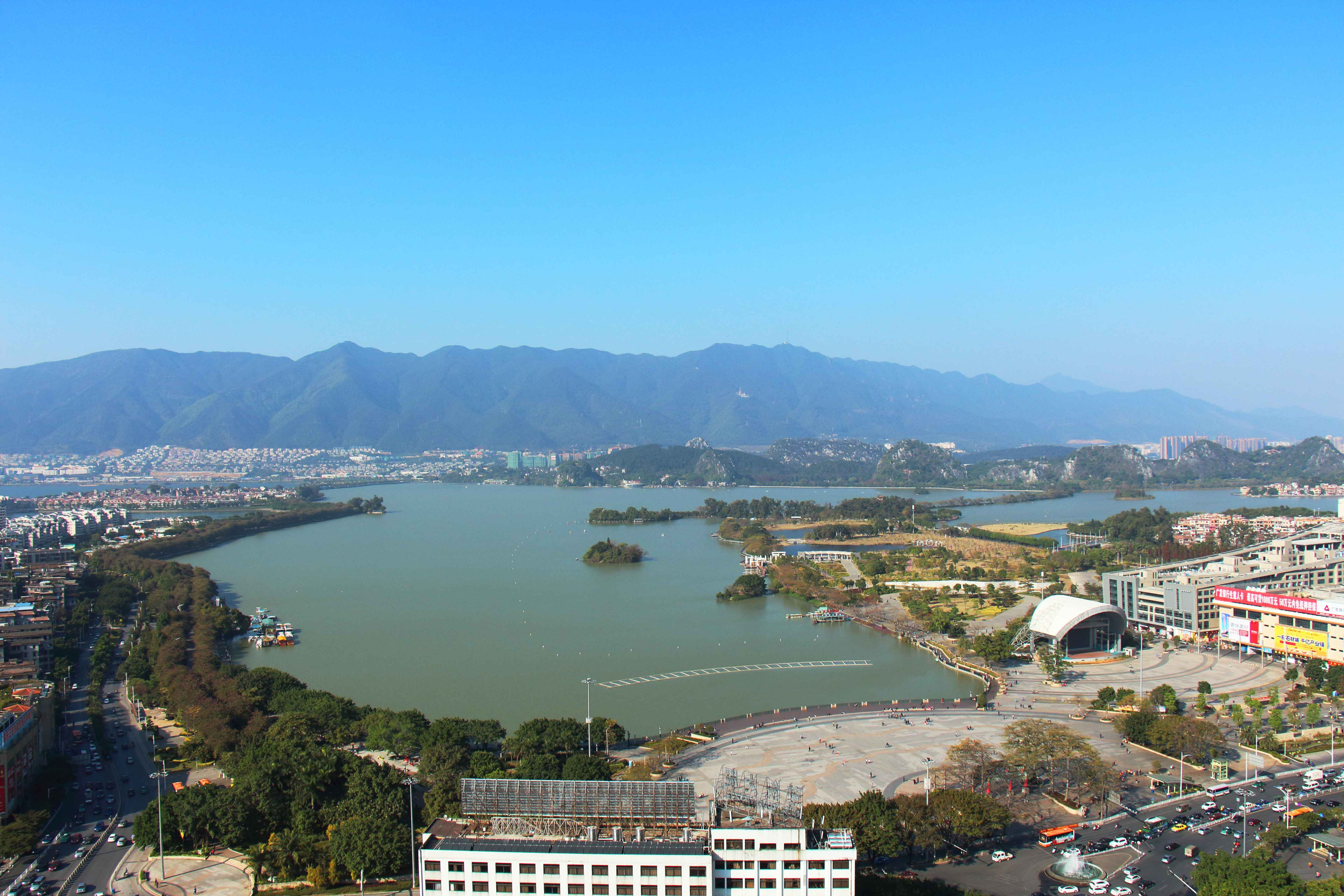
Panorama of Paifang Guangchang.

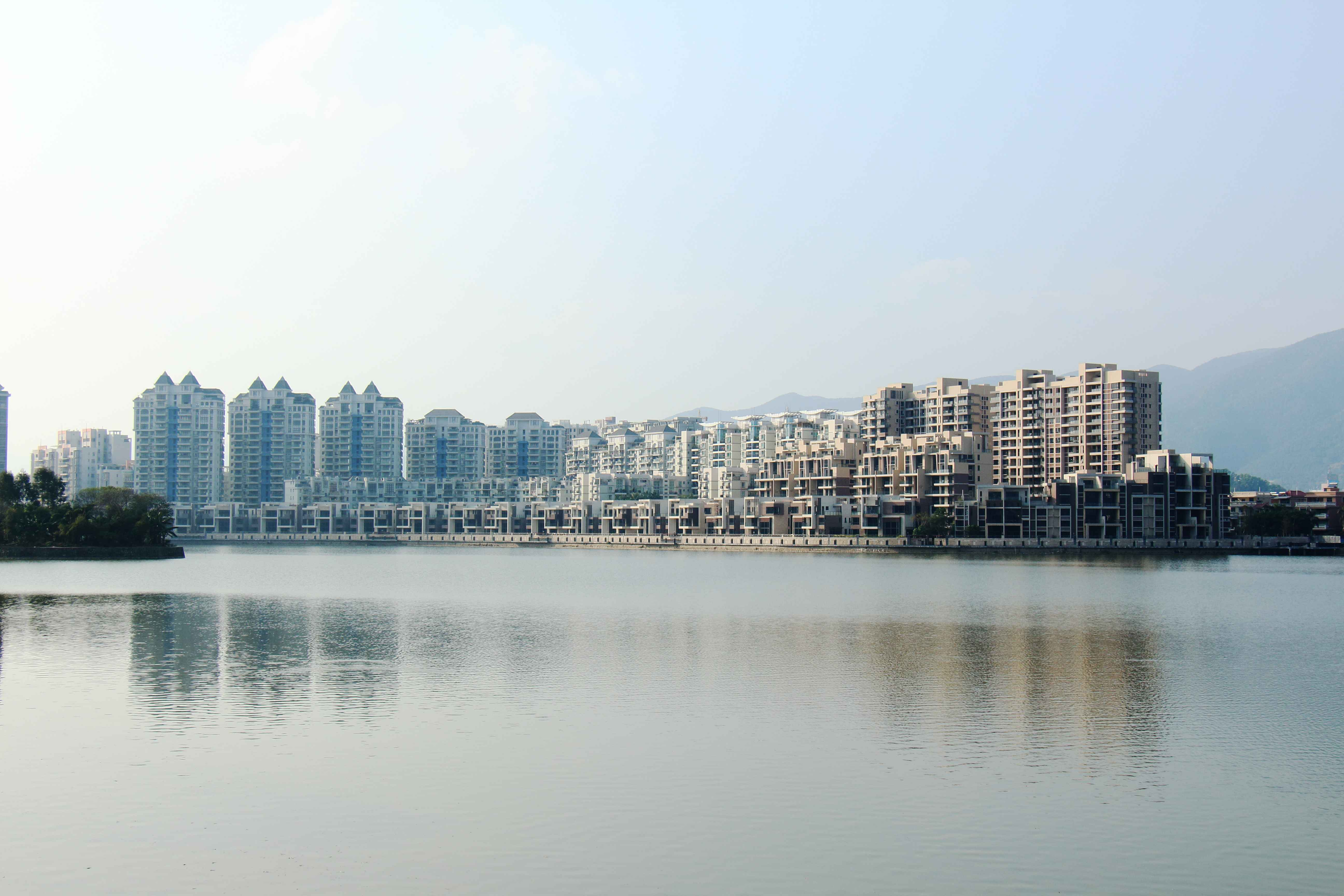
Xinshijie Huayuan residential area.

Gaoyao was located on the south bank of the Xi River, named for its district's principal feature: the river's Lingyang Gorge (then known as "Gaoyao"). In the late 6th and early 7th centuries, the administration was relocated to Duanzhou on the opposite bank of the river, which became an important administrative and military center of the southern Sui Empire.

The city wall of Zhaoqing was built in Duanzhou during the reign of Emperor Renzong of Song (1022–1063).

When the Portuguese arrived in the 16th century, Zhaoqing was still an important center, serving as the seat of the Viceroy of Liangguang (Guangdong and Guangxi). Matteo Ricci's On the Christian Expedition among the Sinae tells of the early visits of Macanese-based Europeans to Zhaoqing. The Viceroy Chen Rui (陈瑞) (Note: Matteo's "Cinsui".) summoned Macao's governor and bishop in the early 1580s, but the town sent its auditor Mattia Penella and the Italian Jesuit Michele Ruggieri in their place in 1582. After several false starts, Ruggieri and Matteo Ricci were allowed to establish their residence in the city, the first Jesuit mission house on mainland China, after Zhaoqing's governor Wang Pan learned of Ricci's skill as a mathematician and cartographer. Ricci drew the first modern Chinese map of the world in Zhaoqing in 1584. Ruggieri left for Rome in 1588 but Ricci remained until the next year, when a new viceroy expelled him from the city and obliged the Jesuits to relocate to Shaozhou (now Shaoguan).

During the Fall of the Ming in the mid-17th century, Zhaoqing served as the capital of the Prince of Gui's Southern Ming resistance, with the prince styling himself the Yongli Emperor. The town fell in 1650 and the prince relocated to Guilin and then various locations in Guangxi, Yunnan, and Kokang. The Jesuits Andreas Wolfgang Koffler and, later, Michał Boym stayed for some time at his court.

The Qing viceroy of Liangguang relocated to Guangzhou but Zhaoqing remained a commandery seat, overseeing the counties of Gaoyao, Guangning, Deqing, Sihui, and Kaijian and Fengchuan (since combined into Fengkai); Gaoming (now part of Foshan); Xinxing (now part of Yunfu); Heshan, Kaiping, and Enping (now part of Jiangmen); and Yangchun and Yangjiang (now part of Yangjiang's separate prefecture).

== Geography ==
Zhaoqing is located 110 km (68 mi) west of Guangzhou, in the west Pearl River Delta. It lies on the north shores of the Xi River, which flows from west to east, and opposite of Gaoyao. A plain area lies to the south and west of Zhaoqing, with mountains to the east and north.

=== Climate ===
The city has a monsoon-influenced humid subtropical climate (Köppen climate classification Cfa). The yearly average temperature is 22.69 °C (72.8 °F), and annual precipitation is 1,633 mm (64.3 in).

Climate data for Zhaoqing (Gaoyao District) (1991–2020 normals, extremes 1955–2010)
Month	Jan	Feb	Mar	Apr	May	Jun	Jul	Aug	Sep	Oct	Nov	Dec	Year
Record high °C (°F)	28.7 (83.7)	31.4 (88.5)	32.4 (90.3)	35.7 (96.3)	36.1 (97.0)	37.9 (100.2)	38.5 (101.3)	38.7 (101.7)	38.3 (100.9)	35.8 (96.4)	33.1 (91.6)	30.0 (86.0)	38.7 (101.7)
Mean daily maximum °C (°F)	18.9 (66.0)	20.9 (69.6)	23.5 (74.3)	27.9 (82.2)	31.3 (88.3)	33.2 (91.8)	34.2 (93.6)	33.9 (93.0)	32.3 (90.1)	29.6 (85.3)	25.6 (78.1)	20.8 (69.4)	27.7 (81.8)
Daily mean °C (°F)	13.9 (57.0)	16.0 (60.8)	19.2 (66.6)	23.4 (74.1)	26.5 (79.7)	28.2 (82.8)	28.9 (84.0)	28.6 (83.5)	27.2 (81.0)	24.2 (75.6)	19.9 (67.8)	15.2 (59.4)	22.6 (72.7)
Mean daily minimum °C (°F)	10.6 (51.1)	12.7 (54.9)	16.1 (61.0)	20.3 (68.5)	23.3 (73.9)	25.1 (77.2)	25.6 (78.1)	25.3 (77.5)	23.9 (75.0)	20.3 (68.5)	16.0 (60.8)	11.5 (52.7)	19.2 (66.6)
Record low °C (°F)	−1.0 (30.2)	1.7 (35.1)	4.4 (39.9)	9.2 (48.6)	14.9 (58.8)	19.3 (66.7)	22.7 (72.9)	20.7 (69.3)	15.9 (60.6)	10.9 (51.6)	5.3 (41.5)	1.0 (33.8)	−1.0 (30.2)
Average precipitation mm (inches)	49.1 (1.93)	47.5 (1.87)	91.9 (3.62)	176.7 (6.96)	252.6 (9.94)	280.4 (11.04)	231.5 (9.11)	208.4 (8.20)	151.8 (5.98)	60.7 (2.39)	42.2 (1.66)	36.0 (1.42)	1,628.8 (64.12)
Average precipitation days (≥ 0.1 mm)	7.9	10.3	14.8	14.9	18.0	19.7	16.8	16.0	11.8	5.0	5.5	5.9	146.6
Average relative humidity (%)	78	79	81	80	81	81	79	80	79	75	75	75	79
Mean monthly sunshine hours	99.7	75.9	58.2	77.2	124.5	147.0	191.8	183.8	173.3	182.9	156.3	140.5	1,611.1
Percentage possible sunshine	30	24	16	20	30	36	46	46	47	51	48	42	36
Source 1: China Meteorological Administrationall-time record low
Source 2: Weather China

=== Geology ===
In 2025, researchers confirmed that a mountaintop crater in Deqing County is the result of an impact event estimated to have occurred during the Holocene-era, less than 11,700 years ago. The crater is the largest known impact crater stemming from an impact during the Holocene era.

== Administration ==
Zhaoqing has jurisdiction over 3 districts, 4 counties and 1 County-level city:

Map
Name	Simplified Chinese	Hanyu Pinyin	Population (2010 census)	Area (km^{2})	Density (/km^{2})
Duanzhou District	端州区	Duānzhōu Qū	479,342	153.99	3,113
Dinghu District	鼎湖区	Dǐnghú Qū	164,690	552.39	298
Gaoyao District	高要区	Gāoyào Qū	753,120	2,185.62	345
Guangning County	广宁县	Guǎngníng Xiàn	423,941	2,455.46	173
Huaiji County	怀集县	Huáijí Xiàn	813,032	3,554.07	229
Fengkai County	封开县	Fēngkāi Xiàn	398,258	2,723.93	146
Deqing County	德庆县	Déqìng Xiàn	341,211	2,002.8	170
Sihui	四会市	Sìhuì Shì	542,873	1,262.96	430

== Economy ==
Located in the Pearl River Delta, Zhaoqing is one of the 9 prefecture-level cities in the Pearl River Delta Economic Zone (include Zhaoqing urban area, Dinghu, Gaoyao and Sihui only).

=== Primary industries ===
The rich local resources within the mountainous regions include coal, limestone, copper, lead, zinc, granite, gold, sulfur, gypsum and other minerals.

In the agriculture sector, the fertile plains yield paddy rice, sugar cane, aquatic products, fruits, rosin and cassia bark. Horticulture and farming contribute greatly to the local economy. The industries of Poultry farming and animal husbandry are also seeking to modernize their technology and management.

The forests in the mountainous regions of the city provide a rich source for herbal medicines and other materials like rosin and casia bark that are harvested from various forest plants.

=== Secondary industries ===
Food and beverages, building materials, electronics, micro bioengineering, chemicals, equipment and machinery, textile and garments are the pillar industries. Duanzhou, Gaoyao and Sihui area being developed as the export-oriented industrial bases. Yunfu is a major area for the production of sulfur and iron.

To facilitate industrial development in Zhaoqing, the local government has made great efforts in establishing various industrial zones / parks in the city. The largest one is the Guangdong Zhaoqing High-tech Industrial Development Zone, with an area of 109 km^{2} (42 sq mi), that consists of two industrial parks, Sanrong Industrial Park and Dawang Industrial Park, of areas 9 and 100 km^{2} (3.5 and 38.6 sq mi) respectively. Dawang is facilitated as an export processing and trade zone.

== Landmarks ==
A city with a long history, Zhaoqing has numerous cultural relics designated as Guangdong Provincial Cultural Relic Protection sites, six of them National Key Cultural Relic Protection Sites. Of the six, two are located in Deqing County (the Deqing Academy and the Yuecheng Longmu Ancestral Shrine) and four are located in Duanzhou District (Mei'an Temple, Zhaoqing Song City Walls, Seven Star Crags Carvings, and the Yuejiang Tower). These sites are open to the public for most of the time.

In addition to Cultural Relic Protection Sites, Zhaoqing contains many scenic attractions and landmarks, including the Xinghu Sightseeing Area, an AAAAA tourist attraction. The Xinghu Sightseeing Area is composed of the Seven Star Crags (containing the Seven Star Crags Carvings) and the Dinghu Mountain, the first established nature reserve in China. Other scenic spots include the Piyun Tower, Jiulong Lake, Baozheng Temple, Chongxi Pagoda, Zhenshan Mountain, and Panlong Gorge.

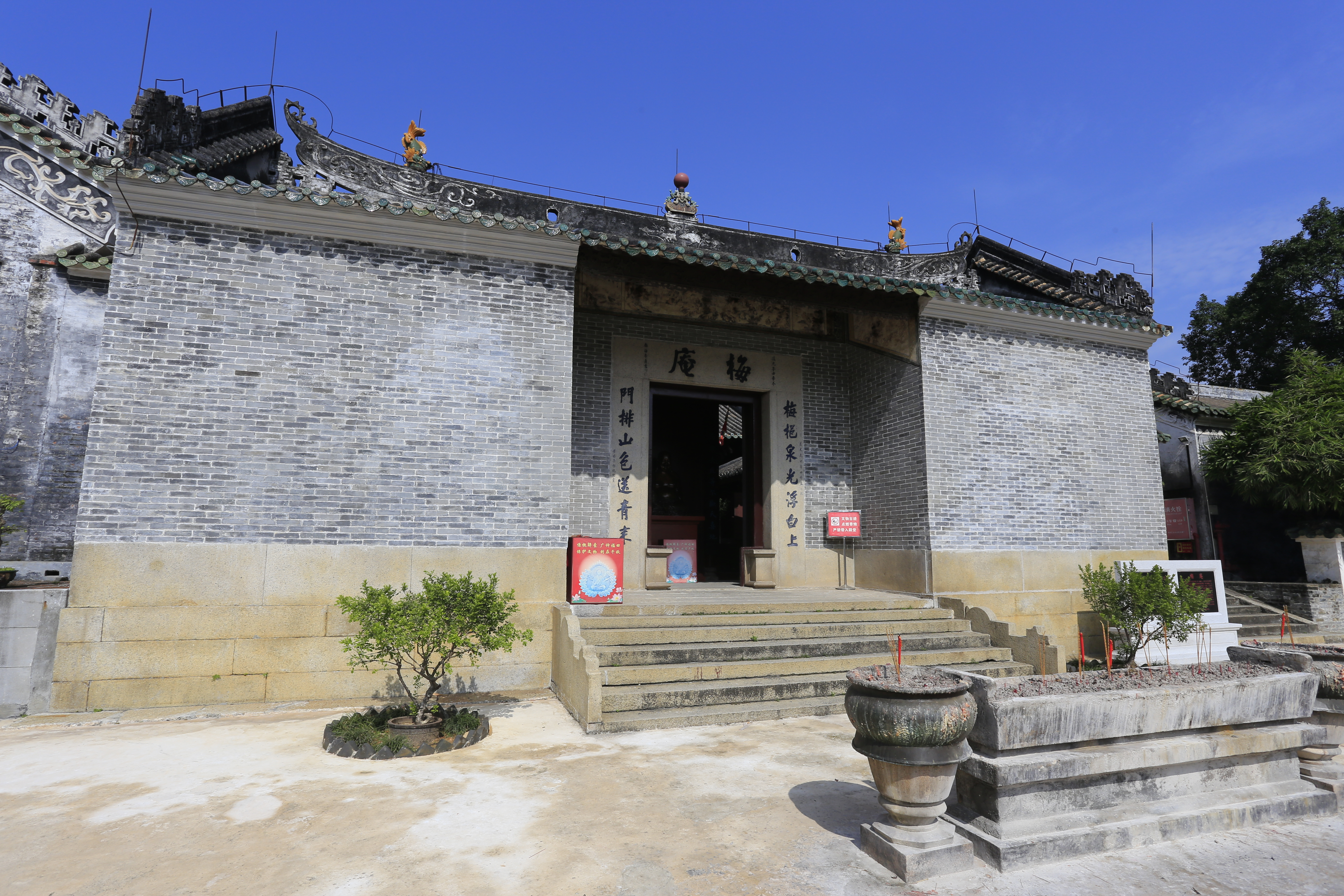
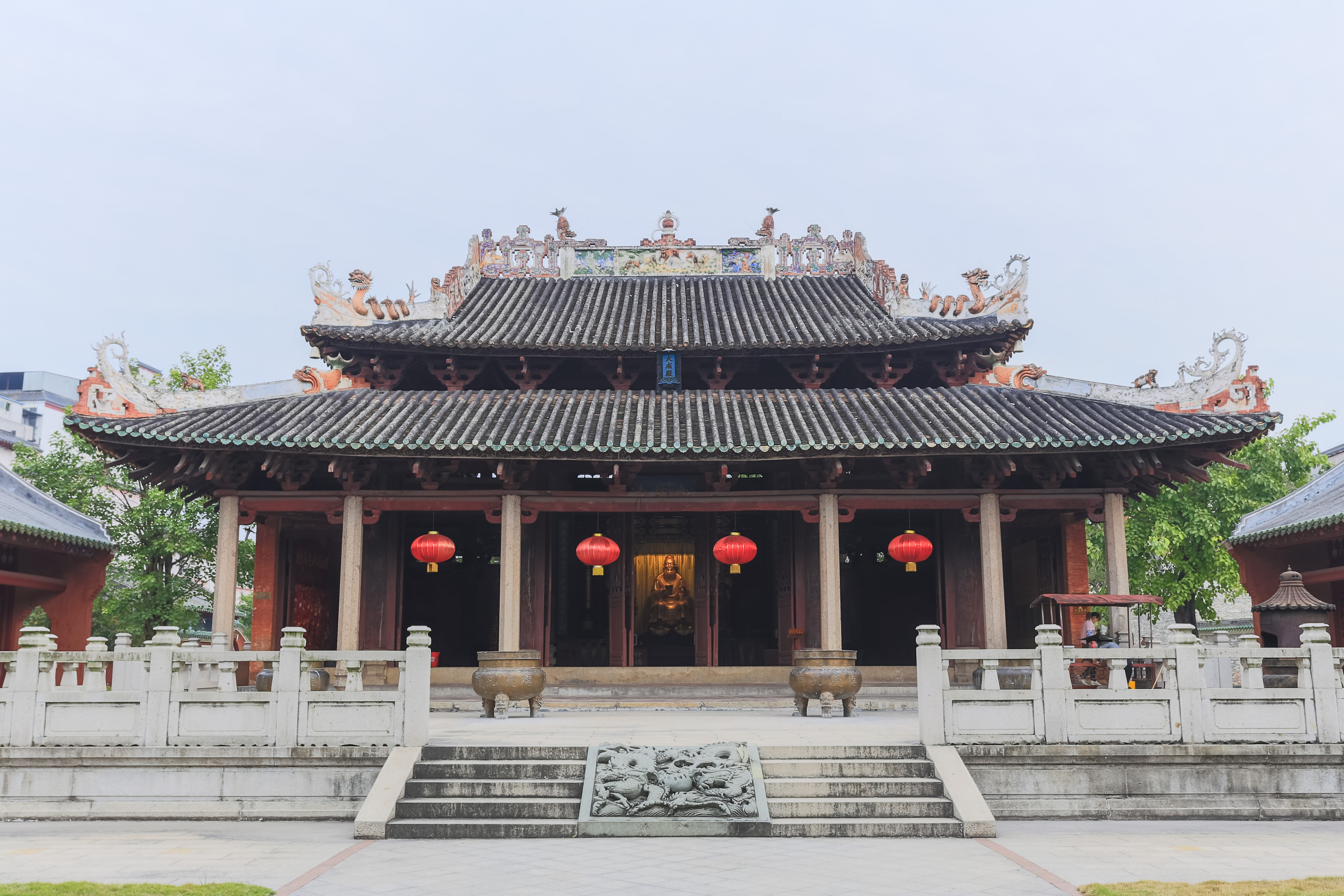
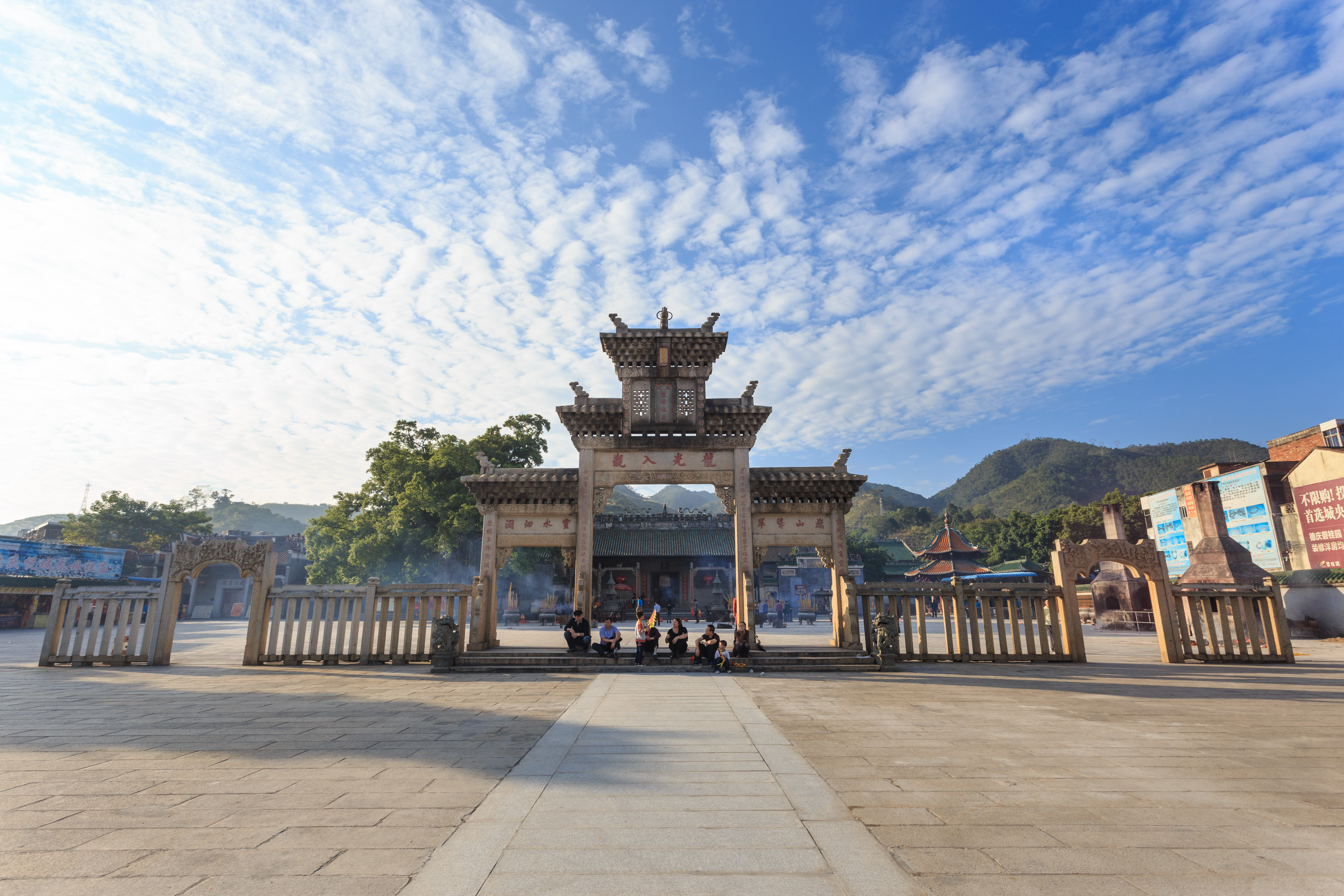
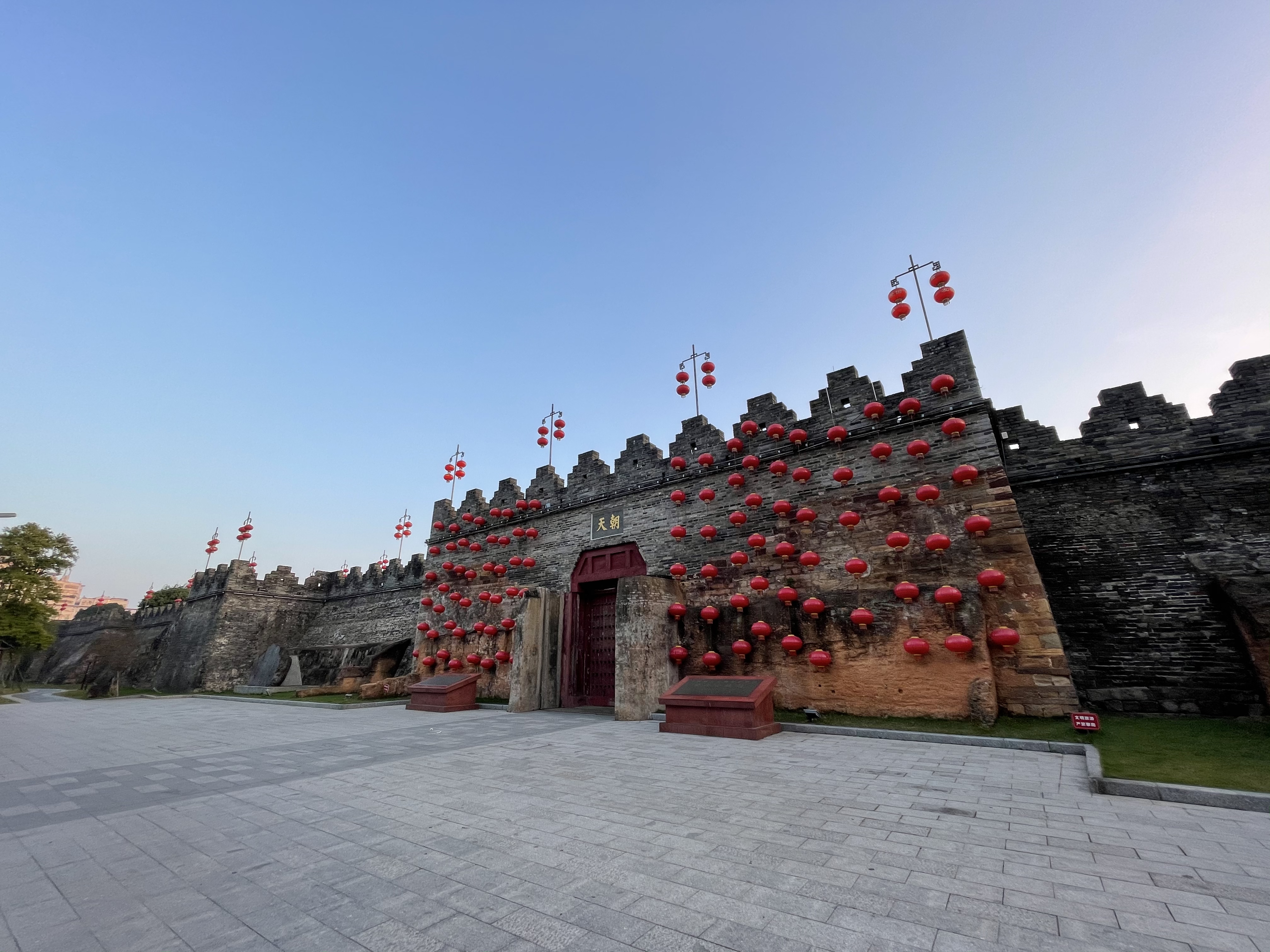
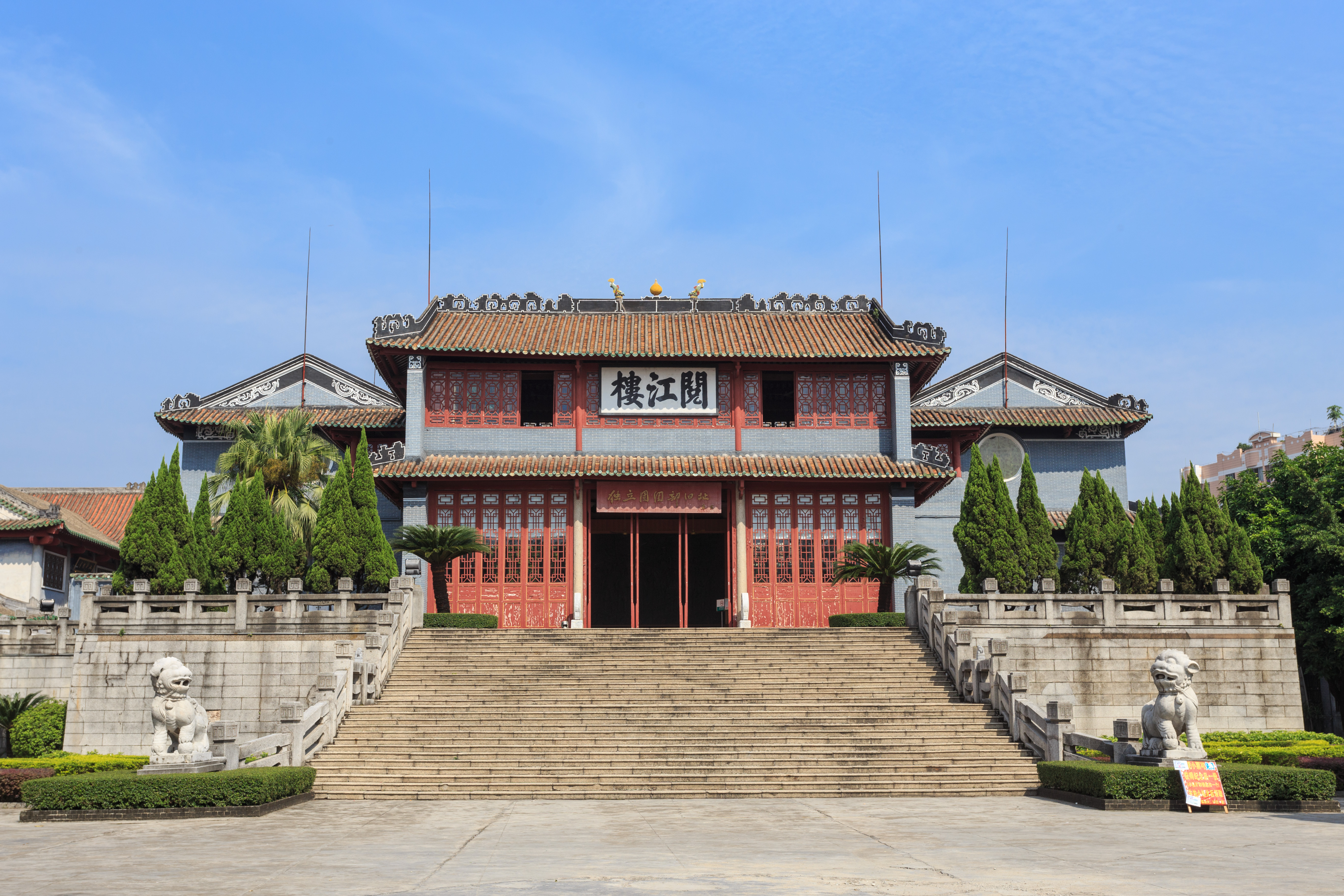
From left to right: Mei'an Temple, Deqing Academy, Yuecheng Longmu Ancestral Shrine, Zhaoqing Song City Walls, Yuejiang Tower.

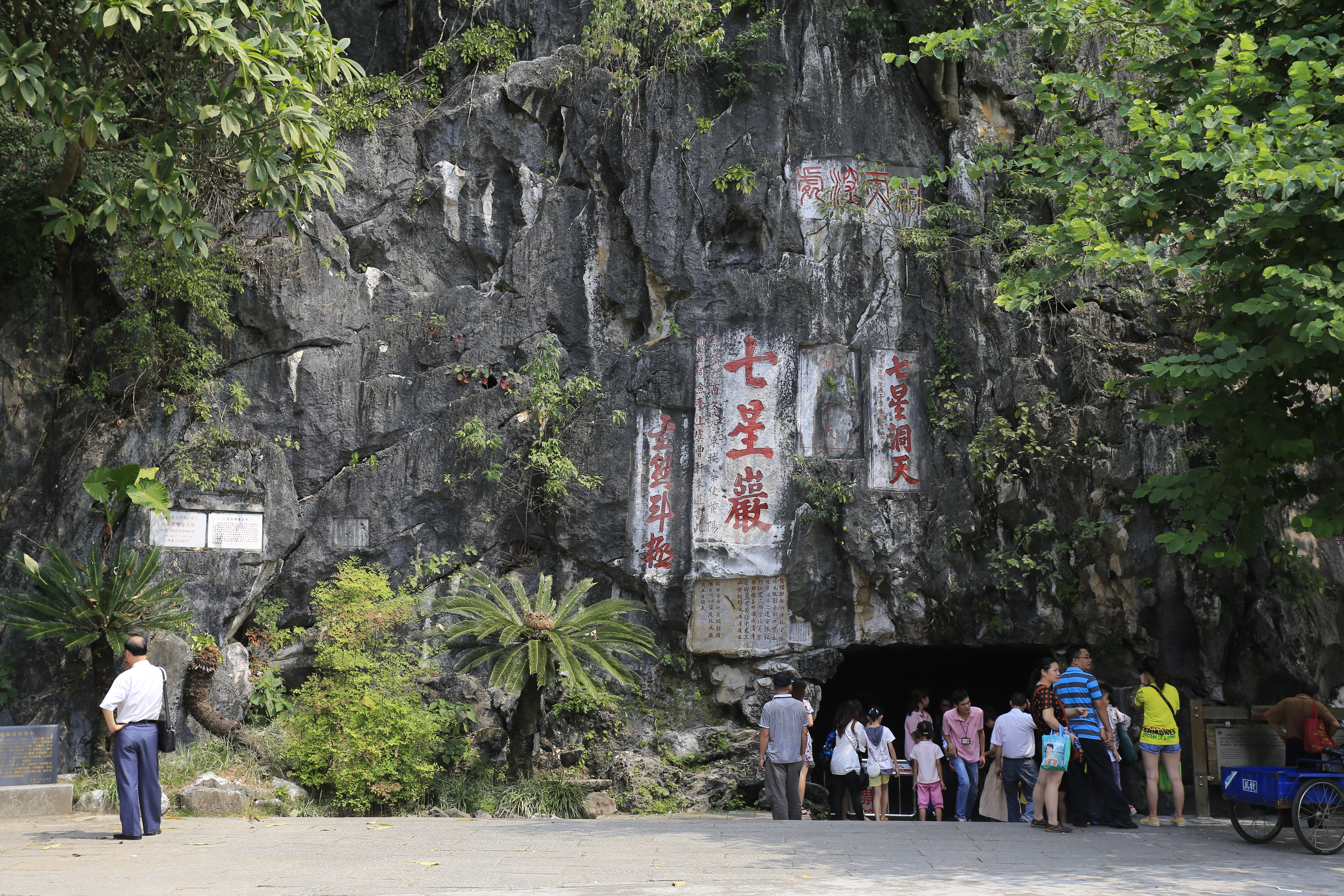
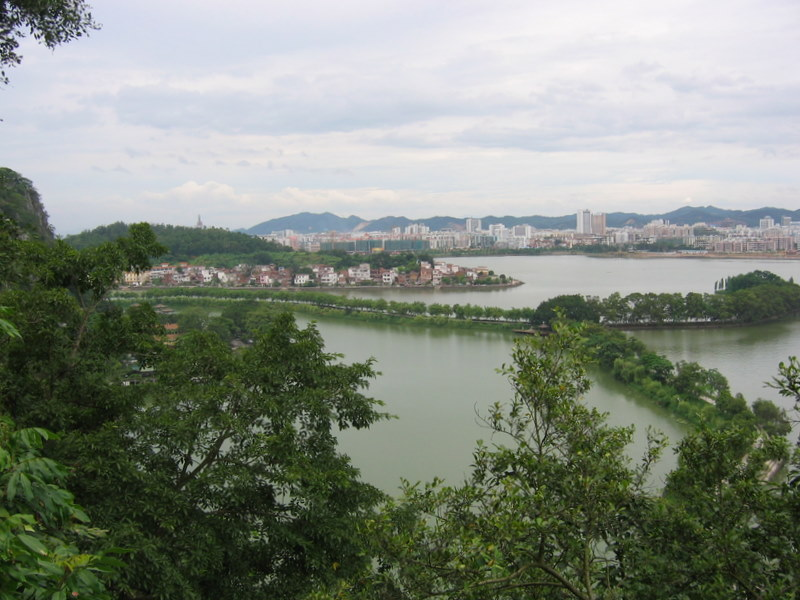
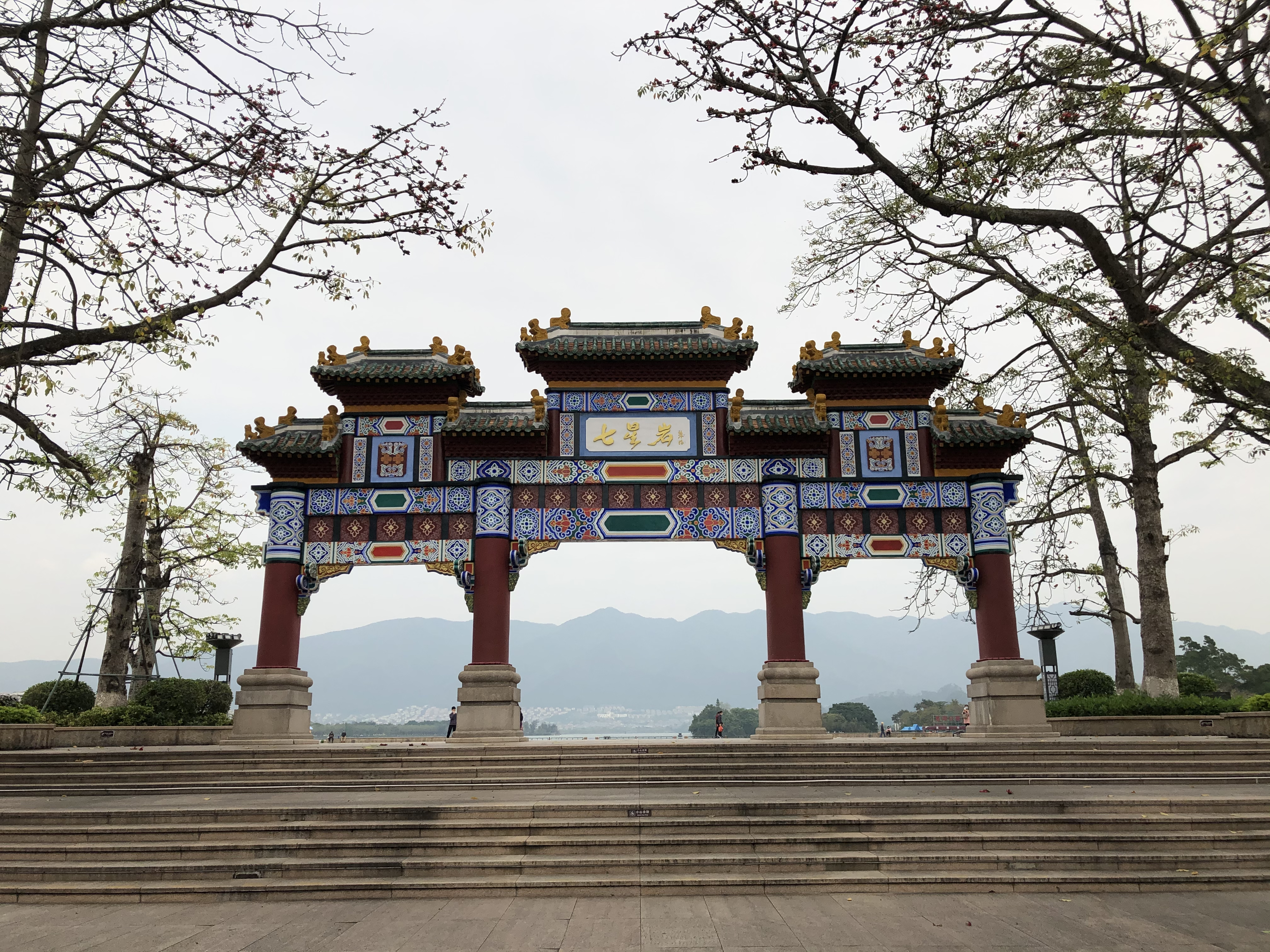
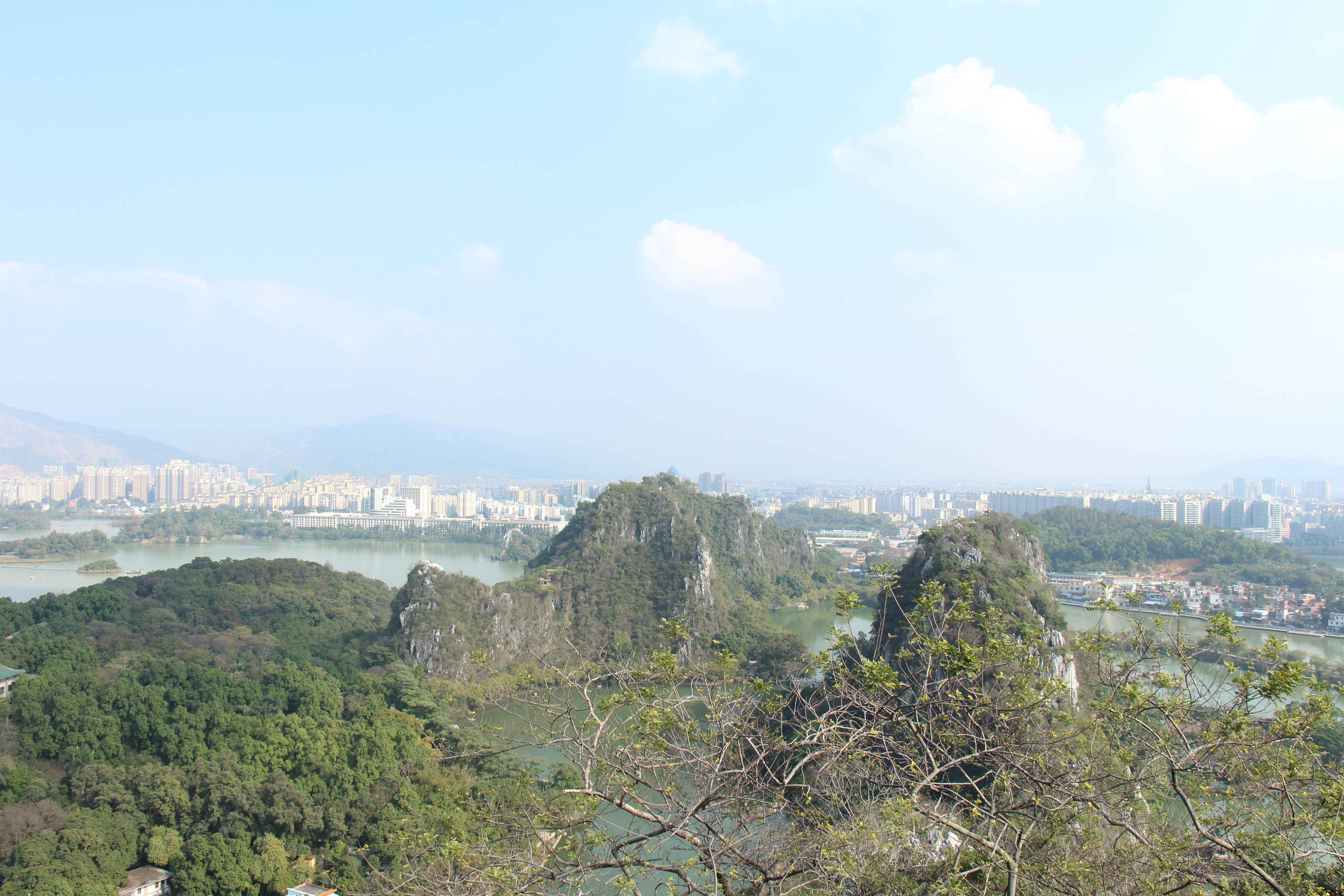
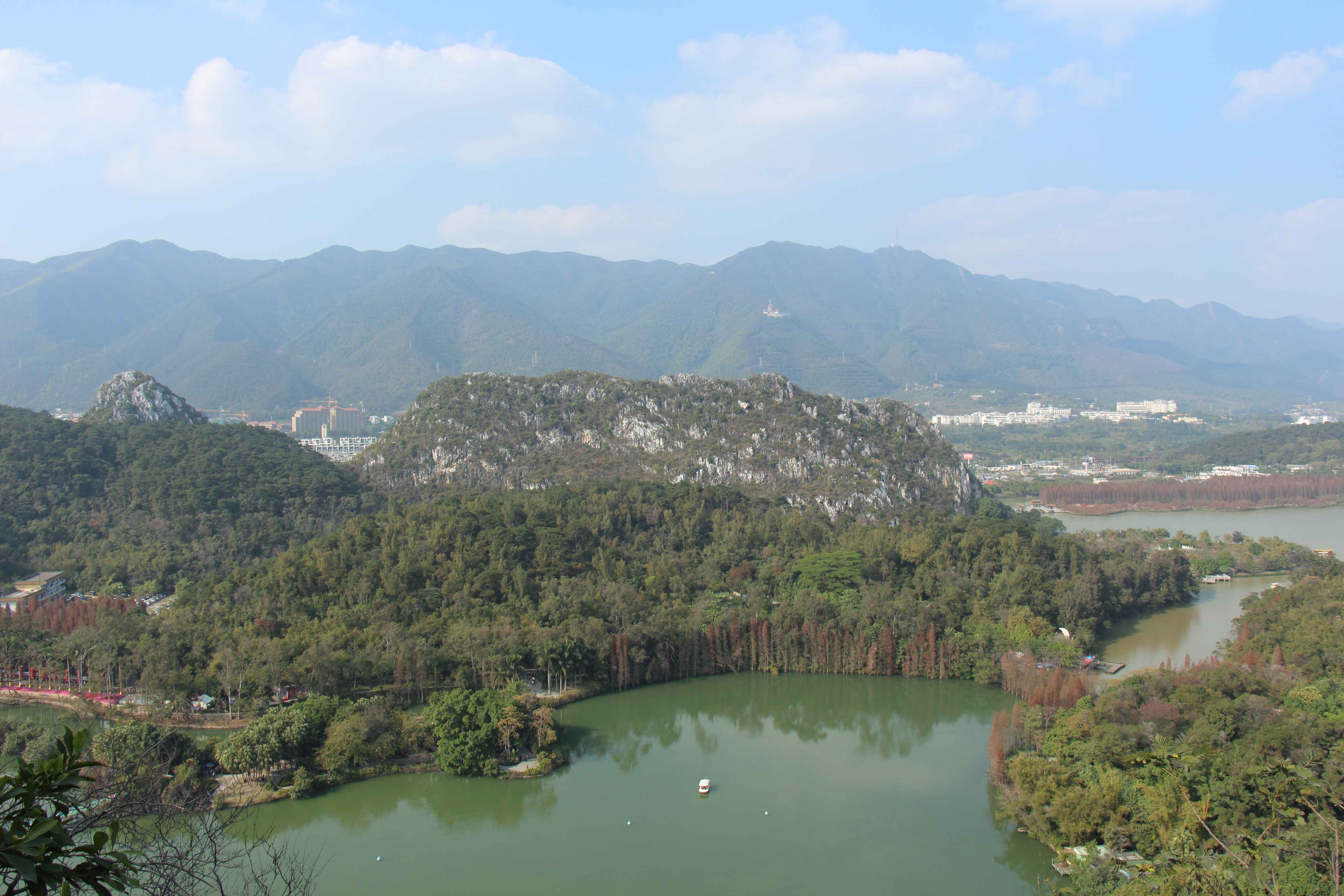
Images taken from Seven Star Crags. From left to right: Seven Star Crags Carvings, View of the city centre from Seven Star Crags, Seven Star Crags Arch, two aerial views of Seven Star Crags.

== Education ==
The city government of Zhaoqing is currently seeking to improve its higher education system and preserve cultural resources. Zhaoqing has a university and is also home to a campus of Guangdong University of Finance. There is also Zhaoqing Foreign Language College, a Canadian-American School and numerous other schools including those specializing in foreign language study.

=== Colleges and universities ===
- Zhaoqing University
- Zhaoqing Foreign Language College
- Guangdong College of Business and Technology
- Zhaoqing Financial University

== Transportation ==
Zhaoqing is served by railways and highways. Direct train and bus services connect it to Guangzhou, Hong Kong and other cities in Guangdong. Major roadways include Interstates 321 and 324 and the Guang-Zhao and Guang-Wu Expressways. The Sanmao Railway also runs through Zhaoqing. It was formerly connected with Hong Kong via the KCRC Guangdong Through Train service from Zhaoqing railway station. Hong Kong owned and based Chu Kong Passenger Transport Co., Ltd also runs daily express catamaran ferries between Zhaoqing and Hong Kong.

Within the city, the primary form of public transportation is the 32 public bus routes and 2 sightseeing routes.

== Sports ==
=== The 15th Games of Guangdong Province ===
Zhaoqing was the hosting city of the 15th Games of Guangdong Province on August 8, 2018.

=== Marathon ===
Zhaoqing has held 3 marathons since 2016. The first two-year consisted only half-marathon. In 2018, the event for the first time consisted both full marathon and half marathon. In 2019, Zhaoqing will hold the 4th Zhaoqing International Marathon estimably in Q2.

=== High diving ===
In 2018, the Zhaoqing Yingxiong High Diving Training Center, which contains the first year-round regulation-size high diving platform, opened at the Zhaoqing Sports Center. This venue would go on to host the FINA High Diving World Cup 2019.
