= Wuling Town =

Historic town in Changde, China

Wuling Town (Chinese: 武陵镇; pinyin: Wǔlíng Zhèn) was a historic town of Dingcheng District (the former Changde County) in Changde Prefecture-level City, Hunan, China. It was established on March 12, 1981, named after Wuling (Chinese: 武陵) of local ancient name; Guojiapu Township (Chinese: 郭家铺乡) was merge to the town. As a township-level division, Wuling Town ceased to be a separate town, It was divided into 3 subdistricts of Guojiapu, Hongyun and Yuxia in 2013.

Wuling Town was located on the southern bank of the Yuan River, It was surrounded by Wuling District across the Yuan river to the west, north and east, Doumuhu Town to the south.

In 2013, the town had an area of 37.67 km^{2} (14.54 sq mi) with a population of 152,000, it was divided into 21 commities and four villages, its seat was Yuxia Community (Chinese: 玉霞社区; the seat of the present of Yuxia Subdistrict).

== Communities and villages ==
Dividing Wuling Town, establishment of 3 subdistricts in 2013
Yuxia Subdistrict		Guojiapu Subdistrict		Hongyun Subdistrict	
English	Chinese	English	Chinese	English	Chinese
Changyuan Community	常沅社区	Guojiapu Community	郭家铺社区 （郭家铺村）	De'an Community	德安社区
Dingcheng Community	鼎城社区	Jinxia Community	金霞社区	Fuguang Community	福广社区 （福广村）
Dukou Community	渡口社区	Kongjiarong Community	孔家榕社区 （孔家榕村）	Hongyun Community	红云社区 （红云村）
Lingjiang Community	临江社区	Sandishui Community	三滴水社区 （三滴水村）	Huachanmiao Community	花船庙社区
Qiaotou Community	桥头社区	Wangjiapu Community	王家铺社区	Shanchi Community	善池社区
Shanjuan Community	善卷社区	Baoguo Village	报国村	Tingchechang Community	停车场社区
Yingbin Community	迎宾社区	Dahechang Village	大禾场村	Xizhan Community	西站社区 （西站村）
Yong'an Community	永安社区	Sanchahu Village	三岔湖村		
Yuxia Community	玉霞社区	Yaoti Village	腰堤村		
