= Zekai =

Zekai is a Turkish masculine given name that may refer to the following notable people:

- Zekai Aksakallı (born 1961), Turkish Special Forces Command commander
- Zekai Apaydın (1884–1947), Turkish civil servant, diplomat and politician
- Zekai Özger (1948–1973), Turkish poet
- Hüseyin Zekai Pasha (1860–1919), Ottoman Turkish painter
- Luo Zekai (1905–1987), Lieutenant General of the Republic of China Army
