= List of lakes of Hunan =

This is a list of lakes in Hunan.

== List ==
Location	English name	Chinese name	Area	Notes
Yueyang	Dongting Lake	洞庭湖	2,628-square-kilometre (1,015 sq mi)	
Nan County	Datong Lake	大通湖	114.2-square-kilometre (44.1 sq mi)	
Linxiang	Huanggai Lake	黄盖湖	86-square-kilometre (33 sq mi)	
Hanshou County	Nan Lake	南湖	82.1-square-kilometre (31.7 sq mi)	
Hanshou County	Weidi Lake	围堤湖	51-square-kilometre (20 sq mi)	
Miluo City	Heye Lake	荷叶湖	41-square-kilometre (16 sq mi)	
Linli County	Maoli Lake	毛里湖	36.8-square-kilometre (14.2 sq mi)	
Linxiang	Ye Lake	冶湖	30-square-kilometre (12 sq mi)	
Yiyang	Lanni Lake	烂泥湖	30-square-kilometre (12 sq mi)	
Anxiang County	Shanhu Lake	珊瑚湖	26-square-kilometre (10 sq mi)	
Changde	Ying Lake	鹰湖	24-square-kilometre (9.3 sq mi)	
Changde	Liuye Lake	柳叶湖	24-square-kilometre (9.3 sq mi)	
Changde	Chongtian Lake	冲天湖	24-square-kilometre (9.3 sq mi)	
Huarong County	East Lake	东湖	23.2-square-kilometre (9.0 sq mi)	
Hanshou County	Taihezhang Lake	太和障湖	23-square-kilometre (8.9 sq mi)	
Yuanjiang	Zhulan Lake	注澜湖	20-square-kilometre (7.7 sq mi)	
Hanshou County	Taibai Lake	太白湖	19-square-kilometre (7.3 sq mi)	
Hanshou County	Maojia Lake	毛家湖	17-square-kilometre (6.6 sq mi)	
Hanshou County	Yangtao Lake	洋淘湖	17-square-kilometre (6.6 sq mi)	
Xiangyin	Helong Lake	鹤龙湖	16-square-kilometre (6.2 sq mi)	
Li County	Beimin Lake	北民湖	14.5-square-kilometre (5.6 sq mi)	
Huarong County	Taxi Lake	塌西湖	14-square-kilometre (5.4 sq mi)	
Huarong County	Niushi Lake	牛氏湖	14-square-kilometre (5.4 sq mi)	
Yueyang	Bajiao Lake	芭蕉湖	12.3-square-kilometre (4.7 sq mi)	
Yueyang	Nan Lake	南湖	12-square-kilometre (4.6 sq mi)	
Linxiang	Baini Lake	白泥湖	11-square-kilometre (4.2 sq mi)	
	Dujia Lake	杜家湖	8.6-square-kilometre (3.3 sq mi)	
	Wangjia Lake	王家湖	7.7-square-kilometre (3.0 sq mi)	
Huarong County	Chiyan Lake	赤眼湖	7.6-square-kilometre (2.9 sq mi)	
	Bajiao Lake	芭蕉湖	7.3-square-kilometre (2.8 sq mi)	
Yueyang	Dajing Lake	大荆湖	7.3-square-kilometre (2.8 sq mi)	
	West Lake	西湖	7.3-square-kilometre (2.8 sq mi)	
Huarong County	Caitian Lake	蔡田湖	7-square-kilometre (2.7 sq mi)	
	Daxingzhang Lake	大兴障湖	6.8-square-kilometre (2.6 sq mi)	
	Egong Lake	鹅公湖	6.5-square-kilometre (2.5 sq mi)	
	Zhangjiazhang Lake	张家障湖	6-square-kilometre (2.3 sq mi)	
Anxiang County	Darong Lake	大溶湖	5.8-square-kilometre (2.2 sq mi)	
Nan County	Tuantou Lake	团头湖	5.7-square-kilometre (2.2 sq mi)	
Yueyang	Songyang Lake	松杨湖	5.6-square-kilometre (2.2 sq mi)	
	Dalian Lake	大莲湖	5.6-square-kilometre (2.2 sq mi)	
Changde	Baizhi Lake	白芷湖	5.5-square-kilometre (2.1 sq mi)	
	Yaojia Lake	姚家湖	5.4-square-kilometre (2.1 sq mi)	
	Honglingwan Lake	红菱垸湖	5.4-square-kilometre (2.1 sq mi)	
