= Guojiapu =

Subdistrict of Changde, China

Coordinates: 29°1′7″N 111°40′47″E

Guojiapu (Chinese: 郭家铺街道; pinyin: Guōjiāpù Jiēdào) is a subdistrict of Dingcheng District in Changde Prefecture-level City, Hunan, China. Dividing a part of the former Wuling Town (Chinese: 武陵镇), the subdistrict was formed in 2013. It has an area of 21.72 km^{2} (8.39 sq mi) with a population of 28,900 (as of 2013).
