= Anfu Town =

Historic town in Hunan, China

Anfu Town (Chinese: 安福镇; pinyin: Ānfú Zhèn) was a historic town and the former county seat of Linli in Hunan, China. It was originally the Chengguan Town (Chinese: 城关镇) established in 1951, Chengguan Town was renamed to Anfu Town in 2004, and the town was reformed on November 23, 2015. The town had an area of 135.59 km^{2} (52.35 sq mi) with a population of 140,300 (as of 2015). Through the merging villages and communities in 2016, the town had 4 villages and 26 communities under its jurisdiction, its seat is Anfulu Community (Chinese: 安福路社区). It ceased to be a separate town and was divided into Anfu Subdistrict and Wangchenh Subdistrict in 2017.

== Subdivisions (2016 - 2017) ==
When the town was reformed in 2015, the town had 33 villages and 11 communities. Through the amalgamation of the village-level divisions in 2016, the town were divided into 20 villages and 11 communities soon afterwards its divisions were adjusted to 4 villages and 26 communities.

Administrative Divisions of Anfu Town (4 villages and 26 communities)
villages or communities		communities	
English	Chinese	English	Chinese
Guihua Village	桂花村	Nongfeng Community	农丰社区
Kanhua Village	看花村	Qingshui Community	清水社区
Lin'an Village	临安村	Renminjie Community	人民街社区
Yong'an Village	永安村	Sijihong Community	四季红社区
Anfulu Community	安福路社区	Taiping Community	太平社区
Bajiao Community	芭蕉社区	Taishan Community	太山社区
Chaoyangjie Community	朝阳街社区	Tieluoyan Community	铁锣堰社区
Chucheng Community	楚城社区	Wenhuajie Community	文化街社区
Datang Community	大塘社区	Wentang Community	文塘社区
Hejie Community	河街社区	Xiaojiahe Community	肖家河社区
Heping Community	和平社区	Yanggang Community	杨岗社区
Hucheng Community	护城社区	Yejiamiao Community	叶家庙社区
Jinbaolu Community	金宝路社区	Yingbinlu Community	迎宾路社区
Jiuzi Community	九姊社区	Yueliangdao Community	月亮岛社区
Meixiqiao Community	梅溪桥社区	Zongmiao Community	总庙社区

== Subdivisions in 2015 ==
33 Villages and 11 communities of the new Anfu Town reformed in November 2015
Merging Wangcheng Township (Chinese: 望城乡) with 13 villages, the former Anfu Town with 8 villages and 11 communities, 3 villages of Chen'er Township (Chinese: 陈二乡), 4 villages of Yangban Township (Chinese: 杨板乡), 2 villages of Yushiqiao Town (Chinese: 佘市桥镇) and 3 villages of Xiumei Town (Chinese: 修梅镇), the new Anfu Town reformed in 2015 had 33 villages and 11 communities under its jurisdiction.
villages or communities		the former towns or townships	
English	Chinese	English	Chinese
Chucheng Village	楚城村	Wangcheng Township	望城乡
Daxing Village	大兴村	Wangcheng Township	望城乡
Guihua Village	桂花村	Wangcheng Township	望城乡
Kanhua Village	看花村	Wangcheng Township	望城乡
Lin'an Village	临安村	Wangcheng Township	望城乡
Mingluo Village	鸣锣村	Wangcheng Township	望城乡
Shibai Village	石柏村	Wangcheng Township	望城乡
Songyu Village	宋玉村	Wangcheng Township	望城乡
Tonghuan Village	同欢村	Wangcheng Township	望城乡
Xujiaping Village	徐家坪村	Wangcheng Township	望城乡
Yanggang Village	杨岗村	Wangcheng Township	望城乡
Yong'an Village	永安村	Wangcheng Township	望城乡
Yufeng Village	余丰村	Wangcheng Township	望城乡
Anfulu Community	安福路社区	the former Anfu Town	安福镇
Bajiao Community	芭蕉社区	the former Anfu Town	安福镇
Chaoyangjie Community	朝阳街社区	the former Anfu Town	安福镇
Hejie Community	河街社区	the former Anfu Town	安福镇
Hucheng Community	护城社区	the former Anfu Town	安福镇
Renminjie Community	人民街社区	the former Anfu Town	安福镇
Siji Community	四季红社区	the former Anfu Town	安福镇
Taiping Community	太平社区	the former Anfu Town	安福镇
Wenhuajie Community	文化街社区	the former Anfu Town	安福镇
Wentang Community	文塘社区	the former Anfu Town	安福镇
Yingbinlu Community	迎宾路社区	the former Anfu Town	安福镇
Hanxi Village	寒溪村	the former Anfu Town	安福镇
Jiuzi Village	九姊村	the former Anfu Town	安福镇
Meixi Village	梅溪村	the former Anfu Town	安福镇
Nongfeng Village	农丰村	the former Anfu Town	安福镇
Qingshui Village	清水村	the former Anfu Town	安福镇
Tieluoyan Village	铁锣堰村	the former Anfu Town	安福镇
Wangcheng Village	望城村	the former Anfu Town	安福镇
Zongmiao Village	总庙村	the former Anfu Town	安福镇
Dajiang Village	大江村	Chen'er Township	陈二乡
Datang Village	大塘村	Chen'er Township	陈二乡
Liangcha Village	两汊村	Chen'er Township	陈二乡
Gongjiagang Village	龚家岗村	Yangban Township	杨板乡
Loufangpo Village	楼房坡村	Yangban Township	杨板乡
Shuangshi Village	双狮村	Yangban Township	杨板乡
Wanfu Village	万福村	Yangban Township	杨板乡
Jiangjiaping Village	蒋家坪村	Yushiqiao Town	佘市桥镇
Ma'an Village	马鞍村	Yushiqiao Town	佘市桥镇
Baitu Village	白土村	Xiumei Town	修梅镇
Meifeng Village	美丰村	Xiumei Town	修梅镇
Yemiao Village	叶庙村	Xiumei Town	修梅镇
