= Anfeng =

Anfeng may refer to:

Towns

- Anfeng, Dongtai (安丰镇), a town in Dongtai, Jiangsu Province
- Anfeng, Shou County (安丰镇), a town in Shou County, Anhui Province

Townships

- Anfeng, Anxiang (安丰乡), a town in Anxiang County, Hunan Province
