= Nanpinggang =

Subdistrict of Changde, China

Coordinates: 29°4′1″N 111°41′9″E

Nanpinggang (Chinese: 南坪岗街道; pinyin: Nánpínggǎng Jiēdào) is a subdistrict and the seat of Wuling District in Changde Prefecture-level City, Hunan, China. On August 18, 2014, the former Nanpinggang Township was reorganized as a subdistrict. It has an area of 11.8 km^{2} (4.6 sq mi) with a population of about 16,000 (as of 2014). It has 4 communities and 3 villages under its jurisdiction, its seat is Wangyue Community (Chinese: 望月社区).

== See also ==
- List of township-level divisions of Hunan
