= Yuxia Subdistrict =

Subdistrict of Changde, China

Yuxia Subdistrict (Chinese: 玉霞街道; pinyin: Yùxiá Jiēdào) is a subdistrict of Dingcheng District in Changde Prefecture-level City, Hunan, China. Dividing a portion of the former Wuling Town (Chinese: 武陵镇), the subdistrict was formed in 2013. It has an area of 4.69 km^{2} (1.81 sq mi) with a population of 76,200 (as of 2013).
