= Wangcheng Subdistrict, Linli County =

Subdistrict in Hunan Province, China

Wangcheng Subdistrict 望城街道
- Subdistrict
- Location in Hunan
- Coordinates: 29°25′52″N 111°38′52″E
- Country: People's Republic of China
- Province: Hunan
- Prefecture-level city: Changde
- County: Linli County
- Time zone: UTC+8 (China Standard)

Wangcheng Subdistrict (Chinese: 望城街道; pinyin: Wàngchéng Jiēdào) is a subdistrict of Linli County in Hunan, China. The subdistrict was incorporated from a part of the former Anfu Town in 2017. It has an area of 61.80 km^{2} (23.86 sq mi) with a population of 52,200 (as of 2017). The subdistrict has 4 villages and 6 communities under its jurisdiction, and its seat is Yingbinlu Community (Chinese: 迎宾路社区).

== Subdivisions ==
4 villages and 6 communities of Wangcheng Subdistrict (2017–present)
| villages and communities | | villages and communities | |
| English | Chinese | English | Chinese |
| Guihua Village | 桂花村 | Datang Community | 大塘社区 |
| Kanhua Village | 看花村 | Heping Community | 和平社区 |
| Lin'an Village | 临安村 | Wentang Community | 文塘社区 |
| Yong'an Village | 永安村 | Yanggang Community | 杨岗社区 |
| Chucheng Community | 楚城社区 | Yueliangdao Community | 月亮岛社区 |
