= Huang Xiaowei =

Huang Xiaowei may refer to:

- Huang Xiaowei (politician)
- Huang Xiaowei (engineer)
- Huang Xiaowei (computer scientist)
