= Hongyun Subdistrict =

Subdistrict of Changde, China

Hongyun Subdistrict (Chinese: 红云街道; pinyin: Hóngyún Jiēdào) is a subdistrict and the seat of Dingcheng District in Changde Prefecture-level City, Hunan, China. Dividing a part of the former Wuling Town (Chinese: 武陵镇), the subdistrict was formed in 2013. It has an area of 11.26 km^{2} (4.35 sq mi) with a population of 34,900 (as of 2013).

== See also ==
- List of township-level divisions of Hunan
