= Anfu Subdistrict =

Subdistrict of Changde, China

Anfu Subdistrict (Chinese: 安福街道; pinyin: Ānfú Jiēdào) is a subdistrict and the county seat of Linli County in Changde, Hunan, China. The subdistrict was incorporated from a part of the former Anfu Town in 2017. It has an area of 73.79 km^{2} (28.49 sq mi) with a population of 52,600 (as of 2017). The subdistrict has 20 communities under its jurisdiction, and its seat is Anfulu Community (Chinese: 安福路社区).

== Subdivisions ==
20 communities of Anfu Subdistrict (2017 - present)
communities		communities	
English	Chinese	English	Chinese
Anfulu Community	安福路社区	Renminjie Community	人民街社区
Bajiao Community	芭蕉社区	Sijihong Community	四季红社区
Chaoyangjie Community	朝阳街社区	Taiping Community	太平社区
Hejie Community	河街社区	Taishan Community	太山社区
Hucheng Community	护城社区	Tieluoyan Community	铁锣堰社区
Jinbaolu Community	金宝路社区	Wenhuajie Community	文化街社区
Jiuzi Community	九姊社区	Xiaojiahe Community	肖家河社区
Meixiqiao Community	梅溪桥社区	Yejiamiao Community	叶家庙社区
Nongfeng Community	农丰社区	Yingbinlu Community	迎宾路社区
Qingshui Community	清水社区	Zongmiao Community	总庙社区
