= Jinshi City =

Jinshi City 津市市 Tsingshih
- County-level city
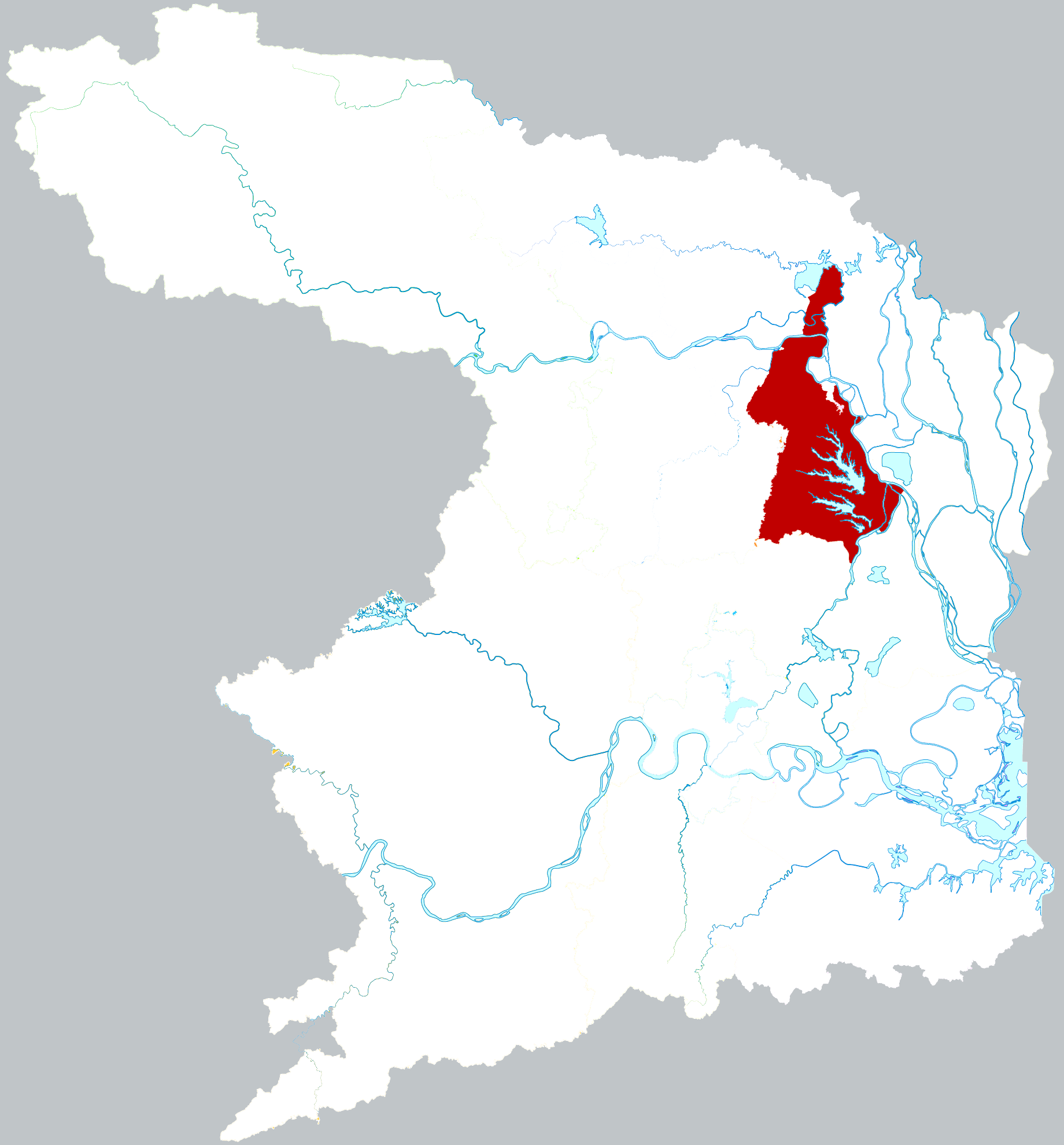
- Location of Jinshi City within Changde

- Location in Hunan
- Coordinates: 29°30′00″N 111°54′29″E
- Country: People's Republic of China
- Province: Hunan
- Prefecture-level city: Changde

Area
  - County-level city: 556.2 km^{2} (214.8 sq mi)
  - Urban: 71.19 km^{2} (27.49 sq mi)

Population (2017)
  - County-level city: 244,000
  - Density: 439/km^{2} (1,140/sq mi)
  - Urban: 109,900
- Time zone: UTC+8 (China Standard)
- Website: jinshishi.gov.cn

Jinshi City (Chinese: 津市市; pinyin: Jīnshì Shì) is a county-level city in Hunan Province, China, under the administration of the prefecture-level city of Changde. Jinshi is located on the north in Hunan Province and the central north in Changde, it borders to the northeast and the northwest by Li County, to the west by Linli County, to the south by Dingcheng District, and to the east by Anxiang County. The city has an area of 556.16 kilometres (345.58 mi) with a registered population of 239,744 (as of 2016). It is divided into four towns and five subdistricts under its jurisdiction. The government seat is Xiangyangjie (襄阳街街道). Jinshi was honored as the National Sanitary City.

== Administrative divisions ==
According to the result on adjustment of township-level administrative divisions of Jinshi City on November 23, 2015 Jinshi City has four towns and five subdistricts under its jurisdiction. They are:

4 towns

- Xinzhou (新洲镇)
- Maolihu (毛里湖镇)
- Yaoshan (药山镇)
- Baiyi (白衣镇)

5 Subdistricts

- Sanzhouyi (三洲驿街道)
- Wangjiaqiao (汪家桥街道)
- Xiangyangjie (襄阳街街道)
- Jinyuling (金鱼岭街道)
- Jiashan (嘉山街道)
