= Shenliu =

Town in Anxiang, Hunan, China

Coordinates: 29°24′25.6″N 112°11′45.2″E

Shenliu Town (Chinese: 深柳镇; pinyin: Shēnliǔ Zhèn) is a town and the county seat of Anxiang in Hunan, China. The town was reformed through the amalgamation of Chengguan Town (Chinese: 城关镇) and Anyou Township (Chinese: 安猷乡) in September 2008. It took its name after the famous Shenliu Academy (Chinese: 深柳书院) built in Qing dynasty and located in the north of the town. The town has an area of 68.32 km^{2} (26.38 sq mi) with a population of 125,192 (as of 2016). It has 9 communities and 13 villages under its jurisdiction.

== See also ==
- List of township-level divisions of Hunan
