= Hayati Çitaklar =

Turkish playwright and director

- Born: 18 September 1986 (age 39); Tekirdağ, Turkey
- Occupations: Novelist, Playwright, Poet, Actor, Editor
- Writing career
- Period: 2000–present
- Notable works: Nazım (Nazım Hikmet Musical; debut); In Playful Land (2010 children musical play); Red Rapunzel (2010 children play); Mechanic Puppets Land (2011 children play); Alyosa/ Story of Aliye Berger (2011 play); In Search of Lost Troia; A Matryoshka Story (play); Transformation (play); Paradox (performance text); Earthquake (tragedy); Fame (play); Chrysanthemum (poem)
- Literary movement: Postmodern literature

Hayati Çitaklar (born 18 September 1986) is a Turkish playwright, director, novelist, actor and poet. He is also the editor of some literature magazines.

== Background ==
Hayati Çitaklar was born in Tekirdağ in 1986. He is of partial Albanian descent. He got training in acting at Nâzım Hikmet Foundation and creative writing at Uğur Mumcu Investigative Journalism Foundation. He went on to study philosophy at the Bilkent University then he changed the university and graduated from the College of Social Sciences and Humanities with three different major Continental Philosophy, Comparative Literature and Gender Studies at the Koç University in 2011 with honour. 2008 to 2011, he is the special student of Istanbul University State Conservatory Theatre Department. From 2000, he publishes poems, short stories, articles and book and film reviews in literature journals, magazines and newspapers. In 2010, he left acting and directing to become a full-time writer. In 2010, he worked with famous Turkish actress and theatre professor Yıldız Kenter and began his career as a playwright. His play Alyosa/ Story of Aliye Berger was published by Imge Publishing. His plays and performance texts were performed by different theatres in Turkey.

== Awards ==
- 2008 S. Avni Ölmez Poetry Competition Committee: Special Award
- 2008 Eskisehir Culture, Art and Literature Association: Short Story Award
- 2008 Kocaeli University 12th Youth Poetry Competition: Poetry Award
- 2008 Yahya Kemal Beyatlı Poetry Competition Young Poet Award
- 2009 Salom Newspaper Gila Kohen Story Award
- 2009 Nail Cakirhan Poetry Competition Poetry Award
- 2010 Arkadaş Z. Ozger Poetry Competition
- 2010 Eskisehir Film Festival Cinema Article about Eisenstein's "The Battleship Potemkin"

=== Filmography ===
- Mahpeyker (2010)
- Sarah (2010)
- Ezber (2009)
- The Power of Love (2009)
- Olu Yaprak Vurusu (2009)
- Bez Bebek (2008)
- Ginger (2006)
- Bay Onemsizin Muhim Isleri (2005)
- Mountain (2005)
- What I Can Get Away With (2004)
