= Doumuhu =

Subdistrict of Changde, China

Coordinates: 28°57′2″N 111°37′40″E

Doumuhu (Chinese: 斗姆湖街道; pinyin: Dǒumǔhú Jiēdào) is a subdistrict of Dingcheng District in Changde Prefecture-level City, Hunan, China. The subdistrict was reformed through reorganization of the former Doumuhu Town in 2013. It has an area of 41.6 km^{2} (16.1 sq mi) with a population of 41,300 (as of 2013).
