= Xiangyangjie =

Subdistrict of Jinshi City, Hunan, China

Coordinates: 33°46′N 108°47′E

Xiangyangjie Subdistrict (Chinese: 襄阳街街道; pinyin: Xiāngyángjiē Jiēdào) is a subdistrict and the seat of Jinshi City in Hunan, China. The subdistrict was formed in 1966. In December 2002, Yangyou Township (Chinese: 阳由乡) was merged to it. It has an area of 11.5 km^{2} (4.4 sq mi) with a population of about 20,440 (as of 2016). It has 7 communities under its jurisdiction.
