= Changde Vocational and Technical College =

College in Changde, China

Coordinates: 29.0381°N 111.6399°E

Changde Vocational and Technical College (college code 13039; simplified Chinese: 常德职业技术学院; traditional Chinese: 常德職業技術學院; pinyin: Chángdé Zhíyè Jìshù Xuéyuàn) is a post-secondary institution in Changde, Hunan in China. In 2003 the Changde Agricultural School, the Changde Hygiene School and the Changde Mechatronic Engineering School merged to form the Changde Vocational and Technical College.
