= Huang Xiaowei (engineer) =

Chinese engineer

- 黄小卫
- Born: 29 January 1962 (age 64); Linli County, Hunan, China
- Education: Central South University; Northeastern University
- Scientific career
- Fields: Nonferrous metallurgy
- Workplaces: General Research Institute for Nonferrous Metals; National Engineering Research Center for Rare Earth Materials

Chinese name
- Simplified Chinese: 黄小卫
- Traditional Chinese: 黃小衛
Transcriptions
Standard Mandarin
- Hanyu Pinyin: Huáng Xiǎowèi

Huang Xiaowei (born 29 January 1962) is a Chinese engineer who is a researcher at the General Research Institute for Nonferrous Metals and director of National Engineering Research Center for Rare Earth Materials, and an academician of the Chinese Academy of Engineering.

== Biography ==
Huang was born in Linli County, Hunan, on 29 January 1962. After resuming the college entrance examination, in 1979, she enrolled at Central-South Institute of Mining and Metallurgy (now Central South University), majoring in nonferrous metallurgy. She earned her doctor's degree in metallurgical engineering from Northeastern University in 2008.

After graduating in 1983, she was dispatched to the Rare Earth Institute of Beijing Nonferrous Metals Research Institute, where she was engineer from 1983 to 1993 and to senior engineer from 1993 to 1998. She joined the Chinese Communist Party in June 1996. She is now a researcher at the General Research Institute for Nonferrous Metals and director of National Engineering Research Center for Rare Earth Materials.

== Honors and awards ==
- 27 November 2017 Member of the Chinese Academy of Engineering (CAE)
