= Dingcheng, Changde =

Dingcheng 鼎城区
- District
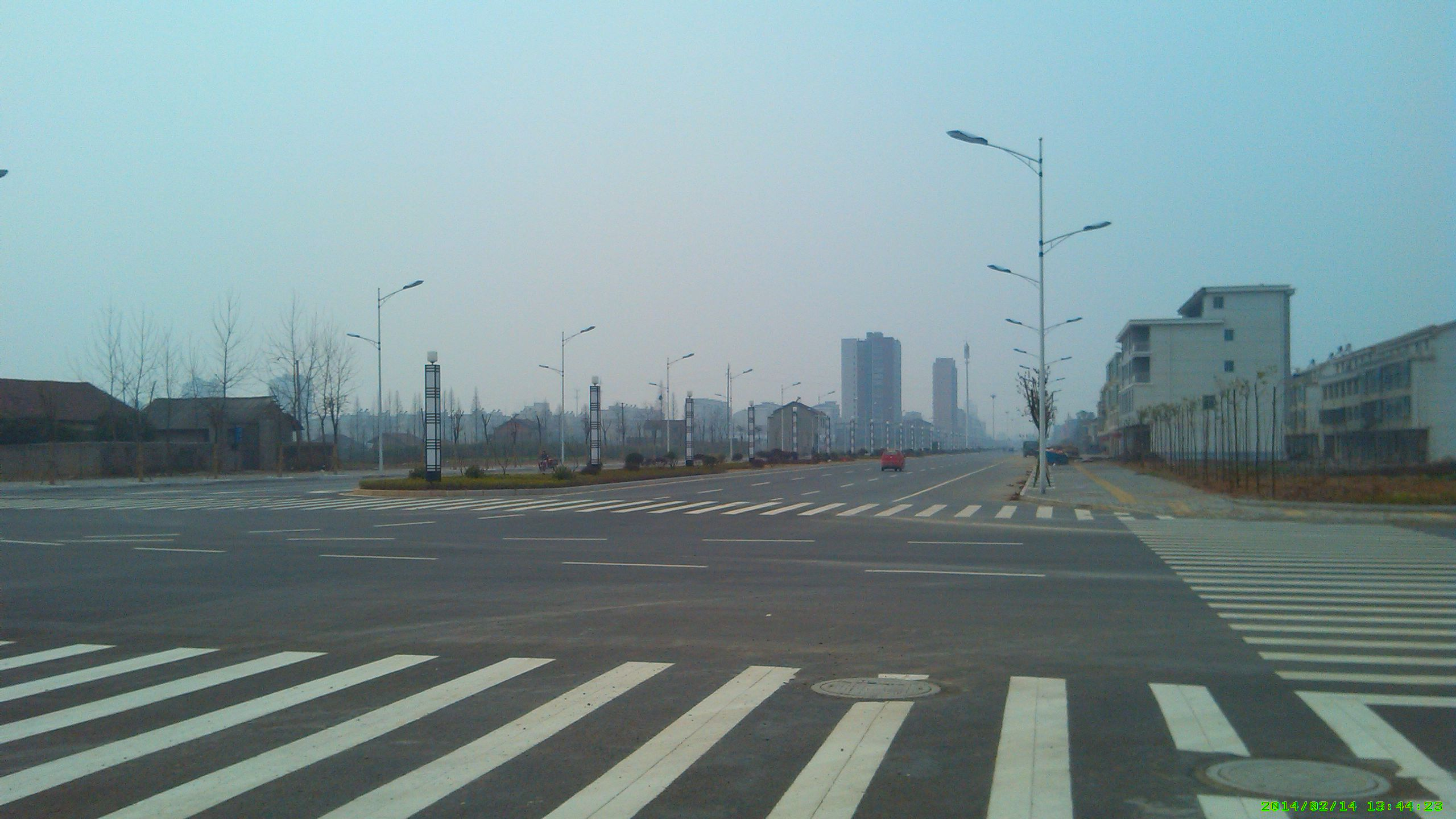

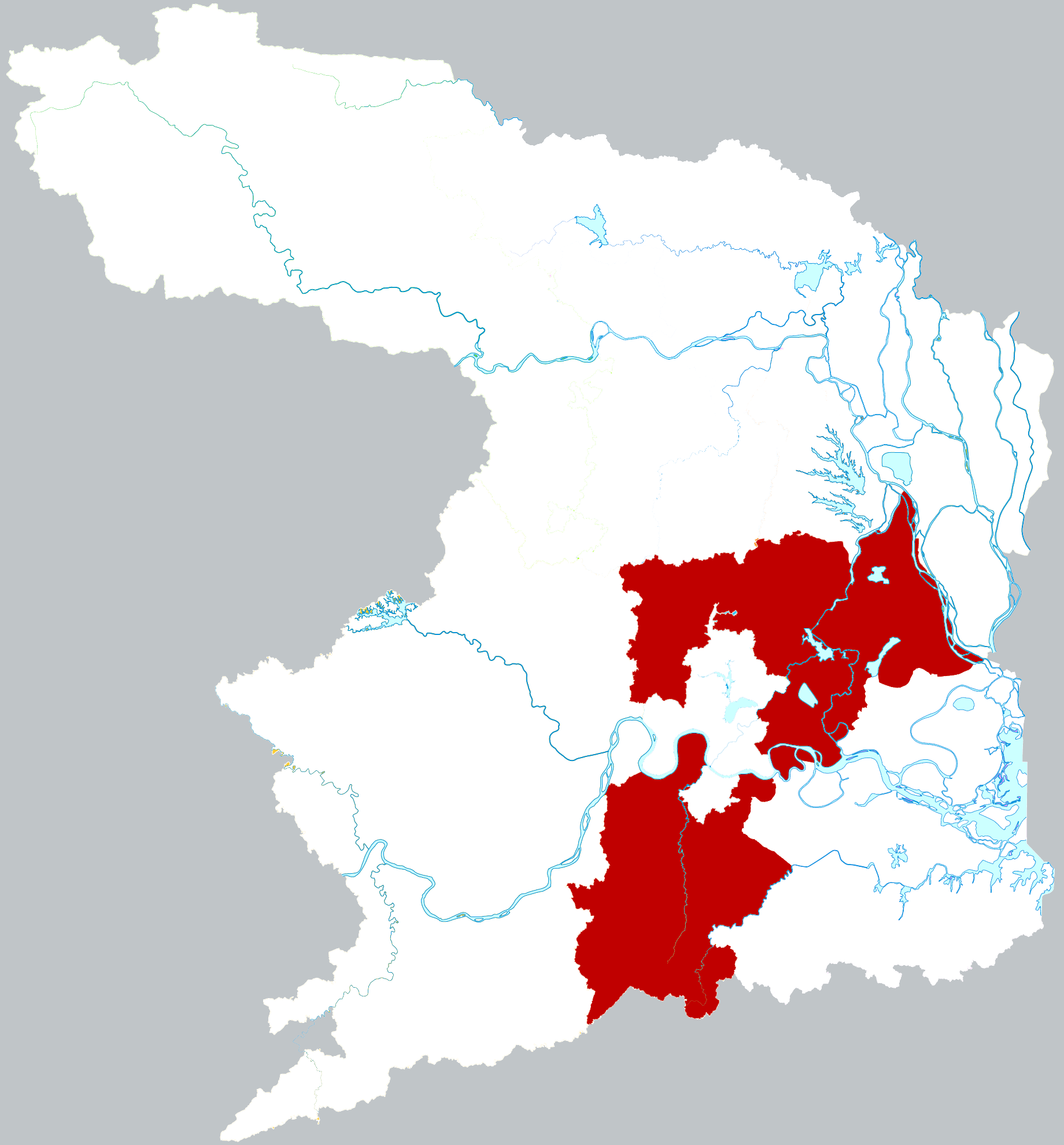
- Location of Dingcheng District within Changde

- Location in Hunan
- Coordinates: 29°00′13″N 111°41′34″E
- Country: China
- Province: Hunan
- Prefecture-level city: Changde
- District seat: Hongyun Subdistrict

Area
  - Total: 2,339.6 km^{2} (903.3 sq mi)

Population (2020 census)
  - Total: 738,085
  - Density: 315.47/km^{2} (817.08/sq mi)
- Time zone: UTC+8 (China Standard)
- Website: www.dingcheng.gov.cn

Dingcheng District (simplified Chinese: 鼎城区; traditional Chinese: 鼎城區; pinyin: Dǐngchéng Qū) is one of two urban districts in Changde City, Hunan Province, China; it is also the 2nd most populous district (after Heshan District) in Hunan. The district is bordered to the north by Anxiang County, Jinshi City and Linli County, to the west by Taoyuan County, to the north by Anhua and Taojiang Counties, and to the east by Hanshou County. Wuling District is in the central west of Dingcheng District. Dingcheng is the largest district by population or by area in Hunan, covering an area of 2,322.5 kilometres (1,443.1 mi) with a registered population of 764,700 (as of 2015). It is divided into four subdistricts, 19 towns and one township, and its government seat is Hongyun Subdistrict (红云街道).

== Administrative divisions ==
Dingcheng has 5 subdistricts, 17 towns and 1 township under its jurisdiction.

5 subdistricts

- Yuxia Subdistrict (玉霞街道)
- Hongyun Subdistrict (红云街道)
- Guojiapu Subdistrict (郭家铺街道)
- Doumuhu Subdistrict (斗姆湖街道)
- Guanxi Subdistrict (灌溪街道)

17 towns

- Haozigang (蒿子港镇)
- Zhonghekou (中河口镇)
- Shimeitang (十美堂镇)
- Niubitan (牛鼻滩镇)
- Hangongdu (韩公渡镇)
- Shigongqiao (石公桥镇)
- Zhendeqiao (镇德桥镇)
- Zhoujiadian (周家店镇)
- Shuangqiaoping (双桥坪镇)
- Caijiagang (蔡家岗镇)
- Caoping (草坪镇)
- Shimenqiao (石门桥镇)
- Xiejiapu (谢家铺镇)
- Huangtudian (黄土店镇)
- Yaotianping (尧天坪镇)
- Shibantan (石板滩镇)
- Huayanxi (花岩溪镇)

1 township

- Xujiaqiao Hui and Uyghur Ethnic Township (许家桥回族维吾尔族乡)
