= The Peach Blossom Spring =

Old Chinese fable

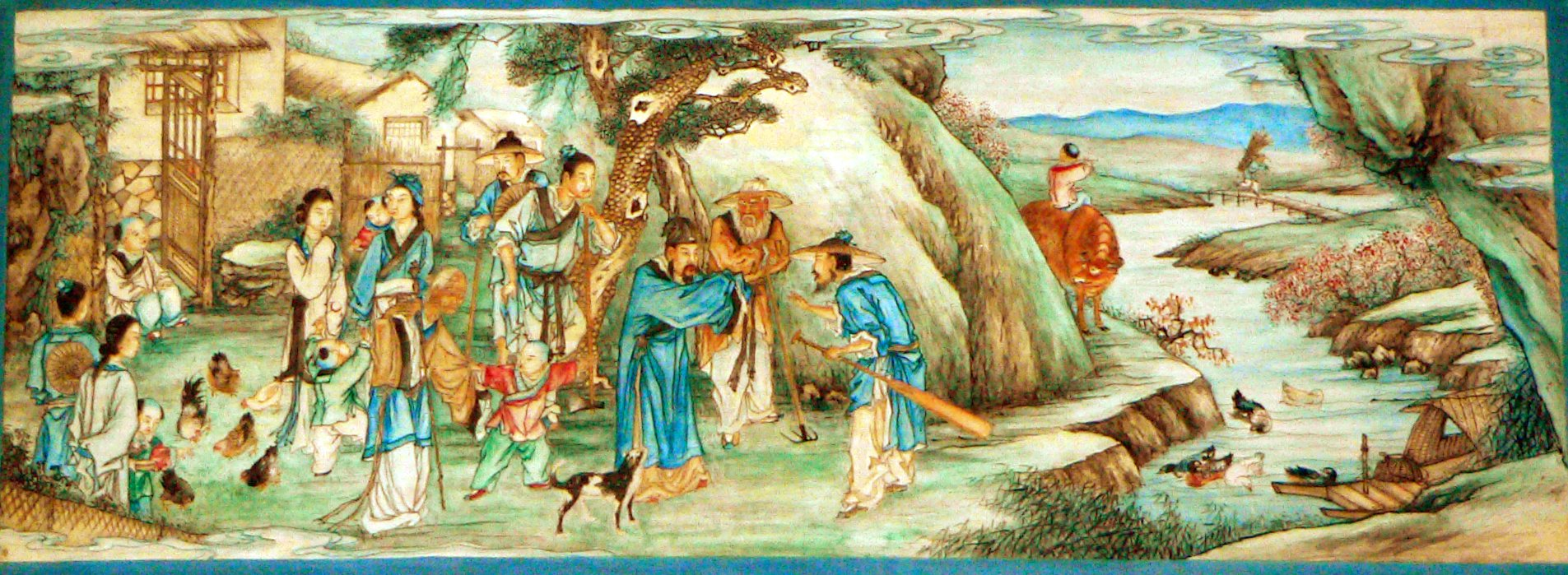
Depiction of the tale on a painting from the Long Corridor, Summer Palace, Beijing

The Peach Blossom Spring (Chinese: 桃花源記; pinyin: Táohuā Yuán Jì; lit. 'Source of the Peach Blossoms', also translated as “(The Record of) the Peach Blossom”), or Peach Blossom Spring Story or The Peach Blossom Land was a fable written by Tao Yuanming in 421 CE about a chance discovery of an ethereal utopia where the people lead an ideal existence in harmony with nature, unaware of the outside world for centuries. The phrase can be used to describe an idealistic place of beauty and repose, although it is sometimes used to refer to an unrealistic dream.

== Plot ==
A painting of the subject "The Peach Blossom Spring" by Qiu Ying (1494–1552)

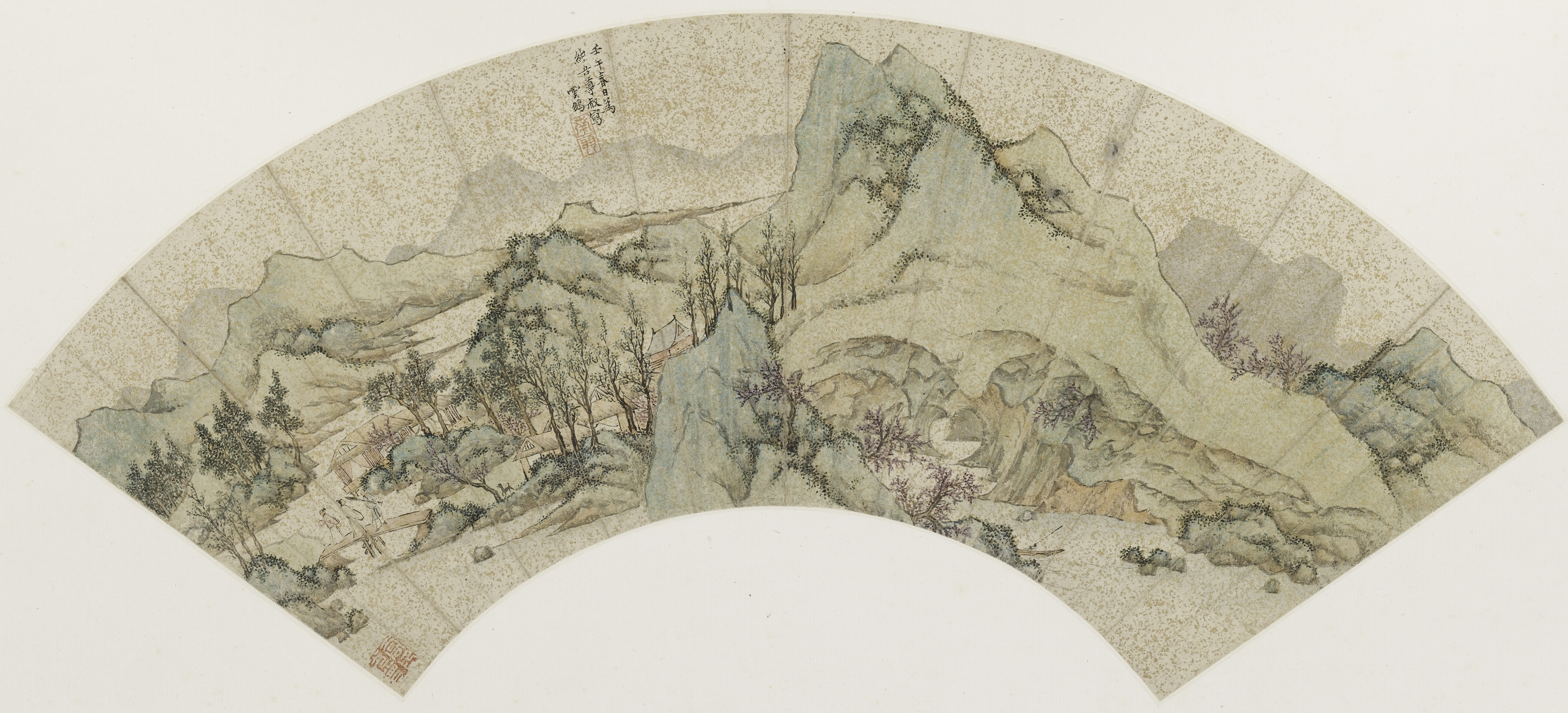
The Peach-Blossom Spring, painted by Ding Yunpeng, 1582

"The Peach Blossom Spring" was written during a time of political instability and national disunity; and, according to the story, set in the same (the Taiyuan era of the Jin dynasty). "Peach Blossom Spring" describes how a fisherman from Wuling haphazardly sailed into a river in a forest made up entirely of blossoming peach trees, where even the ground was covered by peach petals. When he reached the end of the river (or spring in some translations), the source turned out to be a Dongtian Grotto. Though narrow at first, he was able to squeeze through and the passage eventually reached a village with animals and people of all ages.

The villagers were surprised to see him, but were kind and friendly. They explained that their ancestors escaped to this place during the civil unrest of the Qin dynasty, and that they themselves had not left since or had contact with anyone from the outside. As a result, they had heard nothing of subsequent changes in political regimes, but remained happy and self-sufficient. The fisherman was warmly received by the hospitable villagers and stayed for over a week. Upon leaving, he was informed that it was worthless to reveal this experience to the world. However, he marked his route on his way out with signs and later divulged the existence of this idyllic haven to others, who attempted repeatedly – but in vain – to locate it.

== Influences ==
The Tang dynasty poet Li Bai referenced the Peach Blossom Spring in his poem "A Gift to Wang Lun" (贈汪倫, Zèng Wāng Lún, c. 750 CE).

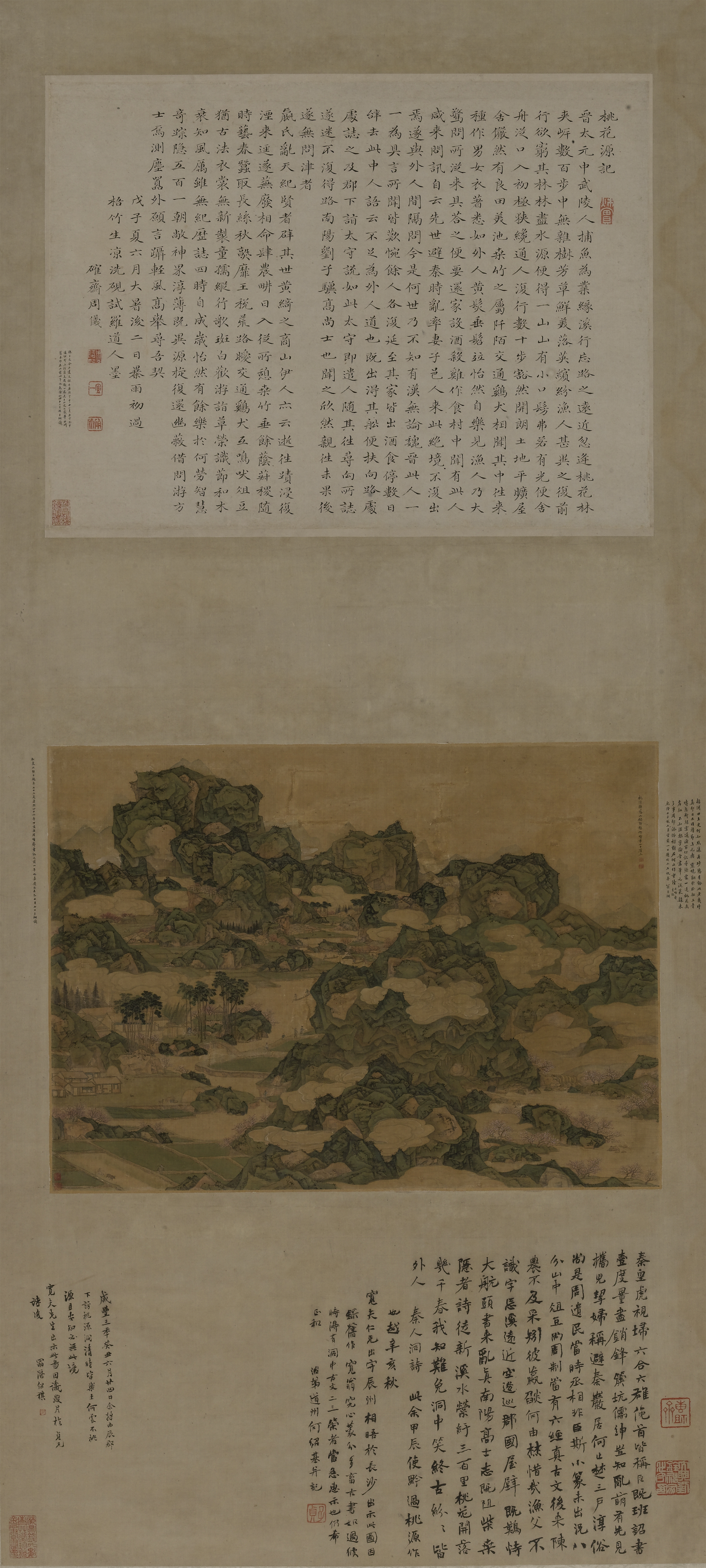
The Peach-Blossom Spring, painted by Gu Fuzhen, 1706

The expression shìwaì taóyuán (世外桃源), lit. "the Peach Spring beyond this world") has become a popular four-character idiom (chengyu), meaning an unexpectedly fantastic place off the beaten path, usually an unspoiled wilderness of great beauty.

The text inspired many later poems, some music compositions, art and a modern Taiwanese play-turned-movie, Secret Love for the Peach Blossom Spring. In some of the poems, the inhabitants of the villages were xian (immortals).

Taohuayuan Scenic Area is a national park based on The Peach Blossom Spring located in Taoyuan County, Hunan, China.

== Translations ==
- Peach Blossom Shangri-la: Tao Hua Yuan Ji. Translated by Rick Davis and David Steelman.
- "Peach Blossom Spring" (PDF). Translated by Cyril Birch. Asia For Educators, Columbia University.

== See also ==
- Grotto-heavens, idealized Daoist retreats
- Immortal Peaches, another Chinese myth element
