= Luo Zekai =

Chinese republican general (1905–1987)

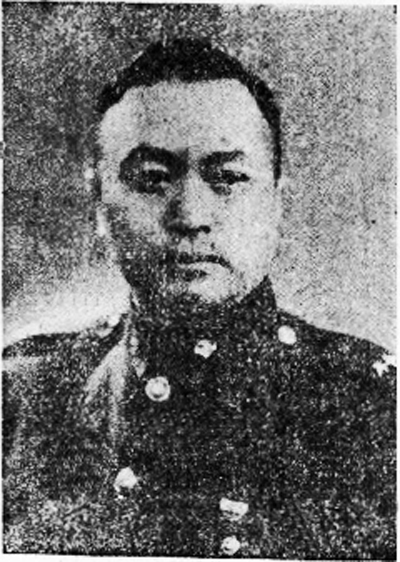
- Born: 1905 Changde, Hunan, China
- Died: 1987 (aged 81–82) Taiwan
- Allegiance: Republic of China
- Branch: (Republic of China (1912–1949)) National Revolutionary Army
- Rank: Lieutenant general
- Battles / wars: Second Sino-Japanese War; Chinese Civil War; Battle of Shanghai

Luo Zekai (traditional Chinese: 羅澤闓; simplified Chinese: 罗泽闿; Wade–Giles: Lo Tse-kai; 1905–1987) was a Chinese National Revolutionary Army lieutenant general during the Second Sino-Japanese War and the Chinese Civil War.

== Biography ==
In his early years, he graduated from the sixth phase of the Whampoa Military Academy and the eleventh phase of the Army University. In 1938, he served as the director of the Fourth Division of the First Office of the Military Command. He later served as the division commander of the 191st Division of the 42nd Army of the National Revolutionary Army and the chief of staff of the 34th Army Group. In 1944, he served as lieutenant-general chief of staff of Hu Zongnan, deputy commander of the Eighth Theater Command, and at the end of the year served as the commander of the 202nd Division of the Youth Army.

In 1947, he served as director of the Third Department of the Ministry of National Defense and a member of the Central Committee of the Kuomintang. In 1948, he served as deputy director of the Xi'an Office of Appeasement. In 1949, he served as the commander of the 37th Army of the National Revolutionary Army and was ordered to defend the Pudong area of Shanghai. In the same year in the Battle of Shanghai, Tang Enbo led his troops to retreat without notice, and Luo Zekai's troops were destroyed by the People's Liberation Army. He later fled to Taiwan alone.
