= Wuling, Changde =

Wuling 武陵区
- District
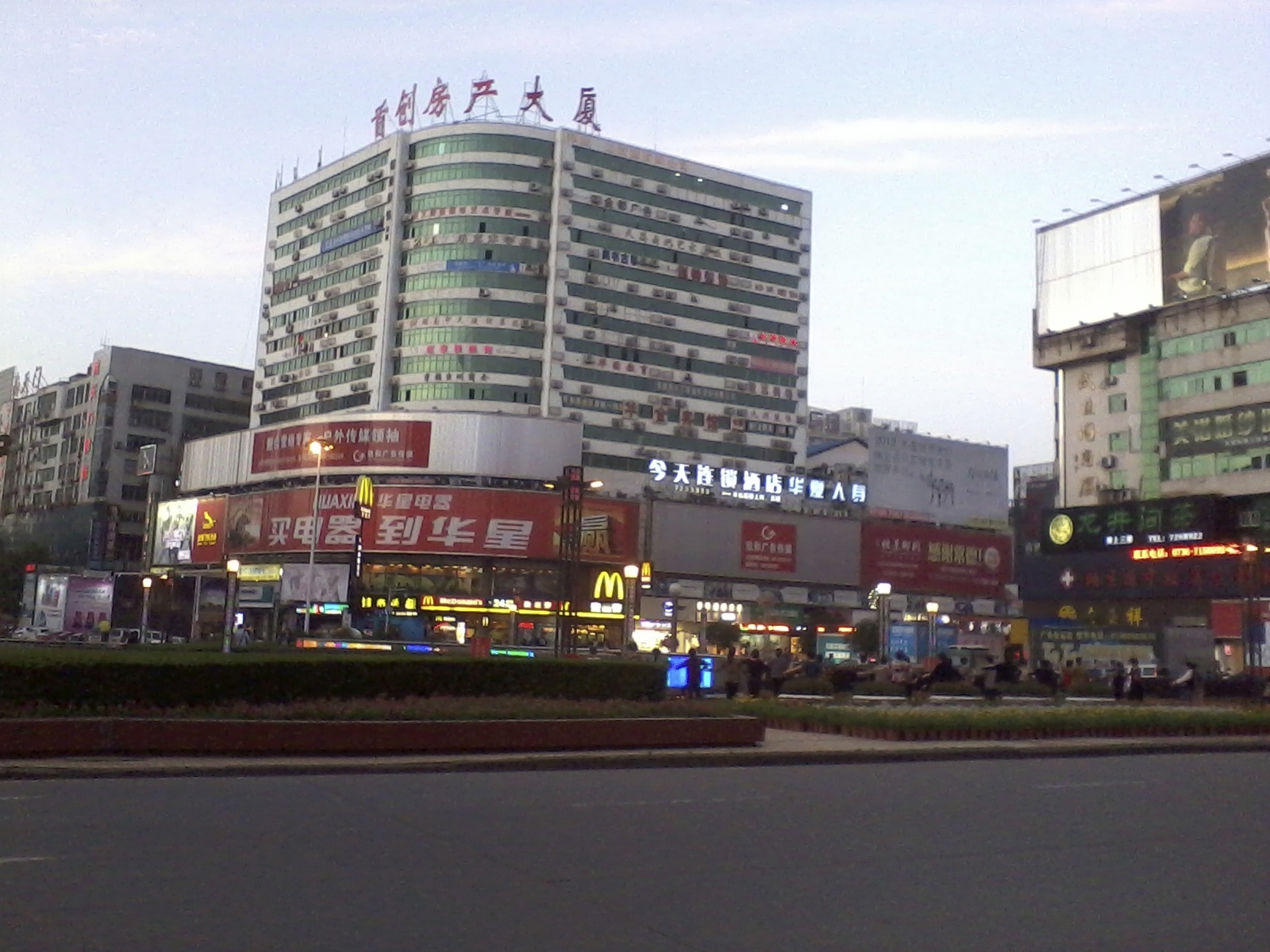
- Corner in Wuling District

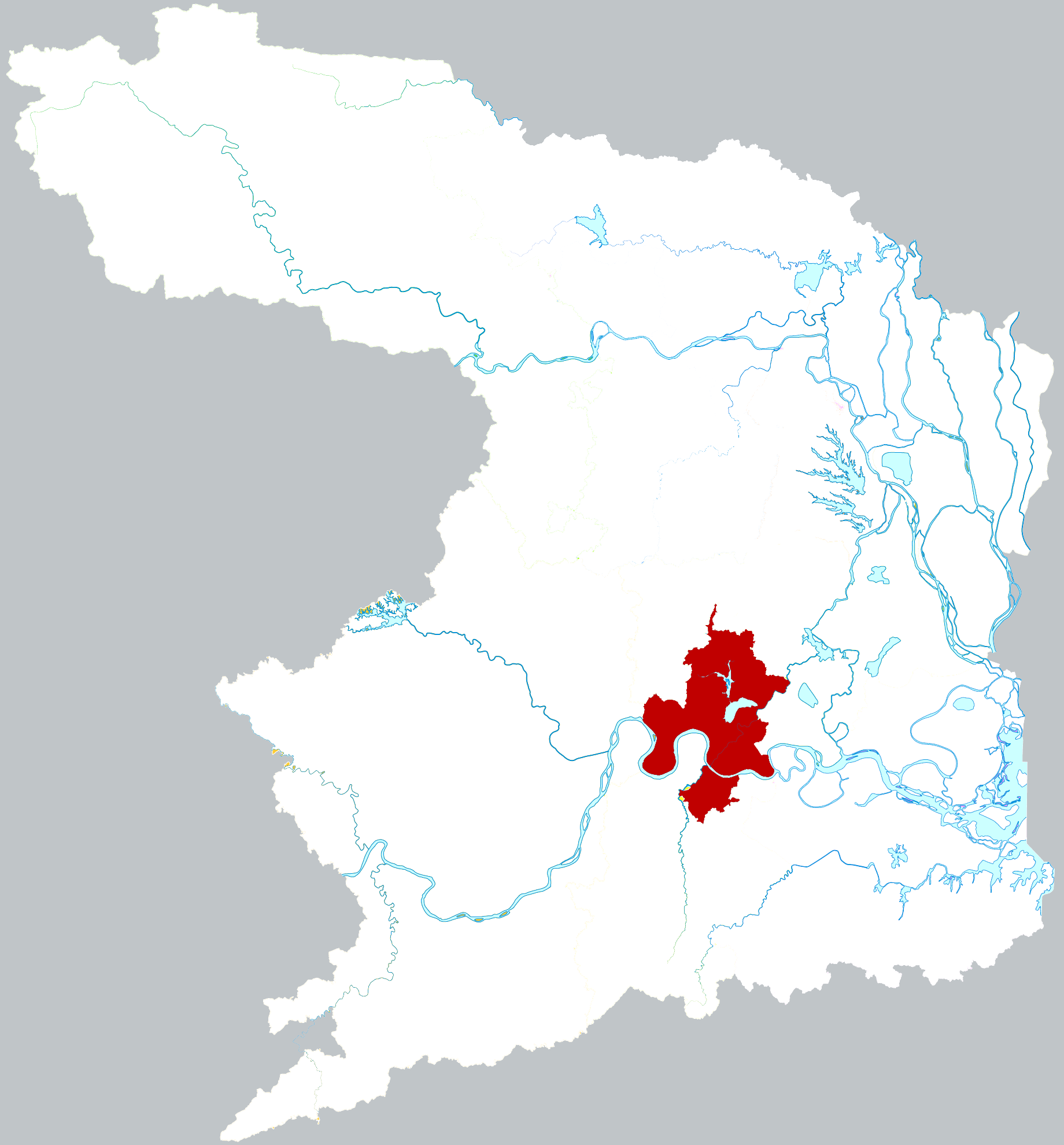
- Location of Wuling District within Changde

- Location in Hunan
- Coordinates: 29°00′45″N 111°42′16″E
- Country: People's Republic of China
- Province: Hunan
- Prefecture-level city: Changde

Area
  - Total: 412.42 km^{2} (159.24 sq mi)

Population
  - Total: 730,900
  - Density: 1,772/km^{2} (4,590/sq mi)
- Time zone: UTC+8 (China Standard)
- Website: www.wuling.gov.cn

Wuling District (simplified Chinese: 武陵区; traditional Chinese: 武陵區; pinyin: Wǔlíng Qū) is one of two urban districts in Changde City, Hunan Province, China. Located on the central area of Changde, the district is surrounded by Dingcheng District to the north and south, bordered to the west by Taoyuan County, and to the east by Hanshou County. Wuling District has an area of 289 kilometres (180 mi) with a registered population of 426,694 (as of 2015). It is divided into 11 subdistricts, one towns and two township, and its government seat is Nanpinggang Subdistrict (南坪街道).

== Administrative divisions ==
According to the result on adjustment of township-level administrative divisions of Wuling District on August 18, 2014, Wuling District has 11 subdistricts, one town and two townships under its jurisdiction. They are:

11 Subdistricts

- Baimahu (白马湖街道)
- Changgeng (长庚街道)
- Chuanzihe (穿紫河街道)
- Danyang (丹阳街道)
- Dongjiang (东江街道)
- Fuping (府坪街道)
- Furong (芙蓉街道)
- Nanpinggang (南坪岗街道)
- Qiming (启明街道)
- Yong'an (永安街道)
- Zhilan (芷兰街道)

1 Town

- Hefu (河洑镇)

2 Townships

- Danzhou (丹洲乡)
- Ludishan (芦荻山乡)
