= Taohuayuan (Hunan) =

Scenic area in Hunan, China

Coordinates: 28.7852°N 111.42°E

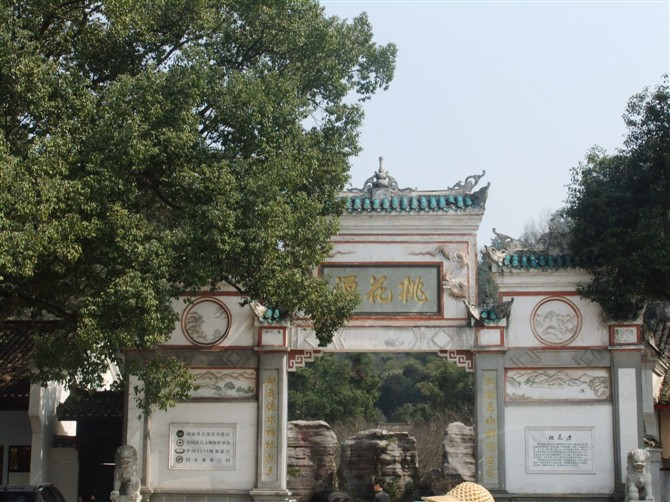

Taohuayuan (Chinese: 桃花源, meaning "Peach blossom source") is a scenic area in Taoyuan County, Hunan, China, in memory of Tao Yuanming's The Peach Blossom Spring.

It has been a sacred Taoist site since the Tang dynasty.

Taohuayuan was made an AAAAA-level national forest park in 2020.

== See also ==
- Tourism in Hunan Province
