= Zekai Özger =

Turkish poet (born 1948)

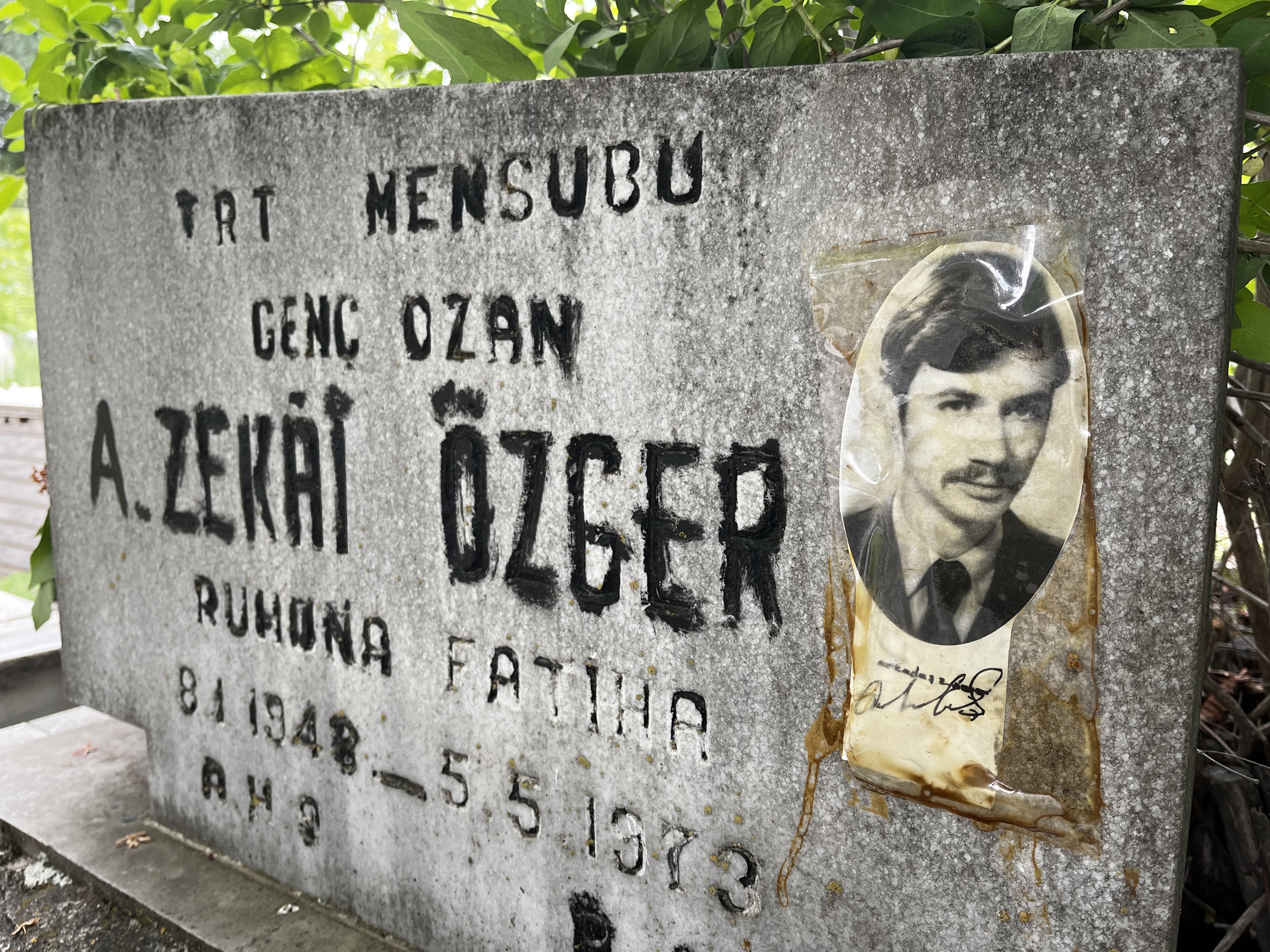
- The headstone of Arkadaş Zekai Özger and the photograph on it.
- Born: January 8, 1948; Bursa, Turkey
- Died: May 5, 1973 (aged 25); Ankara, Turkey
- Education: Journalism
- Alma mater: Faculty of Political Science, Ankara University
- Occupation: Poet
- Relatives: Ali Özger (Father), Fahriye Özger (Mother), 6 sibling's
- Writing career
- Pen name: Arkadaş Z. Özger

Zekai Özger (January 8, 1948 – May 5, 1973), better known under his pen name Arkadaş Z. Özger, was a young Turkish poet.

== Personal life ==
Zekai Özger was born on January 8, 1948, in Bursa, Turkey to a low-income family as the fifth child of seven siblings. His father, Ali, was a public worker and his mother, Fahriye, a homemaker. In his youth, he spent months in the hospital due to a bone disease he had contracted.

He was schooled at Altıparmak Primary School in Bursa, then finished Atatürk High School in his hometown, and studied at the Journalism College at the Political Science of Ankara University. After graduating, Özger began working as a film editor at the Turkish Radio and Television Corporation in Ankara.

One evening, he left his home, where he had no television set, to watch a broadcast at the TV station, where he had worked. That night, he did not return home. In the morning hours of May 5, 1973, he was found dead in a street. The forensic autopsy showed no sign of injuries, but it stated that the cause of death was cerebral hemorrhage. It was assumed that this could be the result of a severe head injury he had suffered during a police raid on the university campus in the chaotic era of March 12, 1971.

== Poet ==
Özger began writing poems in his high school years, and continued during his higher education and thereafter. Poetry was his entire world. He published his poems under the pen name Arkadaş Z. Özger. Arkadaş is the Turkish word for "friend".

His first poem, Tragedy of a beardless boy, was published in 1967. Publication of his poems and writings continued to appear in the magazines such as Soyut, Forum, Papirüs, Yordam, Dost and Yansıma, as well as in the newspaper Ulus.

During his life, he had no opportunity to publish his works in a book. A year after his death, a collection of his poems that had been published in various newspapers and magazines, was gathered by his friends and published in a book titled Şiirler ("Poems") by Nadas in 1974. This book's expanded second edition was released under the title Sevdadır ("It's Love") by Mayıs Publishing. The poetry book of Özger has reached its 6th edition in an expanded version.

Özger did not openly talk about his sexuality, and no reliable sources exist, except for some of his works that indirectly imply about his homosexual tendencies, such as Love Zeki Muren (Turkish homosexual singer), Oh, tender son, The soul loves soul, There is nothing beyond this or a poem named Hello!, my dear.

== Legacy ==
The Mayıs Publishing created an award in honor of Arkadaş Z. Özger in 1996. The award is given annually on his death anniversary to a selected literary work of Turkish literature.

Winners of "Arkadaş Z. Özger Poetry Award"

- 1996 Gazanfer Eryüksel - Yücelay Sal
- 1997 Zeynep Köylü - Hüseyin Peker
- 1998 Serap Erdoğan - Hüseyin Köse
- 1999 Kuvvet Yurdakul
- 2000 Sadık Yaşar
- 2001 Mehmet Kâzım - Bâki Asiltürk
- 2002 Bir Şiiri İnceleme by Bahtiyar Kaymak
- 2003 Nesrin Kültür Kiraz
- 2004 Ertuğrul Deveci
- 2005 Cuma Duymaz - Sinan Oruçoğlu
- 2006 Hayriye Ersöz
- 2007 Ersun Çıplak
- 2008 Bir Şiiri İnceleme by Halil İbrahim Özbay
- 2009 Nurullah Kuzu
- 2010 Gökhan Arslan
- 2011 Hayati Çitaklar
- 2012 Murat Acar
- 2013 Turgut Uyar’ın ‘Geyikli Gece’ Şiiri Üzerine Bir İnceleme by Şerif Mehmet Uğurlu

On 5 May 2010, a "Poet Arkadaş Z. Özger Meeting" was organized in Ankara during the 5th "International Meeting Against Homophobia" for the first time.

In 2021, a documentary film was made by Ulaş Tosun named after Arkadaş Z. Özger's poem "Merhaba Canım" (Hello My Dear) which first appeared in Dost Magazine in 1970.
