= Linli County =

Linli County 临澧县
- County
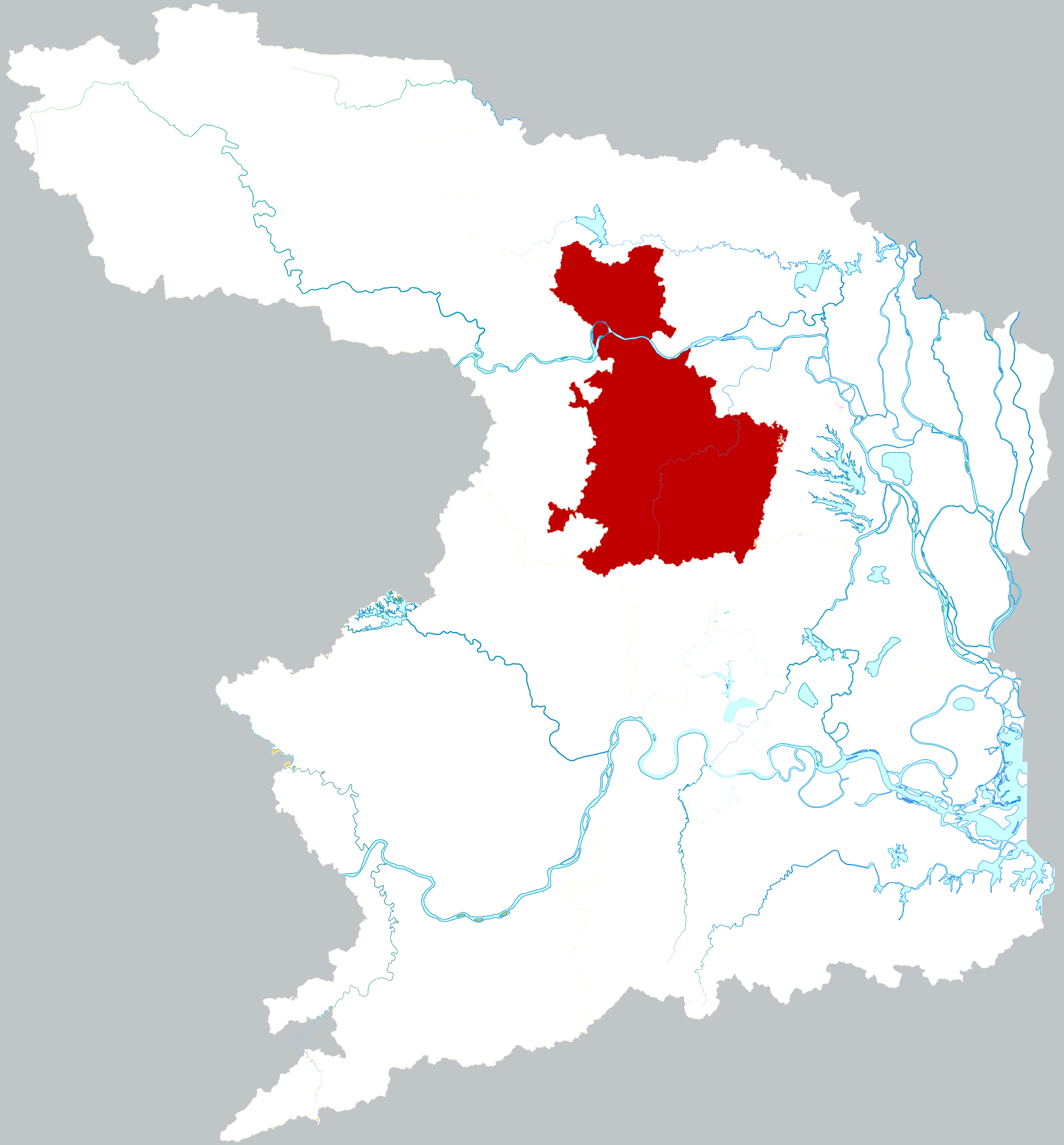
- Location of Linli County within Changde

- Location in Hunan
- Coordinates: 29°30′47″N 111°38′10″E
- Country: People's Republic of China
- Province: Hunan
- Prefecture-level city: Changde

Area
  - Total: 1,209.58 km^{2} (467.02 sq mi)

Population
  - Total: 373,100
  - Density: 308.5/km^{2} (798.9/sq mi)
- Time zone: UTC+8 (China Standard)
- Website: http://www.linli.gov.cn

Linli (simplified Chinese: 临澧县; traditional Chinese: 臨澧縣; pinyin: Línlǐ Xiàn) is a county in Hunan Province, China. It is under the administration of the prefecture-level city of Changde. The county is located on the north in Hunan, the north-central part of Changde's administration. It borders to the north by Li County, to the east by Jinshi City, to the south by Taoyuan County and Dingcheng District, and to the west by Shimen County. It has an area of 1,203.43 kilometres (747.78 mi) with a registered population of 505,609 and a permanent population of 400,839 (as of 2010 Census). It is divided into eight towns and two townships under its jurisdiction, and the county seat is Anfu Subdistrict (安福街道).

== Administrative divisions ==
Through the adjustment of township-level administrative divisions of Linli County in 2015 and 2017, Linli County has seven towns, two townships and two sub-districts under its jurisdiction. They are:

2 subdistricts

- Anfu Subdistrict (安福街道)
- Wangcheng Subdistrict (望城街道)

7 towns

- Hekou (合口镇)
- Sheshiqiao (佘市桥镇)
- Sixingang (四新岗镇)
- Taifu (太浮镇)
- Tingxuandu (停弦渡镇)
- Xin'an (新安镇)
- Xiumei (修梅镇)

2 townships

- Fenghuo (烽火乡)
- Kemushan (刻木山乡)

== Climate ==
Climate data for Linli, elevation 89 m (292 ft), (1991–2020 normals, extremes 1959–present)
Month	Jan	Feb	Mar	Apr	May	Jun	Jul	Aug	Sep	Oct	Nov	Dec	Year
Record high °C (°F)	24.8 (76.6)	30.1 (86.2)	34.5 (94.1)	35.7 (96.3)	37.9 (100.2)	38.0 (100.4)	40.0 (104.0)	40.7 (105.3)	40.0 (104.0)	38.4 (101.1)	31.1 (88.0)	25.6 (78.1)	40.7 (105.3)
Mean daily maximum °C (°F)	8.6 (47.5)	11.4 (52.5)	16.2 (61.2)	22.4 (72.3)	26.8 (80.2)	29.8 (85.6)	32.7 (90.9)	32.2 (90.0)	28.2 (82.8)	22.9 (73.2)	17.0 (62.6)	11.2 (52.2)	21.6 (70.9)
Daily mean °C (°F)	4.6 (40.3)	7.1 (44.8)	11.5 (52.7)	17.5 (63.5)	22.2 (72.0)	25.7 (78.3)	28.5 (83.3)	27.9 (82.2)	23.6 (74.5)	18.0 (64.4)	12.2 (54.0)	6.8 (44.2)	17.1 (62.9)
Mean daily minimum °C (°F)	1.7 (35.1)	3.9 (39.0)	8.0 (46.4)	13.6 (56.5)	18.5 (65.3)	22.4 (72.3)	25.2 (77.4)	24.7 (76.5)	20.2 (68.4)	14.5 (58.1)	8.8 (47.8)	3.5 (38.3)	13.8 (56.8)
Record low °C (°F)	−15.7 (3.7)	−11.2 (11.8)	−1.9 (28.6)	0.2 (32.4)	8.2 (46.8)	13.0 (55.4)	18.7 (65.7)	16.2 (61.2)	10.2 (50.4)	2.4 (36.3)	−4.2 (24.4)	−8.3 (17.1)	−15.7 (3.7)
Average precipitation mm (inches)	53.1 (2.09)	64.0 (2.52)	99.4 (3.91)	142.4 (5.61)	187.4 (7.38)	193.6 (7.62)	193.5 (7.62)	119.5 (4.70)	86.9 (3.42)	84.3 (3.32)	67.1 (2.64)	30.8 (1.21)	1,322 (52.04)
Average precipitation days (≥ 0.1 mm)	11.0	11.2	13.5	13.7	14.6	13.6	11.7	9.8	8.8	11.0	10.2	8.6	137.7
Average snowy days	4.4	2.9	1.1	0	0	0	0	0	0	0	0.2	1.6	10.2
Average relative humidity (%)	77	77	77	77	77	81	79	78	78	78	79	76	78
Mean monthly sunshine hours	76.3	75.2	103.4	130.4	147.6	142.2	206.0	207.4	153.6	129.4	112.3	96.8	1,580.6
Percentage possible sunshine	23	24	28	34	35	34	48	51	42	37	35	30	35
Source: China Meteorological Administration

== Transportation ==
The area is served by Linli railway station on the Shimen–Changsha railway.
