= Anxiang County =

Anxiang County 安乡县 Ansiang
- County
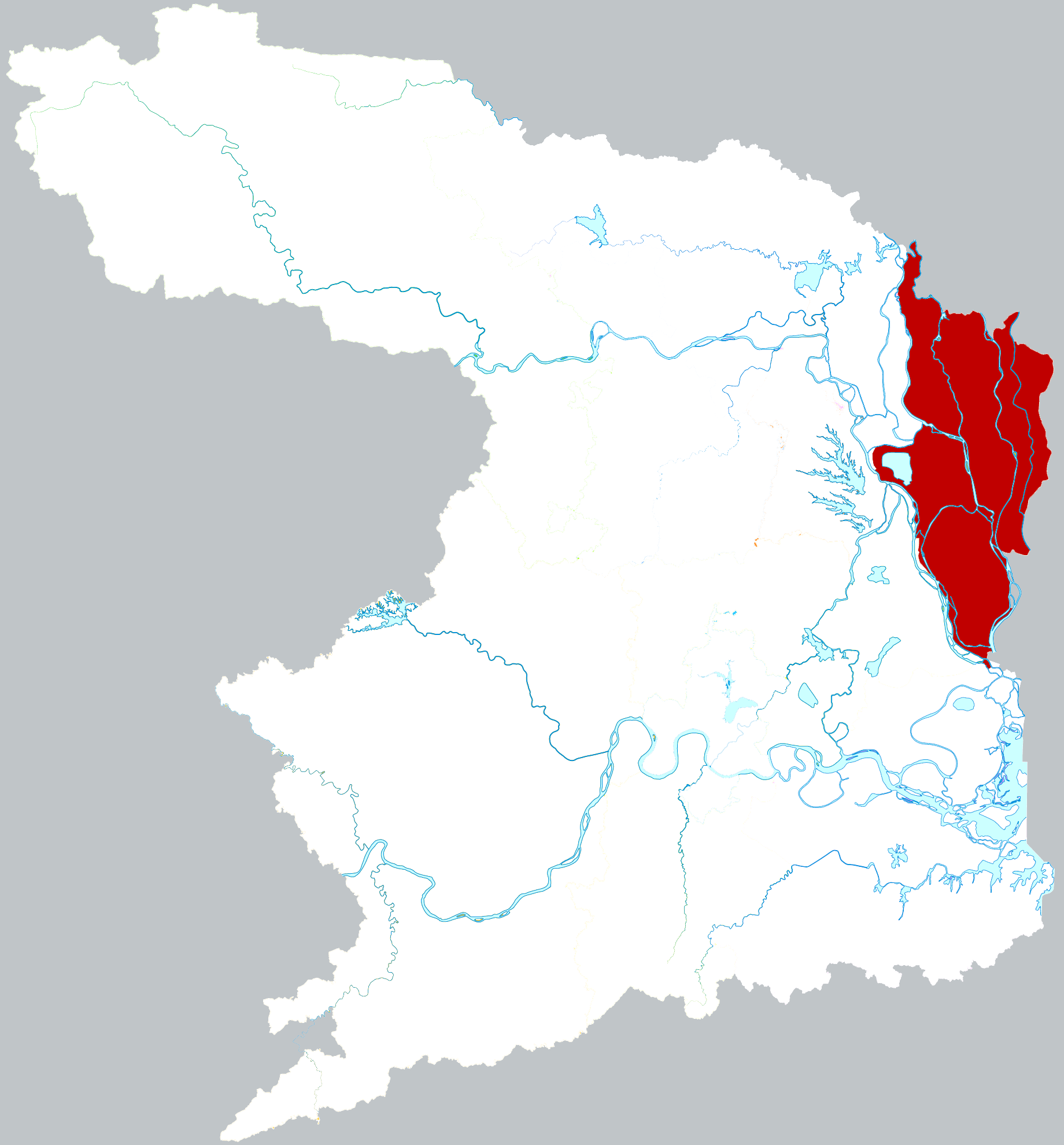
- Location of Anxiang County within Changde

- Location of the seat in Hunan
- Coordinates: 29°24′18″N 112°12′04″E
- Country: People's Republic of China
- Province: Hunan
- Prefecture-level city: Changde

Area
  - Total: 1,087 km^{2} (420 sq mi)

Population
  - Total: 427,400
  - Density: 393.2/km^{2} (1,018/sq mi)
- Time zone: UTC+8 (China Standard)
- Website: www.anxiang.gov.cn

Anxiang County (simplified Chinese: 安乡县; traditional Chinese: 安鄉縣; pinyin: Ānxiāng Xiàn) is a county in Hunan Province, China, under the administration of the prefecture-level city of Changde. The county is located at one of the inflows of Dongting Lake, on the north in Hunan Province and the southeast in Changde City, and it borders in the north to Gong'an County, in the west to Li County, Jinshi City and Dingcheng District, the south by Nan County, and the east by Shishou City. The county has an area of 1,087 kilometres (675 mi) with 602,299 of registered population and 525,619 of permanent resident population (as of 2010 census). It is divided into eight towns and four townships under its jurisdiction. The county seat is Shenliu (深柳镇).

Anxiang was established as Zuotang County in 40 AD, gaining its current name during the Northern and Southern dynasties period.

== Administrative divisions ==
According to the result on adjustment of township-level administrative divisions of Anxiang County on November 19, 2015 Anxiang County has eight towns and four townships under its jurisdiction. They are:

8 Towns

- Shenliu (深柳镇), county seat
- Huangshantou (黄山头镇)
- Xiayukou (下渔口镇)
- Guandang (官垱镇)
- Sanchahe (三岔河镇)
- Dajinggang (大鲸港镇)
- Dahukou (大湖口镇)
- Chenjiazui (陈家嘴镇)

4 Townships

- Anzhang (安障乡)
- Anquan (安全乡)
- Ankang (安康乡)
- Anfeng (安丰乡)

== Climate ==
Climate data for Anxiang, elevation 34 m (112 ft), (1991–2020 normals, extremes 1981–present)
Month	Jan	Feb	Mar	Apr	May	Jun	Jul	Aug	Sep	Oct	Nov	Dec	Year
Record high °C (°F)	22.3 (72.1)	28.0 (82.4)	32.4 (90.3)	34.8 (94.6)	35.2 (95.4)	37.2 (99.0)	38.3 (100.9)	39.1 (102.4)	37.2 (99.0)	33.9 (93.0)	29.8 (85.6)	22.9 (73.2)	39.1 (102.4)
Mean daily maximum °C (°F)	8.4 (47.1)	11.3 (52.3)	15.9 (60.6)	22.2 (72.0)	26.9 (80.4)	30.0 (86.0)	32.9 (91.2)	32.3 (90.1)	28.3 (82.9)	23.0 (73.4)	17.0 (62.6)	11.0 (51.8)	21.6 (70.9)
Daily mean °C (°F)	5.0 (41.0)	7.6 (45.7)	11.9 (53.4)	17.8 (64.0)	22.6 (72.7)	26.1 (79.0)	28.9 (84.0)	28.3 (82.9)	24.1 (75.4)	18.7 (65.7)	12.9 (55.2)	7.3 (45.1)	17.6 (63.7)
Mean daily minimum °C (°F)	2.6 (36.7)	4.8 (40.6)	8.8 (47.8)	14.4 (57.9)	19.2 (66.6)	23.1 (73.6)	25.8 (78.4)	25.3 (77.5)	21.1 (70.0)	15.7 (60.3)	10.0 (50.0)	4.7 (40.5)	14.6 (58.3)
Record low °C (°F)	−6.9 (19.6)	−4.6 (23.7)	−1.2 (29.8)	2.1 (35.8)	9.0 (48.2)	13.5 (56.3)	18.9 (66.0)	16.4 (61.5)	10.5 (50.9)	4.1 (39.4)	−0.9 (30.4)	−6.5 (20.3)	−6.9 (19.6)
Average precipitation mm (inches)	57.3 (2.26)	68.2 (2.69)	108.4 (4.27)	151.1 (5.95)	176.0 (6.93)	191.2 (7.53)	186.0 (7.32)	120.0 (4.72)	70.8 (2.79)	81.4 (3.20)	72.7 (2.86)	32.9 (1.30)	1,316 (51.82)
Average precipitation days (≥ 0.1 mm)	11.1	11.3	13.9	14.0	14.3	13.1	10.9	9.7	8.8	10.8	10.1	8.5	136.5
Average snowy days	4.4	2.7	1	0	0	0	0	0	0	0	0.3	1.6	10
Average relative humidity (%)	76	76	77	77	77	80	79	78	77	76	76	73	77
Mean monthly sunshine hours	86.7	86.1	110.6	137.1	159.6	155.3	211.9	215.4	163.4	145.3	128.1	107.3	1,706.8
Percentage possible sunshine	27	27	30	35	38	37	50	53	45	41	40	34	38
Source: China Meteorological Administration

== Famous residents ==
- Fan Zhongyan (989 – 1052), writer
- Yin Keng (阴铿, 511－563), writer
