= Changde =

Changde 常德市 Changte; Changteh
- Prefecture-level city
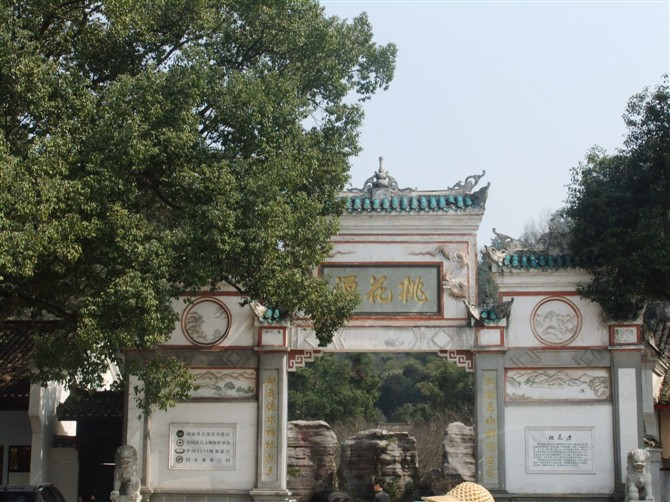
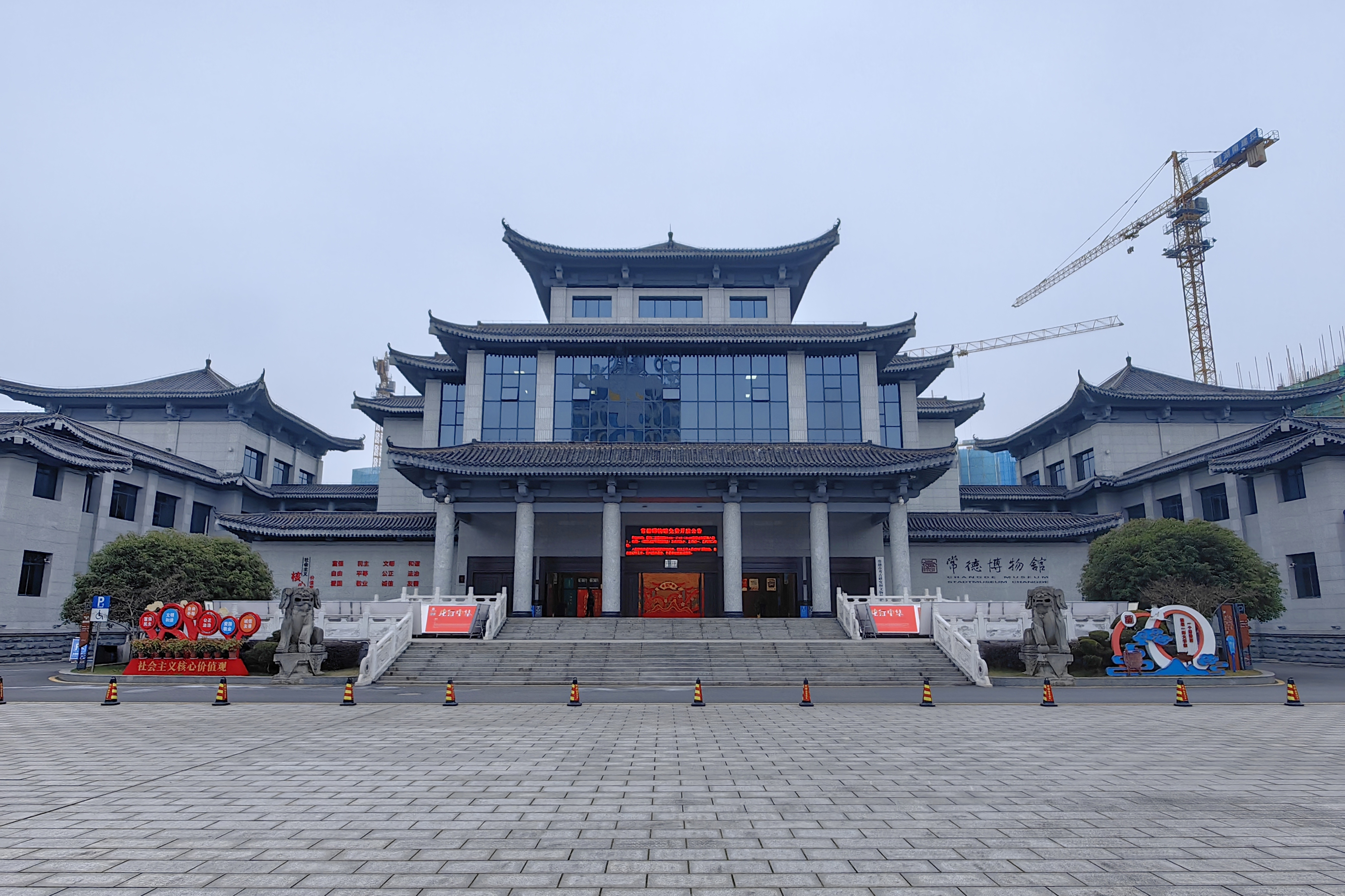
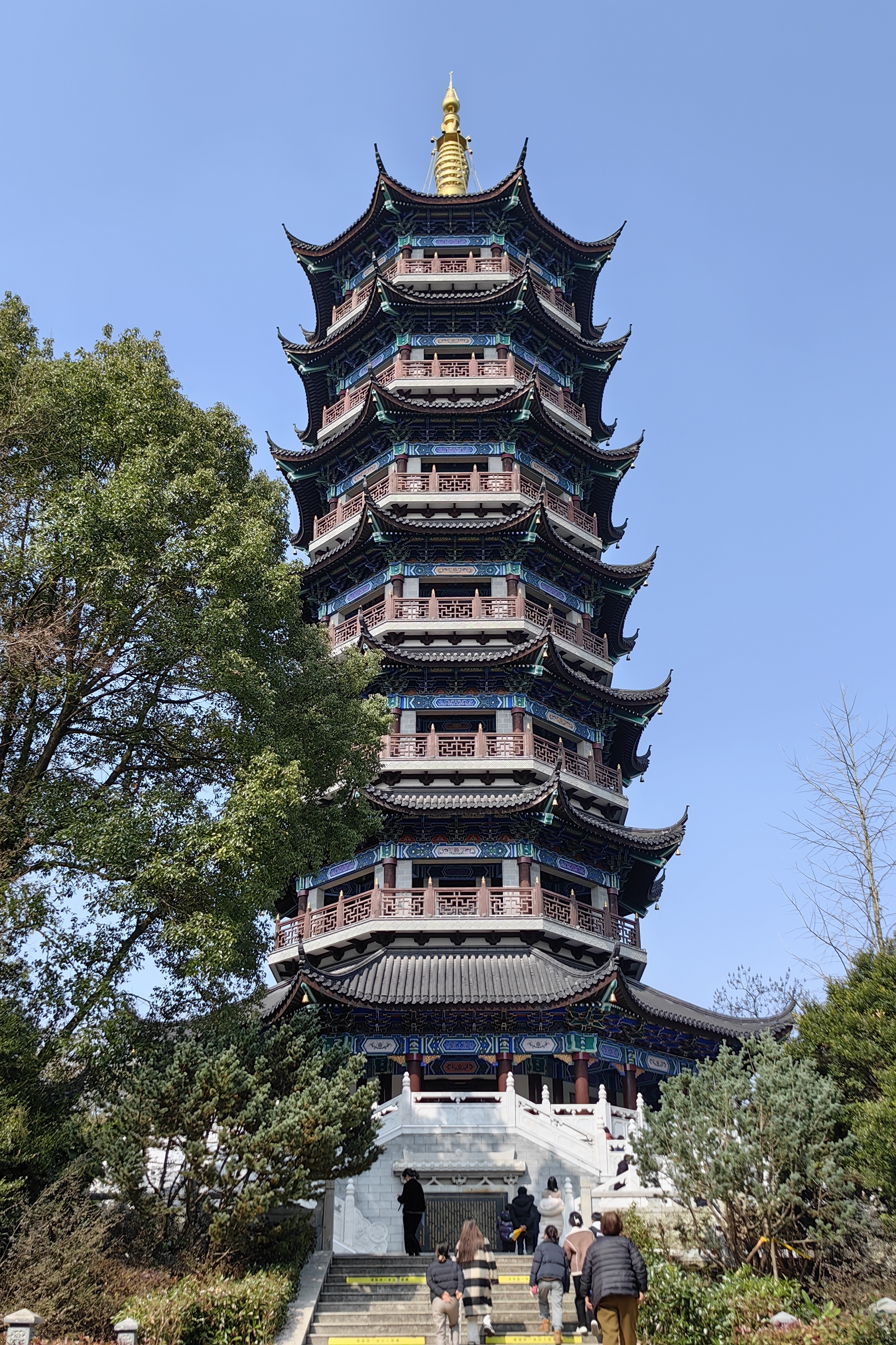
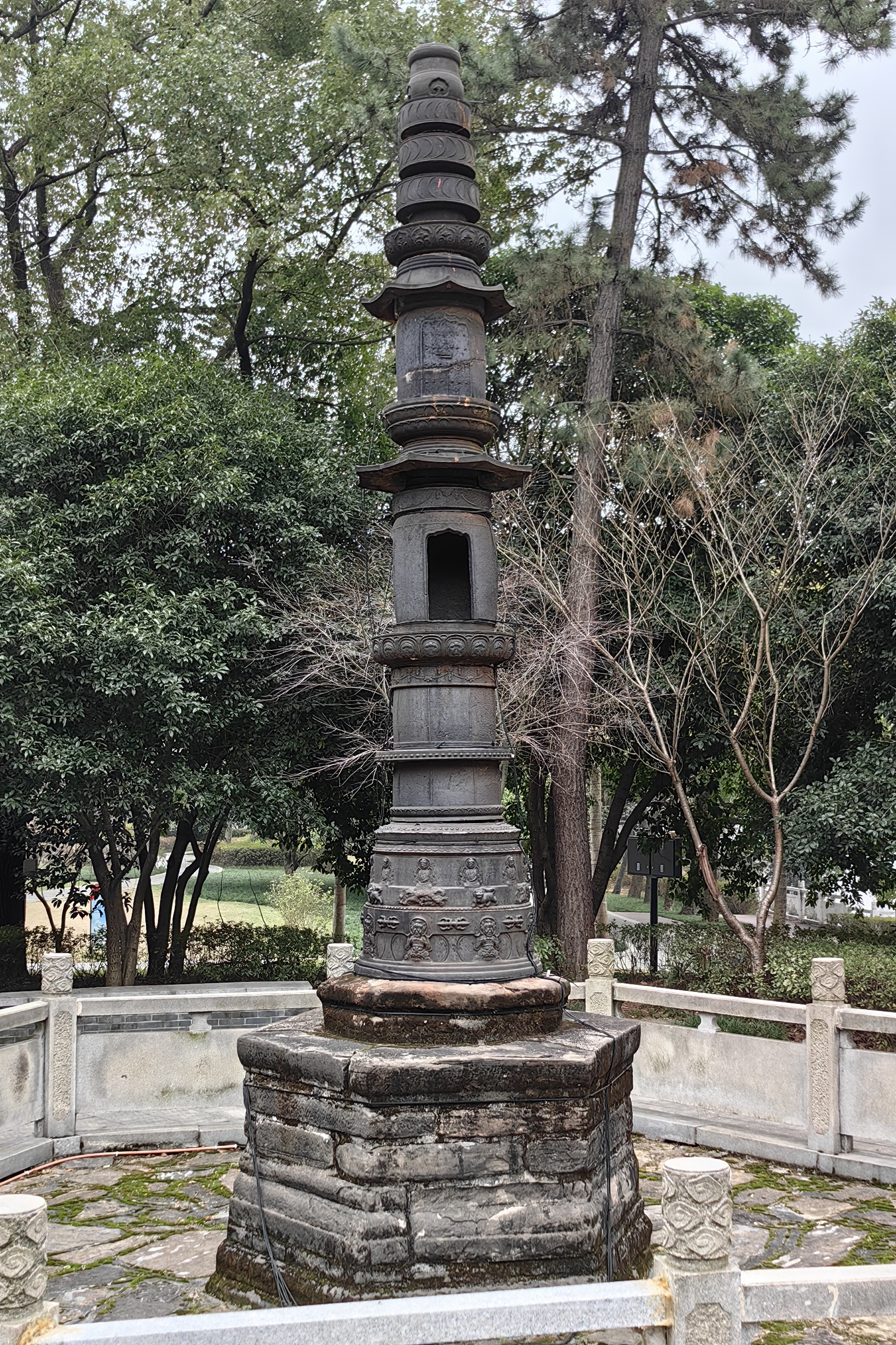
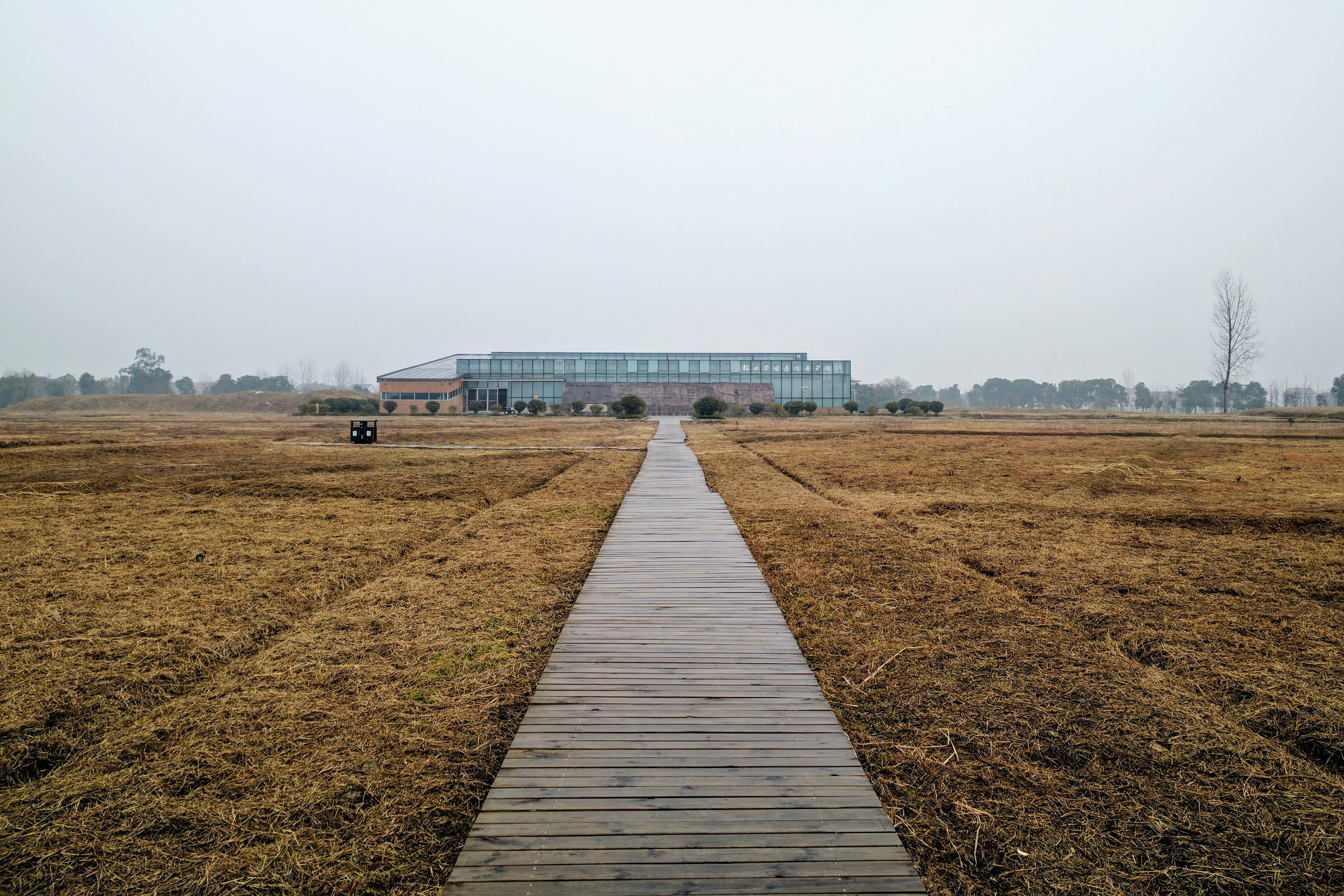
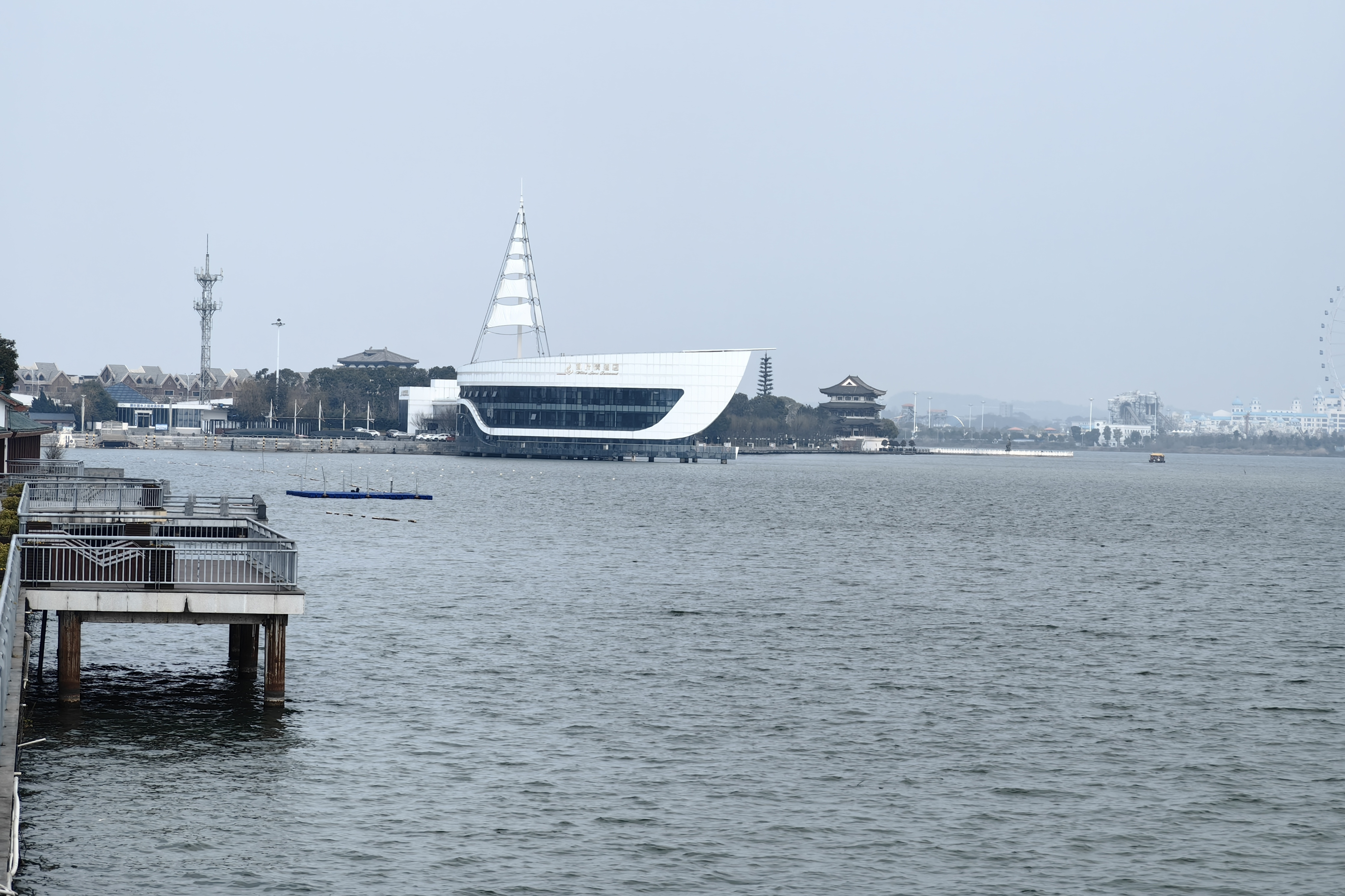
- Taohuayuan Changde Museum Gufeng Pagoda Changde Iron Dhvaja Chengtoushan Liuye Lake

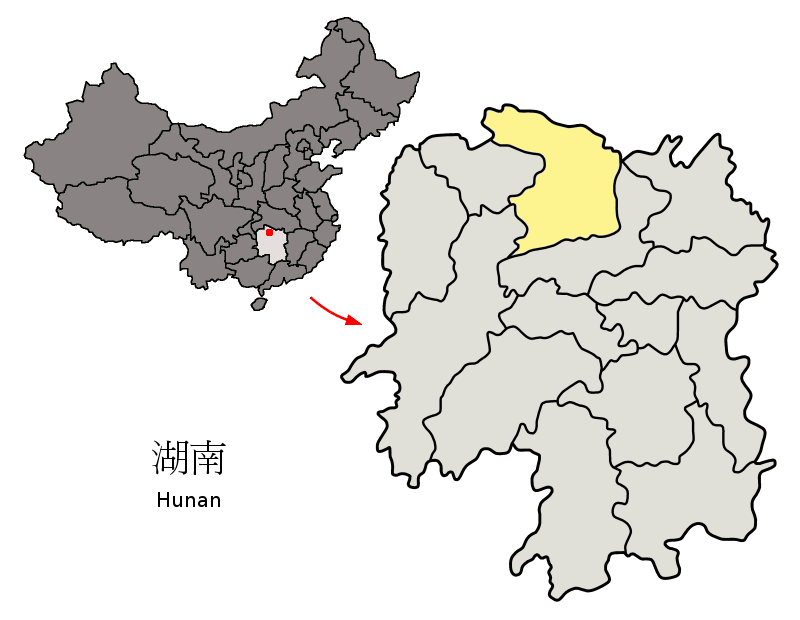
- Location of Changde jurisdiction in Hunan

- Location of the city centre in Hunan
- Coordinates (Changde municipal government): 29°01′52″N 111°41′56″E
- Country: People's Republic of China
- Province: Hunan
- Municipal seat: Wuling District

Government
  - Mayor: Zhou Zhenyu (周振宇)
  - Party Secretary: Wang Qun (王群)

Area
  - Prefecture-level city: 18,177 km^{2} (7,018 sq mi)
  - Urban: 2,752 km^{2} (1,063 sq mi)
  - Metro: 2,752 km^{2} (1,063 sq mi)
- Elevation: 35 m (115 ft)

Population (2020 census)
  - Prefecture-level city: 5,279,102
  - Density: 290.43/km^{2} (752.20/sq mi)
  - Urban: 1,469,055
  - Urban density: 533.8/km^{2} (1,383/sq mi)
  - Metro: 1,469,055
  - Metro density: 533.8/km^{2} (1,383/sq mi)

GDP
  - Prefecture-level city: CN¥ 427.5 billion US$ 63.4 billion
  - Per capita: CN¥ 80,980; US$ 12,042
- Time zone: UTC+8 (China Standard)
- Postal code: 415000
- Area code: 0736
- ISO 3166 code: CN-HN-07
- License plate: 湘J
- City tree: Camphor laurel
- City flower: Gardenia
- Website: eng.changde.gov.cn (in English)

Changde (Chinese: 常德; pinyin: Chángdé; traditional Chinese: 常德 [ʈʂʰǎŋ.tɤ̌]) is a prefecture-level city in the northwest of Hunan province, People's Republic of China. Changde, known as "Wuling" in ancient times, is located on the west side of Dongting Lake in the south of the Yangtze River, at the foot of Wuling Mountain. It is historically known as "the throat of Sichuan and Guizhou, and the gateway to Yunnan and Guizhou". In addition to the urban districts, Changde also administers the county-level city of Jinshi and six counties. Changde is adjacent to Dongting Lake to the east, the city of Yiyang to the south, Wuling and Xuefeng Mountains to the west, and Hubei province to the north.

The area has been inhabited by humans since around 8,000 years ago. In that time, the city has changed names several times, but it has been known as Changde since the 12th century. The city is well known for the Battle of Changde during the Second Sino-Japanese War (1937–45) and the atrocities committed then by the Imperial Japanese Army.

In the past decade, the city has seen a massive construction boom. New highrises have sprung up, roads were rebuilt and new schools, parks and museums have opened. Locals and tourists often visit the Changde Poetry Wall, covered in a variety of poems mostly from ancient China. The wall stretches for 3 kilometres (1.9 mi) along the Yuan River downtown and functions as a flood wall. It is listed in the Guinness Book of World Records as the longest wall with engraved arts in the world.

== History ==
=== Prehistory ===
Changde is known for its many Paleolithic and Neolithic sites. About 500 of them have been discovered to date. In 1984 neolithic human settlements were discovered in Li County, part of Changde. In 1988, the Pengtoushan site was excavated leading to the identification of the "Pengtoushan Culture". The site contains the earliest evidence of a settled village yet discovered in China. Archeological research from 2011 suggests that a settlement called Shanlonggang, part of the Pengtoushan civilization, may have cultivated rice 8,000-9,000 years ago, making it the possible birthplace of rice cultivation.

=== Ancient history ===
In historical times it was also a centre from which governments controlled the mountain tribes of western Hunan. A county named Linyuan was established there in the 2nd century BC.

During the Xia, Shang and Western Zhou Dynasties, the local area was under the jurisdiction of Jingzhou.

In the Han dynasty the area was called "Wuling County". The name is retained in the urban Wuling District. In the Sui dynasty, it was called Langzhou. During the Song dynasty, it was called Dingcheng. In the Tang dynasty (618–907) it became the seat of Lang prefecture. In 1117, Changde county was established, and around 1165, Changde superior prefecture/fu was established. The name Changde has been used for the city ever since. This status was retained until 1912, when the superior prefecture was abolished and the city became a county seat.

=== 19th and early 20th centuries ===
In the late 19th century Changde became a prosperous commercial center and the chief agricultural central market of the Yuan River basin. Many Chinese firms, and — after 1905, when it was opened to foreign trade — foreign firms as well, maintained branches there to buy rice, cotton, tung oil, and timber, so that Changde's economic influence reached out into northern Guizhou, southwestern Hubei, and parts of southeastern Sichuan province. The merchants of the Taho quarter of the city controlled much of the northwestern Hunan economy, and early in the 20th century Changde was the second city of Hunan, after Changsha.

=== Second World War ===
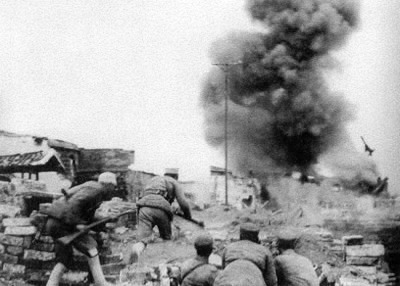
Chinese soldiers defending Changde

In the 1943 Battle of Changde, the Kuomintang's National Revolutionary Army attempted to stop the invading Imperial Japanese Army from completing their invasion of Sichuan. Frustrated, the Japanese side employed chemical weapons to clear their way. During the Khabarovsk War Crime Trials, proof was presented of operations to contaminate the area with plague as early as 1941 and 1942.

=== People's Republic ===
Although the commercial dominance of Changde firms disappeared with the advent of communist rule in 1949, the city remained an important center of trade, with the majority of its population engaged either in commerce or in transportation.

In 1975, Changde was hit by Typhoon Nina.

== Geography ==
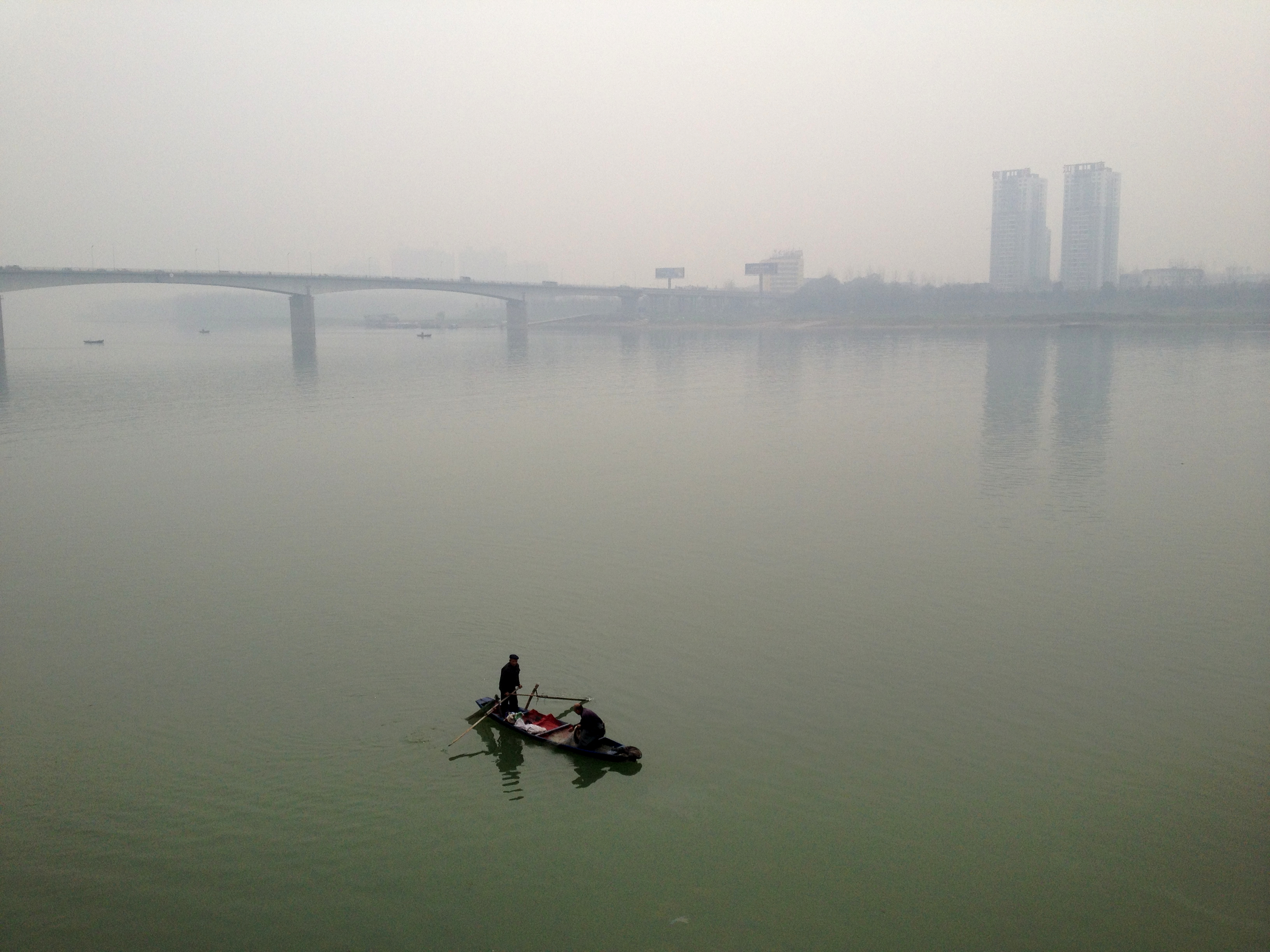
Two fishermen on the Yuan river in downtown Changde. The bridge and Jiangnan district can be seen in the background.

Located on the Yuan River upstream from its junction with the Lake Dongting system, Changde is a natural center of the northwest Hunan plain. The city was historically situated on the north bank of the Yuan River, and has since expanded development south of the river. The Chinese phrase "三山三水" (literally "Three mountains and three rivers") is often used in reference to the general physical geography of the city. Around the city are three nearby mountains- Taiyang Mountain (太阳山) to the north, Mount De (德山) to the south, and Mount Hefu (河洑山) in the west. In addition to the Yuan River, the city has plentiful water resources with the Chuanzi and Xin Rivers both flowing through Wuling urban district. The other major geographic feature of the area is Liuye Lake (柳叶湖), to the northeast of the city center. There are also numerous lakes, ponds, and streams in the city although many have been diverted or buried.

The larger prefecture-level city of Changde is adjacent to Dongting Lake to the east, the city of Yiyang to the south, Wuling and Xuefeng Mountains to the west, and Hubei province to the north. Near the border with Hubei province in Shimen county is Huping Mountain (壶瓶山), the highest peaks in Hunan province with an altitude of 2,099 metres (6,886 ft).

The Xuefeng and Wuling mountains have historically been part of the native habitat of the South China tiger. This species is critically endangered and believed to be extinct in the wild. In recent years, the Chinese government has worked to identify potential sites for the establishment of a tiger reserve for the reintroduction of captive-born tigers into the wild. Hupingshan-Houhe National Natural Reserve Complex in Shimen county was selected as one of several potential sites.

=== Climate ===
It has a monsoon-influenced, four-season humid subtropical climate (Köppen Cfa), with cool, damp winters, and hot, humid summers. Winter begins relatively dry but not sunny and becomes progressively damper and cloudier; spring brings frequent rain and the highest humidity levels of the year. Summer is comparatively sunny, while autumn is somewhat dry. The monthly 24-hour average temperatures ranges from 5.0 °C (41.0 °F) in January to 28.9 °C (84.0 °F) in July, while the annual mean is 17.37 °C (63.3 °F). The annual precipitation is about 1,366 mm (54 in). With monthly percent possible sunshine ranging from 22% in February and March to 53% in July, the city receives 1,602 hours of bright sunshine annually. Changde's greatest danger is floods. Floods occur about once every two years, and major floods occur about once every four years. Floods are more common than droughts.

Climate data for Changde, elevation 151 m (495 ft), (1991–2020 normals, extremes 1951–present)
Month	Jan	Feb	Mar	Apr	May	Jun	Jul	Aug	Sep	Oct	Nov	Dec	Year
Record high °C (°F)	25.0 (77.0)	30.3 (86.5)	35.6 (96.1)	37.7 (99.9)	37.5 (99.5)	38.6 (101.5)	40.4 (104.7)	41.7 (107.1)	38.9 (102.0)	39.0 (102.2)	31.0 (87.8)	25.8 (78.4)	41.7 (107.1)
Mean daily maximum °C (°F)	8.5 (47.3)	11.7 (53.1)	15.8 (60.4)	22.3 (72.1)	27.2 (81.0)	30.2 (86.4)	33.2 (91.8)	32.4 (90.3)	28.5 (83.3)	23.0 (73.4)	17.5 (63.5)	11.4 (52.5)	21.8 (71.3)
Daily mean °C (°F)	5.0 (41.0)	7.9 (46.2)	11.7 (53.1)	17.8 (64.0)	22.6 (72.7)	26.1 (79.0)	29.1 (84.4)	28.2 (82.8)	24.2 (75.6)	18.6 (65.5)	13.1 (55.6)	7.6 (45.7)	17.7 (63.8)
Mean daily minimum °C (°F)	2.5 (36.5)	5.2 (41.4)	8.6 (47.5)	14.5 (58.1)	19.2 (66.6)	23.1 (73.6)	25.9 (78.6)	25.2 (77.4)	21.1 (70.0)	15.7 (60.3)	10.1 (50.2)	5.0 (41.0)	14.7 (58.4)
Record low °C (°F)	−13.2 (8.2)	−8.4 (16.9)	−2 (28)	0.3 (32.5)	7.9 (46.2)	13.4 (56.1)	18.3 (64.9)	16.3 (61.3)	11.0 (51.8)	3.9 (39.0)	−2.2 (28.0)	−7.2 (19.0)	−13.2 (8.2)
Average precipitation mm (inches)	66.8 (2.63)	76.8 (3.02)	109.4 (4.31)	171.8 (6.76)	181.7 (7.15)	205.5 (8.09)	190.1 (7.48)	112.7 (4.44)	64.5 (2.54)	81.9 (3.22)	70.0 (2.76)	36.7 (1.44)	1,367.9 (53.84)
Average precipitation days	11.5	11.7	15.5	15.0	13.9	14.3	12.6	9.9	8.1	11.0	9.0	9.3	141.8
Average snowy days	5.6	2.7	1.0	0	0	0	0	0	0	0	0.2	1.7	11.2
Average relative humidity (%)	76	75	75	75	74	78	75	76	74	75	74	73	75
Mean monthly sunshine hours	82.1	79.1	103.8	128.4	158.5	152.6	210.2	210.0	159.0	134.8	126.1	101.5	1,646.1
Percentage possible sunshine	25	25	28	33	37	37	49	52	43	38	40	32	37
Source 1: China Meteorological Administration all-time extreme temperature
Source 2: Weather China

== Administrative divisions ==
The municipal executive, legislature and judiciary is in Wuling District, together with the city's Communist Party headquarters and Public security bureau. Wuling sits on the left bank of the Yuan River. Opposite Wuling is the administrative centre for Dingcheng District.

Changde prefecture-level city oversees two districts, one county-level city and six counties:

Map
Name	Chinese	Administrative seat	Post code	Population (2010 census)	Area (km^{2})	Density (per km^{2})	Population (2000 census)
Urban Districts
Wuling District	武陵区	Nanping Subdistrict (南坪街道)	415000	620,973	412	2,084	509,940
Dingcheng District	鼎城区	Hongyun Subdistrict (红云街道)	415100	837,563	2340	342	836,799
County-level City
Jinshi City	津市市	Xianyang Street Subdistrict (襄阳街街道)	415400	251,064	556	450	243,242
Counties
Shimen County	石门县	Chujiang Town (楚江镇)	415300	599,475	3970	151	673,435
Li County	澧县	Liyang Town (澧阳镇)	415500	827,021	2075	399	824,902
Linli County	临澧县	Anfu Town (安福镇)	415200	401,071	1204	333	411,971
Anxiang County	安乡县	Shenliu Town (深柳镇)	415600	525,619	1086	484	543,602
Hanshou County	汉寿县	Longyang Town (龙阳镇)	415900	799,497	2091	383	764,213
Taoyuan County	桃源县	Zhangjiang Town (漳江镇)	415700	854,935	4442	192	932,77

== Economy ==
Tobacco is the most important industry in Changde. Changde Cigarette Factory (CDCF), now a subsidiary of China Tobacco Hunan Industrial Co., Ltd., is one of six key cigarette companies in China and employs 8,300 workers in Changde as of 2013. CDCF is by far Changde's largest industrial concern accounting for 4.22 billion (51.2%) of the city's 8.2 billion total industrial value added in 2012. Changde is also an administrative centre and a storage and shipping point for tung oil, grain, cotton, medicinal herbs, and wood. Manufactures include ceramics, machine tools, textiles, leather, and processed foods. Grain, oil, cotton, and other commodities are loaded into medium-sized ships and taken to Yueyang, Changsha, or Hankou (Wuhan, Hubei province) for onward shipment. Timber is also rafted there and floated across Lake Dongting to Yueyang, and thus to the Yangtze River. After 1949 the city developed some light industry, mostly based on such local products as wood, leather, and bristles.

=== Urban Waterlogging Early Warning System ===
Changde has implemented an advanced urban waterlogging early warning system. Utilizing a network of IoT sensors and AI-based predictive modeling, the system monitors rainfall and water levels in real-time, providing forecasts and alerts for potential flooding in low-lying urban areas. This initiative is part of the city's broader "sponge city" construction efforts to improve climate resilience.

== Demographics ==
Changde is the fifth most populous prefecture-level division in Hunan (after Changsha, Hengyang, Shaoyang and Yongzhou), with a total population of 5,279,102 inhabitants as of the 2020 Chinese census, of which 1,469,055 reside in the built-up area (metro) made of Dingcheng and Wuling Districts. As of the 2010 Chinese census 13.23% of the population was found to be under 15 years old, while the population over 65 comprised 11.43% of the total.

At the end of 2023 and the beginning of 2024, the permanent population will be 5.187 million.

=== Ethnic minorities ===
The Tujia people are native to Shimen county, having occupied parts of the area for over 2000 years. Other significant ethnic minority populations in Changde include the Hui, Uyghur, Miao and Zhuang peoples. Fengshu Hui and Uyghur Autonomous Township (枫树维吾尔族回族乡) in Taoyuan County is the largest Uyghur community outside of Xinjiang Uyghur Autonomous Region. Fengshu is one of four Hui and Uyghur Autonomous Townships in Changde. The other three are Qinglin (青林) also in Taoyuan county, Xujiaqiao (许家桥) in Dingcheng district, and Maojiatan (毛家滩) in Hanshou county. Changde has the largest Hui population in the province. Minority ethnicities represented 7.2% of the total population of Changde in 2010, 0.8% less than in 2000. By far the largest group of ethnic minority residents is the Tujia with 361,200 people or approximately 6.3% of the total population. The Tujia made up over half the population of Shimen county as of 2009. As for the other major minority ethnic groups present in Changde, the Hui, Uyghur, Miao, and Zhuang peoples respectively comprise 0.5% (33,500 people), 0.08% (4,800 people), 0.08% (4,500 people), and 0.02% (1,300 people) of the total population of Changde.

=== Language ===
People of Changde do not speak Hunanese, the locals speak the Chang–He 常鹤 dialect of Southwestern Mandarin.

Most people still speak Mandarin.

== Government ==
The current CPC party secretary of Changde is Zhou Derui, and the current mayor is Cao Lijun.

== Culture ==
=== Dialect ===
The Changde dialect is a variety of Southwestern Mandarin. As such, it lacks the retroflex consonants found in Standard Chinese. Changde dialect adds the initial consonant /ŋ/ not present in standard Chinese. In addition, /n/ and /l/ are merged. The dialect has the same four tones as standard Chinese.

=== Media ===
Changde has two major daily newspapers, the Changde Daily (常德日报) and the Changde Evening News (常德晚报), both published by Changde Daily Media Group (常德日报传媒集团). The Changde Livelihood Newspaper (常德民生报) is published every Monday, Wednesday and Friday by Changde City Broadcasting Department which also manages Changde's local television and radio. The five local television networks run by Changde Television (HNCDTV), a sub-division of Changde City Department of Broadcasting, are Changde News Channel, Changde Public Channel, Changde City Channel, Changde Wuling Channel, and Changde Teletext Channel. The department of broadcasting also manages Changde People's Radio Traffic Channel (97.1 FM) and Changde People's Radio News Channel (105.6 FM).

=== Changde Uyghur culture ===
Taoyuan county's Uyghur community is culturally distinct from the Uyghur communities of Xinjiang. While Islam plays a central role in Xinjiang Uyghur culture, Islam and religious orthodoxy are much less prominent in Changde Uyghur culture. In particular, young Changde Uyghurs often do not practice Islam and consume pork, strictly forbidden among Xinjiang Uyghurs and Muslims in general, but common for the Han Chinese. In addition, the Changde Uyghurs speak Chinese instead of Uyghur. Those who practice Islam also learn Arabic for religious purposes.

=== Local food and beverage ===
Drinking Lei cha, a beverage made from tea and other dry ingredients ground together and steeped in boiled water, is popular in Changde, especially in the urban districts of Wuling and Dingcheng and Taoyuan and Hanshou counties. Wuling Lei cha, as the Changde variety is sometimes called, is usually made with sesame, peanut, meng bean, rice, tea and ginger. According to legend, the custom of drinking lei cha began in Changde over two thousand years ago when general Ma Yuan and his army passed through Wuling county, where Changde is now located. There was a sudden epidemic in the barracks which they were only able to cure with a home remedy given to Ma Yuan by a mysterious old lady. Lei cha has been popular in the region ever since.

=== Arts ===
In the 17th century, folk music from Jiangsu and Zhejiang provinces began influencing the popular music scene in Changde's Yuan and Li river district. A unique style of theatrical folk music called Changde Sixian (常德丝弦; lit. "Changde strings") evolved from this combination. It includes short expressive sections of lyrics spoken and sung in turns in Changde dialect by a group of singers accompanied by traditional Chinese stringed instruments such as the yangqin, pipa, sanxian, and huqin. The traditional repertoire has over 100 songs, most of which are based on history or folklore. After the founding of the People's Republic a modern socialist realist repertoire emerged. Changde Sixian has been revitalized since the 1980s with several songs receiving national awards. The style has also attracted some international attention since a visiting performance by a Changde Sixian troupe to Malaysia. In 2006, the State Council included Changde Sixian in its first national intangible cultural heritage list.

== Transportation ==
Changde has an extensive bus network with most short-distance busses within the city costing either CN¥1 or ¥1.50 depending on air-conditioning. Changde is a pedestrian friendly city with wide tree-lined avenues and streets.

=== Intercity rail ===
The city is connected to the national passenger rail network, with connections to other Chinese cities via Changde Railway Station in Wuling district. Train tickets can be purchased at the station, before departure or once on the train. A planned high-speed Chongqing-Changsha special passenger line will connect Changde with Chongqing, Changsha and other cities along the line at 200 kilometres per hour (120 mph) once completed. The Qianjiang-Zhangjiajie-Changde section has been approved and is expected to begin construction in 2014. The Changde-Changsha section has already begun construction.

=== Bus rapid transit ===
On December 26, 2012, Changde officially launched its bus rapid transit (BRT) system. As of July 2013, the BRT system in Changde has eight lines operating both inside and outside BRT roads. These include the H1 main line running from Changde Bus Station to Deshan Bus Station and seven branch lines, H11, H12, H13, H15, H16, L12, and L13 although there are a total of only 24 BRT stations in the city. The system operates on the same flat fare as the city's normal innercity bus network, charging ¥1 yuan for transit between any two stops on the line except in the summer when the fare increases to ¥1.50. Changde BRT uses Huanghai CNG busses. The stations are located in the center of the roadway.

=== Public bike service ===
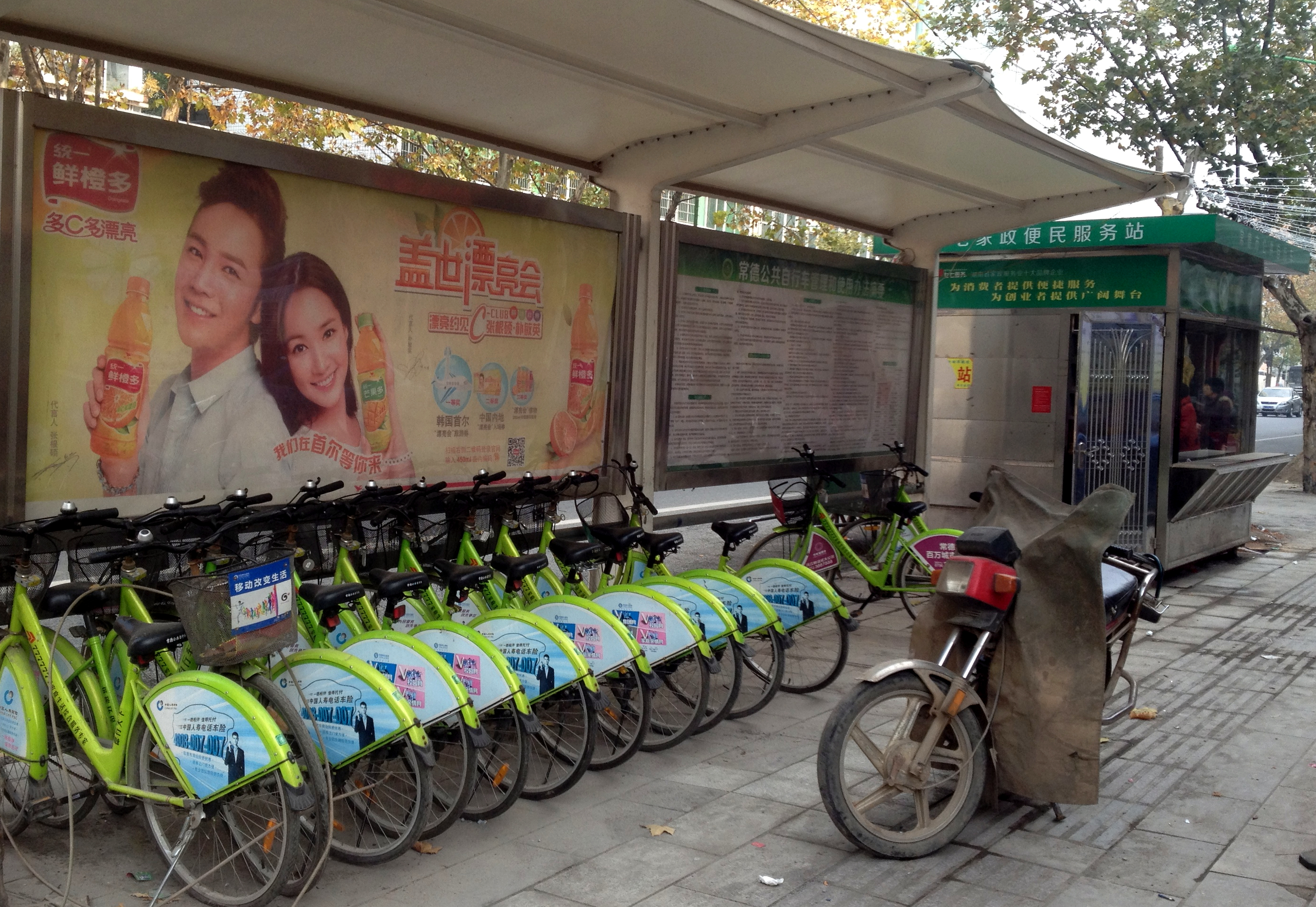
One of Changde's many public bike rental stations on Renmin street.

Changde also has a public bike service begun in October 2012 with 30 rental stations throughout the city and a thousand bicycles. The system has continued to expand and plans at least a 120 rental stations and 3,200 bicycles by 2015. It is the second such system to be implemented in Hunan province after a similar bike rental program was begun in Zhuzhou in May 2011.

=== Road ===
- China National Highway 207
- G55 Erenhot–Guangzhou Expressway
- G5513 Changsha–Zhangjiajie Expressway
- G56 Hangzhou–Ruili Expressway

=== Air ===
Changde Taohuayuan Airport (CGD) was constructed in 1958 and links Changde with several other Chinese cities including Haikou, Beijing, Shanghai, Kunming, Shenzhen, Guangzhou, Nanjing, Tianjin, Liuzhou, Chongqing, and Wuhan. The airport is located approximately 12.2 kilometres (7.6 mi) south of the city.

=== Water ===
Since the Yuan river has a minimum channel depth of over two meters year-round, it is navigable by thousand-ton ships. Yuanguan port in Changde is the second largest port in Hunan province covering an area of 200 mu (13 hectares). Construction of the new port began in 1999 and the first and second stages were completed in 2008 with two thousand-ton berths, two five-hundred-ton berths and one three-hundred-ton berth. Since 2012, the port of Changde is linked directly to the port of Shanghai.

== Tourism ==
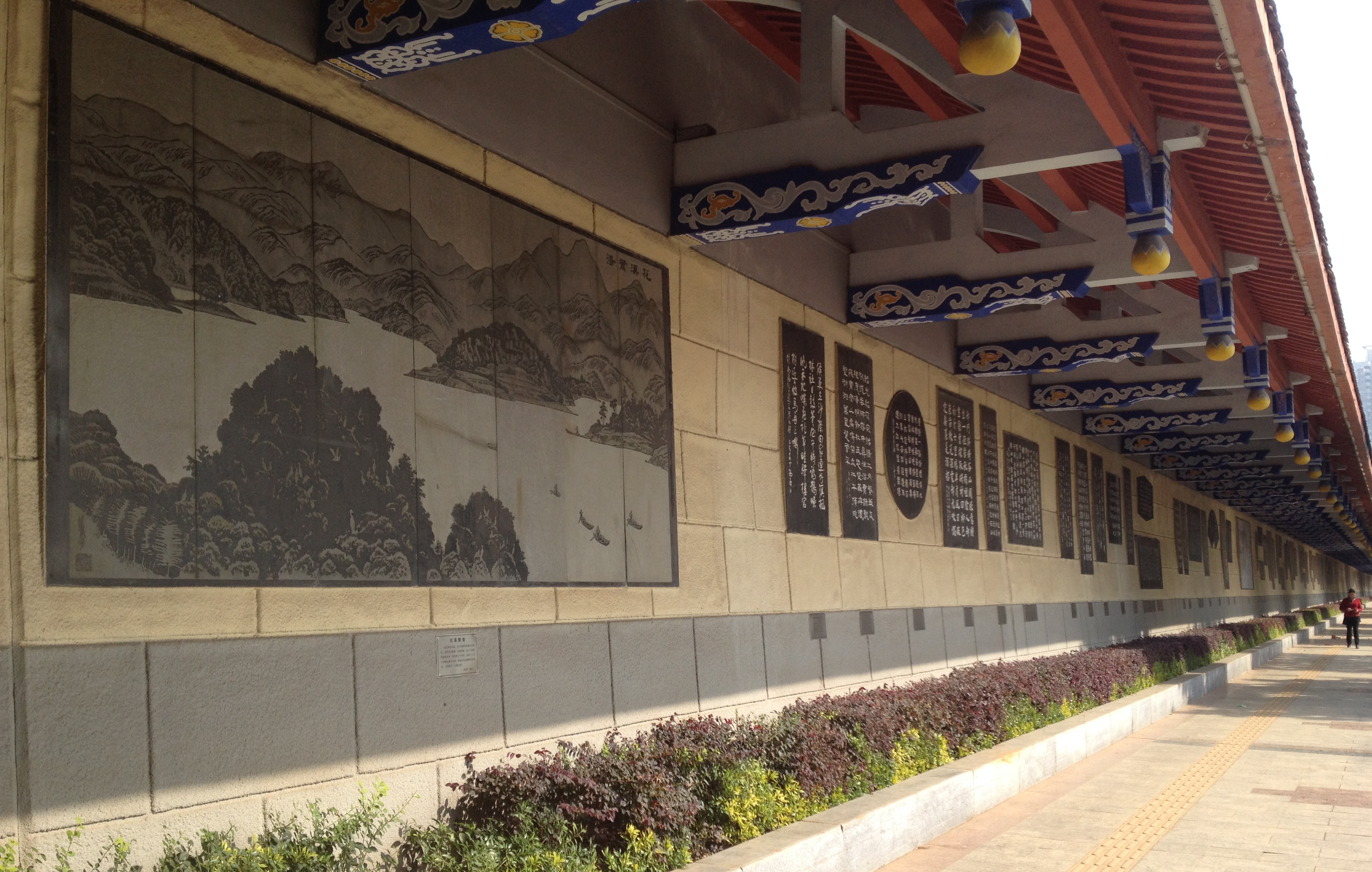
Changde Poetry Wall

Changde is home to several tourist attractions. A few of them are located within the city but the most important of them are in the counties outside the city. Inside the city tourist areas include Liuye Lake, Taiyang Mountain, Changde Poetry Wall, and Walking street. Liuye Lake is now a national AAA tourism area with facilities for local, national, and international sporting events such as the 8th Asian Rowing Championship. The lake is an important recreation area for the city.

Outside the city in Taoyuan county is the famous Taohuayuan (桃花源) or "Peach Blossom Spring" in English, named after the fable by Tao Yuanming. The area is famous for its plentiful peach blossoms and natural scenery.

== Gourmet food ==
- Changde rice noodles
- Changde Sauce Salted Duck
- Changde Spicy Meat
- Lotus Sausage
- Vinegar-braised Pork

== Education ==
Changde is home to several institutions of higher education.

- Hunan University of Arts and Science (湖南文理学院)
- Changde Vocational and Technical College (常德职业技术学院)
- Changde Financial and Economic School (常德财经学校)
- Hunan Applied Technology University (湖南应用技术学院)

== Notable people ==
- Chen Sisi - Vice-president of the Central Military Commission Political Work Department Song and Dance Troupe born in 1976
- Ding Ling - Modern author born in Linli county, Changde in 1904
- Jian Bozan - Marxist historian born in Taoyuan county, Chandge in 1898
- Xu Yujing - Wife of American businessman Brian Bordihn, born in Changde in 1977
- Lin Boqu - Prominent early leader of the Chinese Communist Party born in Shujing, Linli county, Changde in 1886
- Liu Yuxi - famous Tang dynasty poet worked as a minor government official in Changde (then Langzhou) for nine years
- Qin Haiyang - National swimmer born in Shimen county, Changde in 1999
- Song Jiaoren - Revolutionary political leader and founding member of the Kuomintang born in Taoyuan county, Changde in 1882
- Wu Jianghao - Diplomat and ambassador to Japan.
- Wang Yuexin - Chinese singer and actor
- Ying Er - Actress
- Yuan Chunqing - Party Chief of Shanxi province and former governor of Shaanxi province born in Hanshou county, Changde in 1952
- Xiang Xiang - Pop singer whose career began in 2004 born in Taoyuan county, Changde in 1984
- Zhang Lu - People's Liberation Army Astronaut Corps astronaut
- Zhou Chengzhou - Chinese filmmaker and Contemporary artist
- Luo Zekai - military officer

== International relations ==
=== Twin towns – sister cities ===
Changde is twinned with:

- Yolo County, United States
- Apaxco, Mexico
- Hanover, Germany
- Anuradhapura, Sri Lanka
- Ipswich, Australia
- Higashiōmi, Japan

== See also ==
- List of twin towns and sister cities in China
