= Hanchang =

Hanchang may refer to:

Chinese places

- Yueyang, Hunan Province, China - anciently called Hanchang
- Hanchang Town (汉昌镇), a town in Pingjiang County, Hunan province.

Korean place

- Hanchang, Korea
