= Hongqiao Town =

Hongqiao Town may refer to the following locations in China:

- Hongqiao, Hebei, in Yutian County
- Hongqiao, Pingjiang, in Pingjiang County, Hunan province.
- Hongqiao, Minhang District, Shanghai
