= Chang'an (disambiguation) =

Chang'an was the capital of several Chinese dynasties, located on the site of present-day Xi'an, Shaanxi.

Chang'an or Changan may also refer to:

- Air Changan (长安航空), a Chinese airline that has been operating since 1993
- Changan Automobile (长安汽车), a Chinese automobile manufacturer
- Chang'an Avenue (北京市 长安街), a major east–west thoroughfare in Beijing, China
- Chang'an University (长安大学), a university in Xi'an, Shaanxi, China
- Chhagan Bhujbal, a politician from India
- Chang'an (film), a 2023 animated feature film

== Locations in China ==
=== Districts ===
- Chang'an, Shijiazhuang (河北省 石家庄市 长安区), in Hebei
- Chang'an, Xi'an (陕西省 西安市 长安区), in Shaanxi, named after the historical capital

=== Subdistricts ===
- Chang'an Subdistrict, Jiamusi, in Xiangyang District, Jiamusi, Heilongjiang
- Chang'an Subdistrict, Mudanjiang, in Dong'an District, Mudanjiang, Heilongjiang
- Chang'an Subdistrict, Shuangyashan, in Jianshan District, Shuangyashan, Heilongjiang
- Chang'an, Linxiang (长安街道), in Linxiang, Hunan
- Chang'an Subdistrict, Wuxi, in Huishan District, Wuxi, Jiangsu
- Chang'an Subdistrict, Jiaohe, in Jiaohe, Jilin
- Chang'an Subdistrict, Shenyang, in Dadong District, Shenyang, Liaoning
- Chang'an Subdistrict, Xichang, in Xichang, Sichuan

=== Towns ===
- Chang'an, Anhui, in Jixi County, Anhui
- Chang'an, Dongguan, in Dongguan, Guangdong
- Chang'an, Fengkai County, in Fengkai County, Guangdong
- Chang'an, Guangxi, in Rong'an County, Guangxi
- Chang'an Town, Shijiazhuang, in Gaocheng District, Shijiazhuang, Hebei
- Chang'an, Bin County, in Bin County, Heilongjiang
- Chang'an, Fujin, in Fujin City, Heilongjiang
- Chang'an, Tumen, in Tumen, Jilin
- Chang'an, Donggang, in Donggang, Liaoning
- Chang'an, Pingli County, in Pingli County, Shaanxi
- Chang'an, Haining, in Haining City, Zhejiang
- Chang'an, Hangzhou, in Fuyang District, Hangzhou, Zhejiang

=== Townships ===
- Chang'an Township, Gansu, in Ganzhou District, Zhangye, Gansu
- Chang'an Township, Guizhou, in Huishui County, Guizhou
- Chang'an Township, Hunan, in Hengyang County, Hunan
- Chang'an Township, Shanxi, in Gujiao, Shanxi
- Chang'an Township, Linshui County, in Linshui County, Sichuan
- Chang'an Township, Luzhou, in Longmatan District, Luzhou, Sichuan
- Chang'an Township, Yunnan, in Weixin County, Yunnan

== See also ==
- Xi'an, the present-day name of the city of Chang'an
