= Quyuan =

Quyuan may refer to:

- Quyuan Management District (Chinese: 屈原管理区), formerly the State-run Farm of Quyuan (Chinese: 屈原农场), is a district in Miluo City, Hunan province, China.
- Quyuan Town, a town in Zigui County, Hubei, China
- Qu Yuan (c. 340–278 BC), poet and official during the Warring States period
- Yu Yue (1821–1907), also known as Mr. Quyuan, Qing dynasty scholar, philologist and official
