= Wulipai =

Wulipai may refer to:

== Subdistricts ==
- Wulipai, Changsha (五里牌街道), a subdistrict in Furong District, Changsha, Hunan province
- Wulipai, Yueyang (五里牌街道), a subdistrict in Yueyanglou District, Yueyang, Hunan province
- Wulipai, Leiyang (五里牌街道), a subdistrict of Leiyang City, Hunan
- Wulipai, Linxiang (五里牌街道), a subdistrict in Linxiang, Hunan

== Towns ==
- Wulipai, Chenzhou (五里牌镇), a town of Suxian District, Chenzhou, Hunan
