= Yueyanglou =

Yueyanglou may refer to:

- Yueyang Lou, or Yueyang Tower, an ancient Chinese tower in Yueyang, Hunan, China.
- Yueyanglou District, a district in Yueyang, Hunan.
- Yueyanglou Subdistrict, a subdistrict of Yueyanglou District, Yueyang.
