= Yunxi =

Yunxi may refer to one of these places in China:

- Yunxi County (郧西县), Shiyan, Hubei
- Yunxi District (云溪区), a district of Yueyang City in Hunan Province
- Yunxi Subdistrict (云溪街道), a subdistrict of Yunxi District in Yueyang City, Hunan Province
- Yunxi Subdistrict, Jiaozhou (云溪街道), a subdistrict of Jiaozhou City, Shandong
