= Zhangguying Village =

Zhanguying Village 张谷英村
- Village
- Location in Hunan
- Coordinates: 29°00′37″N 113°29′26″E
- Country: People's Republic of China
- Province: Hunan
- County: Yueyang County
- Town: Zhangguying
- Time zone: UTC+8 (China Standard)

Zhangguying Village (simplified Chinese: 张谷英村; traditional Chinese: 張谷英村; pinyin: zhāng-gǔ-yīng cūn) is an ancient village. Located in Zhangguying Town, Yueyang County, Hunan Province, the village is named after the forefather Zhang Guying. It is famous for its ancient building complex (古建筑群) in the Ming and Qing dynasties. As vernacular residence in scale in the South Central China, the ancient building complex is the best preserved in China. Constructed broadly in scale and decorated splendidly, it covers more than 50,000 m^{2} (540,000 sq ft) with 1,732 rooms. The complex has been placed on the list of Major Historical and Cultural Site Protected at the National Level on June 25, 2001. The village was also included on the first batch list of National Famous Historical and Cultural Villages on October 8, 2003, and became one of AAAA-rated tourist attractions on December 18, 2014.
