= Rongjiawan train disaster =

Fatal train collision that occurred in China

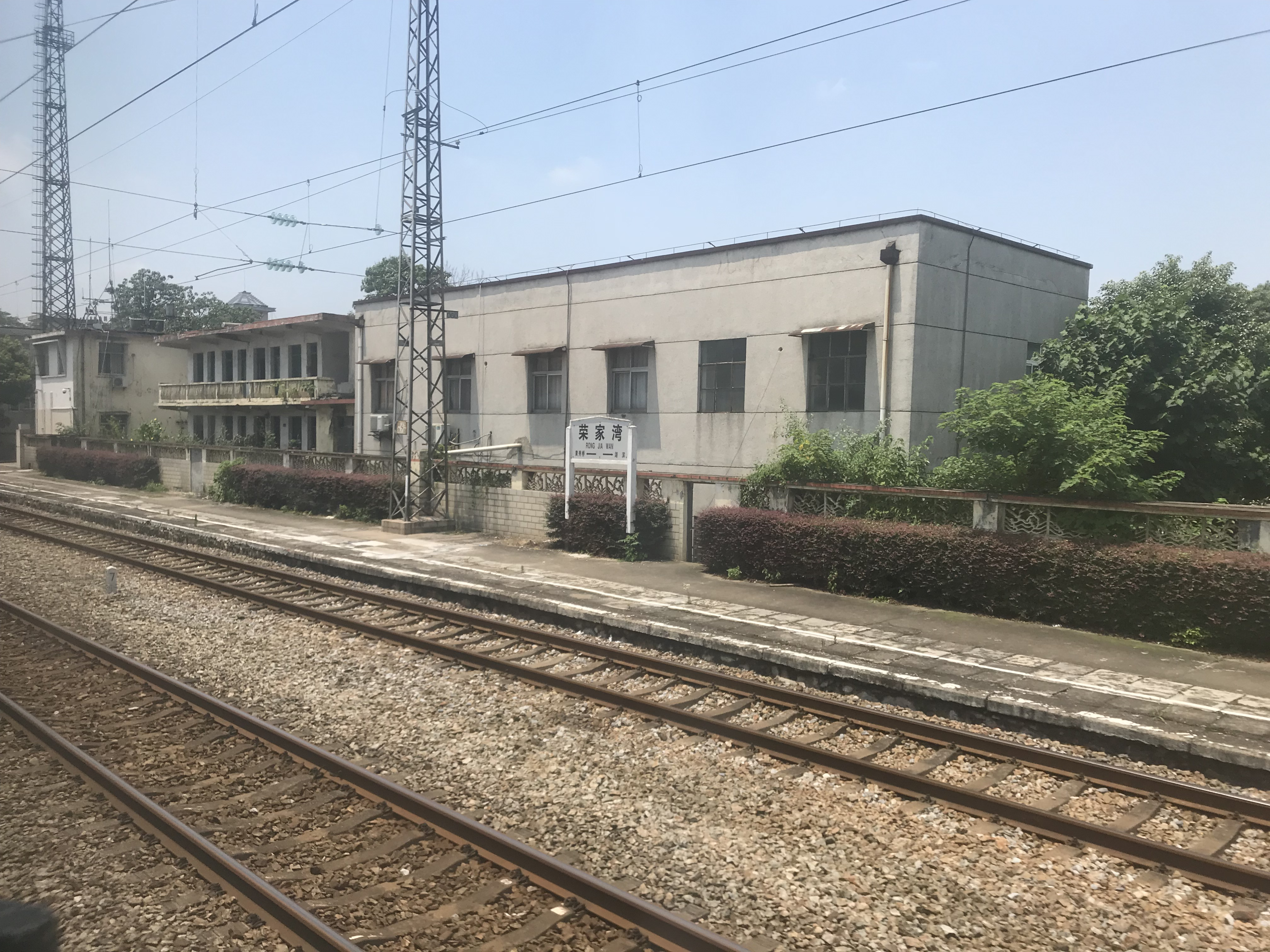
- Rongjiawan Station, site of the accident

Details
- Date: April 29, 1997; 10:48 a.m.
- Location: Rongjiawan, Hunan, China
- Coordinates: 29°08′52″N 113°07′10″E
- Line: Beijing–Guangzhou railway
- Incident type: Rear-end Collision
- Cause: Human error; signalman failure to change light

Statistics
- Trains: 2
- Deaths: 90-126
- Injured: 48 (serious); 182 (minor)

The Rongjiawan train disaster occurred on April 29, 1997 in Rongjiawan, Hunan, China.

== Accident ==
On April 29, 1997, passenger train #818 was halted at track 4 of Rongjiawan Railway Station. The 818 was headed towards a station in Chaling County. The other train involved, another passenger train identified as #324, was on its way to Zhengzhou when it also arrived at Rongjiawan Station.

Number 324 entered the station approach tracks with a green signal, but was set to enter track 4. The engineer immediately activated the emergency brakes when they saw train #818 blocking the tracks ahead, but train #324 was too close to stop in the remaining space. Number 324 then rear-ended #818. Around 3,000 passengers were involved in the collision.

== Response ==
Following the accident, between 1,000 and 2,000 police and rescue officers arrived at the scene of the accident and began the process of rescuing survivors and extracting bodies.

== Aftermath ==
The death toll of the accident was listed as being at least 90. The cause of the accident was established as error on the behalf of the signalman.
