= Liulinzhou =

Subdistrict in Junshan District, Hunan, China

Coordinates: 29°27′N 113°01′E

Liulinzhou (Chinese: 柳林洲街道; pinyin: Liǔlínzhōu Jiēdào) is a subdistrict and the seat of Junshan District in Yueyang Prefecture-level City, Hunan, China. The subdistrict was reorganized through the amalgamation of Xicheng Subdistrict (Chinese: 西城街道) and the former Liulinzhou Town (Chinese: 柳林洲镇) on November 20. It has an area of about 214.7 km^{2} (82.9 sq mi) with a population of 71,100 (as of 2015).

== See also ==
- List of township-level divisions of Hunan
