= Guiyi =

Town in Miluo City, China

Guiyi 归义镇
- Town
- Location of the seat in Hunan
- Coordinates: 28°48′25″N 113°04′27″E
- Country: People's Republic of China
- Province: Hunan
- Prefecture-level city: Yueyang
- County-level city: Miluo City
- Village-level divisions: 2 villages; 16 communities

Guiyi (Chinese: 归义镇; pinyin: Guīyì Zhèn) (Kweiyi) is a town and the seat of Miluo City in Hunan, China. The town was reformed through the amalgamation of Chengjiao Township (Chinese: 城郊乡) and Chengguan Town (Chinese: 城关镇) on December 3, 2015. It is located in the central Miluo City, it is bordered by Quzici Town (Chinese: 屈子祠镇) and Luojiang Town (Chinese: 罗江镇) to the north and northeast, Xinshi Town (Chinese: 新市镇) to the southeast, Gupei Town (Chinese: 古培镇) to the southwest, Miluo Town (Chinese: 汨罗镇) and Heshi Town (Chinese: 河市镇) to the northwest. The town has an area of 35 km^{2} (14 sq mi) with a population of 89,000 (as of 2015). Through the amalgamation of village-level divisions in 2016, the town has 2 villages and 16 communities. Its seat is Mixin Community (Chinese: 汨新社区).

== Administrative divisions ==
Administrative divisions of Guiyi Town (2016–present)
villages or communities and its basic conditions					former township-level		notes
English	Chinese	residential groups	families	population	English	Chinese	notes
Guiyi Town	归义镇	306	39,336	126,558			
Chezhan Community	车站社区	23	2,980	9,676	Chengjiao Township	城郊乡	
Dalupu Community	大路铺社区	14	1,352	4,389	Chengjiao Township	城郊乡	
Gaoquan Community	高泉社区	12	2,015	7,840	CHengguan Town	城关镇	
Gaotang Community	高塘社区	7	4,160	13,322	CHengguan Town	城关镇	
Guangchang Community	广场社区	12	2,412	8,344	CHengguan Town	城关镇	
Guiyi Community	归义社区	8	1,618	5,632	CHengguan Town	城关镇	
Laojie Community	老街社区	10	2,512	8,498	CHengguan Town	城关镇	
Longzhou Community	龙舟社区	13	2,824	6,158	Chengjiao Township	城郊乡	
Luocheng Community	罗城社区	24	3,266	9,967	Chengjiao Township	城郊乡	
Mixin Community	汨新社区	12	2,285	8,920	Chengjiao Township	城郊乡	
Nanjiang Community	南江社区	10	2,415	6,835	Chengjiao Township	城郊乡	
Rongjiaping Community	荣家坪社区	43	3,604	8,558	Chengjiao Township	城郊乡	reformed by merging Shungtuo Village and the former Rongjiaping Community in 2016. 2016年由原荣家坪社区、双托村合并设
Shantang Community	山塘社区	16	2,069	6,627	CHengguan Town	城关镇	
Shuangtang Community	双塘社区	20	606	2,285	Chengjiao Township	城郊乡	
Yaozhou Community	窑洲社区	19	546	2,523	Chengjiao Township	城郊乡	
Youyihe Community	友谊河社区	10	2,900	9,206	CHengguan Town	城关镇	
Baizhang Village	百丈村	26	916	3,980	Chengjiao Township	城郊乡	reformed by merging Baizhang and Chengbei villages in 2016. 2016年由原百丈村、城北村合并设
Shangma Village	上马村	27	856	3,798	Chengjiao Township	城郊乡	

== See also ==
- List of township-level divisions of Hunan
