= Quyuan Management District =

Quyuan 屈原管理区
- Management district
- Location of the seat in Hunan
- Coordinates: 28°51′37″N 112°55′00″E
- Country: People's Republic of China
- Province: Hunan
- Prefecture-level city: Yueyang
- Time zone: UTC+8 (China Standard)

Quyuan Management District (Chinese: 屈原管理区; pinyin: Qūyuán Guǎnlǐqū) is a district in Yueyang, in the northeast of Hunan province, China, situated on the east (right) bank of the Xiang River. It was reorganized from the former State-run Farm of Quyuan (simplified Chinese: 屈原农场; traditional Chinese: 屈原農場) in 2000. The district is a part of Miluo City and exercises its jurisdiction over a subdistrict, a township and 2 towns in Miluo City; however, it is directly under the administration of Yueyang prefecture-level city.

== See also ==
- List of township-level divisions of Hunan
