= Dongting Lake Bridge =

Bridge over Dongting Lake in Yenyang, China

Dongting Lake Bridge 洞庭湖大桥
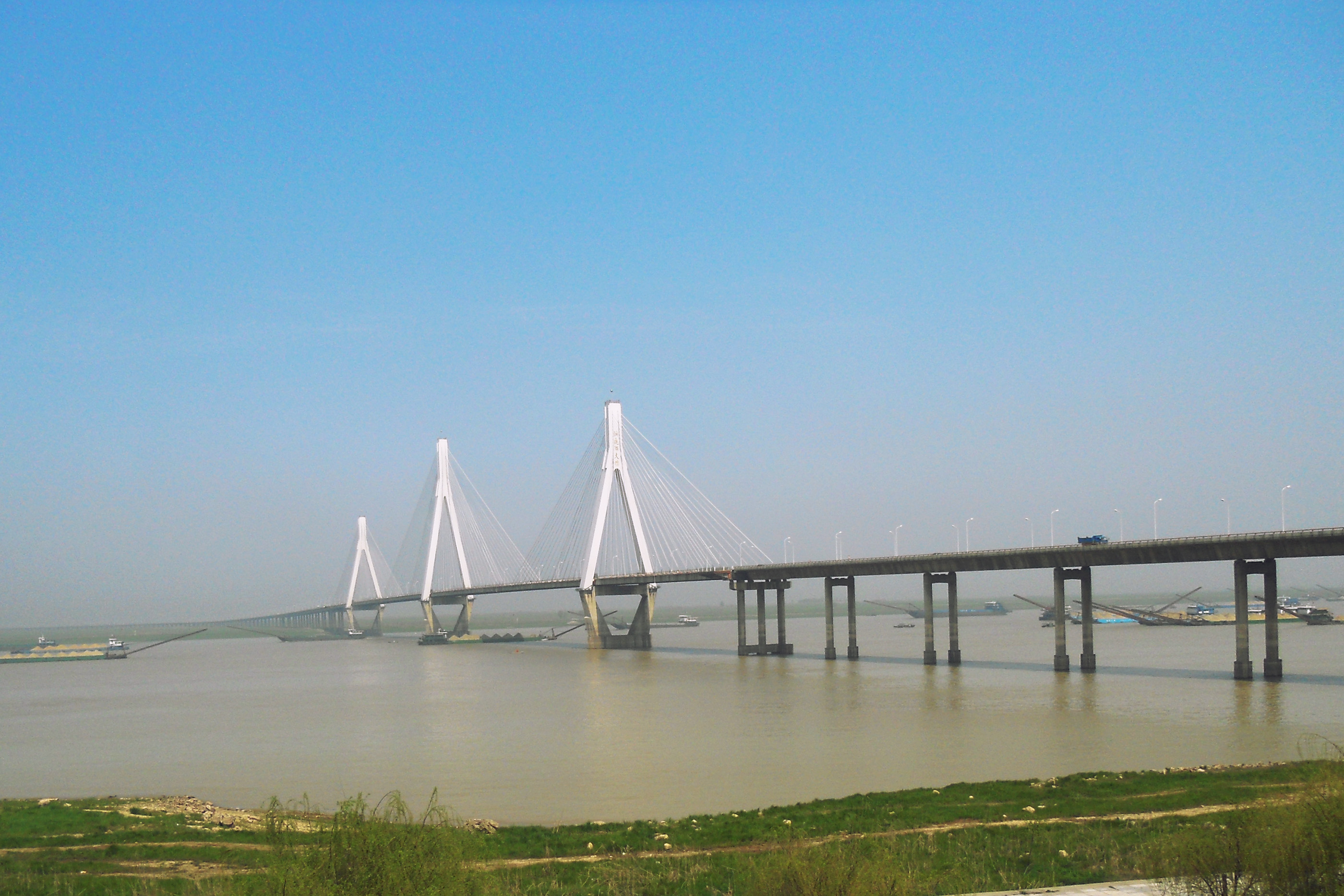
- Coordinates: 29.406086°N 113.097414°E
- Crosses: Dongting Lake
- Locale: Yueyang, Hunan, China

Characteristics
- Design: Cable-stayed
- Longest span: 310 m (1,017 ft)

History
- Construction end: 2002

Location
- Interactive map of Dongting Lake Bridge

The Dongting Lake Bridge (Chinese: 洞庭湖大桥) is a bridge with a cable-stayed bridge section over Dongting Lake in Yueyang, northeastern Hunan Province, China. The cable-stayed section consists of three towers supporting center spans of 310m each, with two identical side spans of 130m each.

The bridge is one of a handful of "next generation" bridges worldwide, and includes cable dampers that use magnetorheological fluid which have the capability to change viscosity in response to an electromagnetic field. The bridge includes four lanes of traffic—two lanes in each direction.

== Description ==
The Dongting Lake Bridge is connected to Dongting Avenue, China National Highway 107 and Jingzhu Expressway in the east, and the Provincial Highway Route 1804 of Hunan in the west. The total length of the bridge and adjacent road is 18,868.82 meters, of which the bridge's length is 5,788.2 meters. The length of the bridge's cabling is 4,426 meters. Total investment in the construction of the Dongting Lake Bridge is 805 million yuan. As of November 30, 2018, it is the longest inland river bridge in China, and the bridge spans the East Dongting Lake area.

== History ==
Construction of the Dongting Lake Bridge was officially started on December 19, 1996. On December 26, 2000, the bridge was completed and opened to traffic.
