= Wulipai, Yueyang =

Coordinates: 29°22′2″N 113°7′15″E

Wulipai Subdistrict (Chinese: 五里牌街道; pinyin: Wǔlǐpái Jiēdào) is a subdistrict and the seat of Yueyanglou District in Yueyang Prefecture-level City, Hunan, China. It was originally a subdistrict in South District of Yueyang and formed in 1984. On March 16, 1996, the South District ceased as a district, it was merged to the newly established Yueyanglou District. The subdistrict has an area of about 7 km^{2} (2.7 sq mi) with a population of 66,043 (as of 2010 census). The subdistrict has nine communities under its jurisdiction. Its seat is Wulipai Community (Chinese: 五里牌社区).

The Xincheng Community in the Wulipai Subdistrict of the Yueyang Tower District is located on Jianxiang Road near Yueyang Tower, covering an area of 0.7 square kilometers. It has a resident population of 3,293 people and a floating population of 1,627 people. The community currently has 17 staff members and has established three party branches under its community party branch, with a total of 275 party members. The community is divided into eight grids and includes two residential complexes, making it a comprehensive urban community that integrates living, commerce, and leisure.

== Administrative divisions ==
Communities of Wulipai Subdistrict (2016–present)
communities		communities	
English	Chinese	English	Chinese
Gaoshanpo Community	高山坡社区	Wulipai Community	五里牌社区
Gujing Community	古井社区	Xincheng Community	新城社区
Huabanqiao Community	花板桥社区	Yangshutang Community	杨树塘社区
Shejialong Community	佘家垅社区	Yuntongjie Community	运通街社区
Sihuajian Community	四化建社区		
