= Yunxi Subdistrict =

Subdistrict in Yueyang, China

Coordinates: 29°28′35″N 113°16′20″E

Yunxi Subdistrict (Chinese: 云溪街道; pinyin: Yúnxī Jiēdào) is a subdistrict and the seat of Yunxi District in Yueyang Prefecture-level City, Hunan, China. It was reformed as a town through the amalgamation of Chengjiao Township (Chinese: 永济乡), Yunxi Town (Chinese: 云溪乡) and the former Yunxi Town (Chinese: 云溪镇) on November 30, 2015 and reorganized as a subdistrict in 2017. The subdistrict has an area of 176.8 km^{2} (68.3 sq mi) with a population of 103,700 (as of 2017). Through the amalgamation of village-level divisions in 2016, the town has 13 villages and 13 communities. Its seat is Fengtaishan Community (Chinese: 凤台山社区).

== Subdivisions ==
Administrative divisions of Yunxi Subdistrict (2017 - present)
13 communities		13 villages	
English	Chinese	English	Chinese
Anjuyuan Community	安居园社区	Bayi Village	八一村
Fengtaishan Community	凤台山社区	Binhu Village	滨湖村
Jiangjialing Community	汪家岭社区	Dongfeng Village	东风村
Jinpen Community	金盆社区	Jianjun Village	建军村
Leigutai Community	擂鼓台社区	Jianshe Village	建设村
Lingbohu Community	凌泊湖社区	Pingtian Village	坪田村
Maolingtou Community	茅岭头社区	Qingshi Village	青石村
Qingpo Community	青坡社区	Qingxi Village	清溪村
Shengligou Community	胜利沟社区	Shuanghua Village	双花村
Ximatang Community	洗马塘社区	Taoli Village	桃李村
Yangshuxiang Community	杨树港社区	Tuanjie Village	团结村
Zhenlongtai Community	镇龙台社区	Xinpu Village	新铺村
Zhumuqiao Community	槠木桥社区	Youhao Village	友好村
