= Chang'an, Linxiang =

Place in Hunan, China

Coordinates: 29°28′38″N 113°27′26″E

Chang'an Subdistrict (Chinese: 长安街道; pinyin: Cháng'ān Jiēdào) is a subdistrict and the seat of Linxiang City in Hunan, China. The subdistrict was reformed through the amalgamation of Baiyun Town (Chinese: 白云镇), Chengnan Township (Chinese: 城南乡) and the former Chang'an Subdistrict on November 24, 2015. It is located in the west central Linxiang City, it is bordered by Wulipai Subdistrict (Chinese: 五里牌街道) to the east, Zhongfang Town (Chinese: 忠防镇) and Taolin Town (Chinese: 桃林镇) to the south, and Yunxi District to the west and north. The subdistrict has an area of 104.3 km^{2} (40.3 sq mi) with a population of 81,200 (as of 2015). Through the amalgamation of village-level divisions in 2016, the town has 6 villages and 6 communities under its jurisdiction. Its seat is Matangpu Community (Chinese: 麻塘铺社区).
