= Yanglinjie =

Town in Hunan, China

Yanglinjie 杨林街镇
- Town
- Location in Hunan
- Coordinates: 29°6′24″N 113°23′20″E
- Country: People's Republic of China
- Province: Hunan
- County: Yueyang County
- Time zone: UTC+8 (China Standard)

Yanglinjie (Chinese: 杨林街镇; pinyin: Yánglínjiē Zhèn) is a town of Yueyang County in Hunan, China. It was reorganized as a town from the former township of Yanglin (Chinese: 杨林乡) on November 17, 2017. The town has an area of 85.96 km^{2} (33.19 sq mi) with a population of 35,800 (as of 2017). Through the amalgamation of villages in 2016, its divisions were reduced to eight villages from 25 villages. Its seat is at Chengshanzhou (Chinese: 城山舟).

== History ==
The township of Yanglin existed in the late period of Mingguo (1940s), it was a part of Tieshan Township (Chinese: 铁山乡) in 1949 and of Tieshan Commune (Chinese: 铁山公社) in 1958. It was incorporated as a commune from part of Tieshan in 1961. The commune was reorganized as a township in 1984.

In 1995, Lantian Township (Chinese: 兰田乡) was merged to it, the township of Yanglin had an area of 86 km^{2} (33 sq mi) with a population of 31,000 (as of 1995), it had 25 villages, its villages of 25 were amalgamated to eight in 2016. Yanglin Township was reorganized as the town of Yanglinjie on November 17, 2017.

== Subdivisions ==
Subdivisions of Yanglinjie Town (2016–present)
villages		former villages	
English	Chinese	English	Chinese
Chengshanzhou	城山舟	Chengshan	城山
Chengshanzhou	城山舟	Heping	和平
Chengshanzhou	城山舟	Litang	立塘
Guqiao	姑桥	Guqiao	姑桥
Guqiao	姑桥	Mabang	马塝
Guqiao	姑桥	Qintian	琴田
Huaguoyuan	花果园	Shentang	沈塘
Huaguoyuan	花果园	Silong	四龙
Lanze	兰泽	Baishui	白水
Lanze	兰泽	Fuchong	福冲
Lanze	兰泽	Lanze	兰泽
Shangshu	尚书	Hongyang	红阳
Shangshu	尚书	Shapo	沙陂
Shangshu	尚书	Zhangping	张坪
Wang'an	王安	Juyun	聚云
Wang'an	王安	Lantian	兰田
Wang'an	王安	Luchu	鲁楚
Wang'an	王安	Wang'an	王安
Xiyuan	溪源	Bengshan	崩山
Xiyuan	溪源	Gutai	谷太
Xiyuan	溪源	Xiyuan	西源
Yanglinjie	杨林街	Baini	白泥
Yanglinjie	杨林街	Fuchao	付朝
Yanglinjie	杨林街	Longtan	龙潭
Yanglinjie	杨林街	Yanglin	杨林
