= Rongjiawan =

Town in Yueyang, Hunan, China

Rongjiawan 荣家湾镇
- Town
- Location in Hunan
- Coordinates: 29°8′27″N 113°6′31″E
- Country: People's Republic of China
- Province: Hunan
- County: Yueyang County
- Time zone: UTC+8 (China Standard)

Rongjiawan (Chinese: 荣家湾镇; pinyin: Róngjiāwān Zhèn) is a town and the county seat of Yueyang in Hunan, China. The town was reformed through the amalgamation of Chengguan Town (Chinese: 城关镇; known as Rongjiawan), Lujiao Town (Chinese: 鹿角镇) and Matang Town (Chinese: 麻塘镇) on November 30, 2015. The town has an area of 217.42 km^{2} (83.95 sq mi) with a population of 161,100 (as of 2015). Through the amalgamation of villages in 2016, it has 19 villages and 24 communities under its jurisdiction, its seat is at Chezhan Rd. (Chinese: 车站路).

== Geography ==
Rongjiawan is located in the northwestern Yueyang County, on the eastern bank of Dongting Lake, the Xiang River flows through the south western margin of the town. It is bordered by Zhongzhou Township (Chinese: 中洲乡) to the southwest and northwest, Yueyanglou District to the northeast, Xinkai Town (Chinese: 新开镇) to the east, and Xinqiang (Chinese: 新墙镇) and Huangshajie (Chinese: 黄沙街镇) towns to the southeast and south.

== Amalgamation of villages in 2016 ==
Amalgamation of villages in 2016
villages or communities		former jurisdiction of towns and townships in 2015			
villages or communities		former names of villages or communities		former townships or towns	
English	Chinese	English	Chinese	English	Chinese
Banhuxincun Village	畔湖新村	Chunfeng Village	春风村	Matang Town	麻塘镇
Banhuxincun Village	畔湖新村	Huban Village	畔湖村	Matang Town	麻塘镇
Chengdong Village	城东村	Xusheng Village	许胜村	Rongjiawan Town	荣家湾镇
Chengdong Village	城东村	Qunxing Village	群星村	Rongjiawan Town	荣家湾镇
Chengdong Village	城东村	Yuedong Village	月东村	Rongjiawan Town	荣家湾镇
Chengdong Village	城东村	Taichong Village	大冲村	Rongjiawan Town	荣家湾镇
Dongfang Village	东方村	Xinjian Village	新建村	Rongjiawan Town	荣家湾镇
Dongfang Village	东方村	Nongke Village	农科村	Rongjiawan Town	荣家湾镇
Dongfang Village	东方村	Dongfang Village	东方村	Rongjiawan Town	荣家湾镇
Dongfeng Village	东风村	Bajing Village	八景村	Matang Town	麻塘镇
Dongfeng Village	东风村	Dongfeng Village	东风村	Matang Town	麻塘镇
Dongfeng Village	东风村	Hengtang Village	横塘村	Matang Town	麻塘镇
Dongfeng Village	东风村	Tangnei Village	塘内村	Matang Town	麻塘镇
Dongfeng Village	东风村	Xielong Village	谢垅村	Matang Town	麻塘镇
Dongting Village	洞庭村	Beihu Village	北湖村	Matang Town	麻塘镇
Dongting Village	洞庭村	Hexing Village	和兴村	Matang Town	麻塘镇
Dongting Village	洞庭村	Dongting Village	洞庭村	Matang Town	麻塘镇
Gongcheng Village	公诚村	Fuqiang Village	富强村	Matang Town	麻塘镇
Gongcheng Village	公诚村	Sanyi Village	三义村	Matang Town	麻塘镇
Gongcheng Village	公诚村	Jinxing Village	金星村	Matang Town	麻塘镇
Jinlong Village	金垅村	Jinshan Village	金山村	Matang Town	麻塘镇
Jinlong Village	金垅村	Yinglong Village	应垅村	Matang Town	麻塘镇
Jinlong Village	金垅村	Wanlong Village	万垅村	Matang Town	麻塘镇
Liuheyuan Village	六合垸村	Yanhe Village	沿河村	Rongjiawan Town	荣家湾镇
Liuheyuan Village	六合垸村	Liuhe Village	六合村	Rongjiawan Town	荣家湾镇
Lujiao Village	鹿角村	Yangmao Village	杨茂村	Lujiao Town	鹿角镇
Lujiao Village	鹿角村	Jimei Village	济美村	Lujiao Town	鹿角镇
Lujiao Village	鹿角村	Lujiao Village	鹿角村	Lujiao Town	鹿角镇
Lujiao Village	鹿角村	Nongke Village	农科村	Lujiao Town	鹿角镇
Mabushan Village	麻布山村	Yongshui Village	永和村	Lujiao Town	鹿角镇
Mabushan Village	麻布山村	Da'ao Village	大坳村	Lujiao Town	鹿角镇
Mabushan Village	麻布山村	Paitou Village	牌头村	Lujiao Town	鹿角镇
Matang Village	麻塘村	Matang Village	麻塘村	Lujiao Town	鹿角镇
Matang Village	麻塘村	Datang Village	大塘村	Lujiao Town	鹿角镇
Matang Village	麻塘村	Xinjian Village	新建村	Lujiao Town	鹿角镇
Niugao Village	牛皋村	Jianxin Village	建新村	Lujiao Town	鹿角镇
Niugao Village	牛皋村	Niugao Village	牛皋村	Lujiao Town	鹿角镇
Niugao Village	牛皋村	Shouqiao Village	寿桥村	Lujiao Town	鹿角镇
Niugao Village	牛皋村	Xingfu Village	幸福村	Lujiao Town	鹿角镇
Rongluxincun Village	荣鹿新村	Huaqun Village	华群村	Lujiao Town	鹿角镇
Rongluxincun Village	荣鹿新村	Kuihua Village	葵花村	Lujiao Town	鹿角镇
Rongluxincun Village	荣鹿新村	Xinghuo Village	星火村	Lujiao Town	鹿角镇
Rongwanhu Village	荣湾湖村	Dacheng Village	大成村	Lujiao Town	鹿角镇
Rongwanhu Village	荣湾湖村	Gaofeng Village	高峰村	Lujiao Town	鹿角镇
Rongwanhu Village	荣湾湖村	Sunwu Village	孙午村	Rongjiawan Town	荣家湾镇
Rongwanhu Village	荣湾湖村	Xingwu Village	兴无村	Lujiao Town	鹿角镇
Wenfa Village	文发村	Qinglian Village	青莲村	Lujiao Town	鹿角镇
Wenfa Village	文发村	Santang Village	三塘村	Lujiao Town	鹿角镇
Wenfa Village	文发村	Wenfa Village	文发村	Lujiao Town	鹿角镇
Wenfa Village	文发村	Wu'ai Village	五爱村	Lujiao Town	鹿角镇
Xingyuan Village	兴园村	Lantang Village	兰塘村	Rongjiawan Town	荣家湾镇
Xingyuan Village	兴园村	Zhushu Village	株树村	Rongjiawan Town	荣家湾镇
Xingyuan Village	兴园村	Yuejin Village	跃进村	Rongjiawan Town	荣家湾镇
Xinrong Village	欣荣村	Dongzhuang Village	东庄村	Lujiao Town	鹿角镇
Xinrong Village	欣荣村	Xianfeng Village	先锋村	Lujiao Town	鹿角镇
Xinrong Village	欣荣村	Zhongxin Village	忠信村	Lujiao Town	鹿角镇
You'ai Village	友爱村	Qunhe Village	群合村	Lujiao Town	鹿角镇
You'ai Village	友爱村	Qunli Village	群力村	Rongjiawan Town	荣家湾镇
You'ai Village	友爱村	You'ai Village	友爱村	Rongjiawan Town	荣家湾镇
You'ai Village	友爱村	Zhouxie Village	周谢村	Lujiao Town	鹿角镇
Yuewu Village	岳武村	Binhu Village	滨湖村	Lujiao Town	鹿角镇
Yuewu Village	岳武村	Datong Village	大同村	Lujiao Town	鹿角镇
Yuewu Village	岳武村	Gongtong Village	共同村	Lujiao Town	鹿角镇
Yuewu Village	岳武村	Yuewu Village	岳武村	Lujiao Town	鹿角镇
