= Zhangguying =

Town in Hunan, China

Zhangguying Town 张谷英镇
- Town
- Location in Hunan
- Coordinates: 29°00′34″N 113°29′32″E
- Country: People's Republic of China
- Province: Hunan
- County: Yueyang County
- Time zone: UTC+8 (China Standard)

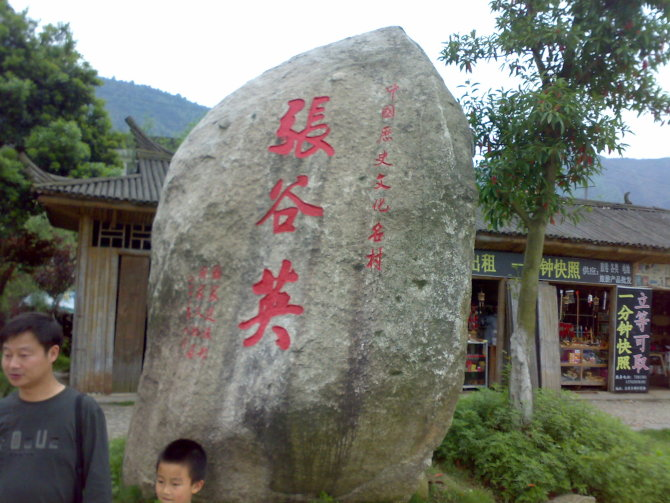
The lettering stone of Zhangguying Town, Engraved with "Zhangguying Town"(張谷英).

Zhangguying Town (simplified Chinese: 张谷英镇; traditional Chinese: 張谷英鎮; pinyin: Zhānggǔyīng Zhèn) is a town of Yueyang County, Hunan Province, China. It was reformed on November 30, 2015. The town has an area of 177.36 kilometres (110.21 mi). As of 2015, it has a census registered population of 46,200. Zhangguying Town is divided into 13 villages and a community under its jurisdiction, the seat of town is Weidong Community (渭洞社区). The town is named after the Major National Historical and Cultural Site of Zhangguying Village.
