= Hongqiao, Pingjiang =

Hongqiao 虹桥镇
- Town
- Location in Hunan
- Coordinates: 28°55′44″N 113°53′02″E
- Country: People's Republic of China
- Province: Hunan
- Prefecture-level city: Yueyang
- County: Pingjiang
- Village-level divisions: 1 residential community 34 villages
- Elevation: 227 m (745 ft)
- Time zone: UTC+8 (China Standard)
- Area code: 0730

Hongqiao (simplified Chinese: 虹桥; traditional Chinese: 虹橋; pinyin: Hóngqiáo; lit. 'rainbow bridge') is a town in the northeast of Pingjiang County in the Tianjing Mountains (天井山) of northeastern Hunan province, China, situated near the border with Jiangxi. It is 37 kilometres (23 mi) from the county seat and 87 kilometres (54 mi) southeast of downtown Yueyang. As of 2011, it has one residential community (居委会) and 34 villages under its administration.

== See also ==
- List of township-level divisions of Hunan
