= Yueyang County =

County in Hunan, China

Yueyang County 岳阳县
- County
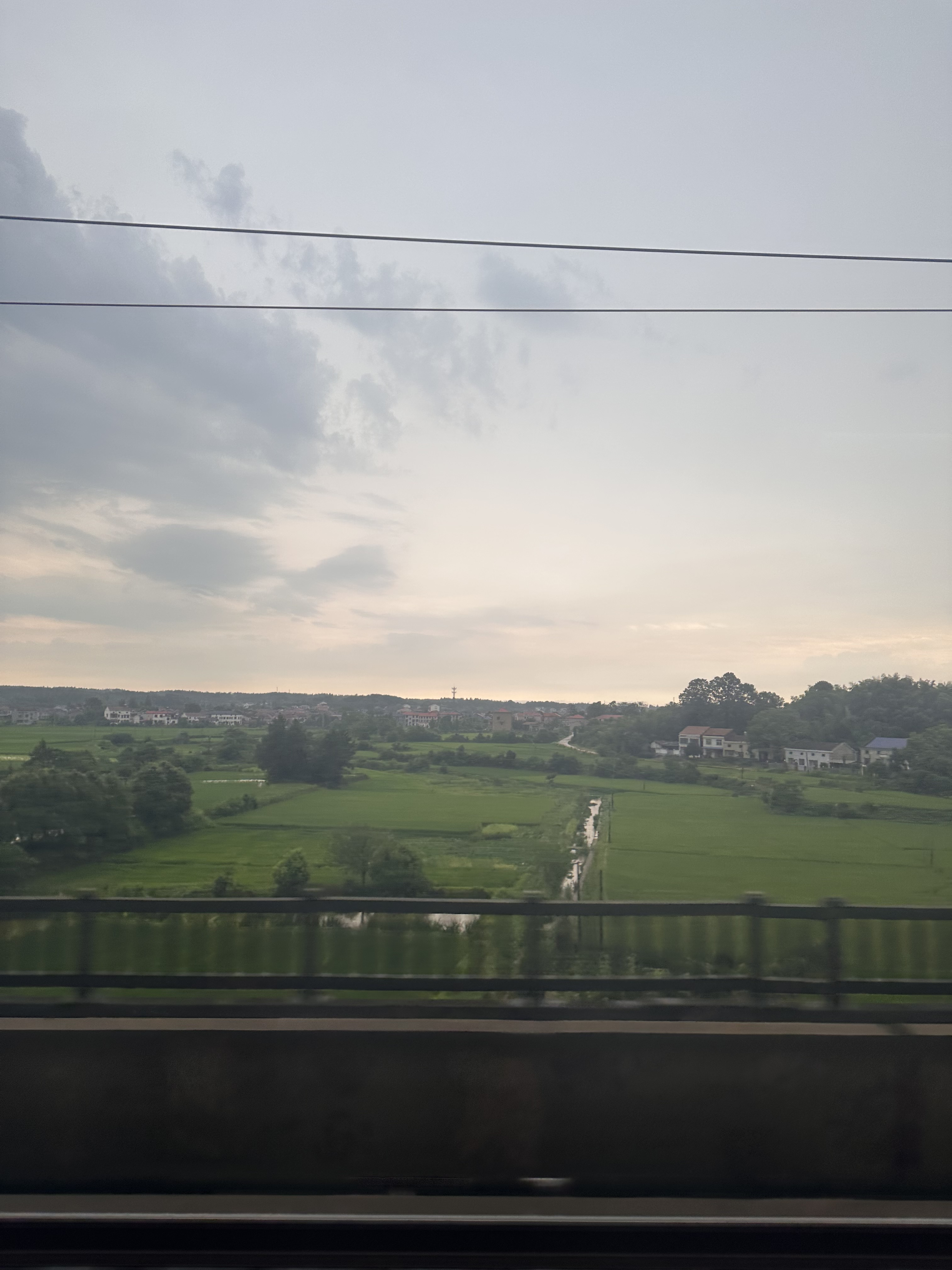
- Rural Yueyang County, Yueyang Hunan, in July 2023

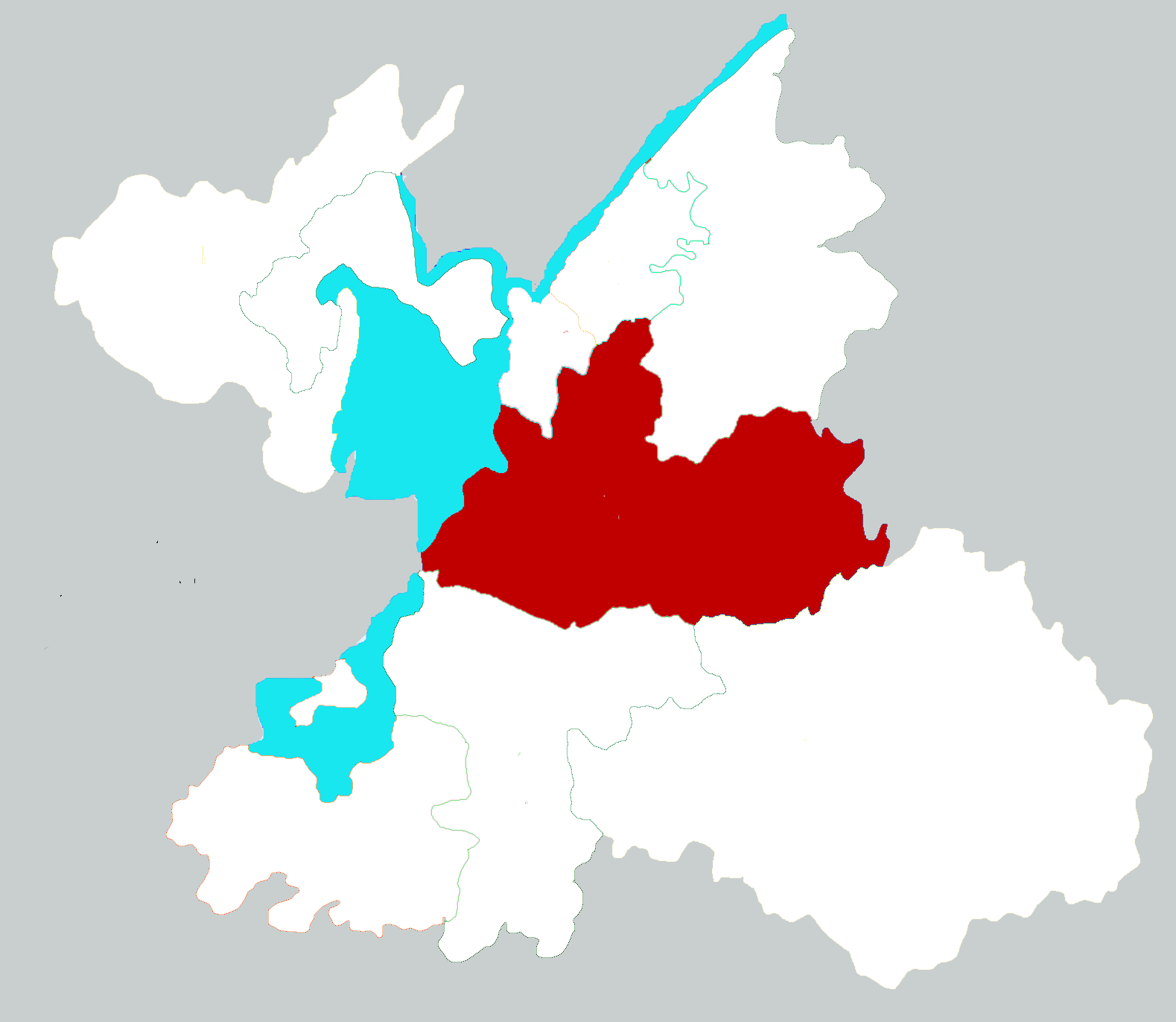
- Location of Yueyang County within Yueyang

- Location in Hunan
- Coordinates: 29°08′41″N 113°06′58″E
- Country: People's Republic of China
- Province: Hunan
- Prefecture-level city: Yueyang

Area
  - Total: 2,905 km^{2} (1,122 sq mi)

Population
  - Total: 561,900
  - Density: 193.4/km^{2} (501.0/sq mi)
- Time zone: UTC+8 (China Standard)
- Postal code: 4140XX
- Area code: 0730

Yueyang County (simplified Chinese: 岳阳县; traditional Chinese: 岳陽縣; pinyin: Yuèyáng Xiàn) is a county in Hunan province, China. It is under the administration of Yueyang City.

The county is located on the northeastern margin of the province; the Xiang River runs through the west of the county from south to east, most of the county is located on the eastern shore of the Dongting Lake. It is bordered to the north by Jianli County of Hubei, Linxiang City, Yunxi and Yueyanglou Districts, to the northwest and the west by Junshan District and Nan County, to the south by Yuanjiang, Miluo Cities, Xiangyin and Pingjiang Counties, and to the east by Tongcheng County of Hubei.

Yueyang County covers an area of 2,893.3 km^{2} (1,117.1 sq mi), as of 2015, it had a registered population of 720,660 and a permanent resident population of 733,300. The county has 11 towns and three townships under its jurisdiction. The government seat is Rongjiawan (荣家湾镇).

== Administrative divisions ==
In 2015, Yueyang had three townships and 11 towns under its jurisdiction. The township of Yanglin was reorganized as the town of Yanglinjie on November 17, 2017. The county now has two townships and 12 towns under its jurisdiction.

2 townships

- Changhu (长湖乡)
- Zhongzhou (中洲乡)

12 towns

- Baixiang (柏祥镇)
- Buxian (步仙镇)
- Gangkou (筻口镇)
- Gongtian (公田镇)
- Huangshajie (黄沙街镇)
- Maotian (毛田镇)
- Rongjiawan (荣家湾镇)
- Xinkai (新开镇)
- Xinqiang (新墙镇)
- Yanglinjie (杨林街镇)
- Yuetian (月田镇)
- Zhangguying (张谷英镇)
