= Miluo City =

Miluo 汨罗市
- County-level city
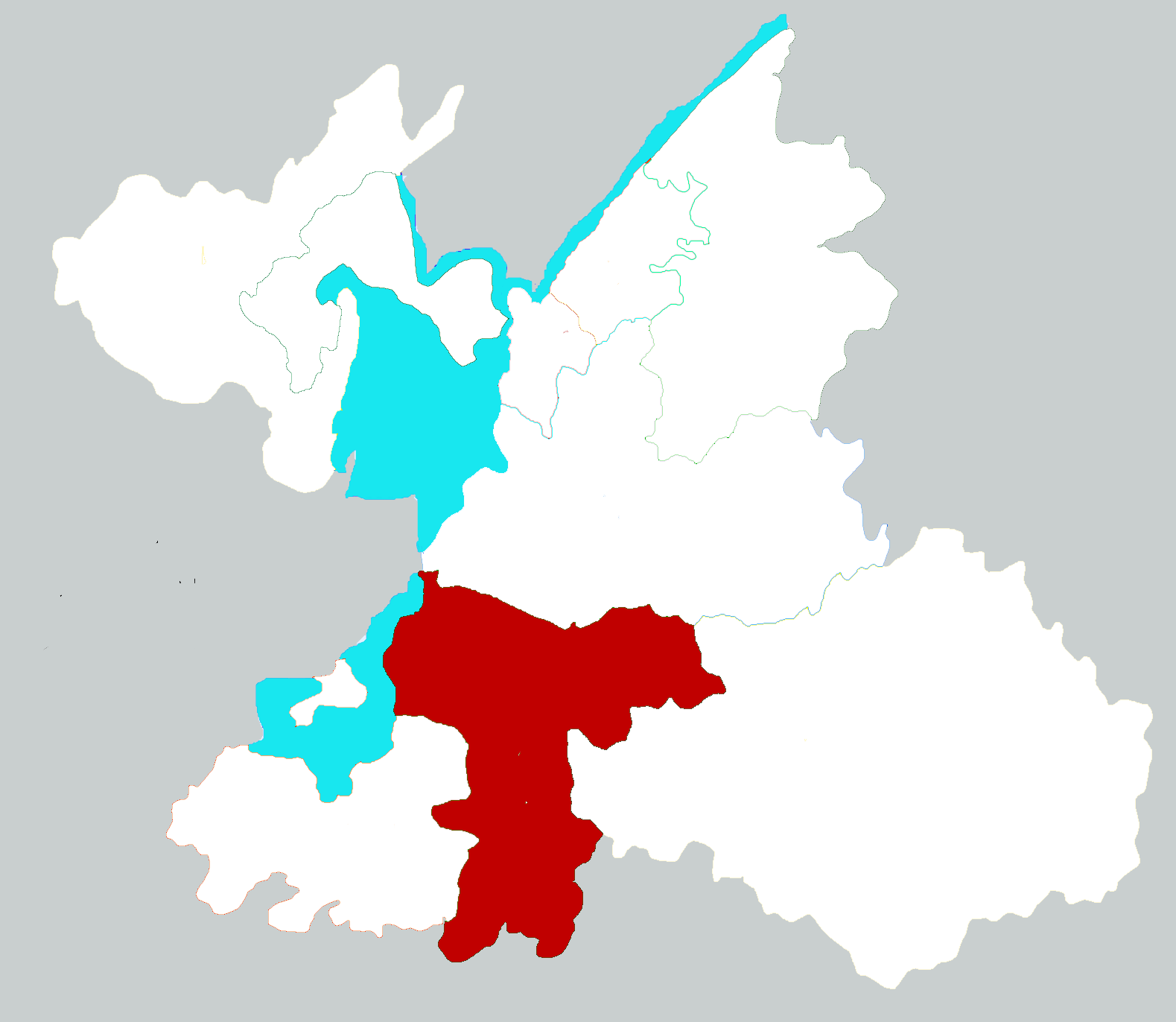
- Location of Miluo City within Yueyang

- Location in Hunan
- Coordinates: 28°45′40″N 113°09′36″E
- Country: People's Republic of China
- Province: Hunan
- Prefecture-level city: Yueyang

Area
  - County-level city: 1,484.0 km^{2} (573.0 sq mi)
  - Urban: 20.20 km^{2} (7.80 sq mi)

Population (2017)
  - County-level city: 685,000
  - Density: 462/km^{2} (1,200/sq mi)
  - Urban: 158,000
- Time zone: UTC+8 (China Standard)
- Website: miluo.gov.cn

Miluo (simplified Chinese: 汨罗; traditional Chinese: 汨羅; pinyin: Mìluó) is a county-level city in Hunan province, China, under the administration of the prefecture-level city of Yueyang. The city is located on the northeast of the province and on the eastern bank of the Xiang River, it is to the north of the city proper of Changsha City. Miluo is bordered to the north by Yueyang County, to the east by Pingjiang County, to the south by Changsha County and Wangcheng District of Changsha City, and to the west by Xiangyin County and Yuanjiang City. Miluo covers an area of 1,669.8 km^{2} (644.7 sq mi), and as of 2015, it had a permanent resident population of 668,156. The city has three subdistricts and 10 towns under its jurisdiction. The government seat is Guiyi (归义镇).

Miluo City is named after the River of Miluo, which is a tributary in the lower reaches of the Xiang River. Miluo River is known that it is the source place of Dragon Boat Festival.

== Administrative divisions ==
According to the result on adjustment of township-level administrative divisions of Miluo city on December 3, 2015, Miluo city has one subdistrict, one township and 17 towns under its jurisdiction. They are:

1 subdistrict

- Tianwen (天问街道) (Quyuan mgmt Dist)

1 township

- Fenghuang (凤凰乡) (Quyuan mgmt Dist)

17 towns

- Baishui (白水镇)
- Baitang (白塘镇)
- Bishi (弼时镇)
- Changle (长乐镇)
- Chuanshanping (川山坪镇)
- Dajing (大荆镇)
- Guiyi (归义镇)
- Gupei (古培镇)
- Heshi (河市镇) (Quyuan mgmt Dist)
- Luojiang (罗江镇)
- Miluo town (汨罗镇)
- Quzici (屈子祠镇)
- Sanjiang (三江镇)
- Shendingshan (神鼎山镇)
- Taolinshi (桃林寺镇)
- Xinshi (新市镇)
- Yingtian (营田镇) (Quyuan mgmt Dist)

== Climate ==
Climate data for Miluo, elevation 83 m (272 ft), (1991–2020 normals, extremes 1981–present)
Month	Jan	Feb	Mar	Apr	May	Jun	Jul	Aug	Sep	Oct	Nov	Dec	Year
Record high °C (°F)	24.2 (75.6)	30.1 (86.2)	33.1 (91.6)	36.0 (96.8)	36.6 (97.9)	38.8 (101.8)	40.8 (105.4)	40.4 (104.7)	37.9 (100.2)	35.1 (95.2)	32.0 (89.6)	24.6 (76.3)	40.8 (105.4)
Mean daily maximum °C (°F)	8.7 (47.7)	11.8 (53.2)	16.3 (61.3)	22.7 (72.9)	27.1 (80.8)	30.2 (86.4)	33.5 (92.3)	32.9 (91.2)	28.8 (83.8)	23.5 (74.3)	17.6 (63.7)	11.5 (52.7)	22.1 (71.7)
Daily mean °C (°F)	5.0 (41.0)	7.7 (45.9)	11.9 (53.4)	18.0 (64.4)	22.7 (72.9)	26.0 (78.8)	29.1 (84.4)	28.4 (83.1)	24.2 (75.6)	18.6 (65.5)	12.7 (54.9)	7.1 (44.8)	17.6 (63.7)
Mean daily minimum °C (°F)	2.3 (36.1)	4.7 (40.5)	8.7 (47.7)	14.4 (57.9)	19.1 (66.4)	22.9 (73.2)	25.7 (78.3)	25.0 (77.0)	20.8 (69.4)	15.0 (59.0)	9.2 (48.6)	4.0 (39.2)	14.3 (57.8)
Record low °C (°F)	−6.8 (19.8)	−9.5 (14.9)	−2.2 (28.0)	2.6 (36.7)	9.7 (49.5)	13.4 (56.1)	19.0 (66.2)	17.1 (62.8)	11.4 (52.5)	3.1 (37.6)	−1.8 (28.8)	−9.5 (14.9)	−9.5 (14.9)
Average precipitation mm (inches)	76.1 (3.00)	84.0 (3.31)	142.5 (5.61)	175.4 (6.91)	206.5 (8.13)	210.7 (8.30)	181.5 (7.15)	110.9 (4.37)	74.9 (2.95)	70.0 (2.76)	77.1 (3.04)	48.6 (1.91)	1,458.2 (57.44)
Average precipitation days (≥ 0.1 mm)	13.3	13.4	16.4	16.1	15.0	15.1	11.3	10.3	8.6	10.1	10.2	10.2	150
Average snowy days	4.2	2.1	0.6	0	0	0	0	0	0	0	0	1.2	8.1
Average relative humidity (%)	81	80	81	79	79	82	77	79	80	80	80	79	80
Mean monthly sunshine hours	78.2	78.3	97.4	125.7	149.7	146.3	223.8	220.8	166.4	146.3	123.4	111.3	1,667.6
Percentage possible sunshine	24	25	26	32	35	35	53	55	45	42	39	35	37
Source: China Meteorological Administration all-time extreme temperature
