= Hanchang Town =

Town in Hunan, China

Hanchang Town (Chinese: 汉昌镇; pinyin: Hànchāng Zhèn) is a town and the county seat of Pingjiang in Hunan, China. It was reformed through the amalgamation of Chengguan Town (Chinese: 城关镇) and Dongyuan Township (Chinese: 东源乡) in 1995. The town is located in the centre of the western Pingjiang County, bordered by Sanyang Township (Chinese: 三阳乡) to the south and south east, Meixian Town (Chinese: 梅仙镇) to the north east, and Wengjiang Town (Chinese: 瓮江镇) to the north west and west. The town has an area of 52.7 km^{2} (20.3 sq mi) with a population of 96,121 (as of 2010 census). Through the amalgamation of village-level divisions in 2016, the town has 14 villages and 16 communities under its jurisdiction. Its seat is Jingfuping Community (Chinese: 景福坪社区).

== History ==
Hanchang is an ancient town with a history of more than one thousand years. Hanchang Town was established in 1935, it took the name of the ancient Hanchang County (Chinese: 汉昌县), the seat of the ancient Changjiang County (Chinese: 昌江县) was transferred to the place (Heling (Chinese: 鹤岭) of historic name) in 809 AD (Tang dynasty). Changjiang County was renamed to the present name of Pingjiang County in 923 AD, from then on, it has been the county seat of Pingjiang.

After its establishment in 1935, its name went through several revisions. It was renamed as Chengguan District (Chinese: 城关区) in June 1950, as Chengguan Town (Chinese: 城关镇) in December 1950, as Penghuang Commune (Chinese: 彭黄公社) in September 1958, as Chengguan Commune (Chinese: 城关公社) in 1959, as Chengguan Town (Chinese: 城关镇) in 1961. It was once again reformed as Hanchang Town through the amalgamation of Chengguan Town and Dongyuan Township and named after the historical name in 1995.

== Administrative divisions ==
Administrative Divisions of Hanchang Town
| 14 villages | | 16 communities | |
| English | Chinese | English | Chinese |
| Beicheng Village | 北城村 | Baihuatai Community | 百花台社区 |
| Beifu Village | 北附村 | Bitan Community | 碧潭社区 |
| Beiyuan Village | 北源村 | Fouqiaojie Community | 浮桥街社区 |
| Chengdong Village | 城东村 | Huaqiao Community | 画桥社区 |
| Chengping Village | 城坪村 | Jingfuping Community | 景福坪社区 |
| Chengtan Village | 澄潭村 | Jingkan Community | 井墈社区 |
| Chengxi Village | 城西村 | Jinhua Community | 金华社区 |
| Chengxin Village | 城新村 | Minjianlu Community | 民建路社区 |
| Fengshu Village | 枫树村 | Pingshang Community | 坪上社区 |
| Sanwangchong Village | 三望冲村 | Qiming Community | 启明社区 |
| Sanyang Village | 三阳村 | Shoujiaping Community | 首家坪社区 |
| Sima Village | 驷马村 | Shuyuan Community | 书院社区 |
| Tianyue Village | 天岳村 | Siqian Community | 寺前社区 |
| Yingrui Village | 迎瑞村 | Sizhulu Community | 四柱路社区 |
| | | Tongjialing Community | 童家岭社区 |
| | | Yuechitang Community | 月池塘社区 |

== Amalgamation of village-level divisions in 2016 ==
a village and 7 communities reorganized through the amalgamation of village-level divisions in 2016
| the present name | | the amalgamation in 2016 | |
| English | Chinese | English | Chinese |
| Chengxin Village | 城新村 | organized through the amalgamation of Sifangtang Village and Chengjiao Villae | 四方塘村, 城新村 |
| Huaqiao Community | 画桥社区 | organized through the amalgamation of Chengjiao Village and the former Huaqiao Community | 城郊村, 画桥社区 |
| Jingfuping Community | 景福坪社区 | Nanjie Community renamed | 南街社区改名 |
| Jingkan Community | 井墈社区 | reorganized the former Jinkan Village | 井墈村改 |
| Jinhua Community | 金华社区 | Beijie Community renamed | 北街社区改名 |
| Minjianlu Community | 民建路社区 | Dongjie Community renamed | 东街社区改名 |
| Shoujiaping Community | 首家坪社区 | organized through the amalgamation of Gucheng Village and the former Shoujiaping Community | 首家坪社区, 古城村并入 |
| Yuechitang Community | 月池塘社区 | Xijie Community renamed | 西街社区改名 |
