= Junshan, Yueyang =

Junshan 君山区
- District
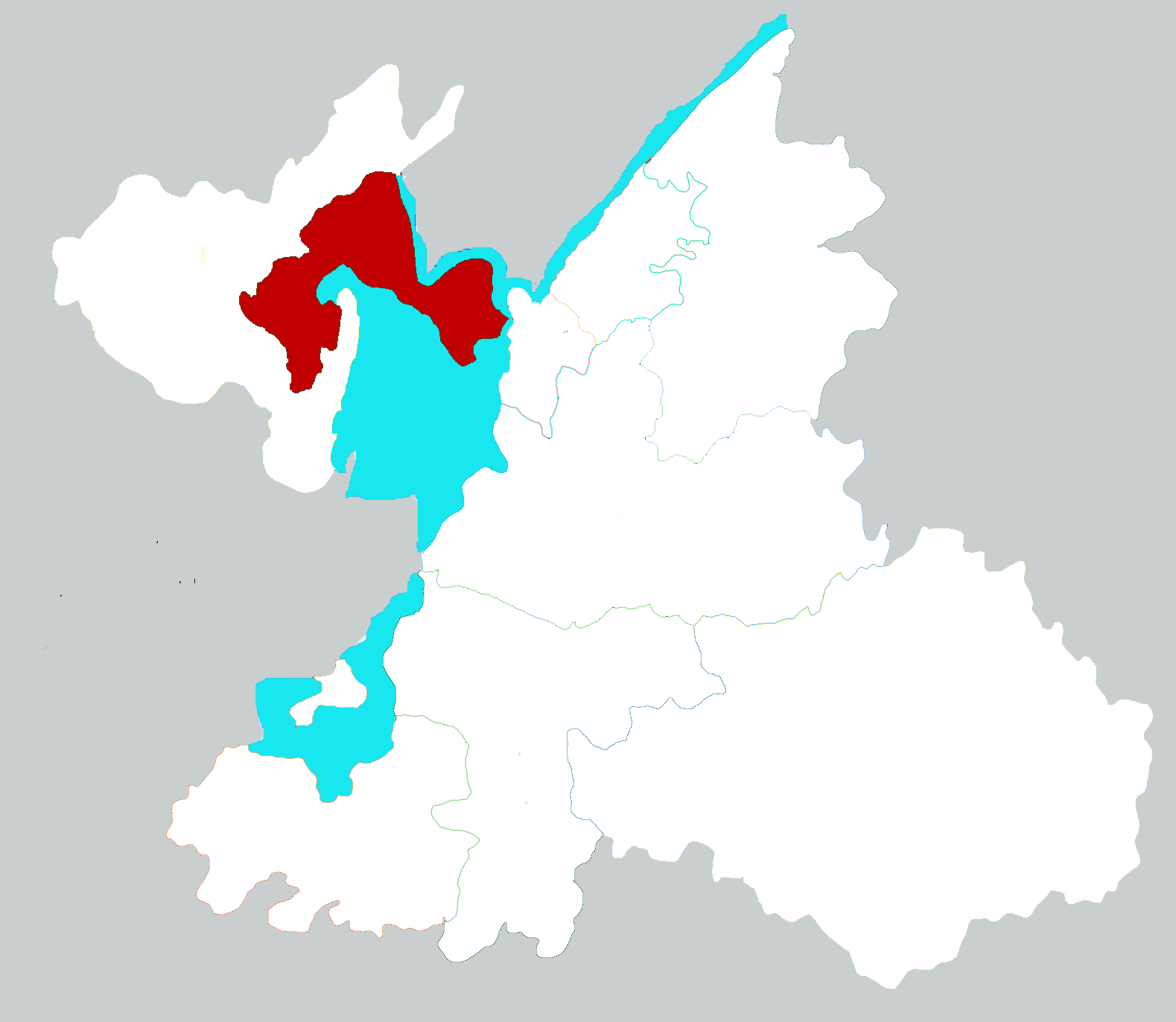
- Location of Junshan District within Yueyang

- Location in Hunan
- Coordinates: 29°27′40″N 113°00′23″E
- Country: China
- Province: Hunan
- Prefecture-level city: Yueyang
- District seat: Liulinzhou Subdistrict

Area
  - Total: 627.1 km^{2} (242.1 sq mi)

Population (2020 census)
  - Total: 201,634
  - Density: 321.5/km^{2} (832.8/sq mi)
- Time zone: UTC+8 (China Standard)
- Website: www.junshan.gov.cn

Junshan District (simplified Chinese: 君山区; traditional Chinese: 君山區; pinyin: Jūnshān Qū) is one of three urban districts in Yueyang City, Hunan province, China. The district is located in the west of the city proper, on the northern shore of Dongting Lake and the southwestern bank of Yangtze River. It is bordered by Huarong County to the west, Nan County to the south, Yueyang County to the east, and across the Yangtze to the north by Jianli County of Hubei. Junshan District covers an area 627.90 km^{2} (242.43 sq mi), and as of 2015, it had a registered population of 243,106. The district has four towns and a subdistrict under its jurisdiction. The government seat is Liulinzhou (柳林洲街道).

Junshan District is named after the islet of Junshan, where is the source place of the famous Chinese tea Junshan Yinzhen. The islet of Junshan, with long history of culture resources, is rich of remains and relics, it is also one of Chinese AAAAA-rated tourist attractions.

== Administrative divisions ==
After an adjustment of township-level administrative divisions of Junshan District on 20 November 2015, Junshan District has 1 subdistrict and four towns under its jurisdiction. They are:

1 subdistrict

- Liulinzhou (柳林洲街道)

4 towns

- Guangxinzhou (广兴洲镇)
- Liangxinbao (良心堡镇)
- Qianlianghu (钱粮湖镇)
- Xushi (许市镇)
