= Yueyanglou, Yueyang =

Yueyanglou 岳阳楼区
- District
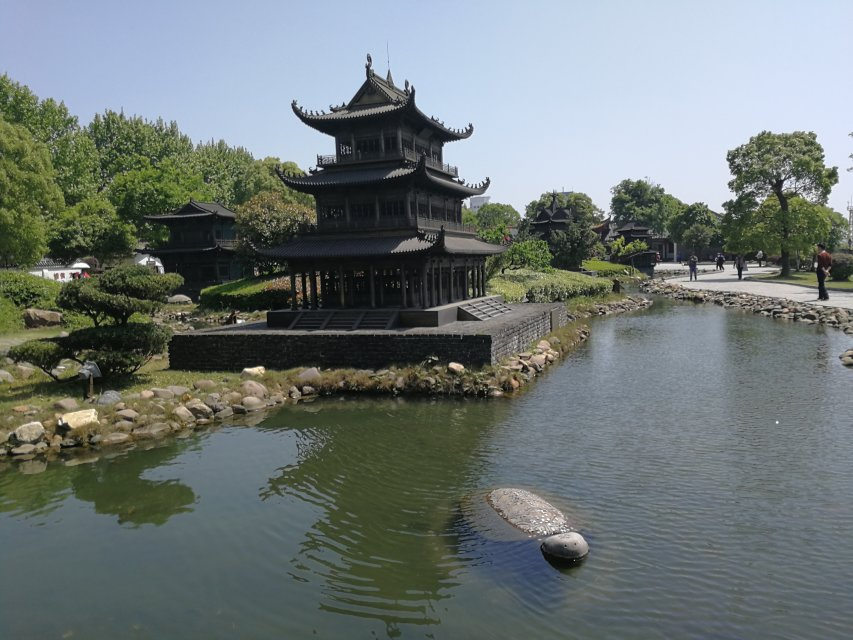

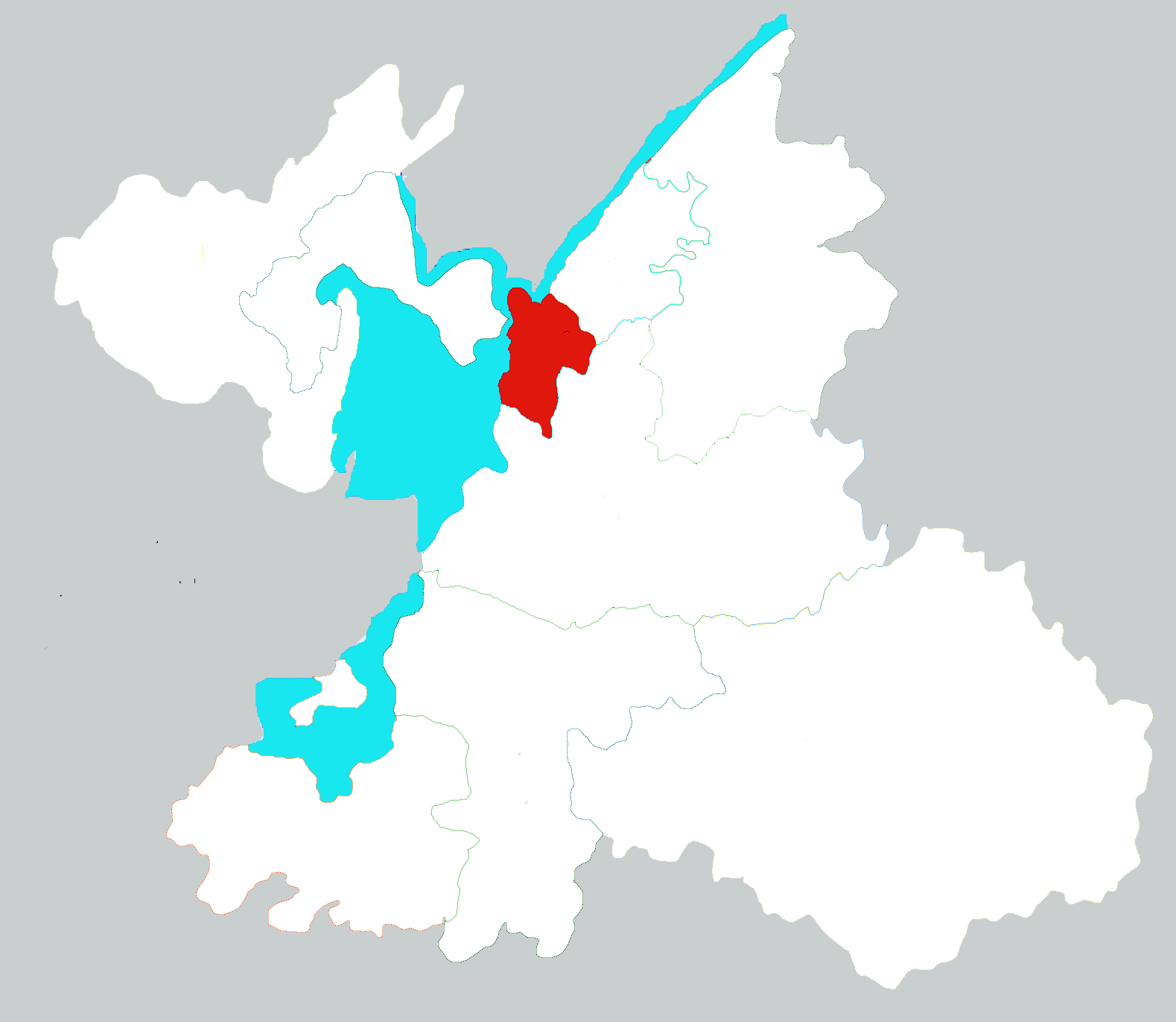
- Location of Yueyanglou in Yueyang

- Location in Hunan
- Coordinates: 29°20′45″N 113°12′42″E
- Country: People's Republic of China
- Province: Hunan
- Prefecture-level city: Yueyang
- Government seat: Wulipai

Area
  - Total: 464.55 km^{2} (179.36 sq mi)

Population (2015)
  - Total: 514,100
  - Density: 1,107/km^{2} (2,866/sq mi)
- Time zone: UTC+8 (China Standard)

Yueyanglou District (simplified Chinese: 岳阳楼区; traditional Chinese: 岳陽樓區; pinyin: Yuèyánglóu Qū) is one of three urban districts in Yueyang City, Hunan province, China; it is also the 3rd most populous district (after Heshan and Dingcheng Districts) in the province. The district is located in the middle part of the city proper of Yueyang, it is on the lake of Dongting's southeastern side, the lake flows into Yangtze in the north western outer margin of the district. The district is bordered by Jianli County of Hubei and Junshan District to the north, surrounded by Yueyang County to the west, the south and the southeast, and Yunxi District to the northeast. Yueyanglou District covers an area of 464.55 km^{2} (179.36 sq mi). As of 2015, it had a registered population of 514,100. The district has 17 subdistricts, a town and two townships under its jurisdiction. The government seat is Wulipai (五里牌街道).

Yueyanglou District is named after the Tower of Yueyang, the tower has a history of nearly 1800 years and it was built in the period of Three Kingdoms. the Yueyang Tower is also one of Chinese AAAAA-rated tourist attractions.

== Administrative divisions ==
According to the result on adjustment of township-level administrative divisions of Yueyanglou District on November 30, 2015, Yueyanglou has two townships and one town and 17 subdistricts under its jurisdiction. They are:

2 townships

- Guozhen (郭镇乡)
- Kangwang (康王乡)

1 town

- Xitang (西塘镇)

17 subdistricts

- Chenglingji (城陵矶街道)
- Dongmaoling (东茅岭街道)
- Dongting (洞庭街道)
- Fengshuhu (枫桥湖街道)
- Hubin (湖滨街道)
- Jin'eshan (金鹗山街道)
- Luowang (洛王街道)
- Lüxianting (吕仙亭街道)
- Nanhu (南湖街道)
- Qijialing (奇家岭街道)
- Qiusuo (求索街道)
- Sanyanqiao (三眼桥街道)
- Wangjiahe (王家河街道)
- Wangyuelu (望岳路街道)
- Wulipai (五里牌街道)
- Yueyanglou (岳阳楼街道)
- Zhanqianlu (站前路街道)
