= Yunxi, Yueyang =

Yunxi 云溪区
- District
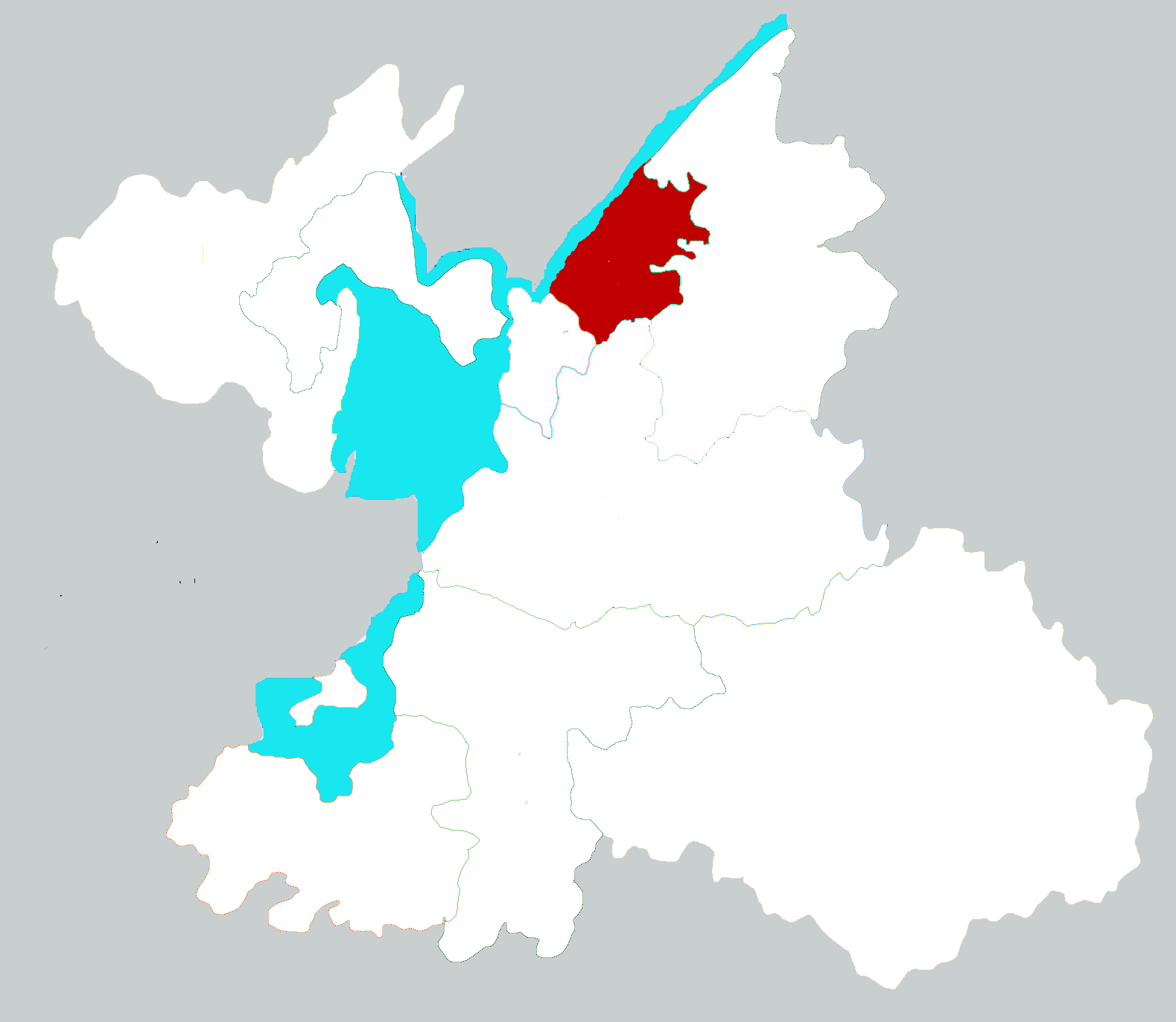
- Location of Yunxi in Yueyang

- Location in Hunan
- Coordinates: 29°28′22″N 113°16′20″E
- Country: People's Republic of China
- Province: Hunan
- Prefecture-level city: Yueyang

Area
  - Total: 403 km^{2} (156 sq mi)

Population
  - Total: 169,700
  - Density: 421/km^{2} (1,090/sq mi)
- Time zone: UTC+8 (China Standard)

Yunxi District (simplified Chinese: 云溪区; traditional Chinese: 雲溪區; pinyin: Yúnxī Qū) is one of three urban districts in Yueyang City, Hunan province, China; it is also the 4th smallest district by population (after Wulingyuan. Nanyue and Beita Districts) in the province. The district is located in the east of the city proper of Yueyang. Yunxi District is located on the southeastern shore of Yangtze River, the Lake of Dongting flows into the Yangtze in the south western outer margin of the district. It is bordered by Jianli County of Hubei across the Yangtze to the west and the northwest, by Linxiang City to the east, and by Yueyanglou District and Yueyang County to the south. Yunxi District covers an area of 403 km^{2} (156 sq mi), and as of 2015, it had a registered population of 169,700. The district has a subdistrict and three towns under its jurisdiction.

== Administrative divisions ==
After an adjustment of township-level administrative divisions of Yunxi District on 30 November 2015, Yunxi has three towns and one subdistrict under its jurisdiction. They are:

2 towns

- Lucheng (陆城镇)
- Lukou (路口镇)

2 subdistricts

- Changling (长岭街道)
- Yunxi (云溪街道)
