= Pingjiang County =

County in Hunan, China

Pingjiang County 平江县 Pingkiang
- County
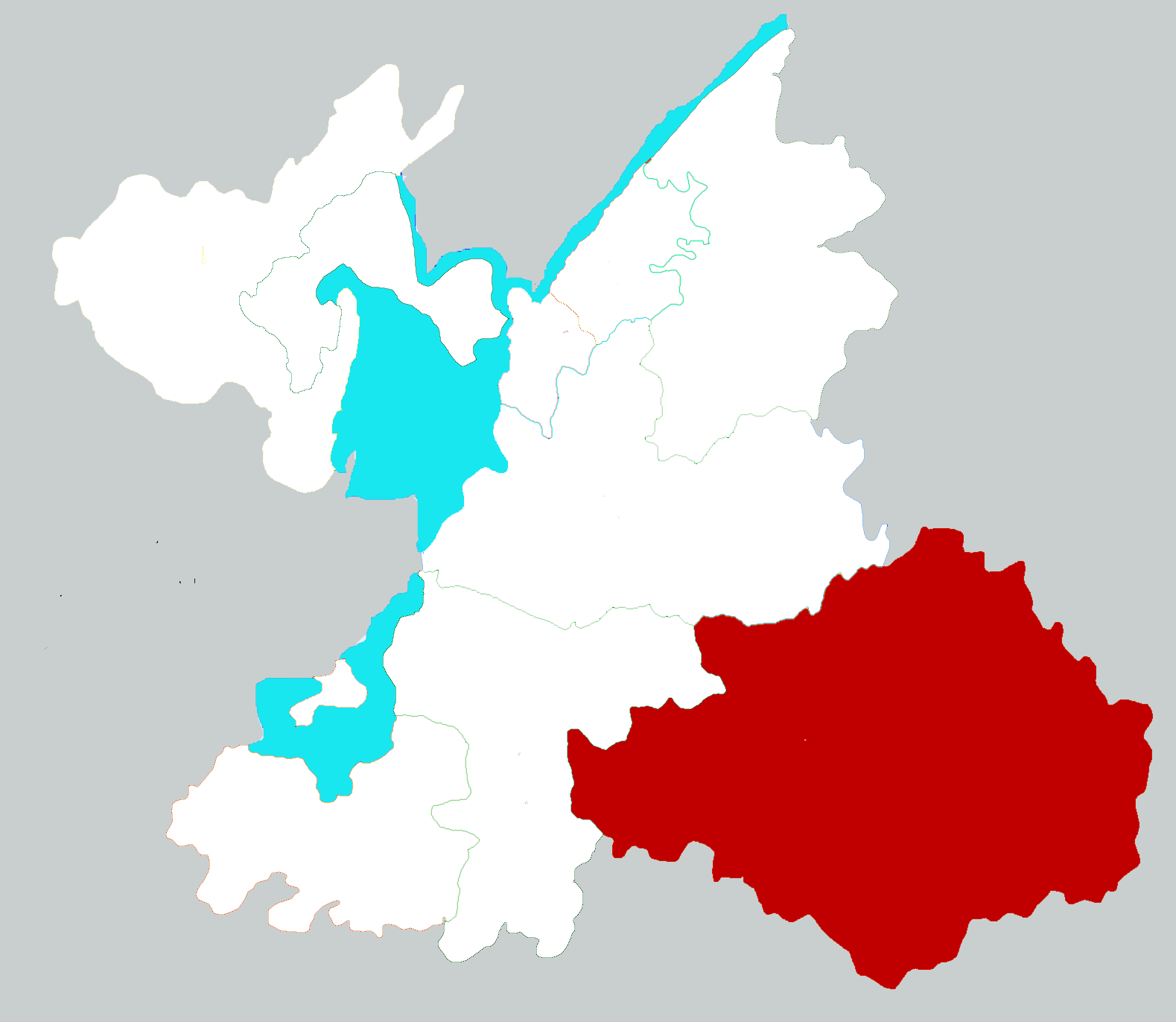
- Location of Pingjiang County within Yueyang

- Location of the seat in Hunan
- Coordinates: 28°42′07″N 113°34′52″E
- Country: People's Republic of China
- Province: Hunan
- Prefecture-level city: Yueyang

Area
  - Total: 4,114.43 km^{2} (1,588.59 sq mi)

Population
  - Total: 951,200
  - Density: 231.2/km^{2} (598.8/sq mi)
- Time zone: UTC+8 (China Standard)
- Website: www.pingjiang.gov.cn

Pingjiang County (simplified Chinese: 平江县; traditional Chinese: 平江縣; pinyin: Píngjiāng Xiàn) is a county in the northeast of Hunan province, China. It is the easternmost county-level division of the prefecture-level city of Yueyang.

The county is located on the eastern margin of the province, the Miluo River runs through the county from east to west. It is bordered to the north by Yueyang County, to the west by Miluo City, to the south by Changsha County and Liuyang City, to the east by Xiushui and Tonggu Counties of Jiangxi, and to the northeast by Tongcheng County of Hubei.

Pingjiang County covers an area of 4,114 km^{2} (1,588 sq mi). As of 2015, it had a registered population of 1,106,900 and a permanent resident population of 979,300. The county has 19 towns and 5 townships under its jurisdiction. The government seat is Hanchang Town (汉昌镇).

== History ==
In the Chinese Civil War, Pingjiang was a part of the Hunan-Hubei-Jiangxi Revolutionary Base Area (湘鄂赣革命根据地), and, from November 1931, of the Hunan-Hubei-Jiangxi Soviet (湘鄂赣苏维埃).

The Communist Marshal Peng Dehuai was a Kuomintang Colonel in 1928, when he was stationed in Pingjiang with orders to eliminate local groups of communist guerrillas who had fled to the area following Chiang Kai-shek's nationwide suppression of Communists. Because Peng had secretly joined the Chinese Communist Party he instead kept his unit passive and began to organize local Communist Party branches. Peng rebelled against the Kuomintang on 28 July 1928, beginning his career as a military leader in the Red Army from his base in Pingjiang. Some of Peng's subordinates in the rebellion survived and became important military figures themselves, including generals Huang Kecheng and Peng Shaohui.

== Administrative divisions ==
According to the result on adjustment of township-level administrative divisions of Pingjiang County on 24 November 2015, Pingjiang has 5 townships and 19 towns under its jurisdiction. They are:

5 townships

- Banjiang (板江乡)
- Dazhou (大洲乡)
- Mujin (木金乡)
- Sandun (三墩乡)
- Sanyang (三阳乡)

19 towns

- Anding (安定镇)
- Cenchuan (岑川镇)
- Changshou (长寿镇)
- Fushoushan (福寿山镇)
- Hanchang (汉昌镇)
- Hongqiao (虹桥镇)
- Jiayi (加义镇)
- Longmen (龙门镇)
- Meixian (梅仙镇)
- Nanjiang (Nankiang) (南江镇)
- Sanshi (三市镇)
- Shangtashi (上塔市镇)
- Tongshi (童市镇)
- Wengjiang (瓮江镇)
- Wukou (浯口镇)
- Wushi (伍市镇)
- Xiangjia (向家镇)
- Niushizhai (石牛寨镇)
- Yuping (余坪镇)

== Climate ==
Climate data for Pingjiang, elevation 106 m (348 ft), (1991–2020 normals, extremes 1981–present)
Month	Jan	Feb	Mar	Apr	May	Jun	Jul	Aug	Sep	Oct	Nov	Dec	Year
Record high °C (°F)	24.2 (75.6)	29.5 (85.1)	32.9 (91.2)	35.0 (95.0)	35.8 (96.4)	38.4 (101.1)	40.0 (104.0)	40.8 (105.4)	38.5 (101.3)	35.1 (95.2)	32.2 (90.0)	24.0 (75.2)	40.8 (105.4)
Mean daily maximum °C (°F)	9.4 (48.9)	12.5 (54.5)	16.7 (62.1)	23.2 (73.8)	27.6 (81.7)	30.4 (86.7)	33.7 (92.7)	33.3 (91.9)	29.7 (85.5)	24.4 (75.9)	18.4 (65.1)	12.3 (54.1)	22.6 (72.7)
Daily mean °C (°F)	5.0 (41.0)	7.6 (45.7)	11.5 (52.7)	17.4 (63.3)	22.0 (71.6)	25.4 (77.7)	28.4 (83.1)	27.7 (81.9)	23.9 (75.0)	18.4 (65.1)	12.4 (54.3)	6.9 (44.4)	17.2 (63.0)
Mean daily minimum °C (°F)	2.0 (35.6)	4.3 (39.7)	7.9 (46.2)	13.3 (55.9)	17.9 (64.2)	21.8 (71.2)	24.4 (75.9)	23.9 (75.0)	20.0 (68.0)	14.4 (57.9)	8.5 (47.3)	3.3 (37.9)	13.5 (56.2)
Record low °C (°F)	−7.1 (19.2)	−6.4 (20.5)	−4.6 (23.7)	0.0 (32.0)	7.9 (46.2)	13.0 (55.4)	17.1 (62.8)	17.4 (63.3)	9.5 (49.1)	1.2 (34.2)	−3.1 (26.4)	−9.4 (15.1)	−9.4 (15.1)
Average precipitation mm (inches)	76.5 (3.01)	85.3 (3.36)	154.8 (6.09)	181.0 (7.13)	219.3 (8.63)	259.5 (10.22)	190.2 (7.49)	145.3 (5.72)	73.9 (2.91)	62.5 (2.46)	78.7 (3.10)	49.3 (1.94)	1,576.3 (62.06)
Average precipitation days (≥ 0.1 mm)	13.6	12.8	17.1	16.1	15.5	15.3	12.0	12.1	8.5	9.2	9.9	10.2	152.3
Average snowy days	3.6	1.9	0.4	0	0	0	0	0	0	0	0.1	1.2	7.2
Average relative humidity (%)	80	79	80	79	79	82	77	79	78	77	79	78	79
Mean monthly sunshine hours	67.8	72.8	83.2	104.9	129.3	129.9	211.6	203	164.9	141.8	118.2	106.7	1,534.1
Percentage possible sunshine	21	23	22	27	31	31	50	50	45	40	37	33	34
Source: China Meteorological Administration
