= Linxiang, Hunan =

Linxiang 临湘市 Linsiang
- County-level city
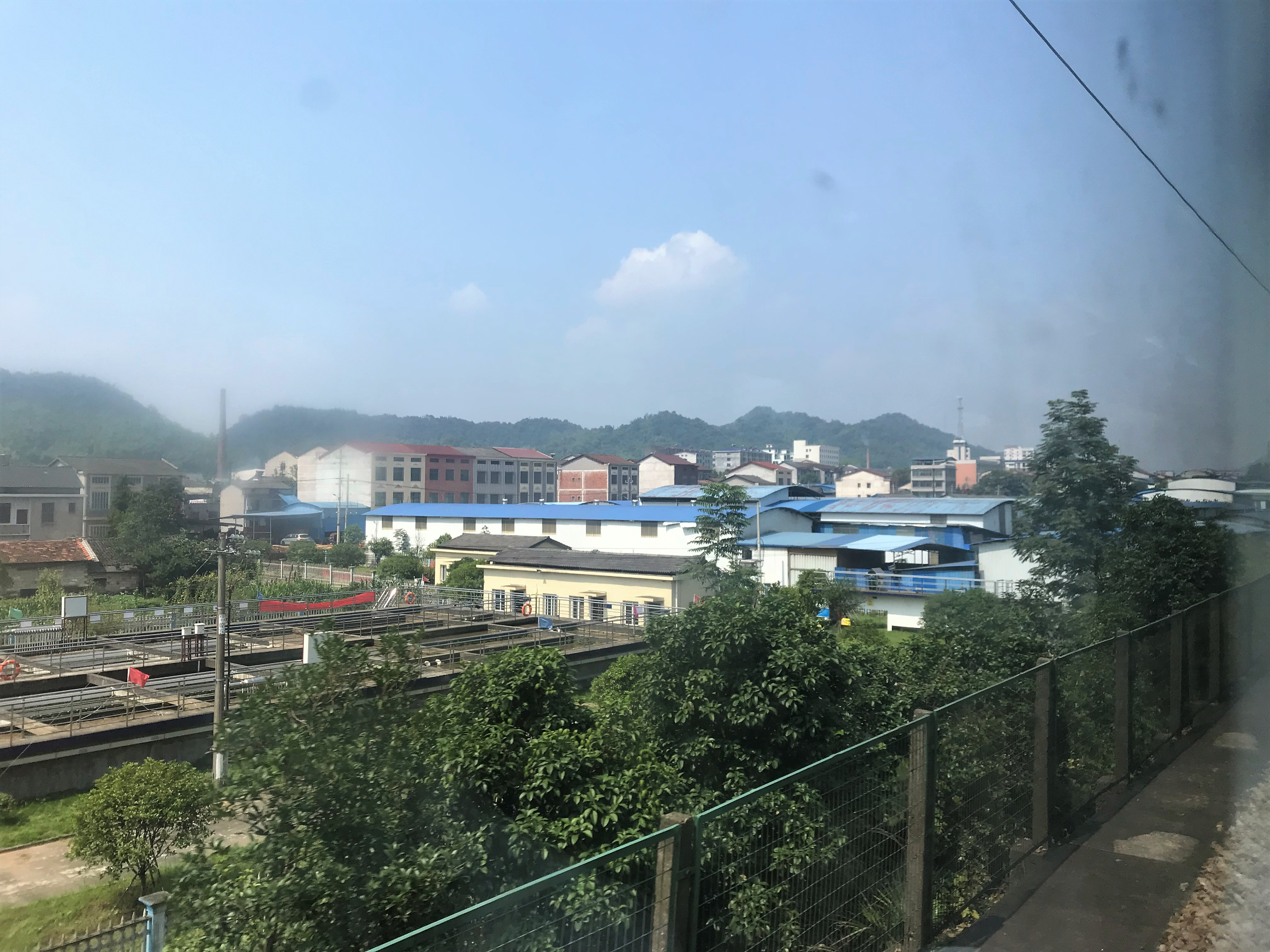
- Yanglousi Town

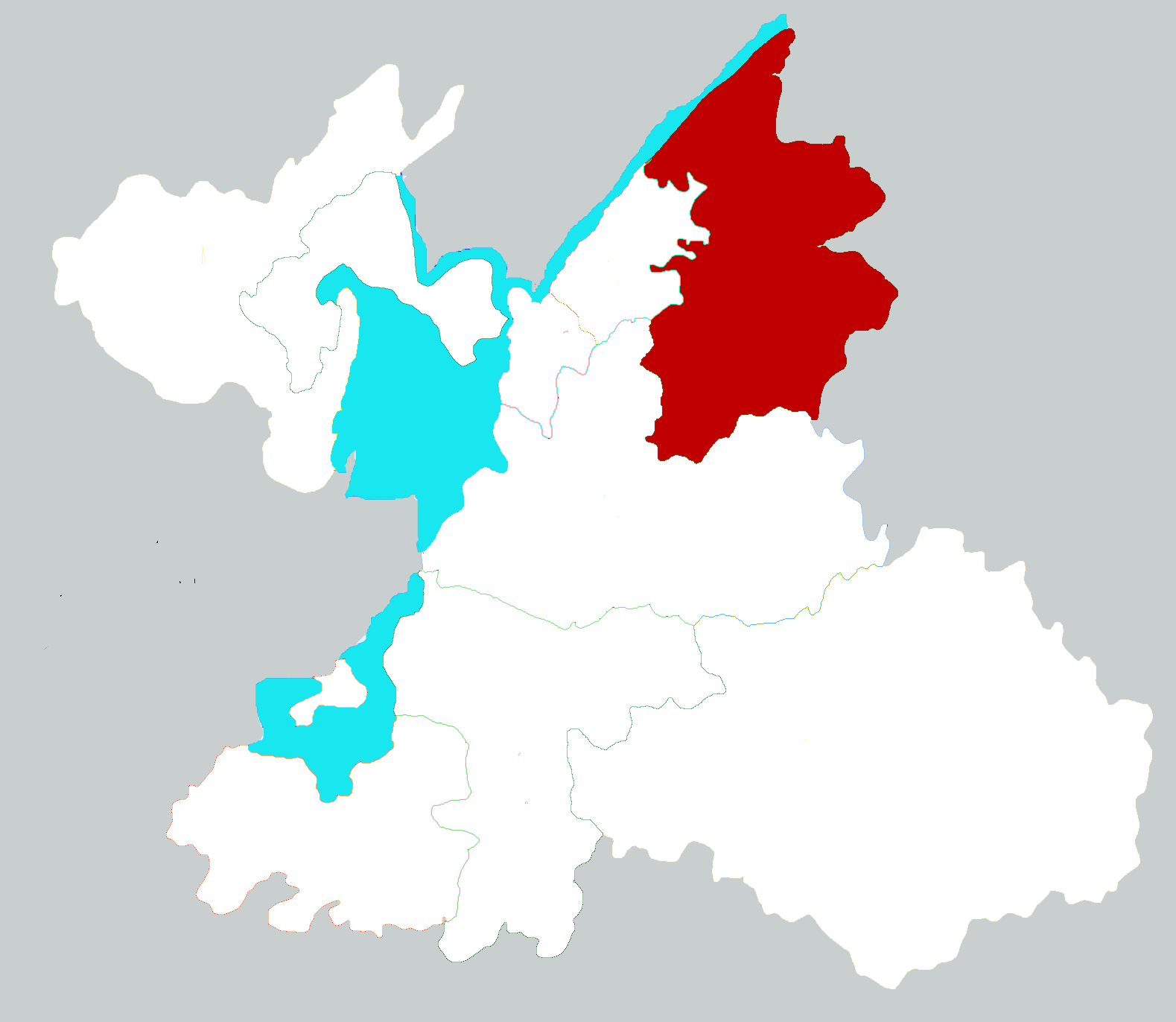
- Location of Linxiang City within Yueyang

- Location in Hunan
- Coordinates: 29°28′36″N 113°27′01″E
- Country: People's Republic of China
- Province: Hunan
- Prefecture-level city: Yueyang

Area
  - County-level city: 1,718.0 km^{2} (663.3 sq mi)
  - Urban: 25.00 km^{2} (9.65 sq mi)

Population (2017)
  - County-level city: 570,000
  - Density: 330/km^{2} (860/sq mi)
  - Urban: 147,000
- Time zone: UTC+8 (China Standard)

Linxiang (simplified Chinese: 临湘; traditional Chinese: 臨湘; pinyin: Línxiāng) is a county-level city in Hunan province, China, it is under the administration of the prefecture-level city of Yueyang. Linxiang is located at the northeastern edge of Hunan province, on the southeastern (right) bank of the Yangtze River, which lies to the east of the city proper. Linxiang is bordered to the northwest and the north across the Yangtze by Jianli County and Honghu City of Hubei, to the east by Chibi City, Chongyang and Tongcheng Counties of Hubei, to the south and southwest by Yueyang County, and to the west by Yunxi District. It covers an area of 1,718 km^{2} (663 sq mi), and as of 2015, it had a registered population of 537,500. The city has 3 subdistricts and 10 towns under its jurisdiction. The government seat is Chang'an (长安街道).

== Administrative divisions ==
After an adjustment of township-level administrative divisions of Linxiang on 24 November 2015, Linxiang has 3 subdistricts and 10 towns under its jurisdiction.

3 subdistricts

- Chang'an (长安街道)
- Taokuang (桃矿街道)
- Wulipai (五里牌街道)

10 towns

- Baiyangtian (白羊田镇)
- Changtang (长塘镇)
- Huanggai (黄盖镇)
- Jiangnan (江南镇)
- Nieshi (聂市镇)
- Tandu (坦渡镇)
- Taolin (桃林镇)
- Yanglousi (羊楼司镇)
- Zhanqiao (詹桥镇)
- Zhongfang (忠防镇)

== Climate ==
Climate data for Linxiang, elevation 60 m (200 ft), (1991–2020 normals, extremes 1968–present)
Month	Jan	Feb	Mar	Apr	May	Jun	Jul	Aug	Sep	Oct	Nov	Dec	Year
Record high °C (°F)	23.0 (73.4)	28.5 (83.3)	33.8 (92.8)	34.6 (94.3)	36.0 (96.8)	38.0 (100.4)	39.7 (103.5)	40.4 (104.7)	37.7 (99.9)	34.8 (94.6)	31.3 (88.3)	23.8 (74.8)	40.4 (104.7)
Mean daily maximum °C (°F)	8.6 (47.5)	11.7 (53.1)	16.2 (61.2)	22.7 (72.9)	27.1 (80.8)	30.2 (86.4)	33.3 (91.9)	32.6 (90.7)	28.6 (83.5)	23.2 (73.8)	17.3 (63.1)	11.3 (52.3)	21.9 (71.4)
Daily mean °C (°F)	4.5 (40.1)	7.2 (45.0)	11.6 (52.9)	17.7 (63.9)	22.4 (72.3)	25.8 (78.4)	29.0 (84.2)	28.0 (82.4)	23.7 (74.7)	18.1 (64.6)	12.1 (53.8)	6.6 (43.9)	17.2 (63.0)
Mean daily minimum °C (°F)	1.6 (34.9)	4.0 (39.2)	8.2 (46.8)	13.9 (57.0)	18.6 (65.5)	22.6 (72.7)	25.7 (78.3)	24.8 (76.6)	20.2 (68.4)	14.4 (57.9)	8.5 (47.3)	3.3 (37.9)	13.8 (56.9)
Record low °C (°F)	−18.1 (−0.6)	−7.7 (18.1)	−3.0 (26.6)	1.3 (34.3)	8.5 (47.3)	11.5 (52.7)	18.2 (64.8)	16.4 (61.5)	10.6 (51.1)	0.6 (33.1)	−1.9 (28.6)	−11.0 (12.2)	−18.1 (−0.6)
Average precipitation mm (inches)	70.5 (2.78)	86.6 (3.41)	127.6 (5.02)	198.6 (7.82)	206.6 (8.13)	255.1 (10.04)	234.1 (9.22)	149.8 (5.90)	97.4 (3.83)	78.5 (3.09)	81.8 (3.22)	44.1 (1.74)	1,630.7 (64.2)
Average precipitation days (≥ 0.1 mm)	11.9	12.5	15.4	14.7	14.8	14.4	12.7	12.0	8.8	10.3	10.3	9.4	147.2
Average snowy days	5.3	2.6	0.9	0	0	0	0	0	0	0	0.2	1.7	10.7
Average relative humidity (%)	78	78	77	75	76	79	75	78	78	77	78	75	77
Mean monthly sunshine hours	78.7	78.4	95.4	126.9	143.6	145.4	200.0	187.9	145.4	131.8	114.7	102.8	1,551
Percentage possible sunshine	24	25	26	33	34	35	47	46	40	38	36	32	35
Source: China Meteorological Administrationall-time extreme temperatures
