= Yueyang =

Yueyang 岳阳市 Yuehyang; Yoyang
- Prefecture-level city
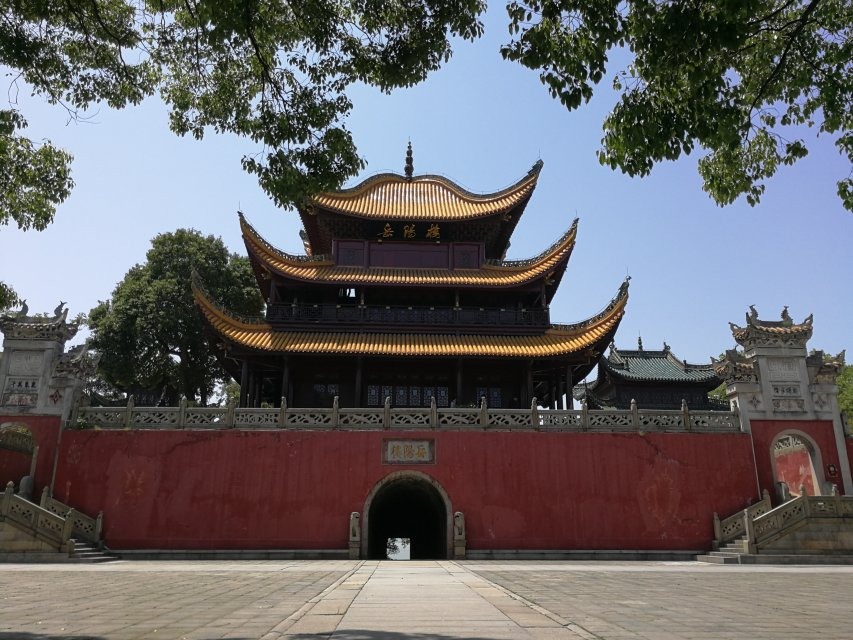
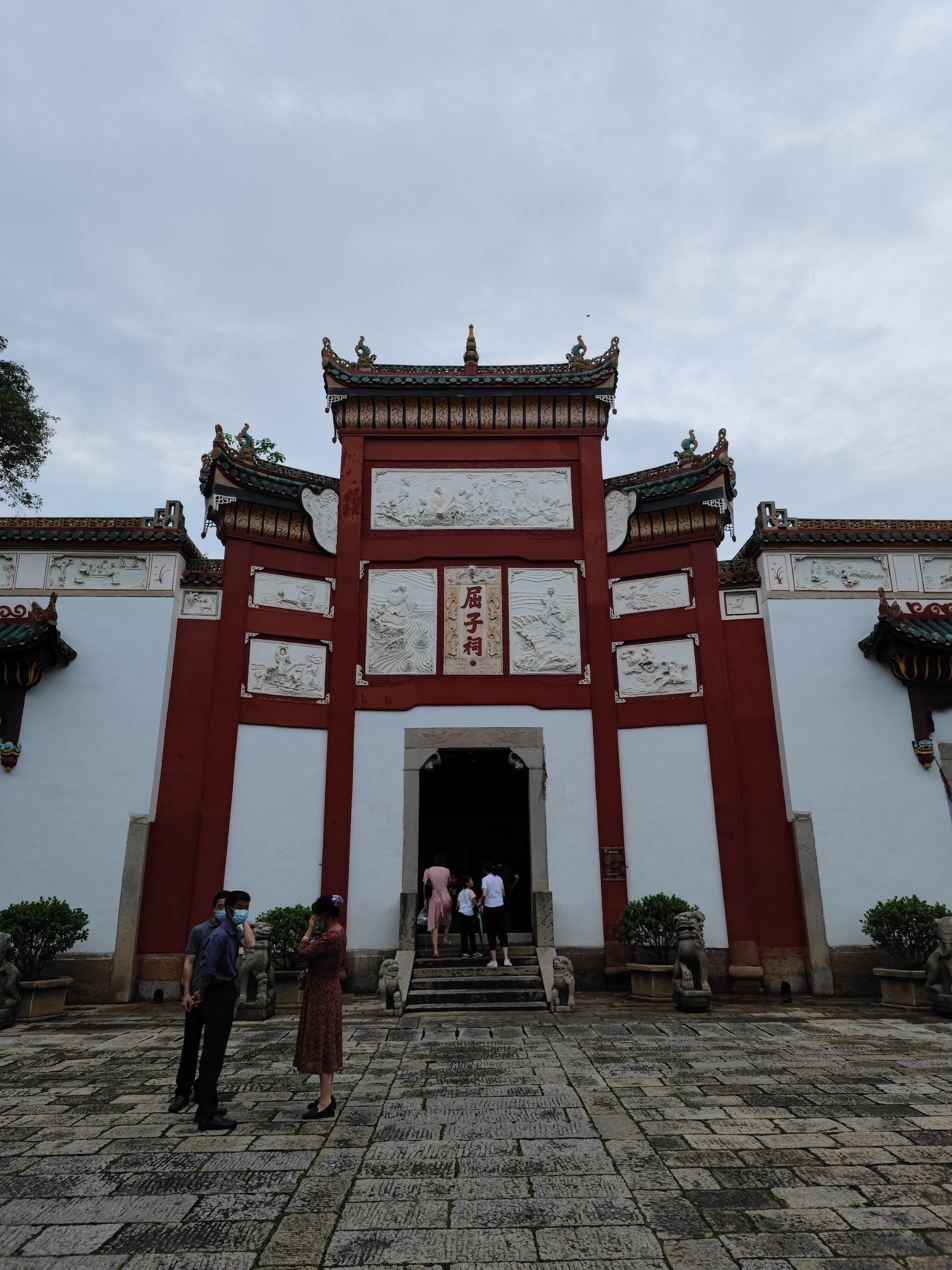
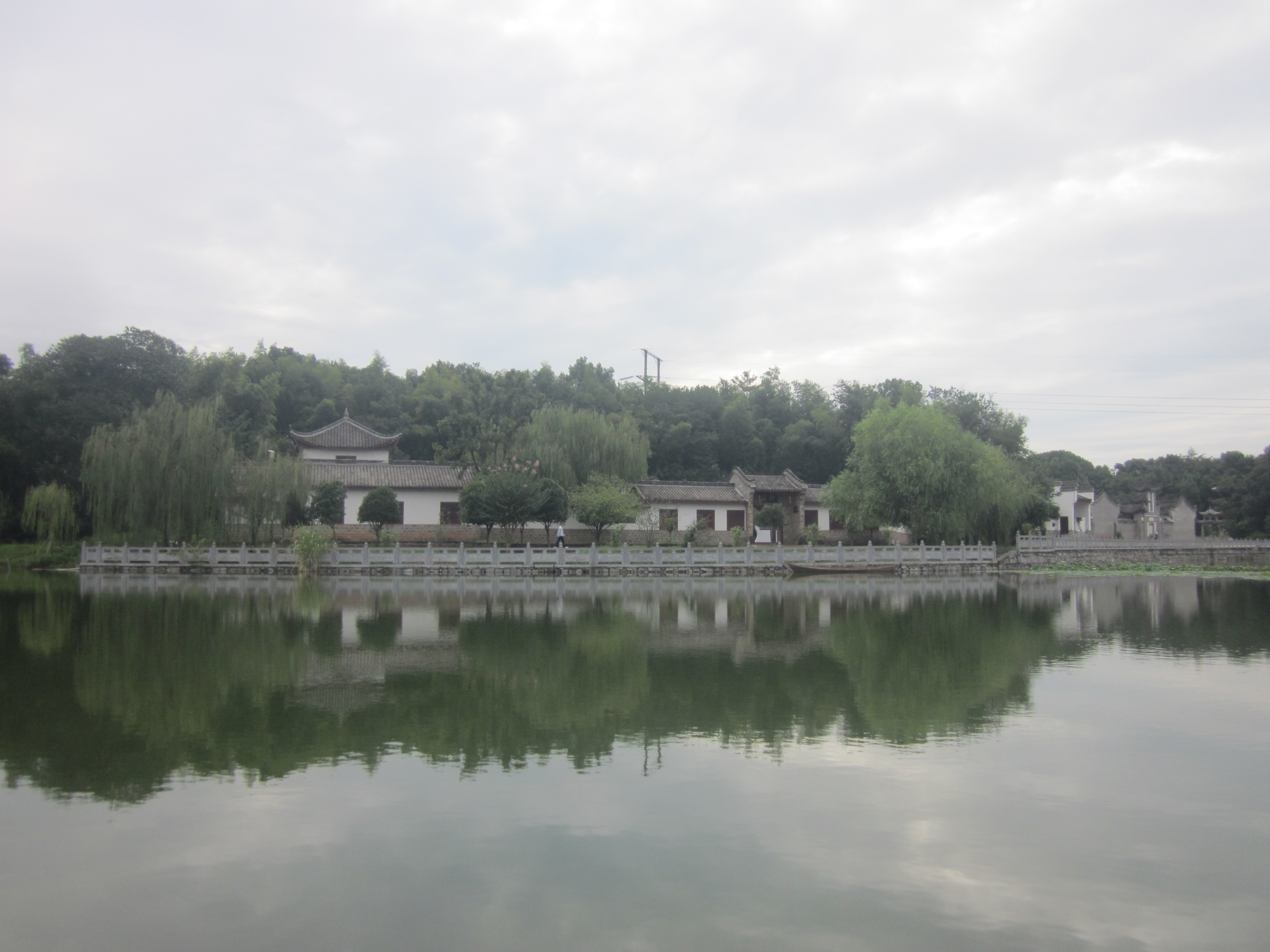
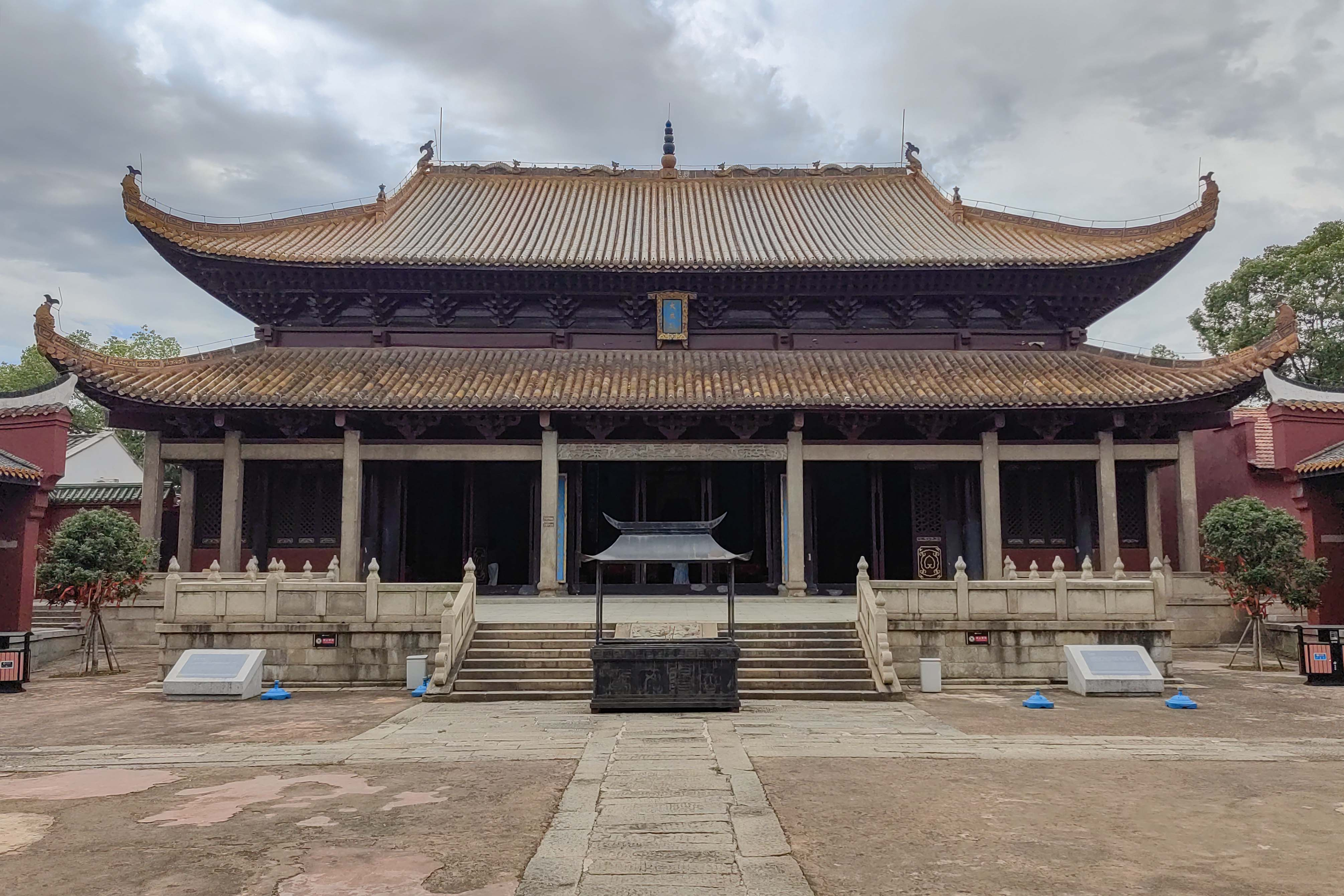
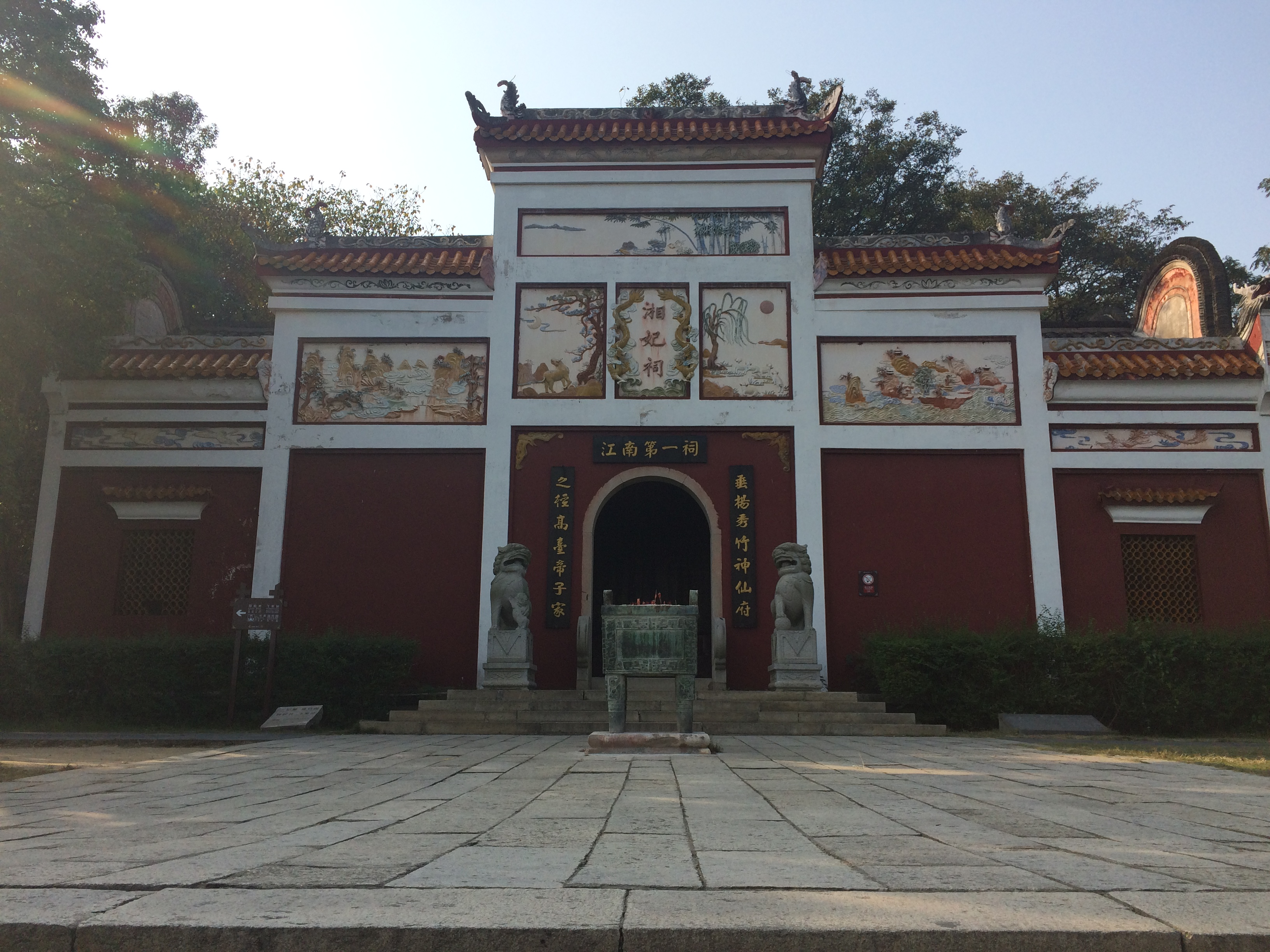
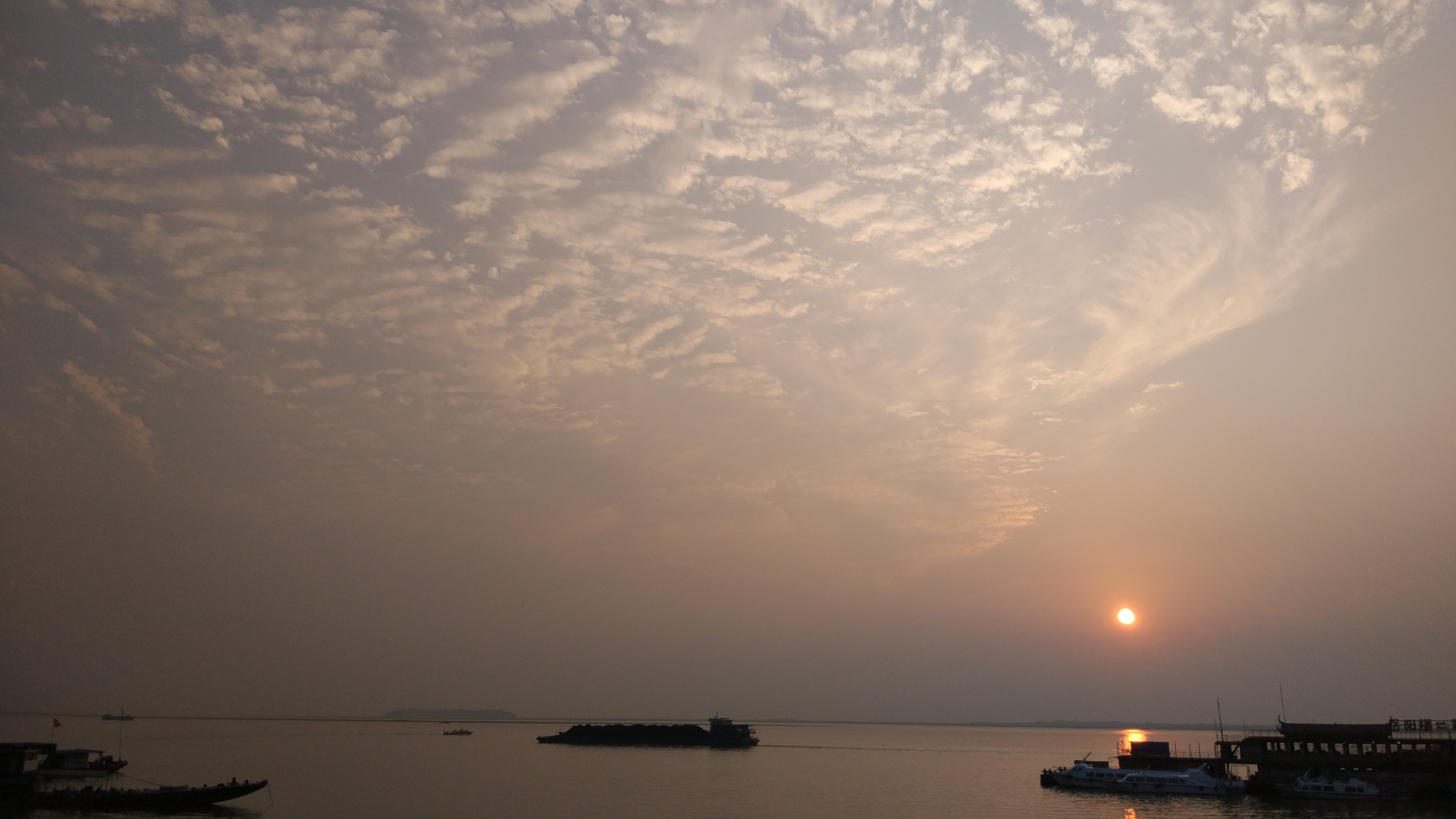
- Yueyang Tower Qu Yuan Temple Former residence of Zuo Zongtang Yueyang Temple of Confucius Junshan Island Dongting Lake

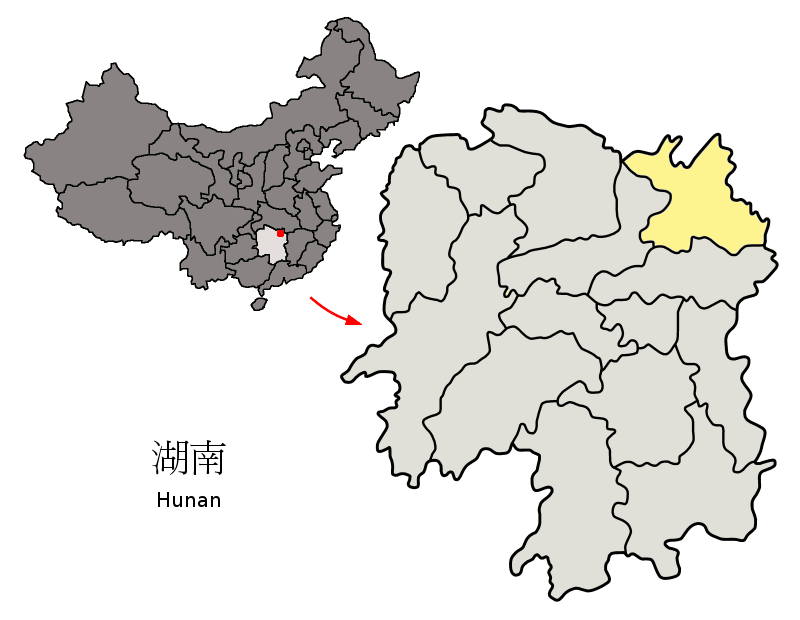
- Location of Yueyang City jurisdiction in Hunan

- Location of the city centre in Hunan
- Coordinates (Yueyang municipal government): 29°21′23″N 113°07′44″E
- Country: People's Republic of China
- Province: Hunan
- Municipal seat: Yueyanglou District

Area
  - Prefecture-level city: 14,896 km^{2} (5,751 sq mi)
  - Urban: 1,344.00 km^{2} (518.92 sq mi)
  - Metro: 721.0 km^{2} (278.4 sq mi)

Population (2020 census)
  - Prefecture-level city: 5,051,922
  - Density: 339.15/km^{2} (878.38/sq mi)
  - Urban: 1,335,692
  - Urban density: 993.818/km^{2} (2,573.98/sq mi)
  - Metro: 1,134,058
  - Metro density: 1,573/km^{2} (4,074/sq mi)

GDP
  - Prefecture-level city: CN¥ 471.1 billion US$ 69.9 billion
  - Per capita: CN¥93,895; US$13,962
- Time zone: UTC+8 (China Standard)
- ISO 3166 code: CN-HN-06
- Website: yueyang.gov.cn

Yueyang
- Traditional Chinese: 岳陽
- Simplified Chinese: 岳阳
- Postal: Yuehyang
Transcriptions
Standard Mandarin
- Hanyu Pinyin: Yuèyáng
- Wade–Giles: Yüeh^{4}-yang^{2}
- IPA: [ɥê.jǎŋ]

Yuezhou
- Chinese: 岳州
- Postal: Yochow
- Literal meaning: [Seat of] Yue Prefecture
Transcriptions
Standard Mandarin
- Hanyu Pinyin: Yuèzhōu
- Wade–Giles: Yüeh-chou

Yueyang, formerly known as Yuezhou or Baling, is a prefecture-level city on the eastern shores of Dongting Lake and the Yangtze river in the northeastern corner of Hunan Province in the People's Republic of China.

Yueyang has an administrative area of 14,896 km^{2} (5,751 sq mi) and the city proper, 304 km^{2} (117 sq mi). The population was 5,051,922 at the 2020 Chinese census whom 1,134,058 lived in the built-up (or metro) area made up of Yueyanglou District and Yunxi District, Junshan District not being conurbated. Yueyang is the only international trade port city in Hunan and a famous port city in China, at the same time, Yueyang's comprehensive economic strength ranks of Hunan second only to Changsha, the provincial capital.

The city's most famous attractions are the Yueyang Tower and Dongting Lake. The most famous food is Dongting lake silver fish (洞庭银鱼).

In 2021, the city's permanent resident population was 5,051,922, a decrease of 424,162 from the end of last year.

== Administration ==
The Yueyang prefecture is made up of six outlying districts, two special districts and the city proper. The six city districts are Huarong, Linxiang, Xiangyin, Pingjiang, Miluo and Yueyang County. The two special (smaller) districts are Junshan and Yunxi, which used to be part of Yueyang city proper but were separated into their own special districts for administrative purposes.

Districts:

- Yueyanglou District (岳阳楼区)
- Junshan District (君山区)
- Yunxi District (云溪区)

County-level City:

- Miluo City (汨罗市)
- Linxiang City (临湘市)

Counties:

- Yueyang County (岳阳县)
- Huarong County (华容县)
- Xiangyin County (湘阴县)
- Pingjiang County (平江县)

Administrative divisions of Yueyang
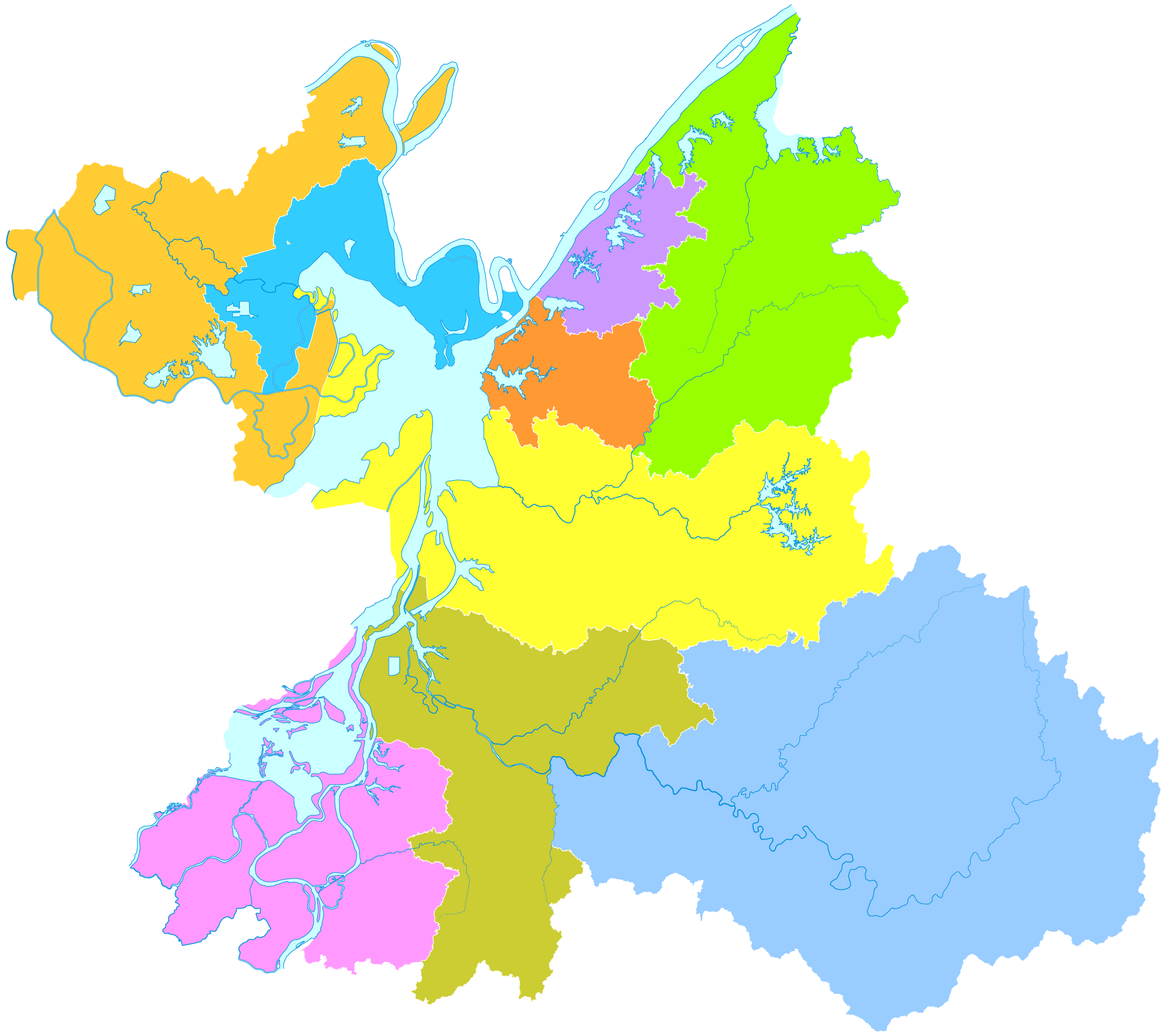

== Climate ==
Climate data for Yueyang, elevation 53 m (174 ft), (1991–2020 normals, extremes 1981–present)
Month	Jan	Feb	Mar	Apr	May	Jun	Jul	Aug	Sep	Oct	Nov	Dec	Year
Record high °C (°F)	25.9 (78.6)	28.0 (82.4)	33.0 (91.4)	33.4 (92.1)	35.7 (96.3)	36.6 (97.9)	39.2 (102.6)	37.6 (99.7)	37.2 (99.0)	34.1 (93.4)	29.5 (85.1)	23.1 (73.6)	39.2 (102.6)
Mean daily maximum °C (°F)	8.2 (46.8)	11.1 (52.0)	15.5 (59.9)	21.7 (71.1)	26.2 (79.2)	29.3 (84.7)	32.1 (89.8)	31.8 (89.2)	27.9 (82.2)	22.6 (72.7)	16.7 (62.1)	10.8 (51.4)	21.2 (70.1)
Daily mean °C (°F)	5.3 (41.5)	7.9 (46.2)	12.0 (53.6)	18.0 (64.4)	22.6 (72.7)	26.1 (79.0)	29.1 (84.4)	28.5 (83.3)	24.3 (75.7)	19.0 (66.2)	13.3 (55.9)	7.7 (45.9)	17.8 (64.1)
Mean daily minimum °C (°F)	3.1 (37.6)	5.4 (41.7)	9.4 (48.9)	15.1 (59.2)	19.8 (67.6)	23.6 (74.5)	26.7 (80.1)	26.0 (78.8)	21.7 (71.1)	16.4 (61.5)	10.7 (51.3)	5.3 (41.5)	15.3 (59.5)
Record low °C (°F)	−5.1 (22.8)	−5.4 (22.3)	−1.3 (29.7)	2.3 (36.1)	10.3 (50.5)	14.3 (57.7)	19.8 (67.6)	16.7 (62.1)	11.1 (52.0)	5.6 (42.1)	−1.5 (29.3)	−5.9 (21.4)	−5.9 (21.4)
Average precipitation mm (inches)	67.1 (2.64)	82.6 (3.25)	118.4 (4.66)	175.5 (6.91)	188.4 (7.42)	202.9 (7.99)	192.1 (7.56)	106.4 (4.19)	69.4 (2.73)	73.3 (2.89)	77.0 (3.03)	40.2 (1.58)	1,393.3 (54.85)
Average precipitation days (≥ 0.1 mm)	11.7	12.0	14.6	14.2	14.2	12.9	10.8	9.0	8.0	9.7	9.6	9.0	135.7
Average snowy days	4.5	2.5	0.7	0	0	0	0	0	0	0	0.2	1.9	9.8
Average relative humidity (%)	76	76	76	76	76	80	77	78	78	76	75	73	76
Mean monthly sunshine hours	79.8	81.5	99.8	133.3	155.6	151.7	224.7	219.0	166.1	140.8	120.7	107.4	1,680.4
Percentage possible sunshine	25	26	27	34	37	36	53	54	45	40	38	34	37
Source: China Meteorological Administration

== History ==
The area now called Yueyang has been inhabited for over 3,000 years. It was originally established as a prefecture called Hanchang (Hanchang) by Sun Wu in 210 AD during the Three Kingdoms period. It was called Ximi during the Spring and Autumn period and Warring States period under the Chu state.

Under the Song dynasty (AD 960 – AD 1279) it was heavily fortified, with walls 4 miles (6.4 km) in circumference, and became the seat of the military prefecture of Yueyang, whence its present name. During the Taiping Rebellion, its capture by the rebels in 1852 was an important stage in their advance up the Yangtze River valley to Nanjing. At the time of the foundation of the Republic of China in 1911, it became a county, taking the name Yueyang.

=== Yueyang Tower ===
Yueyang Tower is an ancient Chinese tower in Yueyang, Hunan Province, on the shore of Lake Dongting. Alongside the Pavilion of Prince Teng and Yellow Crane Tower, it is one of the Three Great Towers of Jiangnan, and attracts many tourists. It is a famous place for tourism.

== Government ==
The current CPC Party Secretary of Yueyang is Xie Weijiang and the current mayor is Li Zhi.

== Transportation ==
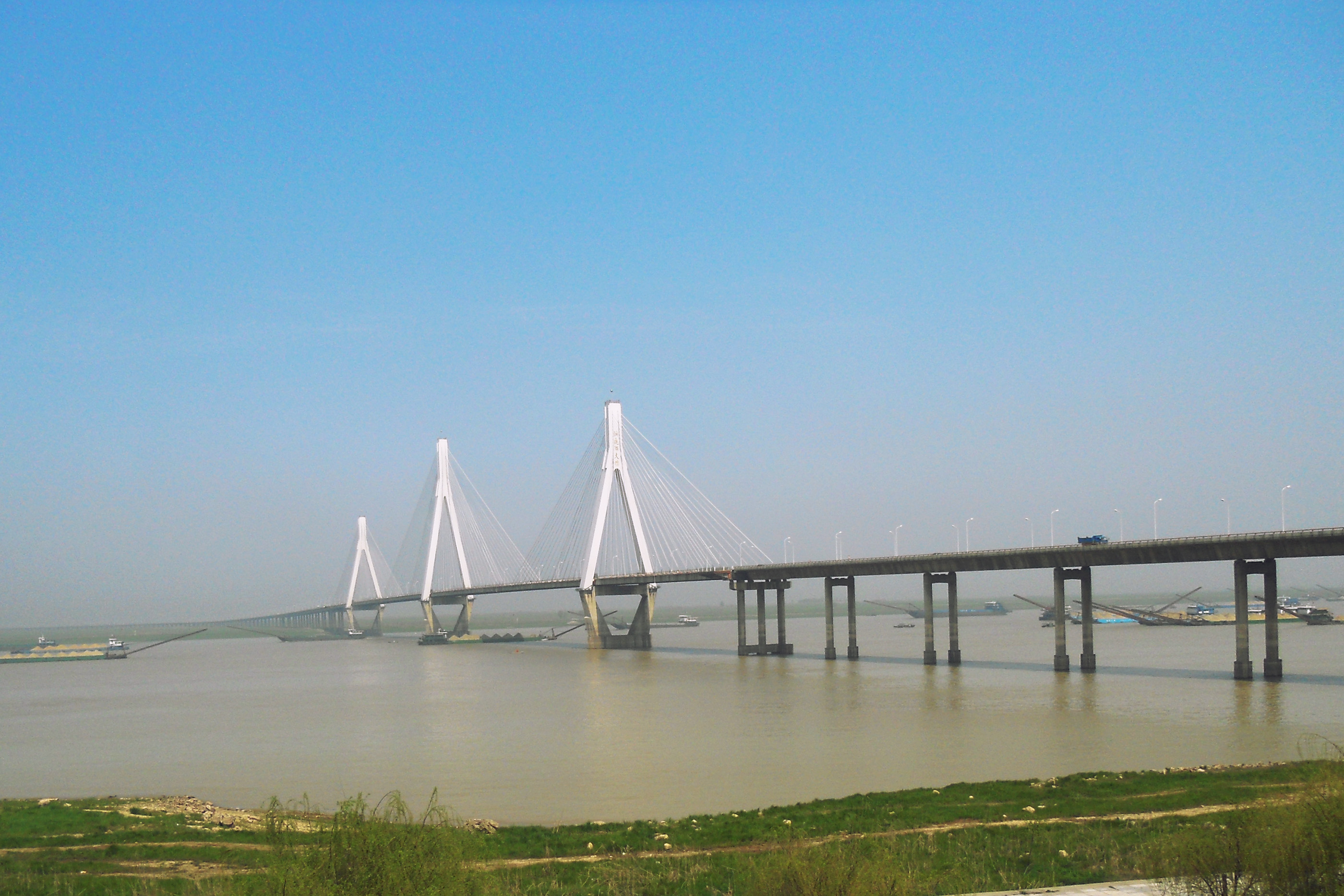
Dongting Lake Bridge

Yueyang has two Yangtze River crossings, the Jingyue Yangtze River Bridge and Dongting Lake Bridge.

The city is served by Yueyang Sanhe Airport.

== Education ==
There are a total of six colleges and polytechnic schools and several medical schools, the largest of which is Hunan Institute of Science and Technology.

Other colleges include:

- Hunan Polytechnic
- Radio and TV University Yueyang
- Yueyang University
- National Institute of Occupational Hunan
- Hunan petrochemical Vocational and Technical College
- Yueyang Vocational and Technical College

Schools:

- The No.1 Middle School of the City of Yueyang (key provincial)
- The No. 2 Middle School of the City of Yueyang
- The No. 3 Middle School of the City of Yueyang
- The No. 4 Middle School of the City of Yueyang
- The High School of Yueyang City
- The No. 6 Middle School of the City of Yueyang
- The No. 7 Middle School of the City of Yueyang (Music School of the City of Yueyang)
- The No. 8 Middle School of the City of Yueyang
- The No. 9 Middle School of the City of Yueyang
- The No. 10 Middle School of the City of Yueyang
- The No. 11 Middle School of the City of Yueyang (secondary school Yueyang Financial, in 1990 Technical School)
- The No. 12 Middle School of the City of Yueyang
- The No. 13 Middle School of the City of Yueyang
- The No. 14 Middle School of the City of Yueyang（Changlian Middle School）
- The Yuehua Middle School (key provincial)
- Middle School of the City of Miluo (key provincial)
- The No.19 Middle School of the City of Yueyang

The No.1 Middle School of Huarong (key provincial)

Secondary Vocational Schools

- Yueyang City Ahafo language
- Zhongshan Yueyang City School Finance
- Pok Man Foreign Languages School
- Huarong County Vocational Schools
- Yueyang County Vocational Schools
- Great Wall vocational schools

Primary Schools

- Yueyang Tower Primary
- Nanhu Primary
- Dongfanghong Primary
- Chaoyang Primary
- Fengshu Primary
- Qi Jia Primary

== Twin towns – sister cities ==
Yueyang is twinned with:

- Numazu, Shizuoka Prefecture, Japan (1985)
- Titusville, Florida, United States (1988)
- Castlegar, British Columbia, Canada (1992)
- Stara Zagora, Bulgaria (1994.12.04)
- City of Cockburn, Western Australia, Australia (1998)
- Juiz de Fora, Minas Gerais, Brazil (2025)
