= South Central China administrative division codes of the PRC (Division 4) =

List of administrative division codes of the People's Republic of China in Division 4 or South Central China.

The administrative division codes in this table refer to the versions of the GB/T 2260, the national standard of the PRC, published over the years, with the latest version published in 2015.

== Henan (41) ==
| 410000 | Henan Province 河南省 | | | | | | | | |
| 410100 | Zhengzhou city 郑州市 | | | | | | | | |
| 410101 | District 市辖区 | 410102 | Zhongyuan 中原区 | 410103 | Erqi 二七区 | 410104 | Guancheng 管城区 | 410105 | Jinshui 金水区 |
| 410101 | District 市辖区 | 410106 | Shangjie 上街区 | 410107 | ~~Xinmi~~ 新密区 | 410108 | Huiji 惠济区 | | |
| 410101 | District 市辖区 | | | 410111 | ~~Jinhai~~ 金海区 | 410112 | ~~Jiao~~ 郊区 | | |
| 410101 | District 市辖区 | | | | | 410120 | ~~Shi~~ 市区 | | |
| 410121 | ~~Xingyang Co.~~ 荥阳县 | 410122 | Zhongmu Co. 中牟县 | 410123 | ~~Xinzheng Co.~~ 新郑县 | 410124 | ~~Gong Co.~~ 巩县 | 410125 | ~~Dengfeng Co.~~ 登封县 |
| 410126 | ~~Mi Co.~~ 密县 | | | | | | | | |
| 410181 | Gongyi city 巩义市 | 410182 | Xingyang city 荥阳市 | 410183 | Xinmi city 新密市 | 410184 | Xinzheng city 新郑市 | 410185 | Dengfeng city 登封市 |
| 410200 | Kaifeng city 开封市 | | | | | | | | |
| 410201 | District 市辖区 | 410202 | Longting 龙亭区 | 410203 | Shunhe 顺河区 | 410204 | Gulou 鼓楼区 | 410205 | Yuwangtai 禹王台区 |
| 410201 | District 市辖区 | | | 410211 | ~~Jinming~~ 金明区 | 410212 | Xiangfu 祥符区 | | |
| 410221 | Qi Co. 杞县 | 410222 | Tongxu Co. 通许县 | 410223 | Weishi Co. 尉氏县 | 410224 | ~~Kaifeng Co.~~ 开封县 | 410225 | Lankao Co. 兰考县 |
| 410300 | Luoyang city 洛阳市 | | | | | | | | |
| 410301 | District 市辖区 | 410302 | Laocheng 老城区 | 410303 | Xigong 西工区 | 410304 | Chanhe 瀍河区 | 410305 | Jianxi 涧西区 |
| 410301 | District 市辖区 | 410306 | Jili 吉利区 | 410307 | ~~Luolong~~ 洛龙区 | | | | |
| 410301 | District 市辖区 | | | 410311 | Luolong 洛龙区 | | | | |
| 410321 | ~~Yanshi Co.~~ 偃师县 | 410322 | Mengjin Co. 孟津县 | 410323 | Xin'an Co. 新安县 | 410324 | Luanchuan Co. 栾川县 | 410325 | Song Co. 嵩县 |
| 410326 | Ruyang Co. 汝阳县 | 410327 | Yiyang Co. 宜阳县 | 410328 | Luoning Co. 洛宁县 | 410329 | Yichuan Co. 伊川县 | | |
| 410381 | Yanshi city 偃师市 | | | | | | | | |
| 410400 | Pingdingshan city 平顶山市 | | | | | | | | |
| 410401 | District 市辖区 | 410402 | Xinhua 新华区 | 410403 | Weidong 卫东区 | 410404 | Shilong 石龙区 | | |
| 410401 | District 市辖区 | | | 410411 | Zhanhe 湛河区 | 410412 | ~~Wugang~~ 舞钢区 | | |
| 410421 | Baofeng Co. 宝丰县 | 410422 | Ye Co. 叶县 | 410423 | Lushan Co. 鲁山县 | 410424 | ~~Linru Co.~~ 临汝县 | 410425 | Jia Co. 郏县 |
| 410426 | ~~Xiangcheng Co.~~ 襄城县 | | | | | | | | |
| 410481 | Wugang city 舞钢市 | 410482 | Ruzhou city 汝州市 | | | | | | |
| 410500 | Anyang city 安阳市 | | | | | | | | |
| 410501 | District 市辖区 | 410502 | Wenfeng 文峰区 | 410503 | Beiguan 北关区 | 410504 | ~~Tiexi~~ 铁西区 | 410505 | Yindu 殷都区 |
| 410501 | District 市辖区 | 410506 | Long'an 龙安区 | | | | | | |
| 410501 | District 市辖区 | | | 410511 | ~~Jiao~~ 郊区 | | | | |
| 410521 | ~~Lin Co.~~ 林县 | 410522 | Anyang Co. 安阳县 | 410523 | Tangyin Co. 汤阴县 | 410524 | ~~Qi Co.~~ 淇县 | 410525 | ~~Xun Co.~~ 浚县 |
| 410526 | Hua Co. 滑县 | 410527 | Neihuang Co. 内黄县 | | | | | | |
| 410581 | Linzhou city 林州市 | | | | | | | | |
| 410600 | Hebi city 鹤壁市 | | | | | | | | |
| 410601 | District 市辖区 | 410602 | Heshan 鹤山区 | 410603 | Shancheng 山城区 | | | | |
| 410601 | District 市辖区 | | | 410611 | Qibin 淇滨区 | | | | |
| 410621 | Xun Co. 浚县 | 410622 | Qi Co. 淇县 | | | | | | |
| 410700 | Xinxiang city 新乡市 | | | | | | | | |
| 410701 | District 市辖区 | 410702 | Hongqi 红旗区 | 410703 | Weibin 卫滨区 | 410704 | Fengquan 凤泉区 | | |
| 410701 | District 市辖区 | | | 410711 | Muye 牧野区 | | | | |
| 410721 | Xinxiang Co. 新乡县 | 410722 | ~~Ji Co.~~ 汲县 | 410723 | ~~Hui Co.~~ 辉县 | 410724 | Huojia Co. 获嘉县 | 410725 | Yuanyang Co. 原阳县 |
| 410726 | Yanjin Co. 延津县 | 410727 | Fengqiu Co. 封丘县 | 410728 | Changyuan Co. 长垣县 | | | | |
| 410781 | Weihui city 卫辉市 | 410782 | Huixian city 辉县市 | | | | | | |
| 410800 | Jiaozuo city 焦作市 | | | | | | | | |
| 410801 | District 市辖区 | 410802 | Jiefang 解放区 | 410803 | Zhongzhan 中站区 | 410804 | Macun 马村区 | | |
| 410801 | District 市辖区 | | | 410811 | Shanyang 山阳区 | | | | |
| 410821 | Xiuwu Co. 修武县 | 410822 | Bo'ai Co. 博爱县 | 410823 | Wuzhi Co. 武陟县 | 410824 | ~~Qinyang Co.~~ 沁阳县 | 410825 | Wen Co. 温县 |
| 410826 | ~~Meng Co.~~ 孟县 | 410827 | ~~Jiyuan Co.~~ 济源县 | | | | | | |
| 410881 | ~~Jiyuan city~~ 济源市 | 410882 | Qinyang city 沁阳市 | 410883 | Mengzhou city 孟州市 | | | | |
| 410900 | Puyang city 濮阳市 | | | | | | | | |
| 410901 | District 市辖区 | 410902 | Hualong 华龙区 | | | | | | |
| 410901 | District 市辖区 | | | 410911 | ~~Jiao~~ 郊区 | | | | |
| 410921 | ~~Hua Co.~~ 滑县 | 410922 | Qingfeng Co. 清丰县 | 410923 | Nanle Co. 南乐县 | 410924 | ~~Neihuang Co.~~ 内黄县 | 410925 | ~~Changyuan Co.~~ 长垣县 |
| 410926 | Fan Co. 范县 | 410927 | Taiqian Co. 台前县 | 410928 | Puyang Co. 濮阳县 | | | | |
| 411000 | Xuchang city 许昌市 | | | | | | | | |
| 411001 | District 市辖区 | 411002 | Weidu 魏都区 | 411003 | Jian'an 建安区 | | | | |
| 411021 | ~~Yu Co.~~ 禹县 | 411022 | ~~Changge Co.~~ 长葛县 | 411023 | ~~Xuchang Co.~~ 许昌县 | 411024 | Yanling Co. 鄢陵县 | 411025 | Xiangcheng Co. 襄城县 |
| 411081 | Yuzhou city 禹州市 | 411082 | Changge city 长葛市 | | | | | | |
| 411100 | Luohe city 漯河市 | | | | | | | | |
| 411101 | District 市辖区 | 411102 | Yuanhui 源汇区 | 411103 | Yancheng 郾城区 | 411104 | Shaoling 召陵区 | | |
| 411121 | Wuyang Co. 舞阳县 | 411122 | Linying Co. 临颍县 | 411123 | ~~Yancheng Co.~~ 郾城县 | | | | |
| 411200 | Sanmenxia city 三门峡市 | | | | | | | | |
| 411201 | District 市辖区 | 411202 | Hubin 湖滨区 | 411203 | Shanzhou 陕州区 | | | | |
| | | | | 411219 | ~~Yima city~~ 义马市 | | | | |
| 411221 | Mianchi Co. 渑池县 | 411222 | ~~Shan Co.~~ 陕县 | 411223 | ~~Lingbao Co.~~ 灵宝县 | 411224 | Lushi Co. 卢氏县 | | |
| 411281 | Yima city 义马市 | 411282 | Lingbao city 灵宝市 | | | | | | |
| 411300 | Nanyang city 南阳市 | | | | | | | | |
| 411301 | District 市辖区 | 411302 | Wancheng 宛城区 | 411303 | Wolong 卧龙区 | | | | |
| 411321 | Nanzhao Co. 南召县 | 411322 | Fangcheng Co. 方城县 | 411323 | Xixia Co. 西峡县 | 411324 | Zhenping Co. 镇平县 | 411325 | Neixiang Co. 内乡县 |
| 411326 | Xichuan Co. 淅川县 | 411327 | Sheqi Co. 社旗县 | 411328 | Tanghe Co. 唐河县 | 411329 | Xinye Co. 新野县 | 411330 | Tongbai Co. 桐柏县 |
| 411381 | Dengzhou city 邓州市 | | | | | | | | |
| 411400 | Shangqiu city 商丘市 | | | | | | | | |
| 411401 | District 市辖区 | 411402 | Liangyuan 梁园区 | 411403 | Suiyang 睢阳区 | | | | |
| 41140021 | Minquan Co. 民权县 | 41140022 | Sui Co. 睢县 | 41140023 | Ningling Co. 宁陵县 | 41140024 | Zhecheng Co. 柘城县 | 41140025 | Yucheng Co. 虞城县 |
| 41140026 | Xiayi Co. 夏邑县 | | | | | | | | |
| 41140081 | Yongcheng city 永城市 | | | | | | | | |
| 411500 | Xinyang city 信阳市 | | | | | | | | |
| 411501 | District 市辖区 | 411502 | Shihe 浉河区 | 411503 | Pingqiao 平桥区 | | | | |
| 411521 | Luoshan Co. 罗山县 | 411522 | Guangshan Co. 光山县 | 411523 | Xin Co. 新县 | 411524 | Shangcheng Co. 商城县 | 411525 | Gushi Co. 固始县 |
| 411526 | Huangchuan Co. 潢川县 | 411527 | Huaibin Co. 淮滨县 | 411528 | Xi Co. 息县 | | | | |
| 411600 | Zhoukou city 周口市 | | | | | | | | |
| 411601 | District 市辖区 | 411602 | Chuanhui 川汇区 | | | | | | |
| 411621 | Fugou Co. 扶沟县 | 411622 | Xihua Co. 西华县 | 411623 | Shangshui Co. 商水县 | 411624 | Shenqiu Co. 沈丘县 | 411625 | Dancheng Co. 郸城县 |
| 411626 | Huaiyang Co. 淮阳县 | 411627 | Taikang Co. 太康县 | 411628 | Luyi Co. 鹿邑县 | | | | |
| 411681 | Xiangcheng city 项城市 | | | | | | | | |
| 411700 | Zhumadian city 驻马店市 | | | | | | | | |
| 411701 | District 市辖区 | 411702 | Yicheng 驿城区 | | | | | | |
| 411721 | Xiping Co. 西平县 | 411722 | Shangcai Co. 上蔡县 | 411723 | Pingyu Co. 平舆县 | 411724 | Zhengyang Co. 正阳县 | 411725 | Queshan Co. 确山县 |
| 411726 | Biyang Co. 泌阳县 | 411727 | Runan Co. 汝南县 | 411728 | Suiping Co. 遂平县 | 411729 | Xincai Co. 新蔡县 | | |
| 412100 | ~~Anyang Prefecture~~ 安阳地区 | | | | | | | | |
| 412200 | ~~Xinxiang Prefecture~~ 新乡地区 | | | | | | | | |
| 412300 | ~~Shangqiu Prefecture~~ 商丘地区 | | | | | | | | |
| 412400 | ~~Kaifeng Prefecture~~ 开封地区 | | | | | | | | |
| 412500 | ~~Luoyang Prefecture~~ 洛阳地区 | | | | | | | | |
| 412600 | ~~Xuchang Prefecture~~ 许昌地区 | | | | | | | | |
| 412700 | ~~Zhoukou Prefecture~~ 周口地区 | | | | | | | | |
| 412800 | ~~Zhumadian Prefecture~~ 驻马店地区 | | | | | | | | |
| 412900 | ~~Nanyang Prefecture~~ 南阳地区 | | | | | | | | |
| 413000 | ~~Xinyang Prefecture~~ 信阳地区 | | | | | | | | |
| 419000 | Direct administration 省直辖 | | | | | | | | |
| 419001 | Jiyuan city 济源市 | 419002 | ~~Ruzhou city~~ 汝州市 | 419003 | ~~Jiyuan city~~ 济源市 | 419004 | ~~Yuzhou city~~ 禹州市 | 419005 | ~~Weihui city~~ 卫辉市 |
| 419006 | ~~Huixian city~~ 辉县市 | | | | | | | | |

== Hubei (42) ==
| 420000 | Hubei Province 湖北省 | | | | | | | | |
| 420100 | Wuhan city 武汉市 | | | | | | | | |
| 420101 | District 市辖区 | 420102 | Jiang'an 江岸区 | 420103 | Jianghan 江汉区 | 420104 | Qiaokou 硚口区 | 420105 | Hanyang 汉阳区 |
| 420101 | District 市辖区 | 420106 | Wuchang 武昌区 | 420107 | Qingshan 青山区 | | | | |
| 420101 | District 市辖区 | | | 420111 | Hongshan 洪山区 | 420112 | Dongxihu 东西湖区 | 420113 | Hannan 汉南区 |
| 420101 | District 市辖区 | 420114 | Caidian 蔡甸区 | 420115 | Jiangxia 江夏区 | 420116 | Huangpi 黄陂区 | 420117 | Xinzhou 新洲区 |
| 420101 | District 市辖区 | | | | | 420120 | ~~Shi~~ 市区 | | |
| 420121 | ~~Hanyang Co.~~ 汉阳县 | 420122 | ~~Wuchang Co.~~ 武昌县 | 420123 | ~~Huangpi Co.~~ 黄陂县 | 420124 | ~~Xinzhou Co.~~ 新洲县 | | |
| 420200 | Huangshi city 黄石市 | | | | | | | | |
| 420201 | District 市辖区 | 420202 | Huangshigang 黄石港区 | 420203 | Xisaishan 西塞山区 | 420204 | Xialu 下陆区 | 420205 | Tieshan 铁山区 |
| 420201 | District 市辖区 | | | 420211 | ~~Jiao~~ 郊区 | | | | |
| 420201 | District 市辖区 | | | | | 420220 | ~~Shi~~ 市区 | | |
| 420221 | ~~Daye Co.~~ 大冶县 | 420222 | Yangxin Co. 阳新县 | | | | | | |
| 420281 | Daye city 大冶市 | | | | | | | | |
| 420300 | Shiyan city 十堰市 | | | | | | | | |
| 420301 | District 市辖区 | 420302 | Maojian 茅箭区 | 420303 | Zhangwan 张湾区 | 420304 | Yunyang 郧阳区 | | |
| 420321 | ~~Yun Co.~~ 郧县 | 420322 | Yunxi Co. 郧西县 | 420323 | Zhushan Co. 竹山县 | 420324 | Zhuxi Co. 竹溪县 | 420325 | Fang Co. 房县 |
| 420381 | Danjiangkou city 丹江口市 | | | | | | | | |
| 420400 | ~~Shashi city~~ 沙市市 | | | | | | | | |
| 420401 | ~~District~~ 市辖区 | | | | | | | | |
| 420500 | Yichang city 宜昌市 | | | | | | | | |
| 420501 | District 市辖区 | 420502 | Xiling 西陵区 | 420503 | Wujiagang 伍家岗区 | 420504 | Dianjun 点军区 | 420505 | Xiaoting 猇亭区 |
| 420501 | District 市辖区 | 420506 | Yiling 夷陵区 | | | | | | |
| 420521 | ~~Yichang Co.~~ 宜昌县 | | | 420523 | ~~Zhijiang Co.~~ 枝江县 | | | 420525 | Yuan'an Co. 远安县 |
| 420526 | Xingshan Co. 兴山县 | 420527 | Zigui Co. 秭归县 | 420528 | Changyang Co. 长阳县 | 420529 | Wufeng Co. 五峰县 | | |
| 420581 | Yidu city 宜都市 | 420582 | Dangyang city 当阳市 | 420583 | Zhijiang city 枝江市 | | | | |
| 420600 | Xiangyang city 襄阳市 | | | | | | | | |
| 420601 | District 市辖区 | 420602 | Xiangcheng 襄城区 | 420603 | ~~Fandong~~ 樊东区 | 420604 | ~~Fanxi~~ 樊西区 | 420605 | ~~Jiao~~ 郊区 |
| 420601 | District 市辖区 | 420606 | Fancheng 樊城区 | 420607 | Xiangzhou 襄州区 | | | | |
| | | | | 420619 | ~~Suizhou city~~ 随州市 | 420620 | ~~Laohekou city~~ 老河口市 | | |
| 420621 | ~~Xiangyang Co.~~ 襄阳县 | 420622 | ~~Zaoyang Co.~~ 枣阳县 | 420623 | ~~Yicheng Co.~~ 宜城县 | 420624 | Nanzhang Co. 南漳县 | 420625 | Gucheng Co. 谷城县 |
| 420626 | Baokang Co. 保康县 | | | | | | | | |
| 420681 | ~~Suizhou city~~ 随州市 | 420682 | Laohekou city 老河口市 | 420683 | Zaoyang city 枣阳市 | 420684 | Yicheng city 宜城市 | | |
| 420700 | Ezhou city 鄂州市 | | | | | | | | |
| 420701 | District 市辖区 | 420702 | Liangzihu 梁子湖区 | 420703 | Huarong 华容区 | 420704 | Echeng 鄂城区 | | |
| 420701 | District 市辖区 | | | | | | | 420709 | ~~Huangzhou~~ 黄州区 |
| 420800 | Jingmen city 荆门市 | | | | | | | | |
| 420801 | District 市辖区 | 420802 | Dongbao 东宝区 | 420803 | ~~Shayang~~ 沙洋区 | 420804 | Duodao 掇刀区 | | |
| 420821 | ~~Jingshan Co.~~ 京山县 | 420822 | Shayang Co. 沙洋县 | | | | | | |
| 420881 | Zhongxiang city 钟祥市 | 420882 | Jingshan city 京山市 | | | | | | |
| 420900 | Xiaogan city 孝感市 | | | | | | | | |
| 420901 | District 市辖区 | 420902 | Xiaonan 孝南区 | | | | | | |
| 420921 | Xiaochang Co. 孝昌县 | 420922 | Dawu Co. 大悟县 | 420923 | Yunmeng Co. 云梦县 | 420924 | ~~Hanchuan Co.~~ 汉川县 | | |
| 420981 | Yingcheng city 应城市 | 420982 | Anlu city 安陆市 | 420983 | ~~Guangshui city~~ 广水市 | 420984 | Hanchuan city 汉川市 | | |
| 421000 | Jingzhou city 荆州市 | | | | | | | | |
| 421001 | District 市辖区 | 421002 | Shashi 沙市区 | 421003 | Jingzhou 荆州区 | 421004 | ~~Jiangling~~ 江陵区 | | |
| 421021 | ~~Songzi Co.~~ 松滋县 | 421022 | Gong'an Co. 公安县 | 421023 | Jianli Co. 监利县 | 421024 | Jiangling Co. 江陵县 | | |
| 421081 | Shishou city 石首市 | 421082 | ~~Shishou city~~ 石首市 | 421083 | Honghu city 洪湖市 | 421084 | ~~Tianmen city~~ 天门市 | 421085 | ~~Qianjiang city~~ 潜江市 |
| 421086 | ~~Zhongxiang city~~ 钟祥市 | 421087 | Songzi city 松滋市 | | | | | | |
| 421100 | Huanggang city 黄冈市 | | | | | | | | |
| 421101 | District 市辖区 | 421102 | Huangzhou 黄州区 | | | | | | |
| 421121 | Tuanfeng Co. 团风县 | 421122 | Hong'an Co. 红安县 | 421123 | Luotian Co. 罗田县 | 421124 | Yingshan Co. 英山县 | 421125 | Xishui Co. 浠水县 |
| 421126 | Qichun Co. 蕲春县 | 421127 | Huangmei Co. 黄梅县 | | | | | | |
| 421181 | Macheng city 麻城市 | 421182 | Wuxue city 武穴市 | | | | | | |
| 421200 | Xianning city 咸宁市 | | | | | | | | |
| 421201 | District 市辖区 | 421202 | Xian'an 咸安区 | | | | | | |
| 421221 | Jiayu Co. 嘉鱼县 | 421222 | Tongcheng Co. 通城县 | 421223 | Chongyang Co. 崇阳县 | 421224 | Tongshan Co. 通山县 | | |
| 421281 | Chibi city 赤壁市 | | | | | | | | |
| 421300 | Suizhou city 随州市 | | | | | | | | |
| 421301 | District 市辖区 | 421302 | ~~Zengdu~~ 曾都区 | 421303 | Zengdu 曾都区 | | | | |
| 421321 | Sui Co. 随县 | | | | | | | | |
| 421381 | Guangshui city 广水市 | | | | | | | | |
| 422100 | ~~Huanggang Prefecture~~ 黄冈地区 | | | | | | | | |
| 422200 | ~~Xiaogan Prefecture~~ 孝感地区 | | | | | | | | |
| 422300 | ~~Xianning Prefecture~~ 咸宁地区 | | | | | | | | |
| 422400 | ~~Jingzhou Prefecture~~ 荆州地区 | | | | | | | | |
| 422500 | ~~Xiangyang Prefecture~~ 襄阳地区 | | | | | | | | |
| 422600 | ~~Yunyang Prefecture~~ 郧阳地区 | | | | | | | | |
| 422700 | ~~Yichang Prefecture~~ 宜昌地区 | | | | | | | | |
| 422800 | Enshi Prefecture 恩施州 | | | | | | | | |
| 422801 | Enshi city 恩施市 | 422802 | Lichuan city 利川市 | | | | | | |
| 422821 | ~~Enshi Co.~~ 恩施县 | 422822 | Jianshi Co. 建始县 | 422823 | Badong Co. 巴东县 | 422824 | ~~Lichuan Co.~~ 利川县 | 422825 | Xuan'en Co. 宣恩县 |
| 422826 | Xianfeng Co. 咸丰县 | 422827 | Laifeng Co. 来凤县 | 422828 | Hefeng Co. 鹤峰县 | | | | |
| 422900 | ~~Direct administration~~ 省直辖 | | | | | | | | |
| 422901 | ~~Shennongjia FD~~ 神农架林区 | | | | | | | | |
| 429000 | Direct administration 省直辖 | | | | | | | | |
| 429001 | ~~Suizhou city~~ 随州市 | 429002 | ~~Laohekou city~~ 老河口市 | 429003 | ~~Zaoyang city~~ 枣阳市 | 429004 | Xiantao city 仙桃市 | 429005 | Qianjiang city 潜江市 |
| | | 429006 | Tianmen city 天门市 | | | | | | |
| 429021 | Shennongjia FD 神农架林区 | | | | | | | | |

== Hunan (43) ==
| 430000 | Hunan Province 湖南省 | | | | | | | | |
| 430100 | Changsha city 长沙市 | | | | | | | | |
| 430101 | District 市辖区 | 430102 | Furong 芙蓉区 | 430103 | Tianxin 天心区 | 430104 | Yuelu 岳麓区 | 430105 | Kaifu 开福区 |
| 430101 | District 市辖区 | | | 430111 | Yuhua 雨花区 | 430112 | Wangcheng 望城区 | | |
| 430101 | District 市辖区 | | | | | 430120 | ~~Shi~~ 市区 | | |
| 430121 | Changsha Co. 长沙县 | 430122 | ~~Wangcheng Co.~~ 望城县 | 430123 | ~~Liuyang Co.~~ 浏阳县 | 430124 | ~~Ningxiang Co.~~ 宁乡县 | | |
| 430181 | Liuyang city 浏阳市 | 430182 | Ningxiang city 宁乡市 | | | | | | |
| 430200 | Zhuzhou city 株洲市 | | | | | | | | |
| 430201 | District 市辖区 | 430202 | Hetang 荷塘区 | 430203 | Lusong 芦淞区 | 430204 | Shifeng 石峰区 | | |
| 430201 | District 市辖区 | | | 430211 | Tianyuan 天元区 | | | | |
| 430201 | District 市辖区 | | | 430219 | ~~Liling city~~ 醴陵市 | 430220 | ~~Shi~~ 市区 | | |
| 430221 | Zhuzhou Co. 株洲县 | 430222 | ~~Liling Co.~~ 醴陵县 | 430223 | You Co. 攸县 | 430224 | Chaling Co. 茶陵县 | 430225 | Yanling Co. 炎陵县 |
| 430281 | Liling city 醴陵市 | | | | | | | | |
| 430300 | Xiangtan city 湘潭市 | | | | | | | | |
| 430301 | District 市辖区 | 430302 | Yuhu 雨湖区 | 430303 | ~~Xiangjiang~~ 湘江区 | 430304 | Yuetang 岳塘区 | 430305 | ~~Bantang~~ 板塘区 |
| 430301 | District 市辖区 | 430306 | ~~Shaoshan~~ 韶山区 | | | | | | |
| 430301 | District 市辖区 | | | 430311 | ~~Jiao~~ 郊区 | 430312 | ~~Shaoshan~~ 韶山区 | | |
| 430321 | Xiangtan Co. 湘潭县 | 430322 | ~~Xiangxiang Co.~~ 湘乡县 | | | | | | |
| 430381 | Xiangxiang city 湘乡市 | 430382 | Shaoshan city 韶山市 | | | | | | |
| 430400 | Hengyang city 衡阳市 | | | | | | | | |
| 430401 | District 市辖区 | 430402 | ~~Jiangdong~~ 江东区 | 430403 | ~~Chengnan~~ 城南区 | 430404 | ~~Chengbei~~ 城北区 | 430405 | Zhuhui 珠晖区 |
| 430401 | District 市辖区 | 430406 | Yanfeng 雁峰区 | 430407 | Shigu 石鼓区 | 430408 | Zhengxiang 蒸湘区 | | |
| 430401 | District 市辖区 | | | 430411 | ~~Jiao~~ 郊区 | 430412 | Nanyue 南岳区 | | |
| 430421 | Hengyang Co. 衡阳县 | 430422 | Hengnan Co. 衡南县 | 430423 | Hengshan Co. 衡山县 | 430424 | Hengdong Co. 衡东县 | 430425 | Changning Co. 常宁县 |
| 430426 | Qidong Co. 祁东县 | 430427 | ~~Leiyang Co.~~ 耒阳县 | | | | | | |
| 430481 | Leiyang city 耒阳市 | 430482 | Changning city 常宁市 | | | | | | |
| 430500 | Shaoyang city 邵阳市 | | | | | | | | |
| 430501 | District 市辖区 | 430502 | Shuangqing 双清区 | 430503 | Daxiang 大祥区 | 430504 | ~~Qiaotou~~ 桥头区 | | |
| 430501 | District 市辖区 | | | 430511 | Beita 北塔区 | | | | |
| 430521 | Shaodong Co. 邵东县 | 430522 | Xinshao Co. 新邵县 | 430523 | Shaoyang Co. 邵阳县 | 430524 | Longhui Co. 隆回县 | 430525 | Dongkou Co. 洞口县 |
| 430526 | ~~Wugang Co.~~ 武冈县 | 430527 | Suining Co. 绥宁县 | 430528 | Xinning Co. 新宁县 | 430529 | Chengbu Co. 城步县 | | |
| 430581 | Wugang city 武冈市 | | | | | | | | |
| 430600 | Yueyang city 岳阳市 | | | | | | | | |
| 430601 | District 市辖区 | 430602 | Yueyanglou 岳阳楼区 | 430603 | Yunxi 云溪区 | | | | |
| 430601 | District 市辖区 | | | 430611 | Junshan 君山区 | | | | |
| 430621 | Yueyang Co. 岳阳县 | 430622 | ~~Linxiang Co.~~ 临湘县 | 430623 | Huarong Co. 华容县 | 430624 | Xiangyin Co. 湘阴县 | 430625 | ~~Miluo Co.~~ 汨罗县 |
| 430626 | Pingjiang Co. 平江县 | | | | | | | | |
| 430681 | Miluo city 汨罗市 | 430682 | Linxiang city 临湘市 | | | | | | |
| 430700 | Changde city 常德市 | | | | | | | | |
| 430701 | District 市辖区 | 430702 | Wuling 武陵区 | 430703 | Dingcheng 鼎城区 | | | | |
| 430721 | Anxiang Co. 安乡县 | 430722 | Hanshou Co. 汉寿县 | 430723 | Li Co. 澧县 | 430724 | Linli Co. 临澧县 | 430725 | Taoyuan Co. 桃源县 |
| 430726 | Shimen Co. 石门县 | 430727 | ~~Cili Co.~~ 慈利县 | | | | | | |
| 430786 | Jinshi city 津市市 | | | | | | | | |
| 430800 | Zhangjiajie city 张家界市 | | | | | | | | |
| 430801 | District 市辖区 | 430802 | Yongding 永定区 | | | | | | |
| 430801 | District 市辖区 | | | 430811 | Wulingyuan 武陵源区 | | | | |
| 430821 | Cili Co. 慈利县 | 430982 | Sangzhi Co. 桑植县 | | | | | | |
| 430900 | Yiyang city 益阳市 | | | | | | | | |
| 430901 | District 市辖区 | 430902 | Ziyang 资阳区 | 430903 | Heshan 赫山区 | | | | |
| 430921 | Nan Co. 南县 | 430922 | Taojiang Co. 桃江县 | 430923 | Anhua Co. 安化县 | | | | |
| 430981 | Yuanjiang city 沅江市 | | | | | | | | |
| 431000 | Chenzhou city 郴州市 | | | | | | | | |
| 431001 | District 市辖区 | 431002 | Beihu 北湖区 | 431003 | Suxian 苏仙区 | | | | |
| 431021 | Guiyang Co. 桂阳县 | 431022 | Yizhang Co. 宜章县 | 431023 | Yongxing Co. 永兴县 | 431024 | Jiahe Co. 嘉禾县 | 431025 | Linwu Co. 临武县 |
| 431026 | Rucheng Co. 汝城县 | 431027 | Guidong Co. 桂东县 | 431028 | Anren Co. 安仁县 | | | | |
| 431081 | Zixing city 资兴市 | | | | | | | | |
| 431100 | Yongzhou city 永州市 | | | | | | | | |
| 431101 | District 市辖区 | 431102 | Lingling 零陵区 | 431103 | Lengshuitan 冷水滩区 | | | | |
| 431121 | Qiyang Co. 祁阳县 | 431122 | Dong'an Co. 东安县 | 431123 | Shuangpai Co. 双牌县 | 431124 | Dao Co. 道县 | 431125 | Jiangyong Co. 江永县 |
| 431126 | Ningyuan Co. 宁远县 | 431127 | Lanshan Co. 蓝山县 | 431128 | Xintian Co. 新田县 | 431129 | Jianghua Co. 江华县 | | |
| 431200 | Huaihua city 怀化市 | | | | | | | | |
| 431201 | District 市辖区 | 431202 | Hecheng 鹤城区 | | | | | | |
| 431221 | Zhongfang Co. 中方县 | 431222 | Yuanling Co. 沅陵县 | 431223 | Chenxi Co. 辰溪县 | 431224 | Xupu Co. 溆浦县 | 431225 | Huitong Co. 会同县 |
| 431226 | Mayang Co. 麻阳县 | 431227 | Xinhuang Co. 新晃县 | 431228 | Zhijiang Co. 芷江县 | 431229 | Jingzhou Co. 靖州县 | 431230 | Tongdao Co. 通道县 |
| 431281 | Hongjiang city 洪江市 | | | | | | | | |
| 431300 | Loudi city 娄底市 | | | | | | | | |
| 431301 | District 市辖区 | 431302 | Louxing 娄星区 | | | | | | |
| 431321 | Shuangfeng Co. 双峰县 | 431322 | Xinhua Co. 新化县 | | | | | | |
| 431381 | Lengshuijiang city 冷水江市 | 431382 | Lianyuan city 涟源市 | | | | | | |
| 432100 | ~~Xiangtan Prefecture~~ 湘潭地区 | | | | | | | | |
| 432200 | ~~Yueyang Prefecture~~ 岳阳地区 | | | | | | | | |
| 432300 | ~~Yiyang Prefecture~~ 益阳地区 | | | | | | | | |
| 432400 | ~~Changde Prefecture~~ 常德地区 | | | | | | | | |
| 432500 | ~~Loudi Prefecture~~ 娄底地区 | | | | | | | | |
| 432600 | ~~Shaoyang Prefecture~~ 邵阳地区 | | | | | | | | |
| 432700 | ~~Hengyang Prefecture~~ 衡阳地区 | | | | | | | | |
| 432800 | ~~Chenzhou Prefecture~~ 郴州地区 | | | | | | | | |
| 432900 | ~~Lingling Prefecture~~ 零陵地区 | | | | | | | | |
| 433000 | ~~Huaihua Prefecture~~ 怀化地区 | | | | | | | | |
| 433100 | Xiangxi Prefecture 湘西州 | | | | | | | | |
| 433101 | Jishou city 吉首市 | 433102 | ~~Dayong city~~ 大庸市 | | | | | | |
| 433121 | ~~Jishou Co.~~ 吉首县 | 433122 | Luxi Co. 泸溪县 | 433123 | Fenghuang Co. 凤凰县 | 433124 | Huayuan Co. 花垣县 | 433125 | Baojing Co. 保靖县 |
| 433126 | Guzhang Co. 古丈县 | 433127 | Yongshun Co. 永顺县 | 433128 | ~~Dayong Co.~~ 大庸县 | 433129 | ~~Sangzhi Co.~~ 桑植县 | 433130 | Longshan Co. 龙山县 |
| 439000 | ~~Direct administration~~ 省直辖 | | | | | | | | |
| 439001 | ~~Liling city~~ 醴陵市 | 439002 | ~~Xiangxiang city~~ 湘乡市 | 439003 | ~~Leiyang city~~ 耒阳市 | 439004 | ~~Miluo City~~ 汨罗市 | 439005 | ~~Jinshi city~~ 津市市 |

== Guangdong (44) ==
| 440000 | Guangdong Province 广东省 | | | | | | | | |
| 440100 | Guangzhou city 广州市 | | | | | | | | |
| 440101 | District 市辖区 | 440102 | ~~Dongshan~~ 东山区 | 440103 | Liwan 荔湾区 | 440104 | Yuexiu 越秀区 | 440105 | Haizhu 海珠区 |
| 440101 | District 市辖区 | 440106 | Tianhe 天河区 | 440107 | ~~Fangcun~~ 芳村区 | | | | |
| 440101 | District 市辖区 | | | 440111 | Baiyun 白云区 | 440112 | Huangpu 黄埔区 | 440113 | Panyu 番禺区 |
| 440101 | District 市辖区 | 440114 | Huadu 花都区 | 440115 | Nansha 南沙区 | 440116 | ~~Luogang~~ 萝岗区 | 440117 | Conghua 从化区 |
| 440101 | District 市辖区 | 440118 | Zengcheng 增城区 | | | 440120 | ~~Shi~~ 市区 | | |
| 440121 | ~~Hua Co.~~ 花县 | 440122 | ~~Conghua Co.~~ 从化县 | 440123 | ~~Xinfeng Co.~~ 新丰县 | 440124 | ~~Longmen Co.~~ 龙门县 | 440125 | ~~Zengcheng Co.~~ 增城县 |
| 440126 | ~~Panyu Co.~~ 番禺县 | 440127 | ~~Qingyuan Co.~~ 清远县 | 440128 | ~~Fogang Co.~~ 佛冈县 | | | | |
| 440181 | ~~Panyu city~~ 番禺市 | 440182 | ~~Huadu city~~ 花都市 | 440183 | ~~Zengcheng city~~ 增城市 | 440184 | ~~Conghua city~~ 从化市 | | |
| 440200 | Shaoguan city 韶关市 | | | | | | | | |
| 440201 | District 市辖区 | 440202 | ~~Beijiang~~ 北江区 | 440203 | Wujiang 武江区 | 440204 | Zhenjiang 浈江区 | 440205 | Qujiang 曲江区 |
| 440201 | District 市辖区 | | | | | 440220 | ~~Shi~~ 市区 | | |
| 440221 | ~~Qujiang Co.~~ 曲江县 | 440222 | Shixing Co. 始兴县 | 440223 | ~~Nanxiong Co.~~ 南雄县 | 440224 | Renhua Co. 仁化县 | 440225 | ~~lechang Co.~~ 乐昌县 |
| 440226 | ~~Lian Co.~~ 连县 | 440227 | ~~Yangshan Co.~~ 阳山县 | 440228 | ~~Yingde Co.~~ 英德县 | 440229 | Wengyuan Co. 翁源县 | 440230 | ~~Lianshan Co.~~ 连山县 |
| 440231 | ~~Liannan Co.~~ 连南县 | 440232 | Ruyuan Co. 乳源县 | 440233 | Xinfeng Co. 新丰县 | | | | |
| 440281 | Lechang city 乐昌市 | 440282 | Nanxiong city 南雄市 | | | | | | |
| 440300 | Shenzhen city 深圳市 | | | | | | | | |
| 440301 | District 市辖区 | 440302 | ~~Yantian~~ 盐田区 | 440303 | Luohu 罗湖区 | 440304 | Futian 福田区 | 440305 | Nanshan 南山区 |
| 440301 | District 市辖区 | 440306 | Bao'an 宝安区 | 440307 | Longgang 龙岗区 | 440308 | Yantian 盐田区 | 440309 | Longhua 龙华区 |
| 440301 | District 市辖区 | 440310 | Pingshan 坪山区 | 440311 | Guangming 光明区 | | Dapeng 大鹏新区 | | |
| 440301 | District 市辖区 | | | | | 440320 | ~~Shi~~ 市区 | | |
| 440321 | ~~Bao'an Co.~~ 宝安县 | | | | | | | | |
| 440400 | Zhuhai city 珠海市 | | | | | | | | |
| 440401 | District 市辖区 | 440402 | Xiangzhou 香洲区 | 440403 | Doumen 斗门区 | 440404 | Jinwan 金湾区 | | Hengqin 横琴新区 |
| 440421 | ~~Doumen Co.~~ 斗门县 | | | | | | | | |
| 440500 | Shantou city 汕头市 | | | | | | | | |
| 440501 | District 市辖区 | 440502 | ~~Tongping~~ 同平区 | 440503 | ~~Anping~~ 安平区 | 440504 | ~~Gongyuan~~ 公园区 | 440505 | ~~Jinsha~~ 金沙区 |
| 440501 | District 市辖区 | 440506 | ~~Dahao~~ 达濠区 | 440507 | Longhu 龙湖区 | 440508 | ~~Jinyuan~~ 金园区 | 440509 | ~~Shengping~~ 升平区 |
| 440501 | District 市辖区 | 440510 | ~~Hepu~~ 河浦区 | 440511 | Jinping 金平区 | 440512 | Haojiang 濠江区 | 440513 | Chaoyang 潮阳区 |
| 440501 | District 市辖区 | 440514 | Chaonan 潮南区 | 440515 | Chenghai 澄海区 | | | | |
| | | | | | | 440520 | ~~Chaozhou city~~ 潮州市 | | |
| 440521 | ~~Chenghai Co.~~ 澄海县 | 440522 | ~~Raoping Co.~~ 饶平县 | 440523 | Nan'ao Co. 南澳县 | 440524 | ~~Chaoyang Co.~~ 潮阳县 | 440525 | ~~Jieyang Co.~~ 揭阳县 |
| 440526 | ~~Jiexi Co.~~ 揭西县 | 440527 | ~~Puning Co.~~ 普宁县 | 440528 | ~~Huilai Co.~~ 惠来县 | | | | |
| 440581 | ~~Chaozhou city~~ 潮州市 | 440582 | ~~Chaoyang city~~ 潮阳市 | 440583 | ~~Chenghai city~~ 澄海市 | | | | |
| 440600 | Foshan city 佛山市 | | | | | | | | |
| 440601 | District 市辖区 | 440602 | ~~Cheng~~ 城区 | 440603 | ~~Shiwan~~ 石湾区 | 440604 | Chancheng 禅城区 | 440605 | Nanhai 南海区 |
| 440601 | District 市辖区 | 440606 | Shunde 顺德区 | 440607 | Sanshui 三水区 | 440608 | Gaoming 高明区 | | |
| | | | | | | 440620 | ~~Zhongshan city~~ 中山市 | | |
| 440621 | ~~Sanshui Co.~~ 三水县 | 440622 | ~~Nanhai Co.~~ 南海县 | 440623 | ~~Shunde Co.~~ 顺德县 | 440624 | ~~Gaoming Co.~~ 高明县 | | |
| 440681 | ~~Shunde city~~ 顺德市 | 440682 | ~~Nanhai city~~ 南海市 | 440683 | ~~Sanshui city~~ 三水市 | 440684 | ~~Gaoming city~~ 高明市 | | |
| 440700 | Jiangmen city 江门市 | | | | | | | | |
| 440701 | District 市辖区 | 440702 | ~~Cheng~~ 城区 | 440703 | Pengjiang 蓬江区 | 440704 | Jianghai 江海区 | 440705 | Xinhui 新会区 |
| 440701 | District 市辖区 | | | 440711 | ~~Jiao~~ 郊区 | | | | |
| 440721 | ~~Xinhui Co.~~ 新会县 | 440722 | ~~Taishan Co.~~ 台山县 | 440723 | ~~Enping Co.~~ 恩平县 | 440724 | ~~Kaiping Co.~~ 开平县 | 440725 | ~~Heshan Co.~~ 鹤山县 |
| 440726 | ~~Yangjiang Co.~~ 阳江县 | 440727 | ~~Yangchun Co.~~ 阳春县 | | | | | | |
| 440781 | Taishan city 台山市 | 440782 | ~~Xinhui city~~ 新会市 | 440783 | Kaiping city 开平市 | 440784 | Heshan city 鹤山市 | 440785 | Enping city 恩平市 |
| 440800 | Zhanjiang city 湛江市 | | | | | | | | |
| 440801 | District 市辖区 | 440802 | Chikan 赤坎区 | 440803 | Xiashan 霞山区 | 440804 | Potou 坡头区 | | |
| 440801 | District 市辖区 | | | 440811 | Mazhang 麻章区 | | | | |
| 440821 | ~~Wuchuan Co.~~ 吴川县 | 440822 | ~~Lianjiang Co.~~ 廉江县 | 440823 | Suixi Co. 遂溪县 | 440824 | ~~Haikang Co.~~ 海康县 | 440825 | Xuwen Co. 徐闻县 |
| 440881 | Lianjiang city 廉江市 | 440882 | Leizhou city 雷州市 | 440883 | Wuchuan city 吴川市 | | | | |
| 440900 | Maoming city 茂名市 | | | | | | | | |
| 440901 | District 市辖区 | 440902 | Maonan 茂南区 | 440903 | ~~Maogang~~ 茂港区 | 440904 | Dianbai 电白区 | | |
| 440921 | ~~Xinyi Co.~~ 信宜县 | 440922 | ~~Gaozhou Co.~~ 高州县 | 440923 | ~~Dianbai Co.~~ 电白县 | 440924 | ~~Huazhou Co.~~ 化州县 | | |
| 440981 | Gaozhou city 高州市 | 440982 | Huazhou city 化州市 | 440983 | Xinyi city 信宜市 | | | | |
| 441000 | ~~Haikou city~~ 海口市 | | | | | | | | |
| 441001 | ~~District~~ 市辖区 | | | | | | | | |
| 441100 | ~~Sanya city~~ 三亚市 | | | | | | | | |
| 441101 | ~~District~~ 市辖区 | | | | | | | | |
| 441200 | Zhaoqing city 肇庆市 | | | | | | | | |
| 441201 | District 市辖区 | 441202 | Duanzhou 端州区 | 441203 | Dinghu 鼎湖区 | 441204 | Gaoyao 高要区 | | |
| 441221 | ~~Gaoyao Co.~~ 高要县 | 441222 | ~~Sihui Co.~~ 四会县 | 441223 | Guangning Co. 广宁县 | 441224 | Huaiji Co. 怀集县 | 441225 | Fengkai Co. 封开县 |
| 441226 | Deqing Co. 德庆县 | 441227 | ~~Yunfu Co.~~ 云浮县 | 441228 | ~~Xinxing Co.~~ 新兴县 | 441229 | ~~Yunan Co.~~ 郁南县 | 441230 | ~~Luoding Co.~~ 罗定县 |
| 441281 | ~~Yunfu city~~ 云浮市 | 441282 | ~~Luoding city~~ 罗定市 | 441283 | ~~Gaoyao city~~ 高要市 | 441284 | Sihui city 四会市 | | |
| 441300 | Huizhou city 惠州市 | | | | | | | | |
| 441301 | District 市辖区 | 441302 | Huicheng 惠城区 | 441303 | Huiyang 惠阳区 | | | | |
| 441321 | ~~Huiyang Co.~~ 惠阳县 | 441322 | Boluo Co. 博罗县 | 441323 | Huidong Co. 惠东县 | 441324 | Longmen Co. 龙门县 | | |
| 441381 | ~~Huiyang city~~ 惠阳市 | | | | | | | | |
| 441400 | Meizhou city 梅州市 | | | | | | | | |
| 441401 | District 市辖区 | 441402 | Meijiang 梅江区 | 441403 | Meixian 梅县区 | | | | |
| 441421 | ~~Mei Co.~~ 梅县 | 441422 | Dabu Co. 大埔县 | 441423 | Fengshun Co. 丰顺县 | 441424 | Wuhua Co. 五华县 | 441425 | ~~Xingning Co.~~ 兴宁县 |
| 441426 | Pingyuan Co. 平远县 | 441427 | Jiaoling Co. 蕉岭县 | | | | | | |
| 441481 | Xingning city 兴宁市 | | | | | | | | |
| 441500 | Shanwei city 汕尾市 | | | | | | | | |
| 441501 | District 市辖区 | 441502 | Cheng 城区 | | | | | | |
| 441521 | Haifeng Co. 海丰县 | 441522 | ~~Lufeng Co.~~ 陆丰县 | 441523 | Luhe Co. 陆河县 | | | | |
| 441581 | Lufeng city 陆丰市 | | | | | | | | |
| 441600 | Heyuan city 河源市 | | | | | | | | |
| 441601 | District 市辖区 | 441602 | Yuancheng 源城区 | | | | | | |
| 441601 | District 市辖区 | | | 441611 | ~~Jiao~~ 郊区 | | | | |
| 441621 | Zijin Co. 紫金县 | 441622 | Longchuan Co. 龙川县 | 441623 | Lianping Co. 连平县 | 441624 | Heping Co. 和平县 | 441625 | Dongyuan Co. 东源县 |
| 441700 | Yangjiang city 阳江市 | | | | | | | | |
| 441701 | District 市辖区 | 441702 | Jiangcheng 江城区 | 441703 | ~~Yangdong~~ 阳东区 | 441704 | Yangdong 阳东区 | | |
| 441721 | Yangxi Co. 阳西县 | 441722 | ~~Yangchun Co.~~ 阳春县 | 441723 | ~~Yangdong Co.~~ 阳东县 | | | | |
| 441781 | Yangchun city 阳春市 | | | | | | | | |
| 441800 | Qingyuan city 清远市 | | | | | | | | |
| 441801 | District 市辖区 | 441802 | Qingcheng 清城区 | 441803 | Qingxin 清新区 | | | | |
| 441801 | District 市辖区 | | | 441811 | ~~Qingjiao~~ 清郊区 | | | | |
| 441821 | Fogang Co. 佛冈县 | 441822 | ~~Yingde Co.~~ 英德县 | 441823 | Yangshan Co. 阳山县 | 441824 | ~~Lian Co.~~ 连县 | 441825 | Lianshan Co. 连山县 |
| 441826 | Liannan Co. 连南县 | 441827 | ~~Qingxin Co.~~ 清新县 | | | | | | |
| 441881 | Yingde city 英德市 | 441882 | Lianzhou city 连州市 | | | | | | |
| 441900 | Dongguan city 东莞市 | | | | | | | | |
| 441901 | District 市辖区 | | | | | | | | |
| 442000 | Zhongshan city 中山市 | | | | | | | | |
| 442001 | District 市辖区 | | | | | | | | |
| 442100 | ~~Hainan AR~~ 海南行政区 | | | | | | | | |
| 442200 | ~~Hainan Prefecture~~ 海南州 | | | | | | | | |
| 442300 | ~~Shantou Prefecture~~ 汕头地区 | | | | | | | | |
| 442400 | ~~Meixian Prefecture~~ 梅县地区 | | | | | | | | |
| 442500 | ~~Huiyang Prefecture~~ 惠阳地区 | | | | | | | | |
| 442600 | ~~Shaoguan Prefecture~~ 韶关地区 | | | | | | | | |
| 442700 | ~~Foshan Prefecture~~ 佛山地区 | | | | | | | | |
| 442701 | ~~Foshan city~~ 佛山市 | 442702 | ~~Jiangmen city~~ 江门市 | 442703 | ~~Shiqi city~~ 石岐市 | | | | |
| 442721 | ~~Sanshui Co.~~ 三水县 | 442722 | ~~Nanhai Co.~~ 南海县 | 442723 | ~~Shunde Co.~~ 顺德县 | 442724 | ~~Zhongshan Co.~~ 中山县 | 442725 | ~~Doumen Co.~~ 斗门县 |
| 442726 | ~~Xinhui Co.~~ 新会县 | 442727 | ~~Taishan Co.~~ 台山县 | 442728 | ~~Enping Co.~~ 恩平县 | 442729 | ~~Kaiping Co.~~ 开平县 | 442730 | ~~Gaohe Co.~~ 高鹤县 |
| 442731 | ~~Heshan Co.~~ 鹤山县 | 442732 | ~~Gaoming Co.~~ 高明县 | | | | | | |
| 442800 | ~~Zhaoqing Prefecture~~ 肇庆地区 | | | | | | | | |
| 442801 | ~~Zhaoqing city~~ 肇庆市 | | | | | | | | |
| 442821 | ~~Gaoyao Co.~~ 高要县 | 442822 | ~~Sihui Co.~~ 四会县 | 442823 | ~~Guangning Co.~~ 广宁县 | 442824 | ~~Huaiji Co.~~ 怀集县 | 442825 | ~~Fengkai Co.~~ 封开县 |
| 442826 | ~~Deqing Co.~~ 德庆县 | 442827 | ~~Yunfu Co.~~ 云浮县 | 442828 | ~~Xinxing Co.~~ 新兴县 | 442829 | ~~Yunan Co.~~ 郁南县 | 442830 | ~~Luoding Co.~~ 罗定县 |
| 442900 | ~~Zhanjiang Prefecture~~ 湛江地区 | | | | | | | | |
| 445100 | Chaozhou city 潮州市 | | | | | | | | |
| 445101 | District 市辖区 | 445102 | Xiangqiao 湘桥区 | 445103 | Chao'an 潮安区 | | | | |
| 445121 | ~~Chao'an Co.~~ 潮安县 | 445122 | Raoping Co. 饶平县 | | | | | | |
| 445200 | Jieyang city 揭阳市 | | | | | | | | |
| 445201 | District 市辖区 | 445202 | Rongcheng 榕城区 | 445203 | Jiedong 揭东区 | | | | |
| 445221 | ~~Jiedong Co.~~ 揭东县 | 445222 | Jiexi Co. 揭西县 | 445223 | ~~Puning Co.~~ 普宁县 | 445224 | Huilai Co. 惠来县 | | |
| 445281 | Puning city 普宁市 | | | | | | | | |
| 445300 | Yunfu city 云浮市 | | | | | | | | |
| 445301 | District 市辖区 | 445302 | Yuncheng 云城区 | 445303 | Yun'an 云安区 | | | | |
| 445321 | Xinxing Co. 新兴县 | 445322 | Yunan Co. 郁南县 | 445323 | ~~Yun'an Co.~~ 云安县 | | | | |
| 445381 | Luoding city 罗定市 | | | | | | | | |
| 449000 | ~~Direct administration~~ 省直辖 | | | | | | | | |
| 449001 | ~~Chaozhou city~~ 潮州市 | | | | | | | | |

== Guangxi (45) ==
| 450000 | Guangxi AR 广西壮族自治区 | | | | | | | | |
| 450100 | Nanning city 南宁市 | | | | | | | | |
| 450101 | District 市辖区 | 450102 | Xingning 兴宁区 | 450103 | Qingxiu 青秀区 | 450104 | ~~Chengbei~~ 城北区 | 450105 | Jiangnan 江南区 |
| 450101 | District 市辖区 | 450106 | ~~Yongxin~~ 永新区 | 450107 | Xixiangtang 西乡塘区 | 450108 | Liangqing 良庆区 | 450109 | Yongning 邕宁区 |
| 450101 | District 市辖区 | 450110 | Wuming 武鸣区 | 450111 | ~~Shijiao~~ 市郊区 | | | | |
| 450121 | ~~Yongning Co.~~ 邕宁县 | 450122 | ~~Wuming Co.~~ 武鸣县 | 450123 | Long'an Co. 隆安县 | 450124 | Mashan Co. 马山县 | 450125 | Shanglin Co. 上林县 |
| 450126 | Binyang Co. 宾阳县 | 450127 | Heng Co. 横县 | | | | | | |
| 450200 | Liuzhou city 柳州市 | | | | | | | | |
| 450201 | District 市辖区 | 450202 | Chengzhong 城中区 | 450203 | Yufeng 鱼峰区 | 450204 | Liunan 柳南区 | 450205 | Liubei 柳北区 |
| 450201 | District 市辖区 | 450206 | Liujiang 柳江区 | | | | | | |
| 450201 | District 市辖区 | | | 450211 | ~~Shijiao~~ 市郊区 | | | | |
| 450221 | ~~Liujiang Co.~~ 柳江县 | 450222 | Liucheng Co. 柳城县 | 450223 | Luzhai Co. 鹿寨县 | 450224 | Rong'an Co. 融安县 | 450225 | Rongshui Co. 融水县 |
| 450226 | Sanjiang Co. 三江县 | | | | | | | | |
| 450300 | Guilin city 桂林市 | | | | | | | | |
| 450301 | District 市辖区 | 450302 | Xiufeng 秀峰区 | 450303 | Diecai 叠彩区 | 450304 | Xiangshan 象山区 | 450305 | Qixing 七星区 |
| 450301 | District 市辖区 | | | 450311 | Yanshan 雁山区 | 450312 | Lingui 临桂区 | | |
| 450301 | District 市辖区 | | | | | 450320 | ~~Shi~~ 市区 | | |
| 450321 | Yangshuo Co. 阳朔县 | 450322 | ~~Lingui Co.~~ 临桂县 | 450323 | Lingchuan Co. 灵川县 | 450324 | Quanzhou Co. 全州县 | 450325 | Xing'an Co. 兴安县 |
| 450326 | Yongfu Co. 永福县 | 450327 | Guanyang Co. 灌阳县 | 450328 | Longsheng Co. 龙胜县 | 450329 | Ziyuan Co. 资源县 | 450330 | Pingle Co. 平乐县 |
| 450331 | Lipu Co. 荔浦县 | 450332 | Gongcheng Co. 恭城县 | | | | | | |
| 450400 | Wuzhou city 梧州市 | | | | | | | | |
| 450401 | District 市辖区 | 450402 | ~~Baiyun~~ 白云区 | 450403 | Wanxiu 万秀区 | 450404 | ~~Dieshan~~ 蝶山区 | 450405 | Changzhou 长洲区 |
| 450401 | District 市辖区 | 450406 | Longxu 龙圩区 | | | | | | |
| 450401 | District 市辖区 | | | 450411 | ~~Shijiao~~ 市郊区 | | | | |
| 450421 | Cangwu Co. 苍梧县 | 450422 | Teng Co. 藤县 | 450423 | Mengshan Co. 蒙山县 | | | | |
| 450481 | Cenxi city 岑溪市 | | | | | | | | |
| 450500 | Beihai city 北海市 | | | | | | | | |
| 450501 | District 市辖区 | 450502 | Haicheng 海城区 | 450503 | Yinhai 银海区 | 450504 | ~~Tieshangang~~ 铁山港区 | | |
| 450501 | District 市辖区 | | | 450511 | ~~Shijiao~~ 市郊区 | 450512 | Tieshangang 铁山港区 | | |
| 450521 | Hepu Co. 合浦县 | | | | | | | | |
| 450600 | Fangchenggang city 防城港市 | | | | | | | | |
| 450601 | District 市辖区 | 450602 | Gangkou 港口区 | 450603 | Fangcheng 防城区 | | | | |
| 450631 | Shangsi Co. 上思县 | 450632 | ~~Pubei Co.~~ 浦北县 | | | | | | |
| 450681 | Dongxing city 东兴市 | | | | | | | | |
| 450700 | Qinzhou city 钦州市 | | | | | | | | |
| 450701 | District 市辖区 | 450702 | Qinnan 钦南区 | 450703 | Qinbei 钦北区 | | | | |
| 450721 | Lingshan Co. 灵山县 | 450722 | Pubei Co. 浦北县 | | | | | | |
| 450800 | Guigang city 贵港市 | | | | | | | | |
| 450801 | District 市辖区 | 450802 | Gangbei 港北区 | 450803 | Gangnan 港南区 | 450804 | Qintang 覃塘区 | | |
| 450821 | Pingnan Co. 平南县 | | | | | | | | |
| 450881 | Guiping city 桂平市 | | | | | | | | |
| 450900 | Yulin city 玉林市 | | | | | | | | |
| 450901 | District 市辖区 | 450902 | Yuzhou 玉州区 | 450903 | Fumian 福绵区 | | | | |
| 450921 | Rong Co. 容县 | 450922 | Luchuan Co. 陆川县 | 450923 | Bobai Co. 博白县 | 450924 | Xingye Co. 兴业县 | | |
| 450981 | Beiliu city 北流市 | | | | | | | | |
| 451000 | Baise city 百色市 | | | | | | | | |
| 451001 | District 市辖区 | 451002 | Youjiang 右江区 | | | | | | |
| 451021 | Tianyang Co. 田阳县 | 451022 | Tiandong Co. 田东县 | 451023 | Pingguo Co. 平果县 | 451024 | Debao Co. 德保县 | 451025 | ~~Jingxi Co.~~ 靖西县 |
| 451026 | Napo Co. 那坡县 | 451027 | Lingyun Co. 凌云县 | 451028 | Leye Co. 乐业县 | 451029 | Tianlin Co. 田林县 | 451030 | Xilin Co. 西林县 |
| 451031 | Longlin Co. 隆林县 | | | | | | | | |
| 451081 | Jingxi city 靖西市 | | | | | | | | |
| 451100 | Hezhou city 贺州市 | | | | | | | | |
| 451101 | District 市辖区 | 451102 | Babu 八步区 | 451103 | Pinggui 平桂区 | | | | |
| 451101 | District 市辖区 | | | 451119 | ~~Pinggui~~ 平桂区 | | | | |
| 451121 | Zhaoping Co. 昭平县 | 451122 | Zhongshan Co. 钟山县 | 451123 | Fuchuan Co. 富川县 | | | | |
| 451200 | Hechi city 河池市 | | | | | | | | |
| 451201 | District 市辖区 | 451202 | Jinchengjiang 金城江区 | 451203 | Yizhou 宜州区 | | | | |
| 451221 | Nandan Co. 南丹县 | 451222 | Tian'e Co. 天峨县 | 451223 | Fengshan Co. 凤山县 | 451224 | Donglan Co. 东兰县 | 451225 | Luocheng Co. 罗城县 |
| 451226 | Huanjiang Co. 环江县 | 451227 | Bama Co. 巴马县 | 451228 | Du'an Co. 都安县 | 451229 | Dahua 大化县 | | |
| 451281 | ~~Yizhou city~~ 宜州市 | | | | | | | | |
| 451300 | Laibin city 来宾市 | | | | | | | | |
| 451301 | District 市辖区 | 451302 | Xingbin 兴宾区 | | | | | | |
| 451321 | Xincheng Co. 忻城县 | 451322 | Xiangzhou Co. 象州县 | 451323 | Wuxuan Co. 武宣县 | 451324 | Jinxiu Co. 金秀县 | | |
| 451381 | Heshan city 合山市 | | | | | | | | |
| 451400 | Chongzuo city 崇左市 | | | | | | | | |
| 451401 | District 市辖区 | 451402 | Jiangzhou 江州区 | | | | | | |
| 451421 | Fusui Co. 扶绥县 | 451422 | Ningming Co. 宁明县 | 451423 | Longzhou Co. 龙州县 | 451424 | Daxin Co. 大新县 | 451425 | Tiandeng Co. 天等县 |
| 451481 | Pingxiang city 凭祥市 | | | | | | | | |
| 452100 | ~~Nanning Prefecture~~ 南宁地区 | | | | | | | | |
| 452200 | ~~Liuzhou Prefecture~~ 柳州地区 | | | | | | | | |
| 452300 | ~~Guilin Prefecture~~ 桂林地区 | | | | | | | | |
| 452400 | ~~Hezhou Prefecture~~ 贺州地区 | | | | | | | | |
| 452500 | ~~Yulin Prefecture~~ 玉林地区 | | | | | | | | |
| 452600 | ~~Bose Prefecture~~ 百色地区 | | | | | | | | |
| 452700 | ~~Hechi Prefecture~~ 河池地区 | | | | | | | | |
| 452800 | ~~Qinzhou Prefecture~~ 钦州地区 | | | | | | | | |

== Hainan (46) ==
| 460000 | Hainan Province 海南省 | | | | | | | | |
| 460100 | Haikou city 海口市 | | | | | | | | |
| 460101 | District 市辖区 | 460102 | ~~Zhendong~~ 振东区 | 460103 | ~~Xinhua~~ 新华区 | 460104 | ~~Xiuying~~ 秀英区 | 460105 | Xiuying 秀英区 |
| 460101 | District 市辖区 | 460106 | Longhua 龙华区 | 460107 | Qiongshan 琼山区 | 460108 | Meilan 美兰区 | | |
| 460200 | Sanya city 三亚市 | | | | | | | | |
| 460201 | District 市辖区 | 460202 | Haitang 海棠区 | 460203 | Jiyang 吉阳区 | 460204 | Tianya 天涯区 | 460205 | Yazhou 崖州区 |
| 460300 | Sansha city 三沙市 | | | | | | | | |
| 460301 | District 市辖区 | | Xisha 西沙区 | | Nansha 南沙区 | | Zhongsha 中沙区 | | |
| 460321 | ~~Xisha~~ 西沙群岛 | 460322 | ~~Nansha~~ 南沙群岛 | 460323 | ~~Zhongsha~~ 中沙群岛 | | | | |
| 460400 | Danzhou city 儋州市 | | | | | | | | |
| 460401 | District 市辖区 | | | | | | | | |
| 469000 | Direct administration 省直辖 | | | | | | | | |
| 469001 | Wuzhishan city 五指山市 | 469002 | Qionghai city 琼海市 | 469003 | ~~Danzhou city~~ 儋州市 | 469004 | ~~Qiongshan city~~ 琼山市 | 469005 | Wenchang city 文昌市 |
| 469006 | Wanning city 万宁市 | 469007 | Dongfang city 东方市 | | | | | | |
| 469021 | Ding'an Co. 定安县 | 469022 | Tunchang Co. 屯昌县 | 469023 | Chengmai Co. 澄迈县 | 469024 | Lingao Co. 临高县 | 469025 | Baisha Co. 白沙县 |
| 469026 | Changjiang Co. 昌江县 | 469027 | Ledong Co. 乐东县 | 469028 | Lingshui Co. 陵水县 | 469029 | Baoting Co. 保亭县 | 469030 | Qiongzhong Co. 琼中县 |
| 469031 | ~~Xisha~~ 西沙群岛 | 469032 | ~~Nansha~~ 南沙群岛 | 469033 | ~~Zhongsha~~ 中沙群岛 | | | | |
| 460000 | ~~Direct administration~~ 省直辖 | | | | | | | | |
| 460001 | ~~Tongshi city~~ 通什市 | 460002 | ~~Qionghai city~~ 琼海市 | 460003 | ~~Danzhou city~~ 儋州市 | 460004 | ~~Qiongshan city~~ 琼山市 | 460005 | ~~Wenchang city~~ 文昌市 |
| 460006 | ~~Wanning city~~ 万宁市 | 460007 | ~~Dongfang city~~ 东方市 | | | | | | |
| 460021 | ~~Qiongshan Co.~~ 琼山县 | 460022 | ~~Wenchang Co.~~ 文昌县 | 460023 | ~~Qionghai Co.~~ 琼海县 | 460024 | ~~Wanning Co.~~ 万宁县 | 460025 | ~~Ding'an Co.~~ 定安县 |
| 460026 | ~~Tunchang Co.~~ 屯昌县 | 460027 | ~~Chengmai Co.~~ 澄迈县 | 460028 | ~~Lingao Co.~~ 临高县 | 460029 | ~~Dan Co.~~ 儋县 | 460030 | ~~Baisha Co.~~ 白沙县 |
| 460031 | ~~Changjiang Co.~~ 昌江县 | 460032 | ~~Dongfang Co.~~ 东方县 | 460033 | ~~Ledong Co.~~ 乐东县 | 460034 | ~~Lingshui Co.~~ 陵水县 | 460035 | ~~Baoting Co.~~ 保亭县 |
| 460036 | ~~Qiongzhong Co.~~ 琼中县 | 460037 | ~~Xisha~~ 西沙群岛 | 460038 | ~~Nansha~~ 南沙群岛 | 460039 | ~~Zhongsha~~ 中沙群岛 | | |
