= Yunan =

Yunan may refer to:

== China ==
- Either of two distinct county-level divisions in Yunfu, Guangdong, China:
  - Yunan County (郁南县)
  - Yun'an District (云安区)
- Yu Nan (Chinese: 余男; born 1978), Chinese actress

== Greece ==
- Yunan, oriental name for:
  - the ancient Ionia region in Anatolia
  - Greece, the Greeks or something of Greek origin

== Other uses ==
- Yunan (film)
- King Yunan, a character in One Thousand and One Nights
- General Yunan, a character in Amphibia

== See also ==
- Unani or Yunani, traditional system of Islamic medicine from India
- Yunnan, a province of China
- Nanyu (disambiguation)
- 雲南 (disambiguation)
- Yun (disambiguation)
- Yu (disambiguation)
- Nan (disambiguation)
- An (disambiguation)
