= Yun'an, Yunfu =

Yun'an 云安区
- District
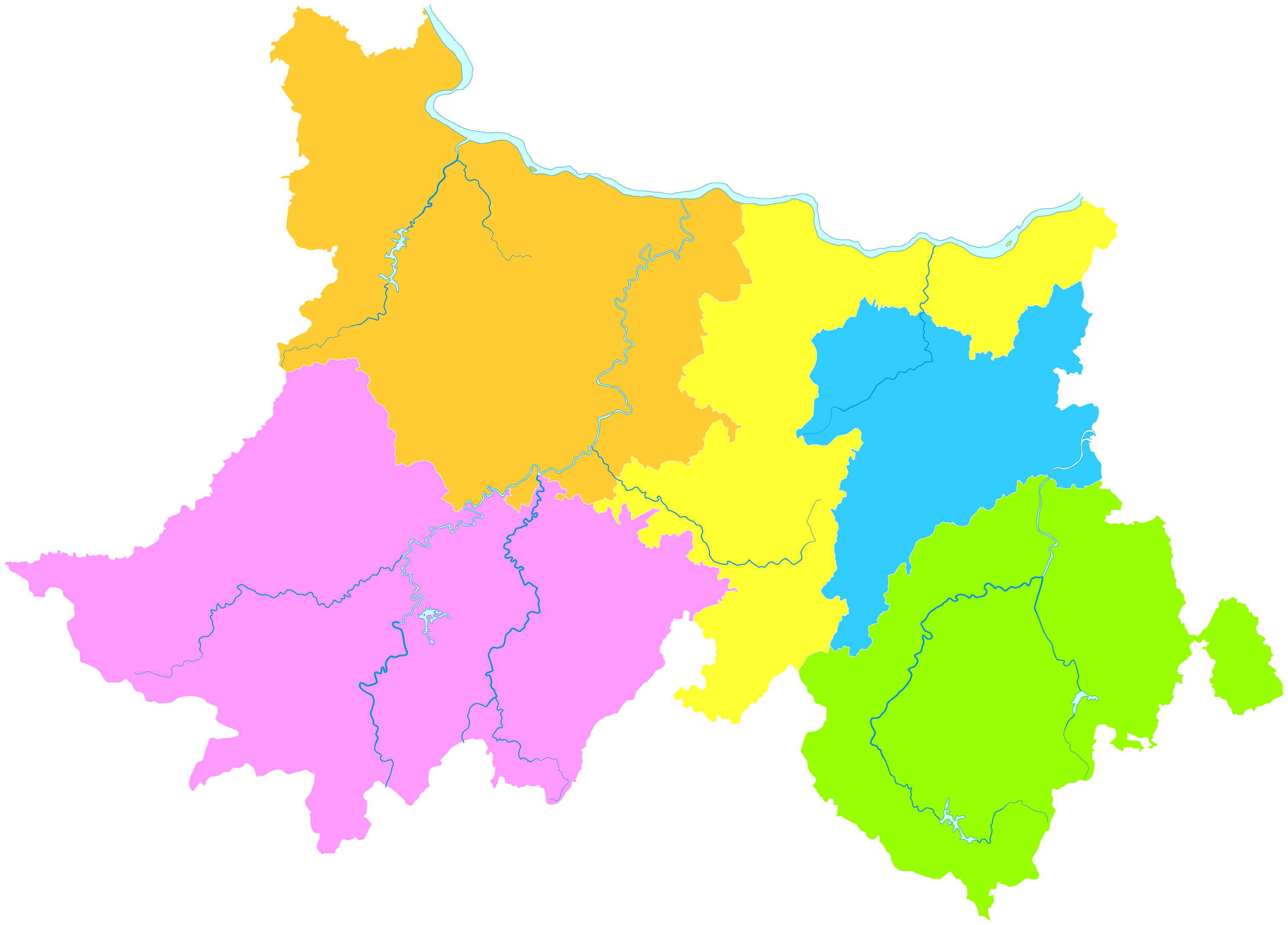
- Yun'an (yellow) in Yunfu

- Yunfu in Guangdong
- Coordinates: 23°04′16″N 112°00′11″E
- Country: People's Republic of China
- Province: Guangdong
- Prefecture-level city: Yunfu
- County seat: Liudu (六都镇)

Area
  - Total: 1,231 km^{2} (475 sq mi)

Population (2020)
  - Total: 235,390
  - Density: 191.2/km^{2} (495.3/sq mi)
- Time zone: UTC+8 (China Standard)
- Postal code: 527500
- Area code: 0766
- Website: www.yunan.gov.cn

Yun'an District (simplified Chinese: 云安区; traditional Chinese: 雲安區; pinyin: Yún'ān Qū) is a district of Yunfu, Guangdong province, China. It used to be a county of Yunfu, called Yun'an County, but it has been changed as Yun'an District in 2014. It is located in the western part of Guangdong province, the central area of Yunfu, and the southern side runs the Xi River. It is between 111°43′26″E-112°10′17″E, and 22°34′26″N-23°08′01″N. It borders the seat of Yunfu, called Yuncheng District to the east, Xinxing County and Yangchun to the south, Luoding city and Yunan County to the west, and Xi River and Deqing county to the north.

== Administration ==
Subdivisions of Yun'an District
#	Name	Hanzi
1	Liudu town	六都镇
2	Gaocun town	高村镇
3	Baishi town	白石镇
4	Zhen'an town	镇安镇
5	Fulin town	富林镇
6	Shicheng town	石城镇
7	Duyang town	都杨镇

Yun'an District has seven township-level divisions, and each part manages its things separately. Its administrative areas includes Liudu town, Gaocun town, Baishi town, Zhen'an town, Fulin town, Shicheng town and Duyang town.

== History ==
In the Zhou dynasty, Yun'an was charged by Yue (粤) which has become the short name of Guangdong province now. From the Qin dynasty to the Qing dynasty, it was fragmentally divided and managed by several different regions. In 1914, it was managed by Yunfu county. In 1994, it was managed by the Yuncheng District, the capital of Yunfu. In 1996, it was separated from the Yuncheng District as Yun'an County. In 2014, it has become Yun'an district.

== Population and People ==
=== Population ===
In 1992, its population has been 263,717. At the end of 2008, the population has been 278,200. The birth rate was 10.69%, and mortality rate was 5.66%, and natural growth rate was 5.03%. In September 2014, the population of the newly established district has been 330,000.

=== People ===
Before the Ming dynasty, Yao and Zhuang people were the main residents. However, after the political suppression of the government, most migrated to other places. Later, the Han Chinese gradually migrated here, and the remaining Yao people lived fragmentally. To the Qing dynasty, the Yao people had been conformed by the Han Chinese. After the foundation of the People's Republic of China, the ethnic groups still have lived partly. On November 1, 2000, Han Chinese constitutes 99.73% of the total population in the county, while the population of the ethnic minority accounts for 0.27%.

== Climate ==
Its main climate is subtropics which is mild all the year with plentiful rainfall. Its average annual rainfall is 1610 mm, but the time-space distribution of rainfall is uneven in a year. It is overcast and dry in spring, hot and rainy in the summer, cool in autumn, and dry and sunny in winter. The average annual temperature is 21.5 °C, and the highest one is 36 °C, and the lowest one is 6 °C.

== Language ==
The languages most commonly spoken are Yunfu variant of Cantonese, Min and the Hakka dialect.

== Custom and festivals ==
=== Minnows Section ===
The Minnows Section (鱼花节), also called the Festival of Minnows or the Birthday of the Pond Fairy by the locals, is celebrated by the fishermen along the Xi River, within Yun'an District. "鱼花" (pinyin: yúhuā), whose original name is "Yuwa" (鱼娃), because in old Cantonese, they sounded the same, so people mixed them up and the pronunciation of "Hua" is a symbol of civilization, and "Hua" in Chinese means flower which stands for goodness. Thus, it gradually develops to "Yuhua", which means the little fishes not long after a hatch.

Every year, the lunar day of 20, April, is the Minnows Section of the Liudu town (六都镇). At this day, the locals will make a grand ritual and celebration, whose ritual activities mainly includes the lion dance and the worship in the pond fairy temple with a traditional band (performing with traditional Chinese instrument like Erhu, drum, suona horn and so on). People pray for good weather, and good business and invite relatives and friends, the most of whom are businessmen of fish. It has been listed as intangible cultural heritage at the county level of China.

=== Temple Fairs ===
Some places of the district keep the custom of Temple Fairs, "庙会“ (Miaohui) in Chinese. It is celebrated in the same day (lunar calendar) each year in some villages, while some villages celebrates it every few years. When the Temple Fair comes, the locals will make Mici (米糍 in Chinese, a kind of Dim sum made by rice) and Zongzi to serve the guests in the banquets, and go to the temple to worship the gods of China. Some places keep the custom of carrying the sculpture of Chinese gods that have been worshiped in the temple from village to village, called "The travel of bodhisattva (a female god of fertility, good luck etc. worshiped by Chinese)", so as to pray for a good weather.

=== Shaopao ===
In Yun'an District, most rural areas keep this folk custom, also called "firing cannons" or "the ceremony of cannons", "烧炮” in Chinese. It is one of the traditional folk activities that the locals celebrate the good harvest of the last year, and pray for a good weather and a good harvest this year. The custom enjoys a long history, dated back to the late Ming dynasty, and has been followed for more than four hundred years. The ceremony includes music, ancestor worship, lion dance, firing the cannon ("燃炮" in Chinese), "sending up the cannon" ("放炮" in Chinese), "pursuit the cannon" ("抢彩头" in Chinese) etc. The most popular is to chase the "cannon": after the launch of the cannon, the villagers rush to pick it up, to win a reward. Locals prepare feasts on the day.

== Food ==
=== Liantan Stuffed Bean Curd ===
"连滩酿豆腐” in Chinese, it is a dish made with fish meat, salt, fermented blank bean, leeks, flour, and pepper.

In Yun'an, the ordinary family get used to entertain their relatives or friends with it in festivals, especially the area of Liantan near the Xi River. The dish is well regarded in Guangdong province, even in Hong Kong and Macau. It is believed that the flavour of the "overnight tofu", tastes more creamy and sweeter, and therefore the locals tend to make much more for the next day to eat again.

=== Chadong Tofu ===
"茶洞豆腐“ in Chinese. Chadong town is located in the middle of Yun'an district, and its tofu is one of the local specialties. It is because Yunfu city lies in limestone area, so the water is rich in calcium, which lends flavour to tofu made from it

=== Specialties of Xi River ===
"西江河鲜” in Chinese. The Xi River is known for its specialties as fresh water fish, shrimps, crabs, etc. The meat tastes like chicken, and is sweet.

=== Xi River Cured Meat ===
"西江腊味“ in Chinese, the cured meat is made after cleaning the gut, and adds salt and spices, and mixes them together, curing for about a days, and then hangs them up outside the door to dry it naturally or dries them artificially with machine. The practice originated when fishermen could not eat or sell all the fish after a large harvest.

=== Baishi Watermelon ===
"白石西瓜" in Chinese. It origins in a village of Baishi town. It has a sweet taste and begins harvest in late May. The feature of the watermelons is that they grow in yellow land which is thought to be suitable for the growth of watermelons by the locals, and the size of them are usually even, weighted about 6 to 12 kg each one.

== Tourist attractions ==
"Chief Karst Cave" (魁岩; Kuiyan), "The Cloud and Mist Mountains" (云雾山; Yunwu Shan), "Chen Taibao shrine and Barracks Wall" (龙崖陈太保祠; Longya Chentaibao ci, 和兵营城墙; Binying Chengqiang) contribute to the major attractions of Yun'an District.

=== Chief Karst Cave ===
"魁岩" in Chinese, Chief Karst Cave, is located in Daqing Fonglou village (大庆凤楼村), Liudu town (六都镇), Yun'an district, Yunfu city. It lies in the Chief Mountain (魁岩山), which is in the south of the capital town, Liudu, about 5000 meters away and about 500 meters from its west part. The Chief Karst Cave is located in the north of the mountain, and it's the top of the five karst caves of the town, Liudu, and the most valuable cultural relic. According to the "Dong'an county annals" (《东安县志》),“在县东北廉冯执中读书于此，石刻冯诗及都督陈璘诗犹存。” The name of the cave is from a scholar of the Ming dynasty, who taught himself here and later became an official of the nation after successfully passing the national exam.

=== Cloud and Mist Mountains ===
The Cloud and Mist Mountains (云雾山) shares the nature of block mountain, and it is the whole name of a series of mountains in sequence of northeast to the southwest. Columns mountain has formed many river ravines and multi-level waterfalls, so here is rich in hydropower resources. The height of the mountain, generally is between 300 and 800 m (980 and 2,620 ft). The highest peak is located in the south of Xinyi county, 1,704 m (5,591 ft) above mean sea level. There are many long and narrow valleys and limestone karst basins. Valleys also stretch along the tectonic line from the northeast to the southwest, about 10 kilometers long, whose width is about 0.5 to 1 km (0.31 to 0.62 mi). A series of karst hills are in the basin. The annual rainfall of The Cloud and Mist Mountains is about 1500 mm with a high humidity, plenty of river water, deep canyons, and the right-angle bend. There are pine, Chinese fir, bamboo forest etc., and also tea.

=== Chen Taibao shrine and Barracks Wall ===
"龙崖陈太保祠和兵营城墙" in Chinese, it lies in Da'ying village (大营村), Liudu, Yun'an district. The Shrine by Chen Taibao (Taibao is an official rank in ancient China) and the Barracks Wall have been built in Ming dynasty in 1576. The building is large with carefully planned layout, whose structural design is unique, completely keeping the architectural style of the Ming dynasty, with strong local characteristic and folk-custom of the west of Guangdong province. It has scientific value to the research of the history of ancient architecture.

== Transportation ==
Yun'an borders Xi River along which can go to Wuzhou, Guigang, Guangxi province, and enables direct cargo freight to Guangzhou, Hong Kong, and Macau. Yunfu New Port is the largest river port in Guangdong province, and is the second class national port. The port has seven 2000 - ton berths, berthing capacity of 5000 tons, and the largest annual transportation amount is 10 million tons. Besides, there are National highway 324, Guangwu Expressway, Nanning–Guangzhou High-Speed Railway and Yunfudong Railway Station.

== Industry ==
=== Primary industry ===
In 2008, the annual crop planting area of Yun'an was 27806.6667 hectares, the output of grain in the whole year was 92900 tons, and the total output of meat was 15105 tons. Moreover, the orange of Nansheng town, the watermelon of Baishi town, the dried beancurd sticks of Tuodong town, the silkworm of Zhen'an town have been the "characteristic agriculture" of Yun'an District with a steady development. Nansheng town is abundant in oranges as a professional region in Guangdong province. The silkworm production of Zhen'an town both has a reputation in Yunfu and Guangdong province.

=== Secondary industry ===
Yun'an plays an important role in the development of stone building materials industry of Yunfu, and its stone material production enterprises mainly stand along the national highway 324 that run through the Shicheng town, Zhen'an town and Baishi town. There are more than 850 enterprises. It has established "a street of white stone (marble) ", "a street of stone furniture " in Shicheng town and "an industrial region of furniture (mainly made by granite)" in Baishi town, Jinrui stone trading market, and other professional stone producing factories and sales market. By the end of 2007, the production of the natural stone plates and artificial marble plates has been more than 800 square meters. Yun'an accelerates the development of cement industry, and encourages and helps enterprises to achieve an innovation-oriented and sustainable development with a scientific outlook. The seat of Yun'an District, Liudu, is a professional town of cement production in Guangdong province.

=== Tertiary industry ===
In 2008, the total retail sales of social consumer goods totaled 590.5 million yuan. And the holesale and retail sale was 652.87 million yuan. And the money of import and export totaled $8.0118 million. It has earned more than $33.2038 million via the cooperation with foreign companies, and the actual use of foreign capital was $11.923 million. Its transportation, warehousing and postal service added value of 59.81 million yuan. The total number of the tour group was 758 people, of which within the Guangdong province were 372, while outside the Guangdong province were 386.
