= Pingtai, Guangdong =

Pingtai 平台镇
- Town
- Location in Guangdong
- Coordinates: 23°15′09″N 111°24′43″E
- Country: People's Republic of China
- Province: Guangdong
- Prefecture-level city: Yunfu
- County: Yunan
- Elevation: 50 m (160 ft)
- Time zone: UTC+8 (China Standard)
- Area code: 0766

Pingtai (simplified Chinese: 平台; traditional Chinese: 平台 or 平臺; pinyin: Píngtái; Jyutping: ping^{4}toi^{4*2}; lit. 'platform or terrace') is a town of Yunan County in western Guangdong province, China, just 4 kilometres (2.5 mi) southeast of the border with Guangxi and south of G80 Guangzhou–Kunming Expressway. As of 2011, it has one residential community (社区) and 13 villages under its administration.

== See also ==
- List of township-level divisions of Guangdong
