= Yunfu Cantonese =

Dialect of Yue Chinese

- 云浮白话 / 雲浮白話
- Native to: China
- Region: Yunfu, Guangdong
- Native speakers: (400,000 cited 1995)
- Language family: Sino-Tibetan: Sinitic; Yue; Yuehai; Yunfu Cantonese
- Writing system: Han characters

Language codes
- ISO 639-3: –
- Glottolog: None

Yunfu Cantonese or Yunfu vernacular (simplified Chinese: 云浮白话; traditional Chinese: 雲浮白話) is a dialect of Yue Chinese spoken in Yunfu, Guangdong, China. It is classified as a variety of Yuehai Yue, or in more recent classification, Guangfu Yue.

== Phonology ==
This section is mostly based on the variety spoken in Yuncheng.

=== Initials ===
The inventory of initials consists of 20 consonants (including the null initial):

		Labial	Alveolar	Palatal	Velar		Glottal
		Labial	Alveolar	Palatal	plain	labialized	Glottal
Stop	plain	p 爸	t 打		k 家	kʷ (Note: Zhan & Cheung (1998:16) analyze /j/, /w/ and the lip rounding in /kʷ/ and /kʷʰ/ as part of finals.) 怪	(ʔ) (Note: This is the null initial. Syllables beginning with the null initial have some glottal constriction at the onset.) 矮
Stop	aspirated	pʰ 怕	tʰ 他		kʰ 茄	kʷʰ 葵	
Affricate	plain		t͡s 坐				
Affricate	aspirated		t͡sʰ 初				
Fricative		f 花	s 社				h 下
Nasal		m 妈 / 媽	n (Note: Song, Yu & Zhuang (1995:16) report that speakers clearly distinguish /l/ and /n/, but Zhan & Cheung (1998:28) describe /n/ as having weak nasality and may sometimes sound similar to /l/.) 拿		ŋ 我		
Approximant			l 罗 / 羅	j 野		w 蛙	

=== Tones ===
Traditional accounts consider there to be eight tone categories:

Syllable type	Open syllables					Checked syllables		
Traditional tone name	dark flat 阴平 / 陰平	light flat 阳平 / 陽平	dark rising 阴上 / 陰上	light rising 阳上 / 陽上	departing 去声 / 去聲	dark entering 阴入 / 陰入 (Note: Also known as the upper dark entering (上阴入 / 上陰入) tone.)	mid entering 中入 (Note: Also known as the lower dark entering (下阴入 / 下陰入) tone.)	light entering 陽入 / 陽入
Description	high level	low falling	mid rising	low rising	mid level	high level	mid level	low level
Example	诗 / 詩	时 / 時	史	市	试 / 試	识 / 識	泄	食
Tone letter (Chao tone numerals)	˥ (55), ˥˧ (53) (Note: ˥˧ (53) is more common when read monosyllabically.)	˨˩ (21)	˧˥ (35)	˨˧ (23) (Note: Also recorded as ˩˧ (13).)	˧ (33)	˥ (55)	˧ (33)	˨ (22)
