= Wang Henei =

Chinese sculptor

- 王合内
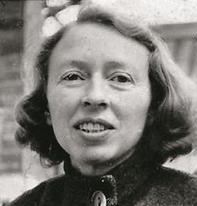
- Born: Renée June-Nikel; 1912; Paris, France
- Died: January 24, 2000 (aged 87–88); Beijing, China
- Resting place: Babaoshan Revolutionary Cemetery, Beijing, China
- Education: Beaux-Arts de Paris
- Known for: Sculptures of animals
- Spouse: Wang Linyi

Wang Henei (Chinese: 王合内; pinyin: Wáng Hénèi, née Renée June-Nikel, 1912–2000), was a Chinese sculptor and professor.

== Biography ==
=== France ===
Wang was born Renée June-Nikel in Paris, France, in 1912. She was of Jewish descent. She studied sculpture at the l'Ecole des Beaux-arts in Nice beginning in 1929, and continued at the Beaux-Arts de Paris in 1934.

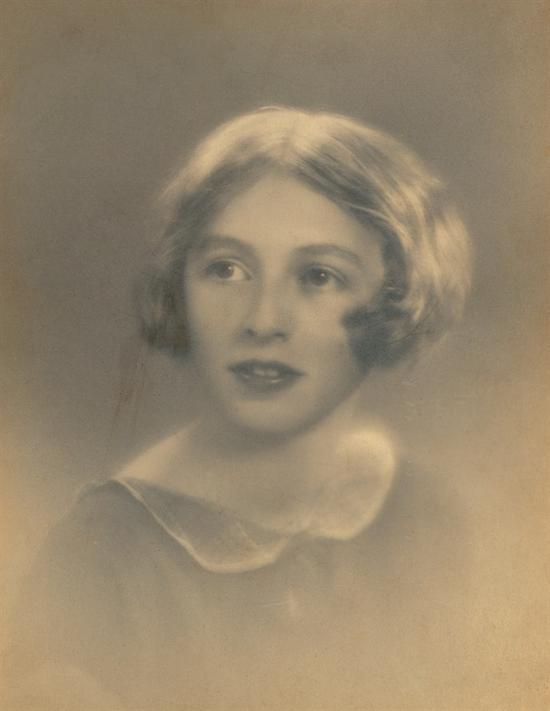
Renée June-Nikel, 1929

She was introduced to Wang Linyi (Chinese: 王临乙; pinyin: Wáng Línyǐ) in 1933 by their mutual friend, Chen Zhixiu (Chinese: 陈芝秀; pinyin: Chén Zhīxiù). The two quickly fell in love. Linyi, a Chinese national born in 1908, had begun studying sculpture in Lyon in 1927 by the arrangement of renowned Chinese painter Xu Beihong before being admitted to the Beaux-Arts de Paris in 1932. June-Nikel's parents objected to their daughter marrying a poor Chinese man, but relented after Linyi graduated with top marks, returned to China, and secured a professorship at the National Peiping Art Academy. They married in France in 1937, with June-Nikel taking Wang Henei as her married name.

=== Second Sino-Japanese War ===
Wang and her husband moved to China a month and a half after the wedding. In July, the Second Sino-Japanese War started with the Marco Polo Bridge Incident, forcing the couple to flee to Shanghai along with the Art Academy. A month later, the Battle of Shanghai forced them to flee to Lushan in Jianxi Provence. The Wangs and the Art Academy were forced to move throughout Southern China during 1938–1940, first to Yuanling, then Guiyang, where Wang was nearly killed when Japanese bombs destroyed the makeshift camp they were staying in. They moved on to Kunming, then Jinming, and arrived in Bishan at the end of 1940.

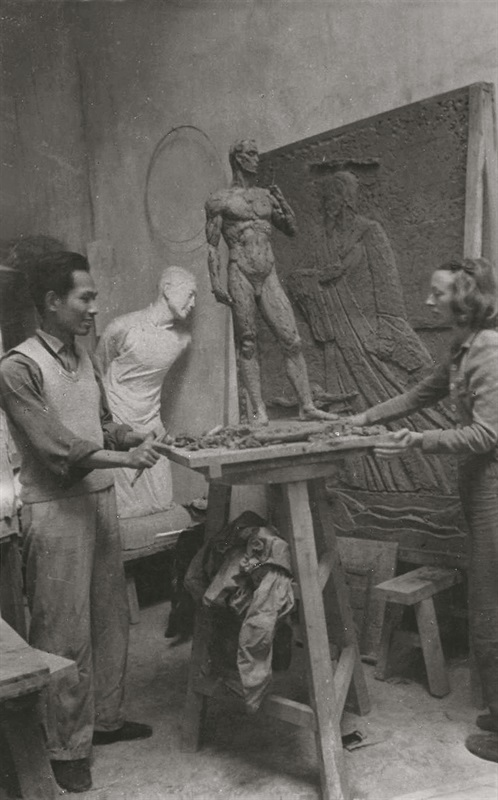
Wang Linyi and Wang Henei in their home studio, 1943

The couple spent the remainder of the war in a home that doubled as their studio in Phoenix Mountain (Chinese: 凤凰山; pinyin: Fènghuángshān), Ciqikou, Chongqing. During this time, Phoenix Mountain was an artist's village with painters and sculptors gathering together to work on their projects, but little of the art they created at the time has survived.

=== Post-war and the People's Republic of China ===
In 1947, the couple moved to Yiyi Hutong in Beijing, where they had a small studio in their home. Wang taught sketching and sculpture in the Arts and Crafts department of Beijing Normal University. In 1951, she was appointed professor-sculptor at the Central Academy of Fine Arts (CAFA), where she taught sculpture, sketching, and French.

Linyi, also a professor at CAFA, was framed for corruption during the Three-anti Campaign in 1952. He was tortured to give forced confessions, and tried to kill himself twice to prove his innocence. Wang was able to secure his release by convincing the seriously ill Xu Beihong, now the head of CAFA, to send a letter to the Ministry of Culture demanding the matter be investigated.

Wang became the first naturalized citizen of the People's Republic of China in 1955.

Wang returned to France for the first time in 1976 to visit family. Her brother beseeched her to stay, but she decided to return without saying anything about her life in China.

Linyi died on July 16, 1997, at the age of 89. Wang died on January 24, 2000. They did not have any children.

== Art ==
Wang Henei was primarily known for her sculptures of animals, such as Mother and Child, Nursing Deer, and Kitten Washing Face. Her lively figures combined the elegance of French sculptures with feminine feelings. She preferred to work in clay, mainly producing small figures.

You must love animals and have feelings for animals; without feelings, you cannot create animal sculptures.

— Wang Henei

In 2015, the National Art Museum of China (NAMOC) presented an exhibition of the works of Wang Henei and Wang Linyi.
