= Nanyu =

Nanyu may refer to:

- Nanyu, Minhou County (南屿镇), a town in Minhou County, Fujian, China
- Nanyu, Jingxing County (南峪镇), a town in Hebei, China
