= 雲南 (disambiguation) =

Chinese name
- Traditional Chinese: 雲南
- Simplified Chinese: 云南
Transcriptions
Standard Mandarin
- Hanyu Pinyin: Yúnnán
- Bopomofo: ㄩㄣˊ ㄋㄢˊ
- Wade–Giles: Yün^{2}-nan^{2}
Hakka
- Romanization: Yùn-nàm
Yue: Cantonese
- Yale Romanization: Wàhn-nàahm
- Jyutping: Wan^{4}-naam^{4}
Southern Min
- Hokkien POJ: Hûn-lâm

Japanese name
- Kanji: 雲南
Transcriptions
- Romanization: Unnan

雲南 may refer to:

- Yunnan, a province of China
  - Yunnan Airlines, a former airline that merged into China Eastern Airlines
  - Li Yunnan, a Chinese weightlifter
- Unnam-myeon (운남면), a myeon, the southern part of Muan County, South Jeolla Province, South Korea
- Unnan, Shimane, Honshu, Japan; a city
- Yunnan, Singapore
- Vân Nam, a rural communes (xã), Phúc Thọ district, Hanoi, Vietnam

== See also ==
- The dictionary definition of 雲 at Wiktionary
- The dictionary definition of 南 at Wiktionary
