= Xinxing County =

Xinxing 新兴县 Sunhing
- County
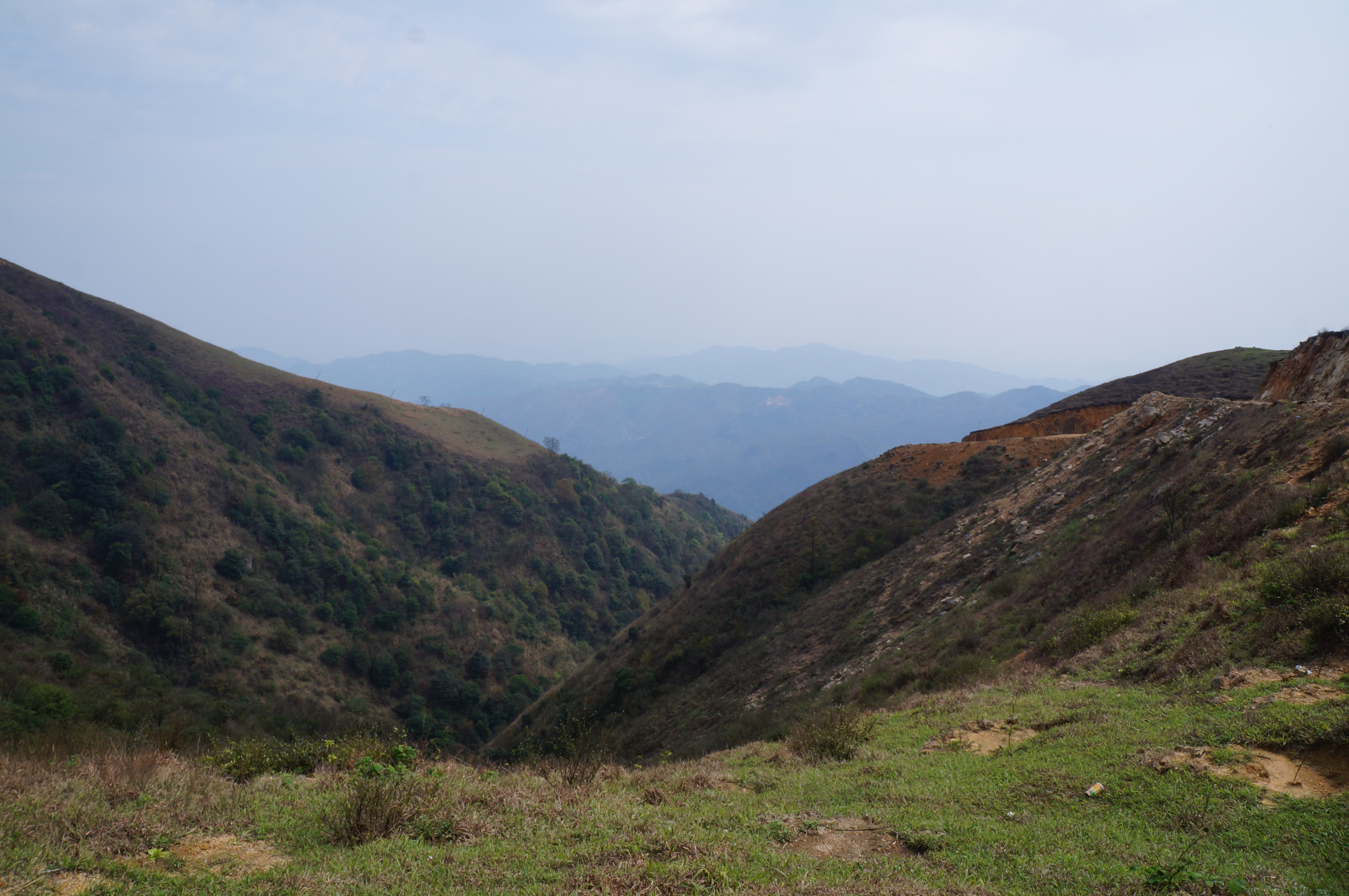

- Location of the seat in Guangdong
- Coordinates: 22°41′46″N 112°13′30″E
- Country: People's Republic of China
- Province: Guangdong
- Prefecture-level city: Yunfu

Area
  - Total: 1,520 km^{2} (590 sq mi)

Population (2020)
  - Total: 430,831
  - Density: 283/km^{2} (734/sq mi)
- Time zone: UTC+8 (China Standard)

Xinxing County
- Traditional Chinese: 新興
- Simplified Chinese: 新兴
- Postal: Sunhing
- Literal meaning: Newly Flourishing
Transcriptions
Standard Mandarin
- Hanyu Pinyin: Xīnxīng
- Wade–Giles: Hsin-hsing

Xinxing County, alternately romanized as Sunhing, (Note: The Postal Map spelling was based on Xinxing's Cantonese pronunciation. Xinxing has also been romanized as Sin Hing, Sin-hing, and Sih-ching.) is a county of the prefecture-level city of Yunfu in the west of Guangdong province, China.

== History ==
Xinxing County was formally established in the third year of da ye era, Sui dynasty (隋大業三年) (607 CE). Under the Qing dynasty (清朝), Xinxing County was administered as part of the commandery of Zhaoqing.

== Notable people ==
- Huineng (惠能) (638–713): sixth ancestor of Chan

== Climate ==
Climate data for Xinxing, elevation 58 m (190 ft), (1991–2020 normals, extremes 1958–present)
Month	Jan	Feb	Mar	Apr	May	Jun	Jul	Aug	Sep	Oct	Nov	Dec	Year
Record high °C (°F)	30.0 (86.0)	32.5 (90.5)	34.2 (93.6)	35.3 (95.5)	37.2 (99.0)	37.5 (99.5)	38.2 (100.8)	38.9 (102.0)	37.8 (100.0)	36.6 (97.9)	34.2 (93.6)	30.4 (86.7)	38.9 (102.0)
Mean daily maximum °C (°F)	18.7 (65.7)	20.3 (68.5)	22.7 (72.9)	27.0 (80.6)	30.6 (87.1)	32.4 (90.3)	33.4 (92.1)	33.3 (91.9)	31.9 (89.4)	29.2 (84.6)	25.3 (77.5)	20.6 (69.1)	27.1 (80.8)
Daily mean °C (°F)	13.6 (56.5)	15.5 (59.9)	18.4 (65.1)	22.7 (72.9)	25.9 (78.6)	27.6 (81.7)	28.3 (82.9)	28.1 (82.6)	26.7 (80.1)	23.5 (74.3)	19.3 (66.7)	14.8 (58.6)	22.0 (71.7)
Mean daily minimum °C (°F)	10.2 (50.4)	12.2 (54.0)	15.5 (59.9)	19.7 (67.5)	22.8 (73.0)	24.6 (76.3)	25.1 (77.2)	25.0 (77.0)	23.5 (74.3)	19.8 (67.6)	15.4 (59.7)	11.0 (51.8)	18.7 (65.7)
Record low °C (°F)	−2.3 (27.9)	0.3 (32.5)	2.7 (36.9)	8.6 (47.5)	13.3 (55.9)	16.8 (62.2)	21.0 (69.8)	20.4 (68.7)	14.0 (57.2)	6.1 (43.0)	1.4 (34.5)	−2.5 (27.5)	−2.5 (27.5)
Average precipitation mm (inches)	52.3 (2.06)	50.4 (1.98)	77.0 (3.03)	156.7 (6.17)	224.9 (8.85)	266.0 (10.47)	230.7 (9.08)	255.4 (10.06)	190.8 (7.51)	71.6 (2.82)	43.1 (1.70)	37.4 (1.47)	1,656.3 (65.2)
Average precipitation days (≥ 0.1 mm)	8.6	10.2	15.6	15.4	18.5	20.4	17.8	17.6	12.5	6.2	5.9	5.8	154.5
Average relative humidity (%)	81	83	85	85	85	86	84	85	84	80	80	78	83
Mean monthly sunshine hours	102.8	81.2	64.5	86.3	127.8	145.5	184.8	175.0	162.4	175.7	150.0	132.3	1,588.3
Percentage possible sunshine	30	25	17	23	31	36	45	44	45	49	46	40	36
Source: China Meteorological Administrationall-time October record
