= Jinming District =

Coordinates: 34°47′29″N 114°22′20″E

- District

Chinese transcription(s)
- Interactive map of Jinming District
- Country: China
- Province: Henan
- Prefecture: Kaifeng
- Time zone: UTC+8 (China Standard)

Jinming District was a district of Henan, China. It was under the administration of Kaifeng city. In 2005, it was merged with Longting District.
