= Yunfu =

Yunfu 云浮市
- Prefecture-level city
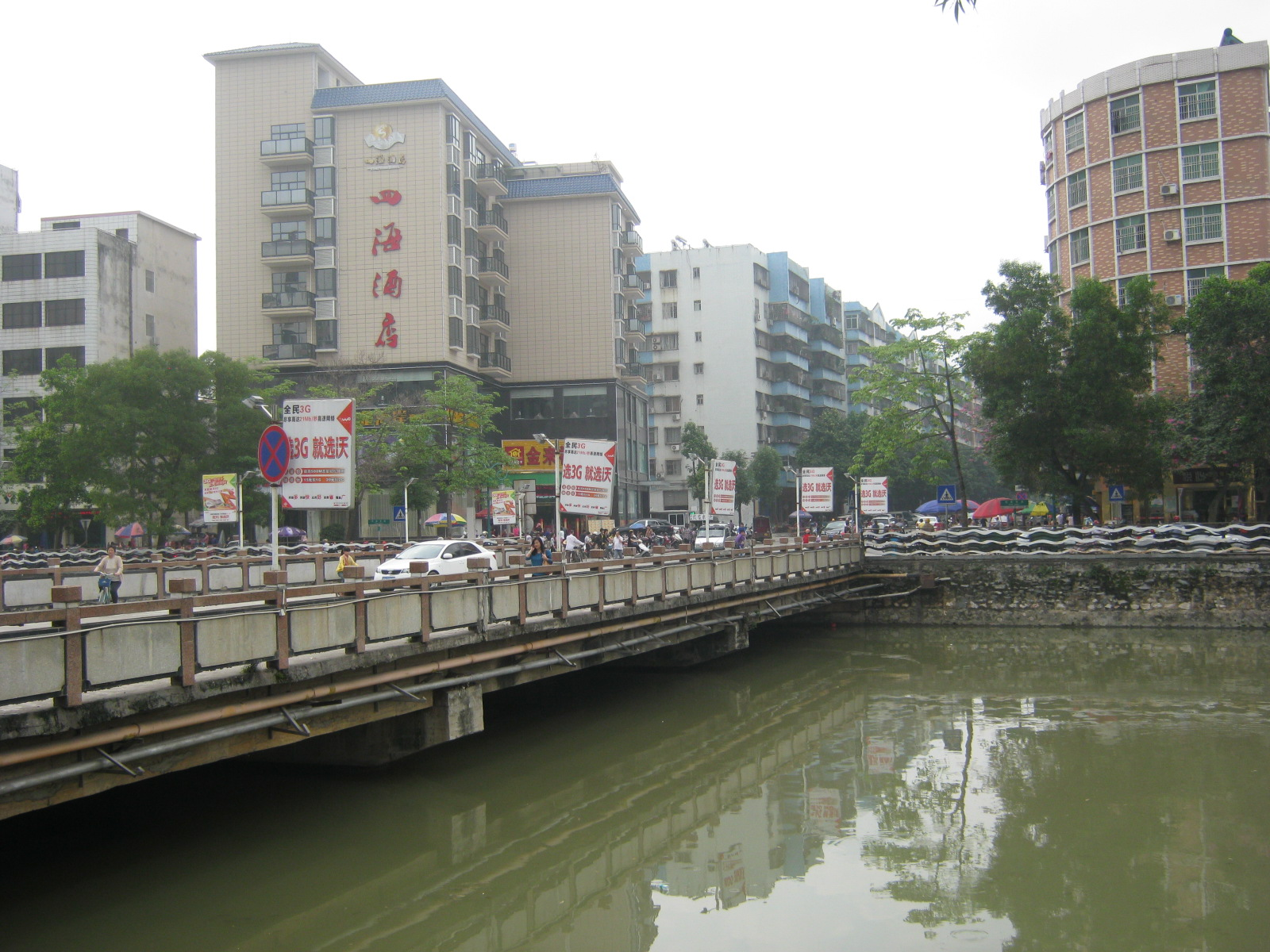
- Yunfu in 2013. Bridge over Nanshan river.

- Location of Yunfu in Guangdong
- Interactive map of Yunfu
- Location of the city center in Guangdong Yunfu (China)
- Country: People's Republic of China
- Province: Guangdong
- County-level divisions: 5
- Township divisions: 112
- Incorporated as Linyun County: 111 CE
- Yunfu County formed: May 1914
- Promoted to prefecture-level city: April 5, 1994
- City seat: Yuncheng District

Government

Area
  - Prefecture-level city: 7,813.4 km^{2} (3,016.8 sq mi)
- Elevation: 133 m (436 ft)

Population (2020 census)
  - Prefecture-level city: 2,383,400
  - Density: 305.04/km^{2} (790.05/sq mi)
  - Urban: 369,321

GDP
  - Prefecture-level city: CN¥ 113.9 billion US$ 17.7 billion
  - Per capita: CN¥ 47,685; US$ 7,391
- Time zone: China Standard
- Postal codes: 527300 (Urban area) 527100, 527200, 527400, 527500 (Other areas)
- Area code: 766
- ISO 3166 code: CN-GD-53
- License Plate: 粤W
- Major Nationalities: Han
- Website: Official website

Yunfu
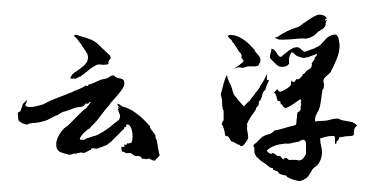
- "Yunfu", as written in Chinese calligraphy
- Simplified Chinese: 云浮
- Traditional Chinese: 雲浮
- Hanyu Pinyin: Yúnfú
- Cantonese Yale: Wàhnfàuh
- Postal: Wanfow
- Literal meaning: Cloud Drift
Transcriptions
Standard Mandarin
- Hanyu Pinyin: Yúnfú
- Gwoyeu Romatzyh: Yunfwu
- Wade–Giles: Yün^{2}-fu^{2}
- IPA: [y̌n.fǔ]
Yue: Cantonese
- Yale Romanization: Wàhnfàuh
- Jyutping: Wan4fau4
- IPA: [wɐn˩.fɐw˩]

Yunfu (simplified Chinese: 云浮; traditional Chinese: 雲浮; pinyin: Yúnfú), formerly romanized as Wanfow, and historically known as Dong'an (simplified Chinese: 东安; traditional Chinese: 東安; pinyin: Dōng'ān), which was formerly romanized as Tong On, from 1578 to 1913, is a prefecture-level city in western Guangdong province, People's Republic of China. It borders Zhaoqing to the north, Foshan to the east, Jiangmen to the southeast, Yangjiang to the south, Maoming to the southwest, and the autonomous region of Guangxi to the west. The city spans an area of 7,786.64 square kilometres (3,006.44 mi^{2}), and has a population of 2,383,400 according to a 2021 publication by the city government.

== History ==
The area of present-day Yunfu belonged to the Baiyue prior to the advent of the Qin dynasty, when much of Yunfu came under the jurisdiction of Guilin Commandery, while some of the area belonged to Nanhai Commandery. During portions of the Han dynasty, the area belonged to the kingdom of Nanyue. Following the fall of the Nanyue in 111 CE, the area of present-day Xinxing County was incorporated into the Western Han dynasty as Linyun County (Chinese: 临允县).

=== Jin dynasty ===
Under the Jin dynasty, in 280 CE, the area of present-day Yunan County was organized as Duluo County (Chinese: 都罗县). In 349 CE, the area of present-day Yunan County was reorganized as Jinhua County (Chinese: 晋化县). Two years later, the area of present-day Xinxing County was reorganized as Xinning Commandery, which governed three counties: Xinxing County (Chinese: 新兴县), Nanxing County (Chinese: 南兴县), and Dandie County (Chinese: 单牒县). During the final years of the Jin dynasty, from 416 CE to 420 CE, Longxiang County (Chinese: 龙乡县) and Furuan County (Chinese: 夫阮县) were established in present-day Luoding.

=== Northern and Southern dynasties ===
During the Northern and Southern dynasties period, the area of present-day Yunfu was governed by the Southern Song dynasty from 420 CE to 479 CE, then by the Southern Qi dynasty from 479 CE to 502 CE, and finally by the Liang dynasty from 502 CE to 557 CE. From 557 CE to 589 CE, the area was ruled by the Chen dynasty.

=== Later dynasties ===
The area was incorporated into the Tang dynasty in 618 CE. Following the Five Dynasties and Ten Kingdoms period, the area was conquered by the Song dynasty (not to be confused with the aforementioned Song dynasty which ruled portions of Southern China during the 5th century CE).

=== Republic of China ===
Shortly after the creation of the Republic of China in 1912, republican officials reorganized the area multiple times. In January 1914, Xining County was renamed to Yunan County (which it is still called today), and in May 1914 Dong'an County was renamed to Yunfu County.

=== People's Republic of China ===
Yunfu was promoted to a prefecture-level city on April 5, 1994.

In September 2014, Yun'an was promoted from a county to a district.

== Geography ==
67.39% of Yunfu's area is forested. The Xi River runs through Yunfu.

=== Climate ===
Yunfu is considered sub-tropical and enjoys fine weather year-round, characterized by mild air temperatures, plentiful rainfall and sunshine, with an annual average temperature of 22 °C, annual average rainfall of 1,580mm and annual average sunshine hours of 1,418. The time-space distribution of rainfall is uneven in a year. It is overcast and dry in spring, hot and rainy in the summer, cool in autumn, and dry and sunny in winter.

Climate data for Yunfu, elevation 101 m (331 ft), (1991–2020 normals, extremes 1967–present)
Month	Jan	Feb	Mar	Apr	May	Jun	Jul	Aug	Sep	Oct	Nov	Dec	Year
Record high °C (°F)	28.7 (83.7)	32.6 (90.7)	34.0 (93.2)	35.8 (96.4)	36.1 (97.0)	37.5 (99.5)	38.9 (102.0)	39.1 (102.4)	38.1 (100.6)	35.3 (95.5)	33.3 (91.9)	29.6 (85.3)	39.1 (102.4)
Mean daily maximum °C (°F)	18.1 (64.6)	19.8 (67.6)	22.2 (72.0)	26.7 (80.1)	30.4 (86.7)	32.5 (90.5)	33.5 (92.3)	33.2 (91.8)	31.6 (88.9)	29.0 (84.2)	24.9 (76.8)	20.2 (68.4)	26.8 (80.3)
Daily mean °C (°F)	13.2 (55.8)	15.1 (59.2)	18.0 (64.4)	22.4 (72.3)	25.7 (78.3)	27.6 (81.7)	28.3 (82.9)	28.0 (82.4)	26.6 (79.9)	23.5 (74.3)	19.3 (66.7)	14.7 (58.5)	21.9 (71.4)
Mean daily minimum °C (°F)	10.0 (50.0)	12.0 (53.6)	15.2 (59.4)	19.4 (66.9)	22.5 (72.5)	24.5 (76.1)	24.9 (76.8)	24.7 (76.5)	23.2 (73.8)	19.7 (67.5)	15.4 (59.7)	11.0 (51.8)	18.5 (65.4)
Record low °C (°F)	−1.4 (29.5)	2.1 (35.8)	2.9 (37.2)	8.6 (47.5)	13.3 (55.9)	17.8 (64.0)	20.9 (69.6)	21.9 (71.4)	15.1 (59.2)	9.3 (48.7)	3.8 (38.8)	−1.3 (29.7)	−1.4 (29.5)
Average precipitation mm (inches)	54.5 (2.15)	48.1 (1.89)	88.4 (3.48)	167.5 (6.59)	217.0 (8.54)	242.8 (9.56)	211.2 (8.31)	251.2 (9.89)	180.3 (7.10)	69.4 (2.73)	43.2 (1.70)	38.7 (1.52)	1,612.3 (63.46)
Average precipitation days (≥ 0.1 mm)	9.1	10.5	15.5	16.1	17.8	19.3	17.4	17.7	12.5	5.8	5.9	6.3	153.9
Average relative humidity (%)	78	80	83	83	83	83	80	82	80	75	75	74	80
Mean monthly sunshine hours	87.8	71.3	56.8	80.3	118.8	141.3	177.2	170.6	156.6	165.3	142.4	126.4	1,494.8
Percentage possible sunshine	26	22	15	21	29	35	43	43	43	46	43	38	34
Source: China Meteorological Administrationall-time record low and all-time July record high

== Administration ==
The prefecture-level city of Yunfu administers 5 county-level divisions, including 2 district, 1 county-level city and 2 counties.

Map
Name	Simplified Chinese	Hanyu Pinyin	Population (2010 census)	Area (km^{2})	Density (/km^{2})
Yuncheng District	云城区	Yúnchéng Qū	314,188	762	412
Yun'an District	云安区	Yún'ān Qū	269,736	1,231	219
Xinxing County	新兴县	Xīnxīng Xiàn	428,410	1,520	282
Yunan County	郁南县	Yùnán Xiàn	388,727	1,966	198
Luoding	罗定市	Luódìng Shì	959,067	2,300	417

== Demographics ==
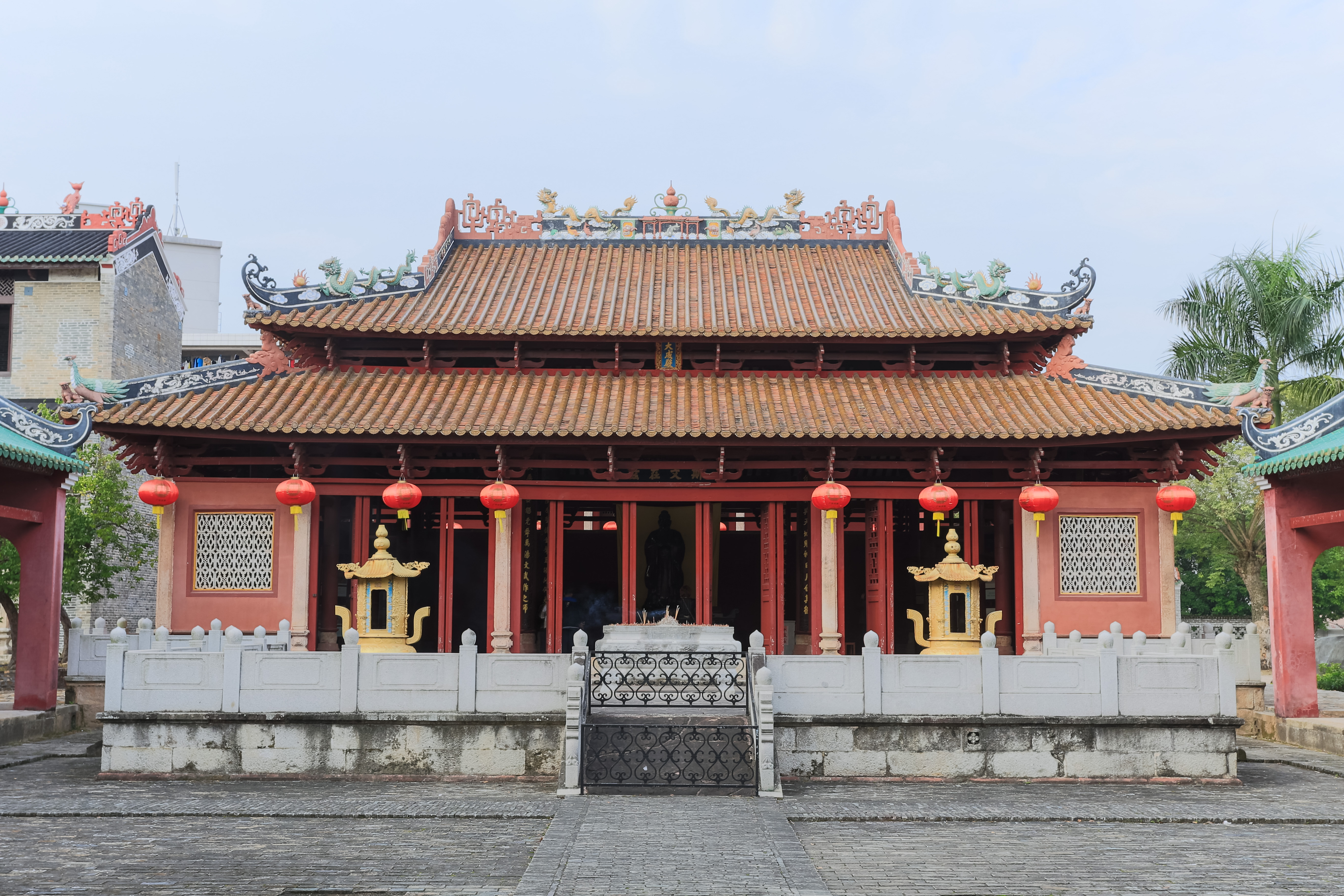
A Confucian temple in Luoding

According to the city government, 420,000 overseas Chinese hail from Yunfu.

=== Ethnicity ===
Yunfu is home to 39 ethnic minorities, which comprise a total population of 14,038. The largest ethnic minorities in Yunfu are the Zhuang, Yao, Dong, and the Miao. While many of Yunfu's ethnic minorities recently moved to the city due to marriage and work, there are large concentrations of indigenous minorities in two villages in Yunfu: Hejiang Village (Chinese: 合江村) in Jiayi, Luoding, and Dalin Village (Chinese: 大林村) in Baozhu, Yunan County.

=== Language ===
Several languages are commonly spoken in Yunfu, including the Yunfu Dialect (Chinese: 云浮白话) of Cantonese, Hakka, Min-nan, and the Taigu Dialect (Chinese: 㑷古话). The Yunfu Dialect is the most commonly spoken in Yunfu, followed by Hakka. The city's Min-nan speakers are concentrated in certain areas, including the towns of Liantan and Dongba in Yunan County, Zhaitang Village (Chinese: 寨塘村) in the town of Fulin, Yun'an District, and the towns of Taiping, Luoping, Chuanbu, and Liangtang in Luoding. Speakers of the Taigu Dialect are largely concentrated in the township-level divisions of Weidi, Sulong Subdistrict, Taiping, Luoping, Huashi, Luojing, Fenjie, Pingtang, and Shuangdong Subdistrict in Luoding.

== Economy ==
=== Natural resources ===
Yunfu has a total land area of 7,785.16 square kilometres (3,005.87 mi^{2}). More than 670 types of plants used in traditional Chinese medicine are found in Yunfu.

Yunfu's city government states that there are over 50 types of mineral resources in Yunfu, including gold, silver, copper, iron, marble, granite, limestone, and pyrite. Other proven minerals in Yunfu include tin, lead, zinc and manganese, sillimanite, dolomite, barite, talc, kaolin, limestone, clay, rammell, potassium feldspar, and mineral water. The area's particularly large deposits of pyrite makes it China's largest sulfide producing region. Yunfu serves as a regional center of stone mining and stone carving.

=== Tourism ===
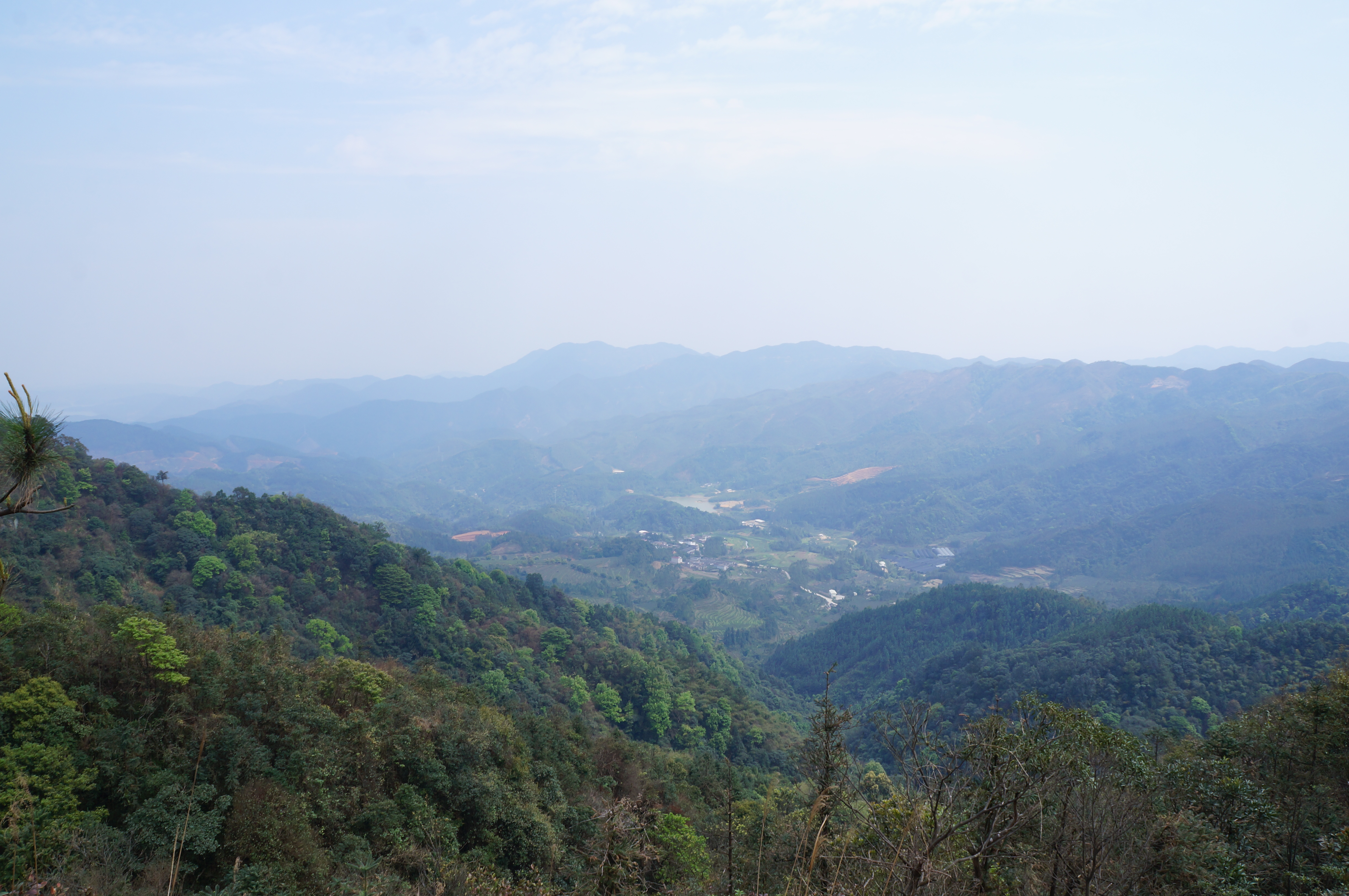
A view from Tianlu Mountain in Xinxing County

Major tourist attractions in the city include the Sixth Patriarch's Hometown Tourist Resort (Chinese: 六祖故里旅游度假区), Jinshuitai Hot Springs Scenic Area (Chinese: 金水台温泉景区), Tianlu Mountain Tourist Resort (Chinese: 天露山旅游度假区), and Panlong Cave Scenic Area (Chinese: 蟠龙洞景区).

== Education ==
Yunfu is home to three tertiary education institutions, enrolling 13,000 students. The city has 121 secondary schools, including 15 vocational schools, enrolling 164,100 students. Yunfu also has 174 primary schools with 258,600 students.

== Culture ==
The city has 6 art galleries and cultural centers, 6 public libraries, and 5 museums.

== Healthcare ==
Yunfu has 89 medical institutions, with 10,364 beds.

== Transportation ==
With 324 National Highway running through the whole prefecture, cement-paved roads are accessible to each single township and village. Guangzhou-Wuzhou Expressway linking Guangdong and Guangxi is also connected to Yunfu which will further be united with Yulin and Wuzhou in Guangxi as well as the expressway network in southwest China. Sanshui-Maoming Railway also passes the whole municipality, which will be eventually linked to Luoyang-Zhanjiang Railway in 2008.

The Xi River has 100 kilometers of waterway, enabling direct cargo freight to Hong Kong. The Yunfu New Port (Chinese: 云浮新港), along the Xi River, serves as Guangdong's largest inland port.

== Notable people ==
- Gan Zhuotang, Communist Party politician
- Cai Tingkai, National Revolutionary Army general
- Ye Jizhuang, Communist Party politician
- Li Wan, Second Guangzhou Uprising protester
- Huineng, Chan Buddhist patriarch
- Deng Fa, Communist Party politician
