= Yunan County =

Yunan 郁南县
- County
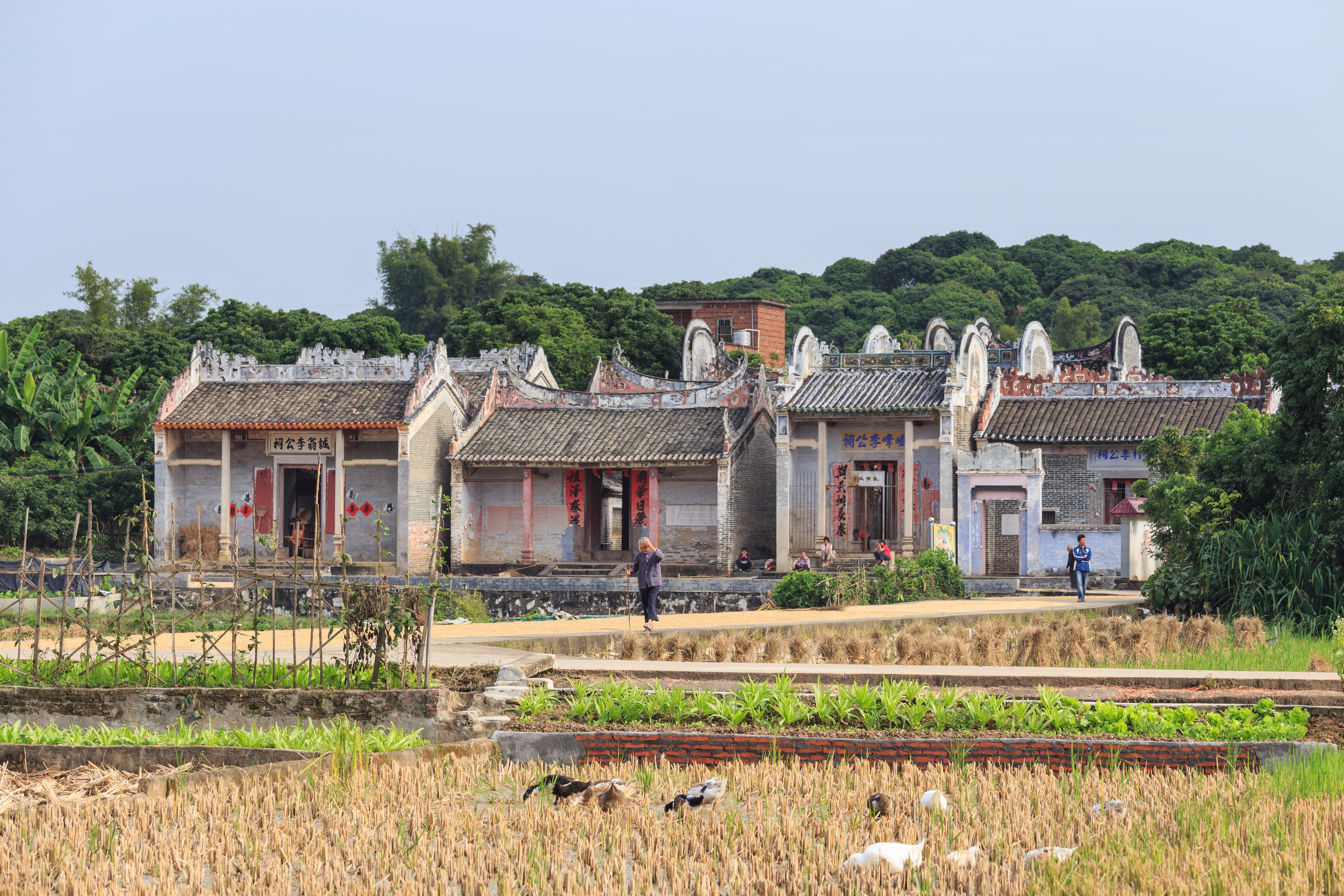
- Ancient Buildings in Dawan

- Location of the seat in Guangdong
- Coordinates: 23°14′05″N 111°32′07″E
- Country: People's Republic of China
- Province: Guangdong
- Prefecture-level city: Yunfu
- County seat: Ducheng (都城镇)

Area
  - County: 1,966 km^{2} (759 sq mi)

Population (2020)
  - County: 532,679
  - Density: 270.9/km^{2} (701.7/sq mi)
  - Urban: 167,230
- Time zone: UTC+8 (China Standard)
- Postal code: 527100
- Area code: 0766
- Website: www.gdyunan.gov.cn

Yunan County (postal: Watnam; simplified Chinese: 郁南县; traditional Chinese: 鬱南縣; pinyin: Yùnán Xiàn) is a county located in the west of Guangdong Province, China, bordering Guangxi to the west. It is under the administration of the prefecture-level city of Yunfu. As of 2020, Yunan County has a population of 532,679.

== Administrative divisions ==
As of 2020, Yunan County administers 15 towns and 4 township-level tree farms.

=== Towns ===
Yunan County's 15 towns are Ducheng (都城镇), Pingtai (平台镇), Guiwei (桂圩镇), Tongmen (通门镇), Jiancheng (建城镇), Baozhu (宝珠镇), Dafang (大方镇), Qianguan (千官镇), Dawan (大湾镇), Hekou (河口镇), Songgui (宋桂镇), Dongba (东坝镇), Liantan (连滩镇), Lidong (历洞镇), and Nanjiangkou (南江口镇).

=== Other township-level divisions ===
Yunan County has 4 tree farms (林场; lín chǎng) which function as township-level divisions: Xijiang Tree Farm (西江林场), Tongmen Tree Farm (通门林场), Dali Tree Farm (大历林场), and Tongle Tree Farm (同乐林场).

== Climate ==
Climate data for Yunan, elevation 71 m (233 ft), (1991–2020 normals, extremes 1955–present)
Month	Jan	Feb	Mar	Apr	May	Jun	Jul	Aug	Sep	Oct	Nov	Dec	Year
Record high °C (°F)	29.7 (85.5)	33.7 (92.7)	35.1 (95.2)	36.7 (98.1)	38.6 (101.5)	38.0 (100.4)	39.2 (102.6)	39.5 (103.1)	38.0 (100.4)	37.0 (98.6)	33.6 (92.5)	30.0 (86.0)	39.5 (103.1)
Mean daily maximum °C (°F)	17.8 (64.0)	19.7 (67.5)	22.3 (72.1)	27.2 (81.0)	31.0 (87.8)	32.9 (91.2)	34.2 (93.6)	33.9 (93.0)	32.3 (90.1)	29.4 (84.9)	25.1 (77.2)	19.9 (67.8)	27.1 (80.9)
Daily mean °C (°F)	12.9 (55.2)	15.0 (59.0)	18.1 (64.6)	22.8 (73.0)	26.1 (79.0)	28.0 (82.4)	29.0 (84.2)	28.6 (83.5)	27.2 (81.0)	23.8 (74.8)	19.2 (66.6)	14.3 (57.7)	22.1 (71.8)
Mean daily minimum °C (°F)	9.6 (49.3)	11.8 (53.2)	15.1 (59.2)	19.7 (67.5)	22.9 (73.2)	25.0 (77.0)	25.6 (78.1)	25.4 (77.7)	23.7 (74.7)	19.9 (67.8)	15.2 (59.4)	10.6 (51.1)	18.7 (65.7)
Record low °C (°F)	−3.1 (26.4)	1.4 (34.5)	2.7 (36.9)	8.2 (46.8)	13.6 (56.5)	17.8 (64.0)	21.7 (71.1)	21.2 (70.2)	15.1 (59.2)	6.2 (43.2)	2.8 (37.0)	−2.0 (28.4)	−3.1 (26.4)
Average precipitation mm (inches)	58.7 (2.31)	46.3 (1.82)	94.7 (3.73)	153.6 (6.05)	242.1 (9.53)	252.7 (9.95)	164.7 (6.48)	192.2 (7.57)	117.4 (4.62)	44.1 (1.74)	44.6 (1.76)	38.8 (1.53)	1,449.9 (57.09)
Average precipitation days (≥ 0.1 mm)	9.4	9.9	14.7	14.8	19.1	19.9	16.8	16.5	11.2	5.6	6.4	7.1	151.4
Average relative humidity (%)	78	79	81	80	80	81	78	79	78	75	75	75	78
Mean monthly sunshine hours	89.2	77.9	64.7	96.3	141.1	160.1	211.3	199.4	178.6	184.8	150.8	127.6	1,681.8
Percentage possible sunshine	27	24	17	25	34	39	51	50	49	52	46	39	38
Source: China Meteorological Administrationall-time record lowall-time May record highall-time October record

== Demographics ==
Historical population
Year	Pop.	±% p.a.
1949	219,596	—
1959	251,306	+1.36%
1969	313,723	+2.24%
1979	367,439	+1.59%
1982	387,339	+1.77%
1990	439,497	+1.59%
2000	475,908	+0.80%
2020	532,679	+0.57%

As of the end of 2020, Yunan County has a total population of 532,679.

=== Vital statistics ===
In 2020, Yunan County recorded 5,936 births (11.14 per thousand) and 4,067 deaths (7.63 per thousand), giving the county a rate of natural increase of 3.51‰.

=== Sex ratio ===
As of 2020, Yunan County is home to 282,705 males and 249,974 females, giving the county a sex ratio of 113.09 males per 100 females.

=== Urbanization ===
As of 2020, 167,230 of Yunan County's residents lived in urban areas, giving the county an urbanization rate of 31.39%.

== Economy ==
The gross domestic product of Yunan County totals 12.338 billion RMB as of 2020, a 2.9% increase from the previous year. Of this, 3.032 billion RMB (24.57%) came from the county's primary sector, 2.802 billion RMB (22.71%) came from the county's secondary sector, and 6.504 billion RMB (52.72%) came from the county's tertiary sector. As of 2020, the annual per capita disposable income of the county's urban residents totals 27092 RMB, and totals 17,102 RMB for the county's rural residents, reflecting a 5.7% and 7.0% increase from the previous year, respectively.

== Notable people ==
- Pang Yusheng (Chinese: 龐遇聖), Ming dynasty doctor
- Zhu Jiang (Chinese: 朱江), politician and staff officer during Second Sino-Japanese war
