= Yuncheng, Yunfu =

Yuncheng 云城区
- District
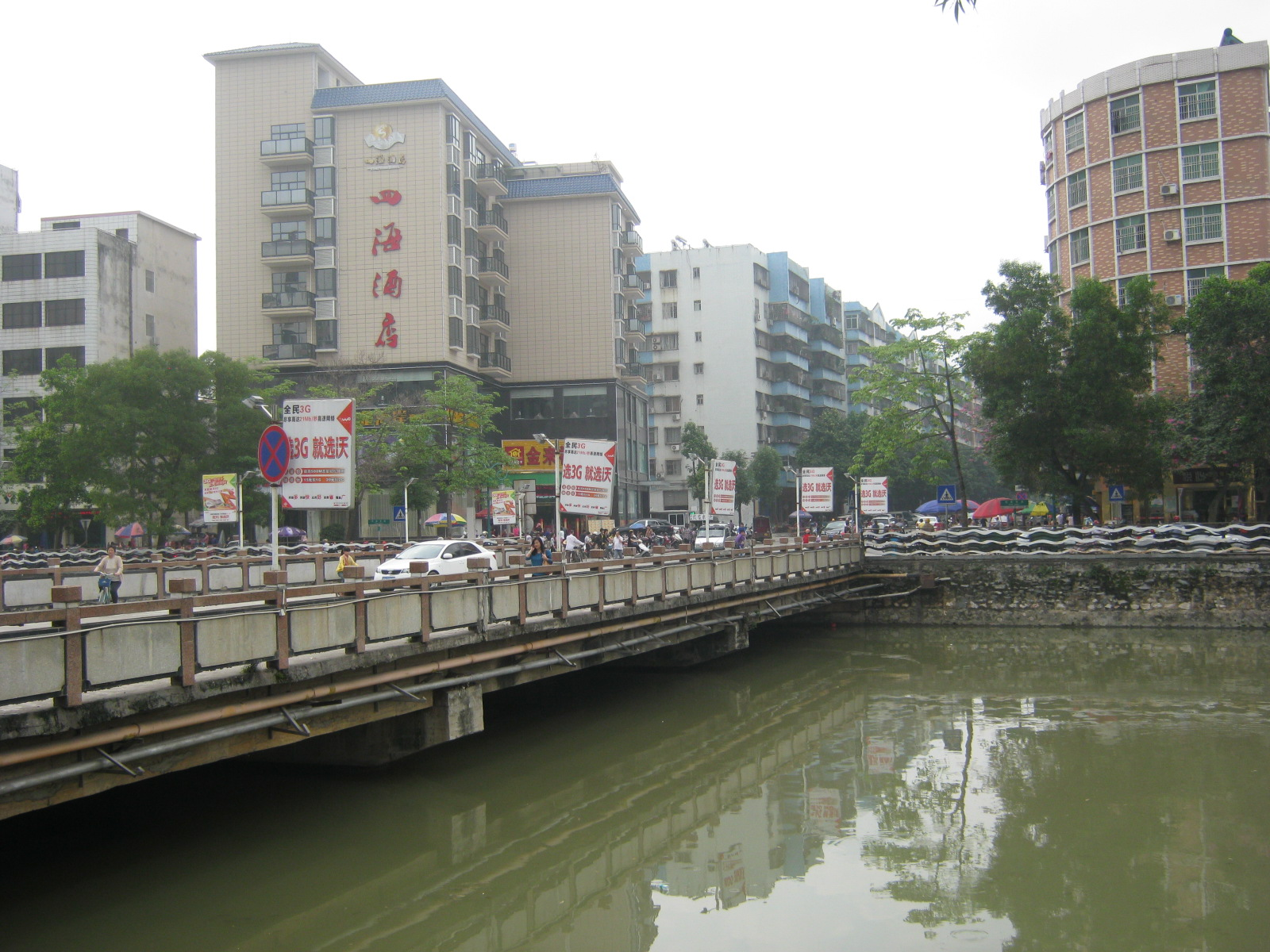

- Location in Guangdong
- Coordinates (Yuncheng District government): 22°55′41″N 112°02′38″E
- Country: People's Republic of China
- Province: Guangdong
- Prefecture-level city: Yunfu

Area
  - Total: 762 km^{2} (294 sq mi)

Population (2010)
  - Total: 314,188
  - Density: 412/km^{2} (1,070/sq mi)
- Time zone: UTC+8 (China Standard)
- Postal code: 527300
- Area code: 0766

Yuncheng District (simplified Chinese: 云城区; traditional Chinese: 雲城區; pinyin: Yúnchéng Qū) is a district of the city of Yunfu, Guangdong Province, China.
