= List of rivers of Hunan =

This is a list of rivers of Hunan.

== List ==
English name	Chinese name	Drainage basin	Length	Headstream	River mouth	Notes
Xiang River	湘江	94,660-square-kilometre (36,550 sq mi)	856-kilometre (532 mi)	Longmenjie (龙门界), Lingui County, Guangxi	Haohekou (浩河口), Xiangyin County	
Xiao River	潇水	12,099-square-kilometre (4,671 sq mi)	354-kilometre (220 mi)	Mount Yezhu (野猪山), Lanshan County	Ping Island, Yongzhou	
Chongling River	舂陵水	6,623-square-kilometre (2,557 sq mi)	223-kilometre (139 mi)	Mount Renxing (人形山), Lanshan County	Jiaohekou (茭河口, Changning	
Lei River	耒水	11,783-square-kilometre (4,549 sq mi)	453-kilometre (281 mi)	Yanzhubao (烟竹堡), Guidong County	Leihekou (耒河口), Hengyang	
Mi River	洣水	10,305-square-kilometre (3,979 sq mi)	296-kilometre (184 mi)	Tianzhangchong (天障冲), Yanling County	Mihekou (洣河口), Hengdong County	
Lushui River	渌水	5,675-square-kilometre (2,191 sq mi)	166-kilometre (103 mi)	Qianlaling (千拉岭), Pingxiang, Jiangxi	Lukou Town, Zhuzhou County	
Lianshui River	涟水	7,155-square-kilometre (2,763 sq mi)	224-kilometre (139 mi)	Mount Guanyin (观音山), Xinshao County	Xianghekou (湘河口), Xiangtan County	
Liuyang River	浏阳河	5,960-square-kilometre (2,300 sq mi)	222-kilometre (138 mi)	Hengshan'ao (横山坳), Liuyang	Chenjiawuchang (陈家屋场), Changsha	
Miluo River	汨罗江	5,543-square-kilometre (2,140 sq mi)	253-kilometre (157 mi)	Lishuguo (梨树埚), Xiushui County, Jiangxi	Mount Leishi (磊石山), Xiangyin County	
Zi River	资水	28,142-square-kilometre (10,866 sq mi)	653-kilometre (406 mi)	Huangmajie (黄马界), Chengbu County	Ganxigang (干溪缸), Yiyang	
Yuan River	沅江	89,163-square-kilometre (34,426 sq mi)	1,033-kilometre (642 mi)	Jiguanling (鸡冠岭), Duyun, Guizhou	Deshan (德山), Changde	
Qu River	渠水	6,772-square-kilometre (2,615 sq mi)	285-kilometre (177 mi)	Dizhuanpo (地转坡), Liping County, Guizhou	Tuokou Town, Hongjiang	
Wu River	潕水	10,334-square-kilometre (3,990 sq mi)	444-kilometre (276 mi)	Luoliutang (罗柳塘), Fuquan County, Guizhou	Qiancheng Town, Hongjiang	
You River	酉水	18,530-square-kilometre (7,150 sq mi)	477-kilometre (296 mi)	Mount Youyuan (酉源山), Xuan'en County, Hubei	Yuanling Town, Yuanling	
Chen River	辰水	7,536-square-kilometre (2,910 sq mi)	145-kilometre (90 mi)	Yangtou (漾头), Tongren, Guizhou	Xiaolukou (小路口), Chenxi County	
Lishui River	澧水	18,496-square-kilometre (7,141 sq mi)	388-kilometre (241 mi)	Shanmujie (杉木界), Sangzhi County	Xiaodukou (小渡口), Jinshi	
Lou River	溇水	5,048-square-kilometre (1,949 sq mi)	250-kilometre (160 mi)	Qiya (七垭), Hefeng County, Hubei	Lingyang Town, Cili County	
Zheng River	蒸水	3,470-square-kilometre (1,340 sq mi)	200-kilometre (120 mi)	Zhengyuan Village (蒸源村), Shaodong County	Shiguzui (石鼓咀), Hengyang	
Guan River	灌江	2,285.7-square-kilometre (882.5 sq mi)	176.63-kilometre (109.75 mi)	Liziping (犁子坪), Guanyang County, Guangxi	Shuinan Village (水南村), Quanzhou County	
Laodao River	捞刀河	2,543-square-kilometre (982 sq mi)	149.35-kilometre (92.80 mi)	Shizhu Peak (石柱峰), Liuyang	Jiangwan (江湾), Changsha	
Wei River	沩水	2,125-square-kilometre (820 sq mi)	117.2-kilometre (72.8 mi)	Mount Wei (沩山), Ningxiang	Wangcheng District, Changsha	
Bai River	白水	1,810-square-kilometre (700 sq mi)	117-kilometre (73 mi)	Baishui Township, Guiyang County	Guanzikou (罐子口), Qiyang County	
Qi River	祁水	1,685-square-kilometre (651 sq mi)	114-kilometre (71 mi)	Mount Siming (四明山), Qidong County	Shuifumiao (水府庙), Qiyang County	
Juan River	涓水	1,764-square-kilometre (681 sq mi)	103-kilometre (64 mi)	Mount Jiufeng (九峰山), Shuangfeng County	Yisuhe Town, Xiangtan	
Luhong River	芦洪江	1,076-square-kilometre (415 sq mi)	80-kilometre (50 mi)	Lishuchong (栗木冲), Dong'an County	Shuijiangkou (水江口), Yongzhou	
