= Taihe =

Taihe (Chinese: 太和 unless otherwise noted) may refer to:

== Locations in China ==
- Taihe County, Anhui, in Fuyang, Anhui
- Taihe County, Jiangxi (泰和县), in Ji'an, Jiangxi
- Taihe District, Jinzhou, Liaoning
- Taihe Tujia Ethnic Township, in Fengjie County, Chongqing

=== Subdistricts ===
- Taihe Subdistrict, Xuyi County, in Xuyi County, Jiangsu
- Taihe Subdistrict, Jinzhou, in Taihe District
- Taihe Subdistrict, Shehong, in Shehong, Sichuan
- Taihe Subdistrict, Kunming, in Guandu District, Kunming, Yunnan

=== Towns ===
- Taihe, Hechuan District, in Hechuan District, Chongqing
- Taihe, Guangzhou, in Guangzhou, Guangdong
- Taihe, Qingyuan, in Qingyuan, Guangdong
- Taihe, Henan, in Sheqi County, Henan
- Taihe, Hubei, in Ezhou, Hubei
- Taihe, Guiyang County, in Guiyang County, Hunan
- Taihe, Yongxing County, in Yongxing County, Hunan
- Taihe, Nanfeng County, in Nanfeng County, Jiangxi
- Taihe, Heishan County, in Heishan County, Liaoning
- Taihe, Shandong (太河), in Zibo, Shandong
- Taihe, Linshui County, in Linshui County, Sichuan
- Taihe, Meishan, in Meishan, Sichuan
- Taihe, Xichang, in Xichang, Sichuan

== Historical eras ==
- Taihe (227–233), era name used by Cao Rui, emperor of Cao Wei
- Taihe (328–330), era name used by Shi Le, emperor of Later Zhao
- Taihe (344–346), era name used by Li Shi (emperor), emperor of Cheng Han
- Taihe (366–371), era name used by Emperor Fei of Jin
- Taihe (477–499), era name used by Emperor Xiaowen of Northern Wei
- Taihe (泰和, 1201–1208), era name used by Emperor Zhangzong of Jin

== Other topics ==
- Princess Taihe (fl. 821–843), Tang dynasty princess and a Huigu Khatun by marriage
- Hall of Supreme Harmony or Taihe Hall, the largest hall within the Forbidden City in Beijing
- Taihe Institute, a leading Chinese think tank based in Beijing
