= Geography of Hunan =

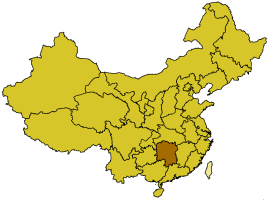
Location of Hunan province

Hunan is a landlocked province situated in the Central China and central portion of Yangtze River, Hunan spans from 108°47′ to 114°15′ longitude and 24°39′ to 30°8′. Hunan shares land borders with Jiangxi to the east, Guangdong and Guangxi to the south, Guizhou to the west, Chongqing to the northwest, and Hubei to the north. Hunan is 667-kilometre (414 mi) from east to west, 774-kilometre (481 mi) from south to north, with a land area of 211,800-square-kilometre (81,800 sq mi), making it the 10th largest province in China. Hunan is ringed on three sides by mountains and hills, it looks like a horseshoe. Of Hunan's total area, 51.2% consists of hilly area, 13.9% consists of basin, 13.1% consists of plain, 15.4% consists of hills, 6.4% consists of water.

== Political geography ==
As of December 2015, Hunan is divided into 109 counties, districts and cities, and has 524 towns and townships. Approximately 11% of Hunan residents live in Changsha, which had a population of 7,311,500 of the 2017 Census. Zhuzhou ranked 2nd and Xiangtan ranked 3rd respectively.

== Province boundaries ==
Located in the middle reaches of the Yangtze River in South Central China, Hunan is a southern province, bordered to the north by Hubei, to the east by Jiangxi, to the south by Guangdong and Guangxi, to the west by Guizhou, and to the northwest by Chongqing.

== Mountains ==
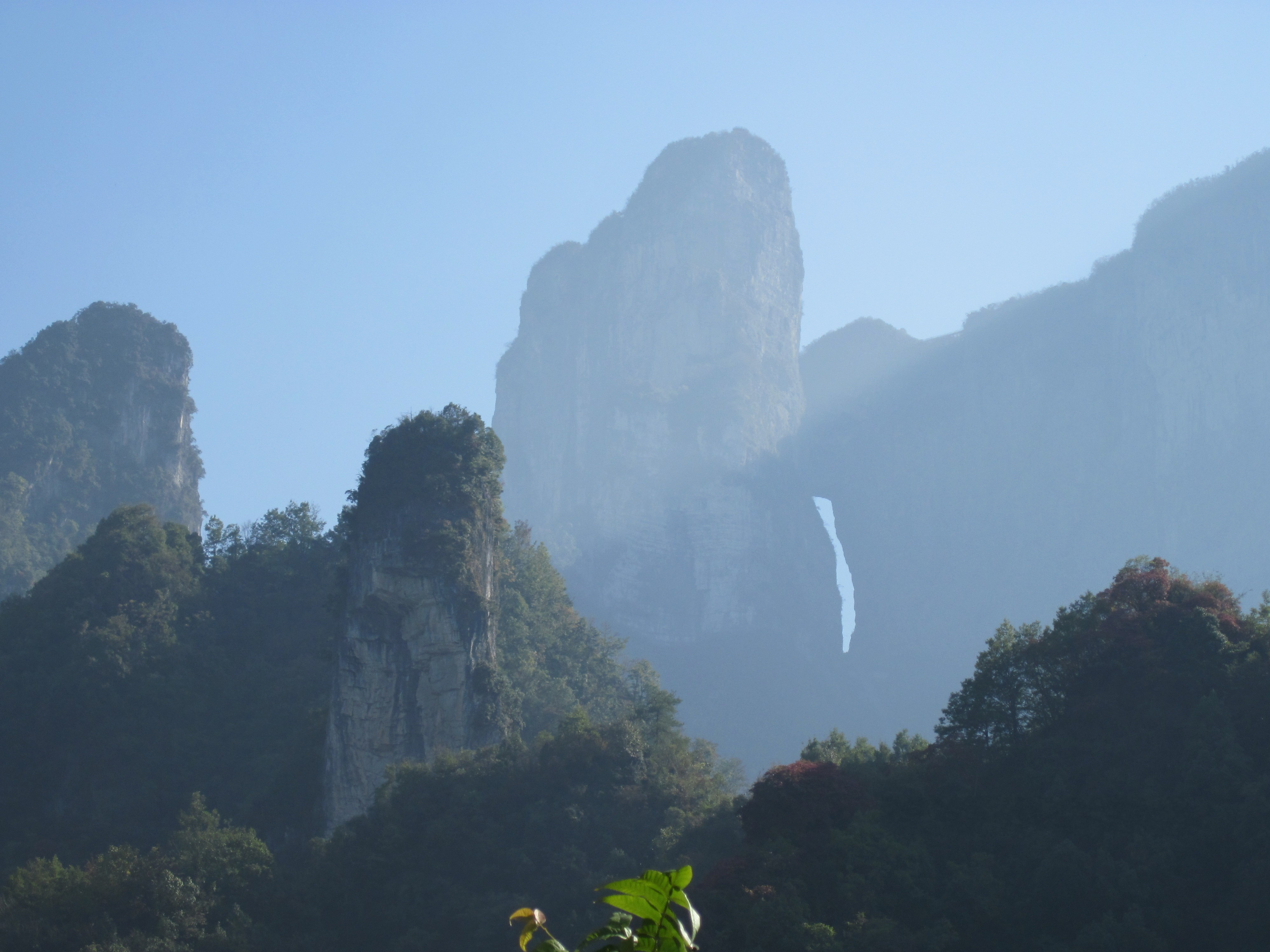
Tianmen Mountain.

Major mountains of Hunan are Wuling Mountains, Xuefeng Mountains, Nanling Mountains, Luoxiao Mountains and Heng Mountains.

The highest natural elevation in Hunan is 2,122.35-metre (6,963.1 ft) at Ling Peak (酃峰; Líng Fēng).

=== Wuling Mountains ===
Wuling Mountains is located in the northwestern Hunan, its highest peak is Mount Huping (壺瓶山), at an altitude of 2,098.7-metre (6,885 ft). It is the watershed between Lishui River and Yuan River.

=== Xuefeng Mountains ===
Xuefeng Mountains is located in the southwestern Hunan, its highest peak is Jiulongchi (九龍池; Nine Dragons Pond), at an altitude of 1,622-metre (5,322 ft). It is the watershed between Zi River and Yuan River.

=== Nanling Mountains ===
Nanling Mountains is situated in southern Hunan, Jiucailing (韭菜嶺; Ridge of Chinese Chive) is the highest peak with an altitude of 2,009-metre (6,591 ft).

=== Luoxiao Mountains ===
Luoxiao Mountains is situated in western Hunan, Mount Bamian (八面山) is the highest peak with an altitude of 2,042-metre (6,699 ft).

=== Heng Mountains ===
Heng Mountains is situated in central Hunan, Zhurong Peak (祝融峰) is the highest peak with an altitude of 1,290-metre (4,230 ft).

== Rivers ==
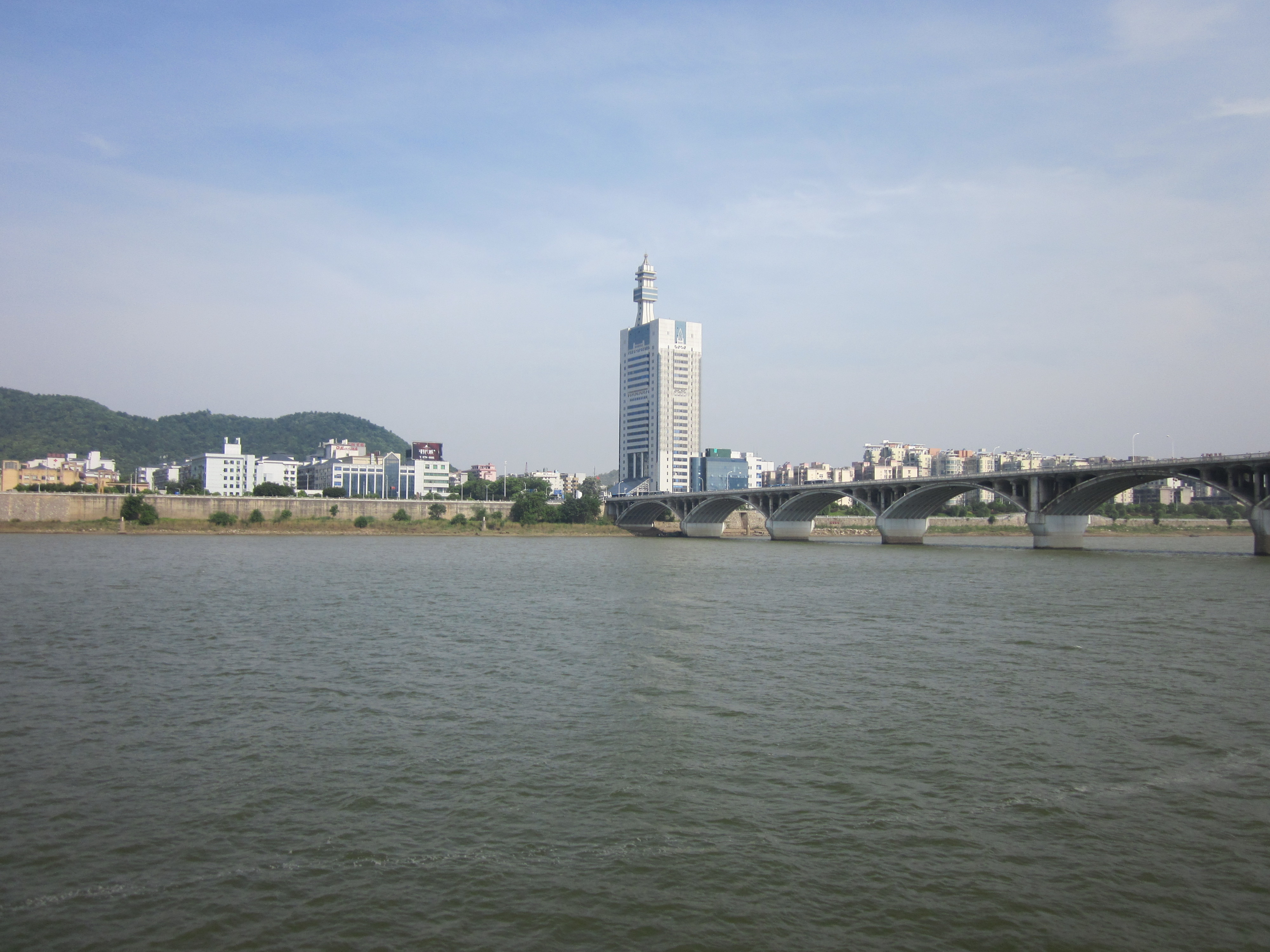
Xiangjiang River in Changsha.

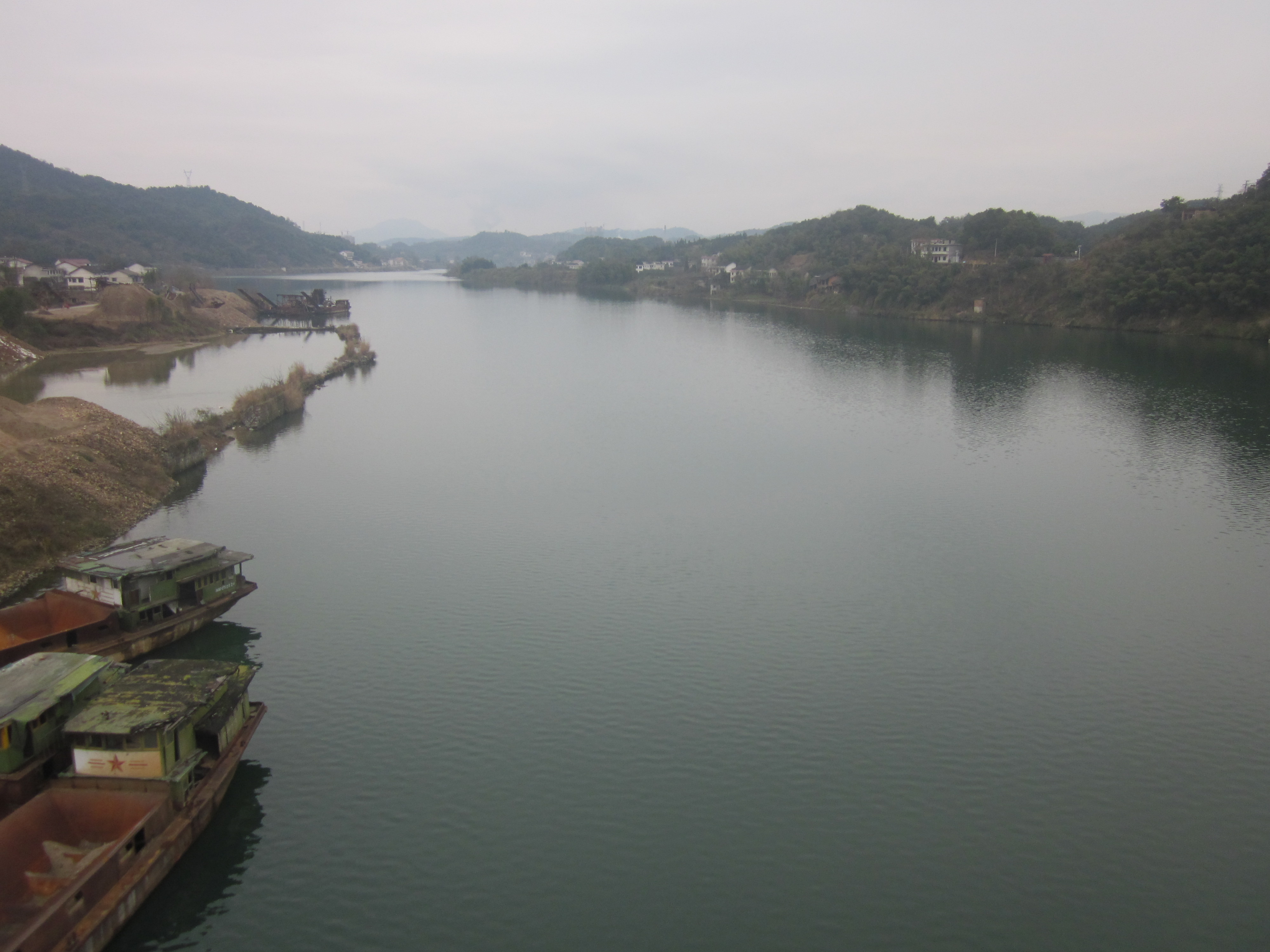
Zi River in Lengshuijiang.

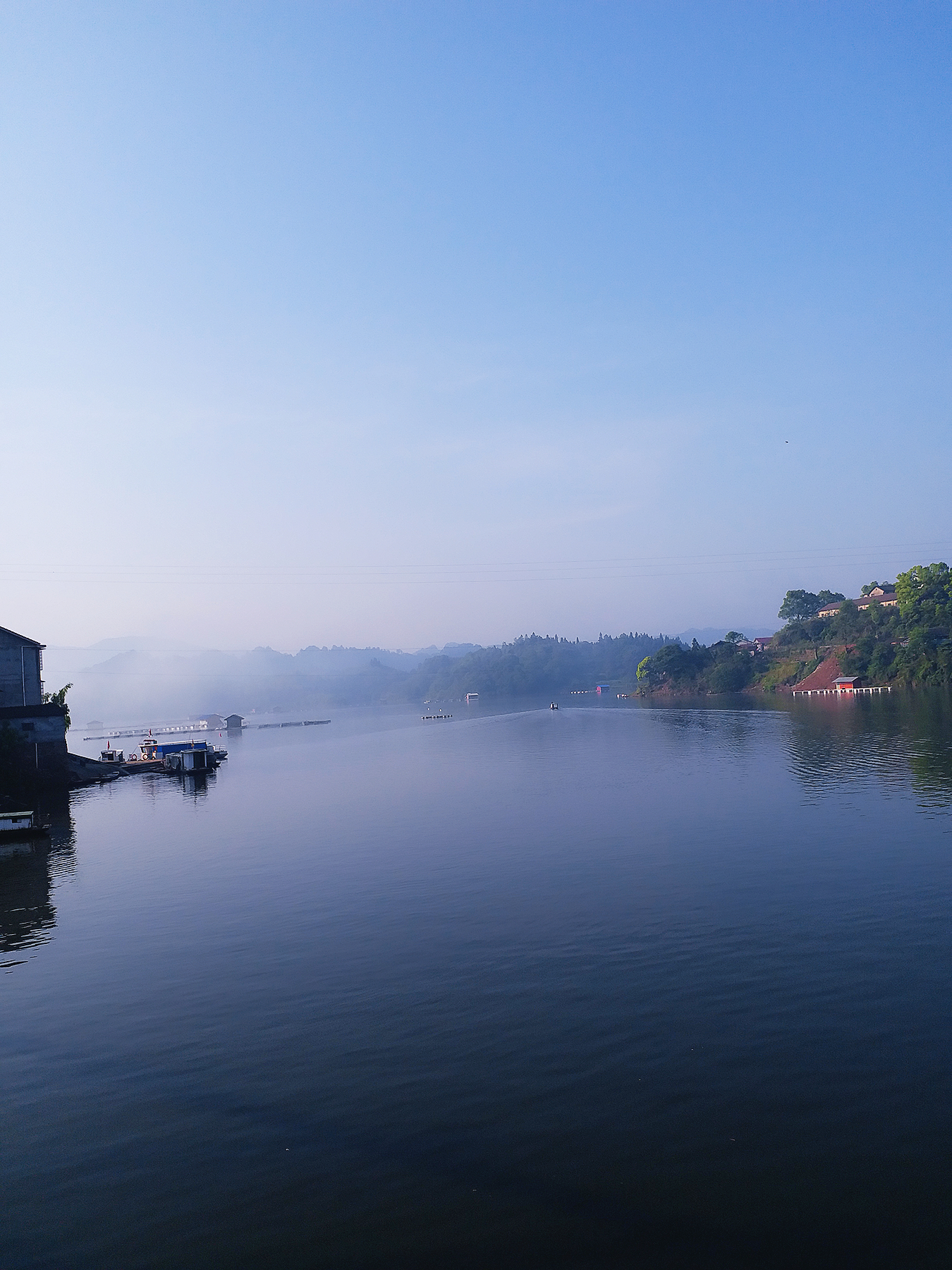
Yuan River in Yuanling County of Huaihua.

Major rivers of Hunan are the Xiang River, Zi River, Yuan River, and Lishui River.

=== Xiang River ===
Xiang River is the chief river of the Lake Dongting drainage system and the largest river in Hunan. It has several tributaries, such as Xiao River, Chongling River, Zheng River, Lei River, Mi River, Lushui River, Juan River, Lianshui River, Wei River, Liuyang River and Laodao River. It has a drainage basin of 85,383-square-kilometre (32,967 sq mi) in Hunan.

=== Zi River ===
Zi River has two headwaters, the Fuyi River (夫夷水) and the Hao River (郝水). It is 630 kilometres (390 mi) long and drains an area of 26,738 square kilometres (10,324 sq mi) in Hunan. The river rises in Xinning County and flows generally north through Wugang, Longhui County, Shaoyang, Lengshuijiang and then northwest past the counties and cities of Anhua County, Taojiang County, and Yiyang, where it flows into the Wanzi Lake.

=== Yuan River ===
Yuan River is the longest river in Hunan, begins in southeastern Guizhou, is 568 kilometres (353 mi) and has a drainage basin of 51,066 square kilometres (19,717 sq mi) in Hunan. It has two headwaters, the Longtou River (龍頭江) and the An River (安江). It flows northeastwards through Suining, Huitong County, Huaihua, Xupu County, Chenxi County, Luxi County, Yuanling, Changde to join the Dalian Lake in Dingcheng District of Changde.

=== Lishui River ===
Lishui River rises in Sangzhi County in northwestern Hunan, and flows generally northeast, passing through Zhangjiajie, Cili County, Shimen County, Li County and joining the Wanzi Lake in Yuanjiang.

== Lakes and reservoirs ==
Dongting Lake is the largest lake in Hunan and the 3rd largest lake and the 2nd largest freshwater lake in China covering a total of 2,740 square kilometres (1,060 sq mi). Other lakes include Wanzi Lake, Dalian Lake, Datong Lake, Dongjiang Lake.

Major reservoirs in Hunan are the Fengtan Reservoir, Huangshi Reservoir, Tuoxi Reservoir, Shuihumiao Reservoir, Shuangpai Reservoir, Ouyanghai Reservoir, Qingshanlong Reservoir, and Jiubujiang Reservoir.

== Climate ==
Hunan has a humid subtropical climate influenced by the East Asian Monsoon, with an average annual temperature of 18.2 °C (64.8 °F), total annual rainfall of 1,215-millimetre (47.8 in), a frost-free period of 253 to 311 days and annual average sunshine hours in 1521 hours. Summers are wet with high temperatures, high humidity and a high heat index. Winters are relatively dry and chilly with cold wind.

== Protected areas ==
Hunan has 23 National Forest Parks, 17 Provincial Forest Parks, 4 National Natural Reserves and 22 Provincial Natural Reserves. The Four National Natural Reserves are Dongting Lake, Mount Huping (壶瓶山), Mount Badagong (八大公山) and Mount Mang (莽山). Some of the most frequently visited parks include Mount Dawei (大围山), Tianmen Mountain, Taohuayuan (桃花源), Mount Yangming, Jiuyi Mountains, Mount Liang (崀山).

== Ecology ==
=== Fauna ===
There are 81 species of mammal, 379 species of birds, 75 reptiles and 42 amphibians in Hunan, including 90 species of national protected animals. There are 17 national first-level protected animals and 73 national second-level protected animals in Hunan. Among them the first rank has Baiji, South China tiger, Clouded leopard, Asian golden cat, Chinese sturgeon, Spot-billed pelican, White stork and Red-crowned crane and the second rank has Rhesus macaque, Stump-tailed macaque, Asian black bear, Pangolin, Finless porpoise, Whooper swan, Tundra swan, Masked palm civet, Mandarin duck, Eagle and Chinese giant salamander.

=== Flora ===
Hunan is known as the "hometown of tung tree" and "hometown of China fir". In Hunan, vast forests of China fir constitute the largest proportion of the province's forest growth. There is also an abundance of tea-oil tree, Pinus massoniana, Phyllostachys edulis, Populus, Cinnamomum camphora, Taxus chinensis, Vernicia fordii. There are 112 national first-level protected plants: Isoetes sinensis, Davidia involucrata, Cycad, Ginkgo, Cathaya, Metasequoia glyptostroboides, Scaly-sided merganser, Bretschneidera and Brasenia.

== Mineral resources ==
Hunan has been hailed as the "hometown of non-ferrous metal" and "hometown of nonmetallic minerals". There are more than 141 species of minerals in Hunan. Antimony of Hunan is ranked No. 1 in the world. Bismuth, rubidium, anthracite, realgar, fluorite, sepiolite, baryte are ranked No. 1 in China. Manganese, vanadium, rhenium, mirabilite, arsenic and kaolinite reached number 2 in China. Zinc, aluminium, tin, tantalum, graphite and diamond peaked at number 3 in China. Mount Xikuang of Xinhua County is honoured as the "Capital of Antimony in the World".
