= Yiyang (disambiguation) =

Yiyang (益阳市) is a prefecture-level city in Hunan, China

Yiyang may refer to the following locations in China:

== Counties ==
- Yiyang County, Henan (宜阳县), of Luoyang Prefecture, Henan
- Yiyang County, Jiangxi (弋阳县), of Shangrao Prefecture, Jiangxi

== Subdistricts ==
- Yiyang Subdistrict, a subdistrict and the seat of Changning City, Hunan
- Yiyang Subdistrict, Huangchuan (弋阳街道), a subdistrict of Huangchuan County, Henan

== Other ==
- Chinese frigate Yiyang (548), a Type 054A frigate
