= Mashui =

Mǎshuǐ (马水) may refer to:

- Mashui, Yangchun, town in Guangdong, China
- Mashui Township (马水镇), a town of Leiyang City, Hunan.
