= Shengqiao =

Shengqiao may refer to the following locations in China:

- Shengqiao, Lujiang County (盛桥镇), town in Anhui
- Shengqiao, Changning (胜桥镇), a town of Changning City, Hunan.
