= Zhangshu (disambiguation) =

Zhangshu is a county-level city in Jiangxi province, China.

Zhangshu may also refer to these places in Hunan province, China:

- Zhangshu Township, a township in Hengyang County
- Zhangshu, Yongxing County, a town in Yongxing County
- Zhangshu, Xiangyin County, a town in Xiangyin County

== See also ==
- Zhang Shu (1925–1998), Chinese diplomat
