= Yiyang Town =

Historic town in Hunan, China

Yiyang Town (Chinese: 宜阳镇; pinyin: Yíyáng Zhèn) is a historic town and the former county seat of Changning City in Hunan, China. The town was established in 1935 and it was divided into 3 subdistricts and ceased to be as a separate town in 2008. It had an area of 67.5 km^{2} (26.1 sq mi) with a population of 67,354 (as of 2000 census). It had 19 villages and 13 communities under its jurisdiction in 2007.

== History ==
The town of Yiyang was established in 1935. From 1949 to 1952, it was a part of the first district in Changning County, and Chengguan Town (城关镇) was established in 1953. The town of Chengguan was reorganized as Hongqi People's Commune (红旗人民公社) in 1958 and Chengguan Town was restored in 1961. In May 1995, the town of Chengguan was renamed to Yiyang. Villages of Dali (大立), Wanshou (万寿) and Jinqiao (金桥) from the former Tonghuang Township (桐黄乡), villages of Huxi (虎溪), Tangshan (塘山), Lianhua (莲花) and Huangzhi (黄枝) from Zhengtong Township (正峒乡), villages of Xialian (夏联) and Chajian (茶箭) from Qutan Township (曲潭乡) and villages of Qingshi (青市) and Qushi (曲市) from Yaotang Township (瑶塘乡), the 11 villages were placed under the jurisdiction of Yiyang Town. Its area expanded from 16.51 km^{2} (6.37 sq mi) to 67.5 km^{2} (26.1 sq mi).

In 1998, the town had 20 villages under its jurisdiction. In 2000, it was divided into 19 villages and 13 communities, 186 villager's groups and 68 residential groups; there were 25,172 households with a population of 71,758. As of 2000 census, it had a population of 67,354. The town of Yiyang was divided into 3 subdistricts of Peiyuan, Quanfeng and Yiyang in 2008.

== Subdivisions ==
Dividing the town of Yiyang into 3 subdistricts in 2007
divisions	Peiyuan Subdistrict (培元街道)		Quanfeng Subdistrict (泉峰街道)		Yiyang Subdistrict (宜阳街道)	
divisions	English	Chinese	English	Chinese	English	Chinese
villages	Dali	大立	Xialian	夏联	Wanshou	万寿
villages	Tangshan	塘山	Chajian	茶箭	Songtang	嵩塘
villages	Huxi	虎溪	Qingshi	青市	Songlian	嵩联
villages	Lianhua	莲花	Qushi	曲市	Shizhou	石洲
villages	Liangjiang	两江	Xueqiang	学墙	Donghu	东湖
villages	Huangzhi	黄枝	Lengshui	冷水		
villages	Jinqiao	金桥	Nanshi	南市		
communities	Chengxi	城西	Chengnan	城南	Chengdong	城东
communities	Xishang	西上	Quanfeng	泉峰	Chengbei	城北
communities	Taojiang	桃江	Laodonglu	劳动路	Qunying	群英
communities			Shenglilu	胜利路	Qingyi	青宜
communities			Yidong	宜东		
communities			Songyi	嵩宜		
