= Bai River (Hunan) =

River in Hunan, China

Coordinates: 26°26′07″N 111°59′15″E

The Bai River (Chinese: 白水), also known as Baisui River (Chinese: 白水河), is a right-bank tributary of the middle Xiang River and one of main tributaries of the Xiang in Hunan Province. It rises in Baishui Township (Chinese: 白水瑶族乡) of Guiyang County, Hunan. Its main stream runs generally southeast to northwest through Guiyang, Changning and Qiyang counties, and it joins the Xiang in Guanzikou (Chinese: 罐子口) of Baishui Town (Chinese: 白水镇) of Qiyang. The Bai River has a length of 117 kilometres (73 mi), with its tributaries, and has a drainage-basin area of 1,810 square kilometres (700 sq mi).
