= Yishui River =

Right-bank tributary of the middle Xiang River in Hunan, China

Coordinates: 26°32′42″N 112°22′56″E

The Yishui River (Chinese: 宜水河), also known as Yi River (Chinese: 宜水), is a right-bank tributary of the middle Xiang River in Hunan, China. It is the largest and longest river in Changning City. The Yi River rises in Xiaoyangquan (Chinese: 小洋泉) of Baishui Township (Chinese: 白水乡) of Guiyang County. Its main stream runs generally south to north and joins the Xiang at Jiangkoutang (Chinese: 江口塘) of Xinhe Town (Chinese: 新河镇). The Yi River has a length of 86 kilometres (53 mi), with its tributaries, and its drainage basin covers an area of 1,056 square kilometres (408 sq mi).
