= Yi River =

Yi River may refer to:

- Yí River, river in Uruguay, tributary of Río Negro
- Yishui River (宜水 or 宜水河), a right-bank tributary of the middle Xiang River
- Yi River (Henan) (伊河), China
- Yi River (Hebei) (易水), China, flowing through Yi County, Hebei
- Yi River (Shandong) (沂河), China, flowing through Linyi
