= Heye =

Heye may refer to:

== People ==
- Libertas Haas-Heye
- George Gustav Heye (1874-1954), American-German collector of Native American arts
  - The George Gustav Heye Center
- Hellmuth Heye (1895-1970), German admiral
- Uwe-Karsten Heye (1940-2026), German journalist

== Places ==
- Heye, Shuangfeng County, a rural town in Shuangfeng County, Hunan, China
- Heye, Guiyang County, a rural town in Guiyang County, Hunan, China
