= List of mass stabbing incidents (2020–present) =

This is a list of mass stabbings that took place in the 2020s.

== 2020 ==
=== Midland, Texas, U.S. ===
On 14 March 2020, a Hispanic American man, 18, attacked an Asian family at a Sam's Club in Midland. After grabbing a knife from a store display, the attacker punched the father and cut him before attacking two of his sons, aged two and six. A Sam's Club employee and a U.S. Customs and Border Protection officer held the attacker down, with the store employee being stabbed in the process. The attacker yelled for the family to "get out of America" during the attack and later told police he attacked them because he believed they were Chinese and responsible for the COVID-19 pandemic, though the family was actually Burmese. The attacker pleaded guilty to federal hate crime charges and was sentenced to a total of 45 years in prison.

=== South Hedland, Australia ===
On 1 May, a fly-in fly-out worker from Perth attacked seven people in a shopping centre. None died but five were hospitalised. Police shot the attacker dead.

=== Vrútsky, Slovakia ===
On 11 June, one person was killed and five others were injured in a mass stabbing at a school. The perpetrator was shot dead.

=== Sarpsborg, Norway ===
On 15 July, a woman was killed and two more were injured in a series of stabbings. The perpetrator was arrested.

=== Zielona Góra, Poland ===
On 29 September 2020, 3 people were attacked with knives in a school by a student aged 17.

=== Krivoy Rog, Dnepropetrovsk Oblast, Ukraine ===
On 7 November 2020, 29-year-old man Taras Usenko armed with a kitchen knife stabbed ten people in Metalurhiinyi District of Krivoy Rog city, killing two (son and father), before being apprehended. He was sent to compulsory psychiatric treatment in February 2021.

=== Kaiyuan, China ===
On 27 December 2020, a man stabbed fourteen people in Kaiyuan, Liaoning, China, killing seven.

== 2021 ==
=== Mwenda, Democratic Republic of the Congo ===
On 4 January, 22 people were killed in a mass stabbing committed by the Allied Democratic Forces.

=== Beni, Democratic Republic of the Congo ===
On 15 March, 15 civilians were killed in a stabbing attack. The ADF was suspected to have been behind the attack.

=== Potsdam, Germany ===
On 28 April, 4 people were killed and another one was injured in an attack at a hospital, the perpetrator, identified as a female hospital's employee, was arrested. The victims were all patients.

=== Townsend, Delaware ===
On December 3, 40-year-old Donald Grier, would go on a stabbing spree, killing his stepmother, his sister, and his nephew, and mortally wounded his father. His father would later die in the hospital. Grier would attempt to flee in a vehicle and would crash into other cars before being apprehended. He pleaded guilty, but mentally ill, and was sentenced to life imprisonment without the possibility of parole.

== 2022 ==
=== Albuquerque, New Mexico ===
On 13 February, a man rode a bicycle through the city stabbing 11 people. He was later caught and taken into custody.

=== Aachen, Germany ===
On 13 May, a 31-year-old Iraqi national stabbed and injured four people on a train while stopped at Herzogenrath station. A police officer and other passengers subdued the attacker. The same month, after two days of trial, he was placed in a psychiatric hospital after he was found to be mentally ill.

=== Buskerud, Norway ===
On 20 May, three people were injured one critically in attacks in Uvdal and Nore. Police said it was due to a domestic dispute, The perpetrator was a Syrian migrant.

=== Kressbronn, Germany ===
On 28 June, 1 person was killed and 5 other were injured in an attack at a shelter for asylum-seekers.

=== Shanghai, China ===
On 9 July, 4 people were wounded in a stabbing in a hospital. Police opened fire and subdued the suspect.

=== Ludwigshafen, Germany ===
On 18 October, two people were killed and another was injured after a stabbing attack. The perpetrator, a Somali national, was found to have acted out of jealousy due to a recent break-up.

=== Assago, Italy ===
On 27 October, 1 person was killed and 5 others including Spanish footballer Pablo Mari were injured in a mass stabbing in a carrefour supermarket. The perpetrator, a man with mental health problems, who used a knife from a shelf was arrested at the scene.

=== Reykjavik, Iceland ===
On 17 November, a mass stabbing at the Bankastræti Club occurred, believed to be the result of an ongoing feud and involving multiple suspects. It led to the highest number of arrests in a single manhunt in Iceland's history. A policeman was fired when reported to have leaked videos of the stabbing.

== 2023 ==
=== Paris, France ===
On 11 January, 6 people were injured in a mass stabbing in the Gare du Nord train station. The attacker was shot, arrested, and hospitalised.

=== Duisburg, Germany ===
On 18 April, four people were injured in an attack at a John Reed gym. The attacker, a 27-year-old Syrian national, was found to have previously killed a man on 9 April and admitted to having Islamist motives. He was sentenced to life imprisonment in December 2023.

=== Tomisławice, Poland ===
On 10 May, a 19-year-old man killed a 16-year-old girl and injured 9 other people at an orphanage.

=== Milwaukee, Wisconsin, U.S. ===
On 14 May, four women were injured after being stabbed during a fight at an apartment building on Milwaukee's northside. Two women and a teenage girl were later apprehended. Afterwards, ten knives were reportedly recovered from the scene.

=== Eskilstuna, Sweden ===
On 1 June, four people were injured in an attack at a school.

=== Seoul, South Korea ===
On 21 July, 1 person was killed and 3 other were injured in a stabbing attack near subway station. The attacker was apprehended.

=== Santiago, Chile ===
Between 31 August and 1 September 2023, Begoña Lauga Blanco, an engineer in Las Condes, stabbed her three children (one of whom had Down syndrome) to death with a knife. She slit her own throat after alerting her husband via WhatsApp about the murders. When her husband arrived, Lauga was alive but injured. By the time paramedics arrived on scene, she had bled out to death. It was later revealed she had clinical depression and her husband had just started divorce proceedings.

=== Canberra, Australia ===
On 18 September, 3 people were injured in a mass stabbing at the Australian national university, the attacker was detained.

=== Milwaukee, Wisconsin, U.S. ===
On the evening 23 October 15-year-old Erik Mendoza stabbed three people within minutes of each other on Milwaukee's northside at random.

- The first stabbing occurred around 6:50 p.m. when an 18-year-old man was stabbed in the back near the intersection of 42nd and North Avenue.
- At around 7:07 p.m., a 14-year-old boy was stabbed in the shoulder while walking near the intersection of 35th and Center Street.
- The last stabbing occurred around 7:15 p.m, at the intersection of Sherman Boulevard and Center Street, when a 38-year-old year old woman was stabbed in the back of the neck as she waited at a bus stop.

Two days later, on 26 October, Mendoza, along with 27-year-old David Pietura, allegedly killed 5-year-old Prince McCree in the basement house they shared with McCree. In July 2024, Pietura was sentenced to life in prison without parole for his role in McCree's death. Mendoza currently awaits trial.

=== Los Angeles, California, U.S. ===
- Van Nuys High School stabbing

=== Ruston, Louisiana, U.S. ===
A senior student at Louisiana Tech University was charged with stabbing four women on campus on 13 November 2023, killing one. According to police, the suspect first threatened a student playing basketball inside the Lambright Sports and Wellness Center before chasing him outside. The man then stabbed two women leaving an exercise class, killing one. The man then attacked another woman who taught a class at the center, as well as a woman to attempted to intervene.

=== New York City, New York, U.S. ===
On 3 December, a man stabbed and killed 4 of his family member and injured another one before he went on to attack 2 police officers before he was shot dead.

== 2024 ==
=== Melbourne and St. Kilda, Australia ===
On 6 and 7 January, a man stabbed five people at multiple locations in the late evening and early morning hours.

=== Wuppertal, Germany ===
On 22 February, a student stabbed 5 people in a school before attempting suicide and getting arrested.

=== Vienna, Austria ===
On 23 February, 3 women were stabbed to death in a brothel. A 27 year old suspect was arrested.

=== Cullinan, South Africa ===
On 12 March, 3 Coptic Christian monks from Egypt were stabbed to death in an orthodox church. A 4th person was reportedly hit with an iron rod.

=== Río Bueno, Chile ===
On 25 March, Francisco Uribe Obando stabbed a pregnant woman, her husband of 12 years, and their 10-year-old daughter to death. The suspect has since been diagnosed with bipolar disorder and schizophrenia and is awaiting trial.

=== Zhenxiong, China ===
On 7 May, a 40-year-old man stabbed two people to death and injured 21 others in a knife attack before being arrested. He had been imprisoned before due to injuring others over a motorcycle dispute in 2013.

=== Zofingen, Switzerland ===
On 15 May, a stabbing attack occurred in a railway station in the northern Swiss town of Zofingen leaving 6 injured. The perpetrator was arrested afterwards.

=== Bishkek, Kyrgyzstan ===
On 16 May, 4 people were injured with a knife at a tennis club.

=== Norilsk, Russia ===
On 18 May, a 34-year-old man killed a 36-year-old woman in her apartment, injured her 12-year-old son, then exited and injured a man and a woman he did not know and was apprehended.

=== Massachusetts and Connecticut, U.S. ===
On 25 May 2024, a 26-year-old Martha's Vineyard man allegedly stabbed four girls at the AMC Braintree 10 movie theater in Braintree, Massachusetts. Hours later, the same man allegedly stabbed two McDonald's employees at a restaurant in Quincy. He was arrested in Sandwich later that day and was charged in connection with those stabbings, as well as the stabbing death of a man in Deep River, Connecticut, believed to have been committed before the movie theater stabbing.

=== Jilin City, China ===
On 10 June 2024, four Americans from Cornell College, Iowa were stabbed while visiting a temple in Beishan Park, along with one Chinese national.

=== Charlotte, North Carolina, U.S. ===
On 12 and 13 June 2024, a 19-year-old man stabbed three people in different neighborhoods throughout Charlotte.

=== Indianapolis, Indiana, U.S. ===
On 17 June 2024, a 27-year-old man stabbed and injured nine people during a confrontation between two groups outside of a restaurant on Indianapolis's northwest side. The man was later arrested.

=== Huntington Beach, California, U.S. ===
On 4 July 2024, two people were killed and three others were injured when a man exited a vehicle and began stabbing people celebrating Independence Day on a residential street.

=== Tagaytay, Philippines ===
On 10 July, 3 people were stabbed to death in a hotel including 2 Australian tourists.

=== Holon, Israel ===
On 4 August 2024, a mass stabbing targeting civilians occurred at three nearby locations in Holon. The attack resulted in the deaths of two elderly individuals—a 66-year-old woman and an 80-year-old man—while two others were injured. The attacker, a 35-year-old Palestinian man from Salfit, West Bank(Samaria), was shot and killed at the scene by a police officer. Palestinian terrorist organization Hamas later issued a statement mourning the perpetrator, describing him as a "martyred hero."

=== New York City, New York, U.S. ===
Shortly before midnight on 4 August 2024, a man stabbed and injured five men outside of a bar in Queens during a fight. Afterwards, the attacker fled the scene.

=== Eskişehir, Turkey ===
On 12 August 2024, a mass stabbing occurred outside of a mosque in Eskisehir. The attacker, identified as 18-year-old Arda Küçükyetim, stabbed and wounded five people before being arrested. He was caught with an axe, a bulletproof vest and helmet, all adorned with neo-Nazi symbology.

=== Mosfellsbær, Iceland ===
On 24 August, three people were stabbed at a nightclub. On 30 August, one of the victims, a 17-year-old girl, died from her injuries. A 16-year-old boy was arrested.

=== Engadine, Australia ===
On 25 August, 4 people were injured in a stabbing attack in a car after a domestic incident. The perpetrator was later taken into custody with self-inflicted wounds.

=== Eiserfeld, Germany ===
On 30 August, at around 7:40 p.m., a 32-year-old woman armed with a knife stabbed and wounded five people on a bus on Freiengründer Strasse on its way to a music festival. The suspect was detained and did not resist arrest.

=== Azambuja, Portugal ===
Around lunchtime on 17 September 2024, a 12-year-old boy armed with a knife, and wearing a bulletproof vest, stabbed six classmates at a school in Azambuja, near Lisbon. Shortly after, the police arrested the attacker. Police later found evidence that the 12-year-old attacker was being influenced by Nazi ideology.

=== Châteauguay, Quebec, Canada ===
Three people were stabbed and injured when a man armed with a knife entered a mosque on 20 September in Châteauguay, Montreal, Quebec, Canada.

=== New York City, New York, U.S. ===
Six people were stabbed and injured in the early hours of 22 September in the Gerritsen Beach in Brooklyn.

=== Zurich, Switzerland ===
On 1 October, three children were injured—one of them seriously—in a knife attack at a daycare center in the Swiss city of Zurich. A spokesperson for the city's police force stated that a 23-year-old Chinese man attacked a group of children who were being led to the center by a staff member.

=== Ontario, Canada ===
Between 1 and 3 October, three people were fatally stabbed in Toronto, Hamilton, and Niagara Falls.

=== Redding, California, U.S. ===
A woman was killed and three other men were injured when a 31-year-old local man at a hotel suddenly attacked without provocation during a meeting on 8 October in Downtown Redding. The suspect was later arrested.

=== Hadera, Israel ===
On 9 October, a man stabbed 6 people with an axe killing 1 and injuring the other one before he got shot dead by police.

=== Cincinnati, Ohio ===
On 24 October, a 66-year-old man stabbed 3 people to death before stabbing himself at College Hill in Cincinnati, Ohio. He was arrested and later died from his wounds.

=== Montréal, Canada ===
On 25 October, 4 people were injured after 2 teenagers went amok in a school. They were both arrested.

=== Saint-Petersburg, Russia ===
On 25 October, at about 11:40, a man, armed with two knives being in a state of psychosis, attacked people in a supermarket "O'Key". He wounded five people before being apprehended by customers and staff, and was subsequently hospitalized. Before the attack, he shouted "I hate people!". In May 2025 he was sent to compulsory psychiatric treatment.

=== Kagadi, Uganda ===
On 30 October, an unknown cult stabbed multiple people, leaving 8 dead and 8 more injured. 2 of the attackers were shot dead by police.

=== Seattle, Washington, U.S. ===
A series of stabbings in the span of two days left ten people injured on 7 and 8 November.

- The first incident occurred on 7 November across the Chinatown-International District, when a 52-year-old woman was found with multiple stab wounds early morning.
- Later that same day, a 32-year-old man was found with multiple stab wounds during afternoon. At around 8 p.m., a 37-year-old man was stabbed multiple times in the back. A 60-year-old man was then stabbed at 8:39 p.m.
- On 8 November, a 53-year-old man was stabbed in the neck at around 1 a.m.
- At around 2 p.m., five people were found stabbed in four different locations. Four men were in critical condition, while a fifth male was treated at the scene. The suspect, identified as a 34-year-old man from Las Vegas, Nevada, was later arrested.

=== New York City, New York, U.S. ===
On 18 November, a 51-year-old man stabbed three people within hours of each other in Manhattan at random.

- The first incident occurred around 8:30 a.m. in Chelsea, when 36-year-old Angel Lata Landi, a construction worker, was stabbed in the abdomen. Landi was later taken to Bellevue Hospital where he was pronounced dead.
- At 10:25 a.m., a 67-year-old man was stabbed in Kips Bayneighborhood as he fished along the East River near FDR drive. He was also taken to Bellevue Hospital where he was where he was pronounced dead.
- The last stabbing occurred around 10:55 a.m, when 36-year-old Augustin Wilma was stabbed multiple times in the chest and left arm in the Murray Hill neighborhood near the United Nations Headquarters. Wilma was taken to the New York Presbyterian/Weill Cornell Medical Center, where she later succumbed to her injuries later in the day.

After the stabbing of Wilma, the suspect was arrested near East 46th Street and 1st Avenue. The man was identified as Roman Rivera, a homeless man.

=== Verucchio, Italy ===
On 31 December, a 23-year-old man of Egyptian Islamic origin stabbed and injured five people in new year celebrations before getting shot dead by a soldier.

== 2025 ==
=== Lucknow, India ===
On 1 January, a 24-year-old man was arrested after he stabbed and killed his mother and four sisters in an honour killing.

=== Puente Alto, Chile ===
On 10 January, a 26-year-old man (who had previously been arrested for home abuse and received a restraining order against entering the household of his would-be victims) stabbed his own mother and his 6-year-old nephew to death, along with attacking another member of the household, a 39-year-old woman who managed to escape and call police. The man then fled on foot, injuring two more people, including a policewoman. As he stabbed her in the neck, responding officers shot him dead.

=== Denver, Colorado, U.S. ===
On 11 and 12 January, four people were stabbed on the vicinity of the 16th Street Mall. A 24-year-old was arrested in connection of the stabbings.

=== Mahaicony, Guyana ===
On 15 January, a drug addict killed two people and injured another in Mahaicony, Guyana. The perpetrator was shot and killed by police.

=== Miami, Florida ===
On 16 January, two homeless people were killed and two others were injured in an attack. The 30-year-old suspect was arrested.

=== Tel Aviv, Israel ===
On 21 January, four people were injured in a terrorist attack. The perpetrator, a Moroccan-US Muslim national, was killed by an armed civilian.

=== Nagano, Japan ===
On 22 January, one person was killed while two others were injured in a stabbing attack near Nagano Station. A suspect was arrested on 26 January.

=== Haifa, Israel ===
On 3 March, a seventy-year-old man was killed and three other people were injured in a possible terrorist attack at a bus stop. The perpetrator was killed.

=== Atwater, California, U.S. ===
On 19 March, four people were injured in an attack with a sickle. A 38-year-old stabbed three people at a bus station before stabbing and carjacking a person. He was later arrested after crashing during a police chase.

=== Trondheim, Norway ===
On 29 March, four people were injured in a stabbing attack in the Norwegian city. The perpetrator was arrested and was also reported to be among the injured.

=== Washington, D.C, U.S. ===
On 3 April, a man stabbed himself multiple times before stabbing and injuring six bystanders in a stabbing near Gallaudet University in Trinidad, Washington, D.C.. A suspect that was under the influence of drugs was arrested.

=== New York City, New York, U.S. ===
On 6 April, four children were stabbed and injured with a meat cleaver inside of a house in Bensonhurst, Brooklyn, New York, United States. The perpetrator was shot and critically injured by responding officers.

=== Perry, Georgia, U.S. ===
Also on 6 April, a person stabbed three adults and a child to death at home. A suspect who authorities believed knew the family was arrested.

=== Los Angeles, California, U.S. ===
On 12 April, five people, three critically, were stabbed in the Reseda neighborhood of Northwest Los Angeles.

=== Kolkata, India ===
On 17 April, a group of knife wielding people stabbed and injured three people near Park Circus.

=== Antipolo, Philippines ===
On 22 April, a man entered a bakery and fatally stabbed seven employees while they were sleeping. A suspect was arrested but the motive is unknown.

=== Cheongju, South Korea ===
On 28 April, a student with an intellectual disability stabbed six people, three of which were staff members who suffered serious injuries including the principal, with a knife at a high school in North Chungcheong Province before jumping from a reservoir and later being rescued.

=== Tianjin, China ===
Also on 28 April, a 47-year-old man attacked six medical staff with a knife in the orthopedic department of Tianjin Hospital, killing two people and injuring four others.

=== Hamilton, Ontario, Canada ===
On 2 May, three people were stabbed at a mosque by two suspects during an altercation in downtown Hamilton, Ontario. One person was taken to hospital, one person was treated at the scene and another showed up at a hospital.

=== Big Stone Gap, Virginia, U.S. ===
Also on 2 May, five police officers required medical treatment after a stabbing attack by six inmates, including five MS-13 members, at the Wallens Ridge State Prison in Big Stone Gap.

=== Chicago, Illinois, U.S. ===
On 2 May, seven people were injured in a stabbing attack and fight on a lawn.

=== Warsaw, Poland ===
On 7 May, a woman was decapitated and a security guard was critically injured in an axe attack at an auditorium on the campus of University of Warsaw. A 22-year-old Polish man reported to be a third-year law student was arrested by police. His motive is unknown but police are investigating the attack.

=== Santa Ana, California, U.S. ===
Also on 7 May, one student was killed and two others were injured in a stabbing attack outside the entrance of Santa Ana High School in Orange County. The suspects, described by police as Hispanic males, fled the scene but were later arrested.

=== Riverside, California, U.S. ===
On 12 May, five people were stabbed and injured, including one critically, at a sober living facility in Riverside. The suspect was a resident at the facility that stabbed his roommates and barricaded himself before surrendering to officers. The suspect also suffered injuries.

=== Halle, Germany ===
Also on 18 May, three people were stabbed during an altercation in front of a private residence.

=== Pirkkala, Finland ===
On 20 May, A 16-year-old student went on a stabbing attack in a school targeting women resulting in three people getting injured.

=== Fukuyama, Japan ===
On 21 May, three people were stabbed and injured at a high school.

=== Melbourne, Australia ===
On 25 May, four people were injured in a machete attack and fight at the Northland Shopping Centre.

=== Baykalsk, Russia ===
On 28 May, a drunk youth stabbed partygoers, killing 4 people and injuring 4 others. The perpetrator subsequently died in a fire.

=== Bairnsdale, Australia ===
On 29 May, a 24-year-old woman stabbed four men, including an employee at a Woolworths supermarket.

=== Salem, Oregon ===
On 1 June, eleven people were stabbed and injured at a homeless shelter in Salem.

=== Winnipeg, Manitoba, Canada ===
On 2 June, five people were stabbed and injured, including three hospitalized with critical injuries, in an isolated incident during a fight between a group of people in the North End of Winnipeg.

=== Hubei, China ===
On 4 June, three students were injured in a stabbing at Wuhan University in Wuhan. A 23-year-old male student identified as Zhu was arrested at the scene. The perpetrator committed the attack due to academic difficulties. The attack is under investigation.

=== Macon, Georgia, U.S. ===
On 5 June, one inmate, 22-year-old Breele Jahiem Johnson, was stabbed and killed while four other inmates ranging from 19 to 40-years-old were injured during an altercation inside the Bibb County Law Enforcement Center jail in Macon, Georgia.

=== Paris, France ===
On 23 June 145 people were pricked with syringes by strangers, many of them at a music festival in Paris, after calls for the act were placed on the internet. Police detained 12 people in connection with the attacks. Authorities are unsure if substances were used in the syringes, but many of the victims said they felt ill afterward.

=== Mellrichstadt, Germany ===
On 1 July, a stabbing attack at the Ueberlandwerke Rhön electric utility company in Mellrichstadt, Bavaria, Germany, left one woman dead and two men seriously injured. The 59-year-old female victim died from multiple stab wounds, while the two male victims, aged 55 and 62, sustained serious injuries. A 21-year-old German man was arrested at the scene. Authorities confirmed there is no ongoing danger to the public and found no evidence of political or terrorist motives. Investigations into the motive are ongoing.

=== Tampere, Finland ===
On 3 July, four people were stabbed near the Ratina shopping centre in Tampere, southern Finland, on Thursday afternoon. The victims, all adults, sustained non-life-threatening injuries and were given first aid at the scene before being hospitalized. Police quickly detained a Finnish man in his twenties as the suspect. Authorities have ruled out any terrorist or racist motives at this stage and are investigating the case as four counts of attempted manslaughter. The shopping centre was temporarily locked down, and the area was cordoned off before being reopened once the situation was secured.

=== Estação, Brazil ===
On 8 July, a 9-year-old was killed and a teacher and another child were injured when a 16-year-old attacked people with a knife at a school in the Estação municipality of Rio Grande do Sul, Brazil. A suspect was arrested shortly after. The suspect had no criminal record and police did not release his identity or other details. The police said a motive was not immediately clear and an investigation was underway. Estação's town hall said that following the attack classes had been suspended across the area for an undetermined period.

=== Calgary, Alberta, Canada ===
On 9 July, three people were stabbed shortly after 11:00 p.m. in a targeted attack at the Euroslide, one of the rides on the Calgary Stampede Midway in Calgary.

=== Leiyang, China ===
On 3 August, two people are killed and three others are injured in a mass stabbing attack at a primary school in Caizichi, Hunan.

=== Washington, D.C., United States ===
On 16 August, three men were stabbed on H Street. A suspect was arrested and all victims are expected to survive.

=== Quebec, Canada ===
Also on 16 August, three men were stabbed and injured at a park, including two critically, in Saint-Laurent, Montreal. A day later, a 22-year-old man succumbed to his injuries in hospital. No arrests have been made and an investigation is underway.

=== Anhui, China ===
On 28 August, two people were killed and another was injured in a stabbing attack at a market stall in Yingzhou County, Fuyang. The perpetrator, an elderly man, was reportedly being harassed by the stall owner.

=== Marseille, France ===
On 2 September, five people were stabbed and injured, including one critically and two seriously, at a hotel and a street. The Tunisian perpetrator was fatally shot by police after ignoring police warnings to drop his weapons in front of a kebab restaurant near the Old Port of Marseille. The man, armed with two knives and a baton, attacked someone in his old room after being evicted from the hotel for unpaid rent before stabbing the hotel manager and his son and attempting to stab a manager in the snack bar before being chased outside by customers and stabbing two others on a nearby street. He was a legal resident but was known to police.

=== Seoul, South Korea ===
On 3 September, two men and a woman were fatally stabbed at a pizza restaurant in Gwanak District. All victims were pronounced dead upon being transported to hospital. The perpetrator, a man in his 40s, was the owner of the restaurant and got into a dispute with contractors. He attempted to commit suicide but was stopped, injuring himself in the process.

=== Jincheng, Shanxi, China ===
On 4 September, a stabbing at a pork shop in Xishangzhuang, a village in Cheng District of Jincheng City, led to three deaths. The perpetrator, identified as the owner, killed a man during a dispute before killing another customer who attempted to flee upon seeing the murder, and a woman waiting for the man outside.

=== Pittsburgh, Pennsylvania, U.S. ===
On 24 September, three students were stabbed and wounded at Carrick High School, during a fight taking place. A 16-year-old was arrested, charged with assault, and is currently being denied bail and awaiting trial.

=== Arjona, Venezuela ===
On 9 October, a student stabbed and injured three people at Colegio Virgen del Valle: A cafeteria worker, her daughter, and a teacher. He was allegedly motivated by an "online challenge".

=== Torrance, California, U.S. ===
On 13 October, three teachers were stabbed in a meeting room at Switzer Learning Center, a school for neurodivergent children; they all received non-life-threatening wounds; the suspect, a 17-year-old ex-student of the school, left an inert explosive device nearby; he was later arrested on attempted murder and explosive charges.

=== San Francisco, California, U.S. ===
On 26 October, five people were injured and stabbed at a business in the Inner Richmond, San Francisco, California. No injuries were life -threatening. The business' identity was not disclosed, but an address search shows it happened at either a Burger King restaurant or at an Irish pub. As of 3 November, no suspects have been identified.

=== Småland, Sweden ===
On 14 November, three men were stabbed and injured in Kalmar. Not much is known.

=== Gush Etzion, West Bank ===
On 18 November, two 18-year-old Muslim Palestinian men rammed a vehicle into people at the Gush Etzion Junction before getting out and stabbing people. A man was killed and two others injured before IDF soldiers shot and killed the attackers, also injuring an Israeli woman by accident.

== 2026 ==
=== Antwerp, Belgium ===
On 22 January, six people were injured in a mass stabbing during a Kurdish demonstration in Antwerp, Flanders, Belgium. A group of male assailants indiscriminately attacked the protesters. On site police arrested four suspects and administered first aid before ambulances arrived.

=== Osaka, Japan ===
On 14 February, three teenagers were stabbed in an attack, one of them fatally. Police arrested a 21-year-old man in connection to the attack.

=== Key Peninsula, Washington, U.S. ===
On 24 February, four people were stabbed to death by a 32-year-old man in the Key Peninsula, Washington state. The suspect was fatally shot by a responding deputy.

=== Fairfax County, Virginia, U.S. ===
On 1 March, a United States Foreign Service officer stabbed a woman and his own dog to death and injured three other people during a road rage incident along the Capital Beltway. A responding police officer shot and killed the assailant.

=== Los Angeles, California, U.S. ===
On 22 March, five women were stabbed during a dispute at a restaurant in Downtown Los Angeles. Two women, including one of the injured, were arrested.

=== Raleigh, North Carolina, U.S. ===
On 11 April, six people were stabbed during a fight in downtown Raleigh. A man was criminally charged, but was released after video showed he acted in self-defense.

=== Jundiaí, São Paulo, Brazil ===
On 3 August, 48-year-old butcher Manoel Avelino da Silva stabbed three coworkers inside and Assaí Atacadista supermarket in Jundiaí, São Paulo.

=== London, U.K. ===
On 5 August, four men were stabbed in the Covent Garden area of London. A 47-year-old woman was arrested.

=== Lincoln, California, U.S. ===
On August 19, five People were stabbed in the Thunder Valley Casino Resort in California. a 22-year-old casino employee was arrested.

=== Kampala, Uganda ===
On August 20, five children, aged 5 through 15, were stabbed, two fatally, in their home. Their mother, who attempted to take her own life, was arrested at the scene of the crime.

== See also ==
- List of mass stabbing incidents (before 2010)
- List of mass stabbing incidents (2010–2019)
- List of mass stabbings by death toll
