= Bianjiang =

Town in Hunan, China

Bianjiang 便江镇
- Town
- Location in Hunan
- Country: People's Republic of China
- Province: Hunan
- Prefecture-level city: Chenzhou
- County: Yongxing County
- Time zone: UTC+8 (China Standard)

Bianjiang Town (Chinese: 便江镇; pinyin: Biànjiāng Zhèn) is a town and the county seat in the central south of Yongxing County, Hunan, China. The town was reformed through the amalgamation of Xiangyindu Town (Chinese: 湘阴渡镇), the former Bianjiang Town and Tangmenkou Town (Chinese: 塘门口镇) on November 27, 2015. It has an area of 359.3 km^{2} (138.7 sq mi) with a population of 303,000 (as of the end of 2015). Its seat is at Shuinan Village (Chinese: 水南村).
