= Baisha, Hunan =

Baisha 白沙镇
- Town
- Location in Hunan
- Coordinates: 26°9′48″N 112°40′39″E
- Country: People's Republic of China
- Province: Hunan
- Prefecture-level city: Hengyang
- County-level city: Changning
- Time zone: UTC+8 (China Standard)

Baisha (Chinese: 白沙) is a town of Changning, Hunan, China. As of 2018, it has two residential communities and 15 villages under its administration.
