= Quanfeng =

Quanfeng Subdistrict 泉峰街道
- subdistrict
- Location within Hunan
- Coordinates: 26°24′05″N 112°23′46″E
- Country: People's Republic of China
- Province: Hunan
- Prefecture: Hengyang
- County-level city: Changning
- Divisions: 5 communities and 4 villages

Area
  - Total: 29 km^{2} (11 sq mi)

Population (2010 census)
  - Total: 56,785
  - Density: 2,000/km^{2} (5,100/sq mi)
- Time zone: UTC+8 (China Standard)
- Area code: 0734
- Languages: Standard and Gan Chinese

Quanfeng Subdistrict (Chinese: 泉峰街道; pinyin: Quánfēng Jiēdào) is a subdistrict of Changning City in Hunan, China. The subdistrict was one of 4 subdistricts approved to establish in 2008. It has an area of 29 km^{2} (11 sq mi) with a population of 56,785 (as of 2010 census). The subdistrict of Quanfeng has 4 villages and 5 communities under its jurisdiction.

== History ==
The subdistrict of Quanfeng was approved to form from 7 villages of Xialian (夏联), Chajian (茶箭), Qingshi (青市), Qushi (曲市), Xueqiang (学墙), Lengshui (冷水) and Nanshi (南市), 6 communities of Chengnan (城南), Quanfeng (泉峰), Laodonglu (劳动路), Shenglilu (胜利路), Yidong (宜东) and Songyi (嵩宜) of the former Yiyang Town (宜阳镇) in 2008, named after the Qianfeng Temple (泉峰观).

== Subdivisions ==
Through the merger of village-level divisions in 2016, its divisions was reduced to 9 from 13. The subdistrict of Quanfeng has 5 communities and 4 villages under its jurisdiction.

5 communities

- Chengnan Community (城南社区)
- Dongyi Community (东宜社区)
- Laodonglu Community (劳动路社区)
- Quanfeng Community (泉峰社区)
- Shenglilu Community (胜利路社区)

4 villages

- Nanshui Village (南水村)
- Qushi Village (曲市村)
- Xialian Village (夏联村)
- Xueqiang Village (学墙村)
