= Longtan, Guiyang =

Subdistrict of Guiyang County, Hunan, China

Coordinates: 25°44′16″N 112°43′37″E

Longtan Subdistrict (Chinese: 龙潭街道; pinyin: Lóngtán Jiēdào) is a subdistrict and the county seat of Guiyang County in Hunan, China. The town was formed through the amalgamation of 4 communities of the former Chengguan Town (Chinese: 城关镇), 3 villages of the former Chengjiao Township (Chinese: 城郊乡), Wutong Village (Chinese: 梧桐村) of Renyi Town (Chinese: 仁义镇), Shanbei Village (Chinese: 山背村) of Zhangshi Town (Chinese: 樟市镇) and 3 state-owned farms in 2012. It has an area of 75.1 km^{2} (29.0 sq mi) with a population of 52,300 (as of 2012), and its seat is at Bazitang Community (Chinese: 八字塘社区).

== See also ==
- List of township-level divisions of Hunan
