= Yongxing County =

Yongxing County 永兴县 Yunghing
- County
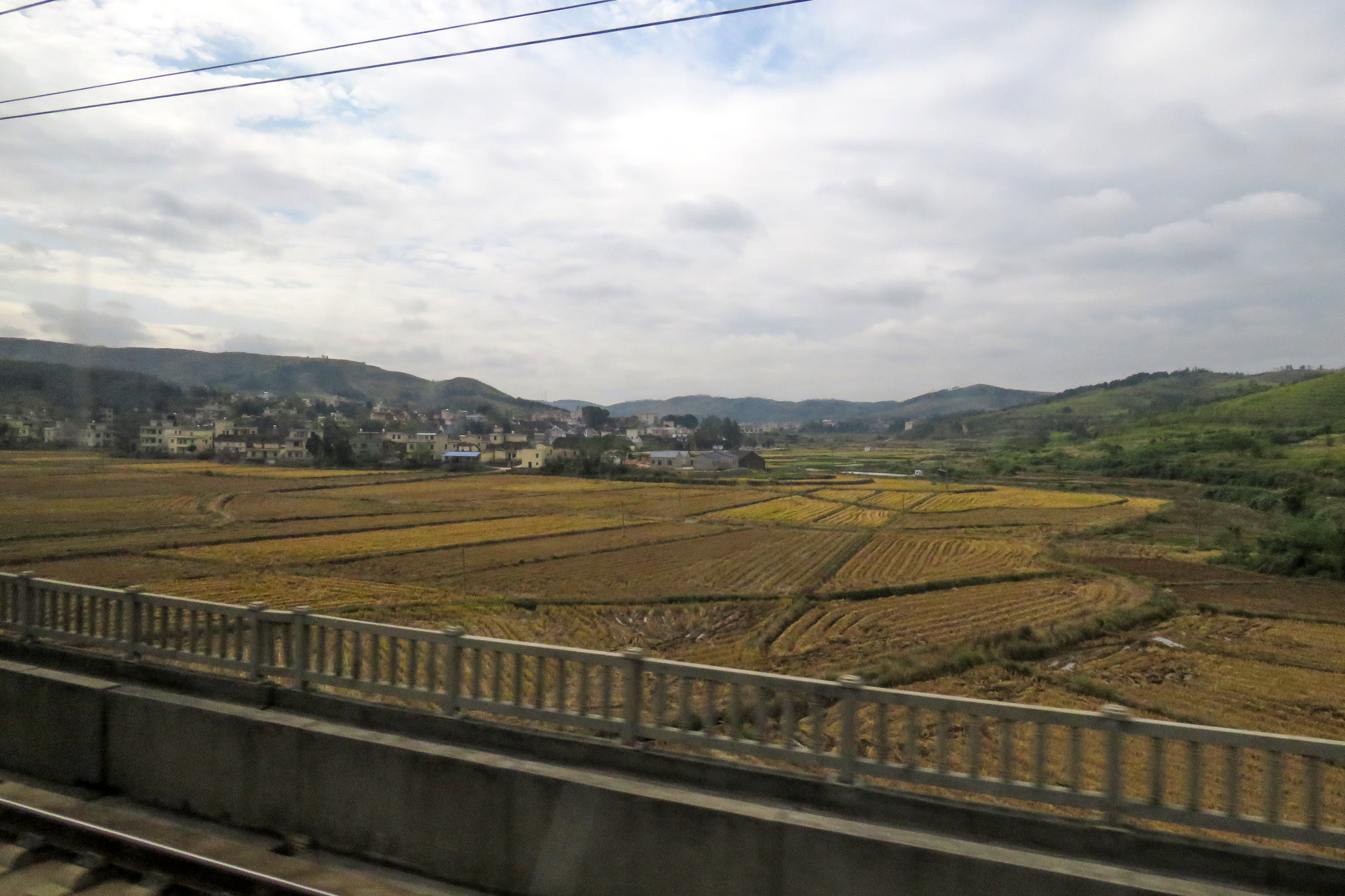
- Yangtang Township

- Location in Hunan
- Coordinates: 26°07′26″N 113°06′50″E
- Country: People's Republic of China
- Province: Hunan
- Prefecture-level city: Chenzhou
- Time zone: UTC+8 (China Standard)
- Postal code: 4233XX

Yongxing County (simplified Chinese: 永兴县; traditional Chinese: 永興縣; pinyin: Yǒngxīng Xiàn) is a county in Hunan Province, China. It is under the administration of the prefecture-level city of Chenzhou.

Located on the south eastern part of the province, it is adjacent to the north of the city proper in Chenzhou. The county borders to the northwest by Leiyang City, to the southwest by Guiyang County, to the south by Suxian District, to the southeast by Zixing City, and to the northeast by Anren County. Yongxing County covers an area of 1,979 km^{2} (764 sq mi), and as of 2015, it had a registered population of 696,000 and a resident population of 542,800. The county has 11 towns and four townships under its jurisdiction, and the county seat is Bianjiang Town (便江镇).

== Administrative divisions ==
11 towns

- Bianjiang (便江镇)
- Bolin (柏林镇)
- Gaotingsi (高亭司镇)
- Huangni (黄泥镇)
- Jingui (金龟镇)
- Liyutang (鲤鱼塘镇)
- Matian (马田镇)
- Taihe (太和镇)
- Youma (油麻镇)
- Yuelai (悦来镇)
- Zhangshu (樟树镇)

4 townships

- Dabujiang (大布江乡)
- Longxingshi (龙形市乡)
- Qijia (七甲乡)
- Yangtang (洋塘乡)

== Climate ==
Climate data for Yongxing, elevation 168 m (551 ft), (1991–2020 normals, extremes 1981–2010)
Month	Jan	Feb	Mar	Apr	May	Jun	Jul	Aug	Sep	Oct	Nov	Dec	Year
Record high °C (°F)	27.0 (80.6)	32.8 (91.0)	34.7 (94.5)	36.0 (96.8)	36.2 (97.2)	38.7 (101.7)	40.5 (104.9)	40.5 (104.9)	38.2 (100.8)	37.3 (99.1)	34.2 (93.6)	27.4 (81.3)	40.5 (104.9)
Mean daily maximum °C (°F)	10.3 (50.5)	13.5 (56.3)	17.5 (63.5)	24.0 (75.2)	28.2 (82.8)	31.4 (88.5)	34.6 (94.3)	33.6 (92.5)	29.9 (85.8)	24.8 (76.6)	19.3 (66.7)	13.2 (55.8)	23.4 (74.0)
Daily mean °C (°F)	6.4 (43.5)	9.0 (48.2)	12.7 (54.9)	18.7 (65.7)	23.0 (73.4)	26.5 (79.7)	29.0 (84.2)	28.0 (82.4)	24.5 (76.1)	19.3 (66.7)	13.7 (56.7)	8.3 (46.9)	18.3 (64.9)
Mean daily minimum °C (°F)	3.8 (38.8)	6.0 (42.8)	9.7 (49.5)	15.0 (59.0)	19.4 (66.9)	23.0 (73.4)	24.8 (76.6)	24.2 (75.6)	20.9 (69.6)	15.6 (60.1)	10.1 (50.2)	5.1 (41.2)	14.8 (58.6)
Record low °C (°F)	−4.8 (23.4)	−3.5 (25.7)	−3.2 (26.2)	3.0 (37.4)	9.8 (49.6)	13.8 (56.8)	17.6 (63.7)	18.3 (64.9)	12.9 (55.2)	3.2 (37.8)	−1.1 (30.0)	−8.0 (17.6)	−8.0 (17.6)
Average precipitation mm (inches)	80.4 (3.17)	94.9 (3.74)	172.4 (6.79)	170.9 (6.73)	184.7 (7.27)	221.4 (8.72)	136.9 (5.39)	157.7 (6.21)	68.9 (2.71)	60.5 (2.38)	76.8 (3.02)	61.1 (2.41)	1,486.6 (58.54)
Average precipitation days (≥ 0.1 mm)	15.9	15.2	19.5	17.5	17.2	15.4	10.6	13.4	10.4	10.1	11.6	12.0	168.8
Average snowy days	2.5	1.2	0.2	0	0	0	0	0	0	0	0	0.7	4.6
Average relative humidity (%)	84	84	85	82	82	81	74	78	80	80	82	81	81
Mean monthly sunshine hours	52.8	58.7	64.9	93.7	121.6	143.3	233.4	189.0	145.2	126.5	107.0	87.9	1,424
Percentage possible sunshine	16	18	17	24	29	35	56	47	40	36	33	27	32
Source: China Meteorological Administration

== Transportation ==
Yongxing's transport links include the National Highway 212, the Beijing to Guangzhou Railway and the Beijing to Zhuhai Expressway constitute a transport network covering this area that allows local people to make one-day round-trip to cities like Changsha to the north or Guangzhou to the south.

== Economy ==
Silver is an important industry in Yongxing, which is nicknamed "China's Silver Capital". As of 2003, Yongxing's GDP reached 3.68 billion yuan and its public revenue was 245 million yuan. The average annual personal income of its urban and rural residents was 6,820 and 3,304 yuan, respectively.
