= Peiyuan =

Peiyuan Subdistrict 培元街道
- subdistrict
- Location within Hunan
- Coordinates: 26°23′53″N 112°23′02″E
- Country: People's Republic of China
- Province: Hunan
- Prefecture: Hengyang
- County-level city: Changning
- Divisions: 4 communities and 7 villages

Area
  - Total: 16.59 km^{2} (6.41 sq mi)

Population (2010 census)
  - Total: 24,959
  - Density: 1,504/km^{2} (3,897/sq mi)
- Time zone: UTC+8 (China Standard)
- Area code: 0734
- Languages: Standard and Gan Chinese

Peiyuan Subdistrict (Chinese: 培元街道; pinyin: Péiyuán Jiēdào) is a subdistrict of Changning City in Hunan, China. It was one of 4 subdistricts approved to establish in 2008. It has an area of 16.59 km^{2} (6.41 sq mi) with a population of 24,959 (as of 2010 census). The subdistrict of Peiyuan has 6 villages and 4 communities under its jurisdiction.

== History ==
The subdistrict of Peiyuan was approved to form from 7 villages of Dali (大立村), Tangshan (塘山村), Huxi (虎溪村), Lianhua (莲花村), Liangjiang (两江村), Huangzhi (黄枝村) and Jinqiao (金桥村), 3 communities of Chengxi (城西社区), Xishang (西上社区) and Taojiang (桃江社区) of the former Yiyang Town (宜阳镇) in 2008, named after the Tower of Peiyuan (培元塔).

== Subdivisions ==
Through the merger of village-level divisions in 2016, its divisions was reduced to 6 from 10. The subdistrict of Peiyuan has 3 communities and 3 villages under its jurisdiction.

3 villages

- Huxi Village (虎溪村)
- Lianhua Village (莲花村)
- Peiyuan Village (培元村)

3 communities

- Liangjiang Community (两江社区)
- Taojiang Community (桃江社区)
- Xishang Community (西上社区)
