= Taihe, Yongxing County =

Taihe 太和镇
- Town
- Location in Hunan
- Coordinates: 26°18′43″N 113°13′34″E
- Country: People's Republic of China
- Province: Hunan
- Prefecture-level city: Chenzhou
- County: Yongxing County
- Time zone: UTC+8 (China Standard)

Taihe (Chinese: 太和; pinyin: Tàihé) is a town under the administration of Yongxing County, Hunan, China. As of 2020, it administers Taihe Residential Community and the following ten villages:

- Taihe Village
- Yangxia Village (样下村)
- Yantang Village (盐塘村)
- Shuanghe Village (双合村)
- Dingshang Village (顶上村)
- Wuhe Village (五合村)
- Wuluo Village (乌萝村)
- Qilang Village (七郎村)
- Sibian Village (寺边村)
- Lianyu Village (鲢鱼村)
