= Heye, Guiyang County =

Heye Town
- Town

Chinese transcription(s)
  - Simplified: 荷叶镇
  - Traditional: 荷葉鎮
  - Pinyin: Héyè Zhèn
- Location in Hunan
- Coordinates: 25°30′28″N 112°42′16″E
- Country: China
- Province: Hunan
- Prefecture: Chenzhou
- County: Guiyang County

Area
  - Total: 80.4 km^{2} (31.0 sq mi)
- Elevation: 585 m (1,919 ft)

Population (2011)
  - Total: 27,600
  - Density: 343/km^{2} (889/sq mi)
- Time zone: UTC+8 (China Standard)
- Postal code: 424418
- Area code: 0735

Heye Town (Chinese: 荷叶镇) is a rural town in Guiyang County, Hunan, China. As of the 2011 census it had a population of 27,600 and an area of 80.4 square kilometres (31.0 sq mi). It borders Lutang Town in the east and north, Jinjiang Town in the south, and Fangyuan Town in the west.

== Administrative division ==
As of 2011, it include 15 villages: Xinshi (新市村), Xintang (新塘村), Gantang (干塘村), Laopu (老铺村), Lianglukou (两路口村), Tanxi (潭溪村), Gaoshan (高山村), Shuibian (水边村), Shangchong (上冲村), Heye (荷叶村), Shantian (山田村), Tangjiadong (塘家洞村), Shuiyuan (水源村), Xiagu (下故村), and Tangjia (唐家村), and 2 communities: Shentangyu (神堂圩) and Heye Coal Mine (荷叶煤矿).

== History ==
In 1527 during the Ming dynasty, it known as "Chaozongli" (Chinese: 南乡朝宗里). In 1640, it belonged to Jinshan Township (Chinese: 金三乡). In 1930 it came under the jurisdiction of the Second District of Guiyang County. After the founding of the Communist State in 1956, Heye Township was established. In July 1961 it was renamed "Heye People's Commune". In July 1996 it was upgraded to a town.

== Geography ==
The average altitude of Heye is 585 metres (1,919 ft) above sea level. The highest point in the town is Jinxianzhai (Chinese: 金仙寨), which, at 1,250 metres (4,100 ft) above sea level. The lowest point is Guanxiashui (Chinese: 观下水), which stands 280 metres (920 ft) above sea level.

The town has a subtropical humid monsoon climate. The frost-free period averaged 200 days per year. The average annual sunshine is 1800 hours. The annual average precipitation is 1400 to 1700 mm.

== Economy ==
The town's main industries are agriculture and mining. Coal and graphite are major mineral resources. The main cash crops are rice, konjac, ginger, chili pepper and kiwifruit.

== Education ==
As of 2011, there are 10 kindergartens, 15 primary schools and one middle school in the town.

== Culture ==
Huaguxi is the most influential local theater.

== Attractions ==
The main attractions are the Chaoquan (Chinese: 潮泉) and Jinxianzhai.

== Transportation ==
The Provincial Highway S214 passes across the town north to south.

== See also ==
- List of township-level divisions of Hunan
