= Leiyang =

Leiyang 耒阳市
- County-level city
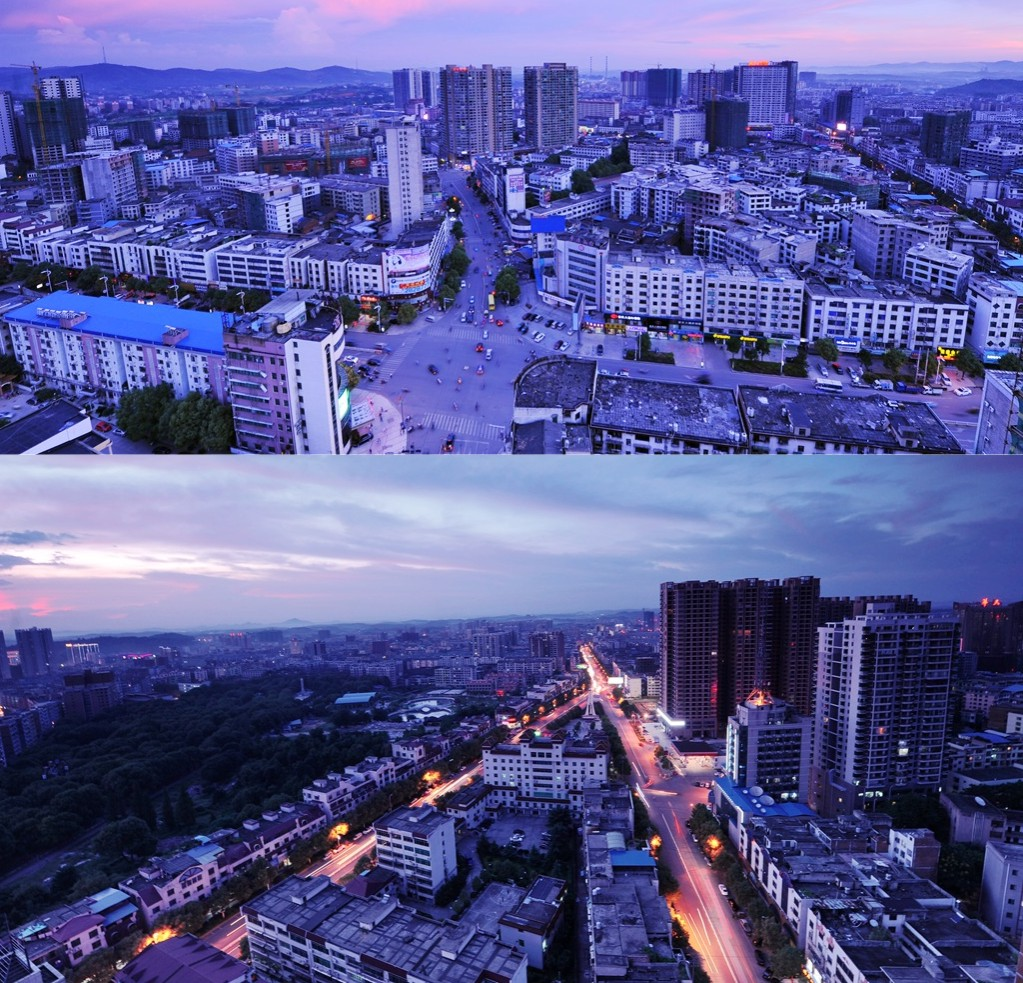
- Leiyang in 2014

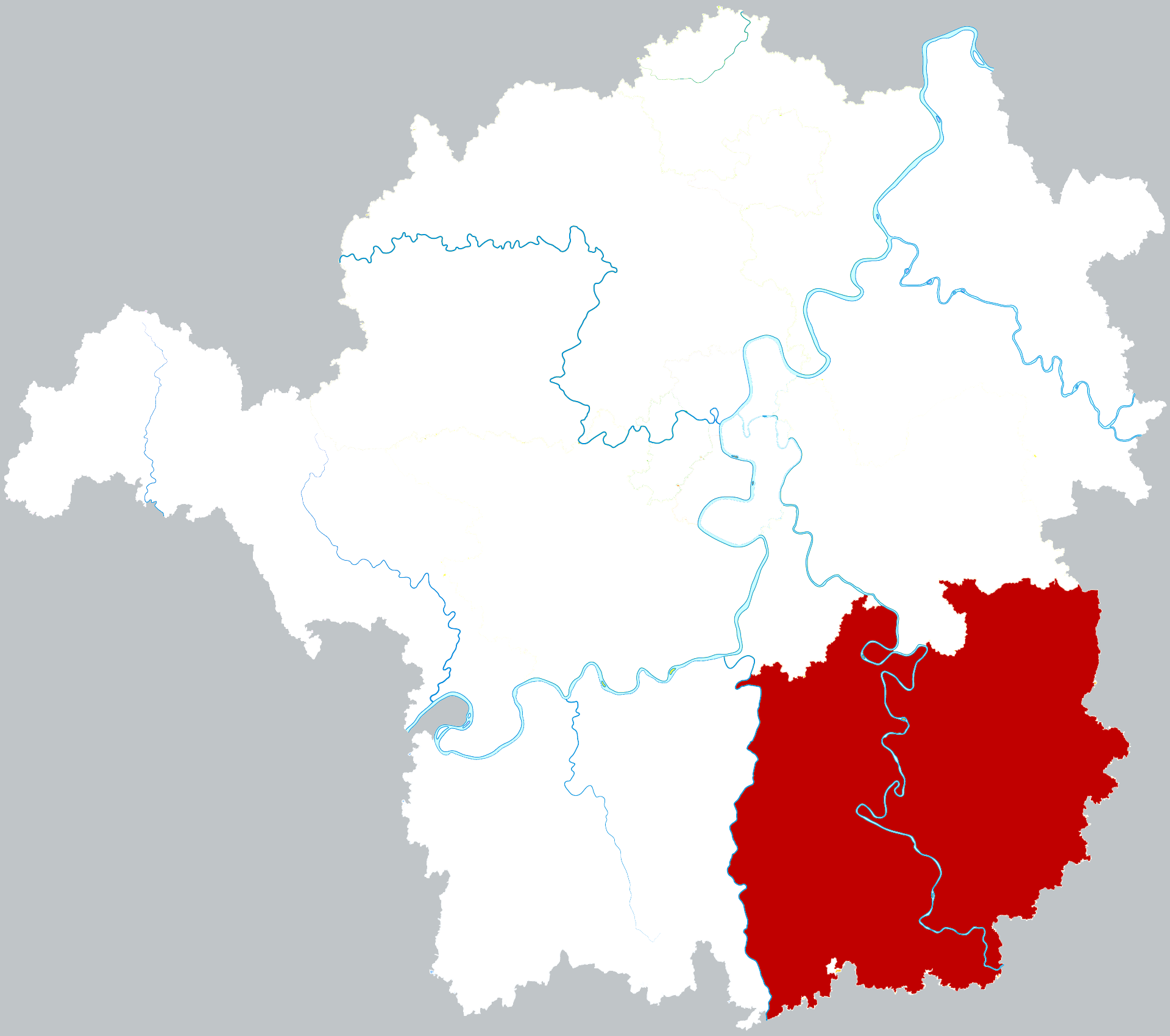
- Location in Hengyang

- Location in Hunan
- Coordinates: 26°25′20″N 112°51′35″E
- Country: People's Republic of China
- Province: Hunan
- Prefecture-level city: Hengyang

Area
  - County-level city: 2,656 km^{2} (1,025 sq mi)
  - Urban: 49.65 km^{2} (19.17 sq mi)

Population (2010)
  - County-level city: 1,150,241
  - Estimate (2017): 1,798,000
  - Density: 433.1/km^{2} (1,122/sq mi)
  - Urban: 569,000
- Time zone: UTC+8 (China Standard)
- Website: leiyang.gov.cn

Leiyang (simplified Chinese: 耒阳; traditional Chinese: 耒陽; pinyin: Lěiyáng) is a county-level city and the third most populous county-level division in Hunan Province, China. Leiyang is under the administration of the prefecture-level city of Hengyang. Located on the south of the province, the city is bordered to the north by Hengnan County, to the west by Changning City, to the south by Guiyang and Yongxing counties, and to the east by Anren County. Leiyang City covers 2,656 km^{2} (1,025 sq mi) with a registered population of 1,413,913 and resident population of 1,150,241 (as of the 2010 census). The city has six subdistricts, 19 towns and five townships under its jurisdiction. The government seat is Caizichi Subdistrict.

== History ==
Leiyang is the hometown of Cai Lun, the inventor of papermaking technology, one of the Four Great Inventions. It has more than 2,000 years of history as an ancient city named after the north of Lei River. Archaeological excavation proved that as early as the Neolithic Age, people have lived in the territory of Leiyang.

Until Leiyang was built as a division, it was a part of Jingzhou, one of the Nine Provinces before the Spring and Autumn period and a part of Chu State in the Warring States period. In the 26th year of the reign of Qin Shi Huang (221 BC), Lei County (Chinese: 耒县) was formed and took its name after the Lei River, it was part of Changsha Commandery. Dividing Changsha Commandery into Changsha State and Guiyang Commandery (Chinese: 桂阳郡; not to be confused with present-day Guiyang County) in 202 BC, Guiyang Commandery was formed from the southern portion of Changsha Commandery, the county of Lei was renamed to Leiyang and part of Guiyang Commandery.

In the Three Kingdoms period (220–280 AD), Leiyang was the territory of the Wu state. In 257 AD, the county of Leiyang was divided into four counties, that the two counties of Xinping (Chinese: 新平县) and Xinning (Chinese: 新宁县) were located on the western side of Chongling River, and the two counties of Leiyang and Liyang (Chinese: 利阳县) on the eastern side of Chongling River and western bank of Lei River. The three counties of Xinping, Xinning and Liyang were located in Xiangdong Commandery (Chinese: 湘东郡) and the county of Leiyang in Guiyang Commandery.

In 395 AD, the county of Liyang was merged to Leiyang. The county of Leiyang was renamed to Leiyin (Chinese: 耒阴县) in 589 and restored the name of Leiyang in 621. In the Five Dynasties and Ten Kingdoms period (907–960 AD), Leiyang was the territory of the Machu State. The county of Leiyang was renamed to Laiyang (Chinese: 来阳县) during the Song dynasty and restored the name during the Yuan dynasty. In November 1986, the county of Leiyang was reorganized as a county-level city.

== Geography ==
=== Climate ===
Climate data for Leiyang, elevation 135 m (443 ft), (1991–2020 normals, extremes 1981–2010)
Month	Jan	Feb	Mar	Apr	May	Jun	Jul	Aug	Sep	Oct	Nov	Dec	Year
Record high °C (°F)	27.8 (82.0)	32.4 (90.3)	35.9 (96.6)	37.0 (98.6)	36.5 (97.7)	38.0 (100.4)	40.3 (104.5)	41.1 (106.0)	38.1 (100.6)	36.7 (98.1)	34.2 (93.6)	26.4 (79.5)	41.1 (106.0)
Mean daily maximum °C (°F)	9.7 (49.5)	12.7 (54.9)	16.9 (62.4)	23.6 (74.5)	28.0 (82.4)	31.1 (88.0)	34.4 (93.9)	33.5 (92.3)	29.6 (85.3)	24.4 (75.9)	18.7 (65.7)	12.5 (54.5)	22.9 (73.3)
Daily mean °C (°F)	6.3 (43.3)	8.9 (48.0)	12.8 (55.0)	18.9 (66.0)	23.3 (73.9)	26.8 (80.2)	29.5 (85.1)	28.5 (83.3)	24.8 (76.6)	19.6 (67.3)	14.0 (57.2)	8.4 (47.1)	18.5 (65.3)
Mean daily minimum °C (°F)	4.0 (39.2)	6.3 (43.3)	10.0 (50.0)	15.6 (60.1)	20.0 (68.0)	23.6 (74.5)	25.9 (78.6)	25.1 (77.2)	21.5 (70.7)	16.2 (61.2)	10.7 (51.3)	5.5 (41.9)	15.4 (59.7)
Record low °C (°F)	−4.2 (24.4)	−5.3 (22.5)	−1.1 (30.0)	3.3 (37.9)	9.9 (49.8)	13.6 (56.5)	18.3 (64.9)	17.9 (64.2)	13.2 (55.8)	3.8 (38.8)	−0.6 (30.9)	−6.5 (20.3)	−6.5 (20.3)
Average precipitation mm (inches)	81.5 (3.21)	90.0 (3.54)	170.3 (6.70)	155.2 (6.11)	174.5 (6.87)	201.0 (7.91)	138.2 (5.44)	131.5 (5.18)	74.3 (2.93)	67.8 (2.67)	84.4 (3.32)	59.6 (2.35)	1,428.3 (56.23)
Average precipitation days (≥ 0.1 mm)	15.4	14.6	18.6	16.8	16.2	15.0	9.9	12.1	9.9	9.7	11.0	11.0	160.2
Average snowy days	2.7	1.3	0.3	0	0	0	0	0	0	0	0	0.8	5.1
Average relative humidity (%)	83	82	83	81	80	80	72	76	79	78	79	79	79
Mean monthly sunshine hours	55.8	61.4	69.2	99.8	127.3	143.6	236.4	195.8	145.9	128.8	110.5	93.6	1,468.1
Percentage possible sunshine	17	19	19	26	31	35	56	49	40	36	34	29	33
Source: China Meteorological Administration

== Subdivision ==
6 subdistricts

- Caizichi (蔡子池街道)
- Sanjia (三架街道)
- Shuidongjiang (水东江街道)
- Wulipai (五里牌街道)
- Yuqing (余庆街道)
- Zaoshijie (灶市街街道)

19 towns

- Daozi (导子镇)
- Dashi (大市镇)
- Dayi (大义镇)
- Donghuxu (东湖圩镇)
- Feitian (淝田镇)
- Gongpingxu (公平圩镇)
- Huangshi (黄市镇)
- Longtang (龙塘镇)
- Mashui (马水镇)
- Nanjing (南京镇)
- Nanyang (南阳镇)
- Renyi (仁义镇)
- Sandu (三都镇)
- Xiaoshui (小水镇)
- Xiatang (夏塘镇)
- Xinshi (新市镇)
- Yaotian (遥田镇)
- Yongji (永济镇)
- Zheqiao (哲桥镇)

5 townships

- Changping (长坪乡)
- Dahexu (大和圩乡)
- Liangyuan (亮源乡)
- Taipingxu (太平圩乡)
- Tanxia (坛下乡)

== Economy ==
According to preliminary accounting of the statistical authority, the gross domestic product of Leiyang City in 2017 was 47,315 million yuan (7,001 million US dollars), up by 8.1 percent over the previous year. Of this total, the value added of the primary industry was 7,100 million yuan (1,050 million US dollars), up by 3.7 percent, that of the secondary industry was 16,321 million yuan (2,415 million US dollars), up by 3.2 percent and that of the tertiary industry was 23,894 million yuan (3,535 million US dollars), up by 13.3 percent. The value added of the primary industry accounted for 15.01 percent of the GDP; that of the secondary industry accounted for 34.49 percent; and that of the tertiary industry accounted for 50.50 percent. The per capita GDP in 2017 was 40,708 yuan (6,023 US dollars).

Leiyang is a center of paper production. Other raw materials produced in the area today include kaolin, white marble, and "heavy calcium carbonate".

Some of the newer large homes in Leiyang were built by drillers working in Shenzhen. By 2019, due to age and health problems such as silicosis, many of these migrant construction workers had returned to Hunan.

=== Industry ===
Territory of large reserves of kaolin, is a good paper stock. Yipo abundant coal resources, reserves of anthracite forecast close to 10 million tons. Forest fir, pine, South bamboo, tea.

== Transportation ==
Guangzhou Railway, Leiyang Station, located stove Street neighborhood offices G4 Hong Kong and Macao Expressway, Leiyang territory of New Town, Leiyang, three high-speed intersection fair 107 State Road, north to south S320 Provincial Highway, east–west, east to Chaling, heading for Qiyang Away from Narita Airport, a military airport Leishui shipping Beijing-Guangzhou high-speed rail (Wuhan-Guangzhou passenger dedicated line), Leiyang West Railway Station, located west direction along the three district offices, 2009 started as a four-wire dual platform.

== Culture ==
=== Language ===
Leiyang's dialect is usually placed in the Gan Chinese family and is distinct from the Hengyang dialect of Xiang Chinese. Linguist Zhong Longlin, who studied the dialect during the 1980s, classified it within the Hakka family rather than Gan. Hakka and Gan are generally considered to be closely related; Laurent Sagart proposes that they are descended from a common ancestor which split from other Chinese dialect families during the Song Dynasty.

=== Leisure and entertainment ===
Leiyang Recreation Center at the Martyrs Cemetery developed informally. At Wuyi Square, fewer people engage in fitness and entertainment during the 1990s, but it sees high attendance from 7:00 p.m. to 9:00 p.m.; the public chooses nearest locations such as Inventor Square and Dragon Square. Fifty-one Cinema is located in the center of Wuyi Road, a prominent commercial area in Leiyang. Du Park, situated along the Lei River in Dongzhou, is associated with Du Fu, who died and was originally buried there before being moved to Leiyang No. 1 High School. Inventor Square and Dragon Square are the largest plazas in Leiyang, used by younger residents for skating and skateboarding, and by older residents for aerobics and conversation. Cai Lun Park, formerly the site of a stage, serves as a public leisure and entertainment area. Yanhe features numerous snack stalls and karaoke venues.

In recent years, Leiyang's cultural and entertainment sector produced nearly 50 million yuan annually, with profits exceeding 34 million yuan and tax payments over 1,600 yuan.

=== In literature ===
According to the historical novel Romance of the Three Kingdoms, Pang Tong was chosen as magistrate of Leiyang by Liu Bei. After three years he had failed to fulfill the duties of his office. Many were upset by his failure and appealed to Liu Bei. Liu Bei sent Zhang Fei, his sworn brother, to Leiyang to investigate. Before Zhang Fei arrived, Pang Tong, who knew that Zhang Fei loved wine, ordered that all wine must be diluted with water. Once Zhang Fei arrived, true to his reputation, he consumed copious amounts of wine, but wondered why he never became drunk. He realized what was going on and became very angry with Pang Tong. In order to appease Zhang Fei, Pang Tong agreed to finish the three years worth of backlogged cases within three days, which he did. For this, Pang Tong was promoted by Liu Bei and to honor the occasion, a special wine was created, now known as Zhang Fei Wine.
