= Mashui Township =

Town of Leiyang City, Hunan, China

Coordinates: 26°39′31″N 113°03′01″E

Mashui (Chinese: 马水) is a township in Leiyang, Hunan province.

It includes Pingtian (Chinese: 坪田) village where there's a Chenjia Wan (Chinese: 陈家湾).
