= Taihe, Meishan =

Taihe 太和镇
- Town
- Location in Sichuan
- Coordinates: 30°6′36″N 103°51′28″E
- Country: People's Republic of China
- Province: Sichuan
- Prefecture-level city: Meishan
- District: Dongpo District
- Time zone: UTC+8 (China Standard)

Taihe (Chinese: 太和; pinyin: Tàihé) is a town under the administration of Dongpo District, Meishan, Sichuan, China. As of 2020, it has three residential neighborhoods and 12 villages under its administration:

Neighborhoods

- Yuexing Community (悦兴社区)
- Longting Community (龙亭社区)
- Dalin Community (大林社区)

Villages

- Longshi Village (龙石村)
- Xianqiao Village (仙桥村)
- Yongfeng Village (永丰村)
- Sanjiang Village (三江村)
- Yuanguang Village (远光村)
- Yuanbao Village (元宝村)
- Mayan Village (马堰村)
- Siwei Village (四维村)
- Qunfu Village (群富村)
- Liandun Village (莲墩村)
- Jinguang Village (金光村)
- Luojia Village (罗家村)
