= Taihe Subdistrict, Xuyi County =

Taihe Subdistrict 太和街道
- Subdistrict
- Location in Jiangsu
- Coordinates: 33°0′12″N 118°29′59″E
- Country: People's Republic of China
- Province: Jiangsu
- Prefecture-level city: Huai'an
- County: Xuyi County
- Time zone: UTC+8 (China Standard)

Taihe Subdistrict (Chinese: 太和街道; pinyin: Tàihé Jiēdào) is a subdistrict in Xuyi County, Jiangsu, China. As of 2020, it has three residential neighborhoods and two villages under its administration:

Neighborhoods

- Taihe
- Youfa (友法)
- Maoying (毛营)

Villages

- Mangang Village (漫岗村)
- Santang Village (三塘村)

== See also ==
- List of township-level divisions of Jiangsu
