= Taihe Subdistrict, Kunming =

Taihe Subdistrict 太和街道
- Subdistrict
- Location in Yunnan
- Coordinates: 25°1′54″N 102°43′16″E
- Country: People's Republic of China
- Province: Yunnan
- Prefecture-level city: Kunming
- District: Guandu District
- Time zone: UTC+8 (China Standard)

Taihe Subdistrict (Chinese: 太和街道; pinyin: Tàihé Jiēdào) is a subdistrict in Guandu District, Kunming, Yunnan, China. As of 2020, it has eight residential neighborhoods under its administration:

- Heping Road Community (和平路社区)
- Yongsheng Road Community (永胜路社区)
- Mingtong Road Community (明通路社区)
- Qianwei Road Community (前卫路社区)
- Shuanglongqiao Community (双龙桥社区)
- Huangjiazhuang Community (黄家庄社区)
- Wujing Community (吴井社区)
- Erjiawan Community (佴家湾社区)

== See also ==
- List of township-level divisions of Yunnan
