= Taihe, Qingyuan =

Taihe 太和镇
- Town
- Location in Guangdong
- Coordinates: 23°44′29″N 113°0′27″E
- Country: People's Republic of China
- Province: Guangdong
- Prefecture-level city: Qingyuan
- District: Qingxin District
- Time zone: UTC+8 (China Standard)

Taihe (Chinese: 太和; pinyin: Tàihé) is a town under the administration of Qingxin District, Qingyuan, Guangdong, China. As of 2020, it has seven residential neighborhoods and 11 villages under its administration:

Neighborhoods

- Xiangqun Community (向群社区)
- Xuanzhen Community (玄真社区)
- Mingxia Community (明霞社区)
- Xihe Community (西河社区)
- Jianshe Community (建设社区)
- Feishui Community (飞水社区)
- Chengxi Community (城西社区)

Villages

- Huangkeng Village (黄坑村)
- Leyuan Village (乐园村)
- Zhoutian Village (周田村)
- Feishui Village (飞水村)
- Tajiao Village (塔脚村)
- Gaoxing Village (告星村)
- Wuxing Village (五星村)
- Jingtang Village (井塘村)
- Xinzhou Village (新洲村)
- Bailian Village (白莲村)
- Wanshou Village (万寿村)
