= Jiucailing =

Mountain in Hunan, China

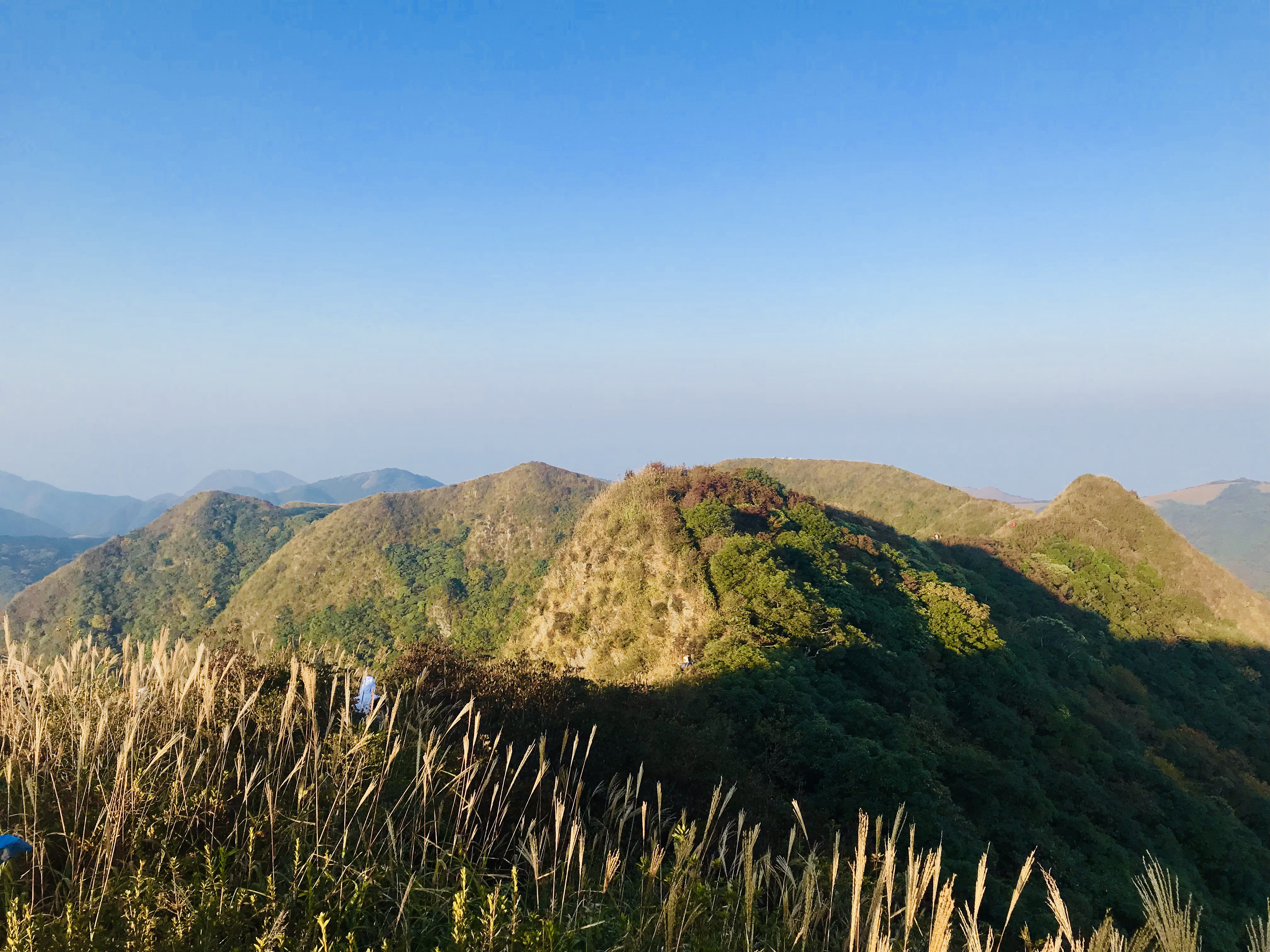
- Jiucailing.

Highest point
- Elevation: 2,009.3-metre (6,592 ft)
- Prominence: 1,739 m (5,705 ft)
- Listing: Ultra, Ribu
- Coordinates: 25°30′54.03″N 111°19′48.72″E

Naming
- Native name: 韭菜岭 (Chinese)

Geography
- Location within Hunan
- Location: Dao County, Hunan
- Country: China

Jiucailing (simplified Chinese: 韭菜岭; traditional Chinese: 韭菜嶺; pinyin: Jiǔcàilǐng; lit. 'Ridge of Chinese Chive') is a 2,009.3 metres (6,592 ft) mountain in Dao County, Hunan, China. It is the main peak of Dupang Mountains.

== Geography ==
Jiucailing abounds with alpine plants. The main wild animals in the mountain are Cabot's tragopan, Macaque, Flying squirrel, Pangolin, Hoplobatrachus tigerinus, Baeolophus, and Chrysolophus.
