= Zhangshu, Yongxing County =

Zhangshu 樟树镇
- Town
- Location in Hunan
- Coordinates: 26°23′19″N 113°12′16″E
- Country: People's Republic of China
- Province: Hunan
- Prefecture-level city: Chenzhou
- County: Yongxing County
- Time zone: UTC+8 (China Standard)

Zhangshu (simplified Chinese: 樟树; traditional Chinese: 樟樹; pinyin: Zhāngshù) is a town under the administration of Yongxing County, in southeastern Hunan, China. As of 2018, it has one residential community and 12 villages under its administration.
