= Chongling River =

River in Hunan, China

Coordinates: 26°36′08″N 112°37′06″E

Designations

Ramsar Wetland
- Official name: Hunan Chongling Wetlands
- Designated: 28 October 2022
- Reference no.: 2519

The Chongling River (Chinese: 舂陵水), also known as Jiao River (Chinese: 茭河) and Lingyuan River (Chinese: 菱源河), is a right-bank tributary and one of the largest tributaries of the middle Xiang River in Hunan, China. The river rises in the Renxingling Mountains (Chinese: 人形岭) of Lanshan County. Its main stream runs generally south to north through Lansghan, Jiahe, Xintian, Xintian, Leiyang, Changning and Hengnan counties, and it joins the Xiang at Jiaohekou (Chinese: 茭河口) of Hengnan. The Chongling River has a length of 223 kilometres (139 mi), with its tributaries, and the drainage basin covers an area of 6,623 square kilometres (2,557 sq mi). The middle reaches of the river have been designated as a protected Ramsar site since 2022.
