= Taihe, Guiyang County =

Taihe 太和镇
- Town
- Location in Hunan
- Coordinates: 25.6167°N 112.7234°E
- Country: People's Republic of China
- Province: Hunan
- Prefecture-level city: Chenzhou
- County: Guiyang County
- Time zone: UTC+8 (China Standard)

Taihe (Chinese: 太和; pinyin: Tàihé) is a town under the administration of Guiyang County, Hunan, China. As of 2020, it administers Taihe Residential Community and the following 13 villages:

- Wantang Village (湾塘村)
- Zhutang Village (珠塘村)
- Tansha Village (潭沙村)
- Sheyuan Village (社员村)
- Dijie Village (地界村)
- Shenxia Village (神下村)
- Chetian Village (车田村)
- Changle Village (长乐村)
- Qinghe Village (清和村)
- Xikou Village (溪口村)
- Dangjia Village (当家村)
- Tuanjie Village (团结村)
- Furong Yao Ethnic Village (芙蓉瑶族村)

== See also ==
- List of township-level divisions of Hunan
