= Guan River =

River in Guangxi, China

Coordinates: 25°55′16″N 111°04′29″E

The Guan River (Chinese: 灌江), also known as Guanyang River (Chinese: 灌阳河), is a right-bank tributary of the upper Xiang River in Guilin, Guangxi, China. The river rises in Liziping (Chinese: 犁子坪) of Dazhuyuan Village (Chinese: 大竹园村), Dongjing Township, Guanyang County. Its main stream runs generally southwest to northeast through Guanyang and Jiahe counties, and it joins the Xiang at Xiaonan Village (Chinese: 水南村) of Quanzhou Town, Quanzhou. The Guan River has a length of 176.63 kilometres (109.75 mi), with its tributaries, and the drainage basin covers an area of 2,285.7 square kilometres (882.5 sq mi).
