= Yiyang Subdistrict =

Yiyang Subdistrict 宜阳街道
- subdistrict
- Location within Hunan
- Coordinates: 26°27′26″N 112°23′59″E
- Country: People's Republic of China
- Province: Hunan
- Prefecture: Hengyang
- County-level city: Changning
- Divisions: 4 communities and 47 villages

Area
  - Total: 104.71 km^{2} (40.43 sq mi)

Population (2010 census)
  - Total: 79,786
  - Density: 761.97/km^{2} (1,973.5/sq mi)
- Time zone: UTC+8 (China Standard)
- Area code: 0734
- Languages: Standard and Gan Chinese

Yiyang Subdistrict (simplified Chinese: 宜阳街道; traditional Chinese: 宜陽街道; pinyin: Yíyáng Jiēdào) is a subdistrict and the seat of Changning City in Hunan, China. It was one of 4 subdistricts approved to establish in 2008. The subdistrict has an area of 104.71 km^{2} (40.43 sq mi) with a population of 89,500 (as of 2015). The subdistrict of Yiyang has 47 villages and 4 communities under its jurisdiction, and its seat is at Huangqiao Village (黄桥村).

== History ==
The subdistrict of Yiyang was approved to form from 5 villages of Wanshou (万寿), Songtang (嵩塘), Songlian (嵩联), Shizhou (石洲) and Donghu (东湖), 4 communities of Chengdong (城东), Chengbei (城北), Qunying (群英) and Qingyi (青宜) of the former Yiyang Town (宜阳镇) in 2008, it was officially established in November 2008. On November 9, 2015, the township of Yitan (宜潭乡) was merged to the subdistrict.

== Subdivisions ==
In 2015, Yiyang Township and the former Yiyang Subdistrict were merged to establish Yiyang Subdistrict. The newly established Yiyang Subdistrict has 47 villages and 4 communities.

47 villages

- Bajiaotang Village (八角亭村)
- Caotang Village (曹塘村)
- Caotong Tongcun (曹同村)
- Changtong Village (长塘村)
- Chayuan Village (茶园村)
- Chuanshan Village (船山村)
- Cuijiayu Village (崔家堰村)
- Daqiao Village (大桥村)
- Dawu Tsuen (大屋村)
- Dayan Village (大堰村)
- Donghu Village (东湖村)
- Dongjia Jiacun (董家村)
- Fengping Village (枫坪村)
- Fushou Village (福寿村)
- Heping Village (和平村)
- Huangqiao Village (黄桥村)
- Huijiang Village (回江村)
- Huzhou Village (虎洲村)
- Jiangshui Village (江水村)
- Jintang Village (金塘村)
- Lianping Village (联坪村)
- Liufu Village (六福村)
- Meitang Village (梅塘村)
- Mengshan Village (盟山村)
- Nanjing Village (南京村)
- Qunying Village (群英村)
- Shaling Village (砂岭村)
- Shangdong Village (上洞村)
- Shangyi Village (上义村)
- Shiqiao Village (石桥村)
- Shizhou Village (石洲村)
- Shuquan Village (书泉村)
- Songlian Village (嵩联村)
- Songtong Village (嵩塘村)
- Tongwan Village (塘湾村)
- Wanshou Village (万寿村)
- Wulian Village (乌联村)
- Xingziping Village (星子坪村)
- Xinhe Village (新和村)
- Xinhua Village (新华村)
- Xinjian Village (新建村)
- Xinlian Village (新联村)
- Yelan Village (邺兰村)
- Youshi Village (由市村)
- Zhongyi Village (中义村)
- Zhutang Village (珠塘村)
- Ziyang Village (紫阳村)

4 communities

- Chengdong Community (城东社区)
- Chengbei Community (城北社区)
- Qunying Community (群英社区)
- Changyi Community (嵩宜社区)
