= Lei River =

Tributary of Xiang River in Hunan, China

Coordinates: 26°55′38″N 112°38′22″E

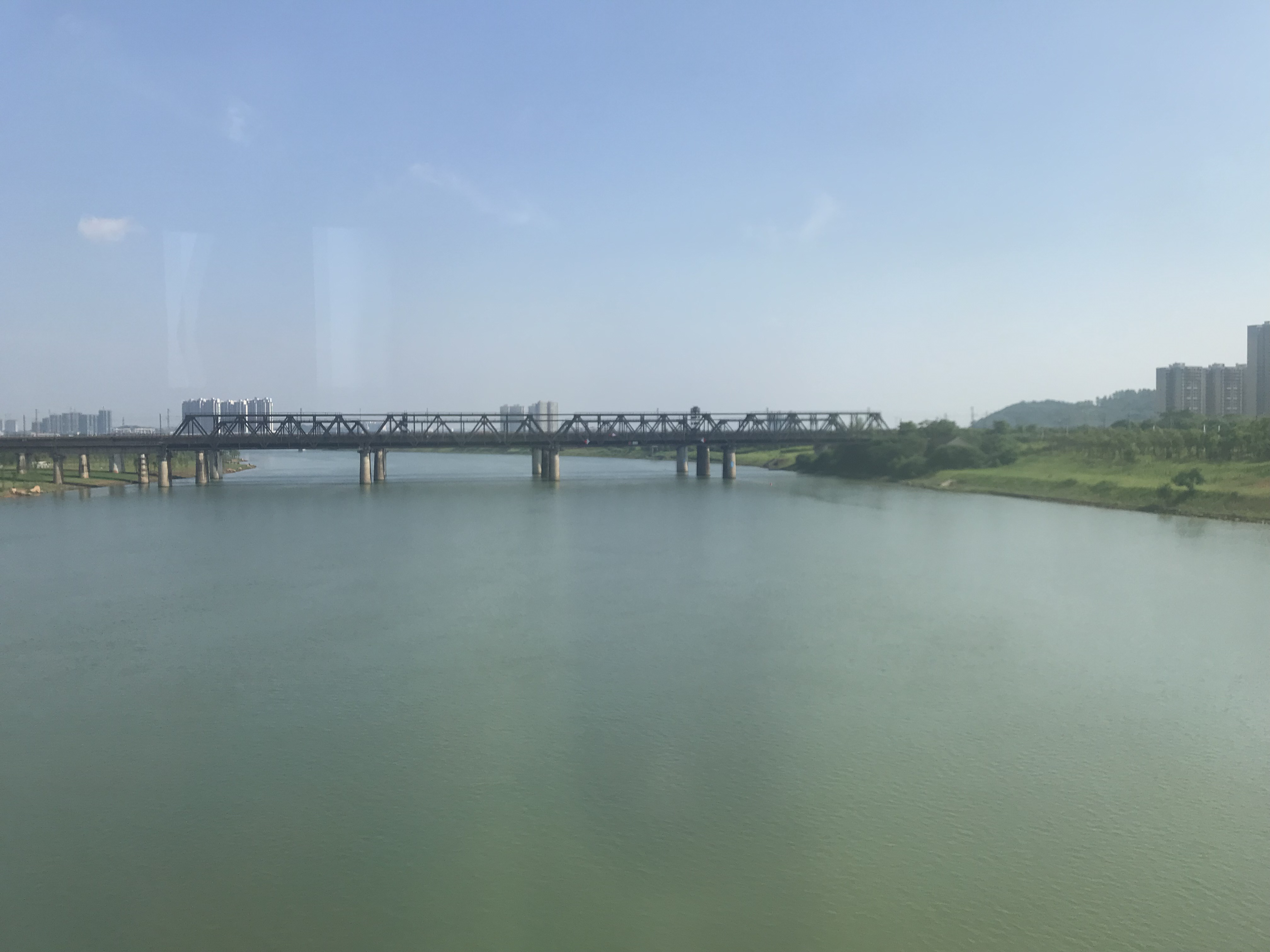
Beijing–Guangzhou Railway Lei River Bridge in Hengyang

The Lei River (Chinese: 耒水) is a right-bank tributary of the middle Xiang River in Hunan, China. It is also the longest tributary and has the second largest drainage system of the Xiang tributaries after the Xiao River. The Lei River has two sources: the Zhejiang River (Chinese: 浙江河), which rises in the Leishan Mountains (Chinese: 耒山) in the south of Rucheng County, and the Ou River (Chinese: 沤江), which rises in the Wanyang Mountains (Chinese: 万洋山) in the north of Guidong County. The two rivers join at Huangcaoping (Chinese: 黄草坪), Zixing City. The main stream of the Lei River runs generally south to northwest through Rucheng, Zixing, Suxian, Yongxing, Leiyang, Hengnan and Zhuhui counties and joins the Xiang at Leihekou (Chinese: 耒河口) of Zhuhui District of Hengyang. The main stream of the Lei River has a length of 521 kilometres (324 mi), with its tributaries, and the drainage basin covers an area of 11,873 square kilometres (4,584 sq mi).
