= Luhong River =

River in Hunan, China

Coordinates: 26°30′39″N 111°38′29″E

The Luhong River (Chinese: 芦洪江), also known as Ying River (Chinese: 应水), is a left-bank tributary of the upper Xiang River in Yongzhou Prefecture, Hunan Province, China. Luhong River rises in Lishuichong (Chinese: 栗木冲) of Dasheng Town (Chinese: 大盛镇) in the east of the Huanghua Mountains (Chinese: 黄花山), Dong'an County. The main stream of the Luhong River runs generally northwest to southeast, and it joins the Xiang at Shuijiangkou (Chinese: 水江口) of Gaoxishi Town (Chinese: 高溪市镇), Lengshuitan. The main stream of the Luhong River has a length of about 80 kilometres (50 mi), with its tributaries; the drainage basin covers an area of 1,076 square kilometres (415 sq mi).
