= Caizichi =

Caizichi 蔡子池
- subdistrict
- Location within Hunan
- Coordinates: 26°24′17″N 112°51′26″E
- Country: People's Republic of China
- Province: Hunan
- Prefecture: Hengyang
- County: Leiyang City
- Divisions: 10 communities

Area
  - Total: 52 km^{2} (20 sq mi)

Population (2010 census)
  - Total: 181,173
  - Density: 3,500/km^{2} (9,000/sq mi)
- Time zone: UTC+8 (China Standard)
- Area code: 0734
- Languages: Standard and Gan Chinese

Caizichi Subdistrict (Chinese: 蔡子池街道; pinyin: Càizǐchí Jiēdào) is a subdistrict and the seat of Leiyang City in the province of Hunan, China. The subdistrict has an area of 52 km^{2} (20 sq mi) with a population of 181,173 (as of 2010 census). It has 10 communities under its jurisdiction.

== History ==
The subdistrict of Caizichi is the ancient county seat of Leiyang County. There have been many historical events in the subdistrict. In 208 AD (Three Kingdoms period), Pang Tong was appointed as the county magistrate (Chinese: 县令) of Leiyang.

In 770 AD (Tang Dynasty period), to escape the scourge of war, Du Fu went to Chenzhou from Changsha, when traveling to Leiyang, he encountered flood. After staying for several days, Du Fu died of illness and was buried in 1 kilometer north of county seat (Du Fu's tomb is located in the present First Middle School of Leiyang).

In 1516, Gong Fuquan (Chinese: 龚福全), the head of the Chengui Peasants' Revolt (Chinese: 郴桂农民起义) captured the county seat.

On August 14, 1843, the Supervisor Yang Dapeng (Chinese: 监生阳大鹏) organized about four to five hundred peasants to enter the county seat and ordered the county magistrate Li Jinzhi (Chinese: 知县李金芝) to post a notice for reduction of money and grain tax. In April of the following year, because of the unbearable tax burden, he led more than one thousand of peasants to siege the county seat, After several failed attempts, he was seized and more than 200 peasants were killed by the end of June.

In early May 1918, the two troops of Cheng Qian Department (南军程潜部) of the South Army (National Revolutionary Army) and Wu Peifu Department (北军吴佩孚部) of the North Army (Beiyang Government) met in Leiyang. On June 6, the South Army captured the county seat of Leiyang. On June 15, the two sides negotiated an armistice. The North Army established the county office in the county seat and the county office of North Army is located in Shangbao Street (上堡街), the county was divided to govern by the two troops.

In 1942, 24 Japanese invading planes throwed 44 bombs three times, in this bombing, 128 people died and 244 were injured, 627 rooms and 1 car were destroyed.

== Geography ==
Caizichi is one of six urban subdistricts and the core urban area located in the central part of the city.

== Subdivision ==
The subdistrict of Caizichi has 10 communities under its jurisdiction.

10 communities

- Hualong Community (化龙社区)
- Jinnan Community (金南社区)
- Jinpen Community (金盆社区)
- Meiqiao Community (梅桥社区)
- Nanfang Community (南方社区)
- Nanzheng Community (南正社区)
- Niezhou Community (聂洲社区)
- Pailou Community (牌楼社区)
- Xiguan Community (西关社区)
- Xihu Community (西湖社区)

== Notable people ==
- Cai Lun (蔡伦; CE 48– 121), the inventor of Papermaking technology, one of the Four Great Inventions.
- Xie Hanwen (谢翰文; 1904 – 1942). One of the founders and leaders of the PLA and the Jinggangshan Revolutionary Base; one of Eighth Route Army senior generals and anti-Japanese generals; one of first famous anti-Japanese heroes of China; Served as Secretary-General of the Red Five Army, Secretary-General of 3rd Corps of Red Army, and Director of the Political Department of the General Logistics Department of the Eighth Route Army.
- Wu Yunpu (伍云甫; 1904 – 1969). He participated in the Autumn Harvest Uprising, Xiangnan Uprising and Long March. He served as director of the Xi'an Office of Eighth Route Army (八路军驻西安办事处), Secretary General of Central Military Commission, Secretary General of CPC Central Committee Working Committee; Secretary General of Chinese People's Relief Society, Vice President and Party Secretary of Chinese Red Cross Society, Deputy Minister of Ministry of Health.
- Wu Shaozu (伍绍祖; 1939 – 2012), Major general of PLA, the former Director General of State General Administration of Sports, chairman of Chinese Olympic Committee and International Wushu Federation.
