= Juan River =

Coordinates: 27°47′30″N 112°54′16″E

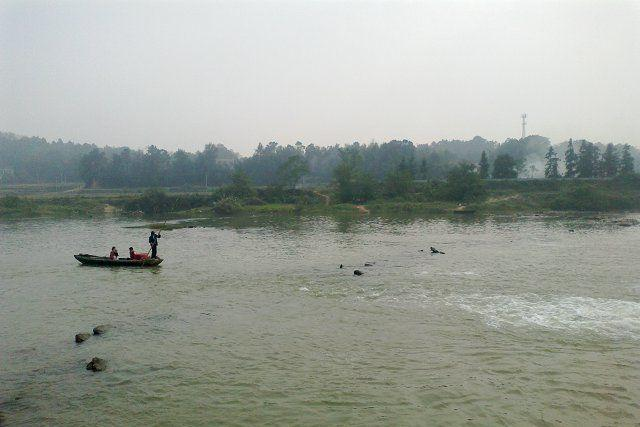

Physical characteristics
- Source: Changshan Mountains
- Length: 103 kilometres (64 mi)
- Basin size: 1,764 square kilometres (681 sq mi)

The Juan River (Chinese: 涓水), also known as Baiguo River (Chinese: 白果河), Yisu River (Chinese: 易俗河) and Xingle River (Chinese: 兴乐江), is a left-bank tributary in the middle reaches of the Xiang River in Hunan, China.

The river rises in the Changshan Mountains (Chinese: 昌山) of Shuangfeng County, and its main stream runs generally southwest to northeast through Shuangfeng, Hengshan and Xiangtan counties, joining the Xiang at Yisuhe of Xiangtan. The Juan River has a length of 103 kilometres (64 mi), and its drainage basin covers an area of 1,764 square kilometres (681 sq mi).
