= Guiyang County =

Guiyang County 桂阳县 Kweiyang
- County
- Location in Hunan
- Coordinates: 25°45′18″N 112°44′02″E
- Country: People's Republic of China
- Province: Hunan
- Prefecture-level city: Chenzhou
- Time zone: UTC+8 (China Standard)
- Postal code: 4244XX
- Division code: GYX

Guiyang County (simplified Chinese: 桂阳县; traditional Chinese: 桂陽縣; pinyin: Guìyáng Xiàn) is a county in Hunan Province, China. It is under the administration of Chenzhou prefecture-level city.

Located on the southern part of the province, it is adjacent to the east of the city proper in Chenzhou. The county is bordered to the north by Changning and Leiyang Cities, to the west by Xintian and Jiahe Counties, to the south by Linwu County, and to the east by Suxian and Beihu Districts. Guiyang County covers an area of 2,958.3 km^{2} (1,142.2 sq mi), and as of 2015, It had a registered population of 904,400 and a resident population of 711,700. The county has 17 towns, three subdistricts and two townships under its jurisdiction, with the county seat at Longtan Subdistrict (龙潭街道).

== Administrative divisions ==
3 subdistricts

- Huangshaping (黄沙坪街道)
- Longtan (龙潭街道)
- Lufeng (鹿峰街道)

17 towns

- Aoquan (敖泉镇)
- Chonglingjiang (舂陵江镇)
- Fangyuan (方元镇)
- Haotang (浩塘镇)
- Heping (和平镇)
- Heye (荷叶镇)
- Leiping (雷坪镇)
- Liantang (莲塘镇)
- Liufeng (流峰镇)
- Ouyanghai (欧阳海镇)
- Renyi (仁义镇)
- Sili (四里镇)
- Taihe (太和镇)
- Tangshi (塘市镇)
- Yangshi (洋市镇)
- Zhangshi (樟市镇)
- Zhenghe (正和镇)

1 townships

- Qiaoshi (桥市乡)

1 ethnic township

- Yao Baishui (白水瑶族乡)

== Climate ==
Climate data for Guiyang, elevation 329 m (1,079 ft), (1991–2020 normals, extremes 1981–2010)
Month	Jan	Feb	Mar	Apr	May	Jun	Jul	Aug	Sep	Oct	Nov	Dec	Year
Record high °C (°F)	25.5 (77.9)	31.1 (88.0)	32.4 (90.3)	34.1 (93.4)	34.9 (94.8)	37.0 (98.6)	39.2 (102.6)	38.9 (102.0)	37.6 (99.7)	34.9 (94.8)	32.9 (91.2)	25.7 (78.3)	39.2 (102.6)
Mean daily maximum °C (°F)	9.3 (48.7)	12.5 (54.5)	16.4 (61.5)	22.9 (73.2)	27.1 (80.8)	30.2 (86.4)	33.1 (91.6)	32.1 (89.8)	28.4 (83.1)	23.5 (74.3)	18.2 (64.8)	12.1 (53.8)	22.2 (71.9)
Daily mean °C (°F)	5.9 (42.6)	8.6 (47.5)	12.4 (54.3)	18.5 (65.3)	22.8 (73.0)	26.1 (79.0)	28.6 (83.5)	27.5 (81.5)	24.1 (75.4)	19.1 (66.4)	13.8 (56.8)	8.1 (46.6)	18.0 (64.3)
Mean daily minimum °C (°F)	3.6 (38.5)	6.0 (42.8)	9.6 (49.3)	15.3 (59.5)	19.6 (67.3)	23.2 (73.8)	25.3 (77.5)	24.4 (75.9)	21.1 (70.0)	16.0 (60.8)	10.5 (50.9)	5.3 (41.5)	15.0 (59.0)
Record low °C (°F)	−5.0 (23.0)	−4.2 (24.4)	−1.9 (28.6)	2.5 (36.5)	9.0 (48.2)	12.3 (54.1)	16.5 (61.7)	17.1 (62.8)	12.0 (53.6)	3.0 (37.4)	−2.6 (27.3)	−7.2 (19.0)	−7.2 (19.0)
Average precipitation mm (inches)	80.8 (3.18)	94.7 (3.73)	166.9 (6.57)	177.0 (6.97)	186.2 (7.33)	213.8 (8.42)	131.7 (5.19)	174.2 (6.86)	69.6 (2.74)	69.8 (2.75)	79.6 (3.13)	59.7 (2.35)	1,504 (59.22)
Average precipitation days (≥ 0.1 mm)	15.5	15.0	19.3	16.9	17.5	16.9	11.6	14.2	11.2	10.6	11.3	12.1	172.1
Average snowy days	2.8	1.5	0.2	0	0	0	0	0	0	0	0	0.8	5.3
Average relative humidity (%)	82	82	83	79	79	78	70	75	77	76	77	76	78
Mean monthly sunshine hours	67.6	71.6	80.4	113.4	139.9	156.1	238.2	195.3	142.7	132.3	119.4	102.9	1,559.8
Percentage possible sunshine	29	20	22	22	29	34	38	57	49	39	37	37	32
Source: China Meteorological Administration

== Notable people ==
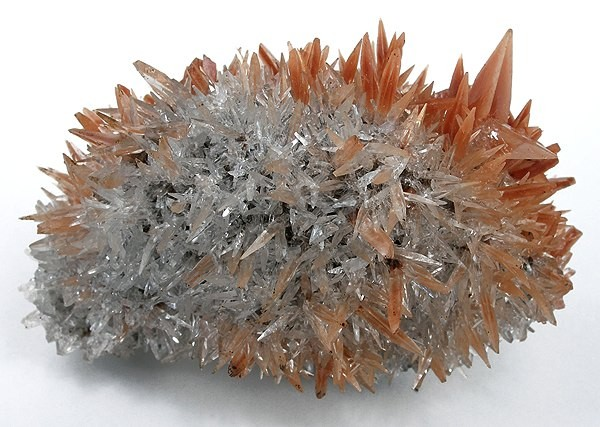
Calcite crystals, Leiping, Guiyang County, from a find in 2000.

- Liu Fangwu (1898–1994), a Nationalist (KMT) general, a graduate of Whampoa Military Academy, best known for his leadership in the Battle of Yenangyaung.
