= Changning, Hunan =

Changning 常宁市
- County-level city
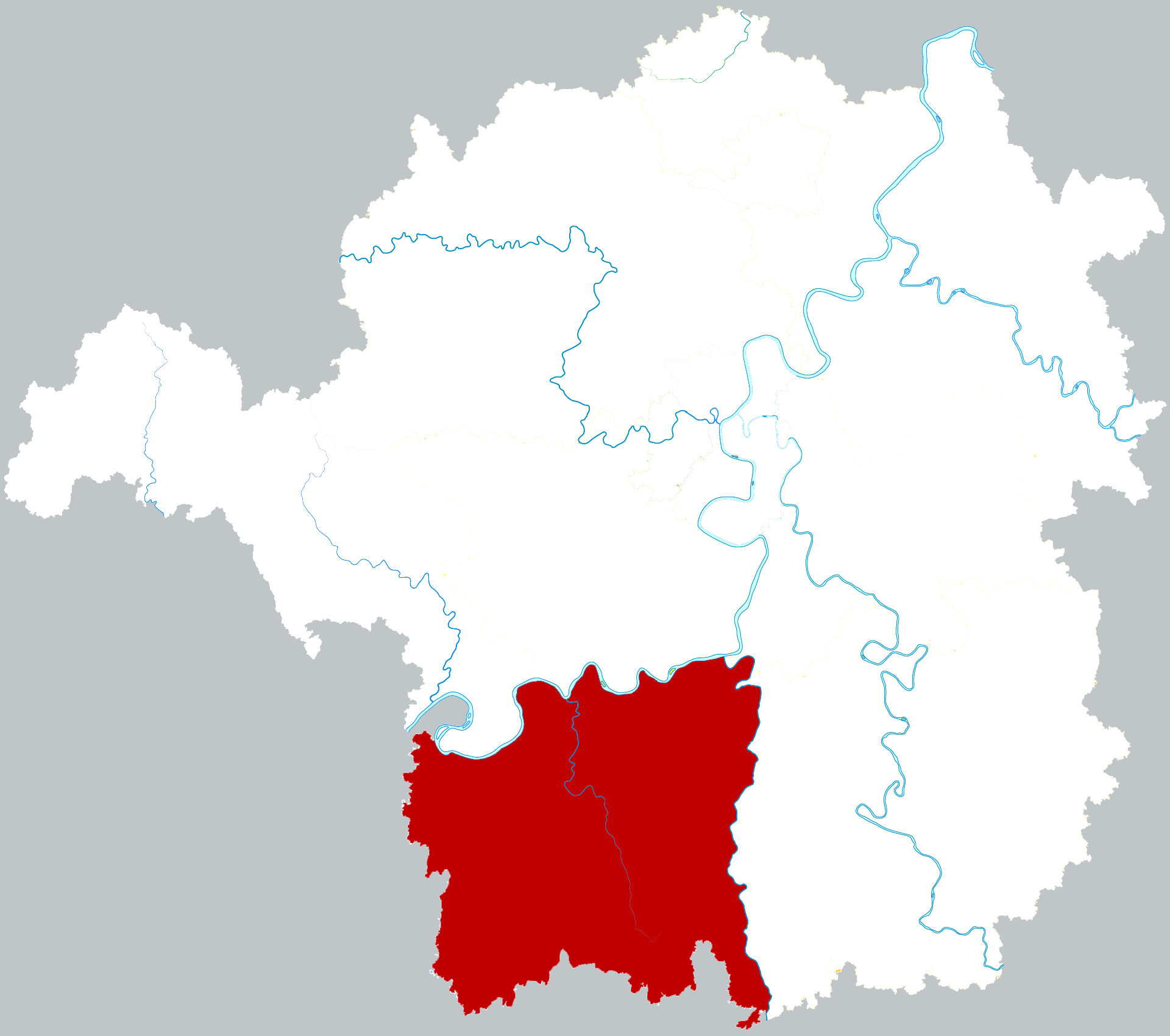
- Location in Hengyang

- Location in Hunan
- Coordinates: 26°25′20″N 112°24′00″E
- Country: People's Republic of China
- Province: Hunan
- Prefecture-level city: Hengyang
- Divisions: 4 townships, 14 towns and 3 subdistricts
- Establishment: 257 AD
- government seat: Yiyang Subdistrict

Area
  - County-level city: 2,046.6 km^{2} (790.2 sq mi)
  - Land: 1,959.8 km^{2} (756.7 sq mi)
  - Water: 86.8 km^{2} (33.5 sq mi)
  - Urban: 38.40 km^{2} (14.83 sq mi)

Population (2010 census)
  - County-level city: 810,447
  - Estimate (2017): 990,000
  - Density: 413.54/km^{2} (1,071.1/sq mi)
  - Urban: 240,000
- Time zone: UTC+8 (China Standard)
- Postal code: 4215xx
- Area code: 0734
- Languages: Mandarin and Gan Chinese
- Website: hnchangning.gov.cn

Changning (Note: Chinese: 常宁; pinyin: Chángníng;) is a county-level city in Hunan Province, China, under the administration of Hengyang prefecture-level City. Located on the south-central part of the province, the city is bordered to the north by Qidong and Hengnan Counties, to the east by Leiyang City, to the south by Guiyang County, and to the west by Qiyang County. Changning City covers 2,046.6 km^{2} (790.2 sq mi) with a registered population of 958,988 and resident population of 810,447 (as of the 2010 census). The city has three subdistricts, 14 towns and four townships under its jurisdiction. The government seat is Yiyang Subdistrict (宜阳街道).

== History ==
Before the Zhou dynasty, Changning was part of Jingzhou. It was part of Chu State during the Warring States period, and it was the territory of Leiyang County during the Qin and Han dynasties. In the three kingdoms period, the two counties of Xinping (新平县) and Xinning (新宁县) were formed from the western side of Chongling River in the southwest of Leiyang County In 257 AD. In Jin dynasty period, the county of Xinping was merged to Xinning in 396 AD. In Tang dynasty period, the county of Xinning was renamed to Changning (the present name) in 742 AD. It was a county of Heng Precture (衡州) during the periods of Tang dynasty, five Dynasties and Song dynasty.

The county of Changning was ceased to be as a separated county, it was approved to reorganize as a county-level city of Hengyang by the State Council on November 26, 1996.

== Geography ==
Changning City is located in the south of Hunan province, the southwest of Hengyang and on the south bank of the middle reaches of Xiang River. it is bordered Leiyang City across the Chongling River to the east, Guiyang County to the south, Qiyang County to the west, counties of Qiyang and Hengnan across the Xiang River to the north. It is located between latitude 26°07'-26°36' degrees N and between longitude 112°07'-112°41'E. The city of Changing has an area of 2,046.6 square kilometers, accounting for 0.97% of Hunan and 13.37% of Hengyang.

Changning has an area of 2046.6 square kilometers, including 520 square kilometers of plains, accounting for 25.41% of the total area; hills of 348 square kilometers, accounting for 17.01%; water area of 86.8 square kilometers, accounting for 4.24%. According to the natural attributes of land, 37,910 hectares of arable land, 18.52% of the total area; 91,950 hectares of forest land, accounting for 44.1%; garden area of 4,180 hectares, accounting for 2.06%.

The city's geological stratigraphy is complex, ranging from the Cambrian of the Paleozoic to the Quaternary of the Cenozoic, with the exception of the Tertiary of the Cenozoic. The rocks are dominated by sedimentary rocks, accounting for about 80% of the total. Exposed in different geological periods from the Paleozoic to the Cenozoic, the distribution of igneous rocks is relatively small. There are dozens of rock bodies exposed, covering an area of about 428 square kilometers, mainly granite, accompanied by moderately acidic granodiorite and a small amount of basic lamprophyre, basaltic rock and so on.

=== Topography ===
The topography of Changning is low in the south and high in the north, it is roughly a two-step staircase. Tashan Mountain (塔山) and Dayi Mountain (大义山) in the south of the city are clusters of Nanling Mountains, and the two mountains are in the north-east and north–south directions respectively. Between the two mountains is the Mianqian - Xihu Low Flat Valley (庙前-西湖低平谷地), which is the traffic channel between Changning and Guiyang. There are 16 peaks above 1000 meters above sea level and 63 between 1000 meters to 100 meters above sea level. These mountains form the natural barrier in the south and are the first step. The terrain in the north is undulating with the plains and hills staggered. Most of them are below 200 meters above sea level, it is the second step. The territory of Changning is divided into three types of terrain: mountainous area, hilly area and plain. The area of mountains, hilly area and plain respectively account for 37.6%, 26% and 37.4% of the total area of the city.

=== Hydrology ===
The water system of Changning City is complete and the river network is dense. The river runoff is mainly supplied by rainwater. The rainfall in the flood season is more concentrated and that in the non-flood season is less, the water flow in the wet and dry seasons is very different, the annual water level changes greatly. Usually the high water level appears in April–July, and the low water level appears from October to February. The level of the main stream of the Xiang River varies by 11.00-15.51 meters with an average flow of 1370 cubic meters per second, a maximum flow of 18,100 cubic meters per second, a minimum flow of 30 cubic meters per second, and an average annual flow of 48.74 billion cubic meters for many years. The trend is the same as the precipitation distribution, and the runoff is mostly concentrated in the spring and summer. The runoff from April to July accounts for more than 60% of the annual runoff. The average sediment concentration for many years is 0.1--0.5 kg/m^{3}, the amount is lower than the tributaries. The natural water quality from the Xiang section and its tributaries such as rivers of Yi, Tan, Wu and Chongling, etc. is good, and the PH value is mostly around 7.2.

=== Climate ===
In general, Changning has a humid subtropical monsoon climate with four distinct seasons. Due to the influence of the large-scale climate in the region and the complex topography of the territory, annual meteorological elements such as precipitation, air temperature and sunshine are erratic.

Climate data for Changning, elevation 117 m (384 ft), (1991–2020 normals, extremes 1981–2010)
Month	Jan	Feb	Mar	Apr	May	Jun	Jul	Aug	Sep	Oct	Nov	Dec	Year
Record high °C (°F)	27.4 (81.3)	33.3 (91.9)	36.9 (98.4)	36.7 (98.1)	37.0 (98.6)	38.1 (100.6)	40.3 (104.5)	40.8 (105.4)	38.2 (100.8)	37.7 (99.9)	34.6 (94.3)	25.8 (78.4)	40.8 (105.4)
Mean daily maximum °C (°F)	9.5 (49.1)	12.5 (54.5)	16.7 (62.1)	23.4 (74.1)	27.8 (82.0)	30.9 (87.6)	34.3 (93.7)	33.4 (92.1)	29.4 (84.9)	24.2 (75.6)	18.5 (65.3)	12.4 (54.3)	22.8 (72.9)
Daily mean °C (°F)	6.3 (43.3)	8.8 (47.8)	12.6 (54.7)	18.8 (65.8)	23.3 (73.9)	26.7 (80.1)	29.7 (85.5)	28.6 (83.5)	24.8 (76.6)	19.6 (67.3)	14.0 (57.2)	8.4 (47.1)	18.5 (65.2)
Mean daily minimum °C (°F)	4.0 (39.2)	6.2 (43.2)	9.8 (49.6)	15.4 (59.7)	19.9 (67.8)	23.6 (74.5)	26.1 (79.0)	25.2 (77.4)	21.5 (70.7)	16.3 (61.3)	10.8 (51.4)	5.6 (42.1)	15.4 (59.7)
Record low °C (°F)	−4.1 (24.6)	−7.4 (18.7)	−0.5 (31.1)	2.7 (36.9)	9.1 (48.4)	13.7 (56.7)	18.4 (65.1)	18.3 (64.9)	12.8 (55.0)	4.3 (39.7)	−1 (30)	−6.3 (20.7)	−7.4 (18.7)
Average precipitation mm (inches)	84.4 (3.32)	93.2 (3.67)	163.6 (6.44)	156.1 (6.15)	182.8 (7.20)	203.5 (8.01)	134.9 (5.31)	131.5 (5.18)	71.2 (2.80)	74.8 (2.94)	84.9 (3.34)	60.5 (2.38)	1,441.4 (56.74)
Average precipitation days (≥ 0.1 mm)	15.6	15.3	19.0	16.7	16.7	14.9	10.5	12.0	10.4	10.5	12.1	11.7	165.4
Average snowy days	3.2	1.6	0.3	0	0	0	0	0	0	0	0	0.7	5.8
Average relative humidity (%)	81	81	82	79	78	79	70	74	76	76	77	76	77
Mean monthly sunshine hours	52.4	56.9	65.7	95.4	120.5	125.9	218.5	181.8	136.4	120.8	105.7	89.4	1,369.4
Percentage possible sunshine	16	18	18	25	29	31	52	45	37	34	33	28	31
Source: China Meteorological Administration

=== Administrative division ===
3 subdistricts

- Peiyuan (培元街道)
- Quanfeng (泉峰街道)
- Yiyang (宜阳街道)

14 towns

- Baisha (白沙镇)
- Banqiao (板桥镇)
- Bofang (柏坊镇)
- Guanling (官岭镇)
- Luoqiao (罗桥镇)
- Miaoqian (庙前镇)
- Sanjiaotang (三角塘镇)
- Shengqiao (胜桥镇)
- Shuikoushan (水口山镇)
- Xiling (西岭镇)
- Xinhe (新河镇)
- Yangquan (洋泉镇)
- Yanzhou (烟洲镇)
- Yintian (荫田镇)

4 townships

- Dabao (大堡乡)
- Lanjiang (兰江乡)
- Pengtang (蓬塘乡)
- Tashan (塔山瑶族乡)

== Economy ==
According to preliminary accounting of the statistical authority, the gross domestic product of Changning City in 2017 was 33,096 million yuan (4,897 million US dollars), up by 8.7 percent over the previous year. Of this total, the value added of the primary industry was 5,322 million yuan (787 million US dollars), up by 3.4 percent, that of the secondary industry was 12,259 million yuan (1,814 million US dollars), up by 7.9 percent and that of the tertiary industry was 15,515 million yuan (2,296 million US dollars), up by 11.5 percent. The value added of the primary industry accounted for 16.08 percent of the GDP; that of the secondary industry accounted for 37.04 percent; and that of the tertiary industry accounted for 46.88 percent. The per capita GDP in 2017 was 39,995 yuan (5,917 US dollars).

== Culture ==
Like the neighbouring city of Leiyang, Changning's dialect belongs to the Gan Chinese family and is distinct from the Hengyang dialect of Xiang Chinese.
