= Xidu, Hunan =

Xidu 西渡镇
- Town
- Location within Hunan
- Coordinates: 26°58′22″N 112°21′46″E
- Country: People's Republic of China
- Province: Hunan
- Prefecture: Hengyang
- County: Hengyang County
- Administrative centre: Huaihua Community
- Divisions: 22 villages and 13 communities

Area
  - Total: 152.6 km^{2} (58.9 sq mi)

Population (2010)
  - Total: 170,351
  - Density: 1,116/km^{2} (2,891/sq mi)
- Time zone: UTC+8 (China Standard)
- Area code: 0734
- Languages: Standard Chinese, Hengzhou Hunanese
- Website: http://xz.hyxnews.com/XD/

Xidu Town (Chinese: 西渡镇; pinyin: Xīdù Zhèn) is a town and the seat of Hengyang County in Hunan, China. The town has an area of 152.6 km^{2} (58.9 sq mi) with a population of about 170,351 (as of 2010 census). It has 22 villages and 13 communities under its jurisdiction, and its seat is Huaihua Community (槐花社区).

== History ==
The name of Xidu Town may have been first recorded in Yuanfeng Jiuyu Zhi (元丰九域志; a geographical book by Wang Cun) in the Northern Song dynasty. It means crossing the river to the west. Going west to Baoqing (modern Shaoyang) from Hengzhou (modern Hengyang) via the Zheng River in the past, it was named after that. It is Located on the western bank of Zheng River. After Hengnan County was reformed from a part of the county of Hengyang, its seat was moved to the town from the north of Hengyang (the modern Shigu District) in July 1952.

== Subdivision ==
The town of Xidu had 61 villages and 9 communities at its establishment in 2015. Its divisions were reduced to 35 from 70 through the amalgamation of villages in 2016. It has 22 villages and 13 communities under its jurisdiction.

22 villages

- Bao'an Village (保安村)
- Chishui Village (赤水村)
- Doupo Village (豆陂村)
- Duling Village (陡岭村)
- Fuxing Village (福星村)
- Huanglin Village (黄林村)
- Meihua Village (梅花村)
- Meizhu Village (梅竹村)
- Panlong Village (盘龙村)
- Qingjiang Village (清江村)
- Qingli Village (青里村)
- Qingping Village (清平村)
- Qiutang Village (秋塘村)
- Tianxing Village (天星村)
- Tongqiao Village (桐桥村)
- Xianshui Village (咸水村)
- Xianzhongwu Village (咸中吾村)
- Xiaohai Village (小海村)
- Xidu Village (西渡村)
- Xinqiao Village (新桥村)
- Yingnan Village (英南村)
- Zhenxing Village (振兴村)

13 communities

- Bao'an community (保安社区)
- Binjiang Community (滨江社区)
- Chunfeng community (春风社区)
- Haotang Community (壕塘社区)
- Huaihua Community (槐花社区)
- Jiangkou Community (江口社区)
- Jiangshan Community (江山社区)
- Minghan Community (明翰社区)
- Mizi Community (米子社区)
- Sanlian Community (三联社区)
- Yanggu Community (阳古社区)
- Yingpo Community (英陂社区)
- Zhenyang Community (蒸阳社区)
