= Zhengxiang =

Zhengxiang can refer to:

- Zhengxiang, Hengyang (Chinese: 蒸湘区), a district of the city of Hengyang, Henan province, China

- Zhengxiang Subdistrict, seat of the district

- Lu Zhengxiang (Chinese: 陸徵祥), Chinese diplomat, priest, and politician
- Chen Zhengxiang (Chinese: 陈正祥), Republic of China geographer
- Zhang Zhengxiang (Chinese: 章证翔), Malaysian actor
