= Yunji, Hunan =

Yunji 云集镇
- town
- Location within Hunan
- Coordinates: 26°43′50″N 112°40′25″E
- Country: People's Republic of China
- Province: Hunan
- Prefecture: Hengyang
- County: Hengnan County
- Administrative centre: Huangjin Community
- Divisions: 37 villages and 19 communities

Area
  - Total: 296.7 km^{2} (114.6 sq mi)

Population (2015)
  - Total: 155,100
  - Density: 522.8/km^{2} (1,354/sq mi)
- Time zone: UTC+8 (China Standard)
- Area code: 0734
- Languages: Standard Chinese and Hengzhou dialect

Yunji Town (simplified Chinese: 云集镇; traditional Chinese: 雲集鎮; pinyin: Yúnjí Zhèn) is a town and the seat of Hengnan County in Hunan, China. The town has an area of 296.7 km^{2} (114.6 sq mi) with a household population of 155,100 (as of 2015). The town of Yunji has 37 villages and 19 communities under its jurisdiction, and its seat is Huangjin Community (黄金社区).

== History ==
The town of Yunji was reformed through the merger of three towns of the former Yunji, Chejiang and Xiangyang on November 18, 2015.

=== The former Yunji Town ===
The former Yunji Town was formed on June 9, 1996, it is the central north of the present Yunji Town. The county seat of Hengnan was transferred to the town from Zhongshan North Road in Shigu District (石鼓区中山北路) on January 19, 2004. The former Yunji had an area of 101.8 km^{2} (39.3 sq mi) with a population of 50,649 (as of 2010 census), it was divided into 12 villages of Dukou (渡口村), Gutang (古塘村), Heshi (河市村), Huilong (回龙村), Jiangxin (江新村), Liping (栗坪村), Maotang (毛塘村), Puxian (普贤村), Shitang (石塘村), Xiangguling (响鼓岭村), Yangjiaping (阳家坪村) and Yangliu (杨柳村), and 11 communities of Baohe (保合社区), Binhe (滨河社区), Dongwu (东屋社区), Duiziling (堆子岭社区), Huangjin (黄金社区), Quanzi (泉梓社区), Shanfeng (杉峰社区), Xincheng (新城社区), Xinqiao (新桥社区), Xintangzhan (新塘站社区) and Yunji (云集社区).

=== Chejiang Town ===
Chejiang Town (Chinese: 车江镇) was formed in 1951, it is the western part of the present Yunji Town. The town had an area of 112 km^{2} (43 sq mi) with a population of 35,530 (as of 2010 census), it was divided into 24 villages of Baishui (白水村), Changhe (长合村), Chejiang (车江村), Fengfu (丰富村), Gaotian (高田村), Gucheng (古城村), Hengxing (恒星村), Huaqiao (花桥村), Jinma (金马村), Jinxing (金星村), Leizufeng (雷祖峰村), Shalong (沙龙村), Shanglong (上龙村), Shengli (胜利村), Shenlong (神龙村), Shuanglong (双龙村), Tieshi (铁市村), Weiyi (唯一村), Xiashan (霞山村), Xinfa (新发村), Xuanpo (宣陂村), Youyi (友谊村), Zhangshu (樟树村) and Zhenxing (振兴村), and 6 communities of Daqiao (大桥社区), Dashanping (大山坪社区), Fuquan (福泉社区), Pailou (牌楼社区), Tieguanpu (铁关铺社区) and Youyi (友谊社区).

=== Xiangyang Town ===
Xiangyang Town (Chinese: 向阳镇) was formed from a part of Xiangyang Commune in 1981 and reformed in 1993, it is the southeast of the present Yunji Town. The town had an area of 128.4 km^{2} (49.6 sq mi) with a population of 45,752 (as of 2010 census), it was divided into 27 villages of Anfu (安福村), Chaoyang (朝阳村), Chehe Caichang (车荷菜场村), Dongqing (洞清村), Gaoling (高岭村), Heping (和平村), Huangshi (黄狮村), Jiepai (界牌村), Jintai (金台村), Liangshi (良石村), Lianhua (莲花村), Liantang (连塘村), Lingjue (灵觉村), Pengci (彭祠村), Risheng (日升村), Shuikou (水口村), Suhu (苏湖村), Tianzhu (天竹村), Tuanjie (团结村), Xiangjiang (湘江村), Xiangyang (向阳村), Yantou (堰头村), Yatian (雅田村), Yushi (渔市村), Zhuchong (祝冲村), Zhushan (祝山村) and Zifu (资富村), 5 communities of Huangshitang (黄狮塘社区), Jiangtang (疆塘社区), Jiedao (街道社区), Shuikou (水口社区) and Xiangyang (向阳社区).

== Subdivisions ==
The town of Yunji had 75 villages and 17 communities in 2015. Through the merger of village-level divisions in 2016, its divisions was reduced to 56 from 92. The town has 19 communities and 37 villages under its jurisdiction.

37 villages

- Baishui Village (白水村)
- Baiyang Village (白洋村)
- Changhe Village (长合村)
- Chaoyang Village (朝阳村)
- Dexing Village (德星村)
- Dukou Village (渡口村)
- Fugao Village (富高村)
- Fusheng Village (富升村)
- Gaoxuan Village (高宣村)
- Gutang Village (古塘村)
- Hengxing Village (恒星村)
- Heshi Village (河市村)
- Huangshi Village (黄狮村)
- Huaqiao Village (花桥村)
- Huilong Village (回龙村)
- Jiangxin Village (江新村)
- Jinpan Village (金盘村)
- Jinsheng Village (金升村)
- Liang'an Village (良安村)
- Lingjue Village (灵觉村)
- Liping Village (栗坪村)
- Longshan Village (龙山村)
- Maotang Village (毛塘村)
- Puxian Village (普贤村)
- Qingzhu Village (清竹村)
- Shengli Village (胜利村)
- Shenlong Village (神龙村)
- Shiniufeng Village (十牛峰村)
- Shitang Village (石塘村)
- Tianzhu Village (天竹村)
- Tieshi Village (铁市村)
- Tugutang Village (土谷塘村)
- Xiangguling Village (响鼓岭村)
- Xinlian Village (新联村)
- Yangjiaping Village (阳家坪村)
- Yangliu Village (杨柳村)
- Yuxiang Village (渔湘村)

19 communities

- Baohe Community (保合社区)
- Binhe community (滨河社区)
- Daqiao Community (大桥社区)
- Dongwu Community (东屋社区)
- Duiziling Community (堆子岭社区)
- Fuquan Community (福泉社区)
- Huangjin Community (黄金社区)
- Jiangtang Community (疆塘社区)
- Jiedao community (街道社区)
- Quanyu Community (泉梓社区)
- Shanfeng Community (杉峰社区)
- Shuikou Community (水口社区)
- Tieguanpu Community (铁关铺社区)
- Xiangyang Community (向阳社区)
- Xincheng Community (新城社区)
- Xinqiao Community (新桥社区)
- Xintang Station Community (新塘站社区)
- Youyi community (友谊社区)
- Yunji Community (云集社区)
