= Hengyang Library =

Chinese public library

Coordinates: 26.8890°N 112.6096°E

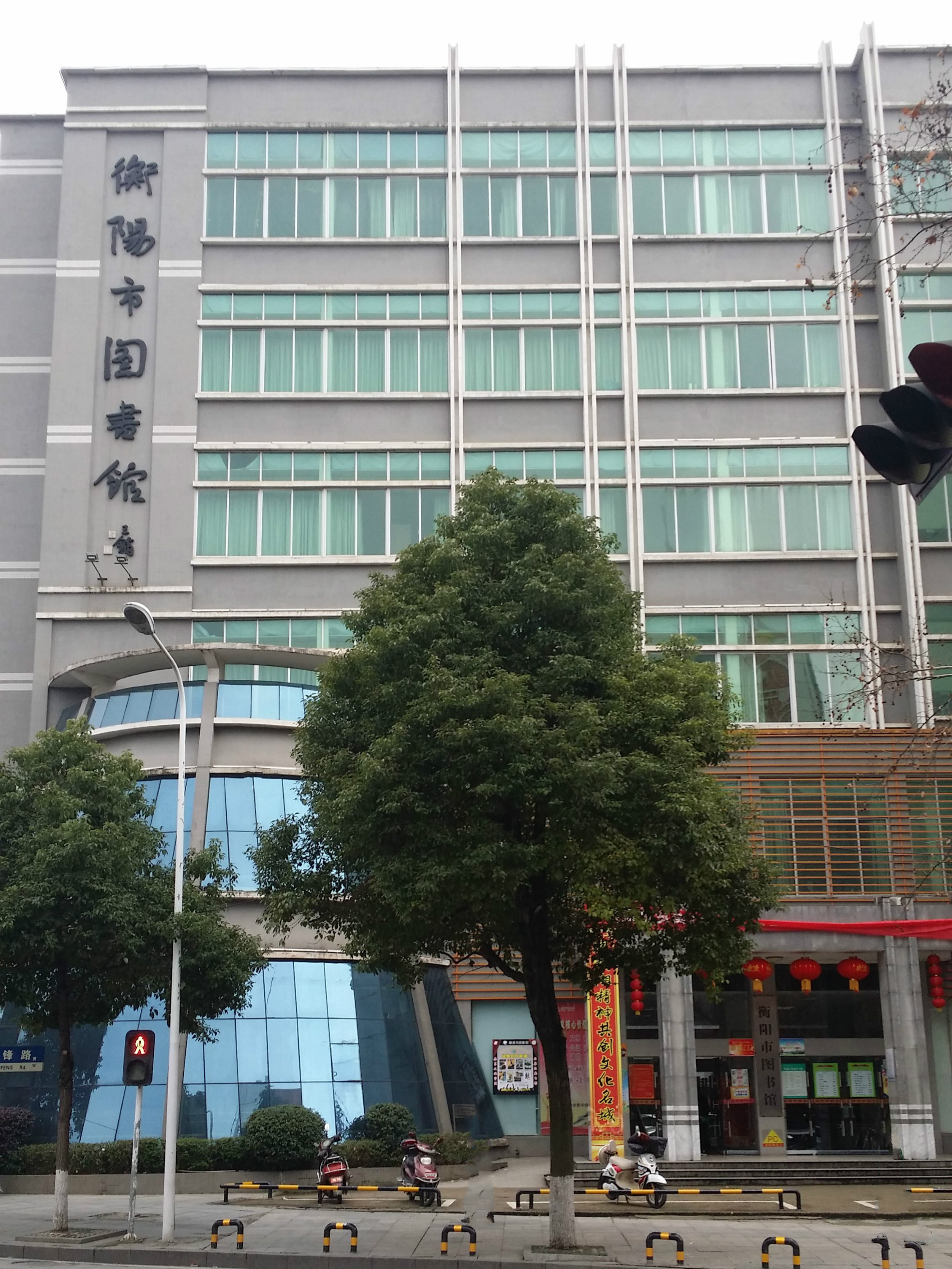
- Location: No. 49, Xianfeng Road, Yanfeng district, Hengyang, Hunan, China (old building); Northeast side of the intersection of Zhengyang South Road and Hengzhou Avenue, Yanfeng district, Hengyang, Hunan, China (new building), China
- Type: Public library
- Established: 1921

Collection
- Size: More than 560,000

Other information
- Budget: 1.8 million RMB
- Director: Liu Zhongping
- Employees: 54 (2006)
- Website: www.hengyanglib.org

Hengyang Library or Hengyang City Library (in Chinese: 衡阳市图书馆) is a National First-Class Library located in the prefecture of Hengyang, province of Hunan of the People's Republic of China.

== History ==
=== Republic of China ===
Hengyang City Library has been known by various names, such as Hengyang County Public Library, Provincial Hengyang Library, and Hengyang City Chuanshan Library.

In 1917, preparations began for the establishment of Hengyang County Public Library, and in the autumn of 1919, the site of the Model Primary School of Hengyang Prefecture was converted into a library building.

In 1921, Hengyang County Public Library opened for service. In 1930, academics in Hengyang County began to expand the library. By 1932, a new 1,100 square meter library building was completed on the left side of the Hengyang County Office.

In 1944, during the fall of Hengyang, the original library was bombed and relocated to Banqiao, Hengyang County. On April 23, 1946, the library reopened at the private Taoshu Primary School.

=== After the Liberation ===
In October 1949, the Hengyang Municipal People's Government took over Hengyang City Library and the Hengyang People's Education Hall, establishing the Hengyang People's Cultural Palace. The library was located in the municipal committee compound on Xuegong Road, and during this time, the library became known as the "Hengyang City Cultural Palace Reading Room." In 1954, Hengyang City Library resumed its official library status and received a large collection of books from Nanyue Zhongzheng Library. On February 19, 1955, Hengyang City Library was renamed "Hengyang City Chuanshan Library," and in April it opened to the public at Yueping Park.

In 1962, the "Chuanshan Memorial Hall" was established within the Hengyang City Chuanshan Library. After the start of the Cultural Revolution, the memorial hall was dismantled, and the "Chuanshan" part of the library’s name was also prohibited, changing back to "Hengyang City Library."

In the winter of 1969, Hengyang City Library was merged with the Hengyang City Cultural Center and the Hengyang City Workers’ Cultural Palace to form the "Hengyang City Mass Cultural Center," and the library ceased public services.

In October 1971, Hengyang City Library regained its status as an independent institution. In 1975, the library moved to its current location in the municipal committee compound on Xianfeng Road.

On January 1, 2022, the new Hengyang City Library opened for trial operation.

=== Current status ===
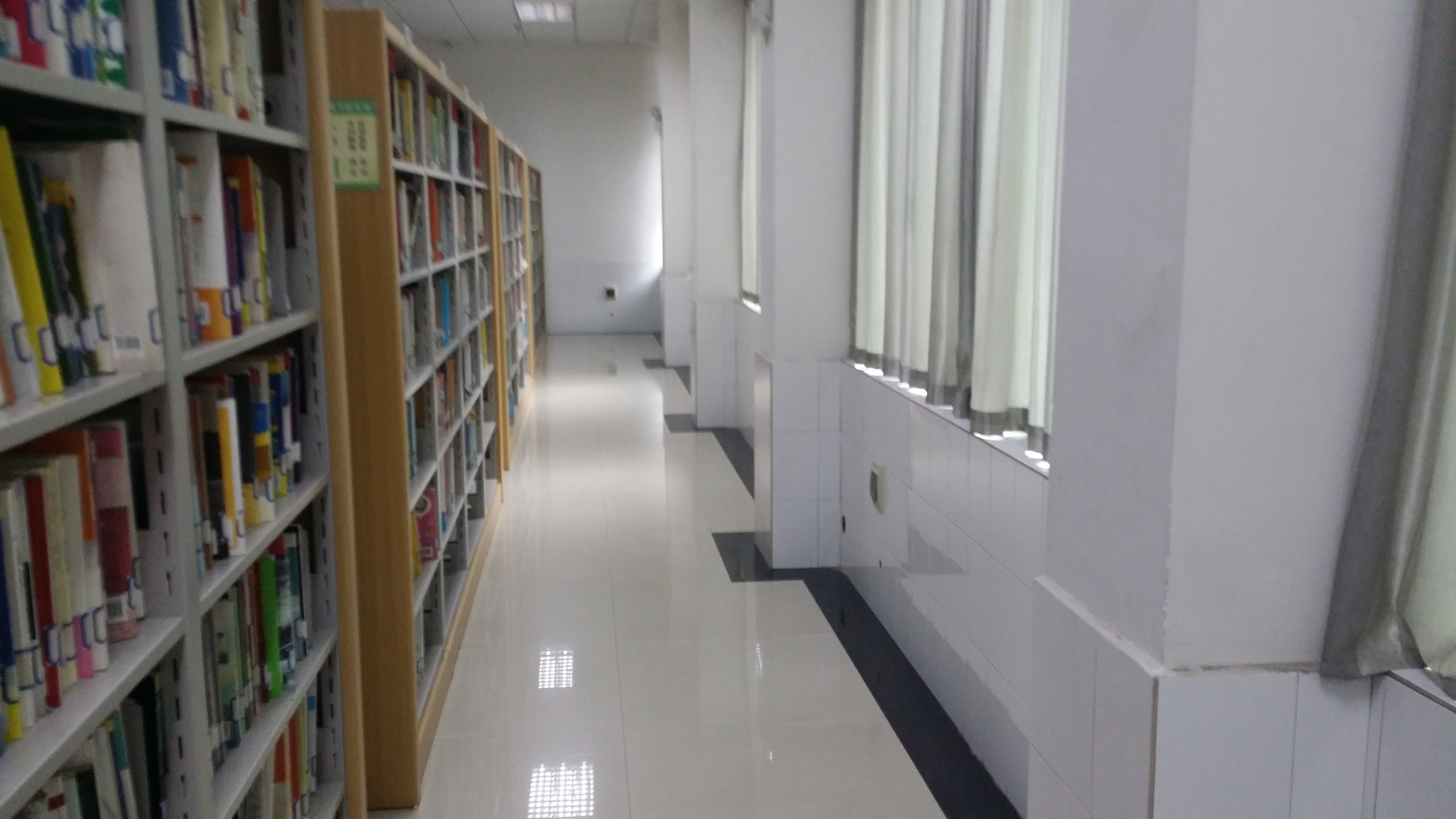
Reading room of the second floor.

In September 2011, Hengyang City Library implemented free public access.

=== Infrastructure ===
Hengyang City Library has six floors.

Floor	Area
1st	Reading room for current journals, reading room for past issues
2nd	Loan section for Chinese books
3rd	Multimedia room
4th	Reading room for local documents, exhibition room
5th	Self-study room, room for library science materials, reference consultation room
6th	Multifunctional auditorium, conference room

=== Venue construction ===
In 1985, the reading building of Hengyang Library was completed, bringing the library’s total area to nearly 10,000 square meters. In 2001, the Hengyang Municipal Government built Zhengyang Road, which passed directly through the library’s courtyard, resulting in 2/5 of the original library area being demolished, reducing the building area to less than 7,000 square meters. The Hengyang Children’s Library, which had shared the same courtyard, had its office building entirely demolished and had to move to the former offices of the Hengyang Cultural Bureau. In addition to the space reduction caused by the Zhengxiang Road project, the library also faced challenges such as disrepair and aging electrical systems, which affected its normal operations.

In 2009, with financial support from the Hengyang Municipal Government, the library began a comprehensive renovation. The library resumed normal services in July 2010. In 2014, the construction project of the new Hengyang Library and Yanfeng Park officially began. The new library is being built on the south side of Yanfeng Park, with a total construction area of approximately 21,000 square meters. The main building consists of three floors above ground and one underground level.

== Collection ==
As of 2013, Hengyang Library’s total collection amounted to more than 560,000 volumes. According to the library's official website in 2013, the collection includes over 38,000 ancient books and books from the Republic of China era, along with nearly 20,000 local documents, including works by famous people from Hengyang. According to a 2015 report in Hunan Daily: “The library of the Hunan Academy of Social Sciences has 120,000 volumes, while the Songpo Library in Shaoyang and Hengyang Library each hold approximately 50,000 ancient books.”

=== Ancient books and local documents ===
The ancient books in Hengyang Library’s collection partly came from the transfer of Nanyue Zhongzheng Library in 1954, partly from rescue efforts during the Cultural Revolution's “Four Olds” movement, and partly from social donations. Library staff also actively seek out and purchase ancient books and local documents.

In 2013, Hengyang Library's collection of Zhu Yi, compiled by Jiang Xuqing during the Ming Dynasty, a woodblock print from the 44th year of the Wanli reign (1616), was selected for the fourth batch of the National Rare Ancient Books Catalogue, numbered 00674.

=== Ancient books rescued ===
With the onset of the Cultural Revolution in 1966, numerous private and institutional collections of books in Hengyang were sent to scrap yards as part of the movement to "Destroy the Four Olds." A library employee, Huang Yaowu, took the opportunity while searching for artifacts from the Xiangnan Student Union to collect a large number of ancient books from scrap yards and the Hengyang Paper Mill. In March 1967, Huang Yaowu recovered a Kangxi Hunan edition of Jin Ping Mei (金瓶梅) from the Qing Dynasty and an official Ming Dynasty edition of Shu Chuan Hui Xuan (书传会选). In 1968, he bought nearly 3,000 ancient books from Changning Second Middle School, several of which were later included in the General Catalogue of Chinese Rare Books.

== Cultural activities ==
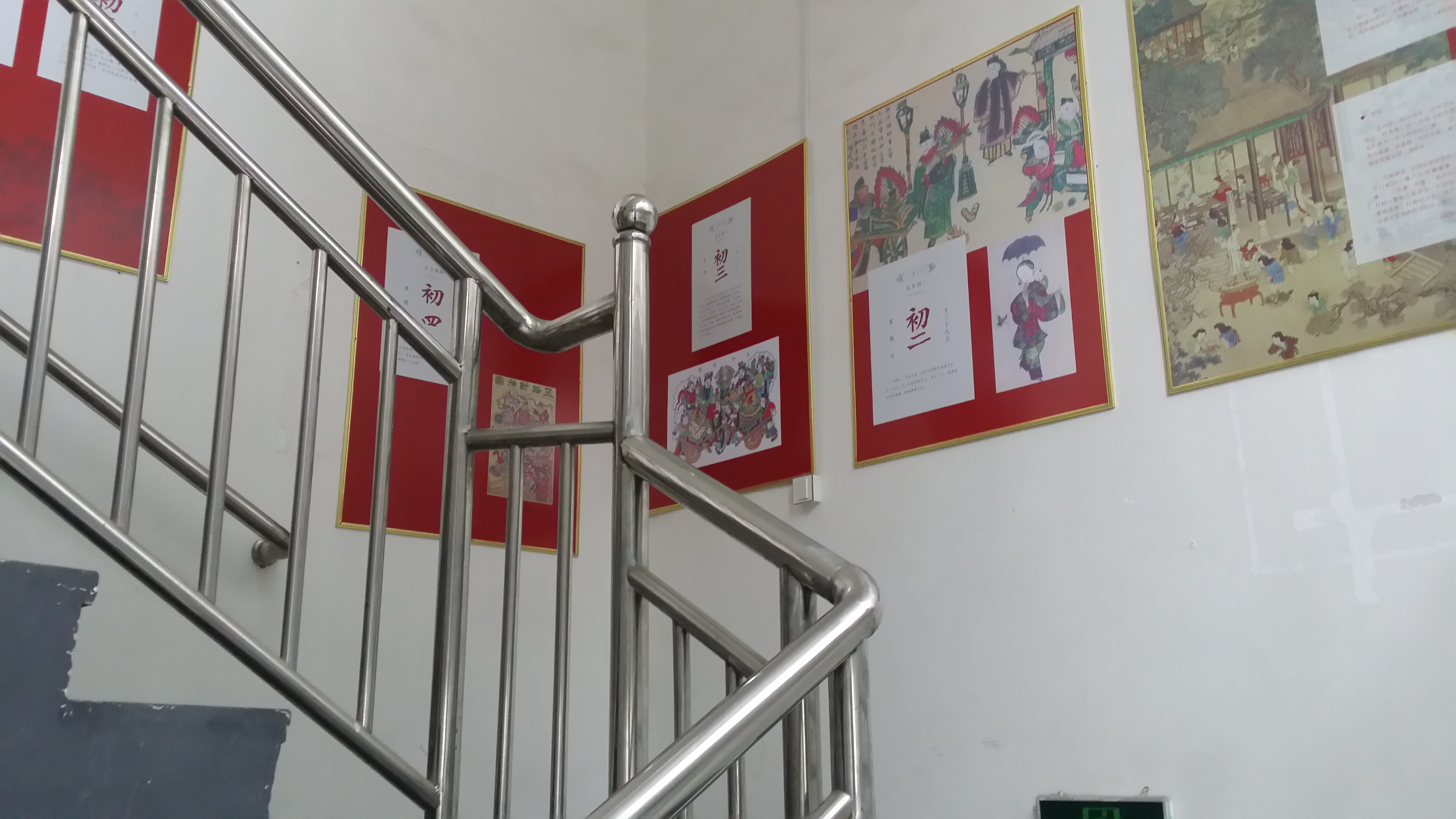
During the Spring Festival, Hengyang Library posted educational materials about the Spring Festival on the staircase.

=== Festive activities ===
During the Spring Festival, Hengyang Library holds a free reading event called "Library Welcoming Spring." During the Lantern Festival, it hosts a lantern riddle competition open to all citizens.

=== Charity activities ===
On May 29, 2016, Hengyang Library held a themed book circulation event called "Books Flowing Beyond Yanmenguan, Literature Reaching the Clouds." Volunteer teams from Nanhua University and Hengyang raised books for rural students at the Second Complete High School in Shidian County, Yunnan Province. Hengyang Library also donated books to students in Yunnan.

=== Yannan Prison Library mobile station ===
In Yannan Prison, there is a criminal named Zhou Jun, convicted of gang robbery and sentenced to life in prison. In 2001, he wrote letters seeking knowledge to over 100 libraries across the country. Half a month later, he began receiving responses and donations of more than 5,000 books from institutions like the People's Public Security University of China and Hunan Provincial Library.

After learning about this, Hengyang Library decided to set up a mobile book station at Yannan Prison. On April 17, then-library director Mao Lihua visited the prison and proposed the idea of a "mobile library station," which received support from the prison.

On the morning of May 17, despite the rain, library staff delivered books to Yannan Prison, which deeply moved Zhou Jun and other inmates.

=== Military mobile library ===
On August 8, 2014, Hengyang Library signed an agreement with a division of the Guangzhou Military Region stationed in Hengyang to jointly establish a "Military Mobile Library." Every quarter, the library selects 1,500 books, which are registered and distributed to various units after being processed by the Political Department of the military.

In 2016, the "Military Mobile Library" initiative won the First Prize for Outstanding Public Library Services from the Hunan Provincial Department of Culture.

=== Yancheng Citizens' Cinema ===
On March 12, 2016, Hengyang Library officially launched the "Yancheng Citizens' Cinema" project. Every Saturday morning, a classic film is shown in the library’s multimedia hall, and citizens can watch the film for free without needing a ticket.

=== Transfer of cultural relics ===
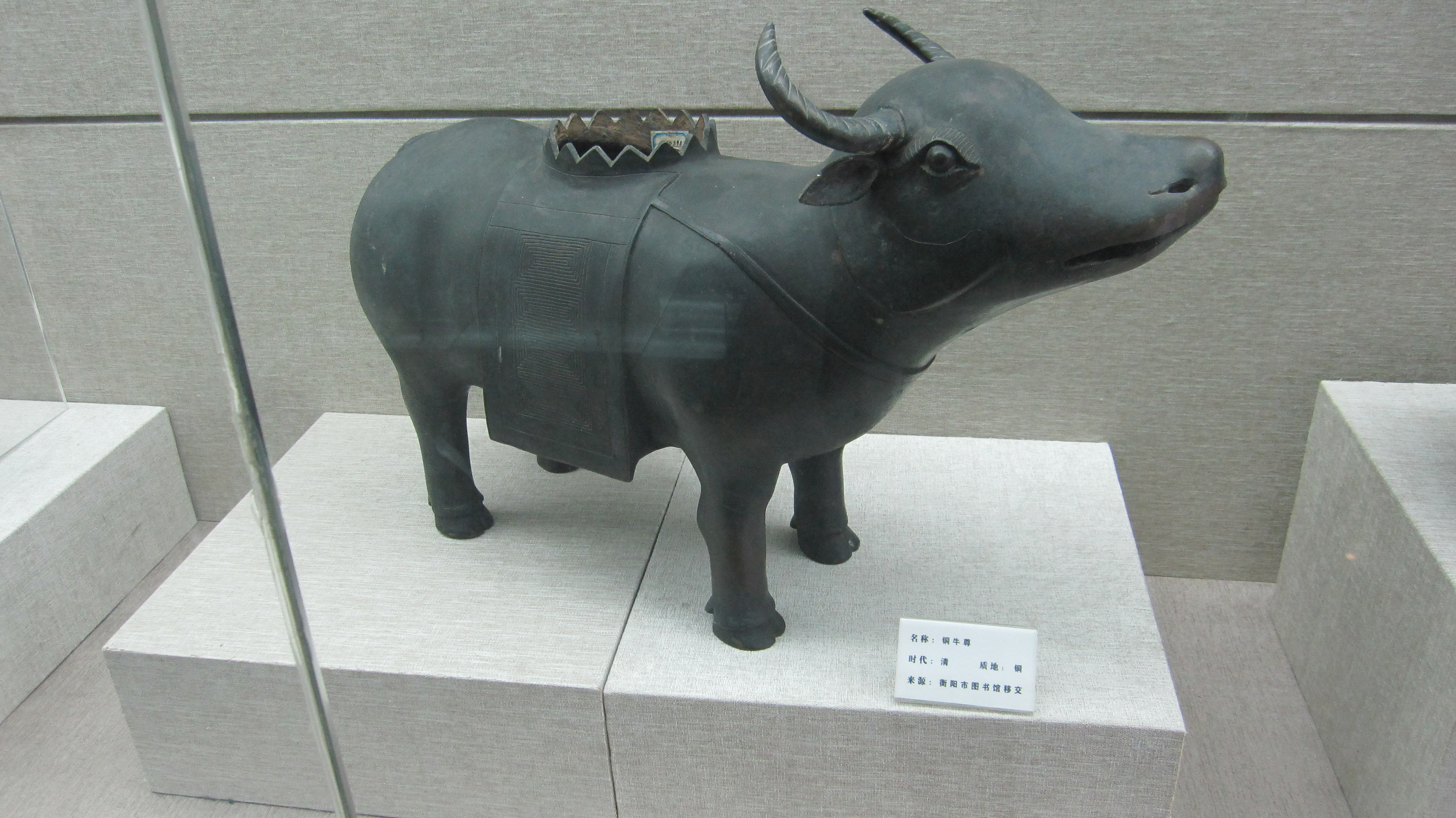
Qing Dynasty copper ox zun transferred by Hengyang Library to Hengyang Museum.

Hengyang Museum has a Qing Dynasty copper ox-shaped zun (ritual vessel), which was transferred by Hengyang Library.

=== Exchanges and exhibitions ===
On December 27, 2015, the "Library of a Thousand Flowers—Exhibition of Nationally Rare Ancient Books in Hunan Province" opened at Hunan Library. Hengyang Library, along with 16 other libraries, exhibited ancient books at the event.

== See also ==
- List of libraries in China
