= Xidu =

Xidu may refer to:

- Xidu laptop (喜度电脑), a young computer manufacturing company from Shenzhen, China
- Xidu station (西渡站), a station on Line 5 of the Shanghai Metro
- Xidu Subdistrict (西渡街道), Fengxian District, Shanghai
- Xidu, Hunan (西渡镇), town in and seat of Hengyang County
- Daxi Dam (大西坝), also known as "西渡堰", former dam along the Eastern Zhejiang Canal
- Fengxiang County, formerly named Xidu (西都) in the Tang Dynasty, Shaanxi
