= Jingtou =

Jingtou may refer to:

- Jingtou, Fogang County (迳头镇), town in Guangdong, China
- Jingtou, Hengyang (井头镇), a town of Hengyang County, Hunan.
