= Liushi, Hunan =

Liushi 硫市镇
- Town
- Location in Hunan
- Coordinates: 26°42′36″N 112°27′14″E
- Country: People's Republic of China
- Province: Hunan
- Prefecture-level city: Hengyang
- County: Hengnan County
- Time zone: UTC+8 (China Standard)

Liushi (Chinese: 硫市) is a town of Hengnan County, Hunan, China. As of 2018, it has two residential communities and 20 villages under its administration.
