= Huangshawan =

Huangshawan 黄沙湾街道
- Subdistrict
- Location within Hunan
- Coordinates: 26°55′10″N 112°36′05″E
- Country: People's Republic of China
- Province: Hunan
- Prefecture: Hengyang
- District: Shigu District
- Divisions: 7 communities and 2 villages

Area
  - Total: 33.05 km^{2} (12.76 sq mi)

Population (2015)
  - Total: 34,400
  - Density: 1,041/km^{2} (2,700/sq mi)
- Time zone: UTC+8 (China Standard)
- Area code: 0734
- Languages: Standard and Xiang Chinese

Huangshawan Subdistrict (simplified Chinese: 黄沙湾街道; traditional Chinese: 黃沙灣街道; pinyin: Huángshāwān Jiēdào) is a subdistrict and the seat of Shigu District in Hengyang, Hunan, China. The subdistrict has an area of about 33.05 km^{2} (12.76 sq mi) with a population of 34,400 (as of 2015). The subdistrict of Huangshawan has 2 villages and 7 communities under its jurisdiction.

== History ==
The subdistrict of Huangshawan was formed as a division of the former Suburb District (郊区) in July 1996. the Suburb District ceased to be a separated district, it was transferred to Shigu District in June 2001. The township of Songmu (松木乡) was merged to it on November 18, 2015. The subdistrict covers an area of 33.05 km^{2} (12.76 sq mi). Through the merger of village-level divisions in 2016, its division was reduced to 9 from 13.

== Subdivisions ==
The newly established subdistrict of Huangshawan administered 10 villages of Tuanjie, Jinbu, Chaoyang, Songmu, Youyi, Songmei, Qingshi, Zhangmu, Lingguanmiao and Jianxin, and Songmu Agricultural Science Center (松木农科站), 2 communities of Yanqihu and Xiashendu in 2015. Through the merger of village-level divisions in 2016, its divisions were reduced to 9 from 13. The subdistrict has 7 communities and 2 villages under its jurisdiction.

7 villages

- Chaoyang Village (朝阳村)
- Lingguanmiao Village (灵官庙村)
- Songmu Village (松木村)
- Jinbu Village (进步村)
- Qingshi Village (青石村)
- Songmei Village (松梅村)
- Tuanjie Village (团结村)

2 communities

- Xiashendu Community (辖神渡社区)
- Yanqihu Community (雁栖湖社区)
