= Yanfeng Subdistrict =

Yanfeng Subdistrict 雁峰街道
- subdistrict
- Location within Hunan
- Coordinates: 26°52′58″N 112°36′41″E
- Country: People's Republic of China
- Province: Hunan
- Prefecture: Hengyang
- District: Yanfeng District
- Divisions: 6 communities and a village

Area
  - Total: 5 km^{2} (1.9 sq mi)

Population (2010 census)
  - Total: 40,330
  - Density: 8,100/km^{2} (21,000/sq mi)
- Time zone: UTC+8 (China Standard)
- Area code: 0734
- Languages: Standard and Xiang Chinese

Yanfeng Subdistrict (Chinese: 雁峰街道; pinyin: Yànfēng Jiēdào) is a subdistrict and the seat of Yanfeng District in Hengyang, Hunan, China. The subdistrict has an area of about 5 km^{2} (1.9 sq mi) with a population of 40,330 (as of 2010 census). The subdistrict of Yanfeng has a village and six communities under its jurisdiction.

== History ==
The subdistrict of Yanfeng was established in May 1955 and was named after Huiyan Peak (回雁峰), the first peak of Mount Heng. In 1958, it was reorganized as Yanfeng Subdistrict Branch (雁峰街道分社) of the Yanfeng People's Commune (雁峰人民公社). In 1965, Damatou Subdistrict Branch (大码头街道分社) was incorporated to it. In May 1966, it was renamed to Hongwei Subdistrict Branch (红卫街道分社). In 1971, Hongwei Subdistrict (红卫街道) was established. In 1981, The subdistrict of Hongwei was restored to the name of Yanfeng.

== Subdivisions ==
In 2014, Yanfeng Subdistrict administered nine communities of Daweiping, Jielong, Yudetang, Yuhuating, Xiangyinling, Yanfenglu, Lijiachong, Xinjiacun and Dangjiacun, and Yuedong Village. Through the merger of village-level divisions in 2015, its division was reduced to seven from 10, it has six communities and a village under its jurisdiction.

6 communities

- Lijiachong Community (厉家冲社区)
- Xiangyinling Community (巷荫岭社区)
- Xinhuacun Community (杏花村社区)
- Yannangui Community (雁南归社区)
- Yudetang Community (余德塘社区)
- Yuhuating Community (雨花亭社区)

a village

- Yuedong Village (岳东村)
