= Zhangshu Township =

Zhangshu Township 樟树乡
- Township
- Location in Hunan
- Coordinates: 26°55′47″N 112°29′0″E
- Country: People's Republic of China
- Province: Hunan
- Prefecture-level city: Hengyang
- County: Hengyang County
- Time zone: UTC+8 (China Standard)

Zhangshu Township (simplified Chinese: 樟树乡; traditional Chinese: 樟樹鄉; pinyin: Zhāngshù Xiāng) is a township under the administration of Hengyang County, in central Hunan, China. As of 2018, it has one residential community and 5 villages under its administration.
