= Renmin Subdistrict, Hengyang =

Renmin Subdistrict 人民街道
- Subdistrict
- Location in Hunan
- Coordinates: 26.9008°N 112.6099°E
- Country: China
- Province: Hunan
- Prefecture-level city: Hengyang
- District: Shigu District
- Time zone: UTC+8 (China Standard Time)

Renmin Subdistrict (Chinese: 人民街道; pinyin: Rénmín Jiēdào) is a subdistrict situated in Shigu District, Hengyang, Hunan, China. As of 2020, it administers the following four residential neighborhoods:

- Renmin Road Community (人民路社区)
- Xiangbei Community (湘北社区)
- Xiangyang Community (向阳社区)
- Zhengyang Community (蒸阳社区)

== See also ==
- List of township-level divisions of Hunan
