= Chajiang =

Town in Hunan, China

Chajiang 渣江镇
- Town
- Location in Hunan
- Coordinates: 27.1770°N 112.4054°E
- Country: People's Republic of China
- Province: Hunan
- Prefecture-level city: Hengyang
- County: Hengyang County
- Time zone: UTC+8 (China Standard)

Chajiang or Zhajiang (渣江镇) is a town in Hengyang County, Hunan, China.
