= Ho Chen Tsu =

Taiwan architect

Ho Chen Tsu(賀陳詞) (1918-1994), born in Hengyang, Hunan Province, is one of the first generation of architects and important architecture educators in post-war Taiwan.

== Profile ==
Ho Chen Tsu is a native of Hengyang County, Hunan Province. He was enrolled into the Foreign Languages Department, Amoy University in 1940. He transferred to the Foreign Languages Department, Sun Yat-sen University in 1941 and transferred to the Architecture and Engineering Department in 1942. After graduating from the university, he worked in the Changsha Municipal Government, and later served as an engineering officer in the 10th Supply Brigade of the Air Force. He came to Taiwan with the Air Force in 1948. In 1955, he taught at Taiwan Provincial Institute of Technology (now National Cheng Kung University). In 1967, he had a study tour in the United Kingdom and the United States for nearly one year when he studied the history of modern European architecture and the education of university architecture departments in both countries. After retiring in 1979, he taught at Tunghai University. He died in 1994.

== Architectural style ==
Mr. Ho Chen received the architectural education of Beaux-Arts at Sun Yat-sen University in Guangzhou, and later he developed a keen interest in modernist architecture and formed his unique viewpoints. Beaux-Arts, Ludwig Mies van der Rohe and traditional Chinese architecture had significant influence on the style of his works, which have integrated the regional features of Taiwan. His eclectic architectural style is as simple and clear as modern architecture. Meanwhile, the solemnity and simplicity of traditional architecture have remained.

== Important architectural works ==
Changrong Road Evangelical Lutheran Church, Tainan (1955)

Memorial Gate of National Cheng Kung University (1956)

Tainan Baha'i Center (1957)

The Third Dining Hall of National Cheng Kung University (1958)

National Cheng Kung University Overseas Chinese Students' Dormitory (1958)

Pius Seminary in Tainan (1960)

Tainan Radio the Voice of Victory (1962)

Reconstruction of King of Yanping Memorial Temple, Tainan (1964)

King of Yanping Memorial Temple, Jheng Cheng-gong Memorial Hall, Tainan (1964)

Renovation of Chihkan Tower in Tainan (1965)

Catholic Bao Ren Elementary School and Kindergarten (1966)

Sightseeing Center of Zengwen Dam Administration (1975)

NCYU Teachers College Student Activity Center (1975)

National Sun Yat-sen University Campus Planning Project (1980)
