= Zhengxiang, Hengyang =

Zhengxiang 蒸湘区
- District
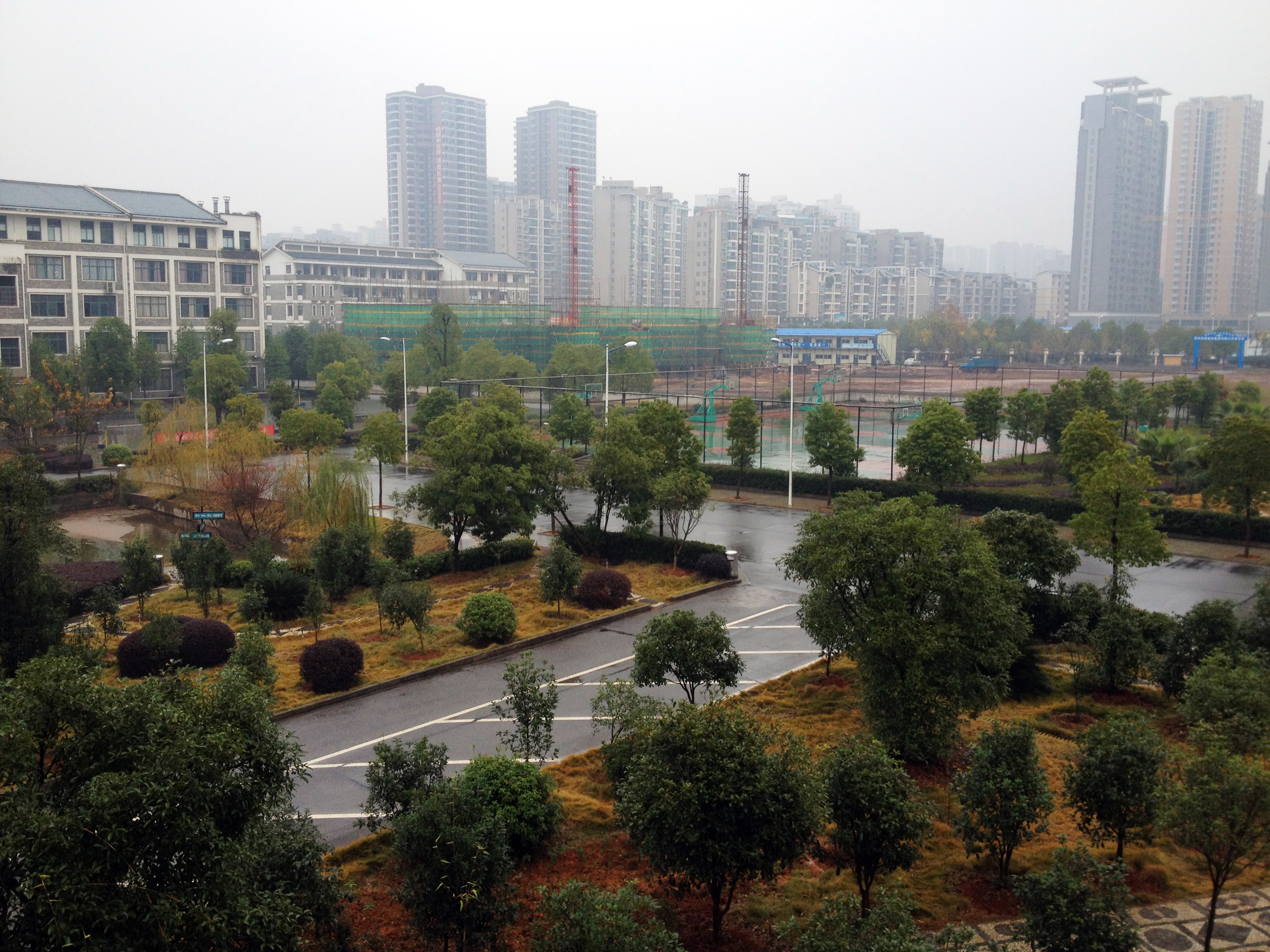

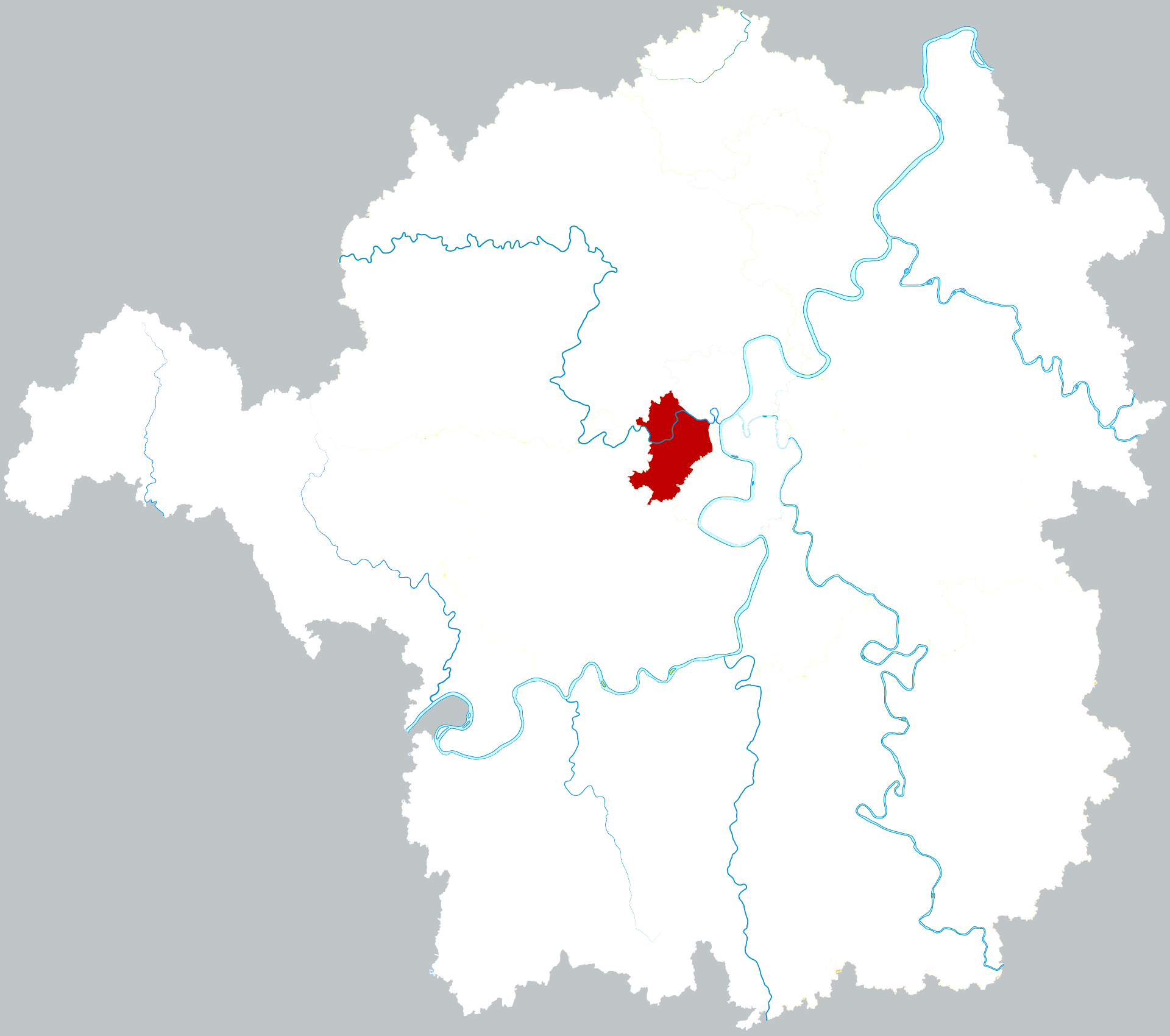
- Location in Hengyang

- Location in Hunan
- Coordinates: 26°54′45″N 112°34′03″E
- Country: People's Republic of China
- Province: Hunan
- Prefecture-level city: Hengyang
- Seat: Zhengxiang Subdistrict
- Time zone: UTC+8 (China Standard)

Zhengxiang District (simplified Chinese: 蒸湘区; traditional Chinese: 蒸湘區; pinyin: Zhēngxiāng Qū) is an urban district of Hengyang City, Hunan province, China. The district is located in the west of the city proper, Zheng River flows from the west to the east. It is bordered by Shigu District to the northeast, Yanfeng District to the southeast, Hengnan County to the south and the west, and Hengyang County to the north. Zhengxiang District covers an area of 108.44 km^{2} (41.87 sq mi), and as of 2015, it had a permanent resident population of 309,900 and a registered population of 258,900. The district has four subdistricts and two townships under its jurisdiction, and the government seat is at Zhengxiang Subdistrict (蒸湘街道).

== Administrative divisions ==
4 subdistricts

- Hongxiang (红湘街道)
- Huaxing (华兴街道)
- Lianhe (联合街道)
- Zhengxiang (蒸湘街道)

2 towns

- Aiyingling (呆鹰岭镇)
- Yumushan (雨母山镇)
