= Hengnan County =

Hengnan County 衡南县
- County
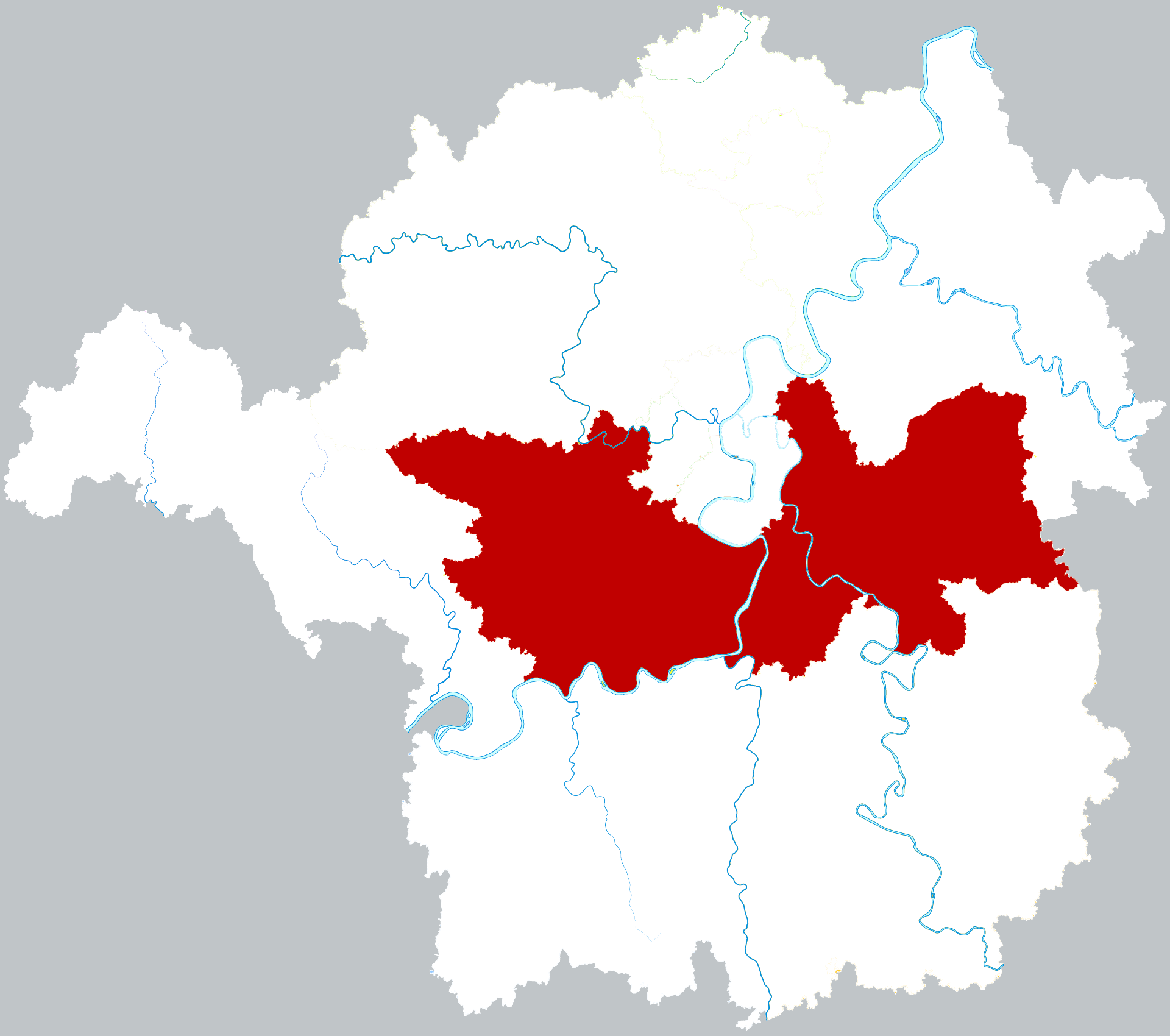
- Location in Hengyang

- Location in Hunan
- Coordinates: 26°44′25″N 112°40′39″E
- Country: People's Republic of China
- Province: Hunan
- Prefecture-level city: Hengyang
- Seat: Yunji
- Time zone: UTC+8 (China Standard)

Hengnan County (Chinese: 衡南县; pinyin: Héngnán Xiàn; lit. 'south of Mount Heng') is a county located in the south of Hengyang prefecture-level city, Hunan province, China. It was established in 1952 and named after the south of Mount Heng. The county has an area of 2,621.1 km^{2} (1,012.0 sq mi) with a population of 1,069,800 (as of 2015). The county of Hengnan has one township and 21 towns under its jurisdiction, and its seat is the town of Yunji (云集镇).

== History ==
The county of Hengnan was a part of Ling County (酃县) formed in 202 BC (Western Han period) and a part of Linzheng County (临蒸县), when Ling County was amalgamated to Linzheng County in 395 AD (Jin period), it became a part of Hengyang County formed through the amalgamation of the three counties of Linzheng (临蒸), Xincheng (新城) and Chong'an (重安) in 589 AD (Sui dynasty).

It was approximately the territory of Qingquan County (清泉县) established from the south eastern part of Hengyang County in 1755 and merged to the county in 1912. The county of Hengnan was reformed from the south eastern part of Hengyang County in 1952.

== Geography ==
The county of Hengnan is located in the central southeast of Hunan. It has borders with the cities of Leiyang and Changning to the south, Qidong County to the west, the two counties of Hengyang and Hengshan, three districts of Zhengxiang, Yanfeng and Zhuhui to the north, and two counties of Hengdong and Anren to the northeast and east. The county seat is Yunji Town.

The Xiang River flows from southwest to north throughout the county, its two major tributaries of Zheng and Lei rivers runs through most of the towns. The Ouyanghai Reservoir on the Chongling River irrigates thousands of hectares of arable land in the east. There are hundreds of rivulets, and three lakes of Longxiqiao, Shuangbanqiao and Doushanqiao.

As of 2013, the county had identified more than 30 metal and non-metallic minerals, mainly tungsten, copper-manganese, iron, uranium, aluminum gold, fluorite, barite, salt, coal, etc., in which barite with barium sulfate up to 94.8%.

The county has a subtropical monsoon humid climate with a sufficient heat, concentrated rainwater, cold winter and hot summer, distinct four seasons, variable spring temperatures, short freezing period, and long hot summer period. The average annual temperature is 17.8 degrees Celsius, annual rainfall is about 1268.8 millimeters, and the frost-free period is 287 days.

=== Climate ===
Climate data for Hengnan, elevation 137 m (449 ft), (1991–2020 normals, extremes 1981–present)
Month	Jan	Feb	Mar	Apr	May	Jun	Jul	Aug	Sep	Oct	Nov	Dec	Year
Record high °C (°F)	27.5 (81.5)	32.4 (90.3)	35.7 (96.3)	36.2 (97.2)	37.0 (98.6)	38.0 (100.4)	40.3 (104.5)	41.6 (106.9)	40.0 (104.0)	38.2 (100.8)	33.2 (91.8)	25.2 (77.4)	41.6 (106.9)
Mean daily maximum °C (°F)	9.5 (49.1)	12.5 (54.5)	16.6 (61.9)	23.3 (73.9)	27.9 (82.2)	31.0 (87.8)	34.5 (94.1)	33.9 (93.0)	30.1 (86.2)	24.7 (76.5)	18.6 (65.5)	12.5 (54.5)	22.9 (73.3)
Daily mean °C (°F)	6.0 (42.8)	8.5 (47.3)	12.4 (54.3)	18.5 (65.3)	23.1 (73.6)	26.5 (79.7)	29.5 (85.1)	28.6 (83.5)	24.9 (76.8)	19.6 (67.3)	13.8 (56.8)	8.1 (46.6)	18.3 (64.9)
Mean daily minimum °C (°F)	3.6 (38.5)	5.8 (42.4)	9.5 (49.1)	15.1 (59.2)	19.6 (67.3)	23.3 (73.9)	25.6 (78.1)	25.0 (77.0)	21.4 (70.5)	16.1 (61.0)	10.4 (50.7)	5.2 (41.4)	15.1 (59.1)
Record low °C (°F)	−5.0 (23.0)	−6.0 (21.2)	−0.9 (30.4)	3.2 (37.8)	10.0 (50.0)	13.0 (55.4)	18.6 (65.5)	17.9 (64.2)	12.9 (55.2)	4.0 (39.2)	−1.1 (30.0)	−7.7 (18.1)	−7.7 (18.1)
Average precipitation mm (inches)	79.1 (3.11)	86.0 (3.39)	164.3 (6.47)	146.6 (5.77)	179.3 (7.06)	171.3 (6.74)	121.1 (4.77)	120.9 (4.76)	49.5 (1.95)	61.4 (2.42)	79.6 (3.13)	56.2 (2.21)	1,315.3 (51.78)
Average precipitation days (≥ 0.1 mm)	15.9	14.9	19.2	16.9	16.3	15.0	10.2	11.7	8.9	9.4	11.1	11.3	160.8
Average snowy days	3.5	1.8	0.4	0	0	0	0	0	0	0	0	1.1	6.8
Average relative humidity (%)	83	82	84	81	81	82	74	76	78	77	79	79	80
Mean monthly sunshine hours	51.8	54.2	65.6	94.8	122.3	134.7	231.5	197.6	147.6	121.4	105.6	86.5	1,413.6
Percentage possible sunshine	16	17	18	25	29	33	55	49	40	34	33	27	31
Source: China Meteorological Administration All-time September high All-time Oct extreme

== Divisions ==
a township

- Xiangshi (相市乡)

21 towns

- Baogai (宝盖镇)
- Chashi (茶市镇)
- Guanshi (冠市镇)
- Hongshan (洪山镇)
- Huaqiao (花桥镇)
- Jiangkou (江口镇)
- Jilong (鸡笼镇)
- Jinweizhou (近尾洲镇)
- Liaotian (廖田镇)
- Lijiang (栗江镇)
- Liushi (硫市镇)
- Maoshi (茅市镇)
- Quanhu (泉湖镇)
- Quanxi (泉溪镇)
- Santang (三塘镇)
- Songjiang (松江镇)
- Tanzishan (谭子山镇)
- Tiesitang (铁丝塘镇)
- Xiantang (咸塘镇)
- Yunji (云集镇)
- Zuoshi (柞市镇)

== Economy ==
According to preliminary accounting of the statistical authority, the gross domestic product of Hengnan County in 2017 was 34,989 million yuan (5,182 million US dollars), up by 8.2 percent over the previous year. Of this total, the value added of the primary industry was 7,341 million yuan (1,087 million US dollars), up by 3.6 percent, that of the secondary industry was 14,927 million yuan (2,211 million US dollars), up by 6.3 percent and that of the tertiary industry was 12,721 million yuan (1,884 million US dollars), up by 13.4 percent. The value added of the primary industry accounted for 20.98 percent of the GDP; that of the secondary industry accounted for 42.66 percent; and that of the tertiary industry accounted for 36.36 percent. The per capita GDP in 2017 was 35,125 yuan (5,202 US dollars).

== Culture ==
Together with Hengyang County and the urban districts of Hengyang City, Hengnan belongs to the Hengyang dialect area. This dialect is typically classified under New Xiang.
