= Hengyang Metro =

Planned metro system in Hengyang, China

Overview
- Native name: 衡阳轨道交通
- Locale: Hengyang. Hunan, China
- Transit type: Monorail rapid transit
- Number of lines: 2 (phase 1)
- Number of stations: 43 (phase 1)

Operation
- Operation will start: 2025

Technical
- System length: 59.0km (phase 1)

Hengyang Metro (Chinese: 衡阳轨道交通; pinyin: Héngyáng Guǐdào Jiāotōng), officially Hengyang Rail Transit, is a planned monorail rapid transit system in Hengyang, Hunan, China. Once completed, the system is scheduled to comprise six lines and have a total length of 158 km.

== History ==
A rapid transit system in Hengyang has been planned since 2017. In September 2017, a contract was signed between the municipal council of Hengyang and BYD, whose Hunan headquarters are located within the city, for a straddle beam monorail system to be constructed in Hengyang.

== Lines ==
Line	Terminals		Planned Opening	Length km	Stations
1	Yumu Lake	Huajiang		29.6	24
2	Songmu Development Zone	Nanyue Airport		29.4	20
Total				59.0	43
