= Yanfeng, Hengyang =

Yanfeng 雁峰区
- District
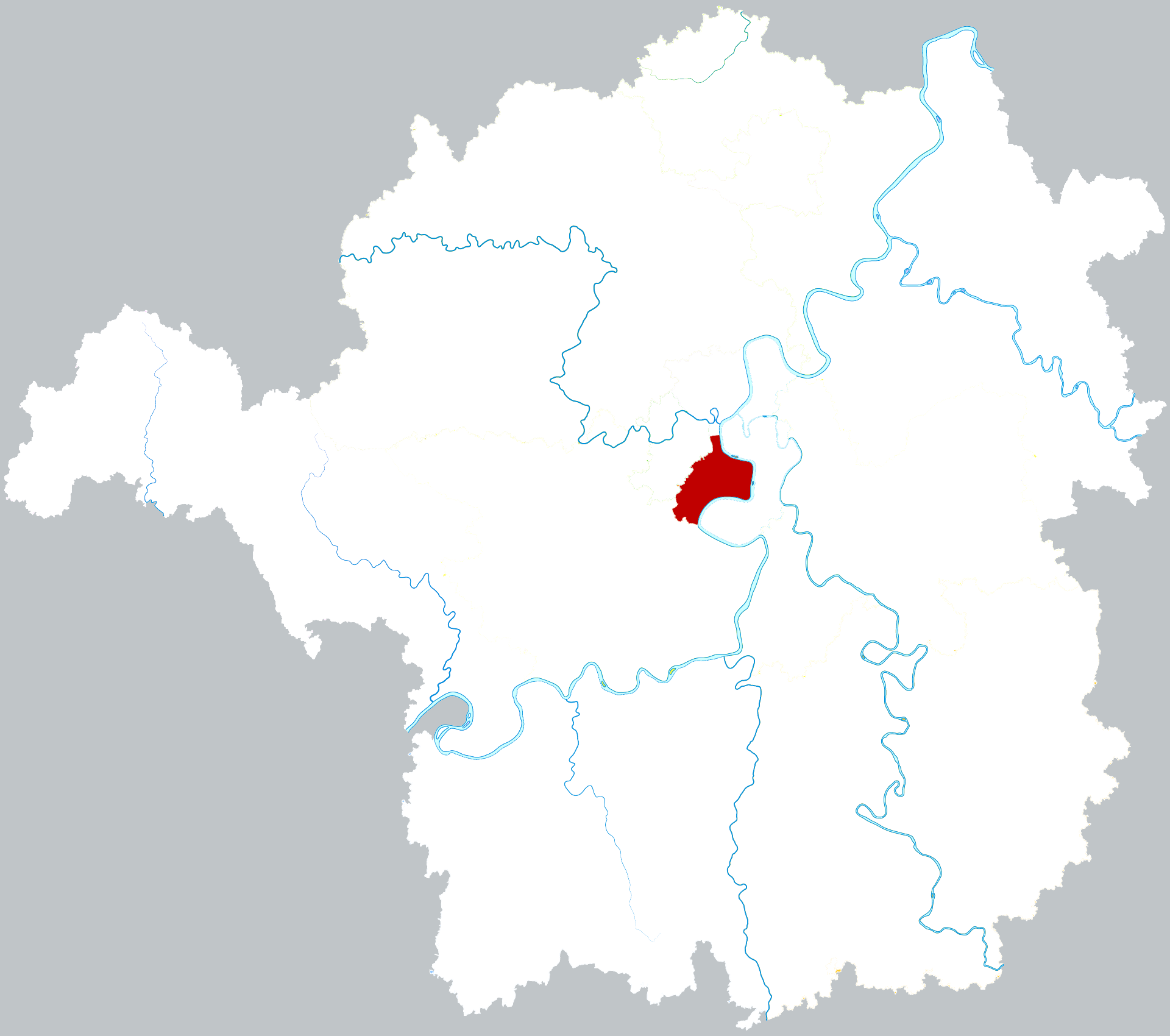
- Location in Hengyang

- Location in Hunan
- Coordinates: 26°50′25″N 112°36′50″E
- Country: People's Republic of China
- Province: Hunan
- Prefecture-level city: Hengyang
- Time zone: UTC+8 (China Standard)

Yanfeng District (simplified Chinese: 雁峰区; traditional Chinese: 雁峰區; pinyin: Yànfēng Qū) is an urban district of Hengyang City, Hunan province, China. The district is located in the middle south of the city proper and on the western bank of the Xiang River, it is bordered by Zhuhui District to the east, Hengnan County to the south, Zhengxiang District to the west, and Shigu District to the north. Yanfeng District covers an area of 94 km^{2} (36 sq mi), and as of 2015, it had a permanent resident population of 220,900 and a registered population of 193,700. The district has six subdistricts and a township under its jurisdiction.

== History ==
According to legend, "wild geese fly from north to south, stop in the Mount Huiyanfeng (Chinese: 回雁峰; lit. 'Mount Geese') to rest", the district was named after the mountain. The district of Yanfeng is historically a part of Hengyang County. On January 1, 1942, the provincial city of Hengyang was separated from the urban area and region around the county seat of Hengyang County.

The district of Yanfeng was established on April 4, 2001. In the adjustment of urban subdivisions in Hengyang, Yanfeng District administers five subdistricts of Yanfeng (雁峰), Baishazhou (白沙洲), Huangchaling (黄茶岭), Tianmashan (天马山) and Xianfenglu (先锋路) in the former Chengnan District (城南区), Xiangjiang Township (湘江乡; of which, Yangliu Village was transferred to Zhengxiang District) and Yuepin Township (岳屏乡; of which, three villages of Lianhe, Yuepin and Beitang were transferred to Zhengxiang District) in the former Jiaoqu (Suburb District) (郊区), and Wenchang Township (文昌乡) of Hengyang County.

== Administrative divisions ==
6 subdistricts

- Baishazhou (白沙洲街道)
- Huangchaling (黄茶岭街道)
- Jinlongping (金龙坪街道)
- Tianmashan (天马山街道)
- Xianfeng (先锋街道)
- Yanfeng (雁峰街道)

1 town

- Yueping (岳屏镇)
