= Hengyang County =

Hengyang County 衡阳县
- County
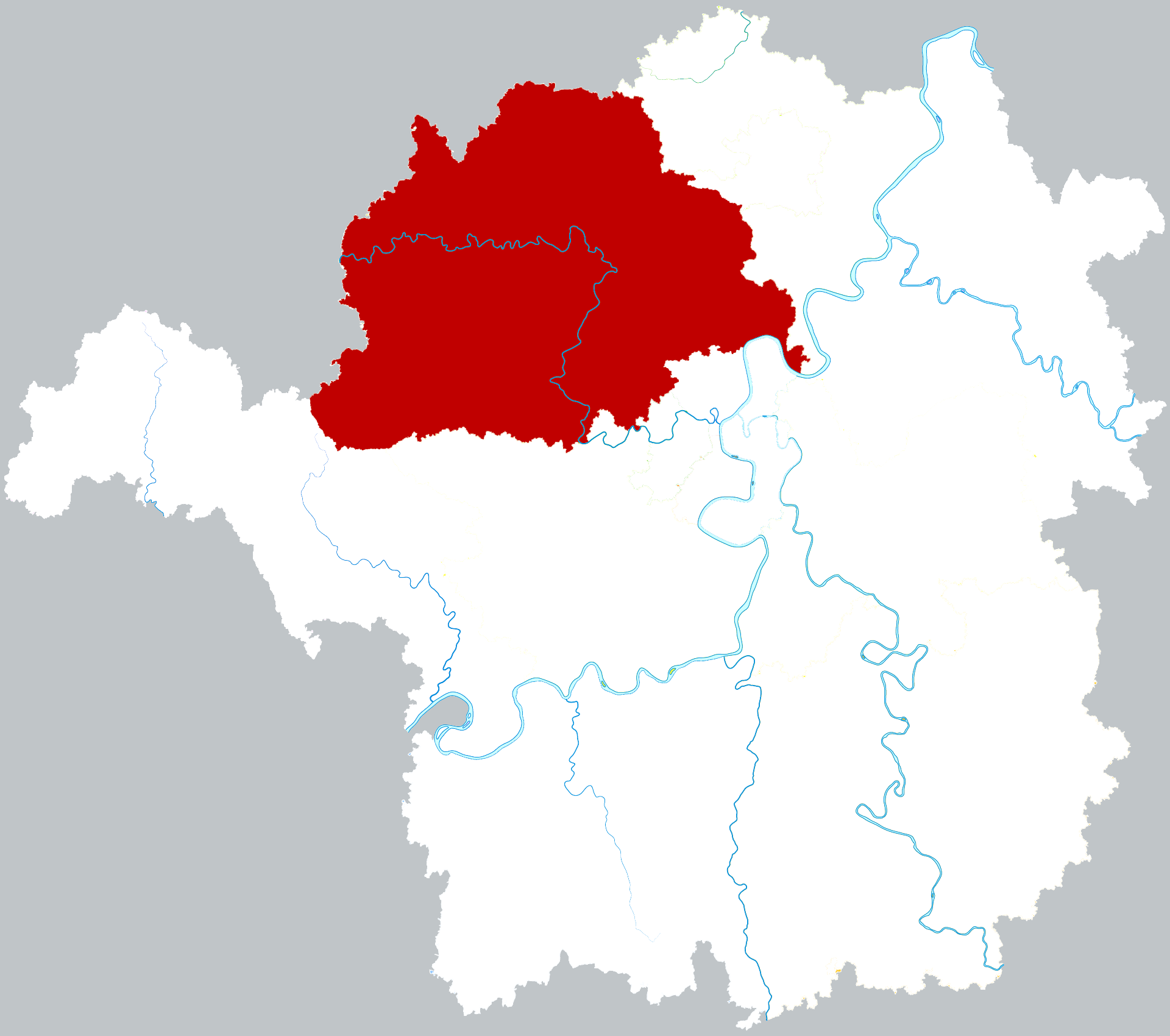
- Location in Hengyang

- Location in Hunan
- Coordinates: 26°58′11″N 112°22′14″E
- Country: People's Republic of China
- Province: Hunan
- Prefecture-level city: Hengyang
- Seat: Xidu
- Time zone: UTC+8 (China Standard)

Hengyang County (simplified Chinese: 衡阳县; traditional Chinese: 衡陽縣; pinyin: Héngyáng Xiàn; lit. 'south of Mount Heng') is a county and the 5th most populous county-level division in the Province of Hunan, China; it is under the administration of Hengyang prefecture-level city. Located in the north of Hengyang City and the southeast of Hunan province, the county is bordered to the north by Shuangfeng County, to the west by Shaodong County, to the south by the counties of Qidong and Hengdong and the districts of Zhengxiang, Shigu, and Zhuhui, and to the east by Nanyue District and Hengshan County. Hengyang County covers 2,558.61 km^{2} (987.88 sq mi) with a population of 1,235,100 (as of 2015). The county has 17 towns under its jurisdiction, and the county seat is Xidu Town (西渡镇).

== History ==
The county was the first time named after Hengyang in history; Hengyang County was formed through the amalgamation of the three counties of Linzheng (临蒸), Xincheng (新城) and Chong'an (重安) in 589 AD (Sui dynasty). After that, the county was again divided into three counties: Linzheng, Xincheng, and Chong'an. The two counties of Xincheng and Chong'an were merged into the county of Linzheng, and the county of Linzheng was turned back to the name of Hengyang in 732 AD.

The provincial city of Hengyang was established from three townships and urban areas of Hengyang County in January 1931. Hengnan County was formed from the 1st, 2nd, 4th and 9th districts in the southeastern portion of the county in April 1952, the county seat was transferred to Xidu Town in July 1952.

== Geography ==
The county of Hengyang is located northwest of Hengyang City and the middle reaches of the Xiang River. It borders Nanyue District and Hengshan County to the east, and it is adjacent to Zhengxiang District, Shigu District, and Hengnan County in the south, Qidong County and Shaodong County in the west, and Shuangfeng County in the north. It is 74 kilometers from east to west and 55 kilometers from north to south.

The mountainous part of the county is the extension of the Hengshan range, rolling up and down. Its terrain is high in the northwest and low in the southeast, with hills and plains staggered. There are many plains on both sides of the rivers. The Zheng River runs through the county and merges with the river of Xiang at Shiguzui. It is convenient for water transportation, with the Xiang River and Zheng River as the main channel. Mineral deposits in the county are placer gold, ceramic mud, coal, kaolin, limestone, barite, lead, and zinc.

=== Terrain ===
Hengyang County is located in the transitional zone between the rise of the Wuling Mountains and the subsidence of Dongting Lake, the northern edge of Hengyang Basin. The layers of tertiary red rock are deposited in the basin's center and are about 3,000 meters thick. A series of tenia fornices on the east, north, and west sides are centered around the central-south red basin, which has different structures.

=== Climate ===
Hengyang has a subtropical monsoon climate with cool summers and warm winters, mainly warm and humid. The annual precipitation is 1,452 mm (57.2 in), the annual average temperature is about 17.9 °C (64.2 °F), the average temperature in January is 4.6 °C (40.3 °F) and in July is 30.3 °C (86.5 °F).

Climate data for Hengyang County, elevation 91 m (299 ft), (1991–2020 normals, extremes 1991–present)
Month	Jan	Feb	Mar	Apr	May	Jun	Jul	Aug	Sep	Oct	Nov	Dec	Year
Record high °C (°F)	27.4 (81.3)	31.8 (89.2)	33.5 (92.3)	36.4 (97.5)	37.1 (98.8)	39.0 (102.2)	40.8 (105.4)	40.8 (105.4)	39.0 (102.2)	37.1 (98.8)	32.6 (90.7)	24.5 (76.1)	40.8 (105.4)
Mean daily maximum °C (°F)	9.3 (48.7)	12.2 (54.0)	16.4 (61.5)	23.1 (73.6)	27.8 (82.0)	30.9 (87.6)	34.4 (93.9)	33.7 (92.7)	29.9 (85.8)	24.4 (75.9)	18.4 (65.1)	12.3 (54.1)	22.7 (72.9)
Daily mean °C (°F)	6.0 (42.8)	8.5 (47.3)	12.3 (54.1)	18.4 (65.1)	23.1 (73.6)	26.6 (79.9)	29.7 (85.5)	28.8 (83.8)	24.9 (76.8)	19.6 (67.3)	13.9 (57.0)	8.2 (46.8)	18.3 (65.0)
Mean daily minimum °C (°F)	3.6 (38.5)	5.8 (42.4)	9.4 (48.9)	15 (59)	19.7 (67.5)	23.5 (74.3)	26.1 (79.0)	25.4 (77.7)	21.5 (70.7)	16.3 (61.3)	10.6 (51.1)	5.3 (41.5)	15.2 (59.3)
Record low °C (°F)	−4.5 (23.9)	−4.3 (24.3)	−0.9 (30.4)	3.6 (38.5)	10.0 (50.0)	16.9 (62.4)	18.8 (65.8)	18.5 (65.3)	10.5 (50.9)	6.5 (43.7)	−0.3 (31.5)	−7.4 (18.7)	−7.4 (18.7)
Average precipitation mm (inches)	68.3 (2.69)	76.5 (3.01)	145.2 (5.72)	143.7 (5.66)	181.7 (7.15)	163.2 (6.43)	123.8 (4.87)	96.5 (3.80)	56.1 (2.21)	60.8 (2.39)	74.2 (2.92)	52.9 (2.08)	1,242.9 (48.93)
Average precipitation days (≥ 0.1 mm)	14.4	13.9	18.4	17.2	15.7	14.0	10.1	10.5	8.1	8.7	10.1	9.9	151
Average snowy days	3.6	2.0	0.4	0	0	0	0	0	0	0	0.1	1.0	7.1
Average relative humidity (%)	79	79	82	80	80	81	73	75	76	75	76	75	78
Mean monthly sunshine hours	53.5	52.4	63.5	92.1	121.1	128.6	219.8	190.7	144.2	119.4	107.4	91.2	1,383.9
Percentage possible sunshine	16	16	17	24	29	31	52	48	39	34	33	28	31
Source: China Meteorological Administration

== Subdivision ==
17 towns

- Chajiang (渣江镇)
- Guanshi (关市镇)
- Hongshi (洪市镇)
- Jibing (集兵镇)
- Jiepai (界牌镇)
- Jingtou (井头镇)
- Jinlan (金兰镇)
- Jinxi (金溪镇)
- Kuzongqiao (库宗桥镇)
- Qulan (曲兰镇)
- Sanhu (三湖镇)
- Shanqiao (杉桥镇)
- Shishi (石市镇)
- Taiyuan (台源镇)
- Xianshan (岘山镇)
- Xidu (西渡镇)
- Yanpi (演陂镇)

8 townships

- Banshi (板市乡)
- Chang'an (长安乡)
- Da'an (大安乡)
- Goulou (岣嵝乡)
- Lanlong (栏垅乡)
- Xijiang (溪江乡)
- Zhangmu (樟木乡)
- Zhangshu (樟树乡)

== Economy ==
According to preliminary accounting of the statistical authority, the gross domestic product of Hengyang County in 2017 was 35,493 million yuan (5,257 million US dollars), up by 8.5 percent over the previous year. Of this total, the value added of the primary industry was 7,108 million yuan (1,053 million US dollars), up by 3.5 percent, that of the secondary industry was 12,656 million yuan (1,874 million US dollars), up by 7.4 percent, and that of the tertiary industry was 15,729 million yuan (2,330 million US dollars), up by 12.2 percent. The value added of the primary industry accounted for 20.03 percent of the GDP; that of the secondary industry accounted for 35.66 percent; and that of the tertiary industry accounted for 44.32 percent. The per capita GDP in 2017 was 33,115 yuan (4,905 US dollars).

== Culture ==
=== Dialect ===
The county belongs to the Hengyang dialect area, typically classified as New Xiang.

=== Tourist resources ===
- Gouloufeng National Forest Park (岣嵝峰国家森林公园): a forest park at the national level and one of the AAA-rated tourist attractions in China with an area of 20.67 km^{2} (7.98 sq mi) located in Goulou Township.
- Wanyuan Lake Scenic Area (万源湖风景旅游区): is a national water scenic area located between the towns of Jiepai and Shishi.
- Longwangxia Ecological Tourist Resort (龙王峡生态旅游度假区): a recreational resort with whitewater rafting, rock climbing, honorable person CS, and outward development located in Longwang Village of Jinlan Town.
- Xiangxi Cottage (湘西草堂): Xiangxi Cottage is the former residence of Wang Chuanshan (王船山故居), one of the provincial heritage conservation units of Hunan, a building of southern Hunan in the late Ming and early Qing dynasties located in Xiangxi Village of Qulan Town.
- Oriental Manor (东方庄园): a scenic spot of rural tourism with an area of 45.33 hectares, one of the national aquatic health farms by the Ministry of Agriculture, one of the provincial agricultural tourism demonstration sites of Hunan, and a Five - Star leisure manor in Hunan located in Yingpo Village of Xidu Town.
- Xia Minghan's Former residence: the Former Residence of Xia Minghan (夏明翰故居), an early leader of the Chinese Communist Revolution is a typical residence of southern Hunan in the Qing dynasty.
- Yishan Temple: the Yishan Temple (伊山寺) is a famous temple in China with a history of over 1,700 years located in the north of Yishan Village in Shanqiao Town.
- Weaver Lake Water Scenic Area (织女湖水利风景区): or Zhinu Lake Water Scenic Area, is one of the national water scenic areas in China located in Quanjing Village of Xinashan Town.
- Forest Ecological Park of Jiufen Mountain (九峰山森林生态公园): a forest ecological park located in Jiufeng Village of Xijiang Township.
- Danxia Landform Scenic Area of Shishi (石市丹霞地貌风景区): a danxia landform scenic area located in Shishi Town, the south of Hengshan Mountains and north of Hengyang County.
