= Zhengxiang Subdistrict =

Zhengxiang Subdistrict 蒸湘街道
- Subdistrict
- Location within Hunan
- Coordinates: 26°54′05″N 112°35′44″E
- Country: People's Republic of China
- Province: Hunan
- Prefecture: Hengyang
- District: Zhengxiang District
- Administrative centre: Taiping Residential Area
- Divisions: 13 communities and 3 villages

Area
  - Total: 12.53 km^{2} (4.84 sq mi)

Population (2015)
  - Total: 34,400
  - Density: 2,750/km^{2} (7,110/sq mi)
- Time zone: UTC+8 (China Standard)
- Area code: 0734
- Languages: Standard and Xiang Chinese

Zhengxiang Subdistrict (Chinese: 蒸湘街道; pinyin: Zhēngxiāng Jiēdào) is a subdistrict and the seat of Zhengxiang District in Hengyang, Hunan, China. The subdistrict has an area of about 12.53 km^{2} (4.84 sq mi) with a population of 73,800 (as of 2015). The subdistrict of Zhengxiang has three villages and 13 communities under its jurisdiction, and its administration office is at Taiping Residential Area (太平小区).

== History ==
The subdistrict of Zhengxiang was formed as a division of the former Chengbei District (城北区) in May 1978; it had 17 communities of Hengqi (衡祁), Hengshao (衡邵), Lianhecun (联合村), Lianhe Xincun (联合新村), Taiping I (太平一), Taiping II, Taiping III, Taiping IV, Dayuantou (大元头), Yanghuiqiao (阳辉桥), Jiefangxilu (解放西路), Xueyuanlu (学院路), Xueyuan Xicun (学院西村), Honghu (红湖), Honghutang (红湖塘), Yejin (冶金) and Yixueyuan (医学院) under its jurisdiction.

Before the urban district adjustment of Hengyang in June 2001, the subdistrict of Zhengxiang governed 19 communities. After adjustment of the urban divisions, Chengbei District was dissolved and Zhengxiang Subdistrict was placed under the jurisdiction of Zhengxiang District. The subdistrict administered 10 of the original 19 communities, and the remaining nine communities were respectively assigned to Hongxiang Subdistrict (红湘街道), Lianhe Subdistrict (联合街道) and Changhu Township (长湖乡).

The township of Changhu (长湖乡) was merged to it on November 18, 2015, the newly established subdistrict of Zhengxiang administered four villages of Lixin, Changhu, Dali and Songting; 13 communities of Liaojiawan, Lixin 1, Lixin II, Hengshao, Shijicheng, Pinghu, Xiaojiawan, Wenjiatai, Taiping 1, Taiping II, Dayuantou, Honghu and Yanghuiqiao in 2015; it covers an area of 12.53 km^{2} (4.84 sq mi). Through the amalgamation of village-level divisions in 2016, its division was reduced to 16 from 17.

== Subdivisions ==
The newly established subdistrict of Zhengxiang administered four villages and 13 communities in 2015. Through the amalgamation of village-level divisions in 2016, its division was reduced to 16 from 17, the subdistrict has three villages and 13 communities under its jurisdiction.

13 communities

- Dayuantou Community (大元头社区)
- Hengshao Community (衡邵社区)
- Honghu Community (红湖社区)
- Liaojiawan Community (廖家湾社区)
- First Community of Lixin Residential Area (立新小区一社区)
- Second Community of Lixin Residential Area (立新小区二社区)
- Pinghu Community (平湖社区)
- Shijicheng Community (世纪城社区)
- First Community of Taiping Residential Area (太平小区一社区)
- Second Community of Taiping Residential Area (太平小区二社区)
- Wenjiatai Community (温家台社区)
- Xiaojiawan Community (肖家湾社区)
- Yanghuiqiao Community (阳辉桥社区)

3 villages

- Changhu Village (长湖村)
- Dali Village (大立村)
- Songting Village (松亭村)
