= Shigu, Hengyang =

Shigu 石鼓区
- District
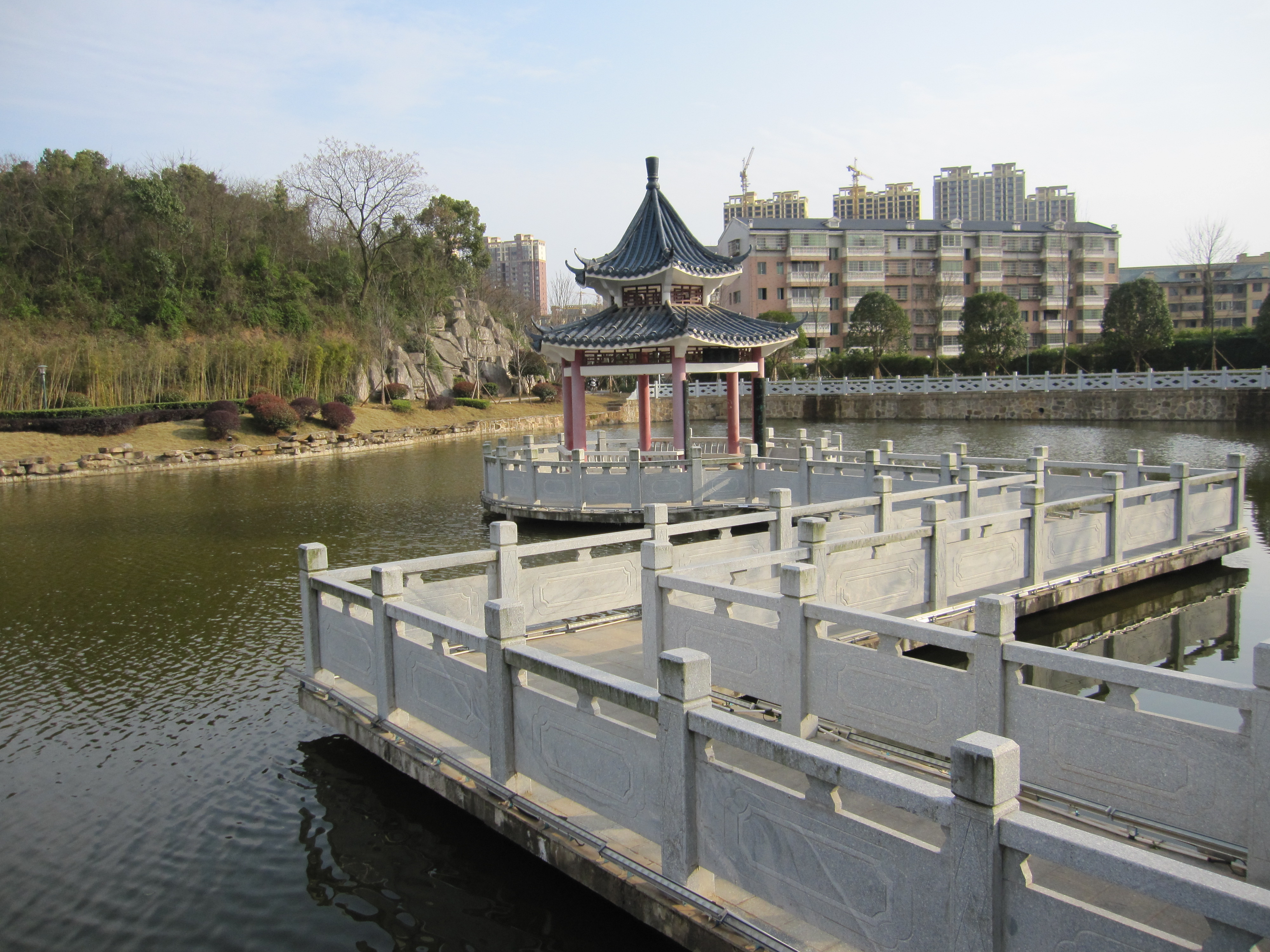

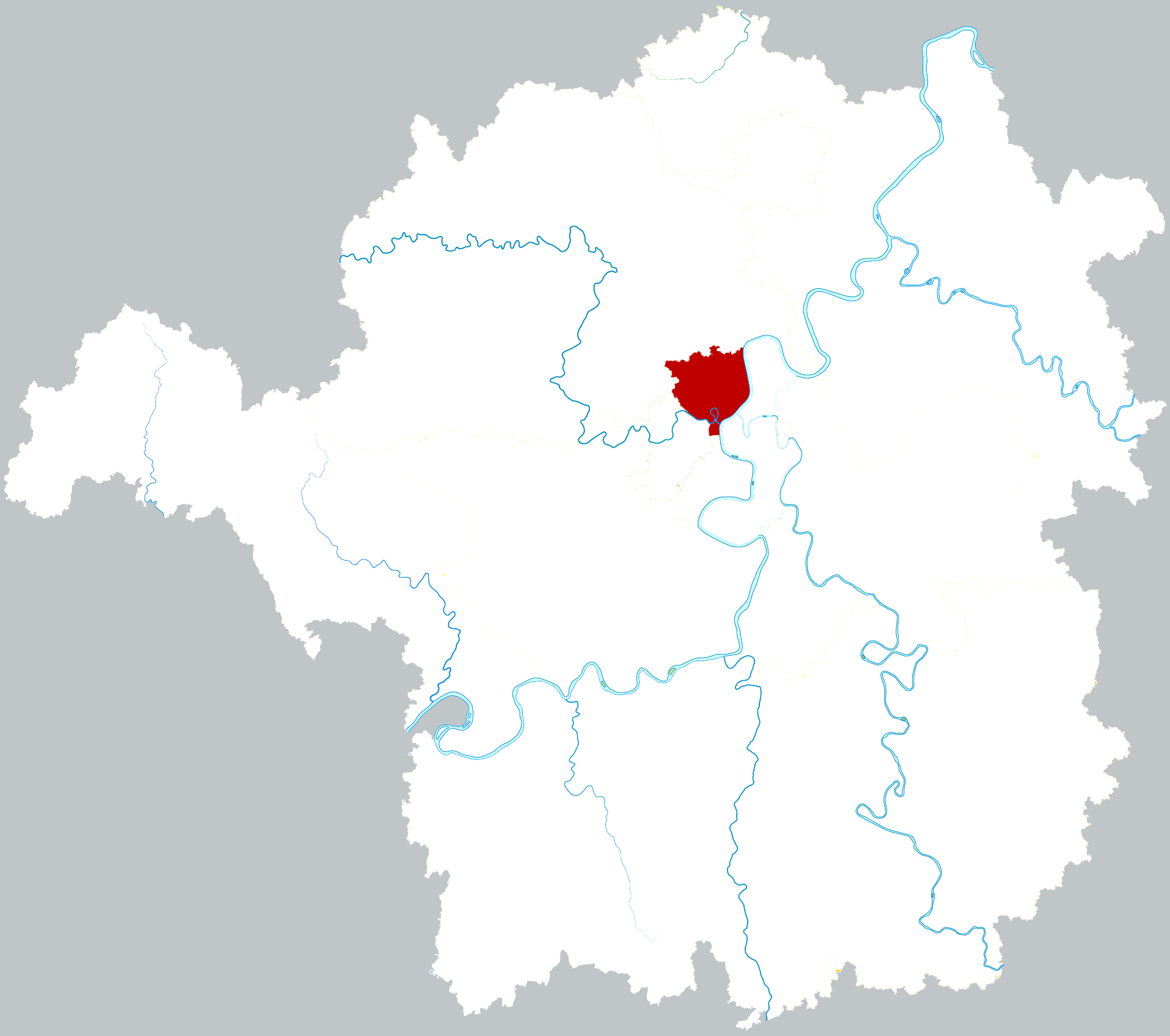
- Location in Hengyang

- Location in Hunan
- Coordinates: 26°56′36″N 112°35′53″E
- Country: People's Republic of China
- Province: Hunan
- Prefecture-level city: Hengyang
- Time zone: UTC+8 (China Standard)

Shigu District (simplified Chinese: 石鼓区; traditional Chinese: 石鼓區; pinyin: Shígǔ Qū) is an urban district of Hengyang City, Hunan province, China. The district is located in the middle north of the city proper, it is bordered by Zhuhui District to the east, Yanfeng District to the south, Zhengxiang District to the west, and Hengyang County to the north. Shigu District covers an area of 112 km^{2} (43 sq mi), and as of 2015, it had a permanent resident population of 231,700. The district has seven subdistricts and a township under its jurisdiction, the government seat is at Huangshawan Subdistrict (黄沙湾街道).

== History ==
The district of Shigu was part of Chu State in the Spring and Autumn period, it was part of Changsha Commandery (长沙郡) in the Qin period and a part of Ling County (酃县; formed in 202 BC) in the Han and Three Kingdoms periods.

Ling County was merged to Linzheng County (临烝县) in the East Jin period, it was part of Linzheng County. After Hengyang County was formed through the amalgamation of the three counties of Linzheng (临蒸), Xincheng (新城) and Chong'an (重安) in 589 AD (Sui dynasty), it was part of Hengyang County. On January 1, 1942, the provincial city of Hengyang was separated from the urban area and region around the county seat of Hengyang County, it was a part of the provincial city of Hengyang.

The district of Shigu was established on April 4, 2001, named after the Shigu Mountain (石鼓山). In the adjustment of subdivisions in Hengyang, Shigu District administers four subdistricts of Renminlu (人民路), Xiaoxiang (潇湘), Qingshan (青山), Wuyi (五一) and Hejiang (合江) in the former Chengbei District (城北区), Huangshawan Subdistrict and Songmu Township (松木乡) in the former Suburb District (郊区), four villages of Wuyi (五一), Jianshe (建设), You'ai (友爱) and Jiangxia (江霞) in Xihu Township (西湖乡; of which, Jianshe Village is placed under the jurisdiction of Wuyi Subdistrict, and three villages of Wuyi, Youai and Jiangxia are placed under the jurisdiction of Hejiang Subdistrict) and Jiaoshan Township (角山乡) of Hengyang County. The Zhengxiang Subdistrict of the former Chengbei District was transferred to Zhengxiang District.

== Geography ==
The district of Shigu is located in the north of Hengyang. It is bordered by Zhuhui District across the Xiang River to the east, Hengyang County to the northwest, Jiefang Road as the dividing line bordering Yanfeng District to the south, Zhengxiang North Road as the boundary bordering Zhengxiang District to the west.

The district is dominated by hillock landforms, surrounded by ancient ridges that form intermittent bands in the ridge mountains, and inlaid with large red Cretaceous and Lower Red Tertiary red hilly terraces, constituting a typical basin situation.

The main wild animals in the area include wild sheep, wild boars, white pheasants and pheasants. The main stream of the Xiang River runs near the Shigu Park through the urban area of Hengyang from Guiyang Town, Qidong County. In the south is Hongqihu Reservoir with an area of 22 hectares and its rain surface is two square kilometers; there are the Tongtang Reservoir in the north and Jiulongchong Reservoir and the Tonglutang Reservoir surround the foot of the mountains in the west.

== Administrative divisions ==
7 subdistricts

- Hejiang (合江街道)
- Huangshawan (黄沙湾街道)
- Jinyuan (金源街道)
- Qingshan (青山街道)
- Renmin (人民街道)
- Wuyi (五一街道)
- Xiaoxiang (潇湘街道)

1 township

- Jiaoshan (角山乡)
