= Zheng River =

- Location of mouth in Hunan

Location
- Country: China
- Province: Hunan

Physical characteristics
- Mouth
  - coordinates: 26°55′46″N 112°34′43″E

Basin features
- River system: Xiang River

Zheng River (Chinese: 蒸水; pinyin: Zhēngshuǐ) is a river of China. It flows into the Xiang River, which is part of the East China Sea basin.

== See also ==
- List of rivers in China
