= Hengyang =

Hengyang 衡阳市 Hengchow
- Prefecture-level city
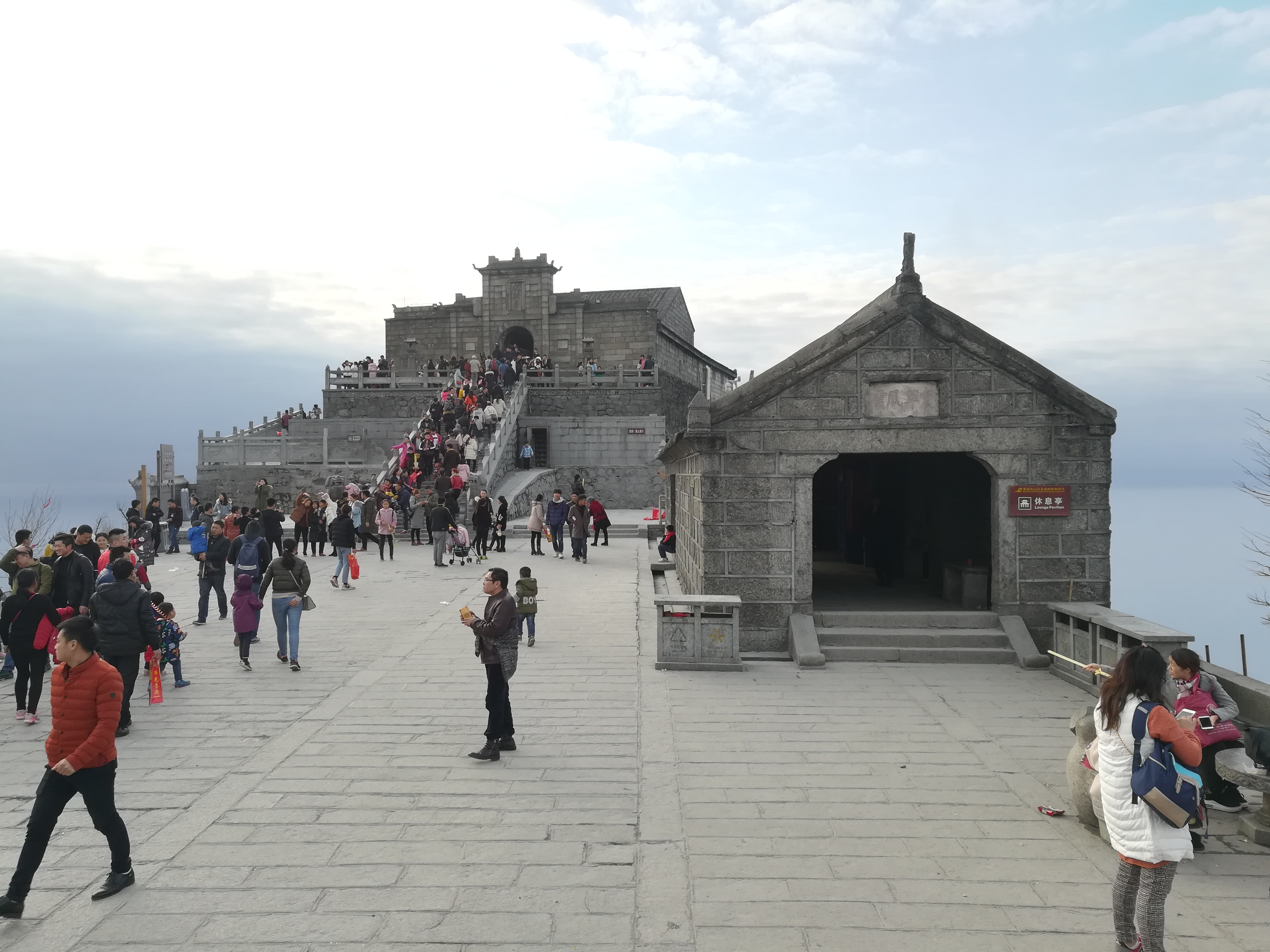
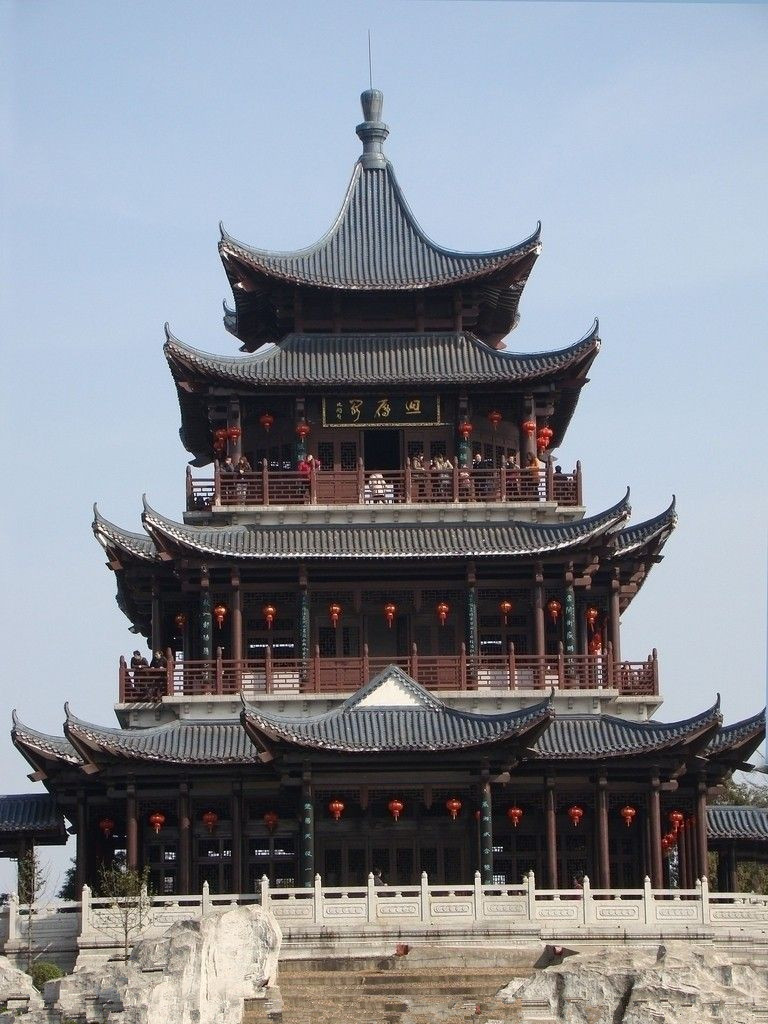
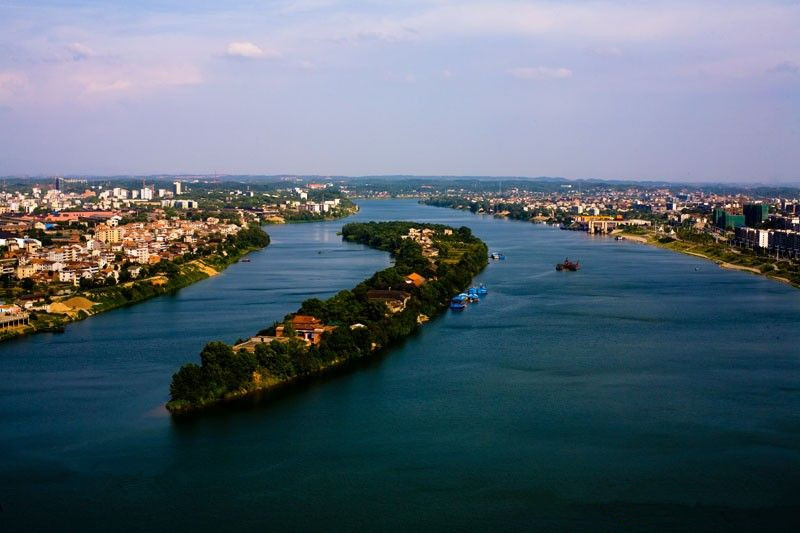
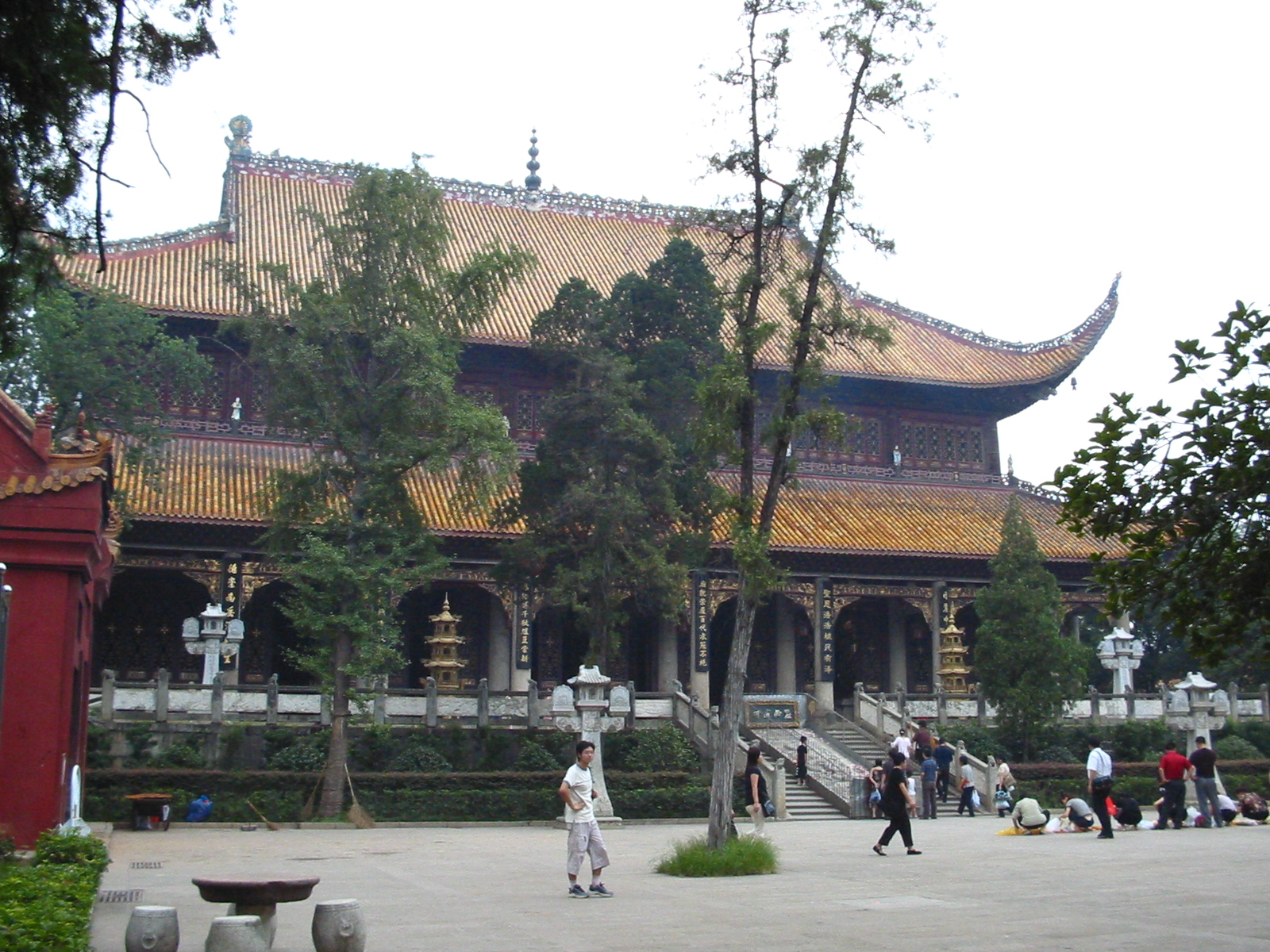
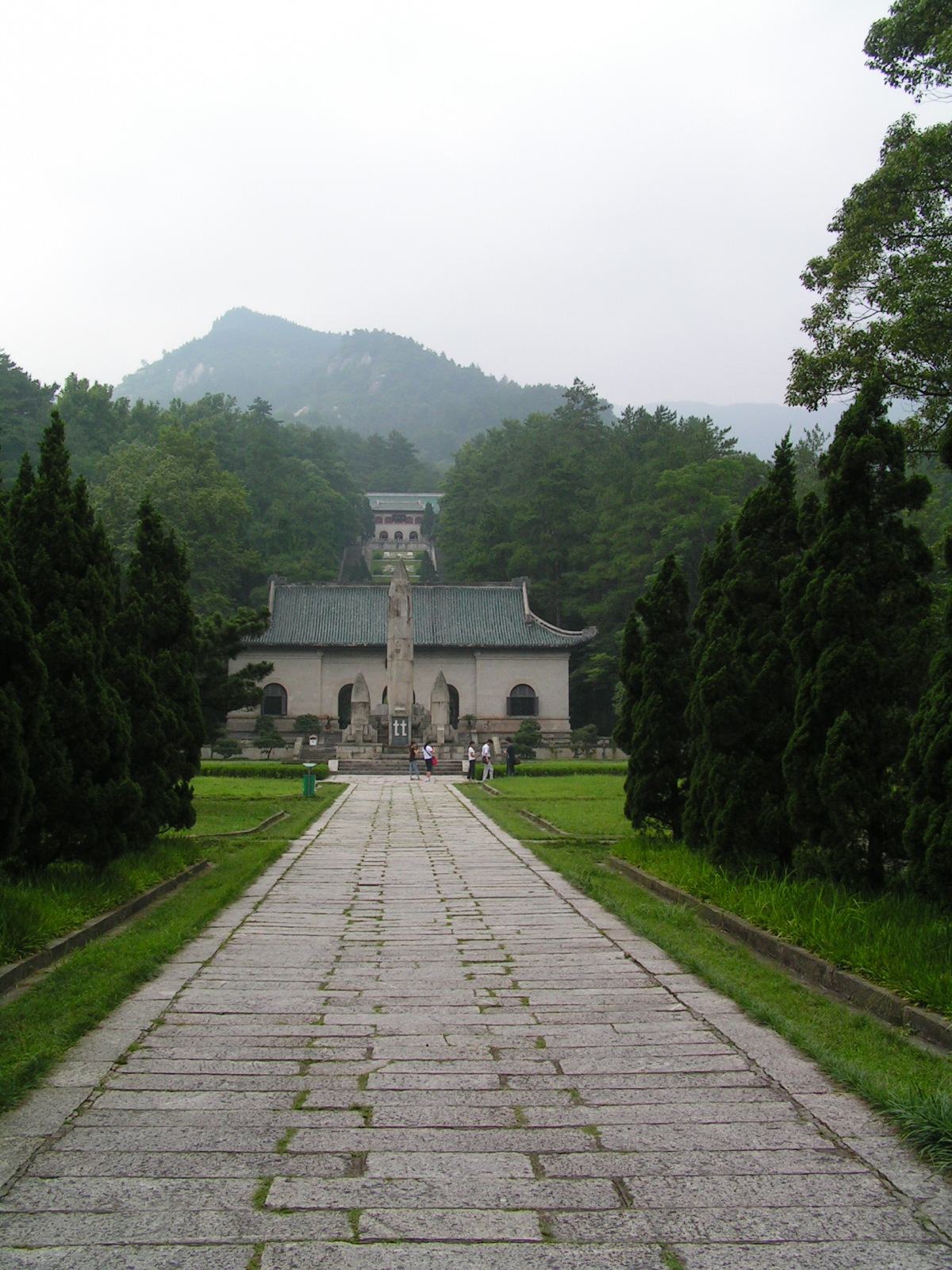
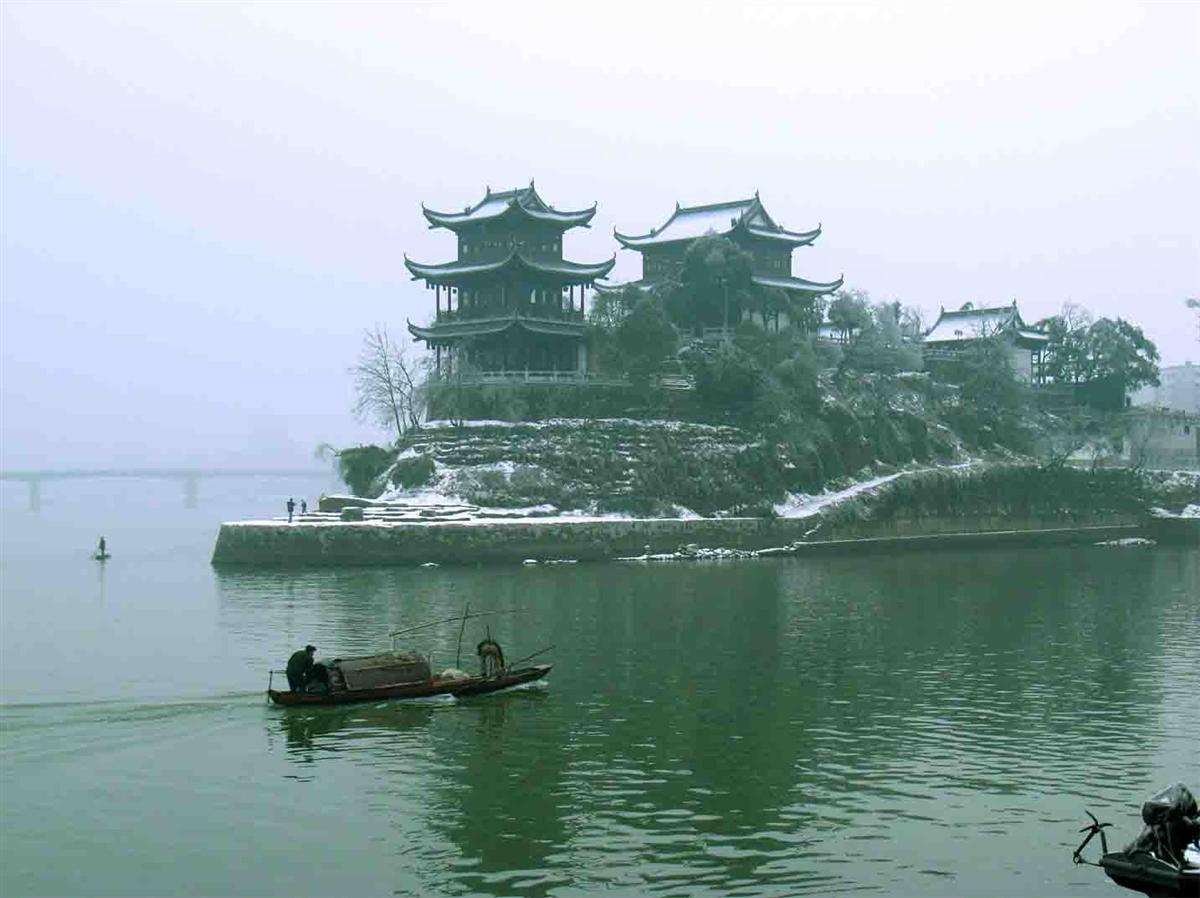
- Mount Heng Huiyan Peak Dongzhou Island Grand Temple of Mount Heng Nanyue Martyrs' Shrine Shigu Academy
- Nicknames: Wild Goose City (雁城), Bright Pearl in Southern China
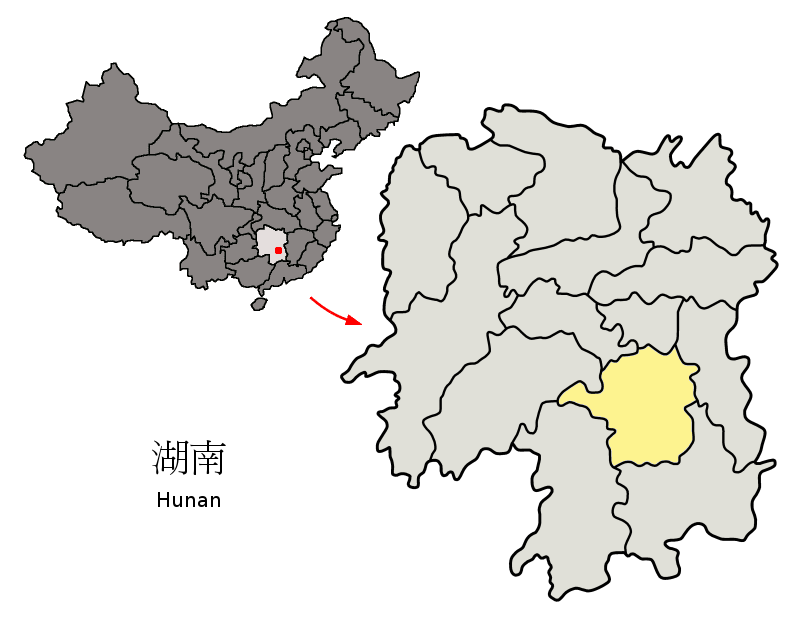
- Location of Hengyang City jurisdiction in Hunan

- Location of the city center in Hunan
- Coordinates (Hengyang government): 26°53′38″N 112°34′19″E
- Country: China
- Province: Hunan
- Prefecture seat: Yanfeng District

Government
  - Party Secretary: Zhu Jian
  - Mayor: Liu Zhongjie
  - Congress Chair: Liu Zhengxing
  - CPPCC Secretary: Wu Shuguang

Area
  - Prefecture-level city: 15,279 km^{2} (5,899 sq mi)
  - Urban: 722 km^{2} (279 sq mi)
  - Metro: 543 km^{2} (210 sq mi)

Population (2020 census)
  - Prefecture-level city: 6,645,243
  - Density: 434.93/km^{2} (1,126.5/sq mi)
  - Urban: 1,361,085
  - Urban density: 1,890/km^{2} (4,880/sq mi)
  - Metro: 1,290,715
  - Metro density: 2,380/km^{2} (6,160/sq mi)

GDP
  - Prefecture-level city: CN¥ 409.0 billion US$ 60.7 billion
  - Per capita: CN¥55,737; US$8,288
- Time zone: UTC+8 (China Standard)
- Postal code: 421001
- Area code: 0734
- ISO 3166 code: CN-HN-04
- Website: www.enghengyang.gov.cn

Hengyang (simplified Chinese: 衡阳; traditional Chinese: 衡陽; pinyin: Héngyáng; Mandarin pronunciation: [xə̌ŋ.jǎŋ]) is the second largest city of Hunan Province, China. It straddles the Xiang River about 160 km (99 mi) south of the provincial capital of Changsha. As of the 2020 Chinese census, Its total population was 6,645,243 inhabitants, of whom 1,290,715 lived in the built-up (or metro) area consisting of 4 urban districts, Nanyue District not being conurbated yet.

Hengyang is home to University of South China, Hengyang Normal University, and Hunan Institute of Technology, three major provincial public universities in the city.

== History ==
The former name of the city was Hengzhou (Hengchow) (衡州; Héngzhōu). This was the capital of a prefecture in the Tang dynasty's Jiangnan and West Jiangnan circuits. Li Jingxuan was banished to superintendence of Hengzhou after feigning an illness and attempting to usurp control of the legislative bureau at Chang'an against the Gaozong Emperor's wishes in AD 680. Following the AD 705 coup that removed the Empress Wu Zetian from power, her ally Li Jiongxiu was also briefly demoted to superintendence of this province. During the reign of Emperor Muzong, the chancellor Linghu Chu was also demoted to this province for his underlings' alleged corruption.

In the 750s, the superintendent of Hengzhou Chen Xi'ang not only ruled his own region but also used his private army to dominate his nominal superior, the military governor Zhang Weiyi headquartered in Jing Prefecture (modern Jingzhou). Upon Zhang's replacement by the former chancellor Lü Yin in 760, however, Chen was placated and then killed in a surprise attack.

During the reign of the Tang emperor Xizong, Zhou Yue overthrew first the prefect of Hengzhou Xu Hao in 881 and then the agent of the rebel Qin Zongquan in the capital of the Qinhua Circuit at Tan Prefecture (modern Changsha) in 886. Xizong confirmed Zhou Yue in all his posts, renaming his circuit Wu'an. Xizong's brother then gave him additional authority over West Lingnan Circuit (modern Guangxi). Shortly after, in 893, Deng Chune and Lei Man attacked and killed him.

Other superintendents included Qi Ying and Xiao Ye.

After initially falling to agrarian rebels under Yang Shiyuan, Hengzhou was recovered by the lord of Wu'an Ma Yin and formed part of his power base during the collapse of the Tang. He initially supported the Later Liang, then declared himself king (Ma Chu) in his own right during the Five Dynasties and Ten Kingdoms period.

During the Revolt of the Three Feudatories, Wu Sangui declared himself Emperor of the Great Zhou and established an imperial court at Hengzhou in 1678 before dying of illness later that year. His grandson Wu Shifan then retreated to Yunnan, and the Qing recovered Hengzhou the next year.

The Battle of Hengyang was the longest defense of a single city during the Second Sino-Japanese War. When Changsha fell to the Imperial Japanese Army on June 19, 1944, Hengyang became their next target. The reorganized 11th Army, consisting of 10 divisions, four brigades, and over 110,000 men, assumed the task of attacking Hengyang. It was part of the Japanese Ichi-Go offensive.

A Roman Catholic diocese of Hengzhou was established, although periodically suppressed. This was suffragan to the Archbishop of Changsha following its elevation in 1946.

== Economy ==
Hengyang has an area of 15,279 km^{2} (5,899 sq mi) and a population of 7,141,162. There are 1,075,516 people in the built-up area of 522 km^{2} (202 sq mi) in the four central urban districts. Hengyang is a busy and growing industrial City and the leading transportation centre of Hunan, linking water, rail, and highway routes. Manufacturing includes: chemicals, agricultural, mining equipment, textiles, paper and processed foods. Lead, zinc, coal, and tin are mined nearby. Hengyang is the second largest city in Hunan province, and is a growing industrial hub and transportation center.

== Tourism ==
Known as the 'Bright Pearl in Southern China' and as 'Wild Goose City' (the latter because of wild geese that used to rest here while flying south for the winter), Hengyang has been the birthplace of many historical figures, such the revolutionist Luo Ronghuan and a noted Ming scholar Wang Fuzhi. The city was badly damaged during World War II and few historical buildings survive in diverse stage of reconstruction, including Shigu Academy, Dragon Tower, Confucian School on the Dongzhou Island (东洲岛), Laiyan Pagoda and Nantai Temple. Mount Heng, one of the Five Sacred Mountains, lies 45 kilometres north from the city proper.

== Climate ==
Hengyang has a humid subtropical climate (Köppen Cfa), with four distinct seasons. Spring is subject to heavy rainfall, while the summers are long, hot, and humid with lesser rainfall, and autumn is comfortable and rather dry. Winter is rather brief, but cold snaps occur with temperatures occasionally dropping below freezing, and while not heavy, rain can be frequent. The monthly daily mean temperature ranges from 6.0 °C (42.8 °F) in January to 29.8 °C (85.6 °F) in July.

Climate data for Hengyang, elevation 105 m (344 ft), (1991–2020 normals, extremes 1971–2010)
Month	Jan	Feb	Mar	Apr	May	Jun	Jul	Aug	Sep	Oct	Nov	Dec	Year
Record high °C (°F)	27.7 (81.9)	32.2 (90.0)	36.0 (96.8)	37.0 (98.6)	37.3 (99.1)	38.6 (101.5)	40.2 (104.4)	41.3 (106.3)	38.7 (101.7)	36.5 (97.7)	32.6 (90.7)	26.3 (79.3)	41.3 (106.3)
Mean daily maximum °C (°F)	9.3 (48.7)	12.2 (54.0)	16.4 (61.5)	23.2 (73.8)	27.8 (82.0)	31.0 (87.8)	34.5 (94.1)	33.7 (92.7)	29.7 (85.5)	24.3 (75.7)	18.3 (64.9)	12.2 (54.0)	22.7 (72.9)
Daily mean °C (°F)	6.4 (43.5)	8.8 (47.8)	12.7 (54.9)	18.8 (65.8)	23.4 (74.1)	26.9 (80.4)	30.0 (86.0)	29.1 (84.4)	25.4 (77.7)	20.1 (68.2)	14.3 (57.7)	8.7 (47.7)	18.7 (65.7)
Mean daily minimum °C (°F)	4.2 (39.6)	6.3 (43.3)	10.0 (50.0)	15.6 (60.1)	20.2 (68.4)	23.9 (75.0)	26.4 (79.5)	25.8 (78.4)	22.2 (72.0)	16.9 (62.4)	11.3 (52.3)	6.0 (42.8)	15.7 (60.3)
Record low °C (°F)	−6.2 (20.8)	−7.9 (17.8)	−0.3 (31.5)	3.7 (38.7)	10.2 (50.4)	13.2 (55.8)	18.9 (66.0)	18.3 (64.9)	12.8 (55.0)	5.4 (41.7)	−0.7 (30.7)	−5.9 (21.4)	−7.9 (17.8)
Average precipitation mm (inches)	81.6 (3.21)	85.8 (3.38)	159.0 (6.26)	150.6 (5.93)	179.1 (7.05)	169.0 (6.65)	119.1 (4.69)	117.8 (4.64)	55.0 (2.17)	62.4 (2.46)	81.6 (3.21)	58.8 (2.31)	1,319.8 (51.96)
Average precipitation days (≥ 0.1 mm)	15.4	14.4	18.7	16.6	16.0	14.2	10.0	10.5	8.6	9.7	10.9	10.7	155.7
Average snowy days	3.5	2.0	0.5	0	0	0	0	0	0	0	0	0.9	6.9
Average relative humidity (%)	78	77	79	77	76	78	70	72	72	71	73	73	75
Mean monthly sunshine hours	57.4	58.6	73.1	101.1	130.9	137.8	232.3	197.6	152.9	130.4	112.5	96.4	1,481
Percentage possible sunshine	17	18	20	26	31	33	55	49	42	37	35	30	33
Source 1: China Meteorological Administration
Source 2: Weather China

== Government ==
The city has a dual party-government system under whole-process people's democracy, like all administrative divisions of mainland China. The Mayor of Hengyang is the highest-ranking official in the People's Government of Hengyang and is elected by Hengyang City People's Congress. The current mayor, Liu Zhongjie (Chinese: 刘中杰), is also secretary of the municipal government's Communist Party branch and deputy secretary of the Party Committee. The mayor has less power than the secretary of the Party Committee of Hengyang, currently Zhu Jian (Chinese: 朱健) since November 2025. Zhu had been mayor, and briefly held both posts before arrangements were completed for the election of a new mayor in December 2025. The chair of the City People's Congress Standing Committee is Liu Zhengxing (Chinese: 刘正兴) and the secretary of the City People's Political Consultative Conference is Wu Shuguang (Chinese: 吴曙光).

=== Administrative divisions ===
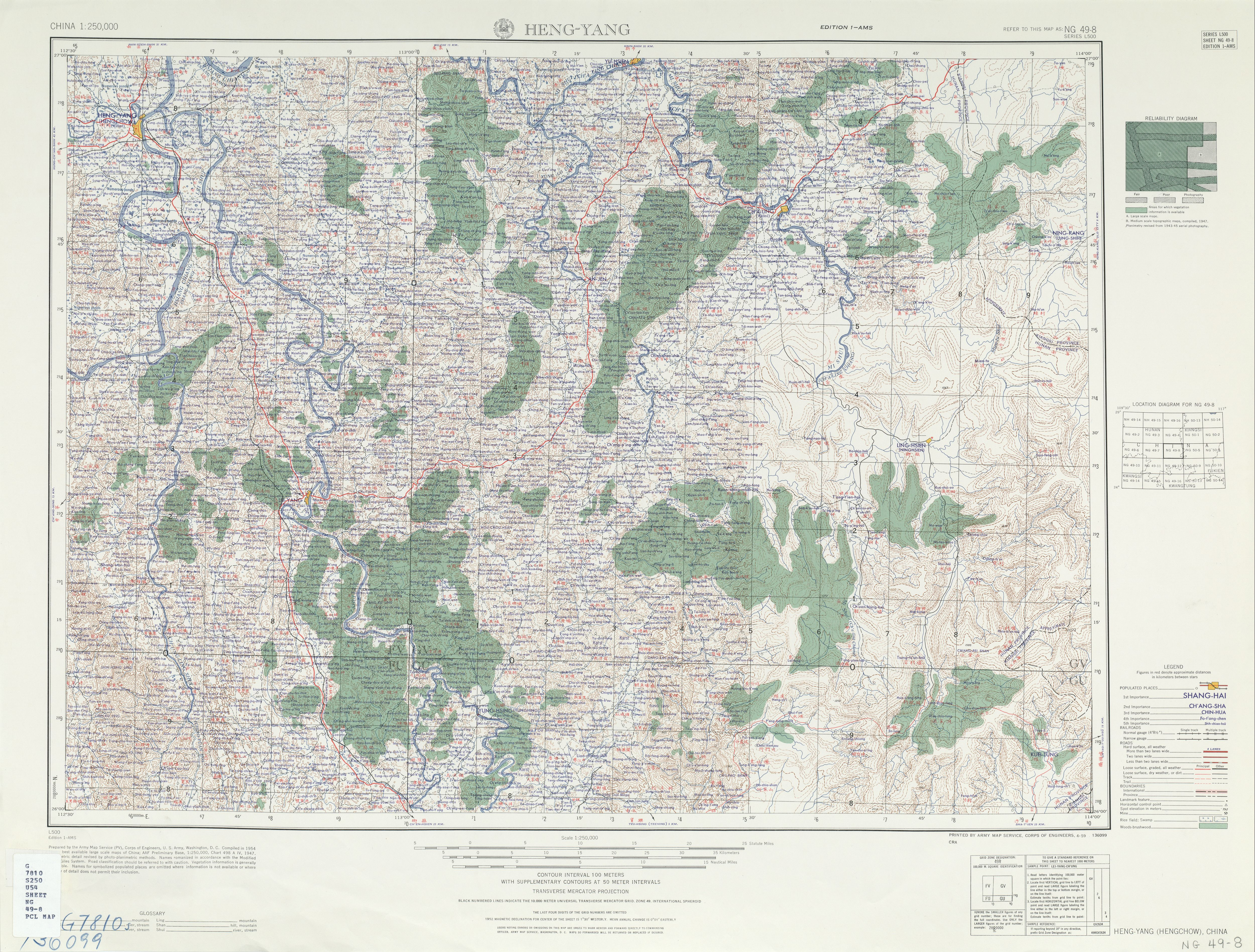
Map including Hengyang (labeled as HENG-YANG (HENGCHOW) (Walled) 衡陽) (AMS, 1954)

- Yanfeng District (雁峰区)
- Zhuhui District (珠晖区)
- Shigu District (石鼓区)
- Zhengxiang District (蒸湘区)
- Nanyue District (南岳区)
- Changning City (常宁市)
- Leiyang City (耒阳市)
- Hengyang County (衡阳县)
- Hengnan County (衡南县)
- Hengshan County (衡山县)
- Hengdong County (衡东县)
- Qidong County (祁东县)

Map
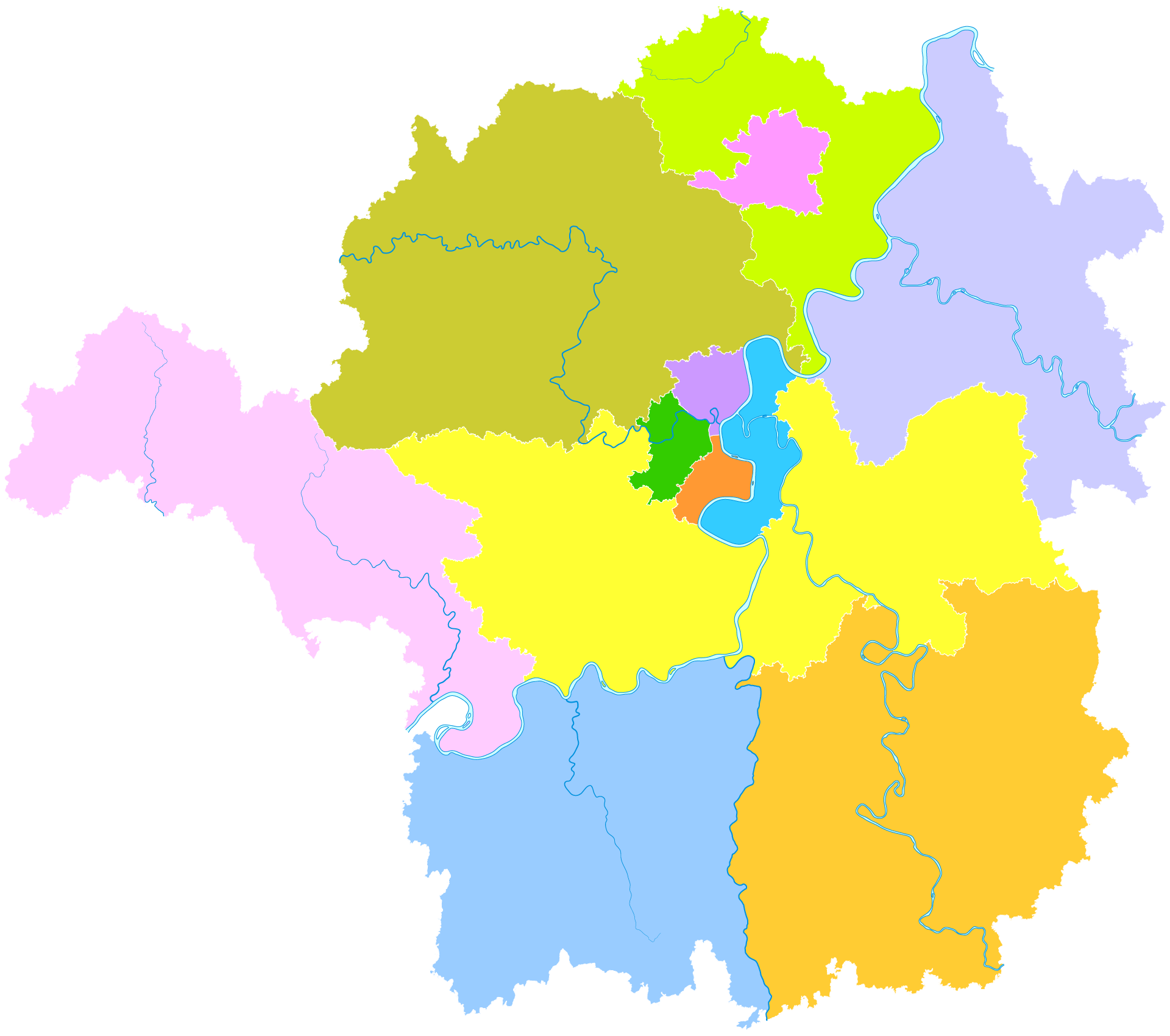

=== Controversies ===
In 2013, Hengyang was the center of a major vote buying scandal where it was found that 56 officials were complicit in paying lower level local officials for votes. The 56 were subsequently removed from office, and an additional 512 resigned from their positions.

One former mayor and three former Party Secretaries were placed under investigation by the CCDI between 2013 and 2016, during Xi Jinping's anti-corruption campaign. On December 8, 2013, Chen Anzhong was dismissed, arrested and investigated for corruption. On December 18, 2013, Tong Mingqian was placed under investigation for "serious violations of laws and regulations". In April 2016, Li Yilong was placed under investigation for alleged "serious violations of discipline and laws." On November 8, 2016, Zhang Wenxiong was placed under investigation for alleged "serious violations of discipline".

=== List of mayors of Hengyang ===
No.	Name	Took office	Left office	Notes
1	Yang Minzhi (Chinese: 杨敏之)	October 1980	March 1985	
2	Zhai Shouzheng (Chinese: 翟守政)	March 1985	January 1988	
3	Su Jianmin (Chinese: 苏建民)	January 1988	October 1991	
4	He Wenbing (Chinese: 何文彬)	October 1991	July 1993	
5	He Tongxin (Chinese: 贺同新)	August 1993	November 1996	
6	Chen Anzhong (Chinese: 陈安众)	November 1996	September 1999	
7	Xu Minghua (Chinese: 徐明华)	September 1999	September 2001	
8	He Renyu (Chinese: 贺仁雨)	September 2001	December 2005	
9	Peng Chonggu (Chinese: 彭崇谷)	December 2005	June 2008	
10	Zhang Ziyin (Chinese: 张自银)	June 2008	January 2009	Acting
11	Zhang Ziyin (Chinese: 张自银)	January 2009	March 2013	
12	Zhou Haibing (Chinese: 周海兵)	March 2013	May 2013	Acting
13	Zhou Haibing (Chinese: 周海兵)	May 2013	June 2017	
14	Zheng Jianxin (Chinese: 郑建新)	July 2017	April 2018	
15	Deng Qunce (Chinese: 邓群策)	April 2018	February 2020	
16	Zhu Jian (Chinese: 朱健)	10 February 2020	23 December 2025	
17	Liu Zhongjie (Chinese: 刘中杰)	29 December 2025		

=== List of Party Committee secretaries of Hengyang ===
No.	Name	Took office	Left office	Notes
1	Liao Renke (Chinese: 廖仁柯)	May 1983	March 1985	
2	Yang Minzhi (Chinese: 杨敏之)	March 1985	February 1988	
3	Zhai Shouzheng (Chinese: 翟守政)	February 1988	August 1991	
4	Su Jianmin (Chinese: 苏建民)	August 1991	July 1993	
5	Yan Yongsheng (Chinese: 颜永盛)	July 1993	March 1999	
6	Mei Kebao (Chinese: 梅克保)	March 1999	August 2001	
7	Xu Minghua (Chinese: 徐明华)	August 2001	March 2008	
8	Zhang Wenxiong (Chinese: 张文雄)	March 2008	March 2013	
9	Tong Mingqian (Chinese: 童名谦)	February 2012	April 2013	
10	Li Yilong (Chinese: 李亿龙)	March 2013	March 2016	
11	Zhou Nong (Chinese: 周农)	April 2016	January 2018	
12	Zheng Jianxin (Chinese: 郑建新)	January 2018	February 2020	
13	Deng Qunce (Chinese: 邓群策)	February 2020	October 2021	
14	Qin Guowen (Chinese: 秦国文)	October 2021	September 2022	
15	Liu Yuegao (Chinese: 刘越高)	September 2022	November 2025	
16	Zhu Jian (Chinese: 朱健)	November 2025		

== Colleges and universities ==
This is a list of institutions with full-time bachelor programs in Hengyang:

- University of South China (南华大学)
- Hengyang Normal University (衡阳师范学院)
- Hunan Institute of Technology (湖南工学院)
- Hunan University of Technology Hengyang (湖南工业大学衡阳分校)

== Transport ==
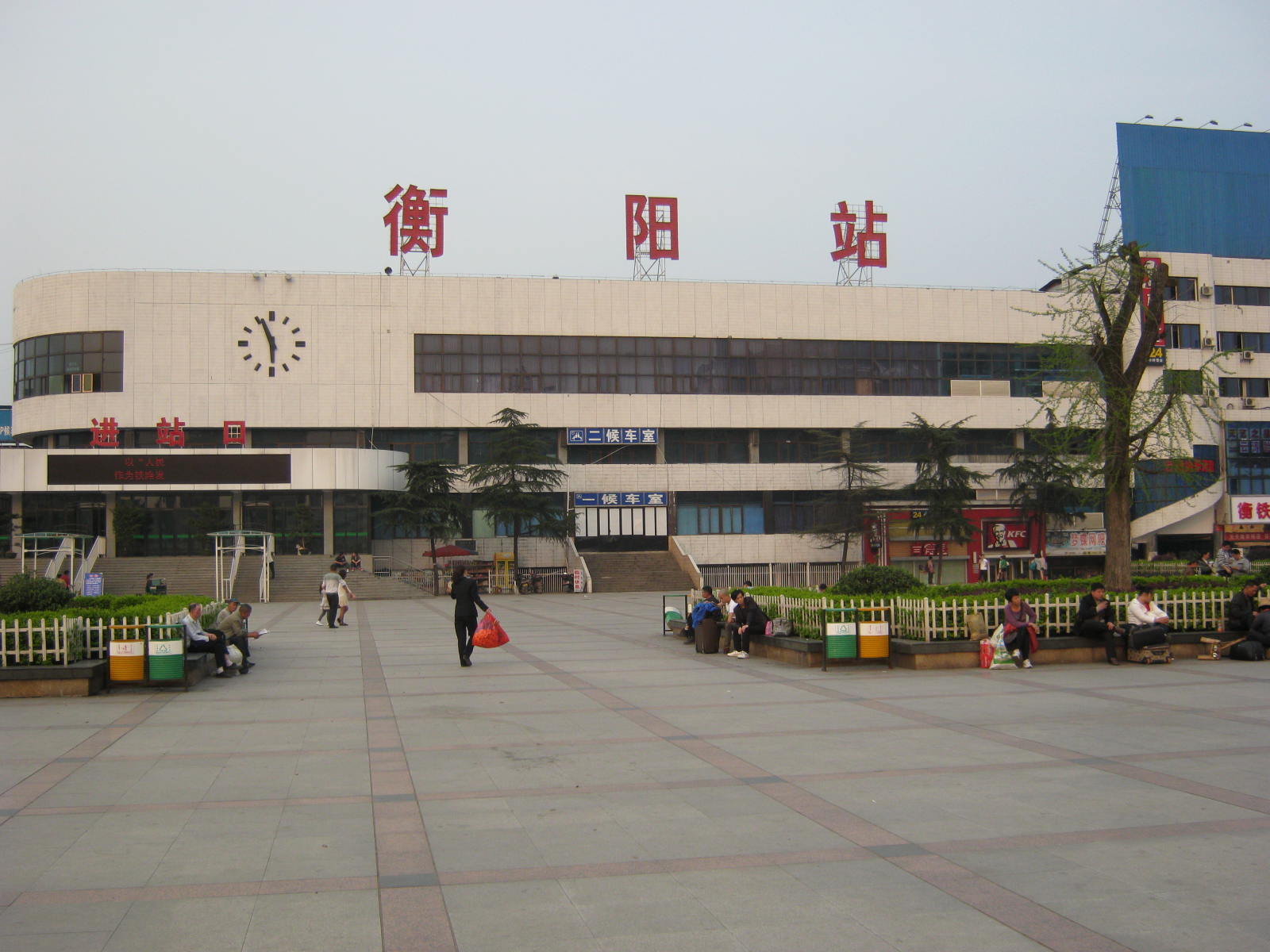
Hengyang Railway Station

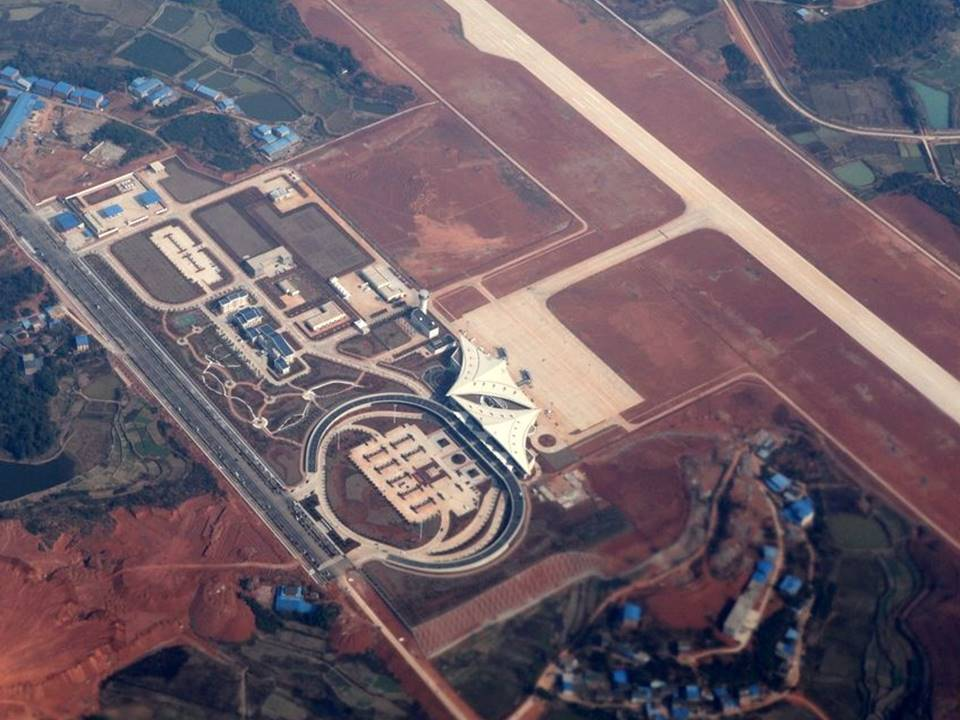
Hengyang Nanyue Airport

Hengyang is one of the 45 highway hubs in China. G4 Beijing–Hong Kong and Macau Expressway and G72 Quanzhou–Nanning Expressway intersect here. China National Highway 107 (to Beijing, to Guangzhou) and China National Highway 322 (to Kunming) pass the city centre.

Two bus terminals are located in the city. One is Hengyang Western Terminal which is located in the city centre and operates provincial lines and intra-metro lines in northern and western directions. Another is LingHu Terminal which operates lines of southern and eastern directions and locates on the edge of the city.

Hengyang is an important transport hub in southern China. The Beijing–Guangzhou railway and Hunan–Guangxi railway intersect at Hengyang. Hengyang railway station is one of the ten largest railway stations in China and is recognized as one of the extra-premium level stations. More than 100 trains pass by and stop at Hengyang Railway Station, making it one of the busiest stations all over the country and connecting it to most cities of China.

The city's new Hengyang East railway station is served by the Wuhan–Guangzhou high-speed railway and the Huaihua–Shaoyang–Hengyang railway. The Hengyang Metro is a planned monorail rapid transit system.

Opened in 2014, the city is served by Hengyang Nanyue Airport.

== Culture ==
=== Dialect ===
Hengyang dialect, spoken in the city districts, Hengyang County and Hengnan County, is part of the New Xiang dialect group as is the dialect of Hengdong County. The urban dialect is significantly influenced by Southwestern Mandarin. Qidong County speaks Old Xiang while the county-level cities of Leiyang and Changning speak Gan dialects.

=== Intangible cultural heritage ===
By the end of 2022, Hengyang City has 8 national intangible cultural heritage protection programs and 27 provincial ones.

== Notable people ==
- Ho Chen Tsu (1918–1994), born in Hengyang, architect and architecture educator
- Zhou Yaqin (2005), born in Hengyang, Silver medalist, 2024 Paris Olympics
