= Dongjiang Dam =

- Location within China
- Country: China
- Location: Zixing, Chenzhou, Hunan Province
- Coordinates: 25°52′22″N 113°18′34″E
- Status: Operational
- Construction began: 1978
- Opening date: 1992

Dam and spillways
- Type of dam: Arch, double-curvature
- Impounds: Lishui River
- Height: 157 m (515 ft)
- Length: 438 m (1,437 ft)
- Elevation at crest: 294 m (965 ft)
- Width (crest): 7 m (23 ft)
- Width (base): 35 m (115 ft)

Reservoir
- Creates: Dongjiang Lake
- Total capacity: 9,565,000,000 m^{3} (7,754,472 acre⋅ft)
- Catchment area: 4,719 km^{2} (1,822 sq mi)
- Normal elevation: 285 m (935 ft)

Power Station
- Commission date: 1987
- Type: Conventional
- Hydraulic head: 118.5 m (389 ft)
- Turbines: 4 x 125 MW Francis-type
- Installed capacity: 500 MW

The Dongjiang Dam is an arch dam on the Lishui River 14 km (9 mi) southwest of Zixing in Hunan Province, China. The dam was constructed between 1978 and 1992 and supports a 500 MW hydroelectric power station. The dam also provides for flood control, navigation and water supply. The dam's first generator was operational in 1987 and the reservoir, Dongjiang Lake, forced the relocation of fifty-two thousand people.

== Design ==
The Dongjiang is a 157 m (515 ft) tall and 438 m (1,437 ft) long variable-radius arch dam. The dam is 7 m (23 ft) wide at its crest, 35 m (115 ft) at its base and has a curve radius of 302.3 m (992 ft). Situated at the head of a 4,719 km^{2} (1,822 sq mi) catchment area, the dam withholds a reservoir of up to 9,565,000,000 m^{3} (7,754,472 acre⋅ft) of water. The dam's power station lies at its base and contains four 125 MW Francis turbine-generators. The height of the dam affords each generator an effective hydraulic head of 118.5 m (389 ft). The dam is also equipped with a boat/lumber lift.

== See also ==
- List of tallest dams in the world
