= Suxian =

Suxian may refer to:

- Suxian District, in Chenzhou, Hunan, China
- Suxian Hill, in Hunan, China
- Su County, or Suxian, former name of Suzhou, city in Anhui, China
