= Yuxi, Yizhang =

Town in Hunan, China

Coordinates: 25.40092°N 112.94706°E

Yuxi Town (Chinese: 玉溪镇; pinyin: Yùxī Zhèn) is a town and the county seat in the central south of Yizhang County, Hunan, China. The town was formed through the amalgamation of Chengnan Township (Chinese: 城南乡) and Chengguan Town (Chinese: 城关镇) in 2012, it has an area of 178.6 km^{2} (69.0 sq mi) with a population of 84,300 (as of 2012). Yuxi Town is located under the Qitian Mountains, it is bordered by Pingshi Town of Lechang City to the south, Wuling Town (Chinese: 五岭镇) to the east, Liangtian Town (Chinese: 良田镇) of Suxian District to the north, and Meitian Town (Chinese: 梅田镇) to the west. Its seat is at Luojiashan Village (Chinese: 罗家山村).
