= Suxianling =

Subdistrict in Hunan, China

Coordinates: 25°47′57″N 113°2′17″E

Suxianling Subdistrict (Chinese: 苏仙岭街道; pinyin: Sūxiānlǐng Jiēdào) is a subdistrict and the seat of Suxian District in Chenzhou Prefecture-level City, Hunan, China. The subdistrict was formed through the amalgamation of part of Beihu Subdistrict (Chinese: 北湖街道) and part of Nanta Subdistrict (Chinese: 南塔街道) in April 1983. It has an area of 5.7 km^{2} (2.2 sq mi) with a population of 72,400 (as of 2012). Its seat is at Suxianling Community (Chinese: 苏仙岭社区).

== See also ==
- List of township-level divisions of Hunan
- Suxian Hill
