= Luoxian Subdistrict =

Subdistrict of Chenzhou, Hunan, China

Coordinates: 25°48′47″N 113°1′14″E

Luoxian Subdistrict (Chinese: 骆仙街道; pinyin: Luòxiān Jiēdào) is a subdistrict and the seat of Beihu District in Chenzhou Prefecture-level City, Hunan, China. The subdistrict was formed through the amalgamation of Gaobi Village (Chinese: 高壁村) of the former Chenjiang Town (Chinese: 郴江镇), Luoxian Community (Chinese: 骆仙社区) of Yanquan Subdistrict (Chinese: 燕泉街道) and 3 villages of the former Shijao Township (Chinese: 市郊乡) in April 2012. It has an area of 23.88 km^{2} (9.22 sq mi) with a population of 19,400 (as of 2012). In May 2016, the subdistrict was divided into 3 communities and 2 villages. Its seat is at Luoxianpu (Chinese: 骆仙铺).
