= Renmin Road Subdistrict, Chenzhou =

Renmin Road Subdistrict 人民路街道
- Subdistrict
- Location in Hunan
- Coordinates: 25°47′58″N 113°1′41″E
- Country: China
- Province: Hunan
- Prefecture-level city: Chenzhou
- District: Beihu District
- Time zone: UTC+8 (China Standard Time)

Renmin Road Subdistrict (Chinese: 人民路街道; pinyin: Rénmínlù Jiēdào) is a subdistrict situated in Beihu District, Chenzhou, Hunan, China. As of 2020, it administers the following twelve residential neighborhoods:

- Beihu Road Community (北湖路社区)
- Guoqingbei Road Community (国庆北路社区)
- Renminxi Road Community (人民西路社区)
- Feijiping Community (飞机坪社区)
- Wenhua Road Community (文化路社区)
- Renmindong Road Community (人民东路社区)
- Wanhuachong Community (万花冲社区)
- Dongfeng Community (东风社区)
- Yanquan Road Community (燕泉路社区)
- Xijie Community (西街社区)
- Guanyuan Community (冠园社区)
- Linyi Community (林邑社区)

== See also ==
- List of township-level divisions of Hunan
