= Oujiang =

Oujiang may refer to:

- Oujiang, Hunan, a town in Guidong County, Hunan, China
- Ou River (Zhejiang), a river in Zhejiang, China
- Wenzhounese, a Sinitic language from Wenzhou, Zhejiang, China
