= Qitian Mountains =

Mountain range in Hunan, China

Coordinates: 25.8°N 113°E

The Qitian Mountains (Chinese: 騎田嶺; pinyin: qí-tián lǐng), also known as Guiyang Mountains (Chinese: 桂陽嶺; pinyin: guì-yáng lǐng) are a series of mountains located in Chenzhou, Hunan Province, the smallest one of the Five Ranges in the Nanling Mountains. The Qitan Mountains runs through Beihu District and Yizhang County in the southwestern Chenzhou.
