= Wugai Mountain =

Mountain in Hunan, China

Wugai Mountain (Chinese: 五盖山; pinyin: Wǔgàishān) is located in the Chenzhou area of Hunan province in China. It reaches 1600 metres above sea level. It is the location of Wugai Mountain Hunting Field.

Among the types of animals that live in the dense woods that cover the mountain are sambar, wild boar and chamois.
