= Xiangnan =

Xiangnan or Xiang Nan may refer to:

== Geography ==
- Xiangnan Tuhua (Chinese: 湘南土话)
- Xiangnan University (Chinese: 湘南学院), Suxian, Chenzhou, Hunan, China

== People ==
- Li Xiangnan (Chinese: 李向南)
- Xiang Nan (Chinese: 项南)
