= Gaoyi Ridge =

Mountain ridge in Hunan, China

- 高椅岭
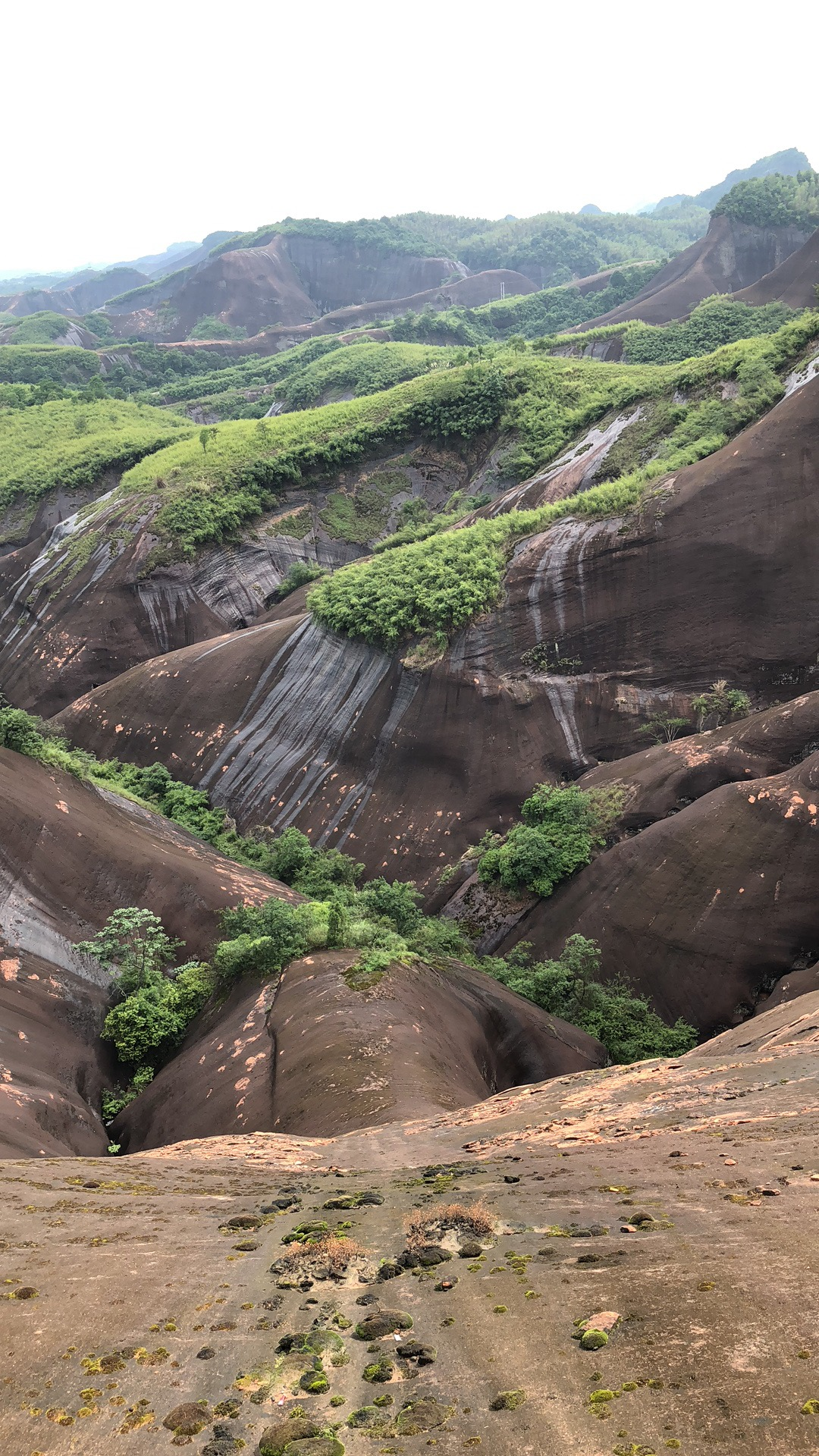
- Gaoyi Ridge in June 2018

- Location within Hunan
- Type: Public park
- Location: Suxian District, Chenzhou, Hunan
- Coordinates: 25°57′41″N 113°09′24″E
- Area: 50.5-square-kilometre (19.5 sq mi)
- Status: Open all year

Gaoyi Ridge (simplified Chinese: 高椅岭; traditional Chinese: 高椅嶺; pinyin: Gāoyǐlǐng) or Gaoyi Ridge Scenic Spot (高椅岭风景区) is a mountain ridge on the border of Suxian District, Chenzhou and Zixing in Hunan province, China. It covers an area of 50.5 square kilometres (19.5 sq mi).

== Gallery ==
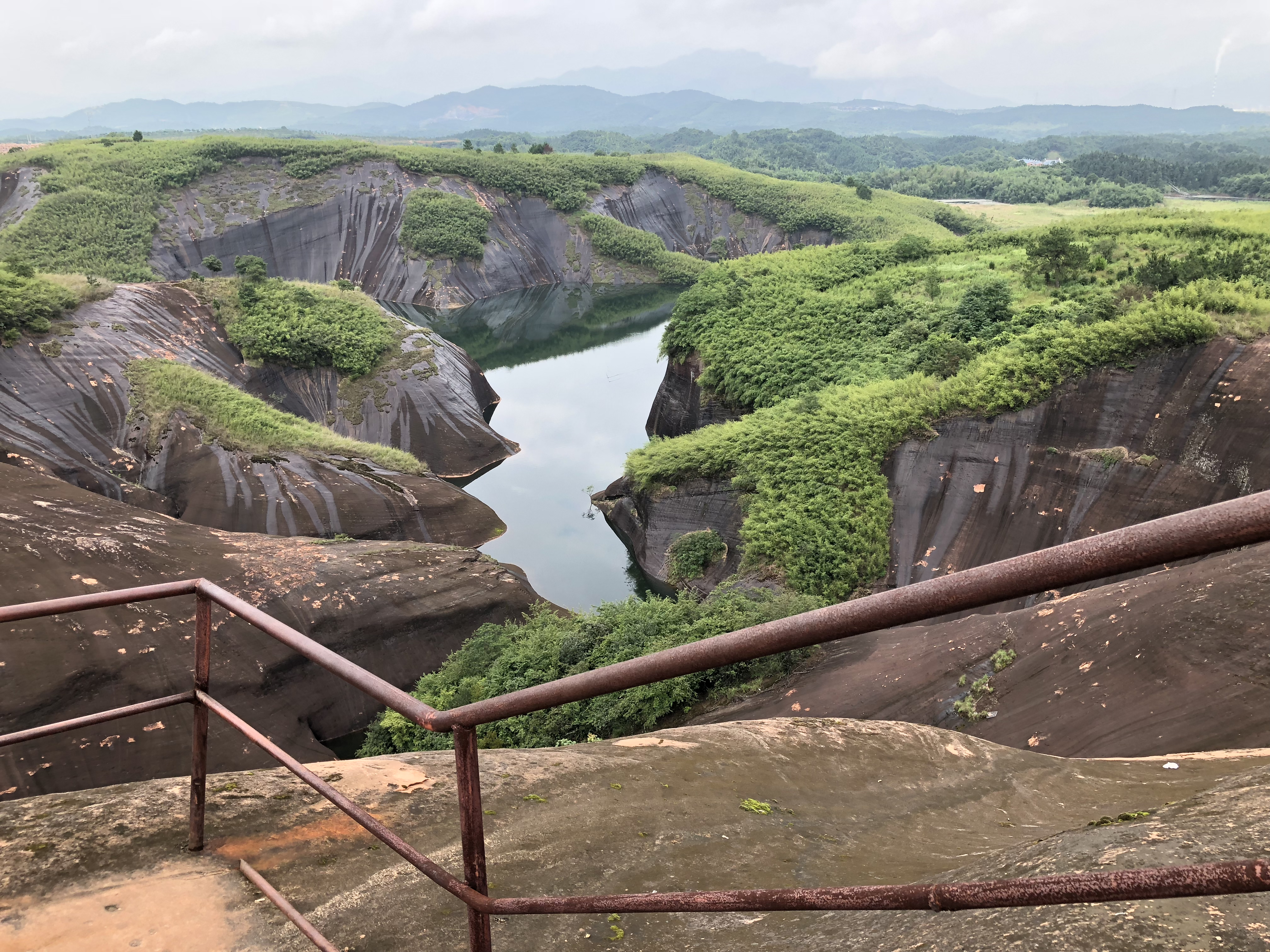

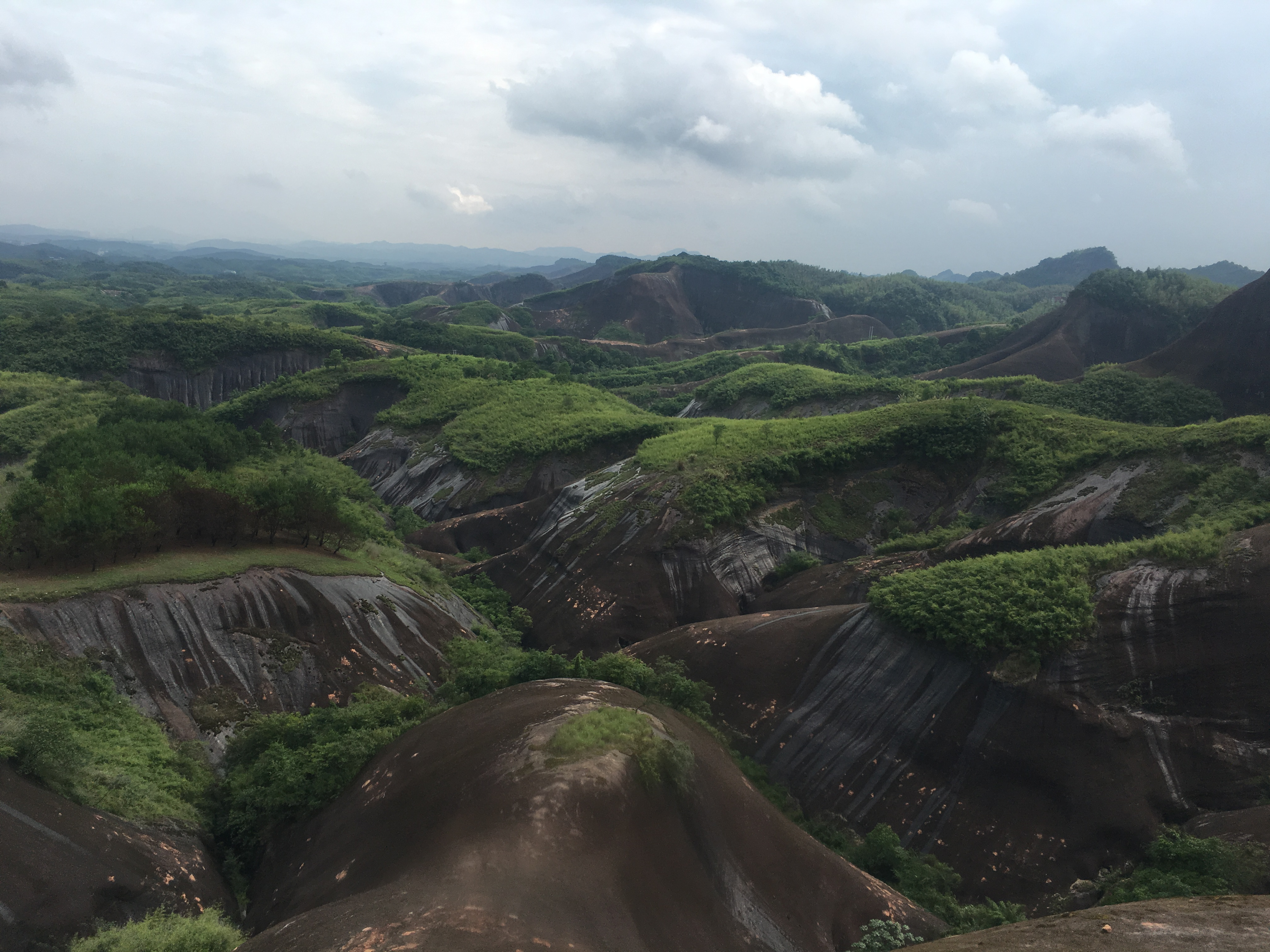

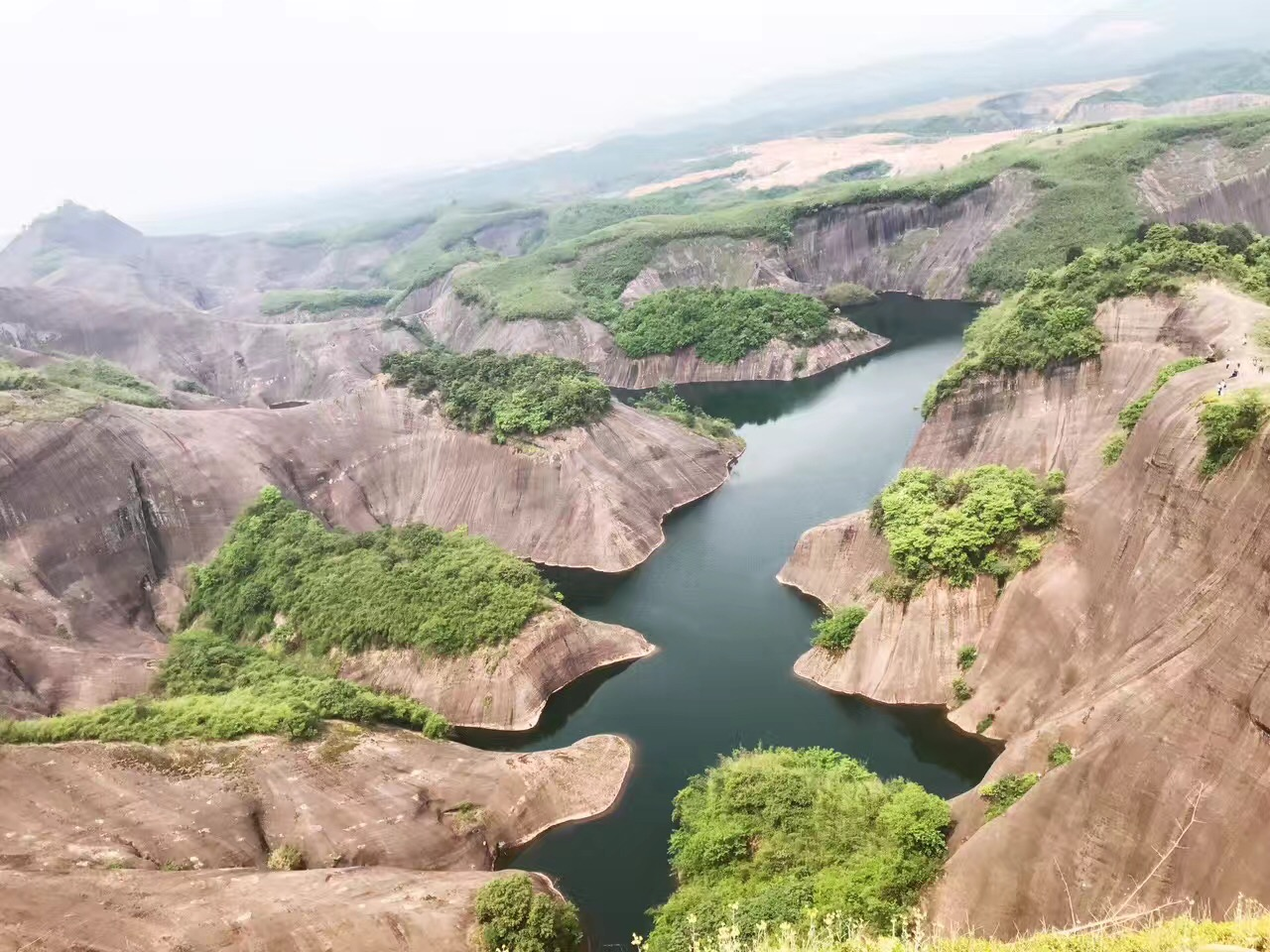
