= Shunfeng =

Shunfeng may refer to:

- Shunfeng, Linwu (舜峰镇, Shùnfēng Zhèn), a town in Linwu County, Hunan
- Shunfeng Township (顺峰乡, Shùnfēng Xiāng) in Wan'an County, Ji'an, Jiangxi
- Shunfeng station (顺风, Shùnfēng) in Chengdu, Sichuan
- SF Express (顺丰速运, Shùnfēng Sùyùn), a delivery and logistics company headquartered in Shenzhen, Guangdong
  - SF Airlines (顺丰航空公司, Shùnfēng Hángkōng Gōngsī), a cargo airline owned by SF Express
