= HCZ =

HCZ may refer to:

- Harlem Children's Zone, a New York charity
- Chenzhou Beihu Airport, Hunan, China (IATA:HCZ)
