= Liangtian, Hunan =

Liangtian 良田镇
- Town
- Location in Hunan
- Coordinates: 25°37′23″N 113°0′17″E
- Country: People's Republic of China
- Province: Hunan
- Prefecture-level city: Chenzhou
- District: Suxian District
- Time zone: UTC+8 (China Standard)

Liangtian (Chinese: 良田; pinyin: Liángtián) is a town under the administration of Suxian District, Chenzhou, Hunan, China. As of 2018, it has three residential communities and 23 villages under its administration.
