= Linwu County =

Linwu County 临武县
- County
- Location in Hunan
- Coordinates: 25°16′34″N 112°33′50″E
- Country: People's Republic of China
- Province: Hunan
- Prefecture-level city: Chenzhou
- Time zone: UTC+8 (China Standard)
- Postal code: 4243XX

Linwu County (simplified Chinese: 临武县; traditional Chinese: 臨武縣; pinyin: Línwǔ Xiàn) is a county in Hunan Province, China. It is under the administration of the prefecture-level city of Chenzhou.

Located on the southern margin of the province, it is adjacent to the southwest of the city proper in Chenzhou. The county is bordered to the north by Guiyang and Jiahe Counties, to the northeast by Beihu District, to the east by Yizhang County, to the south by Lianzhou City of Guangdong, and to the west by Lanshan County. Linwu County covers an area of 1,383.06 km^{2} (534.00 sq mi). As of 2015, it had a registered population of 397,200 and a resident population of 399,900. The county has nine towns and four townships under its jurisdiction, and the county seat is Shunfeng Town (舜峰镇).

== Administrative divisions ==
9 towns

- Chujiang (楚江镇)
- Fenshi (汾市镇)
- Huaxiang (香花镇)
- Jinjiang (金江镇)
- Maishi (麦市镇)
- Nanqiang (南强镇)
- Shuidong (水东镇)
- Shunfeng (舜峰镇)
- Wushui (武水镇)

3 townships

- Huatang (花塘乡)
- Wanshui (万水乡)
- Zhennan (镇南乡)

1 ethnic township

- Yao Xishan (西山瑶族乡)

== Climate ==
Climate data for Linwu, elevation 292 m (958 ft), (1991–2020 normals, extremes 1981–present)
Month	Jan	Feb	Mar	Apr	May	Jun	Jul	Aug	Sep	Oct	Nov	Dec	Year
Record high °C (°F)	26.2 (79.2)	30.6 (87.1)	32.8 (91.0)	33.1 (91.6)	34.8 (94.6)	36.6 (97.9)	38.8 (101.8)	39.2 (102.6)	37.1 (98.8)	39.1 (102.4)	32.5 (90.5)	26.9 (80.4)	39.2 (102.6)
Mean daily maximum °C (°F)	11.1 (52.0)	14.0 (57.2)	17.4 (63.3)	23.4 (74.1)	27.5 (81.5)	30.2 (86.4)	32.7 (90.9)	32.3 (90.1)	29.3 (84.7)	24.8 (76.6)	19.8 (67.6)	13.9 (57.0)	23.0 (73.5)
Daily mean °C (°F)	6.9 (44.4)	9.5 (49.1)	13.2 (55.8)	18.9 (66.0)	23.0 (73.4)	26.0 (78.8)	27.8 (82.0)	27.1 (80.8)	24.2 (75.6)	19.6 (67.3)	14.3 (57.7)	8.9 (48.0)	18.3 (64.9)
Mean daily minimum °C (°F)	4.1 (39.4)	6.5 (43.7)	10.2 (50.4)	15.6 (60.1)	19.7 (67.5)	23.0 (73.4)	24.2 (75.6)	23.4 (74.1)	20.8 (69.4)	15.9 (60.6)	10.5 (50.9)	5.4 (41.7)	14.9 (58.9)
Record low °C (°F)	−4.3 (24.3)	−3.1 (26.4)	−2.0 (28.4)	2.6 (36.7)	7.9 (46.2)	12.7 (54.9)	19.0 (66.2)	18.4 (65.1)	11.7 (53.1)	2.8 (37.0)	−2.0 (28.4)	−5.5 (22.1)	−5.5 (22.1)
Average precipitation mm (inches)	72.2 (2.84)	73.8 (2.91)	147.9 (5.82)	180.7 (7.11)	216.7 (8.53)	255.6 (10.06)	135.8 (5.35)	141.7 (5.58)	74.2 (2.92)	60.7 (2.39)	71.6 (2.82)	55.4 (2.18)	1,486.3 (58.51)
Average precipitation days (≥ 0.1 mm)	13.1	13.6	18.7	16.6	17.3	18.4	13.0	14.6	9.1	6.6	8.3	9.4	158.7
Average snowy days	2.3	0.9	0.4	0	0	0	0	0	0	0	0	0.7	4.3
Average relative humidity (%)	79	79	82	80	80	81	76	79	78	75	76	74	78
Mean monthly sunshine hours	75.0	70.1	68.9	100.3	127.8	147.5	231.4	202.7	163.4	153.3	128.5	110.5	1,579.4
Percentage possible sunshine	22	22	18	26	31	36	55	51	45	43	40	34	35
Source: China Meteorological Administration all-time October record
