= Jiahe County =

Jiahe County 嘉禾县 Chiaho; Kiaho
- County
- Location in Hunan
- Coordinates: 25°35′13″N 112°22′08″E
- Country: People's Republic of China
- Province: Hunan
- Prefecture-level city: Chenzhou
- Seat: Zhuquan
- Time zone: UTC+8 (China Standard)
- Postal code: 4245XX

Jiahe County (simplified Chinese: 嘉禾县; traditional Chinese: 嘉禾縣; pinyin: Jiāhé Xiàn) is a county in Hunan Province, China. It is under the administration of Chenzhou prefecture-level city.

Located on the southern part of the province and the west of Chenzhou, the county is bordered to the northwest by Xintian County, to the east and northeast by Guiyang County, to the south by Linwu County, and to the west by Lanshan and Ningyuan Counties. Jiahe County covers an area of 699.05 km^{2} (269.90 sq mi), and as of 2015, it had a registered population of 423,900 and a resident population of 317,300. The county has nine towns and a township under its jurisdiction, with the county seat at Zhuquan (珠泉镇).

== Administrative divisions ==
9 towns

- Guangfa (广发镇)
- Jinping (晋屏镇)
- Longtan (龙潭镇)
- Shiqiao (石桥镇)
- Tangcun (塘村镇)
- Tanping (坦坪镇)
- Xinglang (行廊镇)
- Yuanjia (袁家镇)
- Zhuquan (珠泉镇)

1 township

- Puman (普满乡)

== Climate ==
Climate data for Jiahe, elevation 215 m (705 ft), (1991–2020 normals, extremes 1981–2010)
Month	Jan	Feb	Mar	Apr	May	Jun	Jul	Aug	Sep	Oct	Nov	Dec	Year
Record high °C (°F)	26.7 (80.1)	32.9 (91.2)	34.8 (94.6)	35.9 (96.6)	36.7 (98.1)	37.8 (100.0)	39.7 (103.5)	39.8 (103.6)	38.0 (100.4)	36.1 (97.0)	34.7 (94.5)	26.5 (79.7)	39.8 (103.6)
Mean daily maximum °C (°F)	10.6 (51.1)	13.8 (56.8)	17.6 (63.7)	24.0 (75.2)	28.1 (82.6)	31.0 (87.8)	33.9 (93.0)	33.2 (91.8)	29.6 (85.3)	24.7 (76.5)	19.4 (66.9)	13.4 (56.1)	23.3 (73.9)
Daily mean °C (°F)	6.8 (44.2)	9.5 (49.1)	13.2 (55.8)	19.2 (66.6)	23.4 (74.1)	26.6 (79.9)	28.8 (83.8)	28.0 (82.4)	24.8 (76.6)	19.7 (67.5)	14.3 (57.7)	8.7 (47.7)	18.6 (65.5)
Mean daily minimum °C (°F)	4.2 (39.6)	6.6 (43.9)	10.2 (50.4)	15.7 (60.3)	19.9 (67.8)	23.3 (73.9)	25.0 (77.0)	24.3 (75.7)	21.2 (70.2)	16.0 (60.8)	10.6 (51.1)	5.4 (41.7)	15.2 (59.4)
Record low °C (°F)	−4.2 (24.4)	−3.3 (26.1)	−0.5 (31.1)	2.4 (36.3)	10.0 (50.0)	13.8 (56.8)	18.3 (64.9)	17.9 (64.2)	12.6 (54.7)	3.4 (38.1)	−1.3 (29.7)	−6.2 (20.8)	−6.2 (20.8)
Average precipitation mm (inches)	75.7 (2.98)	87.6 (3.45)	147.6 (5.81)	176.6 (6.95)	202.2 (7.96)	209.1 (8.23)	124.9 (4.92)	149.5 (5.89)	72.0 (2.83)	66.0 (2.60)	74.7 (2.94)	54.7 (2.15)	1,440.6 (56.71)
Average precipitation days (≥ 0.1 mm)	14.4	14.0	18.2	16.5	16.5	16.5	11.4	13.6	10.4	9.4	10.4	10.6	161.9
Average snowy days	2.8	1.1	0.2	0	0	0	0	0	0	0	0	0.7	4.8
Average relative humidity (%)	80	80	81	78	78	79	72	75	77	76	77	76	77
Mean monthly sunshine hours	59.0	63.3	68.2	96.1	122.7	142.9	223.8	184.5	141.4	127.3	112.7	96.4	1,438.3
Percentage possible sunshine	18	20	18	25	30	35	54	46	39	36	35	30	32
Source: China Meteorological Administration
