= Xiangnan University =

Public college in Chenzhou, Hunan, China

- 湘南学院
- Motto: Moral, Erudition, Innovation, Practice
- Type: Public
- Established: 2003; 23 years ago
- President: Wang Xiaoping (王晓萍)
- Administrative staff: 1,178 (November 2019)
- Students: 19,532 (November 2019)
- Location: Chenzhou, Hunan, China; 25.46°N 113.02°E
- Campus: Rural
- Website: www.xnu.edu.cn

Chinese name
- Simplified Chinese: 湘南学院
- Traditional Chinese: 湘南學院
Transcriptions
Standard Mandarin
- Hanyu Pinyin: Xiāngnán Xuéyuàn

Xiangnan University (Chinese: 湘南学院; lit. 'Xiangnan College'; XNU) is a provincial public college in Suxian, Chenzhou, Hunan, China. Despite its English name, the institute has not been granted university status. The college is under the Hunan Provincial Department of Education.
