= Wugai Mountain Hunting Field =

Hunting area in Hunan, China

Wugai Mountain Hunting Field (Chinese: 五盖山国际狩猎场; pinyin: Wǔgàishān Guójì Shòulièchǎng) is located close to Chenzhou, in Hunan Province in China.

This park space is a hunting area where several different kinds of animals may be hunted. It has an area of 80 square kilometres.

The Wugai Mountain Hunting Field is one of the only two hunting fields in China. It is also the sole hunting-permitted area south of the Yangtze.

== Vegetation and Wildlife ==
Forests covers approximately 78% of the total area of the Wugai Mountain Hunting Field. A total of 130 species of animals have been recorded from this area, almost all of them existing in substantial numbers. Out of the 130, only 26 species are allowed to be hunted. Some of these include the sambar, wild boar, South China rabbit and badger.

== Climate ==
The Wugai Mountain Hunting Field has a mild climate and temperatures do not go to the extreme in either winter or summer, making it popular among holidayers, adventure seekers, and scientists alike.

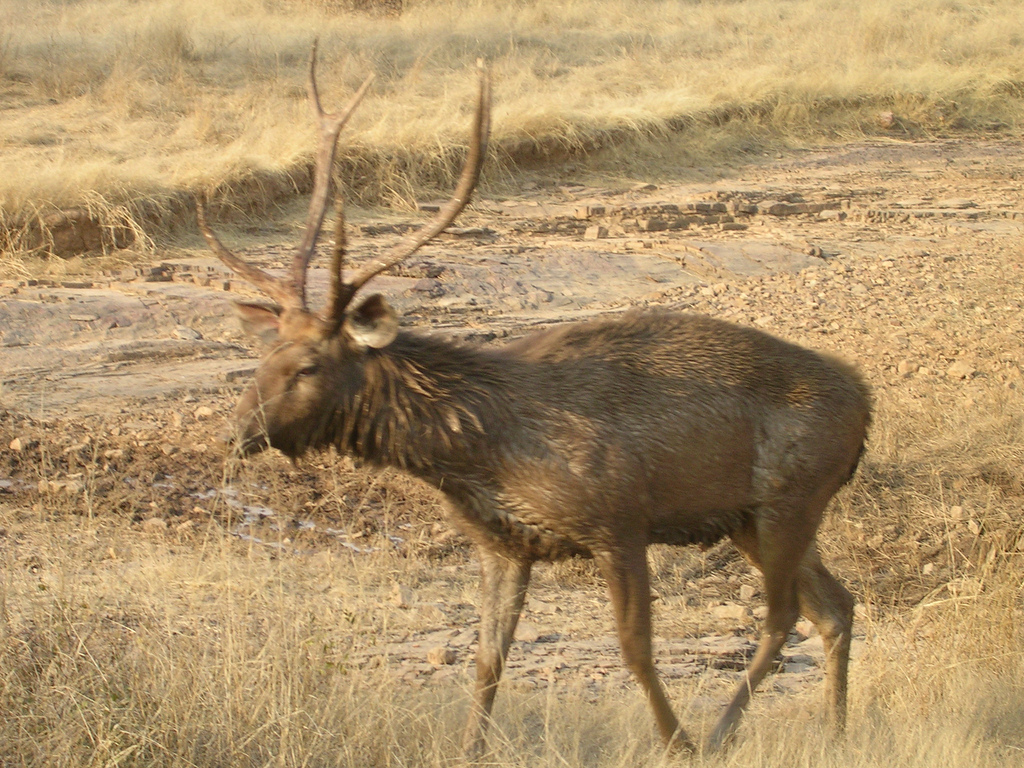
The Sambar deer, one of the species that can be hunted in the Wugai Mountain Hunting Field.

== See also ==
- Wugai Mountain
