= Dongjiang Lake =

- 东江湖 (Chinese)
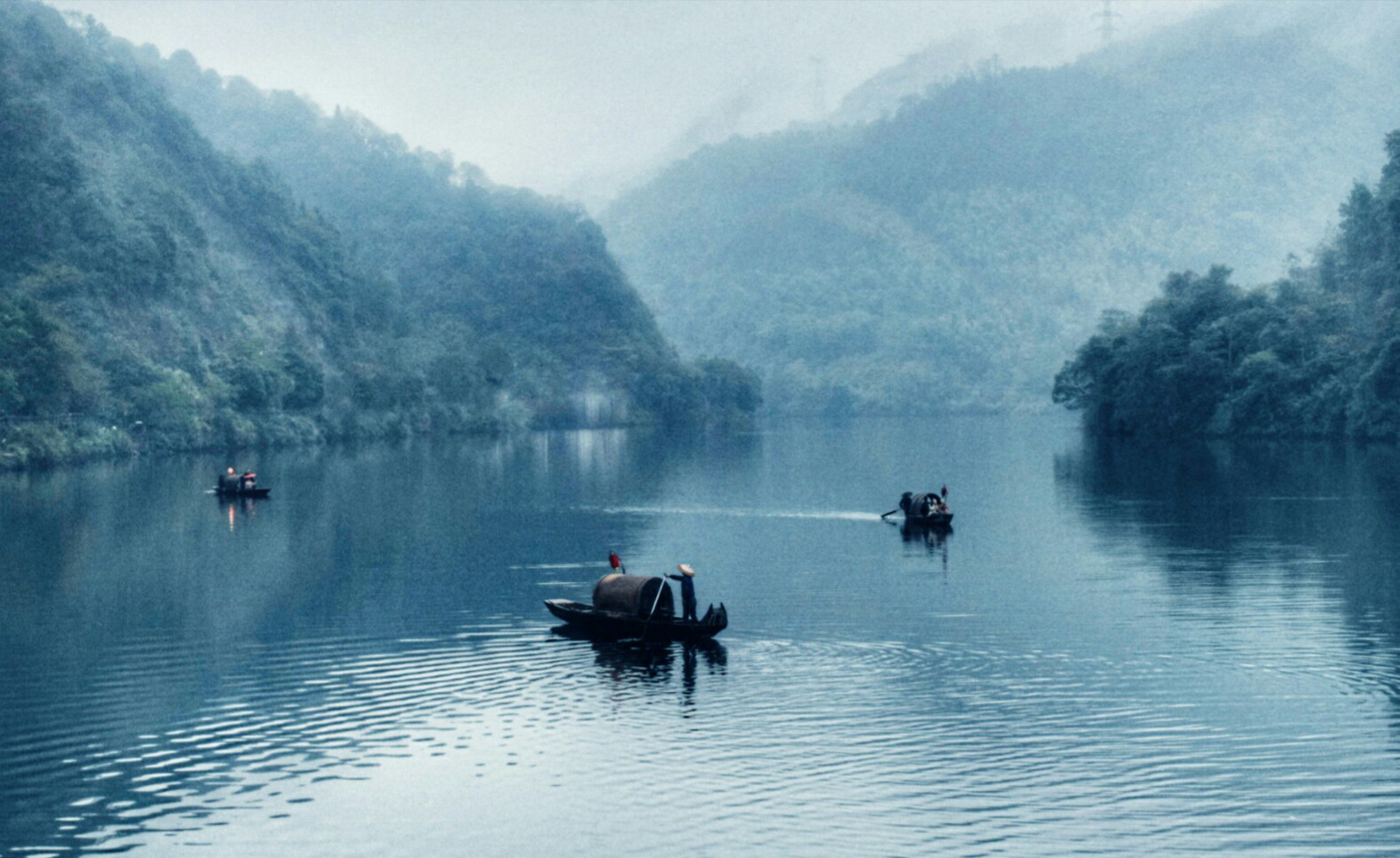
- Fishing boats on the Dongjiang Lake.

- Location in Hunan.
- Location: Dongjiang, Zixing, Hunan, China
- Coordinates: 25.83°N 113.36°E
- Type: Reservoir/ Freshwater lake
- Primary inflows: Lei River
- River sources: Lei River
- Built: 1958
- First flooded: 1992
- Surface area: 160 km^{2} (62 mi^{2})
- Water volume: 8.12 km^{3} (1.95 cu mi)

Dongjiang Lake (simplified Chinese: 东江湖; traditional Chinese: 東江湖; pinyin: Dōngjiāng Hú) is a reservoir located in Chenzhou city, southeast Hunan province, China. It is close to the Beijing-Guangzhou Railway and China National Highway 107. Situated 38 km away from the downtown area, it covers an area of 200 square kilometers. The Dongjiang scenic area includes the following: the Dongjiang Lake landscape, Dongjiang Reservoir Dam, Hougu Mountain Rainfall, Yongcui Gorge, and Swan Mountain National Forest Park. It is well known in China as a place for tourism, vacation, and rehabilitation.

== Attractions ==
=== Dongjiang Reservoir Dam ===
Dongjiang Reservoir Dam was constructed between 1958 and 1992 off and on, and supports a 500 MW hydroelectric power. This hyperbolic arch dam is Chinese designed and built. When the dike locks are opened, the green lake water dashes down to the gorge and the water is divided into thousands of small water drops, which forms a canvas of fog, like the silvery silk.

=== Dongjiang Lake ===
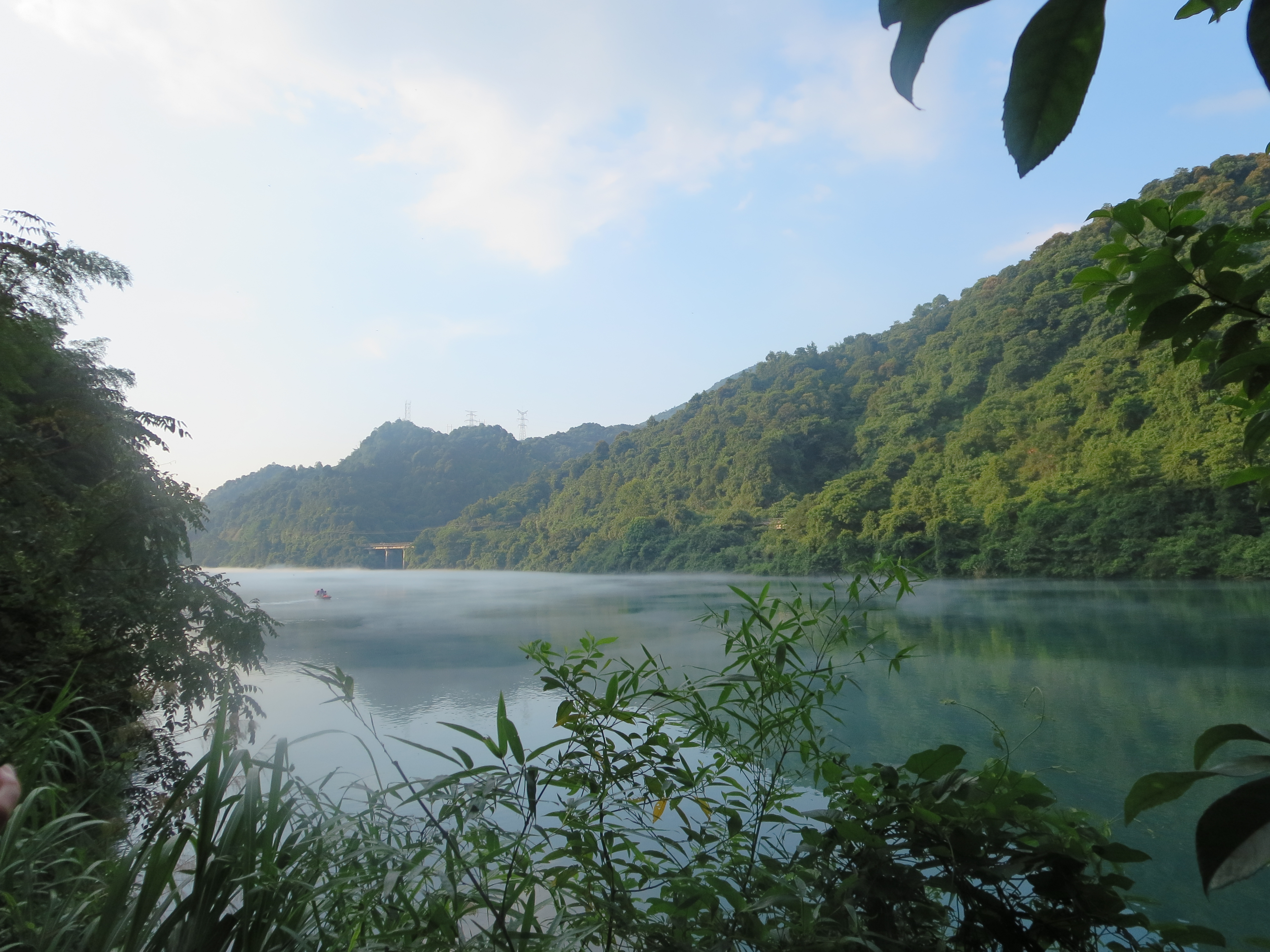
Fog can be seen on top of Dongjiang Lake

Dongjiang lake is the water reservation reservoir, which is also one of the key national energy projects. The lake occupies a surface width of 160 square kilometers and has a water storage of 81.2 billion cubic meters, which is honored as "South Dongting Lake". Furthermore, the Dongjiang Lake is not only the biggest artificial lake in middle and southern area of China but also one of training base for water sports.

=== Dongjiang white-water rafting ===
Dongjiang White-Water Rafting is one of the national 5A tourist attractions—the highest level of Tourist Attraction Rating Categories of China. The rafting area is located in the region of Zheshui River which belongs to the upstream of Dongjiang Lake. Dongjiang white-water rafting is not only famous for its plenty of shoals, rapids and high drop, but also known for its strange stones, vegetation diversity along the river banks. So people can experience an feeling of thrill. However, many accidents also happened over the past years. Sometimes the boats will capsize because of the rapids. From the time when this program was opened in 1995, roughly speaking, it was reported by totally about 100 TVs such as CCTV-1 and CCTV-4, newspapers and magazines. And also, it is also confirmed as the training and competition location for white-water rafting.

=== Hougu Mountain waterfalls ===
The waterfalls are situated on the southwest of the dam and are composed by two waterfalls which are a hundred meters apart. The rainfall in the west is about 20 meters high while the other in the south is more than 200 meters.

=== Tokyo Stockade ===
Tokyo Stockade is close to the Butian village, which is one of Chinese revolutionary commemoration sites. In 1928, Zhu De and Chen Yi (general) led their army here and celebrated one-year anniversary of the August 1 Nanchang Uprising.

=== Bailang Scenic Area ===
Close to Swan Mountain National Forest Park and Xingning Town is Bailang Scenic Area, located in Bailang County, Hunan. In Bailang Scenic Area are the “Five Islands One Village” attractions, which include the Folk Village, Snake Island, Monkey Island, Crocodile Island, and Bird Island. In the Folk Village are buildings with architectural styles belonging to several ethnic groups in China. In these islands, people get a chance to know more knowledge about different animals' habits as well as enjoying the shows.

=== Swan Mountain National Forest Park ===
The name of this national forest park is closely connected with a Chinese folklore. It is said that many years ago, the people here was hit by the long drought, and then someday a swan flew to this area and perched on the mountaintop. After three days, the rain fell in torrents. People thought that it was because of the swan and in order to express their gratitude, people built a temple. Later the local people directly called the mountain Swan Mountain. Now if tourists go to Swan Mountain, they can still find the historical site of this temple. The Swan Mountain National Forest Park is in the northeast of Dongjiang Lake, which covers an area of hundreds of thousands of square kilometers. Its highest point is over 1000 meters. Here, tourists can see the largest Cathaya argyrophylla phytocommunity in the world, the highest bridge in Hunan province called Swan Mountain Bridge, Schwanenteich and Tangshi hotspring.

== Environmental protection ==
=== Domestic pollution ===
By on-the-spot investigation and document searching, there are 50 thousand people living in the lake region, and every year about 913 thousand tons of domestic sewage is emitted. Besides, there are few sewage treatment plants, so mostly the sewage produced by restaurant industry is still directly emitted into the lake.

=== Pollution caused by mining ===
Chenzhou is rich in minerals such as gold, coal, nonferrous metal. And because the veins are very long, minerals have wide distribution areas and scatter in different mountains, it is somewhat difficult for people to manage it. Thus, disordered mining has become a serious problem, which destroys the ecological balance.

=== Tourism pollution ===
With the rapid development of the environmental tourism, there are more and more people coming to Dongjiang Lake, which has also put a lot of pressure on the regional protection. Another crucial point is that with the increasing tourists, more and more restaurants have been opening, which worsens water pollution.

== Ticket ==
According to the Chenzhou Municipal Price Bureau, the current price schedule (as of January 2015) is as follows:

Routes	Touring items	Price	Ships and boats	Total price
Route A	Hougu Mountain Rainfalls; Xiao Dongjiang in the Foggy day; Dongjiang Reservoir Dam; Longjing Valley; Photo Studio; Renwen Xiaoxiang Pavilion; Rare Stone Pavilion;	80	0	20
Route B	Hougu Mountain Rainfalls; Xiao Dongjiang in the Foggy day; Dongjiang Reservoir Dam; Longjing Valley; Photo Studio; Renwen Xiaoxiang Pavilion; Rare Stone Pavilion; Doushuai Karst Cave;	100	24	134
Route C	Hougu Mountain Rainfalls; Xiao Dongjiang in the Foggy day; Dongjiang Reservoir Dam; Longjing Valley; Huangcao Town; Dongjiang White-water Rafting;	248	70	318
Island hopping	Hougu Mountain Rainfalls; Xiao Dongjiang in the Foggy day; Dongjiang Reservoir Dam; Longjing Valley; Dongjiang Lake	80	120	200

== Specialty food and crafts ==
Dog Brain Gong Cha is a kind of special tea in this area. Its name is closely related to a Chinese folklore. When mythical Yan Emperor together with his dog came to this area, Yan Emperor picked and ate the fruit. However, the fruit is poisonous, the fruit put Yan Emperor in a coma. His dog saved his life by continuously dragging him to the foot of the mountain for several days. But his dog tired to death. Yan emperor also came to himself due to the dew which gathered on the leaves of the Camellia sinensis. Yan Emperor in gratitude named this mountain Dog Brain Mountain. Later, the local farmer developed a habit of using Dog Brain tea as a tribute to the emperors on the later dynasties.

- Chuyun Fairy Tea

Chuyun Fairy Tea is a kind of high-quality black tea. In 2013, Chuyun Fairy Tea produced in Dongjiang area won the special prize in the China Tea Cup held by China Tea Science Society.

- Xianlong Tea
- Dongjiang Maojian Tea
- Dongjiang Yinhao Tea

=== Dongjiang fish ===
Dongjiang fish is one of the four special products in Chenzhou. It is of high quality because of the water in Dongjiang Lake. The temperature of the water is 8-12 °C. Fish which grows in relatively cold water contains more protein and amino acid. Thus it contains higher nutrition.

- Icefish
- Mandarin fish
- Milter
- Crucian
- Small dried fish

=== Fruit ===
- Tangerine
- Valencia orange
- Ponkan—— another kind of tangerine
- Navel orange
- And many other kinds of seasonal fruit

=== Bamboo products ===
- Bamboo curtain
- Figure-like bamboo carving
- Bamboo penholder
- Bamboo wall hanging
- Bamboo toy
- Bamboo chopsticks
