= Zhuquan =

Town in Jiahe County, Hunan, China

Coordinates: 25°35′17″N 112°22′05″E

Zhuquan Town (Chinese: 珠泉镇; pinyin: Zhūquán Zhèn) is a town and the county seat in the south western Jiahe County, Hunan, China. The town was reformed through the amalgamation of Panjiang Township (Chinese: 盘江乡) and 12 villages of the former Zhuquan Town on November 27, 2015. It has an area of 116 km^{2} (45 sq mi) with a population of 107,000 (as of 2015 end), its seat is at North Renmin Rd. (Chinese: 人民北路)
