= Guidong County =

Guidong County 桂东县 Kweitung
- County
- Location of the seat in Hunan
- Coordinates: 26°04′37″N 113°56′38″E
- Country: People's Republic of China
- Province: Hunan
- Prefecture-level city: Chenzhou
- Seat: Oujiang
- Time zone: UTC+8 (China Standard)
- Postal code: 4235XX

Guidong County (simplified Chinese: 桂东县; traditional Chinese: 桂東縣; pinyin: Guìdōng Xiàn) is a county in Hunan Province, China, bordering Jiangxi province to the east. It is under the administration of Chenzhou prefecture-level City.

Located on the southeastern margin of the province, it is the easternmost county-level division of Chenzhou City. The county is bordered to the north by Yanling County, to the west by Zixing City, to the south by Rucheng County, and to the east by Suichuan, Shangyou and Chongyi Counties of Jiangxi. Guidong County covers an area of 1,451.6 km^{2} (560.5 sq mi), and as of 2015, it had a permanent resident population of 232,700. The county has seven towns and four townships under its jurisdiction, and the county seat is Oujiang (沤江镇).

== Administrative divisions ==
7 towns

- Datang (大塘镇)
- Oujiang (沤江镇)
- Pule (普乐镇)
- Qingquan (清泉镇)
- Shatian (沙田镇)
- Sidu (四都镇)
- Zhaiqian (寨前镇)

4 townships

- Dongluo (东洛乡)
- Qiaotou (桥头乡)
- Qingshan (青山乡)
- Xinfang (新坊乡)

== Climate ==
Guidong County belongs to the subtropical monsoon humid climate zone, no summer heat, no winter cold, warm and humid, four seasons. In spring, the southeast wind into the cold and warm air masses fronts in the territory of the confrontation hovering, insufficient light, cloudy temperature and rain. In summer, controlled by the low latitude ocean warm and humid air masses, high temperature and rainy, prevailing south wind. However, the territory is high in altitude, mountainous, and has good vegetation, so the summer dollar heat. Under the influence of typhoons, there are sometimes torrential rains. In autumn, the cold air invasion, the temperature drops, cold air activity is frequent, less rain, often high autumn weather. Occasionally, it is affected by typhoons and there are heavy rainfalls from time to time. In winter, under the control of dry and cold air masses from the north, there are often cold currents intruding from Siberia and the Mongolian Plateau, but because of the high mountains, the terrain is tilted to the south, and thus the winter is not too cold.

Climate data for Guidong, elevation 836 m (2,743 ft), (1991–2020 normals, extremes 1981–2010)
Month	Jan	Feb	Mar	Apr	May	Jun	Jul	Aug	Sep	Oct	Nov	Dec	Year
Record high °C (°F)	23.7 (74.7)	26.8 (80.2)	30.0 (86.0)	31.3 (88.3)	31.8 (89.2)	33.5 (92.3)	35.7 (96.3)	36.7 (98.1)	34.4 (93.9)	32.4 (90.3)	30.0 (86.0)	24.5 (76.1)	36.7 (98.1)
Mean daily maximum °C (°F)	11.7 (53.1)	13.9 (57.0)	16.6 (61.9)	21.8 (71.2)	25.4 (77.7)	27.6 (81.7)	29.9 (85.8)	29.5 (85.1)	27.0 (80.6)	23.4 (74.1)	19.3 (66.7)	14.2 (57.6)	21.7 (71.0)
Daily mean °C (°F)	6.1 (43.0)	8.5 (47.3)	11.8 (53.2)	16.7 (62.1)	20.5 (68.9)	23.1 (73.6)	24.5 (76.1)	23.6 (74.5)	21.2 (70.2)	17.0 (62.6)	12.3 (54.1)	7.3 (45.1)	16.1 (60.9)
Mean daily minimum °C (°F)	2.6 (36.7)	4.9 (40.8)	8.3 (46.9)	13.1 (55.6)	17.0 (62.6)	20.1 (68.2)	20.9 (69.6)	20.2 (68.4)	17.6 (63.7)	12.9 (55.2)	7.9 (46.2)	3.2 (37.8)	12.4 (54.3)
Record low °C (°F)	−6.7 (19.9)	−6.4 (20.5)	−5.2 (22.6)	−0.4 (31.3)	5.6 (42.1)	8.1 (46.6)	15.0 (59.0)	13.1 (55.6)	7.6 (45.7)	−0.7 (30.7)	−4.4 (24.1)	−9.5 (14.9)	−9.5 (14.9)
Average precipitation mm (inches)	77.1 (3.04)	100.1 (3.94)	175.6 (6.91)	171.0 (6.73)	207.7 (8.18)	266.4 (10.49)	186.6 (7.35)	250.9 (9.88)	132.7 (5.22)	59.3 (2.33)	76.5 (3.01)	60.1 (2.37)	1,764 (69.45)
Average precipitation days (≥ 0.1 mm)	13.9	14.4	20.2	17.9	19.8	20.2	16.3	19.8	14.2	8.0	9.7	9.5	183.9
Average snowy days	2.7	1.8	0.4	0	0	0	0	0	0	0	0.1	0.8	5.8
Average relative humidity (%)	83	83	85	82	83	84	82	85	84	81	80	79	83
Mean monthly sunshine hours	84.4	76.0	69.5	92.0	103.1	103.8	172.2	149.0	132.8	146.7	138.1	127.9	1,395.5
Percentage possible sunshine	25	24	19	24	25	25	41	37	36	41	43	39	32
Source: China Meteorological Administration
