= Chenzhou Beihu Airport =

Chenzhou Beihu Airport 郴州北湖机场
- IATA: HCZ; ICAO: ZGCZ

Summary
- Airport type: Public
- Serves: Chenzhou, Hunan, China
- Location: Huatang, Beihu District
- Opened: 16 September 2021
- Coordinates: 25°45′02″N 112°50′45″E

Map
- Location of airport in Hunan

Runways
Direction	Length		Surface
Direction	m	ft	Surface
07/25	2,600	8,530

Statistics (2025)
- Passengers: 455,579
- Aircraft movements: 3,865
- Cargo (metric tons): 0.8

Chenzhou Beihu Airport (IATA: HCZ, ICAO: ZGCZ) is an airport serving Chenzhou city in Hunan province, China. Its location in Tashui Village, Huatang Town, Beihu District was approved by the Civil Aviation Administration of China in January 2015. The airport construction is being overseen by the Hunan Airport Authority. Chenzhou Beihu Airport will feature a 2600m runway, a terminal with a handling capacity for 550,000 passengers and 3,000 tonnes per annum. The airport formally opened on September 16, 2021.

== History ==
In 2011, the Chenzhou Beihu Airport project was included in the "12th Five-Year Plan for the Development of Civil Aviation in China" by the Civil Aviation Administration of China. It took ten years from the start of the feasibility study to the commencement of construction and the completion of the airport.

At the end of 2012, the Chenzhou government compiled the "Chenzhou Airport Site Selection Report of Hunan Province". In July 2013, the Chenzhou Airport Site Selection Report was completed and passed the preliminary evaluation by experts organized by the Civil Aviation Administration of Central and Southern China.

On January 13, 2015, the site selection for an airport located in Tashui Village, Huatang Town, Beihu District, Chenzhou City, was officially approved, and the airport was named "Chenzhou Beihu Airport."

On January 4, 2019, the airport project officially commenced construction, with a total investment of 2.13 billion yuan and a land area of 3,100 mu (206.67 hectares).

The first flight calibration was conducted in March 2021. On May 21, 2021, Chenzhou Beihu Airport completed its official test flight, and on June 18, local authorities officially conducted its acceptance inspection. The apron of the airport was equipped with 6 Category C aircraft stands and a 2,600-meter-long, 45-meter-wide runway.

On September 16, 2021, Chenzhou Beihu Airport officially opened to traffic. The first route was China United Airlines flight KN5799, operated by a Boeing B737-800, arriving from Beijing Daxing Airport.

Chenzhou Beihu Airport
- Simplified Chinese: 郴州北湖机场
- Traditional Chinese: 郴州北湖機場
Transcriptions
Standard Mandarin
- Hanyu Pinyin: Chēnzhōu Běihú Jīchǎng

== Airlines and destinations ==
Airlines	Destinations
Beijing Capital Airlines	Haikou, Nanjing, Xi'an
China United Airlines	Beijing–Daxing
Juneyao Air	Shanghai–Pudong
West Air	Chongqing

== See also ==
- List of airports in China
- List of the busiest airports in China
