= Chishi Bridge =

Chishi Bridge 赤石大桥
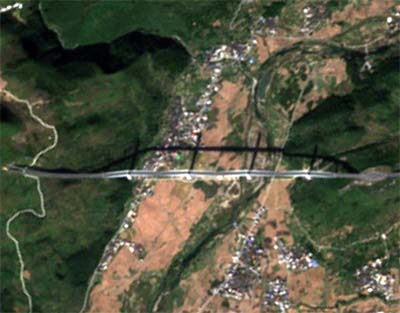
- Chishi bridge viewed by Sentinel-2 satellite
- Coordinates: 25.532778°N 113.186944°E
- Carries: G76 Xiamen–Chengdu Expressway
- Crosses: Qingtou River
- Locale: Chishi Township, Yizhang County, Hunan Province, China

Characteristics
- Design: Cable-stayed bridge
- Total length: 2,270 metres (7,450 ft)
- Width: 28 metres (92 ft)
- Height: 286.63 metres (940.4 ft)
- Longest span: 380 metres (1,250 ft)
- No. of spans: 165+3×380+165
- Clearance below: 183 metres (600 ft)

History
- Designer: Hunan Provincial Communications Planning Survey and Design Institute
- Construction start: 28 March 2010
- Opened: 28 October 2016

Statistics
- Toll: 20 yuan (USD$ 3)

Location
- Interactive map of Chishi Bridge

The Chishi Bridge (Chinese: 赤石大桥) is a bridge carrying the G76 Xiamen–Chengdu Expressway over a deep valley. At 380 metres (1,250 ft) the longest span is 38 metres (125 ft) longer than France's Millau Viaduct, which has a similar structure, but is longer and higher than the Chishi Bridge.

On June 10, 2017, The New York Times offered the Chishi Bridge as an example of one of China's many troubled bridge projects. They reported that the bridge's construction was significantly delayed, and went fifty percent over budget. The total cost of the project was US$300 million.
