= Tangdong =

Subdistrict of Zixing, Hunan, China

Coordinates: 25°58′33″N 113°13′30″E

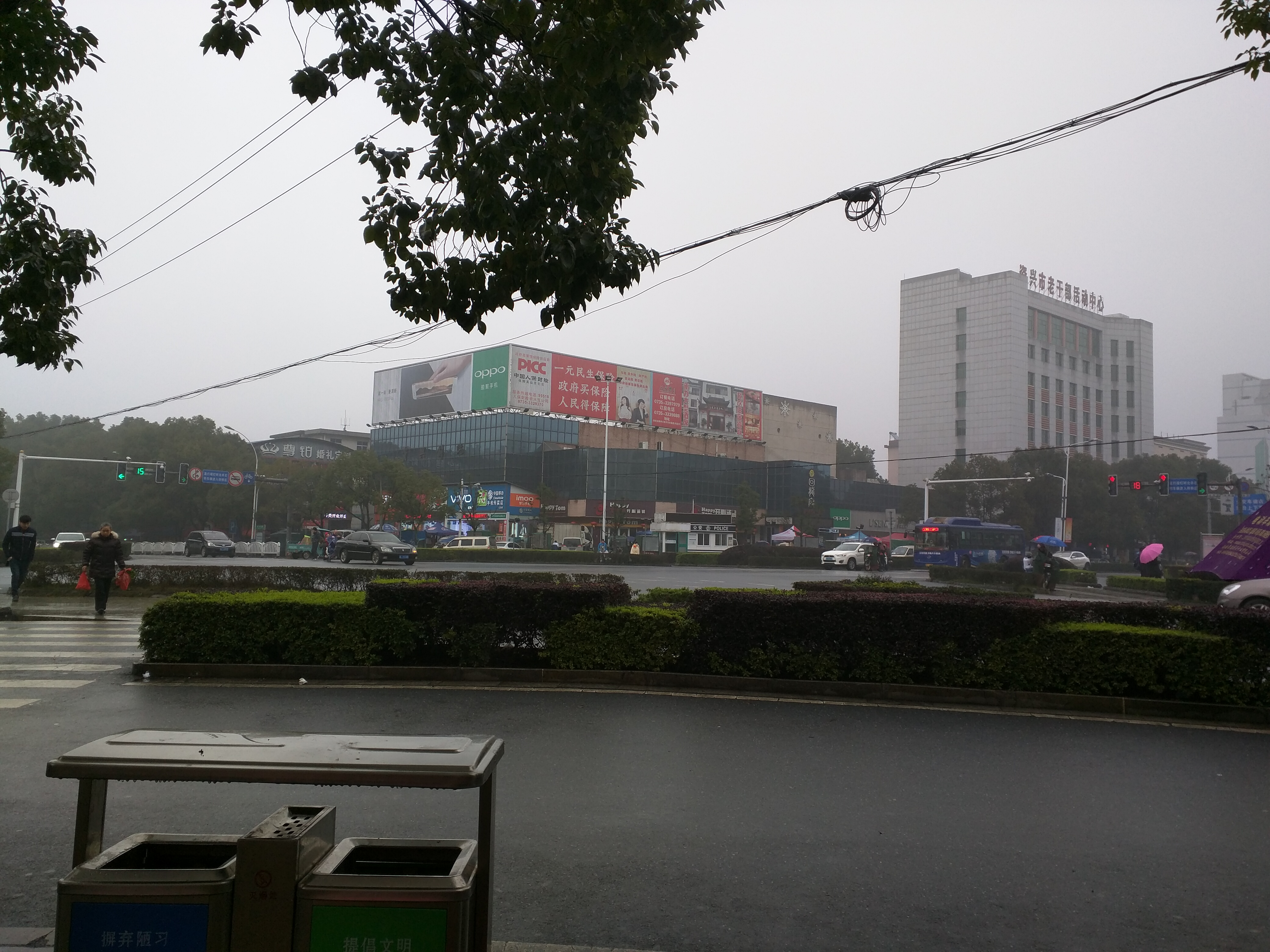
The intersection of Xinghua Road (left/north) and Yang'an Road (right/east) in Tangdong Subdistrict

Tangdong Subdistrict (Chinese: 唐洞街道; pinyin: Tángdòng Jiēdào) is a subdistrict and the seat of Zixing City in Hunan, China. The subdistrict was formed in 1989 and merged the former Chengshui Town (Chinese: 程水镇) to it in 2015. It has an area of 153.87 km^{2} (59.41 sq mi) with a population of 81,100 (as of 2015). Its seat is at Wenfenglu Community (Chinese: 文锋路社区).

== See also ==
- List of township-level divisions of Hunan
