= Yizhang County =

Yizhang County 宜章县 Ichang
- County
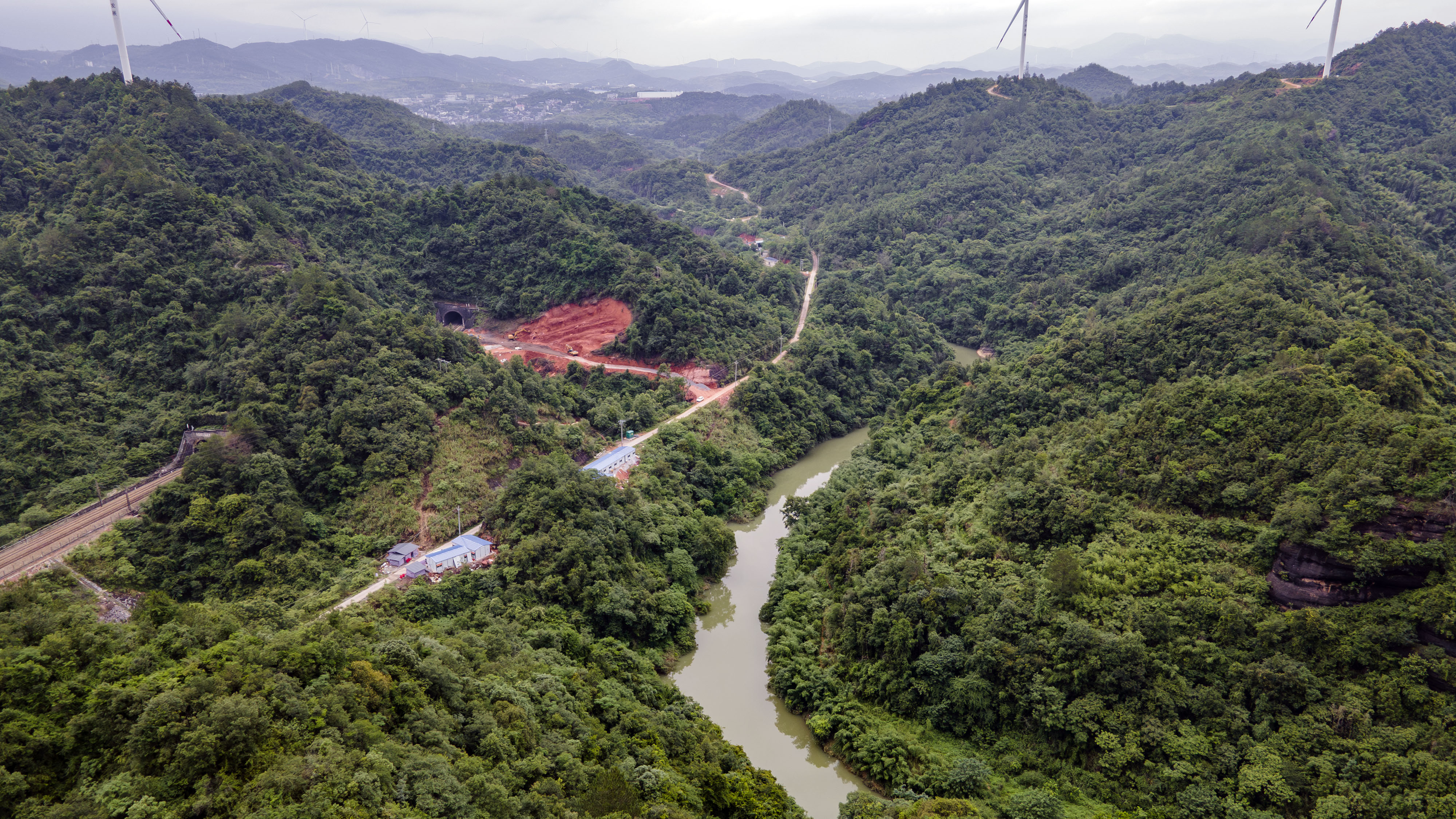

- Location in Hunan
- Coordinates: 25°23′53″N 112°56′53″E
- Country: People's Republic of China
- Province: Hunan
- Prefecture-level city: Chenzhou
- Time zone: UTC+8 (China Standard)
- Postal code: 4242XX

Yizhang County (simplified Chinese: 宜章县; traditional Chinese: 宜章縣; pinyin: Yízhāng Xiàn) is a county in Hunan Province, China, it is under the administration of the prefecture-level city of Chenzhou. Yizhang County covers 2,142.7 km^{2} (827.3 sq mi). As of 2015, it had a registered population of 644,300 and a resident population of 589,400.

== Location ==
Located on the southern margin of the province, it is adjacent to the south of the city proper in Chenzhou, and near the northern border of Guangdong. The county borders to the north by Zixing City, Suxian and Beihu Districts, to the west by Linwu County, Lianzhou City of Guangdong, to the south and the southeast by Yangshan, Ruyuan Counties and Lechang City of Guangdong and Rucheng County.

== Administration ==
The county has 14 towns and 5 townships under its jurisdiction. The county seat is Yuxi Town (玉溪镇).

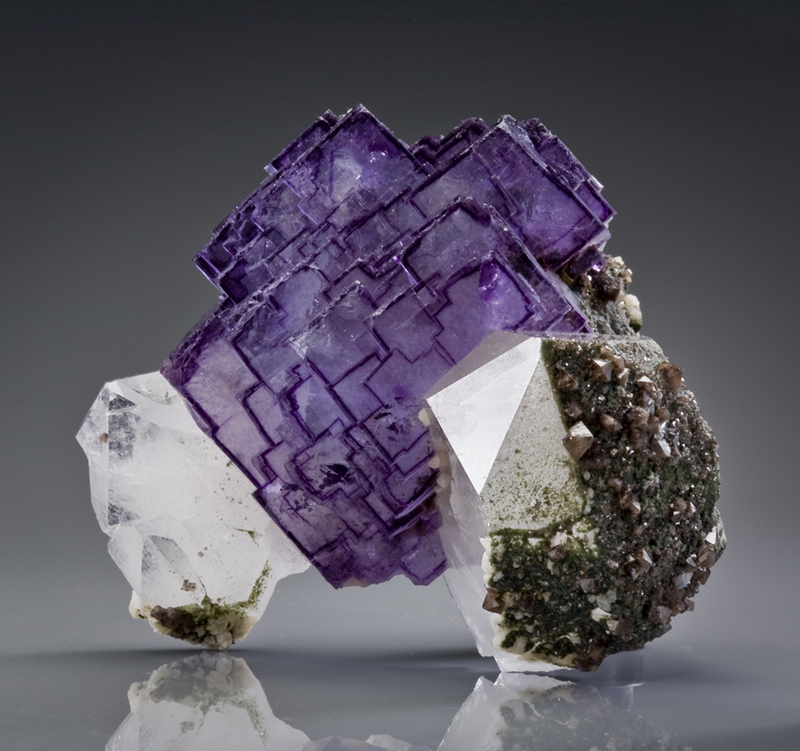
Fluorite mineral specimen from the Yaogangxian Mine, Yizhang County.

14 towns

- Baishidu (白石渡镇)
- Bali (笆篱镇)
- Huangsha (黄沙镇)
- Litian (里田镇)
- Liyuan (栗源镇)
- Meitian (梅田镇)
- Tiantang (天塘镇)
- Wuling (五岭镇)
- Yangmeishan (杨梅山镇)
- Yanquan (岩泉镇)
- Yaogangxian (瑶岗仙镇)
- Yiliu (一六镇)
- Yingchun (迎春镇)
- Yuxi (玉溪镇)

4 townships

- Changcun (长村乡)
- Chishi (赤石乡)
- Guanxi (关溪乡)
- Jiangshui (浆水乡)

1 ethnic township

- Yao Mangshan (莽山瑶族乡)

== History ==
In early 1928 Zhu De's troops, survivors of the Nanchang Uprising, Little Long March and Battle of Shantou, found refuge here with the local warlord. Chen Yi was with him; neither dared reveal his identity at the time. It was from here that a rested and bolstered communist column marched to the Jinggangshan Mountains in April to join the hold-outs from another uprising.

== County town ==
The county town is at the border between Hunan and Guangdong. The national highway from Guangzhou to Beijing passes through the middle of the town.

== Environment ==
A beautiful tourist park is Mangshan Mountain National Forest Park. The 1902-meter peak of Shikengkong (石坑崆), on the interprovincial border, stands some 50 km south of the county town.

Mangshan pitviper and Mangshan horned toad have been described as new species to science from specimens collected from Mangshan (Mount Mang).

== Climate ==
Climate data for Yizhang, elevation 223 m (732 ft), (1991–2020 normals, extremes 1981–2010)
Month	Jan	Feb	Mar	Apr	May	Jun	Jul	Aug	Sep	Oct	Nov	Dec	Year
Record high °C (°F)	26.5 (79.7)	30.8 (87.4)	33.0 (91.4)	34.6 (94.3)	35.3 (95.5)	37.0 (98.6)	41.0 (105.8)	40.2 (104.4)	37.5 (99.5)	37.2 (99.0)	32.9 (91.2)	27.1 (80.8)	41.0 (105.8)
Mean daily maximum °C (°F)	11.8 (53.2)	14.6 (58.3)	17.8 (64.0)	24.1 (75.4)	28.3 (82.9)	31.2 (88.2)	33.8 (92.8)	33.3 (91.9)	30.4 (86.7)	25.9 (78.6)	20.7 (69.3)	14.7 (58.5)	23.9 (75.0)
Daily mean °C (°F)	7.4 (45.3)	9.9 (49.8)	13.5 (56.3)	19.2 (66.6)	23.5 (74.3)	26.6 (79.9)	28.5 (83.3)	27.9 (82.2)	25.2 (77.4)	20.4 (68.7)	15.0 (59.0)	9.4 (48.9)	18.9 (66.0)
Mean daily minimum °C (°F)	4.6 (40.3)	7.0 (44.6)	10.6 (51.1)	15.9 (60.6)	20.2 (68.4)	23.4 (74.1)	24.8 (76.6)	24.3 (75.7)	21.6 (70.9)	16.6 (61.9)	11.1 (52.0)	5.9 (42.6)	15.5 (59.9)
Record low °C (°F)	−3.9 (25.0)	−2.9 (26.8)	−1.5 (29.3)	3.3 (37.9)	8.9 (48.0)	13.7 (56.7)	18.7 (65.7)	18.6 (65.5)	13.2 (55.8)	3.7 (38.7)	−0.4 (31.3)	−7.4 (18.7)	−7.4 (18.7)
Average precipitation mm (inches)	78.1 (3.07)	82.2 (3.24)	154.0 (6.06)	181.9 (7.16)	203.0 (7.99)	236.6 (9.31)	137.9 (5.43)	154.7 (6.09)	62.3 (2.45)	55.6 (2.19)	69.4 (2.73)	53.2 (2.09)	1,468.9 (57.81)
Average precipitation days (≥ 0.1 mm)	13.5	13.3	18.5	17.2	17.8	17.2	12.5	14.3	8.7	7.1	8.2	9.3	157.6
Average snowy days	1.9	0.7	0.3	0	0	0	0	0	0	0	0	0.5	3.4
Average relative humidity (%)	80	80	83	81	81	81	76	78	76	74	76	76	79
Mean monthly sunshine hours	62.3	58.4	55.8	81.8	107.4	124.6	209.1	186.4	154.8	142.1	118.5	102.8	1,404
Percentage possible sunshine	19	18	15	21	26	31	50	47	42	40	37	32	32
Source: China Meteorological Administration

== See also ==
- Chishi Bridge
