= Shunfeng, Linwu =

Town in Hunan, China

Coordinates: 25°16′41″N 112°33′7″E

Shunfeng Town (Chinese: 舜峰镇; pinyin: Shùnfēng Zhèn) is a town and the county seat in the southern Linwu County, Hunan, China. The town was reformed through the amalgamation of Shuangxi Township (Chinese: 双溪乡) and the former Shunfeng Town on November 27, 2015. Shunfeng is located in the south of Linwu County, it is bordered by Huatang Township (Chinese: 花塘乡) to the north, Wushui Town (Chinese: 武水镇) to the northeast, Nanqiang Town (Chinese: 南强镇) to the southeast and south, Lianzhou City of Guangdong to the southwest, and Xishan Yao Township (Chinese: 西山瑶族乡) to the west and northwest. It has an area of 102.35 km^{2} (39.52 sq mi) with a population of 77,800 (as of 2015 end). Its seat is at Linwu Avenue (Chinese: 临武大道).
