= Oujiang, Hunan =

Town in Guidong County, Hunan, China

Coordinates: 26°04′52″N 113°56′57″E

Oujiang Town (Chinese: 沤江镇; pinyin: Ōujiāng Zhèn) is a town and the county seat of Guidong County in Hunan, China. The town was formed through the amalgamation of Sandong Township (Chinese: 三洞乡), Huangdong Township (Chinese: 黄洞乡) and Chengguan Town (Chinese: 城关镇) in 2012; on November 27, 2015, Hankou Township (Chinese: 寒口乡) and Zengkou Township (Chinese: 增口乡) were merged to the town. It has an area of 328.12 km^{2} (126.69 sq mi) with a population of 69,539 (as of 2010 census). Its seat is at Maoliu Village (Chinese: 茅柳村).
