= Beihu, Chenzhou =

Beihu 北湖区
- District
- Location in Hunan
- Coordinates: 25°47′48″N 113°02′00″E
- Country: China
- Province: Hunan
- Prefecture-level city: Chenzhou
- District seat: Luoxian Subdistrict

Area
  - Total: 818.53 km^{2} (316.04 sq mi)

Population (2020 census)
  - Total: 568,778
  - Density: 694.88/km^{2} (1,799.7/sq mi)
- Time zone: UTC+8 (China Standard)
- Website: www.czbeihu.gov.cn

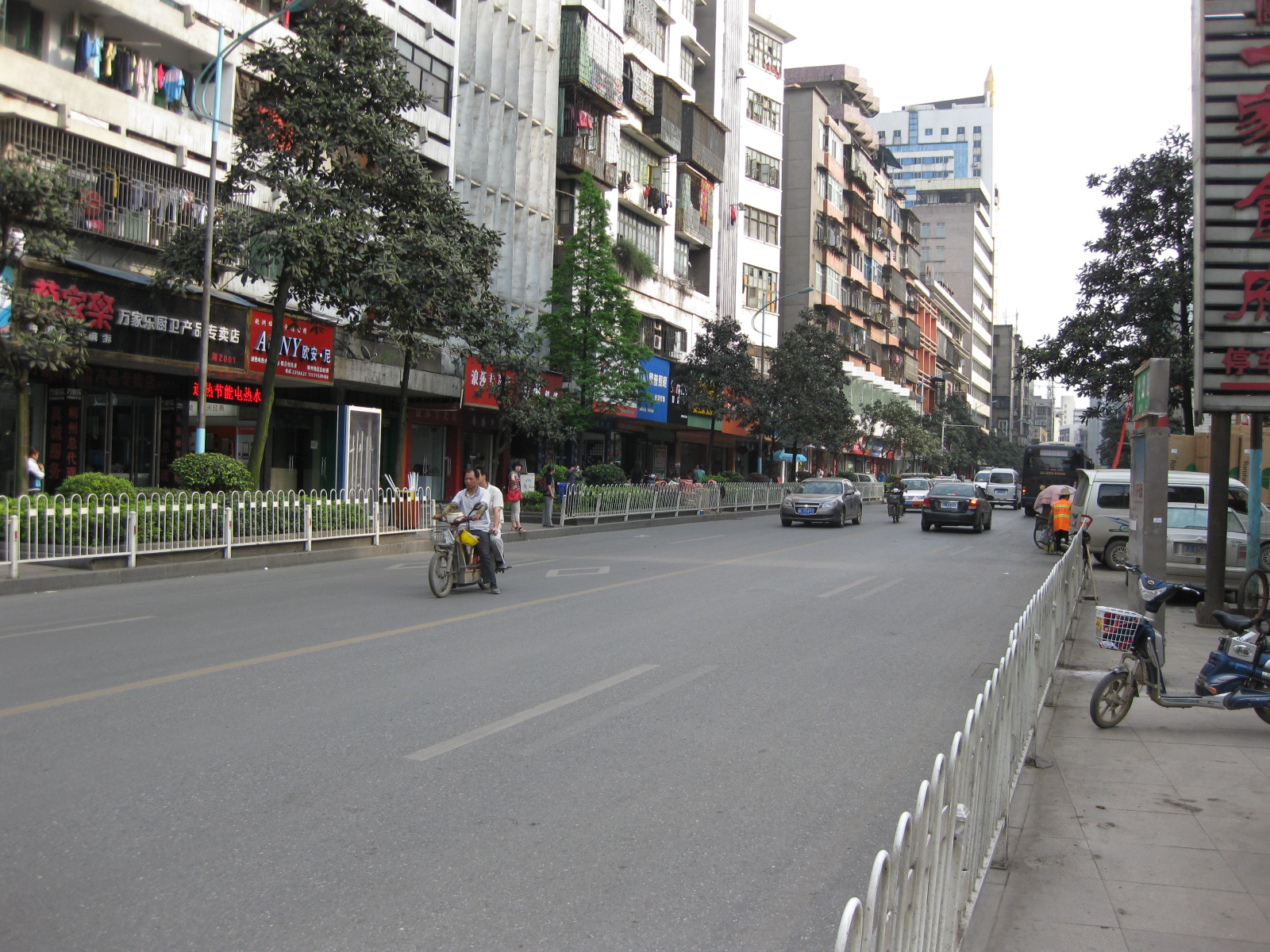
Beihu Road, Chenzhou

Beihu District (simplified Chinese: 北湖区; traditional Chinese: 北湖區; pinyin: Běihú Qū) is one of two urban districts in Chenzhou Prefecture-level City, Hunan province, China.

The district is located in the southwestern part of the city proper. It is bordered to the northeast by Suxian District, to the southeast by Yizhang County, to the south by Linwu County, and to the west and northwest by Guiyang County. Beihu District covers an area of 830.15 km^{2} (320.52 sq mi), and as of 2015, it had a registered population of 389,200 and a permanent resident population of 429,900. The district has eight subdistricts, two towns and two townships under its jurisdiction. The government seat is Luoxian Subdistrict (骆仙街道).

== Administrative divisions ==
Beihu has 10 subdistricts, 2 towns and 2 ethnic township under its jurisdictions.

10 subdistricts

- Renminlu Subdistrict (人民路街道)
- Beihu Subdistrict (北湖街道)
- Yanquan Subdistrict (燕泉街道)
- Xiameiqiao Subdistrict (下湄桥街道)
- Luoxian Subdistrict (骆仙街道)
- Zengfu Subdistrict (增福街道)
- Chenjiang Subdistrict (郴江街道)
- Yongquan Subdistrict (涌泉街道)
- Anhe Subdistrict (安和街道)
- Shigaitang Subdistrict (石盖塘街道)

2 towns

- Huatang (华塘镇)
- Lutang (鲁塘镇)

2 ethnic townships

- Baohe Yao Ethnic Township (保和瑶族乡)
- Yangtianhu Yao Ethnic Township (仰天湖瑶族乡)
