= Suxian, Chenzhou =

Suxian 苏仙区
- District
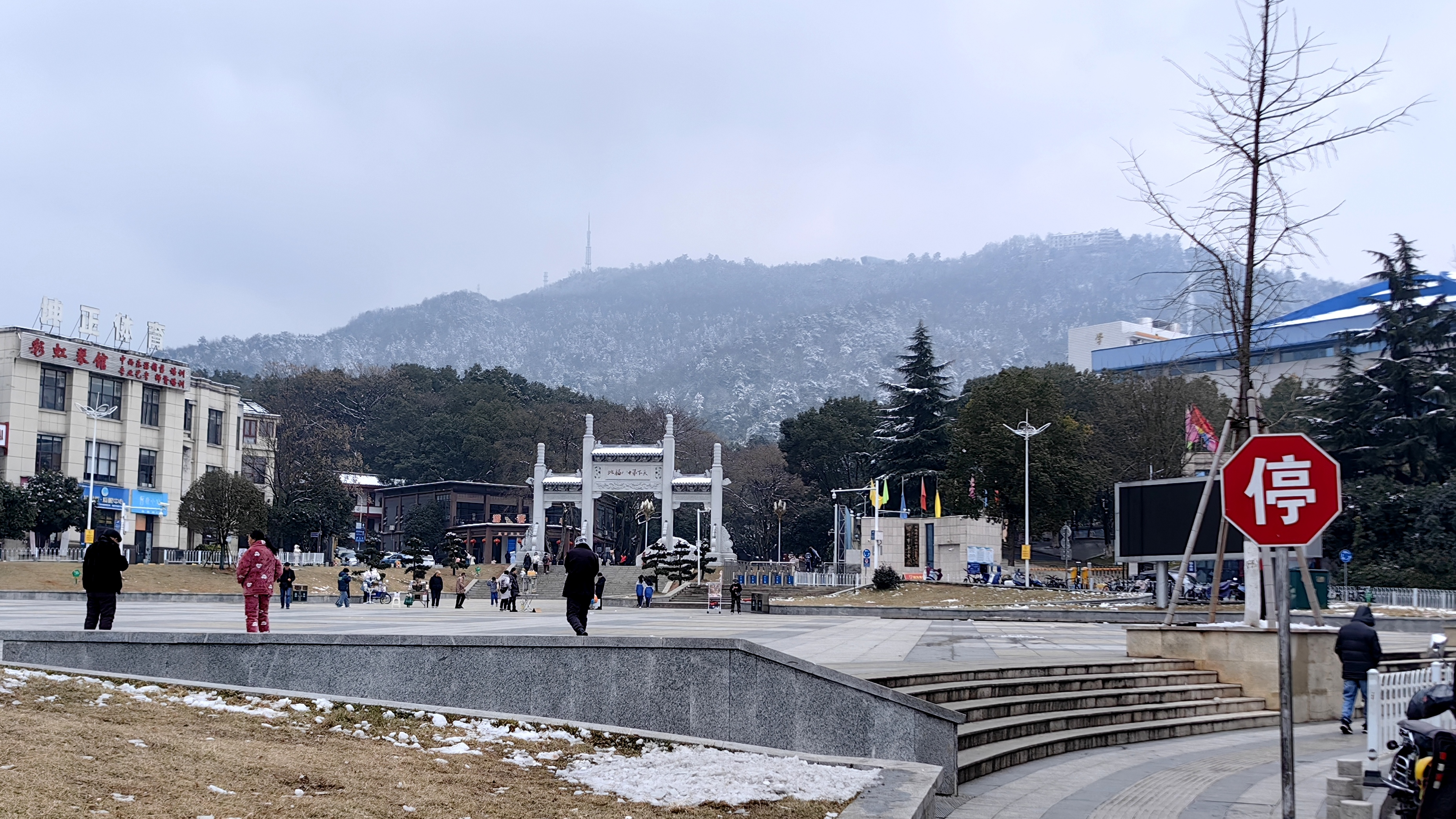

- Location in Hunan
- Coordinates: 25°46′41″N 113°05′32″E
- Country: People's Republic of China
- Province: Hunan
- Prefecture-level city: Chenzhou
- Time zone: UTC+8 (China Standard)

Suxian District (Chinese: 苏仙区; pinyin: Sūxiān Qū) is one of two urban districts in the prefecture-level city of Chenzhou, Hunan province, China.

The district is located in the northeastern part of the city proper. It is bordered to the north by Yongxing County, to the northeast by Zixing City, to the southeast by Yizhang County, to the southwest by Beihu District, and to the west by Guiyang County. Suxian District covers an area of 1,342 km^{2} (518 sq mi), and as of 2015, it had a registered population of 379,400 and a permanent resident population of 426,900. The district has six subdistricts and eight towns under its jurisdiction. The government seat is Suxianling Subdistrict (苏仙岭街道).

== Attractions ==
Gaoyi Ridge is a famous scenic spot in the district.

== Administrative divisions ==
6 subdistricts

- Bailudong (白鹿洞街道)
- Guanshandong (观山洞街道)
- Nanta (南塔街道)
- Puliping (卜里坪街道)
- Suxianling (苏仙岭街道)
- Wangxianling (王仙岭街道)

8 towns

- Aoshang (坳上镇)
- Bailutang (白露塘镇)
- Feitianshan (飞天山镇)
- Liangtian (良田镇)
- Qifengdu (栖凤渡镇)
- Wugaishan (五盖山镇)
- Wulipai (五里牌镇)
- Xujiadong (许家洞镇)
