= Zixing =

Zixing 资兴市
- County-level city
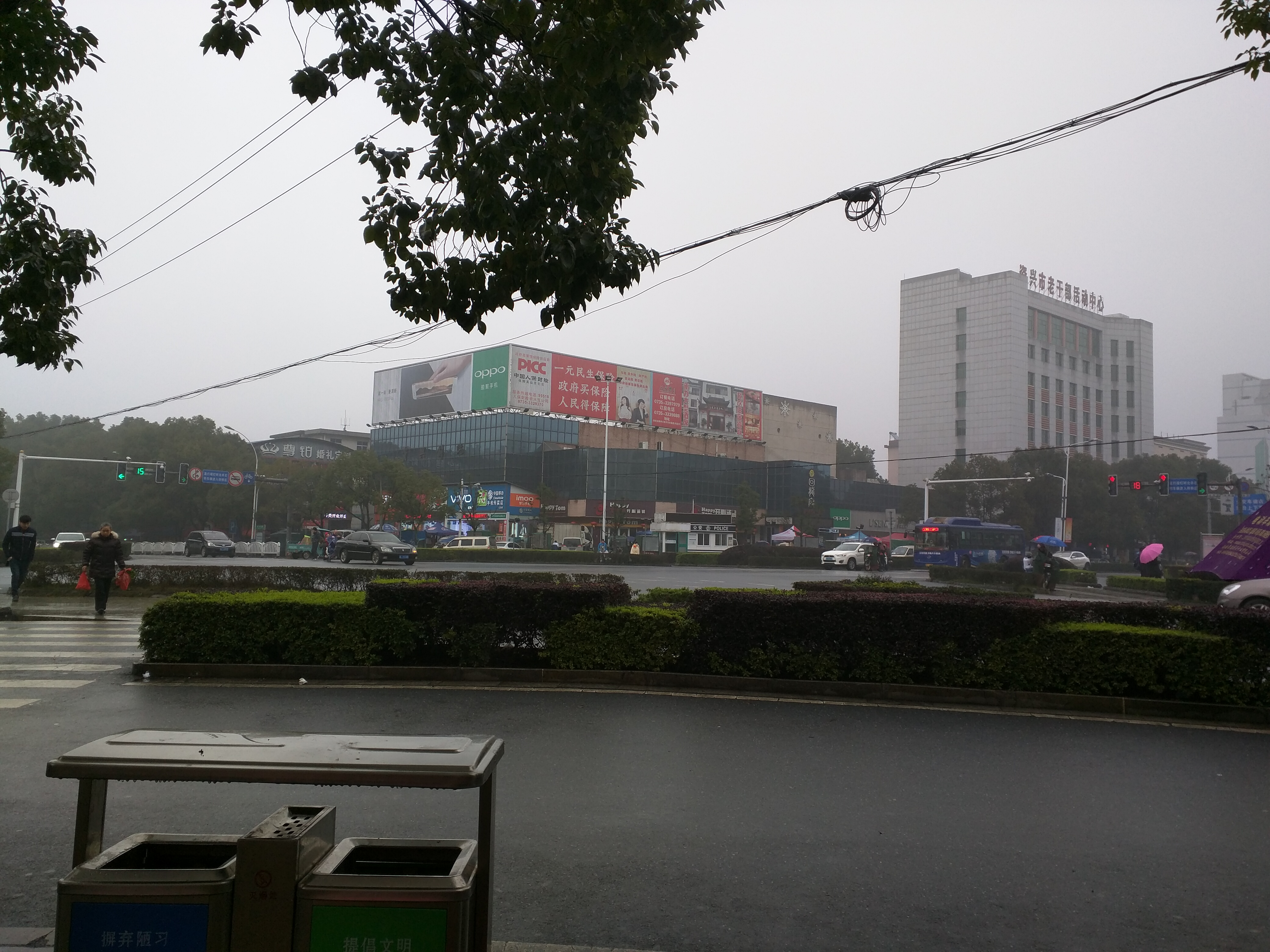
- Tangdong Subdistrict

- Location in Hunan
- Coordinates: 25°58′23″N 113°13′52″E
- Country: People's Republic of China
- Province: Hunan
- Prefecture-level city: Chenzhou

Area
  - County-level city: 2,747.0 km^{2} (1,060.6 sq mi)
  - Urban: 24.63 km^{2} (9.51 sq mi)

Population (2017)
  - County-level city: 395,000
  - Density: 144/km^{2} (372/sq mi)
  - Urban: 169,600
- Time zone: UTC+8 (China Standard)

Zixing (simplified Chinese: 资兴; traditional Chinese: 資興; pinyin: Zīxīng) is a county-level city in Hunan Province, China. It is under the administration of Chenzhou prefecture-level City.

Located on the southeast of the province, it is near to the north of the Chenzhou city proper. The city is bordered to the northwest by Yongxing and Anren Counties, to the northeast by Yanling County, to the east by Guidong County, to the southeast by Rucheng County, to the southwest by Yizhang County, and to the west by Suxian District. Zixing City covers an area of 2,730.44 km^{2} (1,054.23 sq mi), and as of 2015, It had a registered population of 378,400 and a resident population of 345,100. The city has two subdistricts, nine towns and two townships under its jurisdiction, and the government seat is Tangdong Subdistrict (唐洞街道).

== Administrative divisions ==
2 subdistricts

- Dongjiang (东江街道)
- Tangdong (唐洞街道)

9 towns

- Bailang (白廊镇)
- Chukou (滁口镇)
- Huangcao (黄草镇)
- Liaojiang (蓼江镇)
- Qingjiang (清江镇)
- Sandu (三都镇)
- Tangxi (汤溪镇)
- Xingning (兴宁镇)
- Zhoumensi (州门司镇)

2 ethnic townships

- Yao Bamianshan (八面山瑶族乡)
- Yao Huilongshan (回龙山瑶族乡)

== Climate ==
Climate data for Zixing, elevation 139 m (456 ft), (1991–2020 normals, extremes 1981–present)
Month	Jan	Feb	Mar	Apr	May	Jun	Jul	Aug	Sep	Oct	Nov	Dec	Year
Record high °C (°F)	28.5 (83.3)	32.9 (91.2)	35.5 (95.9)	36.6 (97.9)	37.1 (98.8)	37.5 (99.5)	42.0 (107.6)	40.4 (104.7)	38.5 (101.3)	35.7 (96.3)	34.2 (93.6)	27.2 (81.0)	42.0 (107.6)
Mean daily maximum °C (°F)	10.3 (50.5)	13.6 (56.5)	18.0 (64.4)	24.2 (75.6)	28.5 (83.3)	31.5 (88.7)	34.5 (94.1)	33.3 (91.9)	29.6 (85.3)	24.5 (76.1)	19.0 (66.2)	12.9 (55.2)	23.3 (74.0)
Daily mean °C (°F)	6.4 (43.5)	9.2 (48.6)	13.3 (55.9)	19.2 (66.6)	23.6 (74.5)	27.0 (80.6)	29.5 (85.1)	28.2 (82.8)	24.6 (76.3)	19.3 (66.7)	13.8 (56.8)	8.1 (46.6)	18.5 (65.3)
Mean daily minimum °C (°F)	3.9 (39.0)	6.4 (43.5)	10.3 (50.5)	15.8 (60.4)	20.1 (68.2)	23.7 (74.7)	25.6 (78.1)	24.7 (76.5)	21.3 (70.3)	16.0 (60.8)	10.5 (50.9)	5.0 (41.0)	15.3 (59.5)
Record low °C (°F)	−4.7 (23.5)	−2.6 (27.3)	−2.2 (28.0)	2.8 (37.0)	11.3 (52.3)	14.7 (58.5)	20.3 (68.5)	17.7 (63.9)	11.9 (53.4)	4.7 (40.5)	−1.1 (30.0)	−5.6 (21.9)	−5.6 (21.9)
Average precipitation mm (inches)	88.3 (3.48)	101.5 (4.00)	172.8 (6.80)	182.8 (7.20)	189.8 (7.47)	200.1 (7.88)	128.7 (5.07)	194.0 (7.64)	79.0 (3.11)	72.9 (2.87)	89.6 (3.53)	73.4 (2.89)	1,572.9 (61.94)
Average precipitation days (≥ 0.1 mm)	16.7	16.2	19.6	17.4	17.1	15.0	10.0	14.5	12.5	12.4	13.5	13.4	178.3
Average snowy days	2.2	1.3	0.2	0	0	0	0	0	0	0	0	0.6	4.3
Average relative humidity (%)	87	85	84	80	80	78	70	76	81	83	85	85	81
Mean monthly sunshine hours	50.6	58.8	68.3	98.4	125.6	143.7	224.9	181.1	136.4	117.3	97.7	82.8	1,385.6
Percentage possible sunshine	15	18	18	26	30	35	54	45	37	33	30	26	31
Source: China Meteorological Administration
