= Chenzhou =

Chenzhou 郴州市
- Prefecture-level city
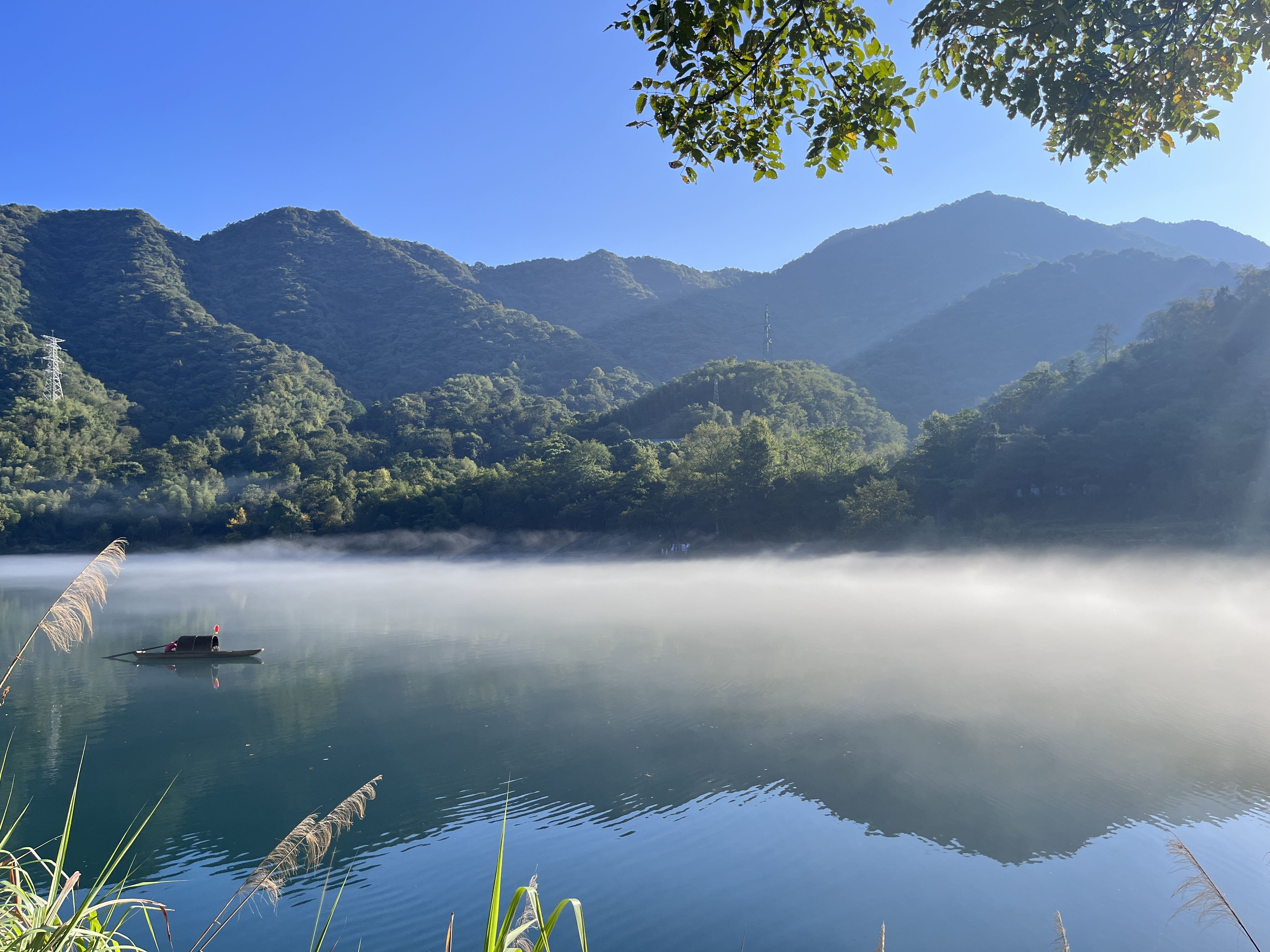
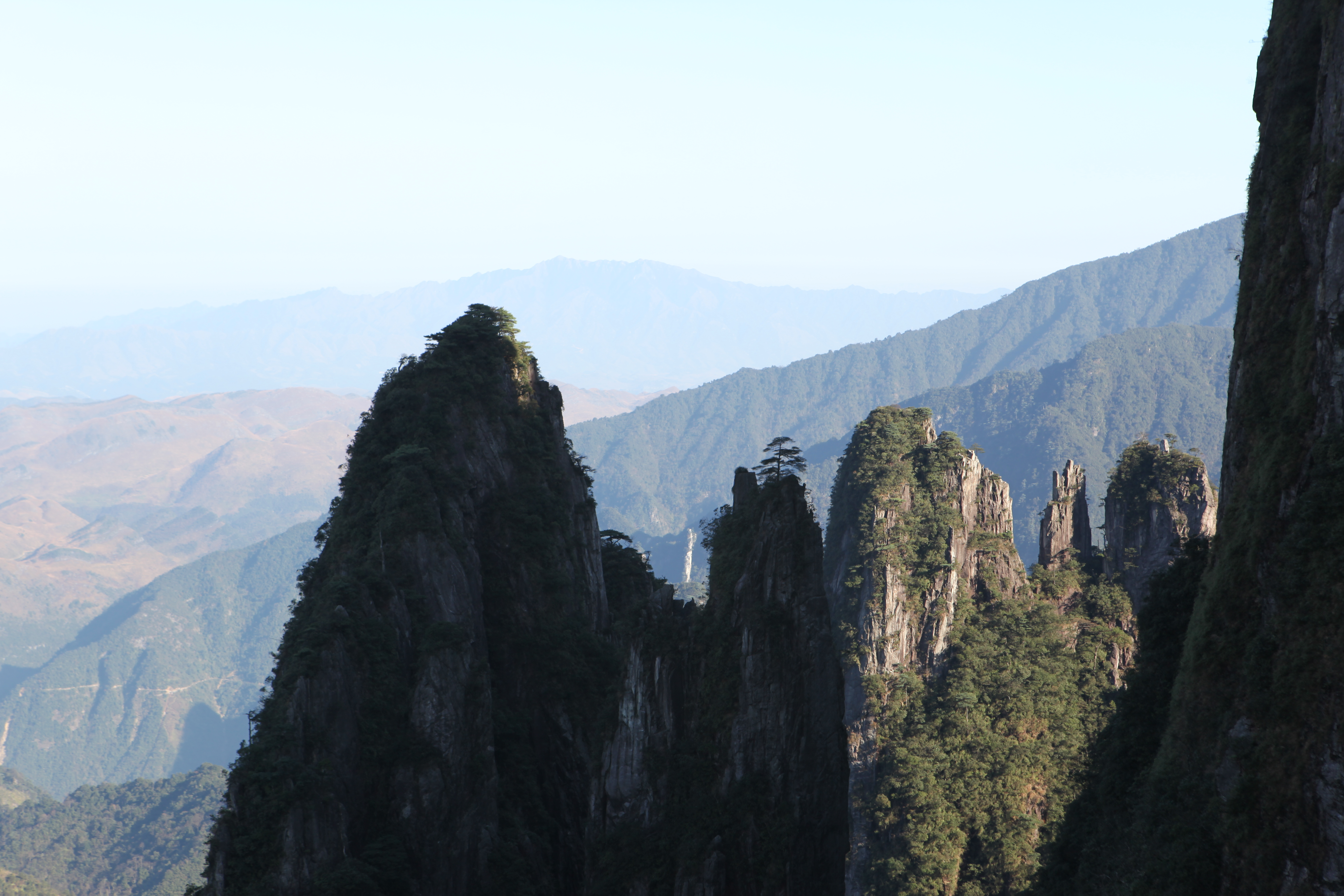
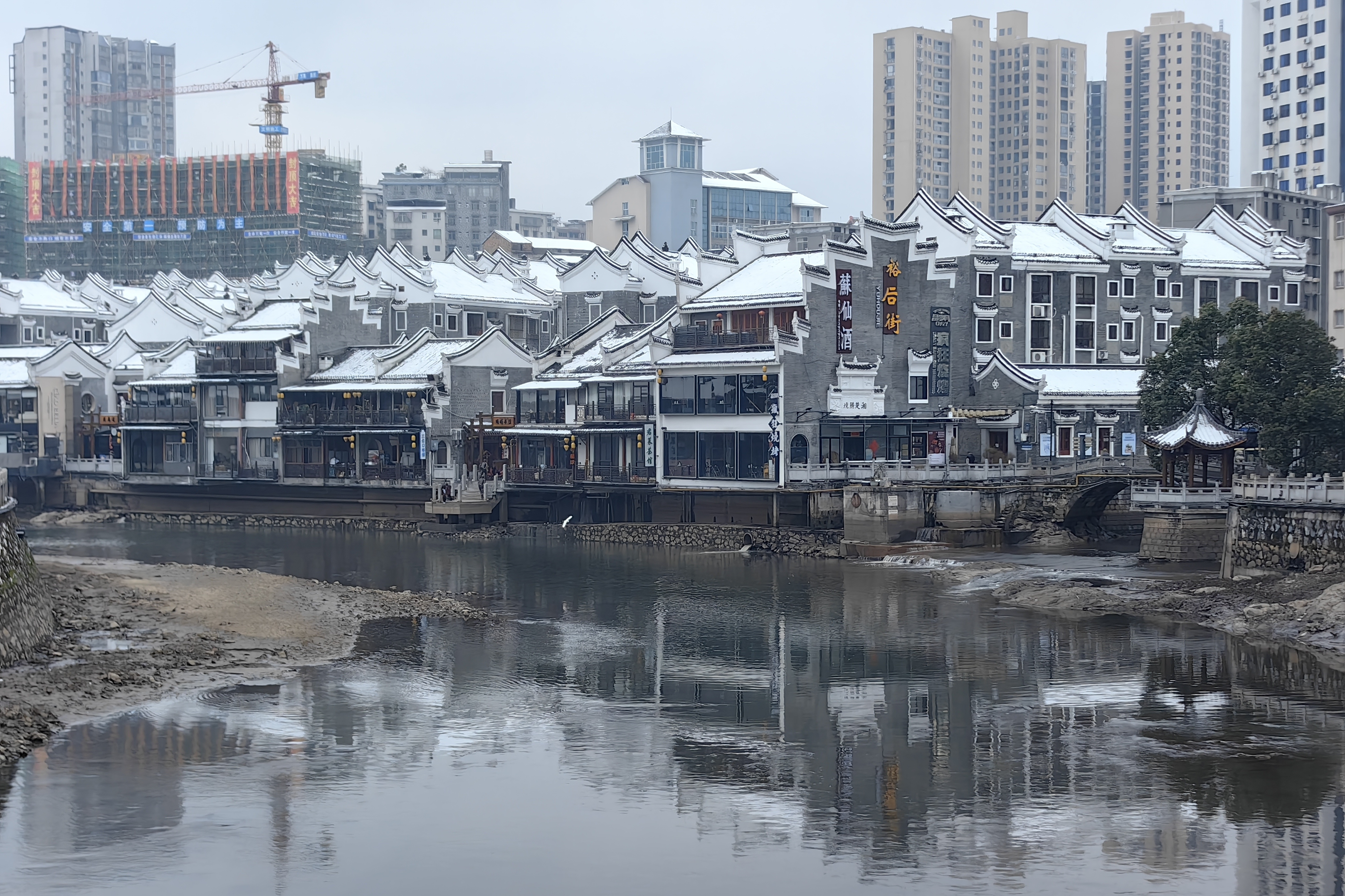
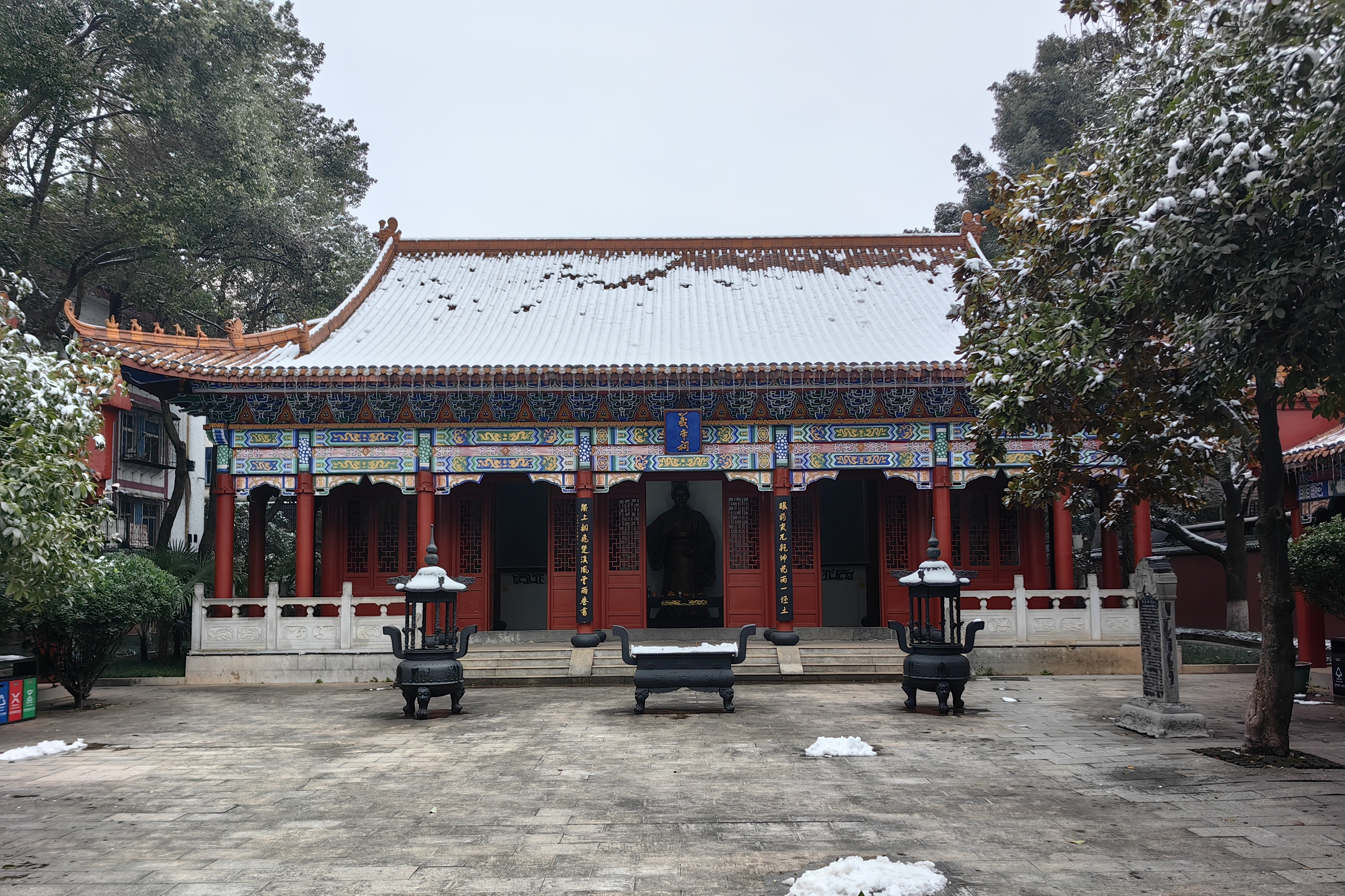
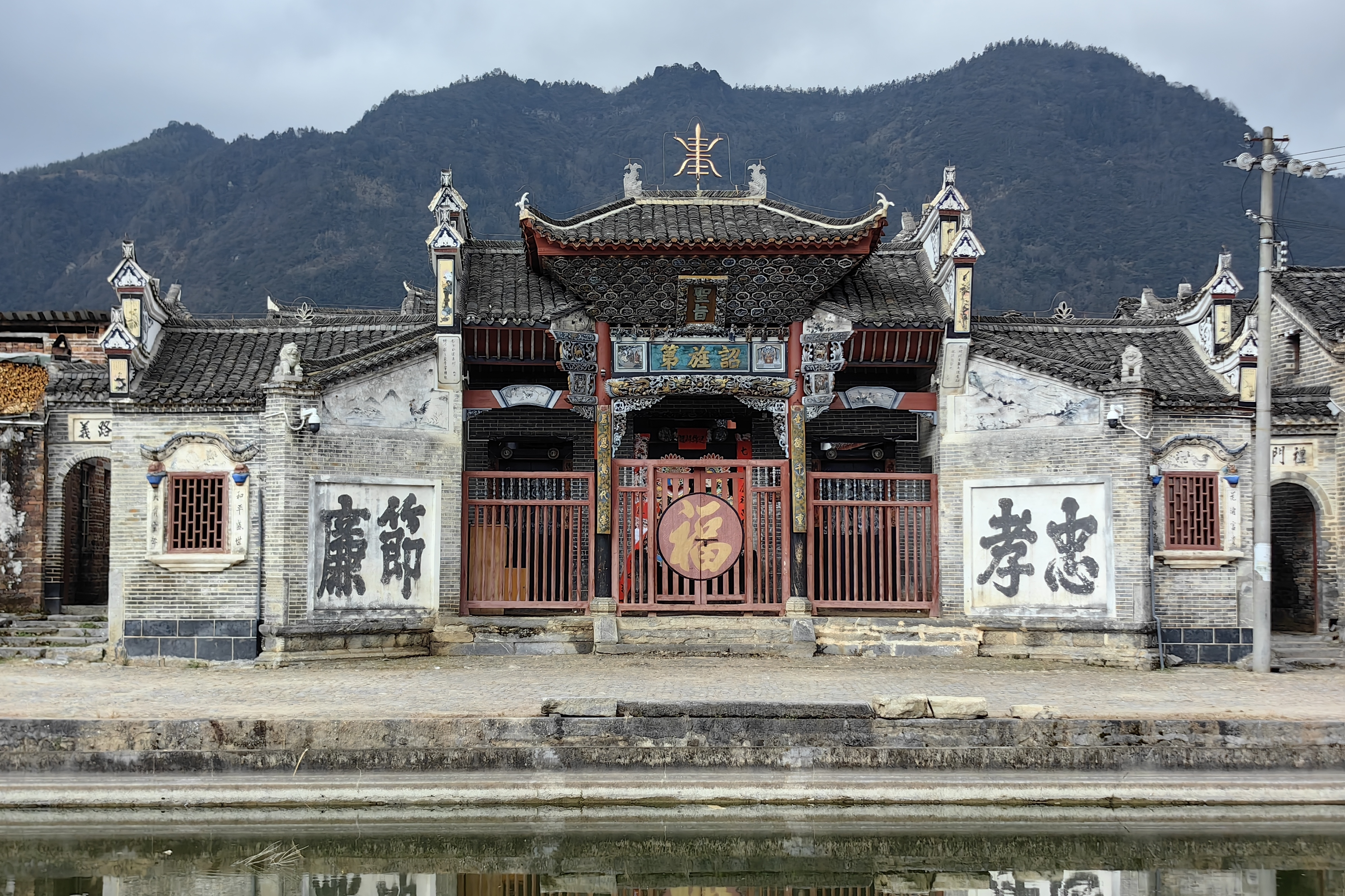
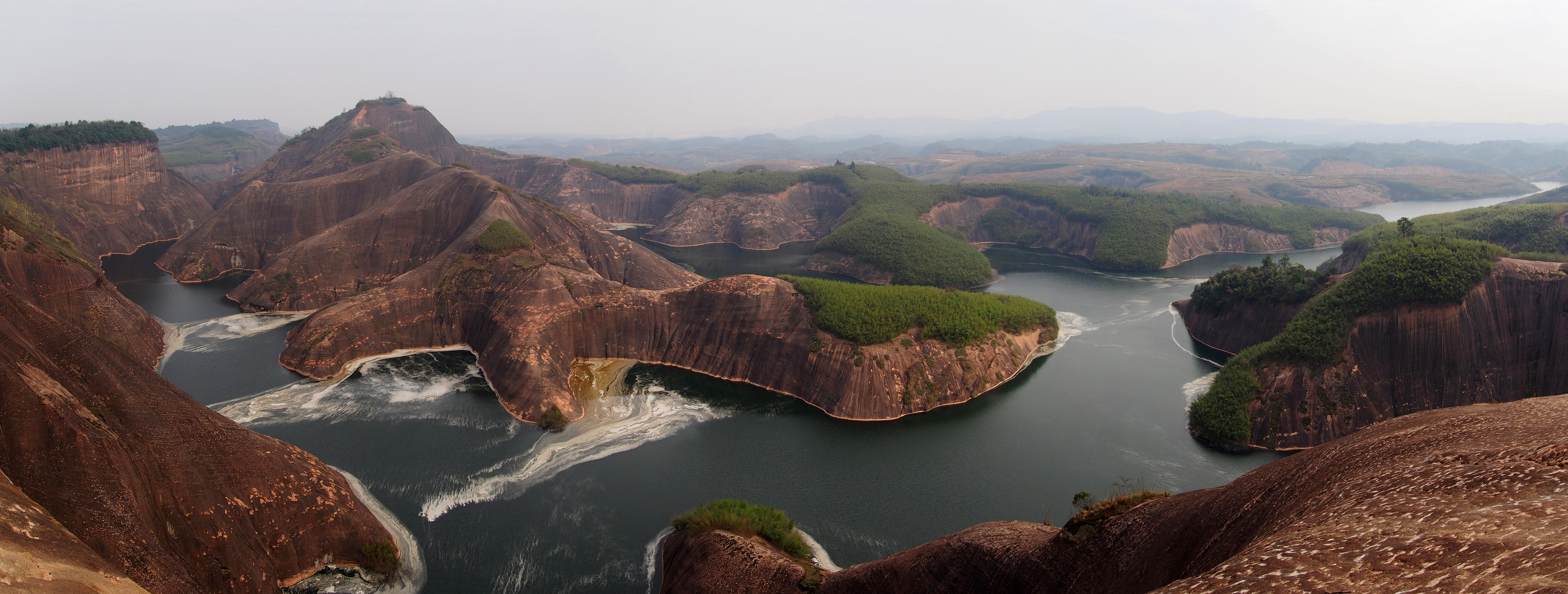
- Dongjiang Lake Mount Mang Yuhou Street Yidi Mausoleum Rucheng Ancestral Halls Gaoyi Ridge

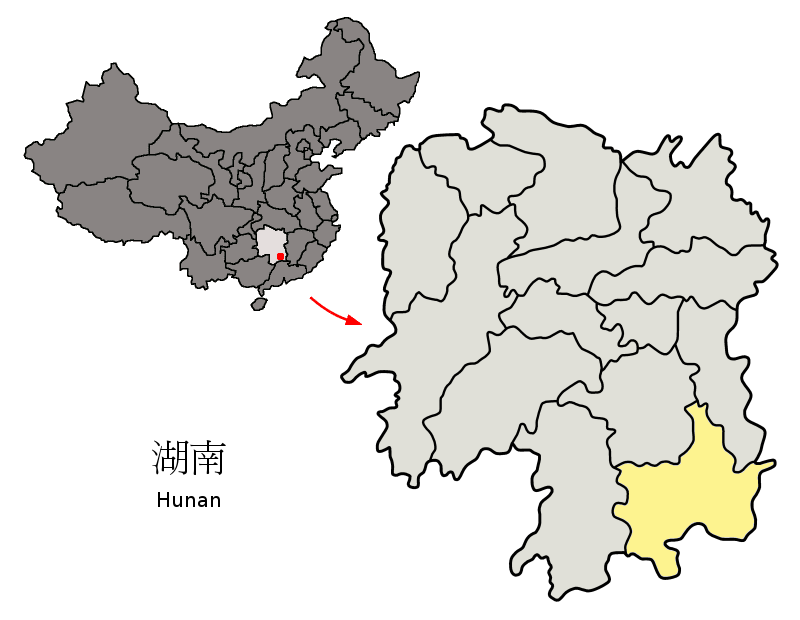
- Chenzhou's administrative area in Hunan

- Location of the city center in Hunan
- Coordinates (Chenzhou municipal government): 25°46′12″N 113°00′58″E
- Country: People's Republic of China
- Province: Hunan
- Municipal seat: Beihu District

Area
  - Prefecture-level city: 19,317 km^{2} (7,458 sq mi)
  - Urban (2017): 580.00 km^{2} (223.94 sq mi)

Population (2010 census)
  - Prefecture-level city: 4,581,778
  - Density: 237.19/km^{2} (614.32/sq mi)
  - Urban (2020): 960,000

GDP
  - Prefecture-level city: CN¥ 298.1 billion US$ 44.2 billion
  - Per capita: CN¥ 64,279; US$ 9,558
- Time zone: UTC+8 (China Standard)
- Postal code: 423000
- Area code: 0735
- ISO 3166 code: CN-HN-10
- License plate prefixes: 湘L
- Website: en.czs.gov.cn

Chenzhou (Chinese: 郴州; pinyin: Chēnzhōu) is a prefecture-level city located in the south of Hunan province, China, bordering the provinces of Jiangxi to the east and Guangdong to the south. Its administrative area covers 19,317 square kilometres (7,458 sq mi), 9.2% of the provincial area, and its total population reached 4,581,779 in the 2010 census, 26% of them living in urban areas, 74% of them living in rural areas.

== History ==
Chenzhou is a historical city dating back from the Qin dynasty. The area was historically named Guiyang (simplified Chinese: 桂阳; traditional Chinese: 桂陽; pinyin: Guìyáng) Commandery before being renamed to the current name in the year 735 during the Tang dynasty. The Chinese character 郴, meaning "City in the Forest", uniquely refers to only the area. Known to be popular among the literacy circle of the Tang courts, poets such as Wang Changling, Du Fu, Han Yu, Liu Yuxi and Qin Guan have visited and wrote poems to the natural beauty of the area.

According to unsourced claims from Jung Chang and Jon Halliday in their book Mao: The Unknown Story, Chenzhou, along with neighboring Leiyang city was razed in 1928 by troops (Chinese Red Army) under the command of Zhu De, who was following directives which originated in Moscow and passed on by higher officials of the Chinese Communist Party. The strategy was to leave large numbers of peasants from the cities with no option but to join communist uprisings.

Chenzhou was the site of a large investigation when its municipal government and party committee, led by Secretary Li Dalun, was charged on multiple counts of corruption in June 2006.

== Food ==
Chenzhou is a thousand-year-old city, known as the "land of the Nine Immortals and Two Buddhas". It is a blessed place for the development of Taoism and Buddhist culture, leaving many legends of gods and Buddhas. Among them, Su Dan, Shoufo Zhou Quanzhen, Liu Zhan, Liu Yi and other legends have also spread overseas, becoming intangible cultural heritage in China. In addition to visiting the local treasures of nature, people can also taste the folk flavors of Chenzhou.

=== Zilong County Tanzi Pork ===
Zilong County Tanzi Pork is a famous traditional dish in Chenzhou, Hunan Province, which belongs to Hunan cuisine. It is said that General Zhao Zilong, a famous general of the Three Kingdoms, planned to take Guiyang County. During the period when he was stationed in Guiyang County, he was good at governing the army and the people. The army did not disturb the people and was supported by the people. The people called Guiyang County Zilong County. In order to express their love for General Zhao Zilong, the local people used pork skin and pork belly into the five-clawed chili sauce jar in Fangyuan. After marinating with traditional folk techniques for several months, they gave them wine and rice to General Zilong. The taste was fragrant and spicy, and the aftertaste was long. General Zilong did not want to enjoy it alone, so he gave it to the lord Liu Bei to enjoy. After eating, Liu Bei had a great appetite and was full of praise, and then gave him the name "Zilong County jar meat". Zilong County's jar meat got its name from this, and it has been passed down.

=== Yongxing Roast Chicken ===
"Yongxing Roast Chicken" is a chicken stewed with ginger and tea oil, seasoned with pepper, soybean oil, and chicken broth. It is known to require careful control of the heat and cooking time.

=== Anren Dou pepper ===
Anren Dou pepper is a conventional dish in Anren County, Hunan Province. The Anren people are very fond of this dish. The dish can be described as spicy and fragrant. It is traditional, not flamboyant. It is known among the Anren people as a symbol of disease prevention and health.

=== Linwu duck ===
A specialty of Linwu County, Chenzhou City, Hunan Province, is a Chinese geographical indication product. It is one of the eight famous ducks in China. It is a food owned by Shunhua Duck Industry. It has a long breeding history and is mainly produced in the Wushui River Basin of Linwu County, one of the sources of the Pearl River. The growth cycle of Linwu duck is very long. It weighs only two and a half catties in 70 or 80 days. It has the characteristics of tender meat and delicious taste. It is famous for nourishing yin and reducing fire, beauty and fitness. Its taste ranks first among local hemp ducks in China. As a tribute to the imperial court, it is well known in southern Hunan and Guangdong. It was included in the Records of Livestock and Poultry Breeds in Hunan Province and won the Gold Award for High-quality Agricultural Products in Hunan Province.

=== Guiyang rice noodle meat ===
Guiyang rice noodle meat is a traditional famous dish in Guiyang County, Chenzhou City, Hunan Province. It has always been well known among the people in Guiyang. It is a must-have dish for banquets such as festivals, weddings and parties in Guiyang.

=== Taro lotus duck ===
Taro lotus duck is a famous dish of Yizhang. The tender green taro lotus and a little spicy taste are combined with delicious duck meat. The taste is rich, fresh and spicy, delicious, the taste is mellow, the oily color is thick, and there is no greasy feeling, which is mouth-watering. At the 3rd Chenzhou Folk Cuisine Cooking Competition, Yizhang taro lotus duck was rated as a famous folk dish in Chenzhou.

== Geography ==
Chenzhou is situated at the juncture of Hunan and Guangdong provinces at the foot of small Qitian Mountains of the Nanling Mountain Range. Places of interest, natural scenic spots, ancient relics and buildings make for over 100 tourism spots in the city. The major ones are the Suxian Hill, the Wanhuayan, the Dongjiang Lake, and the Wugai Mountain Hunting Field. Suxian Hill is located 2 kilometers east of Chenzhou, and covers 15 square kilometers.

== Climate ==
Chenzhou has a humid subtropical climate (Köppen climate classification: Cfa), with four distinct seasons. Spring is subject to heavy rainfall, while the summers are long, hot, and humid with lesser rainfall, and autumn is comfortable and rather dry. Winter is rather brief, but cold snaps occur with temperatures occasionally dropping below freezing, and while not heavy, rain can be frequent. The average temperature in Chenzhou in the coldest month (January) is 6.6°C (43.9°F), which is unusually cold at the same latitude in the world, 13.7°C lower than Miami in the United States, which is exactly the same latitude.

Climate data for Chenzhou, elevation 185 m (607 ft), (1991–2020 normals, extremes 1955-2020)
Month	Jan	Feb	Mar	Apr	May	Jun	Jul	Aug	Sep	Oct	Nov	Dec	Year
Record high °C (°F)	27.0 (80.6)	32.0 (89.6)	33.7 (92.7)	35.6 (96.1)	36.2 (97.2)	38.0 (100.4)	40.3 (104.5)	40.5 (104.9)	38.6 (101.5)	36.4 (97.5)	33.5 (92.3)	27.4 (81.3)	40.5 (104.9)
Mean daily maximum °C (°F)	10.2 (50.4)	13.4 (56.1)	17.3 (63.1)	23.9 (75.0)	28.0 (82.4)	31.2 (88.2)	34.2 (93.6)	33.0 (91.4)	29.2 (84.6)	24.6 (76.3)	19.0 (66.2)	13.1 (55.6)	23.1 (73.6)
Daily mean °C (°F)	6.6 (43.9)	9.3 (48.7)	13.1 (55.6)	19.2 (66.6)	23.6 (74.5)	27.0 (80.6)	29.6 (85.3)	28.3 (82.9)	24.7 (76.5)	19.8 (67.6)	14.2 (57.6)	8.6 (47.5)	18.7 (65.6)
Mean daily minimum °C (°F)	4.1 (39.4)	6.6 (43.9)	10.1 (50.2)	15.9 (60.6)	20.2 (68.4)	23.9 (75.0)	26.1 (79.0)	25.0 (77.0)	21.4 (70.5)	16.3 (61.3)	10.8 (51.4)	5.5 (41.9)	15.5 (59.9)
Record low °C (°F)	−9 (16)	−6.8 (19.8)	−1.9 (28.6)	2.9 (37.2)	10.0 (50.0)	13.4 (56.1)	18.6 (65.5)	18.3 (64.9)	13.2 (55.8)	2.2 (36.0)	−2.8 (27.0)	−6.3 (20.7)	−9 (16)
Average precipitation mm (inches)	80.0 (3.15)	97.8 (3.85)	156.1 (6.15)	169.3 (6.67)	188.2 (7.41)	195.7 (7.70)	126.3 (4.97)	191.3 (7.53)	86.8 (3.42)	72.0 (2.83)	78.4 (3.09)	68.2 (2.69)	1,510.1 (59.46)
Average precipitation days (≥ 0.1 mm)	16.4	16.1	19.4	16.5	17.4	15.8	10.3	14.6	11.7	10.7	11.7	12.0	172.6
Average snowy days	3.5	1.7	0.3	0	0	0	0	0	0	0	0	0.8	6.3
Average relative humidity (%)	80	80	80	76	75	74	66	72	76	75	76	76	76
Mean monthly sunshine hours	53.5	53.4	59.5	91.2	111.9	127.7	219.0	162.3	121.1	118.0	100.0	84.4	1,302
Percentage possible sunshine	16	17	16	24	27	31	52	40	33	33	31	26	29
Source 1: China Meteorological AdministrationNOAAall-time extreme low
Source 2: Weather China

== Administrative divisions ==
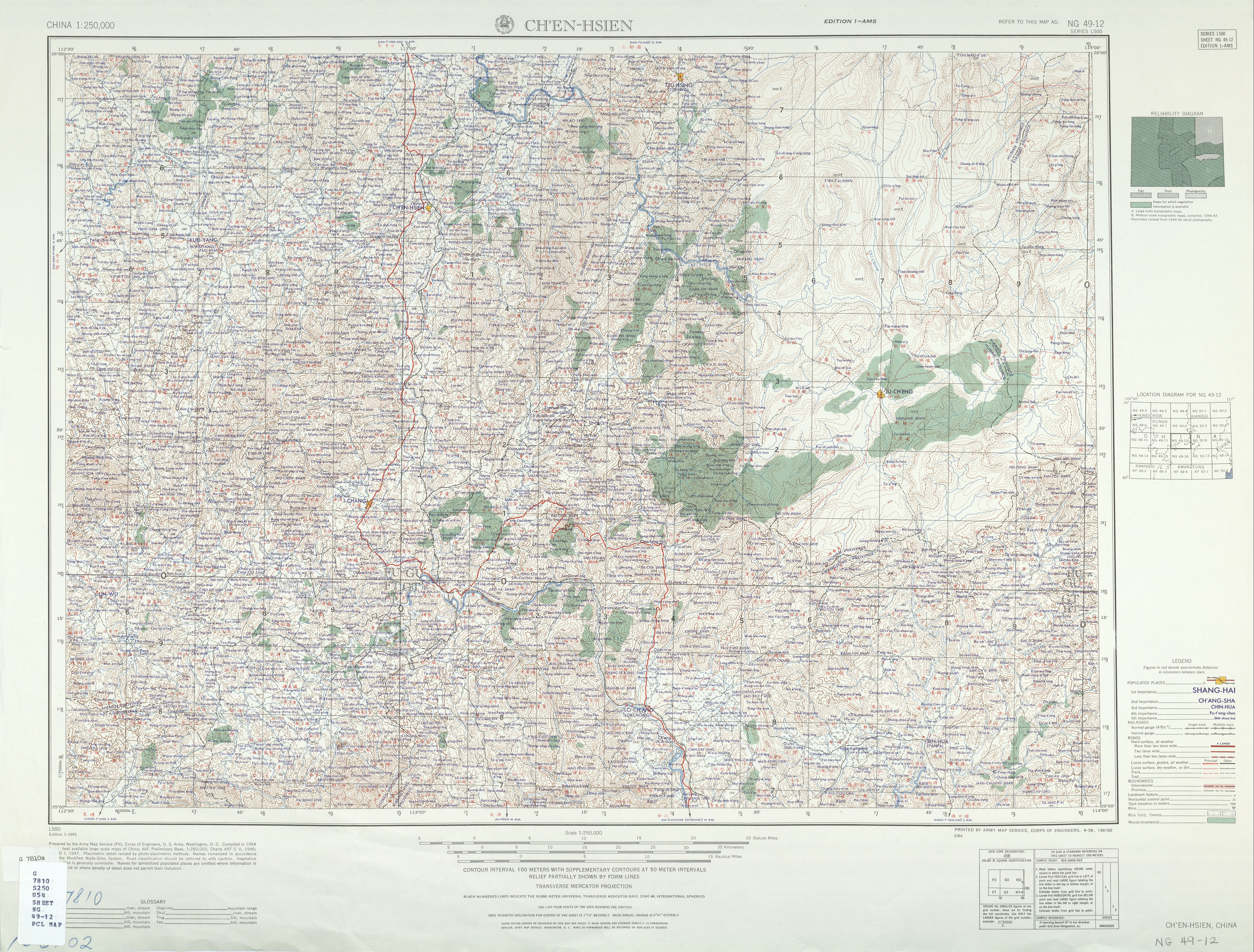
Map including Chenzhou (labeled as (Walled) CH'EN HSIEN 郴縣) (AMS, 1954)

- Beihu District (北湖区), 815 km^{2} (315 sq mi). Population: 300,000 (2003).
- Suxian District (苏仙区), 1,342 km^{2} (518 sq mi). Population: 249,900
- Zixing City (资兴市) 2,716 km^{2} (1,049 sq mi). Population: 360,000
- Guiyang County (桂阳县), 2,954 km^{2} (1,141 sq mi). Population: 790,000
- Yongxing County (永兴县), 1,979 km^{2} (764 sq mi). Population: 630,000
- Yizhang County (宜章县), 2,086 km^{2} (805 sq mi). Population: 560,000
- Jiahe County (嘉禾县), 696 km^{2} (269 sq mi). Population: 340,000
- Linwu County (临武县), 1,375 km^{2} (531 sq mi). Population: 310,000
- Rucheng County (汝城县), 2,424 km^{2} (936 sq mi). Population: 360,000
- Guidong County (桂东县), 1,453 km^{2} (561 sq mi). Population: 170,000
- Anren County (安仁县), 1,461 km^{2} (564 sq mi). Population: 390,000

Map
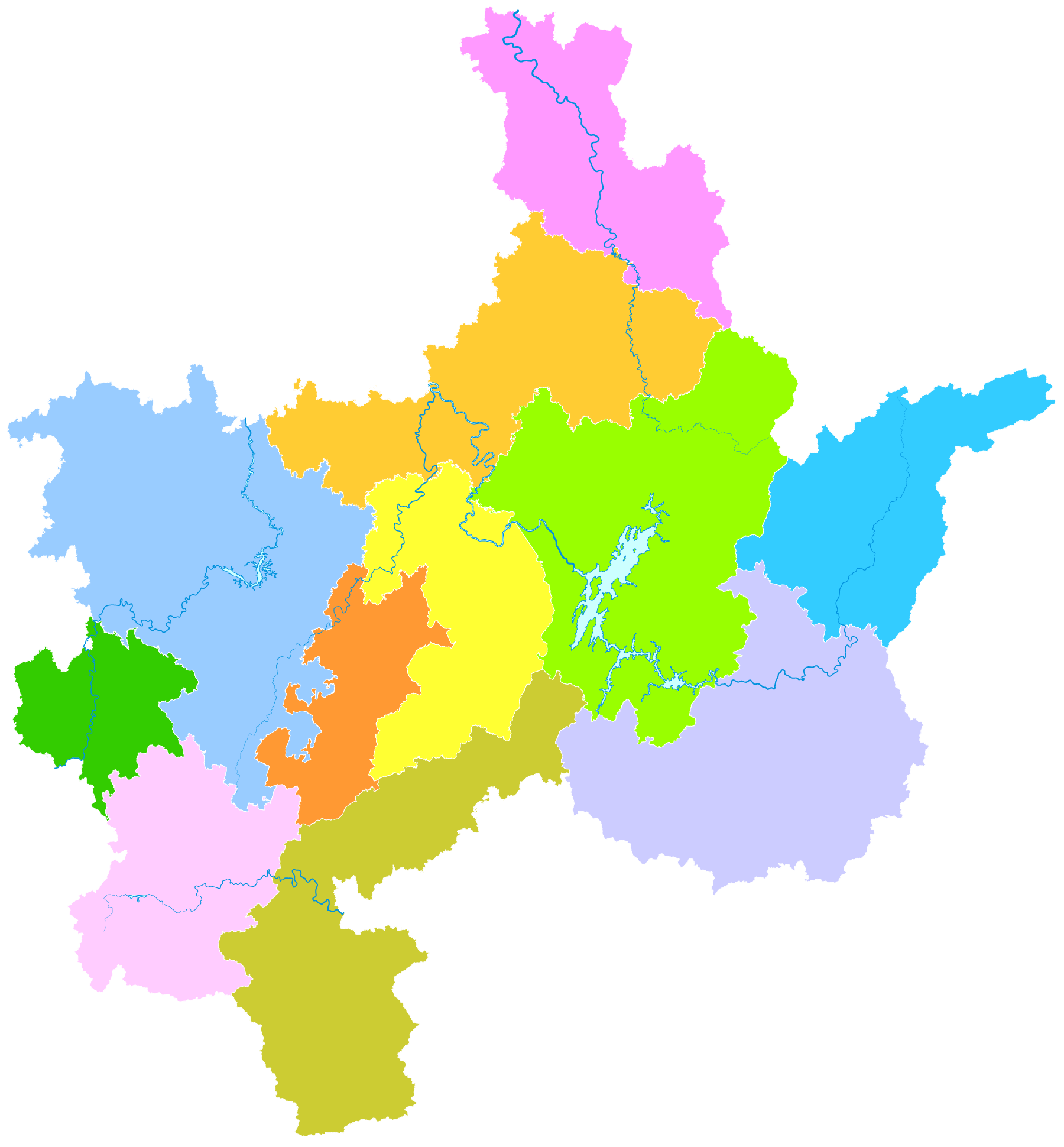

== Economy ==
Major deposits of tungsten, bismuth and molybdenum make Chenzhou a production base for non-ferrous metals.

== Colleges and universities ==
- Xiangnan University (湘南学院)
- Chenzhou Vocational Technical College (郴州职业技术学院)

== Notable people ==
- Duan Yixuan, a singer and actress
- Liu Huanhua, Olympic powerlifting Gold medal champion
- Long Yang, a hostess in CCTV
- Ouyang Jingling, a paralympic athlete
- Xue Yiwei, Chinese writer living in Montreal

== Government ==
The current CPC Party Secretary of Chenzhou is Wu Ju Pei and the current mayor is Kan Bao Yong.

== Tourism ==
The areas of interest in Chenzhou include: Wanhua Rock (万华岩), Wugai Mountain Hunting Field, Suxian Hill and Dongjiang Lake.
Suxian Hill, also known as the "18th blessed land in china," is a natural and historical tourism site. The hill is the site of many cultural legends, and boasts a scenic temple and Taoist relics. It also features an observation building designed by architect Yang Ying (杨瑛).

The city is served by Chenzhou Beihu Airport and Chenzhouxi Railway Station
