= Nanyue (disambiguation) =

Nanyue was an ancient kingdom that consisted of parts of the modern southern China and much of modern northern Vietnam.

Nanyue may also refer to:

- Nanyue District, in Hengyang, Hunan, China
- Mount Heng (Hunan), or Nan Yue, in Hunan, China
- Chinese for South Vietnam (南越)
- Nányuè (南樂), another name for Nanguan music
