= Zhusheng Temple (Hunan) =

Buddhist temple in Hunan, China

- 祝圣寺
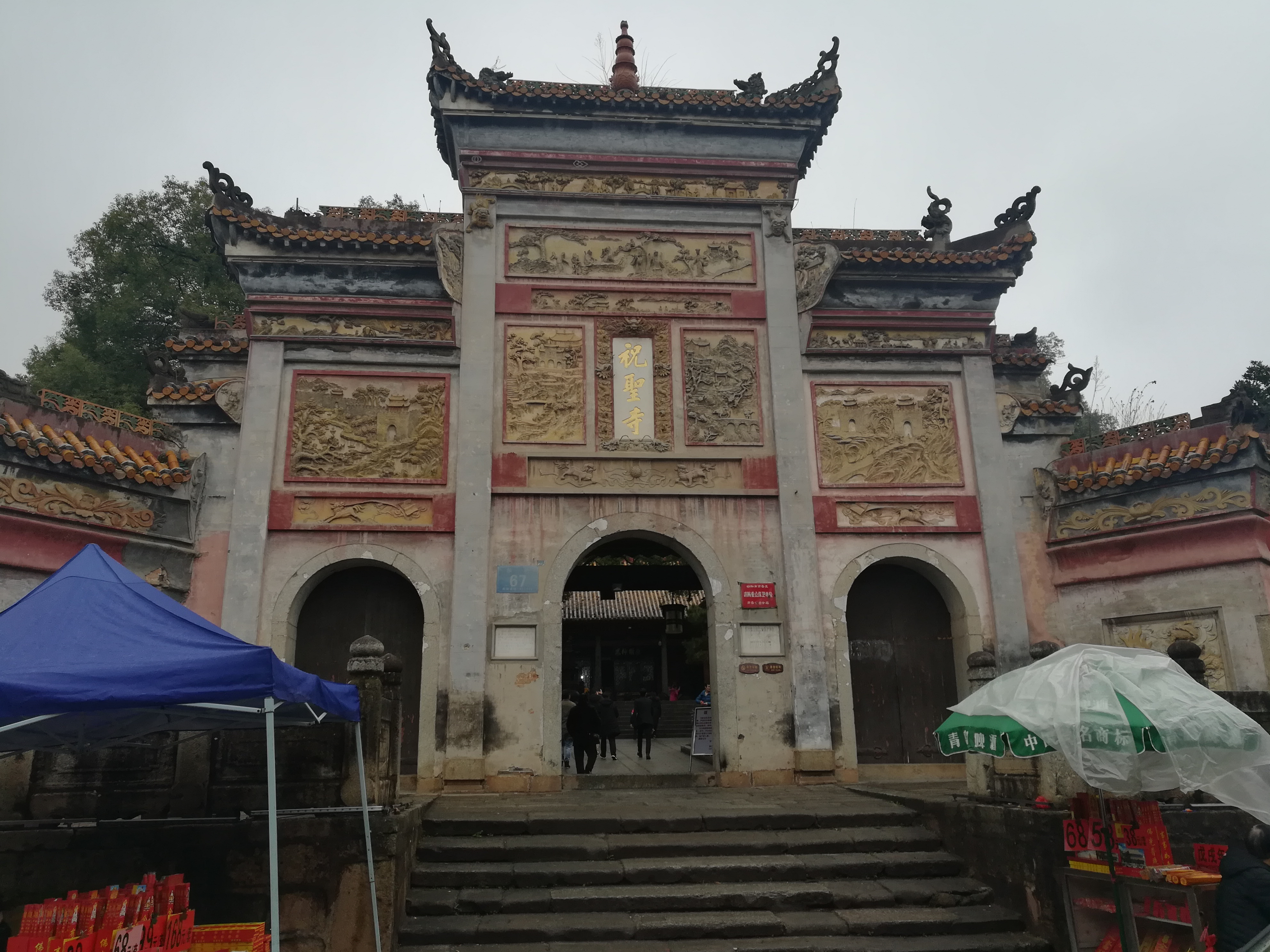
- The Shanmen of Zhusheng Temple.

- Location within Hunan

Religion
- Affiliation: Buddhism
- Sect: Chan Buddhism
- District: Nanyue District
- Prefecture: Hengyang
- Province: Hunan

Location
- Country: China
- Prefecture: Hengyang
- Coordinates: 27°14′55″N 112°44′39″E

Architecture
- Style: Chinese architecture
- Founder: master Chengyuan
- Established: 712-802

Zhusheng Temple (simplified Chinese: 祝圣寺; traditional Chinese: 祝聖寺; pinyin: Zhùshèng Sì) is a Buddhist temple located at the foot of Mount Heng, in Nanyue District of Hengyang, Hunan, China. It was inscribed to the National Key Buddhist Temples in Han Chinese Area's list in 1983.

== History ==
Zhusheng Temple was first construction as "Mituotai" (弥陀台) during the Tang dynasty (618-907) by master Chengyuan (承远), the Third Patriarch of Pure Land Buddhism. In 779, Emperor Daizong of Tang inscribed and honored the name "Bozhou Daochang" (般舟道场). During the Zhenyuan period of Emperor Dezong of Tang (785-805), the Tang emperor named the temple "Mituo Temple" (弥陀寺). Since Emperor Wuzong (814-846) of the Tang dynasty (618-907) who was a staunch Taoist, he ordered to demolish Buddhist temples, confiscate temple lands and force monks to return to secular life. This was known as "Huichang Suppression of Buddhism" (会昌法难). The temple was completely destroyed in the movement.

During the period of Five Dynasties and Ten Reigns (930-960), King Wumu of Chu Ma Yin rebuilt the temple and named it "Baoguo Temple" (报国寺).

During the Taiping Xingguo period (968-976) of Song dynasty (960-1279), Emperor Taizong of Song renamed it "Shengye Temple" (胜业寺). In 1119, Emperor Huizong of Song who was a staunch Taoist ordered to convert the Buddhist temple into a Taoist temple and named it "Shenxiao Palace" (神霄宫).

During the Yuan dynasty (1271-1368), Shengye Temple was enlarged burned, and consecrated several times.

In 1635, during the late Ming dynasty (1368-1644), abbot Foding (佛顶) renovated the temple.

In 1705, in the 44th year of Kangxi period of Qing dynasty (1644-1911), Kangxi Emperor made an inspection trip in the south, Zhao Shenqiao (赵申乔), provincial governor of Hunan, changed the temple to a Royal palace, but Kangxi Emperor didn't come here. In 1713, Kangxi Emperor gave the temple a set of Dragon-store Tripiṭaka (《龙藏》). In 1727, in the 5th year of Yongzheng period, Yongzheng Emperor renamed the temple "Zhusheng Temple" (祝圣寺), and has continued to this day.

During the early Republic period (1911-1949), Master Kongye (空也) established a branch of Tiantai school here. In 1929, Master Lingtao (灵涛) founded the "Buddhist Institute of Mount Heng" here. On May 7, 1937, Ye Jianying organised the Rescue Association of Mount Heng Buddhism and Taoism (南岳佛道救难协会) here.

After the establishment of PRC in 1956, the Buddhist Association of Mount Heng was set up here. During the disastrous Cultural Revolution, the red guards had attacked the temple. Buddhist scriptures, valuable historical documents, and other works of art were either stolen, damaged or destroyed, many original Buddha statues and musical instruments in the temple had been damaged or lost, but the buildings and halls remained intact. In 1979, according to the national policy of free religious belief, Zhusheng Temple was reconstructed and reopened. It has been designated as a National Key Buddhist Temple in Han Chinese Area in 1983.

== Architecture ==
Along the central axis of the temple stand five buildings including shanmen, Hall of Four Heavenly Kings, Mahavira Hall, Dharma Hall and Abbot's Room.

=== Mahavira Hall ===
The Mahavira Hall is the third hall in the temple. In the center of the temple enshrines the statue of Shijiamouni with Amituofo standing on the left and Yaoshi on the right.

== Gallery ==
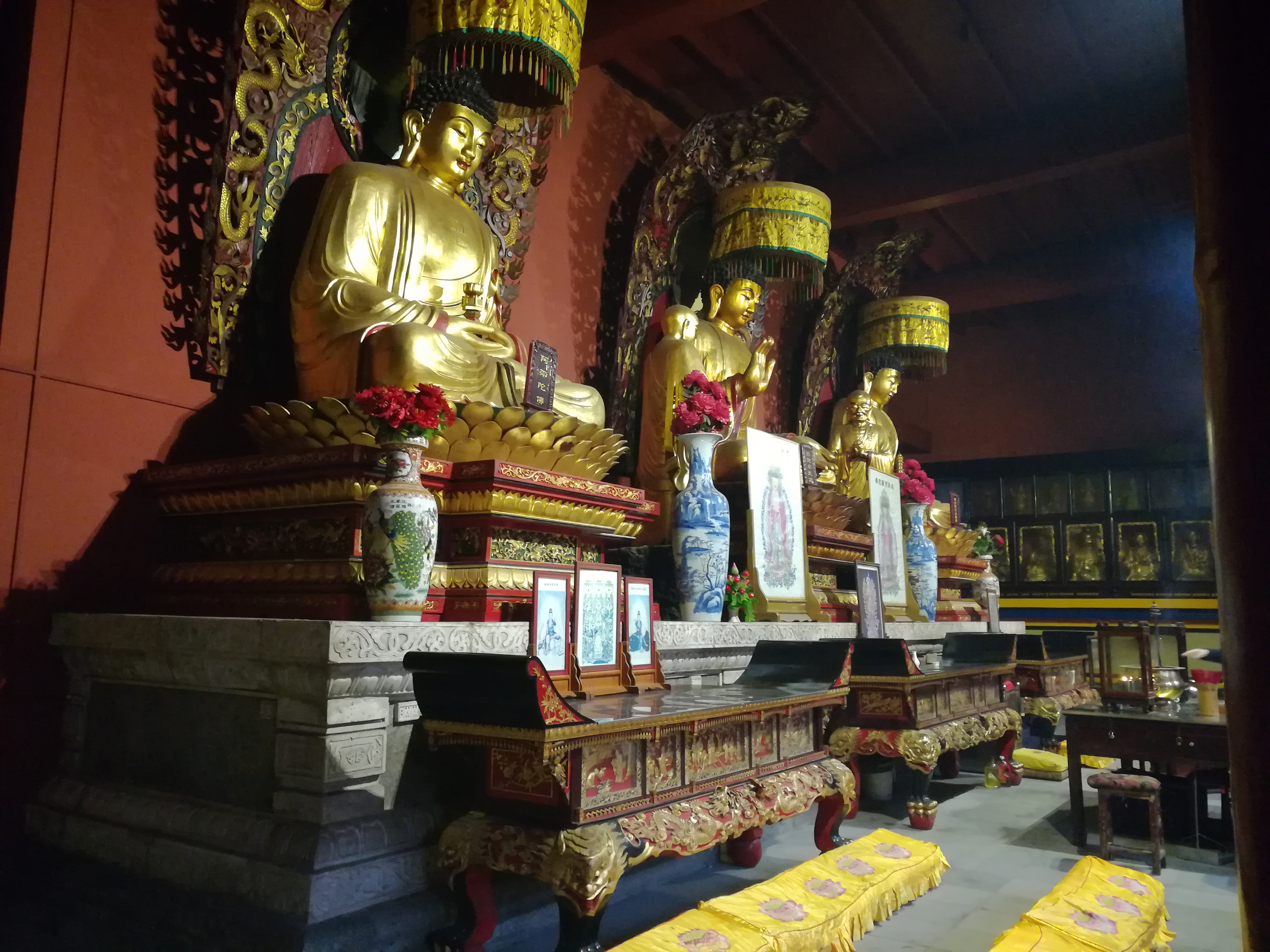
The statues of Yaoshi (right), Shijiamouni (middle) and Amituofo (left) at Zhusheng Temple.

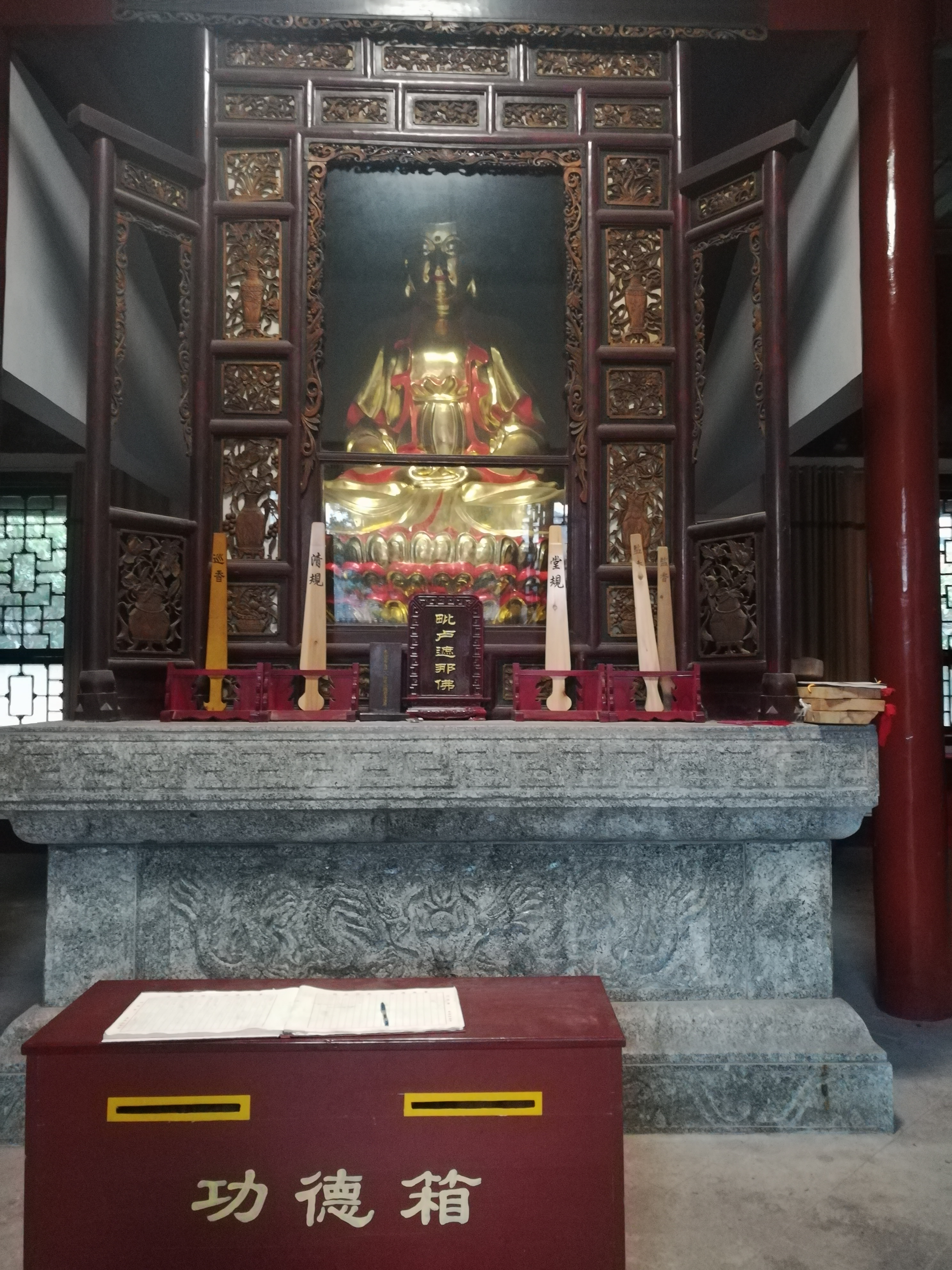
Shrine to Piluzhena in the temple

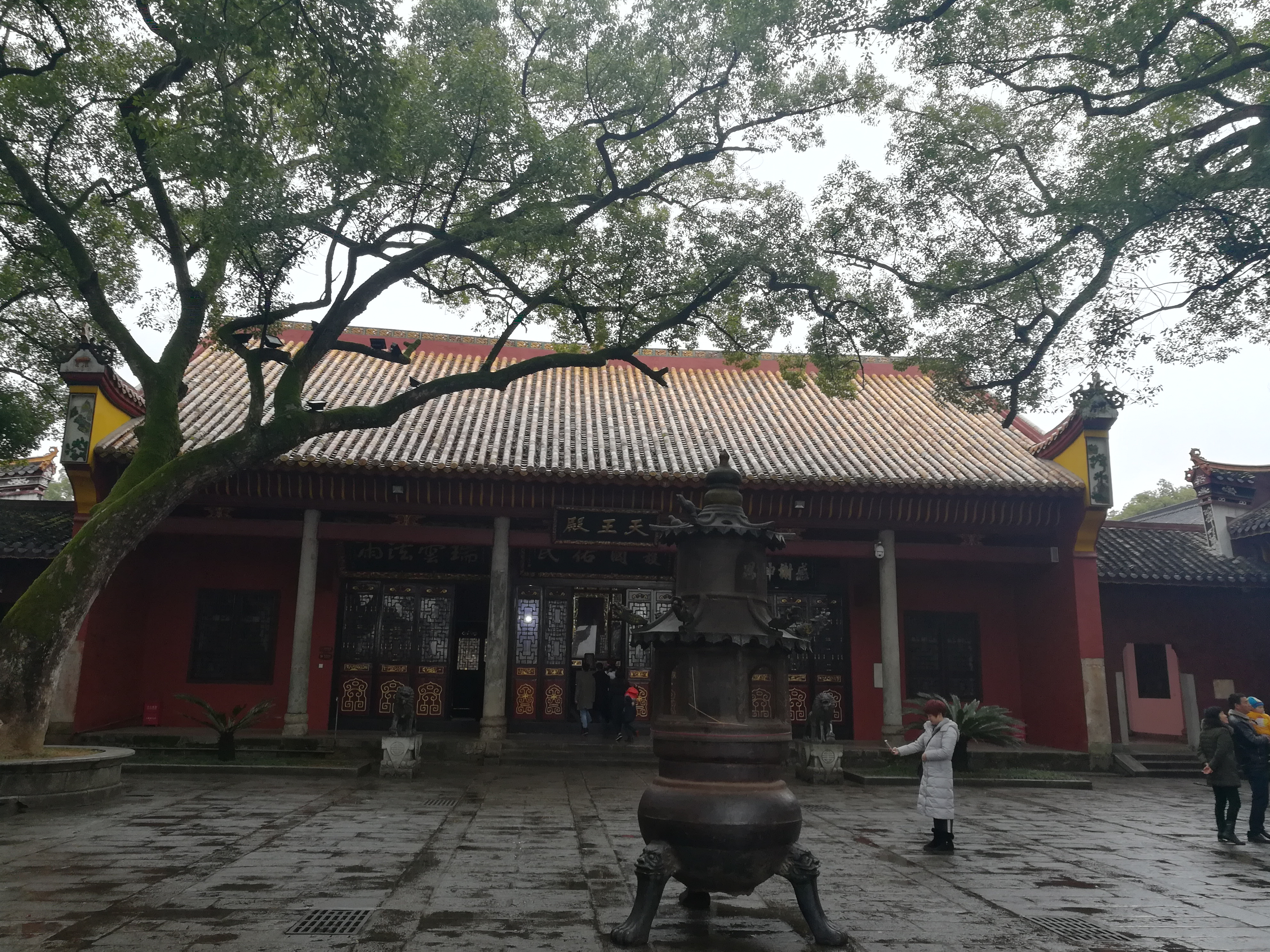
The Hall of Four Heavenly Kings

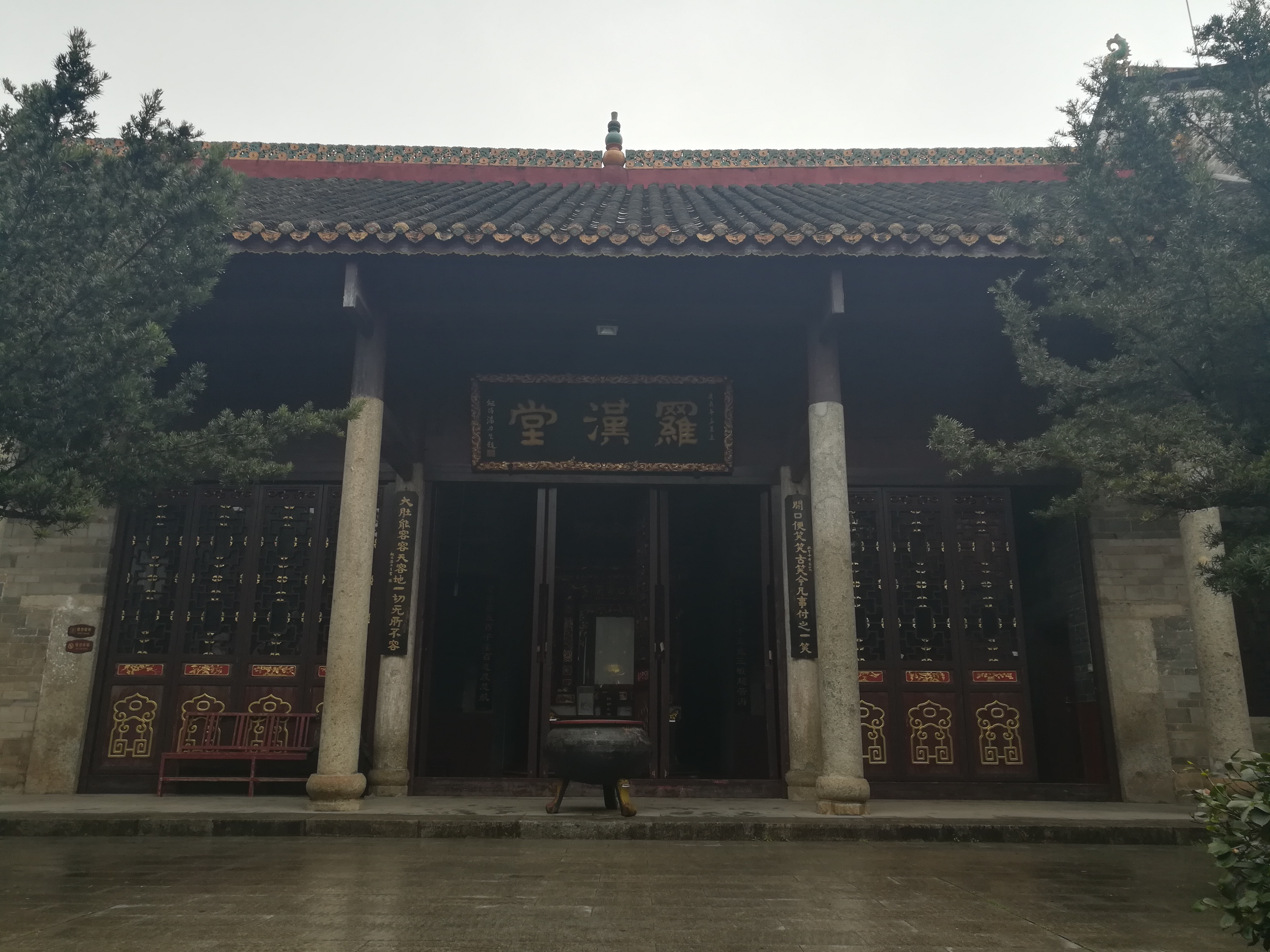
The Arhat Hall.

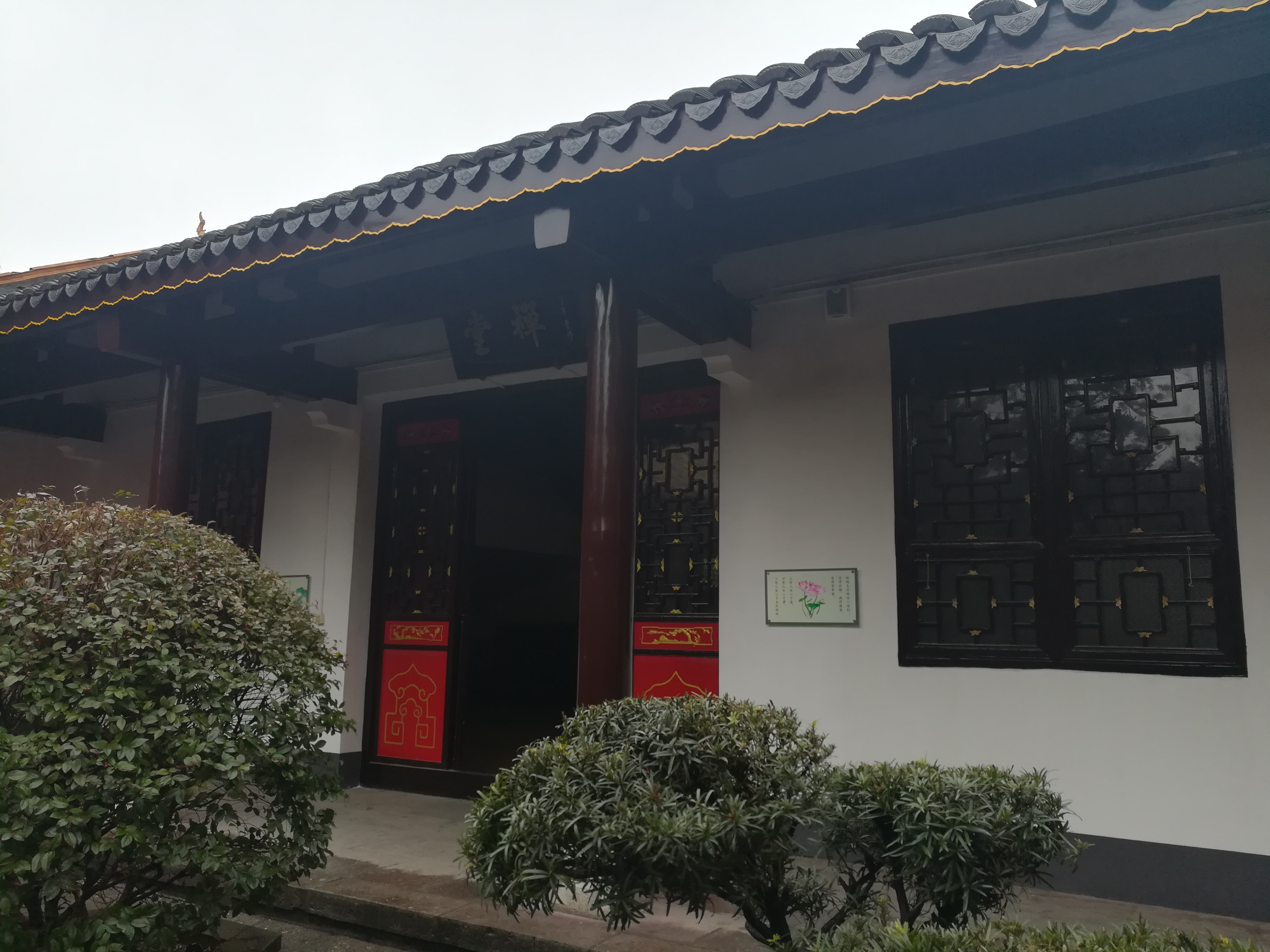
The Meditation Hall.
