= Kaiyun =

Kaiyun may refer to:

- Kaiyun Town (开云镇), a town in Hengshan County, Hunan, China

== Historical eras ==
- Kaiyun (開運, 944–946), era name used by Shi Chonggui, emperor of Later Jin (also used by concurrent rulers of Chu, Wuyue and Jingnan)
- Kaiyun (開運, 1034), era name used by Emperor Jingzong of Western Xia
