= Shangfeng Temple =

Buddhist temple in Mount Heng, China

- 上封寺
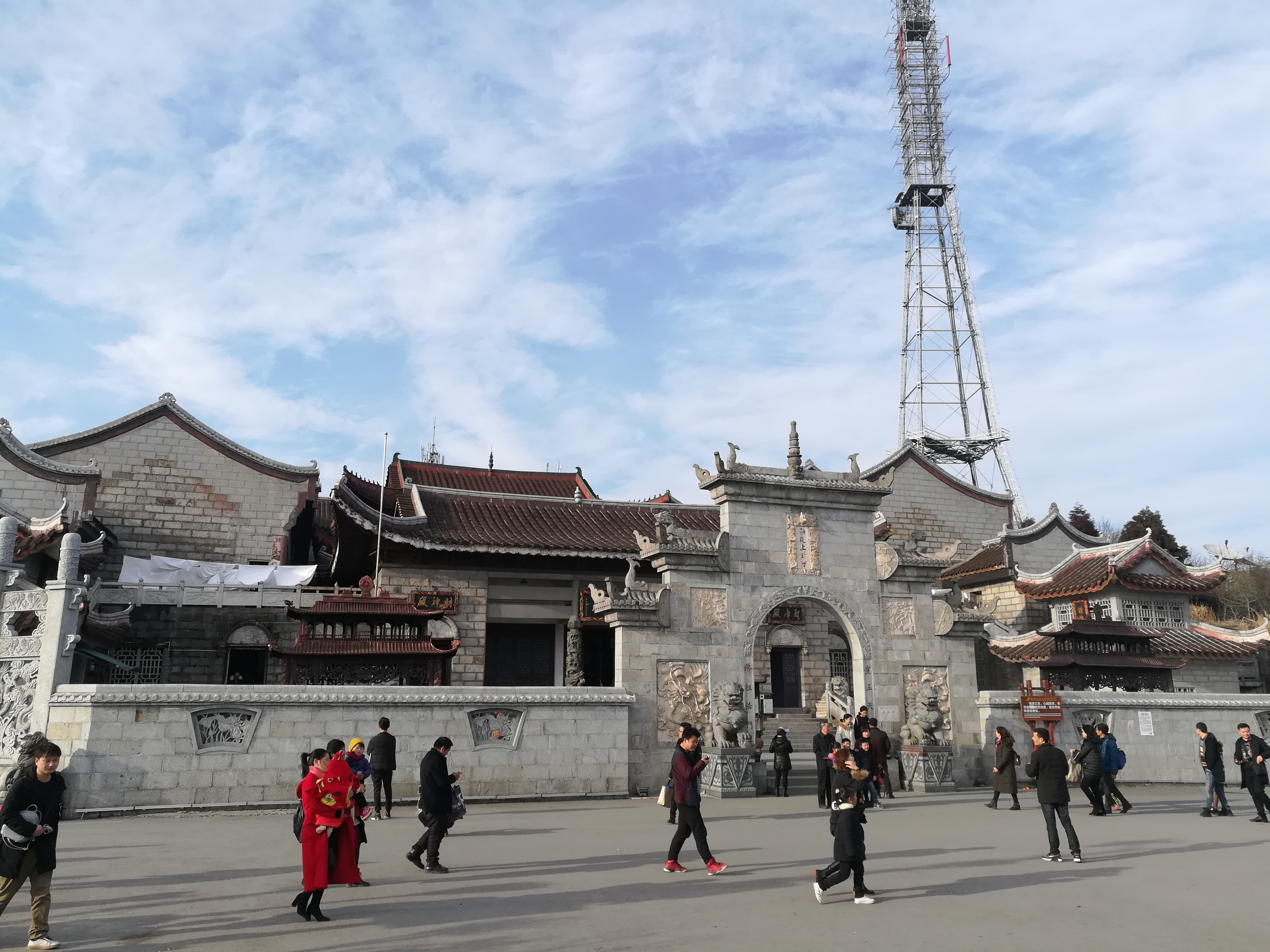
- A frontal view of Shangfeng Temple on February 23, 2018.

- Location within Hunan

Religion
- Affiliation: Buddhism
- Sect: Chan Buddhism
- District: Nanyue District
- Prefecture: Hengyang
- Province: Hunan

Location
- Country: China
- Prefecture: Hengyang
- Coordinates: 27°17′52″N 112°42′20″E

Architecture
- Style: Chinese architecture
- Established: 605-618

Shangfeng Temple (Chinese: 上封寺; pinyin: Shàngfēng Sì) is a Buddhist temple located on the top of Mount Heng, in Nanyue District of Hengyang, Hunan, China. It was inscribed to the National Key Buddhist Temples in Han Chinese Area's list in 1983.

== History ==
During the Eastern Han dynasty (25-220), the temple was a Taoist temple and formerly known as "Guangtian Taoist Temple" (光天道观).

In the Daye period of Sui dynasty (581-618), Emperor Yang of Sui toured the temple and ordered the temple to convert to Buddhism, and inscribed and honored the name "Shangfeng Temple" (上封寺).

In the Jiajing period of Ming dynasty (1368-1644), the Hall of Four Heavenly Kings was added to the temple. Luo Zhan (罗枬), a Buddhist believer, presented iron statues of the Four Heavenly Kings to the temple.

In the Kangxi period of Qing dynasty (1644-1911), Hunan Governor Zhou Zhaonan (周召南) put master Yimu forward as abbot. Under his leadership, the temple had reached unprecedented heyday. In the Tongzhi period, Zeng Guoquan, donated property to renovate the temple.

In 1927, abbot Suchan (素禅) was killed by the Nationalist government. Then the temple have been desolated and the buildings and halls have been torn down. In 1932, master Baosheng (宝生) was proposed as the abbot of Shangfeng Temple. Under his leadership, the Hall of Four Heavenly Kings and Mahavira Hall was rebuilt, the Hall of Guru, Meditation Hall and Monk's Bedroom were added to the temple. During the Second Sino-Japanese War, Mount Heng was occupied by the Imperial Japanese Army, most of the temple buildings were destroyed in the battle of Hunan.

In 1983, Shangfeng Temple was authorized as a National Key Buddhist Temple in Han Chinese Area. In 1987, a large-scale reconstruction project began.

== Gallery ==
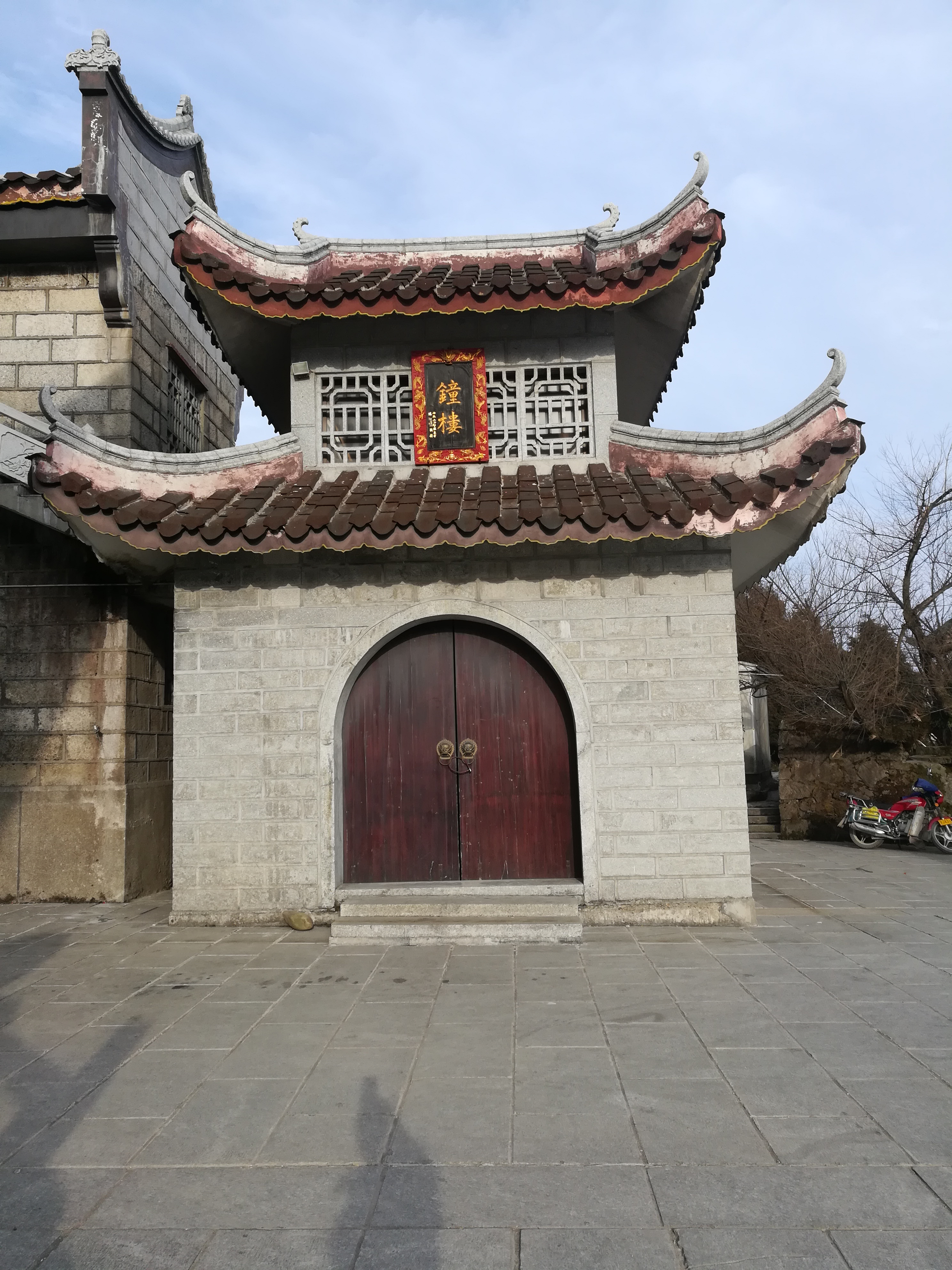
The Bell Tower.

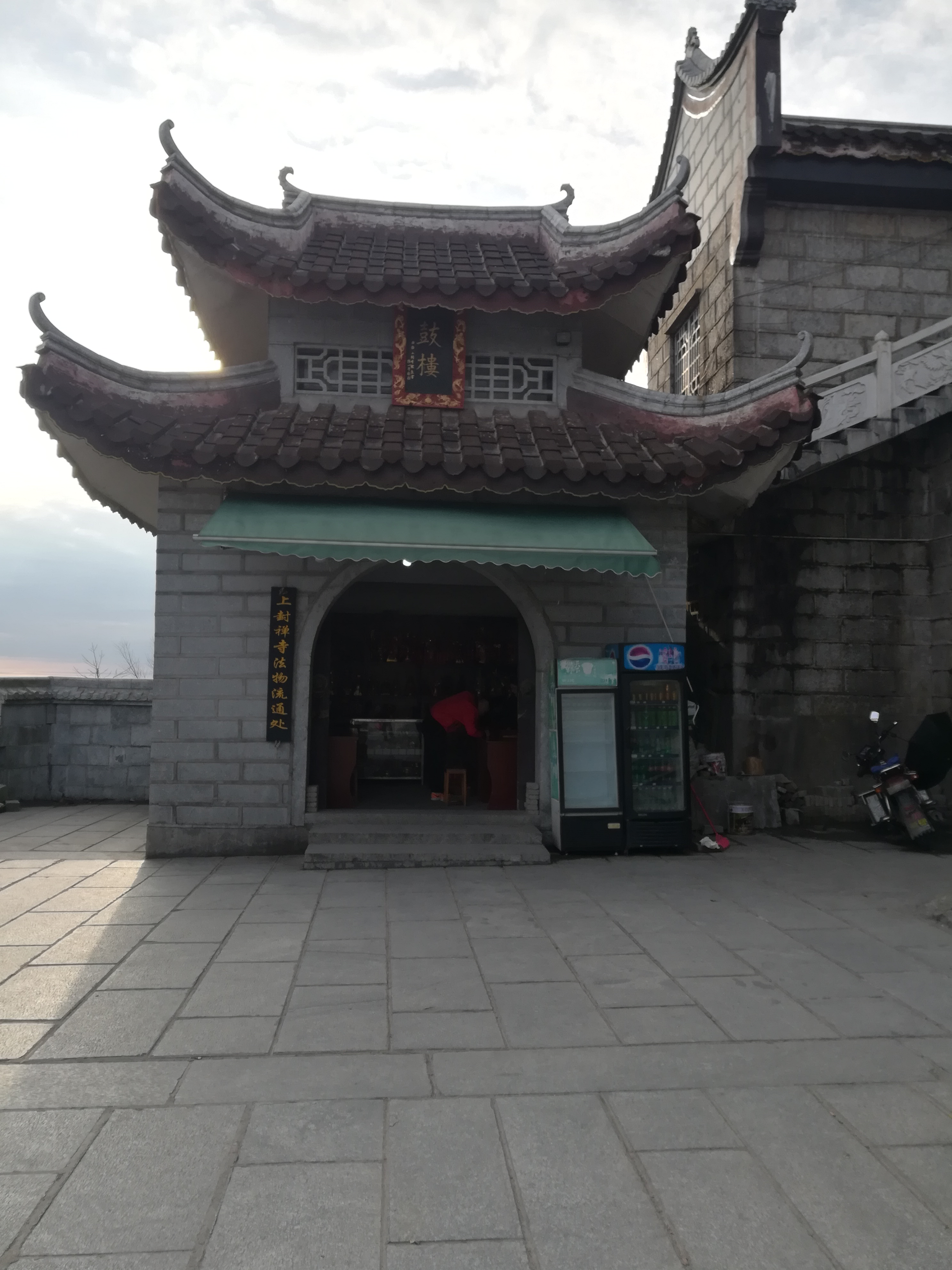
The Drum Tower.

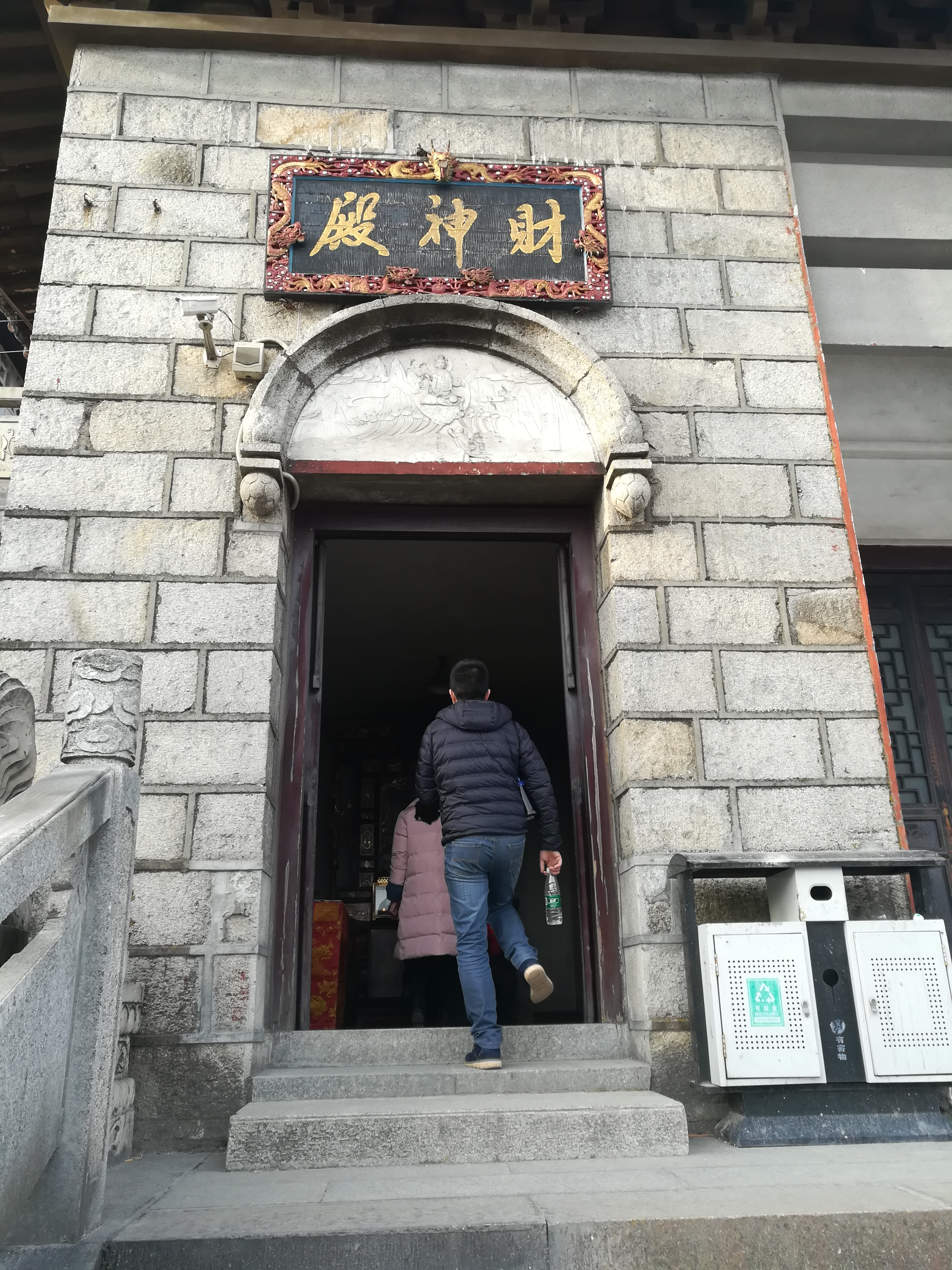
The Hall of the God of Wealth.

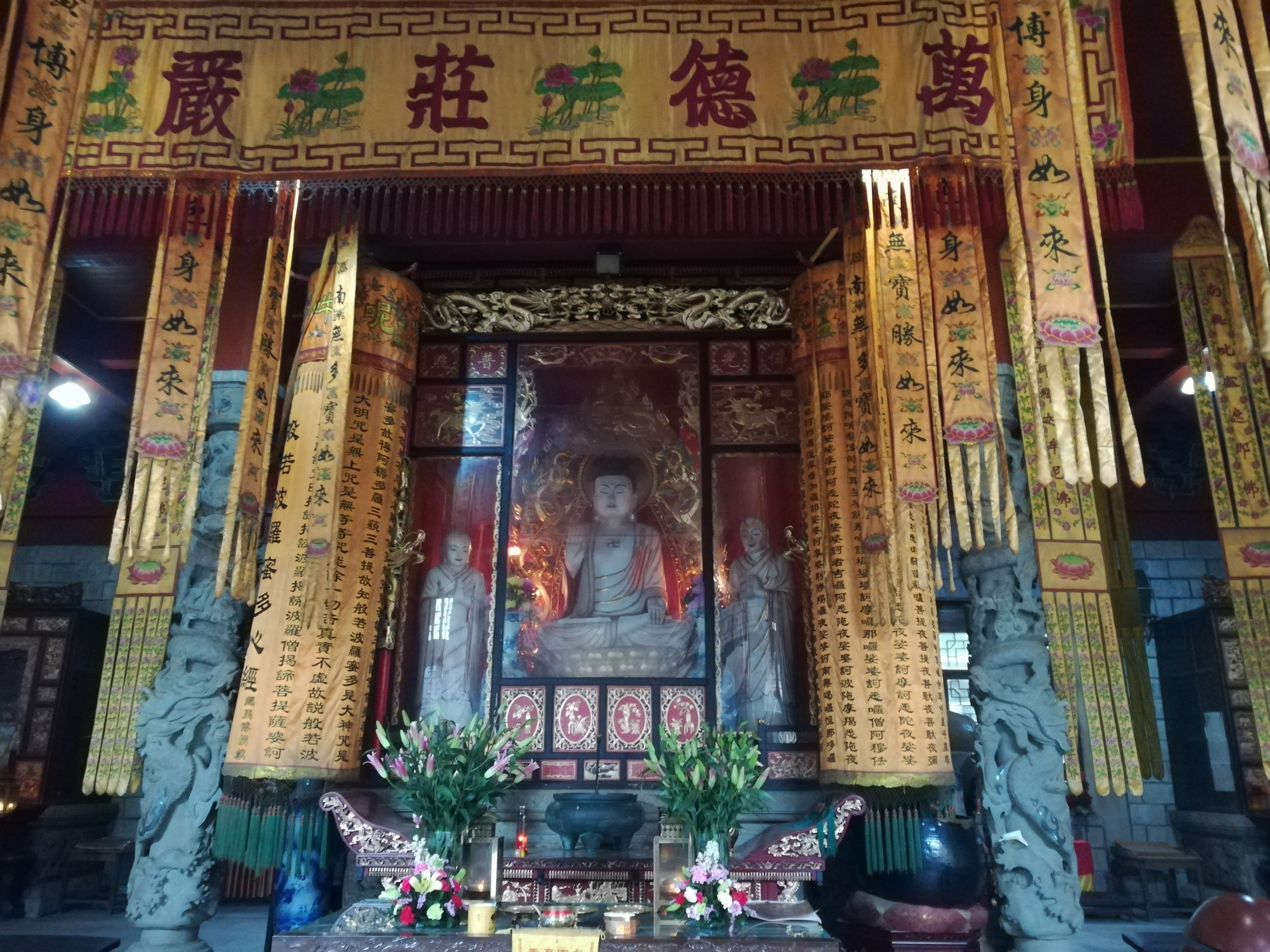
Statue of Gautama Buddha at Shangfeng Temple.
