= Grand Temple of Mount Heng =

Buddhist temple in Hunan, China

Coordinates: 27°14′56″N 112°43′43″E

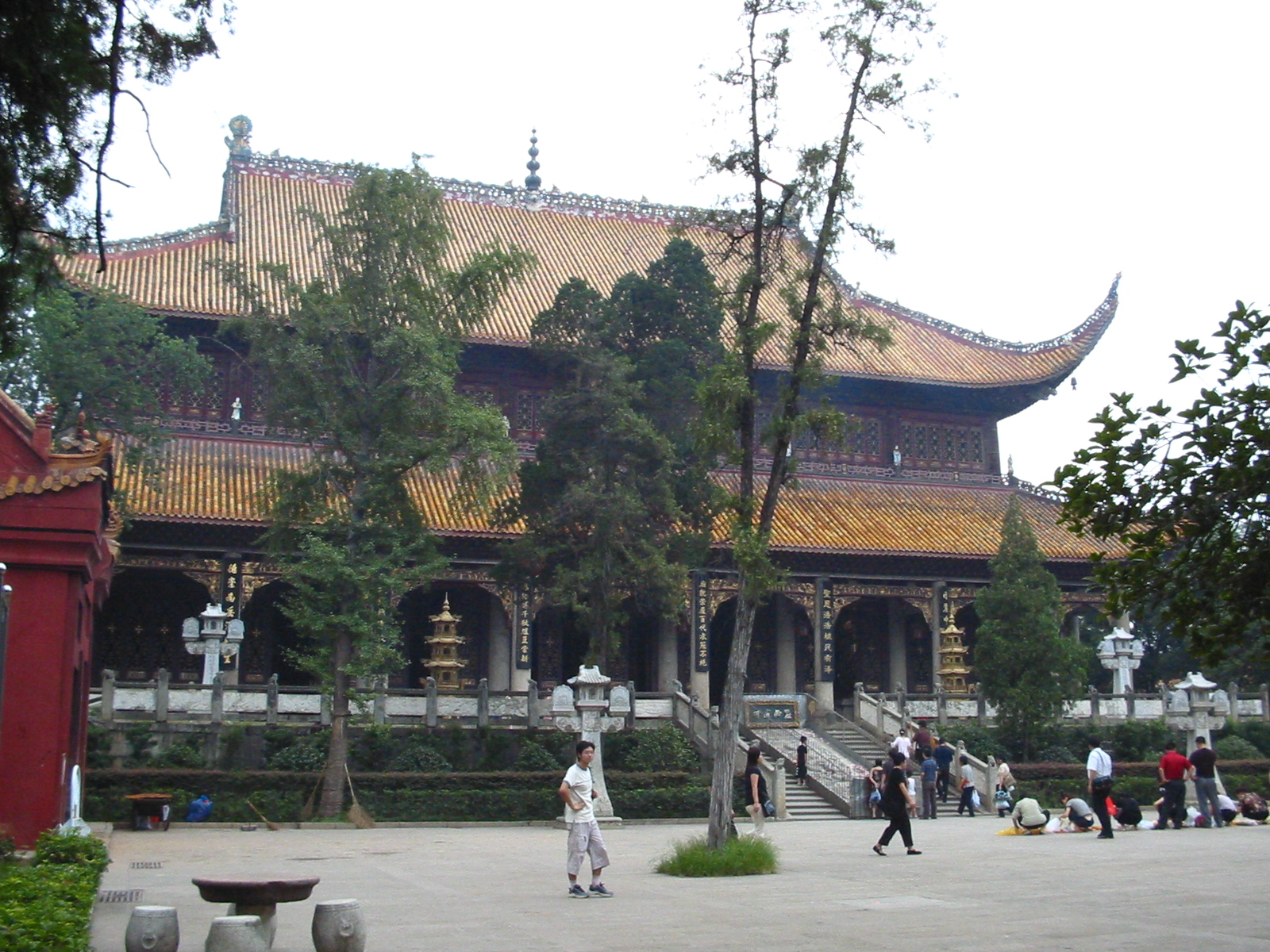
The Grand Hall

The Grand Temple of Mount Heng, or Grand Temple of South Mountain (Chinese: 南岳大庙; pinyin: Nányuè Dàmiào) is located at the foot of Mount Heng, and on the north of ancient town of Mount Heng in Hengshan County of Hunan, China. It is the largest temple on Mount Heng. It is a major component of Mount Heng National Key Tourist Resort Zone.

== History ==
The Grand Temple was initially called Heaven Governor Huo King Temple (司天霍王庙), and later, the name changed to South Heaven Genuine Master Temple (南天真君祠). Its founding year is unknown. The earliest documented records show that it was built in 725 CE during the Tang dynasty. The temple lived through the Song, Yuan, Ming and Qing dynasties despite suffering six fires and undergoing 16 large-scale renovations. At the end of the Ming dynasty, the temple was burnt down. In 1882 during the Qing dynasty, the temple was rebuilt following the layout of Forbidden City in Beijing, thus it was also called "Little Palace in South China". The majority of the buildings have been preserved till today. During the Cultural Revolution, all temples were regarded as engendering the values of the "Four Olds", and suffered devastating destruction. The valuable historical stone tablets, inscribed boards, Buddhist statues and scriptures were all destroyed. Starting in 1980s, continuous renovation projects have rehabilitated destroyed buildings and statues.

== Architecture ==
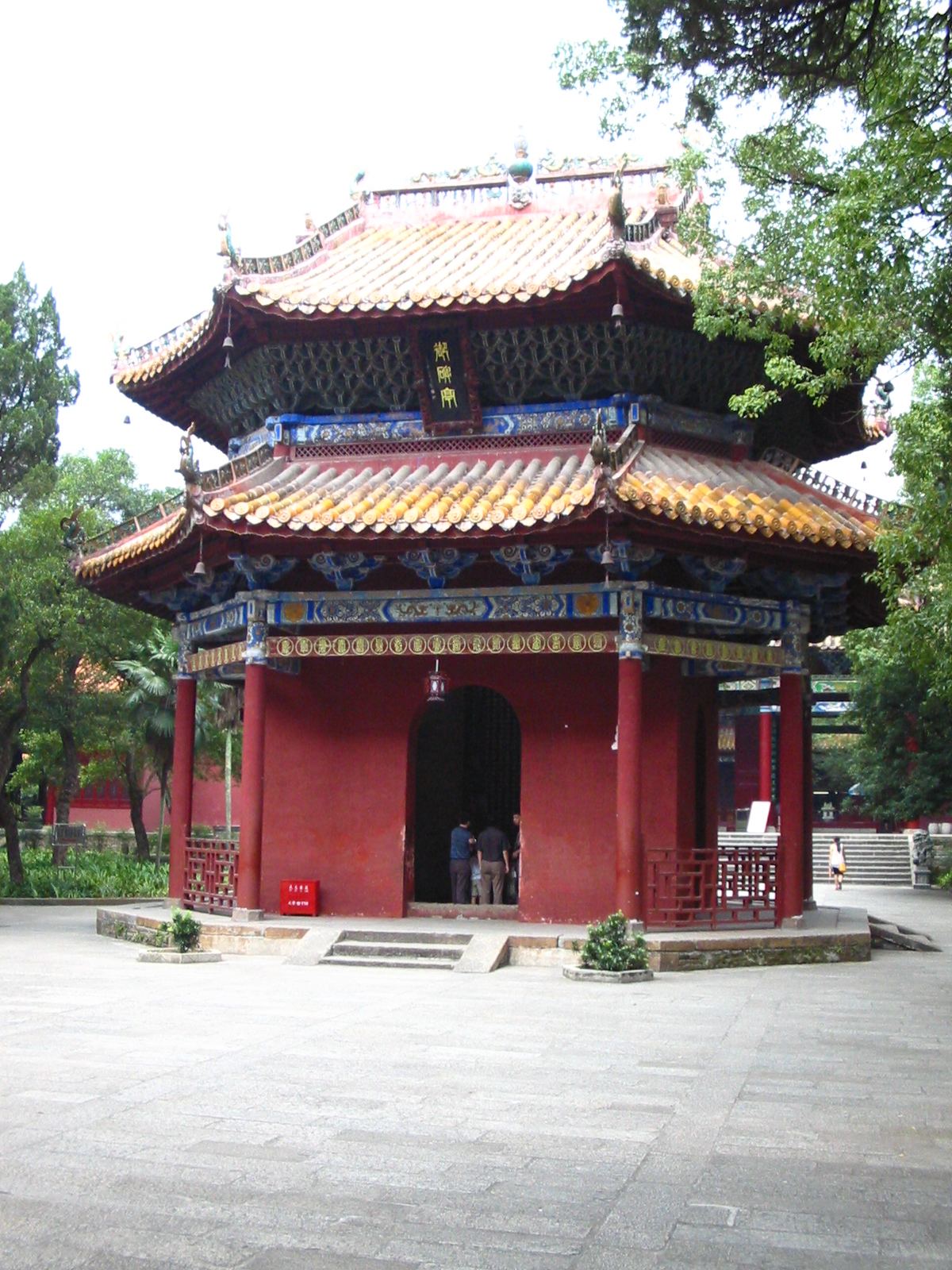

The temple covers a land area of over 98,500 m^{2}. Along its axis there are nine major buildings. From south to north, they are Lingxing Gate, Kuixing Pavilion, Zhengchuan Gate, Imperial Tablet Pavilion, Jiaying Gate, Imperial Library Tower, Grand Hall, Refreshing Palace and North Hind Gate. Its eastern and western sides accommodate Eight Temples of Taoism and Eight Temples of Buddhism.

The name of Lingxing Gate means abundant talents emerge and serve the country. Usually, "Lingxing" wouldn't be used to name a temple gate. There are only two exceptions in China, and the other Lingxing Gate is in the Temple of Confucius. Kuixing Pavilion is also called "Panlong Pavilion" (literally, Circling Dragon Pavilion). It has double-eave two-curve roof and covers 139 m^{2}. It serves as an opera stage.

There is a tablet in Imperial Tablet Pavilion bestowed by the Kangxi Emperor, on which "Temple of Mount Heng Renovation Memorial" was inscribed, comprising 279 characters written by the emperor himself. The first sentence reads, "Mount Heng is the giant pillar in South. It corresponds to Star Yu Heng of Big Dipper, and is also called Mount Longevity." Mount Heng's another name, Mount Longevity, was thereafter determined by the authority. The original tablet was destroyed in the Cultural Revolution.

== Culture ==
Three religions, Buddhism, Taoism and Confucianism, co-exist in the Grand Temple of Mount Heng. Eight Temples of Taoism, Eight Temples of Buddhism and the Imperial Library Tower represent the convergence of three religions. The temple enjoys great popularity among devotees. Large Buddhist festivals are held on Buddhist holidays each year. Pilgrims come not only from nearby Hunan and Guangdong, but also from Hong Kong, Macao, Southeast Asia and Japan. There was originally a statue of Mountain God (Yue Shen) in the Grand Hall, to which the past emperors all paid tribute. In the early Tang dynasty, the god was designated "Heavenly Governor Huo King". In the Kaiyuan era of the Tang dynasty, he was titled "Genuine Master of Mount Heng". In the Song dynasty, he was named "Heavenly Governor Zhaosheng Emperor". The "Superior Emperor of Mount Heng" extant today was rebuilt in 1983, for the original statue was destroyed in the Cultural Revolution. There are also two "Treasury Houses" on each side of the Grand Hall. Facing the hall, the one on the left side is designed for worship by living people, while the one on the right hosts the name boards of the deceased.

In 1990, the Chinese National Post Bureau issued a series of Mount Heng stamps (T155), comprising four pieces. The first one, "Grand Temple", depicted this temple.
