= Fuyan Temple =

Buddhist temple on Mount Heng, China

- 福严寺
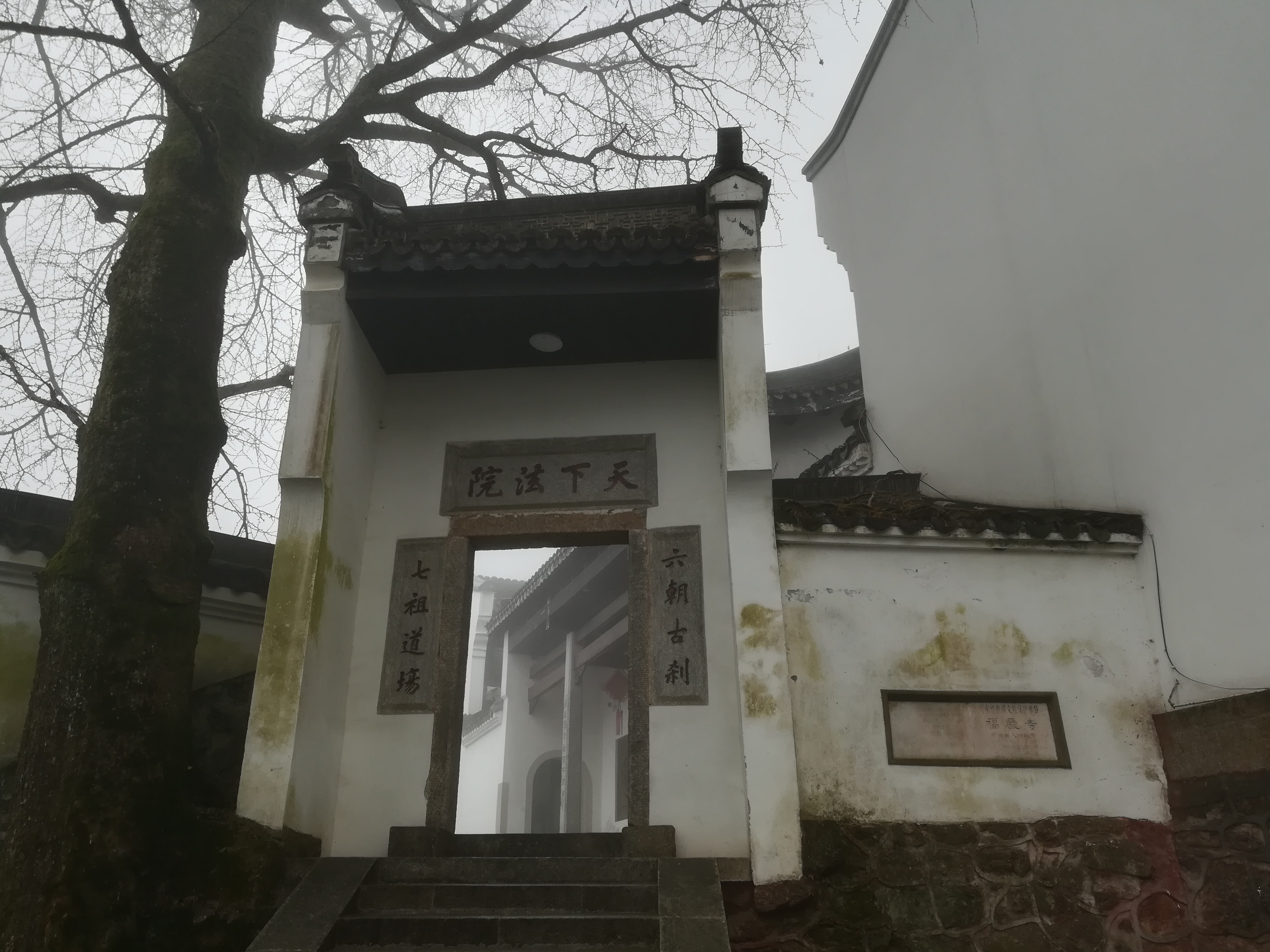
- The Shanmen of Fuyan Temple.

- Location within Hunan

Religion
- Affiliation: Buddhism
- Sect: Chan Buddhism
- District: Nanyue District
- Prefecture: Hengyang
- Province: Hunan

Location
- Country: China
- Prefecture: Hengyang
- Coordinates: 27°16′11″N 112°42′35″E

Architecture
- Style: Chinese architecture
- Founder: Nanyue Huisi
- Established: 567

Fuyan Temple (simplified Chinese: 福严寺; traditional Chinese: 福嚴寺; pinyin: Fúyán Sì) is a Buddhist temple located on Mount Heng, in Nanyue District of Hengyang, Hunan, China. It has been designated as a National Key Buddhist Temple in Han Chinese Area in 1983.

== History ==
The construction of the temple, originally named "Bore Chan Temple" (般若禅寺) or "Bore Temple" (般若寺), was initiated in 567 by Nanyue Huisi during the Six Dynasties period (222-589).

During the Zhenguan period (627-649) of Tang dynasty (618-907), Emperor Taizong of Tang gave 50 volumes of Buddhist scriptures to the temple. In 713, in the 2nd year of Xiantian period, Nanyue Huairang came here and served as its abbot.

During the Taiping Xingguo period of Song dynasty (960-1279), Emperor Taizong of Song inscribed and honored the name "Fuyan Temple", and the name has been retained today.

In 1870, in the 9th year of Tongzhi period of Qing dynasty (1644-1911), the local government reconstructed the temple.

In 1983, it has been categorized as a National Key Buddhist Temple in Han Chinese Area.

== Architecture ==
Fuyan Temple has more than 10 buildings and halls, the well-preserved buildings include the shanmen, the Hall of Holy Emperor of Mount Heng, the Mahavira Hall, the Abbot's Room, the Fatang, the Zushi Dian, the Zangjing Ge, the Meditation Hall, and the Huayan Pavilion.

=== Hall of Holy Emperor of Mount Heng ===
The Hall of Holy Emperor of Mount Heng is the third hall of the temple for the worship of the Holy Emperor of Mount Heng (岳神).

=== Ginkgo trees ===
The temple has four old ginkgo trees. One of them is already 1400 years old.

=== Mahavira Hall ===
The Mahavira Hall is the fourth hall in the temple. Statues of Horizontal Three-Life Buddha are enshrined in the hall, namely Shijiamouni (middle), Amituofo (right) and Yaoshi (left). The statue of Horizontal Three-Life Buddha are enshrined in the center with Eighteen Arhats lining up on both sides.

== Gallery ==
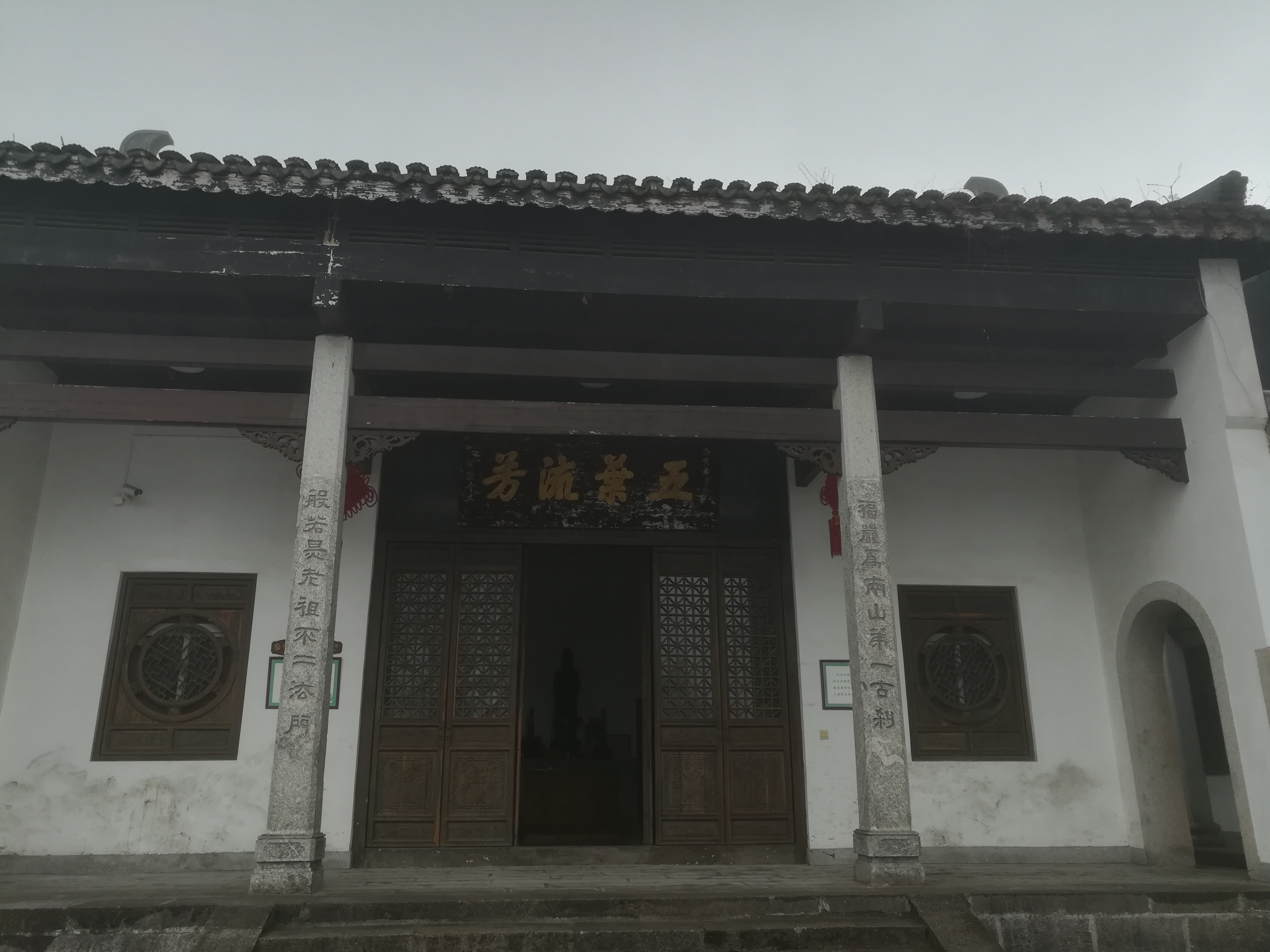
The Zhike Hall.

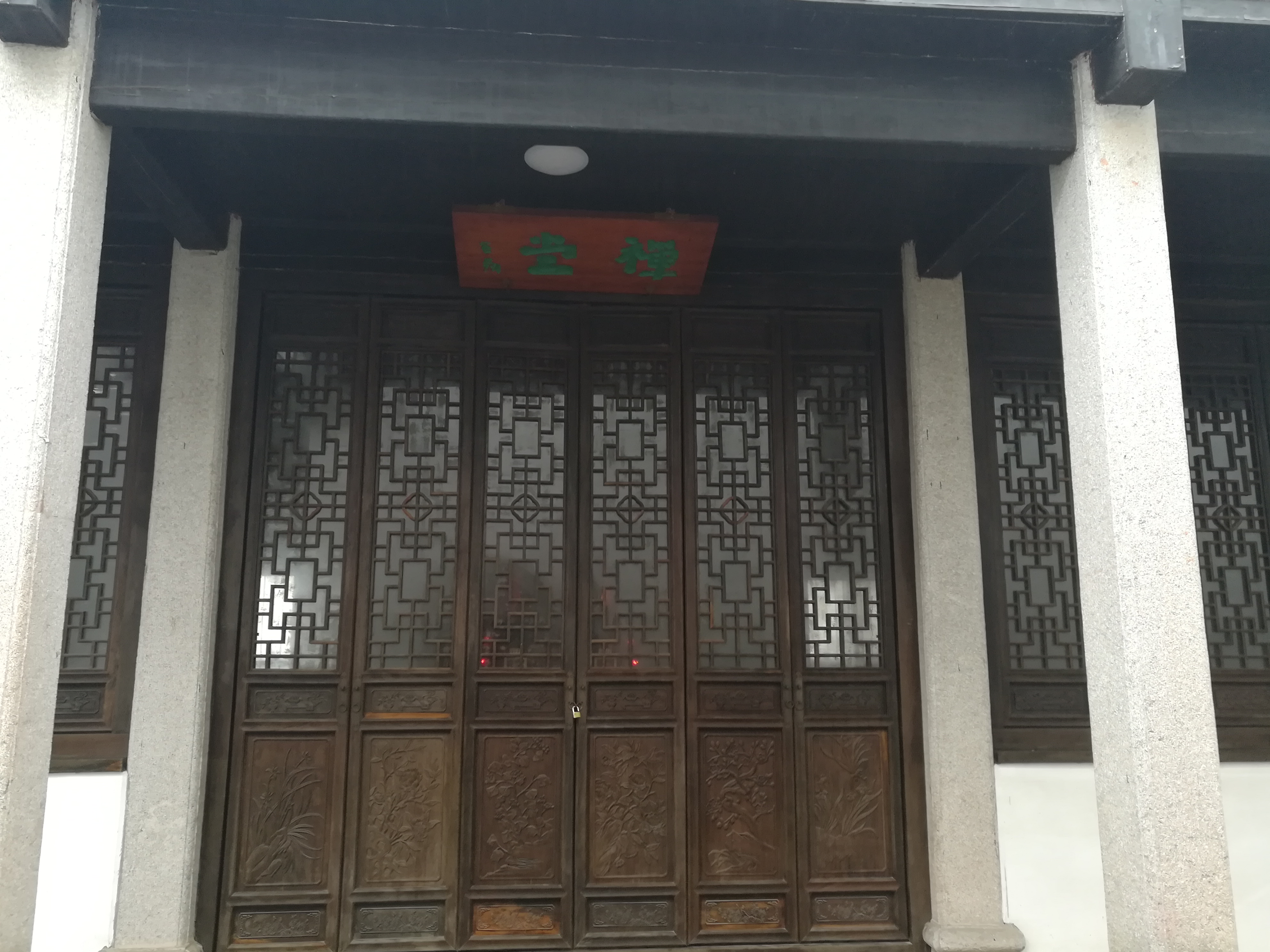
The Meditation Hall.

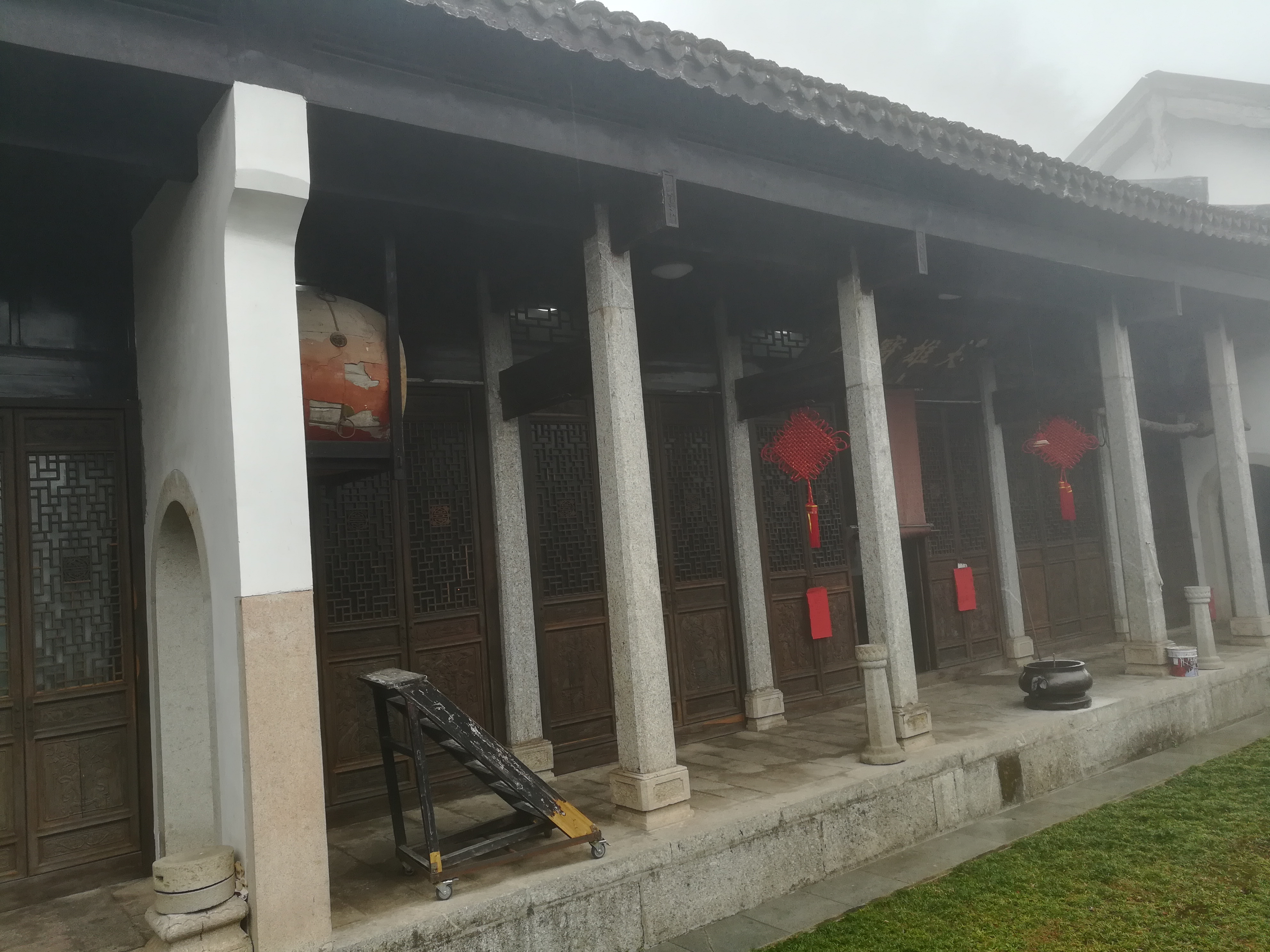
The Mahavira Hall.

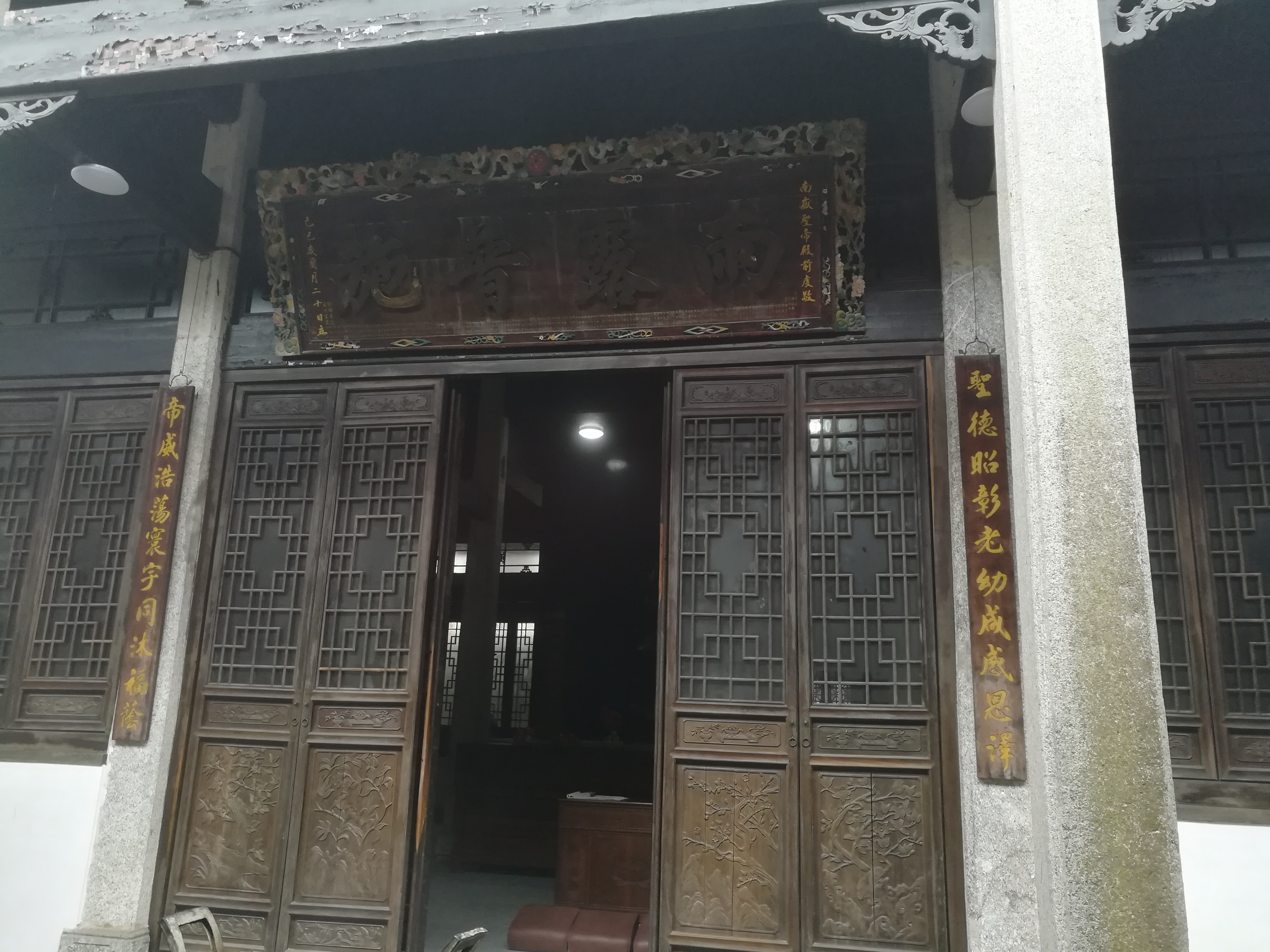
The Hall of Holy Emperor of Mount Heng.
