= National Teacher's College =

University in Hunan, China

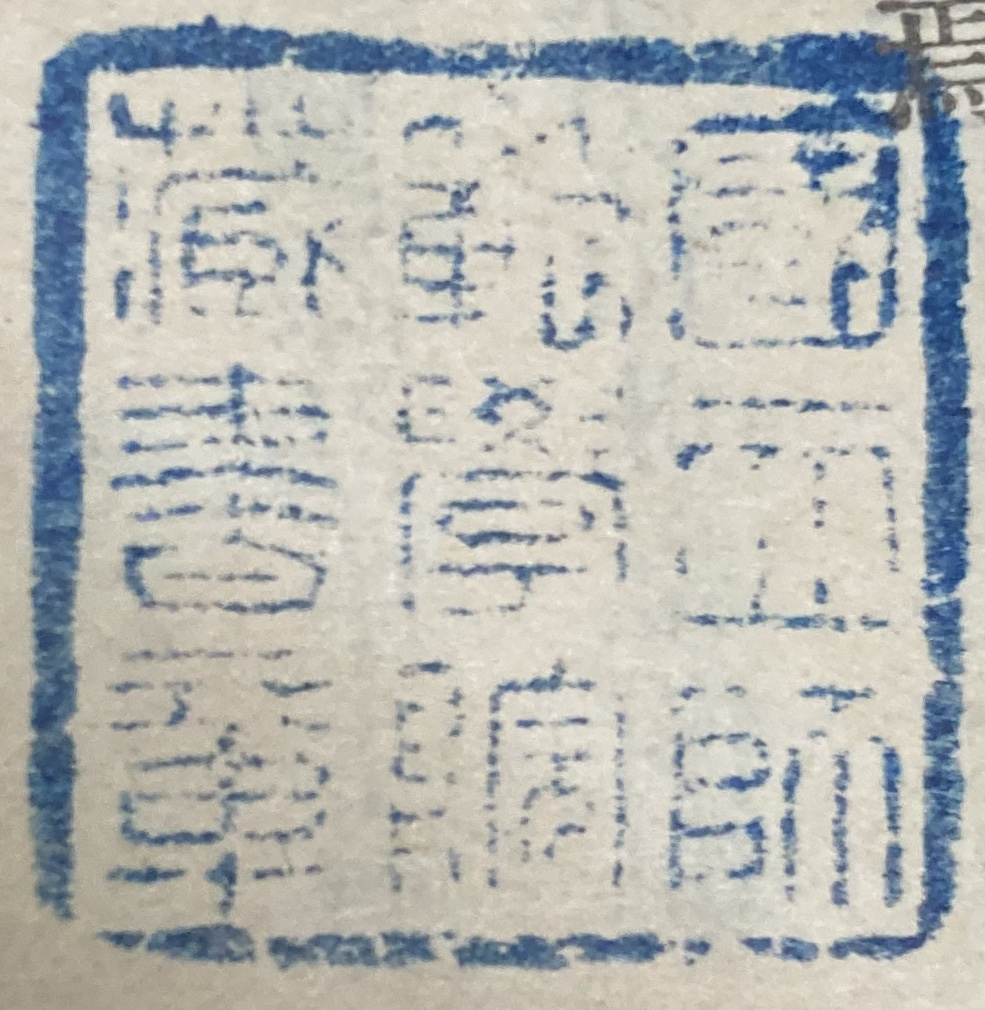
A library stamp from a book once owned by the National Teacher's College

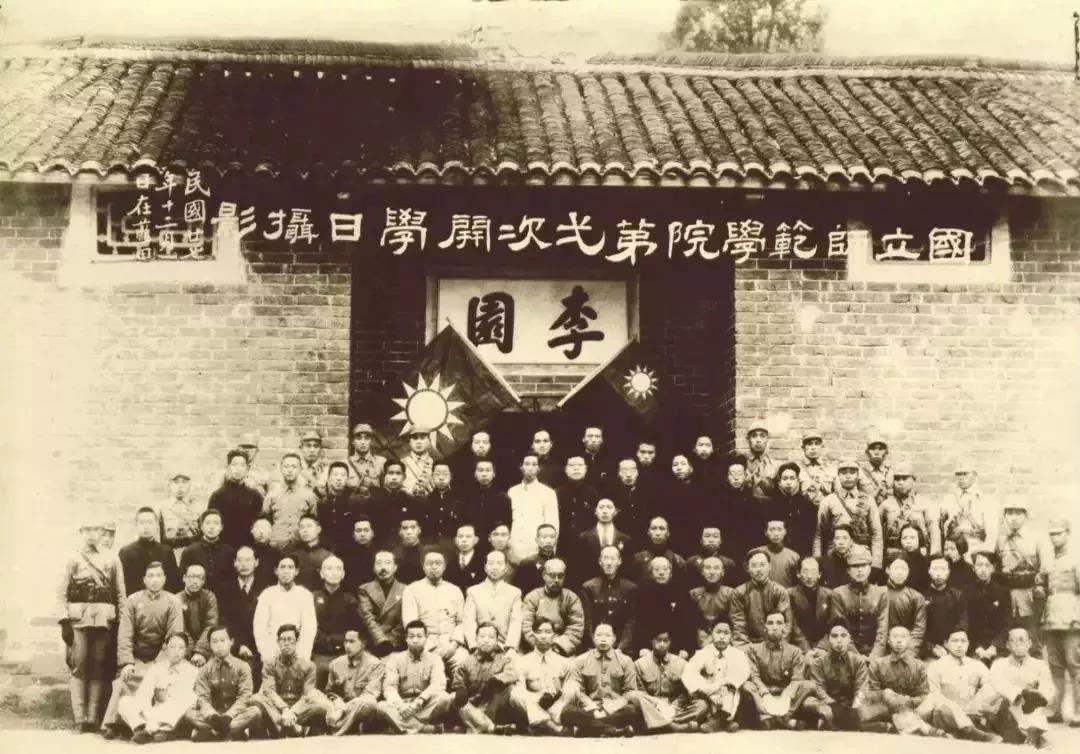
國立師範學院第一次開學日攝影

The National Teacher's College (國立師範學院) was a university based in Hunan, China. It is considered the predecessor to Hunan Normal University. It was established on October 27, 1938, during the Second Sino-Japanese War. The college was originally located in Lantian, Anhua County, and later moved to Luopu County. After the Second Sino-Japanese War, it moved to Hengshan County.

The college was originally planned to be moved to the capital city of Nanjing and renamed "National Central Normal University", but this was not realised due to political factors. In December 1949, the school was merged into the National Hunan University. In 1952, Hunan University itself was revoked, and the Central South School of Civil Engineering and Architecture and Hunan Normal University (based on the original National Normal University) were established in its place.
