= Hengshan County =

Hengshan County 衡山县
- County
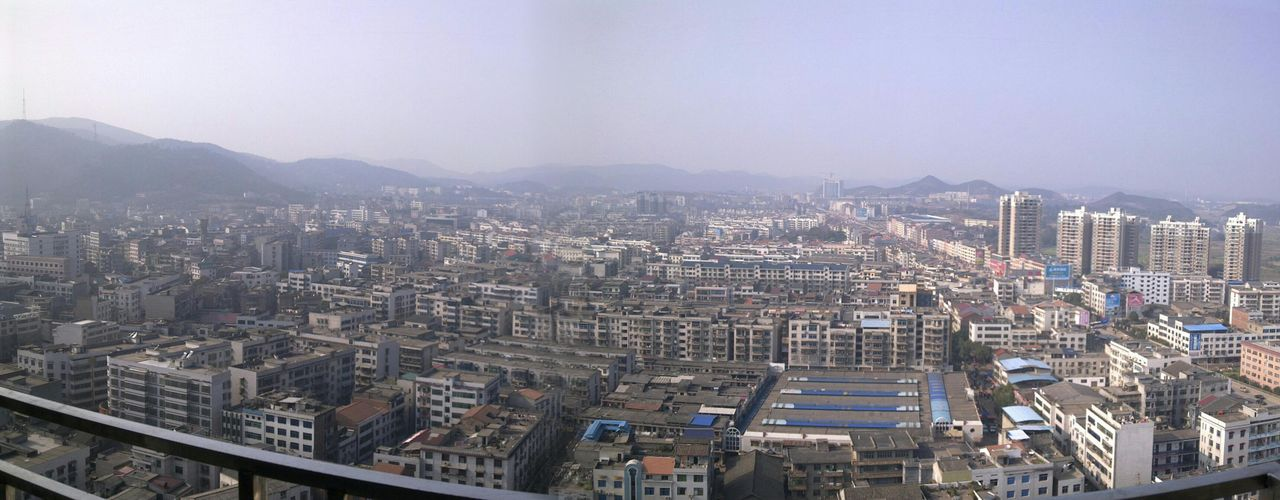
- Kaiyun Town

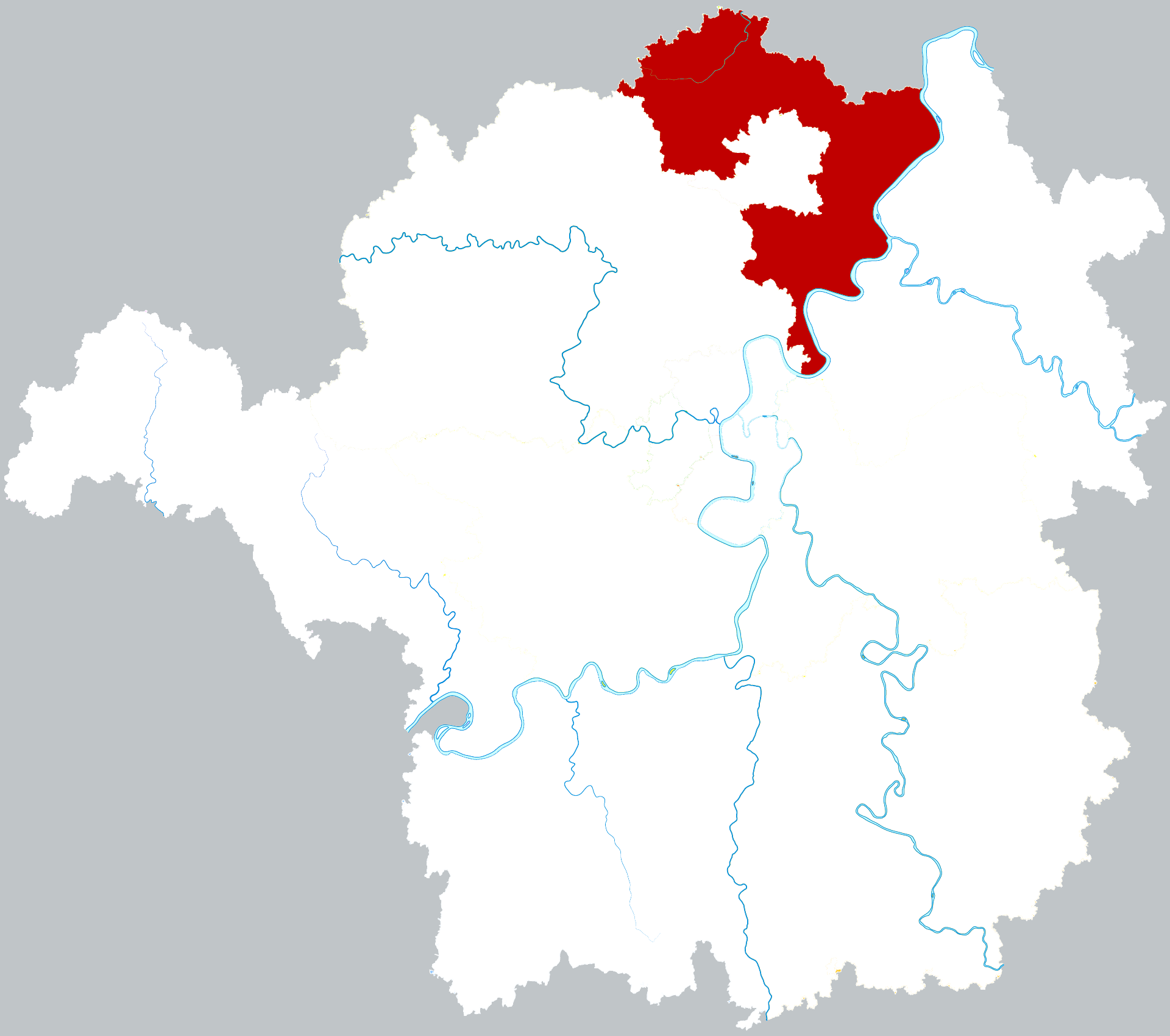
- Location in Hengyang

- Location in Hunan
- Coordinates: 27°13′49″N 112°52′06″E
- Country: People's Republic of China
- Province: Hunan
- Prefecture-level city: Hengyang
- Time zone: UTC+8 (China Standard)

Hengshan County (Chinese: 衡山县; pinyin: Héngshān Xiàn; lit. 'Mount Heng') is a county in the Province of Hunan, China and it is under the administration of Hengyang prefecture-level city. Located in the north of Hengyang and the east-central part of Hunan province, the county is bordered to the north by Xiangtan County, to the northwest by Shuangfeng County, to the southwest and south by Hengyang County, Nanyue District and Hengnan County, to the east by Hengdong County. The county of Hengshan covers 934 km^{2} (361 sq mi) with a population of 449,500 (as of 2015). It has five townships and seven towns under its jurisdiction, the county seat is Kaiyun Town (开云镇).

== History ==
The county of Hengshan was named after the Hengshan Mountain, the place name of Hengshan was described in the Book of Documents (one of the Five Classics of ancient Chinese literature). It was belonged to the territory of Chu State in the Spring and Autumn period, it was part of Changsha Commandery (长沙郡) in the Qin period and part of Xiangnan County (湘南县) of Changsha State (长沙国) in the Han period. The county of Hengyang (not modern Hengyang County) was created in 257 AD, its seat was located in modern Yonghe Township and the county of Hengyang was renamed to Hengshan in 290 AD. The National Teacher's College was located in the county in the late 1940s.

== Divisions ==
7 towns

- Baiguo (白果镇)
- Changjiang (长江镇)
- Dianmen (店门镇)
- Donghu (东湖镇)
- Kaiyun (开云镇)
- Xinqiao (新桥镇)
- Xuanzhou (萱洲镇)

5 townships

- Futianpu (福田铺乡)
- Guantang (贯塘乡)
- Jiangdong (江东乡)
- Lingpo (岭坡乡)
- Yonghe (永和乡)

== Climate ==
Climate data for Hengshan, elevation 159 m (522 ft), (1991–2020 normals, extremes 1981–2010)
Month	Jan	Feb	Mar	Apr	May	Jun	Jul	Aug	Sep	Oct	Nov	Dec	Year
Record high °C (°F)	26.6 (79.9)	30.8 (87.4)	35.5 (95.9)	36.1 (97.0)	37.4 (99.3)	38.2 (100.8)	39.9 (103.8)	41.2 (106.2)	38.6 (101.5)	35.2 (95.4)	32.0 (89.6)	25.0 (77.0)	41.2 (106.2)
Mean daily maximum °C (°F)	9.4 (48.9)	12.3 (54.1)	16.4 (61.5)	23.1 (73.6)	27.9 (82.2)	31.0 (87.8)	34.6 (94.3)	33.8 (92.8)	29.8 (85.6)	24.4 (75.9)	18.5 (65.3)	12.4 (54.3)	22.8 (73.0)
Daily mean °C (°F)	5.9 (42.6)	8.4 (47.1)	12.2 (54.0)	18.4 (65.1)	23.1 (73.6)	26.7 (80.1)	29.9 (85.8)	29.0 (84.2)	25.0 (77.0)	19.6 (67.3)	13.8 (56.8)	8.1 (46.6)	18.3 (65.0)
Mean daily minimum °C (°F)	3.5 (38.3)	5.8 (42.4)	9.4 (48.9)	15.1 (59.2)	19.7 (67.5)	23.5 (74.3)	26.3 (79.3)	25.6 (78.1)	21.6 (70.9)	16.3 (61.3)	10.6 (51.1)	5.3 (41.5)	15.2 (59.4)
Record low °C (°F)	−4.7 (23.5)	−7.7 (18.1)	−1.0 (30.2)	3.1 (37.6)	10.4 (50.7)	12.8 (55.0)	18.5 (65.3)	18.3 (64.9)	12.7 (54.9)	3.6 (38.5)	−1.1 (30.0)	−9.8 (14.4)	−9.8 (14.4)
Average precipitation mm (inches)	77.3 (3.04)	83.3 (3.28)	164.1 (6.46)	163.2 (6.43)	213.7 (8.41)	207.9 (8.19)	133.3 (5.25)	105.2 (4.14)	70.4 (2.77)	59.7 (2.35)	80.6 (3.17)	60.3 (2.37)	1,419 (55.86)
Average precipitation days (≥ 0.1 mm)	14.6	14.8	18.8	16.9	16.5	15.3	10.1	10.8	8.3	8.9	10.5	10.5	156
Average snowy days	3.7	1.8	0.4	0	0	0	0	0	0	0	0.1	1.3	7.3
Average relative humidity (%)	81	81	83	80	79	80	73	75	76	75	78	77	78
Mean monthly sunshine hours	54.0	56.3	67.6	96.0	127.8	132.7	228.8	193.3	147.2	123.7	105.9	88.0	1,421.3
Percentage possible sunshine	16	18	18	25	31	32	54	48	40	35	33	27	31
Source: China Meteorological Administration

== Economy ==
According to preliminary accounting of the statistical authority, the gross domestic product of Hengshan County in 2017 was 16,722 million yuan (2,477 million US dollars), up by 8.6 percent over the previous year. Of this total, the value added of the primary industry was 3,210 million yuan (475 million US dollars), up by 3.3 percent, that of the secondary industry was 4,634 million yuan (686 million US dollars), up by 6.6 percent and that of the tertiary industry was 8,878 million yuan (1,315 million US dollars), up by 11.8 percent. The value added of the primary industry accounted for 19.20 percent of the GDP; that of the secondary industry accounted for 27.71 percent; and that of the tertiary industry accounted for 53.09 percent. The per capita GDP in 2017 was 43,416 yuan (6,430 US dollars).
