= Kaiyun Town =

Kaiyun 开云镇
- Town
- Location within Hunan
- Coordinates: 27°14′24″N 112°51′50″E
- Country: People's Republic of China
- Province: Hunan
- Prefecture-level city: Hengyang
- County: Hengshan
- Administrative centre: Shiguqiao Village
- Divisions: 17 villages and 8 communities

Area
  - Total: 136.51 km^{2} (52.71 sq mi)

Population (2016)
  - Total: 110,964
  - Density: 812.86/km^{2} (2,105.3/sq mi)
- Time zone: UTC+8 (China Standard)
- Area code: 0734
- Languages: Standard Chinese, Hengzhou Hunanese
- Website: http://www.hengshan.gov.cn/kyz/ (Chinese)

Kaiyun Town (simplified Chinese: 开云镇; traditional Chinese: 開雲鎮; pinyin: Kāiyún Zhèn) is a town and the seat of Hengshan County in the province of Hunan, China. The town has an area of 136.51 km^{2} (52.71 sq mi) with a population of 110,964 (as of 2016 census). It has 17 villages and 8 communities under its jurisdiction, and its seat is Shiguqiao Village (师古桥村).

== History ==
The name of Kaiyun means that the watery clouds went out of sight or disappeared. It is said that Han Yu, a great writer in the Tang dynasty came to Hengshan County. He wanted to climb the Mount Hengshan, but it had been raining and covering the mountains with clouds and fog. He recited poems and prayed, and it turned out to be cloudless and sunny. After that, a building named Kaiyun Tower (开云楼) was set up in the place of his poetry in memory of the great writer.

== Subdivisions ==
Administrative divisions of Kaiyun Town
divisions					the amalgamation of village-lvevel divisions in 2016	
English	Chinese	area	population	residential groups	English	Chinese
Chang'an Village	长安村	12.30	4,362	29	combination of Banqiao, Shenchong, Pingtang and Qingshan villages	板桥村、神冲村、坪塘村、青山村合并
Yuejin Village	跃进村	8.72	3,499	28	combination of Yuejin and Longquan villages	跃进村、龙泉村合并
Shanzhu Village	山竹村	9.67	3,790	29	combination of Shanzhu and Guanghui villages	山竹村、光辉村合并
Hengxi Village	衡西村	6.15	3,192	24	combination of Xinping and Datang villages	新坪村、大塘村合并
Shiguqiao Village	师古桥村	3.51	2,625	17	combination of Yuefeng and Shigu villages	岳峰村、师古村合并
Jiansheng Village	建胜村	5.90	3,521	21	combination of Jiansheng and Jiangyong villages	建胜村、江永村合并
Shuangquan Xincun Village	双全新村	6.70	2,722	26	the merger of Shangjiao, Shuangqua Village, Wangchong and Shuikous	上角村、双全村、旺冲村、水口村合并
Shishang Village	世上村	8.47	3,549	30	combination Shishang, Shishi and Liushu villages	世上村、石狮村、柳树村合并
Jinshi Village	金石村	3.72	1,832	16	combination of Jintai and Shitai villages	金台村、石台村合并
Xinfu Village	幸福村	7.17	3,477	34	combination of Zhongfu and Xingfu villages	种福村、幸福村合并
Shantian Village	山田村	6.17	2,413	29	combination of Jianhua and Shantian villages	建华村、山田村合并
Xiannong Community	先农社区	1.71	8,156	14	combination of Beiwangqiao and Xiannong communities	北望桥社区、先农社区合并
Jinxi Community	金溪社区	4.36	2,677	14	combination of Jinlong and Huanxi villages	金龙村、环溪村合并
Lianglukou Community	两路口社区	8.28	9,930	23	combination of Lianglukou Community, Jinshi and Paitang villages	两路口社区、金狮村、排塘村合并
Dongfeng Community	东风社区	6.03	6,389	44	combination of Dongfeng Community, Xiangheng and Guanxiang villages	东风社区、湘衡村、观湘村合并
Shaquan Community	沙泉社区	3.84	3,658	28	combination of Shaquan Community, Jiantang, Jietang, Rujia and Quanshui villages	沙泉社区、建塘村、界塘村、茹家村、泉水村合并
Guihua Village	桂花村	3.33	2,448	17		
Jiulong Village	九龙村	3.68	2,452	11		
Yueshi Village	岳狮村	3.69	1,543	14		
Longzhu Village	龙珠村	3.20	1,313	8		
Bali Village	八里村	5.79	3,118	19		
Qingfeng Village	青峰村	9.24	2,512	17		
Gantangqiao Community	甘棠桥社区	2.16	10,229	21		
Zijin Community	紫巾社区	0.62	8,744	17		
Daqiao Community	大桥社区	2.10	12,813	14		
total		136.51	110,964	544		
