= Zhao Shenqiao =

Qing dynasty politician (1644–1720)

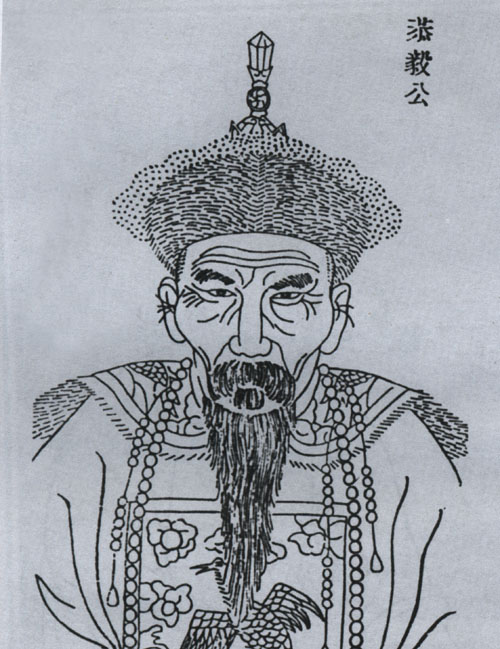
- Portrait from 1917 publication 《寺庄赵氏宗谱》

Minister of Revenue
- In office November 19, 1713 – May 28, 1720
- Preceded by: Zhang Penghe
- Succeeded by: Tian Congdian

Personal details
- Born: July 21, 1644; Wujin, Jiangsu
- Died: November 21, 1720 (aged 88)

Zhao Shenqiao (Chinese: 趙申喬; pinyin: Zhào shēnqiáo; Wade–Giles: Chao Shên-ch’iao, 21 July 1644 – 21 November 1720) was a Han Chinese politician of the Qing dynasty.

== Biography ==
Zhao Shenqiao
- Traditional Chinese: 趙申喬
- Simplified Chinese: 赵申乔
Transcriptions
Standard Mandarin
- Hanyu Pinyin: Zhào shēnqiáo

Posthumous name
- Chinese: 恭毅
Transcriptions
Standard Mandarin
- Hanyu Pinyin: Gōngyì

Zhao hailed from Wujin, Jiangsu and was a descendant of the Song imperial family. He grew up in a poor family, with his father giving up his official career in 1642 to teach. Nevertheless, Zhao excelled in his studies, obtaining a jinshi degree in the imperial examination in 1670. He waited eleven years before he was finally given an appointment as magistrate of Shangqiu, Henan. In 1688, he was appointed second-class assistant secretary in the Board of Punishments. He was offered another promotion in 1694, but declined to accept on account of illness. In 1701, Zhao was granted an audience with the Kangxi Emperor, who made him financial commissioner of Zhejiang on Li Guangdi's recommendation. While in office, Zhao strove to be incorruptible and he gained 'universal renown' for his honesty and incorruptibility.

He was rewarded with governorship of Zhejiang in 1702. Later the same year, he was sent to Hunan to investigate a Miao rebellion that had not been properly reported to the imperial court by local officials when it began in 1700. Zhao ended up becoming governor of Hunan in 1703, helping assist in the suppression of the Miao. He was also specifically instructed by the emperor to root out the perceived corrupt officialdom in the province. During his time as governor, historian R. Kent Guy observed that Zhao had 'laid the foundation for a more orderly society in the province by correcting inequalities in land tax assessments, increasing grain supplies, and encouraging the cultivation of new lands.'

In 1711, Zhao was made president of the Censorate. He served there until 1713 when he was sent to Guangdong to supervise relief for a famine that had stricken the province. Later in 1713, Zhao was made Minister of Revenue. Although Zhao repeatedly begged to retire, he served as an official until his death in 1720. He was honoured with the posthumous name Gongyi (恭毅) and his name was enshrined in the Temple of Eminent Statesmen in 1730. His collected works were printed by his grandson in 1737.
