= Nanyue, Hengyang =

Nanyue 南岳区
- District
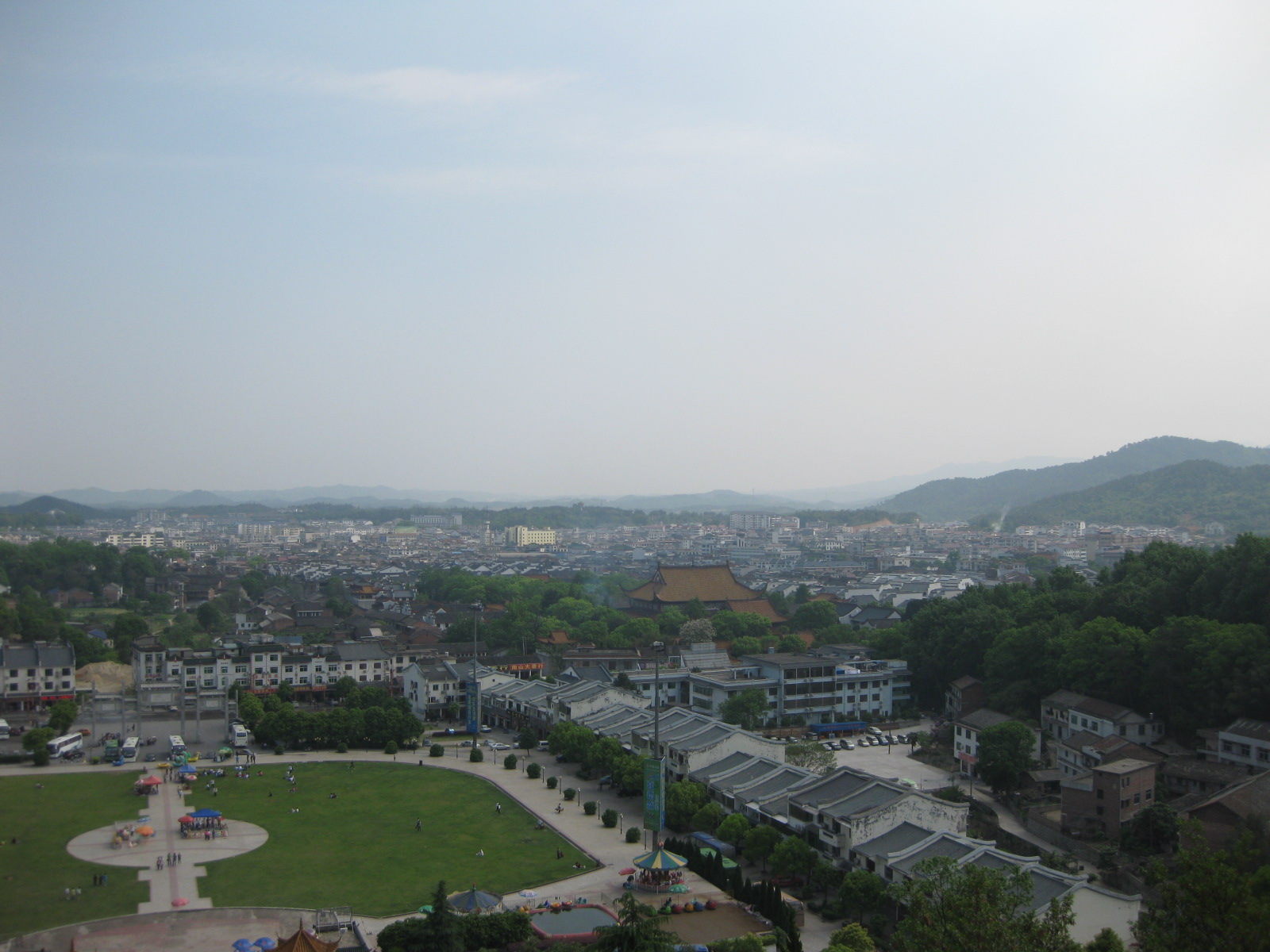

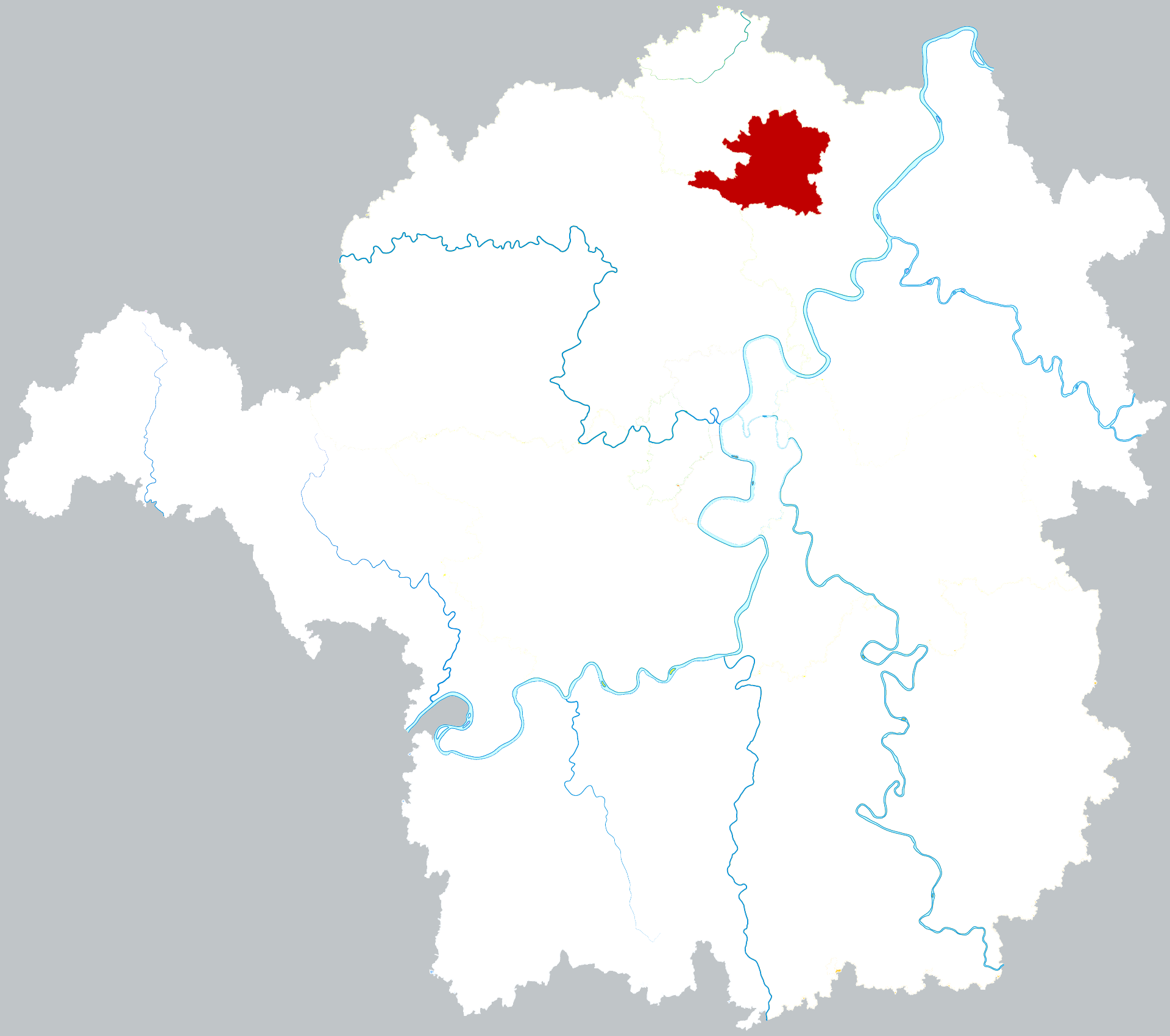
- Location in Hengyang

- Location in Hunan
- Coordinates: 27°13′57″N 112°44′20″E
- Country: China
- Province: Hunan
- Prefecture-level city: Hengyang
- District seat: Nanyue

Area
  - Total: 181.5 km^{2} (70.1 sq mi)

Population (2020 census)
  - Total: 70,370
  - Density: 387.7/km^{2} (1,004/sq mi)
- Time zone: UTC+8 (China Standard)
- Website: www.nanyue.gov.cn

Nanyue District (simplified Chinese: 南岳区; traditional Chinese: 南嶽區; pinyin: Nányuè Qū) is one of five districts in Hengyang City, Hunan Province, China. It is the 2nd smallest district by population (after Wulingyuan District) in Hunan. Nanyue District is a rural district about 45 kilometres away from the city proper of Hengyang. As the location of the Mount Heng, Nanyue is currently one of the main tourist destinations in Hunan, and also South China.

Nanyue means the South Great Mountain, the nickname of Mount Heng. The district is named after the Mount Heng, which is one of the Five Great Mountains in China.

Nanyue was formed from parts of Hengshan County in 1984, it was incorporated as a district in the base of the Mount Heng which is one of famous historical and cultural scenic spots in China.

The district is located in the south eastern Hunan and the north of Hengyang. It is surrounded to the north, the east and the south by Hengshan County, and to the west by Hengdong County. Nanyue District covers an area of 181.5 km^{2} (70.1 sq mi), and as of 2015, it had a resident population of 62,700. The district has a subdistrict, a town and a township under its jurisdiction, and the government seat is at Zhurong Subdistrict (祝融街道).

== History ==
In December 1951, Mount Heng and its nearby mountainous areas were designated from Hengshan County to Nanyue Special Region (南岳特别区) newly created. In July 1952, Nanyue Special Region was dissolved and was incorporated into Hengshan County.

In April 1960, the Nanyue Administration (南岳管理局) was upgraded to a county-level administrative unit. The former Nanyue Commune (南岳公社) was divided into the Nanyue Commune and Nanyue Town (南岳镇), which were hosted by the Nanyue Administration. In March 1961, the authority of Nanyue Administration divided the Nanyue Commune into four people's communes of Nanyue, Dianmen (店门), Zhurong (祝融) and Shigu (师古), the town of Nanyue remained unchanged. In November of the same year, 10 communes of Xinqiao(新桥), Maji (马迹), Donghu, (东湖) Jiangdong (江东), Guantang (贯塘), Baiguo (白果), Songbai (松柏), Wangfeng (望峰), Guandi (贯底) and Tangxing (棠兴) were assigned to the Nanyue Administration mandating.

In June 1963, the Nanyue Administration was reorganized as Nanyue County (南岳县), which governed 15 communities (towns) of the former Nanyue Administration. In February 1966, Nanyue County was repealed and its administrative divisions were placed in Hengshan County. In May 1984, Nanyue District was established from Nanyue Town, Nanyue Township, 10 villages in the three townships of Donghu, Maji and Wangfeng located in the foothills of Mount Heng in Hengshan County, the district is directly under the jurisdiction of Hengyang.

== Geography ==
Nanyue District stands on the north side of the city proper in Hengyang, it is situated in the hilly and mountainous area of the central Hunan in the northwest of the Xiang River. Located between the longitude of 112°45′- 112°50′E and the latitude of 27°12′- 27°40′N, the district is 136 km (85 mi) north of Changsha and 45 km (28 mi) south of Hengyang. Its total area is 181.5 km^{2} (70.1 sq mi), of which the central scenic spot area is 100.7 km^{2} (38.9 sq mi) square kilometers (48.5 km^{2} (18.7 sq mi) for the first-grade protection area and 52.2 km^{2} (20.2 sq mi) for the second grade protection area), accounting for 1.188% of the total area of Hengyang.

== Administrative divisions ==
Nanyue has 1 subdistrict, 1 town and 1 township under its jurisdiction:

Zhurong Subdistrict (祝融街道), Nanyue Town (南岳镇), Shouyue Township (寿岳乡)

== Population ==
As of 2017 (year end), the permanent population of the district was 63,800. Of which, the urban population is 44200, the rural population is 19600, and the urbanization rate is 69.28%. The annual birth population is 978, the birth rate is 15.81‰; the death toll is 261, and the death rate is 4.22‰; the natural growth rate of population is 11.59‰.
