= Mount Heng (Hunan) =

Sacred mountain in Hunan, China

- 衡山
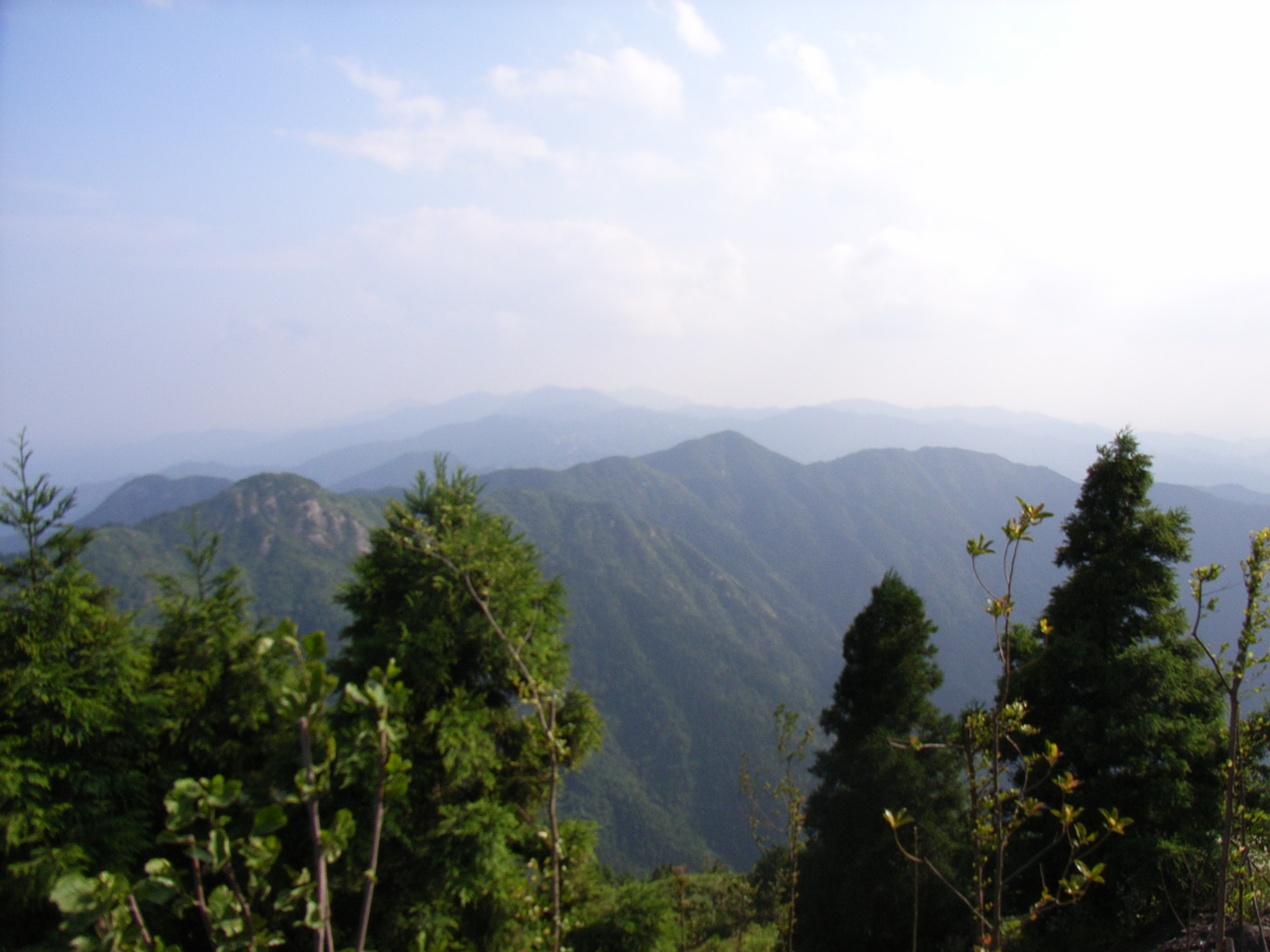
- Mount Heng

Highest point
- Elevation: 1,300.2 m (4,266 ft)
- Prominence: 1,130 m (3,710 ft)
- Listing: Mountains of China

Geography
- Location within Hunan
- Country: China
- Province: Hunan
- Parent range: Hengshan Mountains

Geology
- Rock type: Granite

Mount Heng
- "Mount Heng" in Chinese characters
- Chinese: 衡山
Transcriptions
Standard Mandarin
- Hanyu Pinyin: Héng shān
- IPA: [xə̌ŋ ʂán]
Wu
- Romanization: Oen^{上} se^{平}
Yue: Cantonese
- Yale Romanization: Hàhng sāan
- Jyutping: Hang4 saan1
Southern Min
- Hokkien POJ: Hêng-soaⁿ
- Tâi-lô: Hîng san

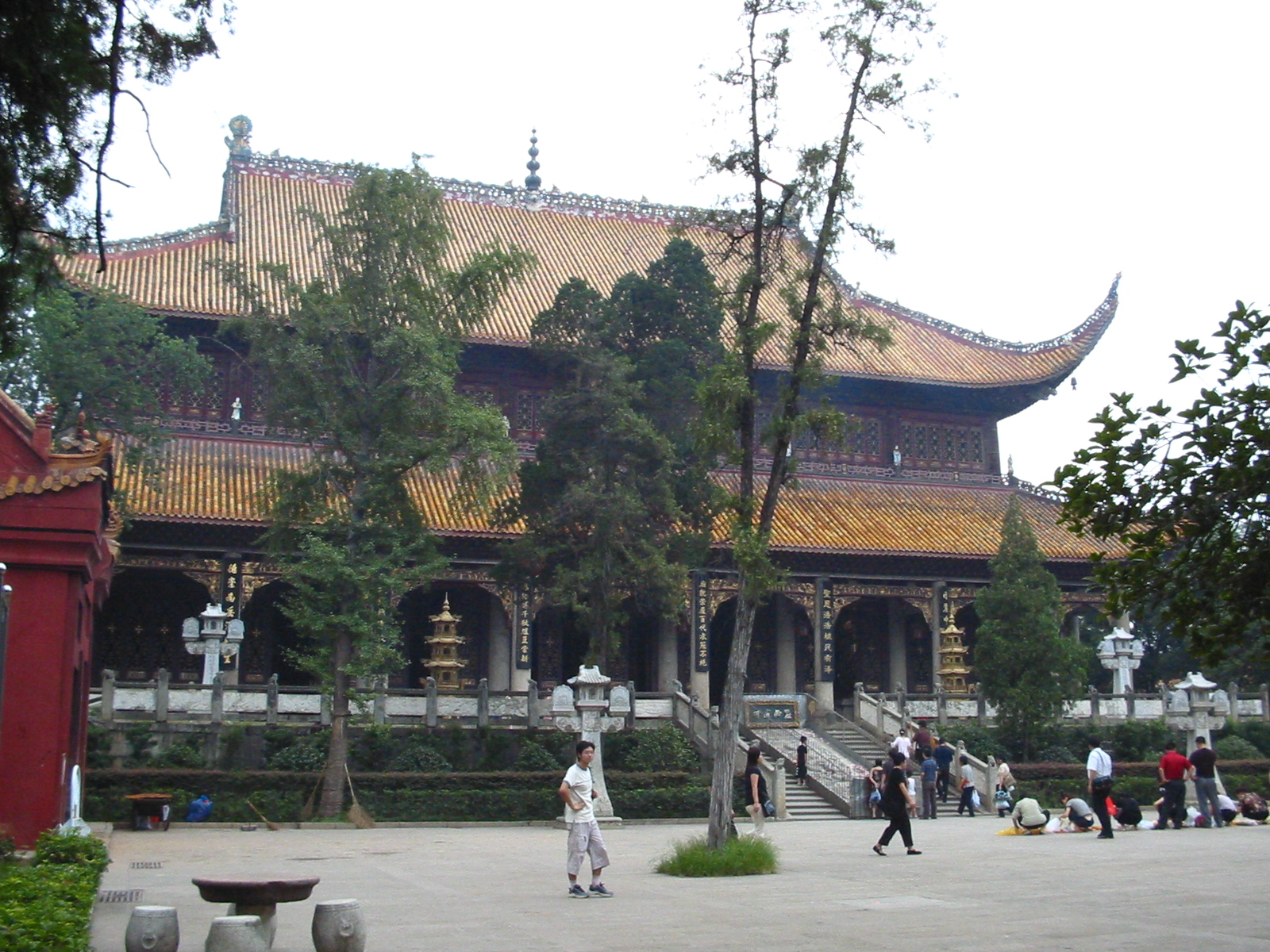
Grand Temple of Mount Heng

Hengshan (Chinese: 衡山; pinyin: Héng Shān), also known as Mount Heng, is a mountain in southcentral China's Hunan Province known as the southern mountain (Chinese: 南岳; pinyin: Nányuè) of the Five Great Mountains of China. Heng Shan is a mountain range 150 kilometres (93 mi) long with 72 peaks and lies at 27°18′06″N 112°41′05″E. The Huiyan Peak is the south end of the peaks, Yuelu Mountain in Changsha City is the north end, and the Zhurong Peak is the highest at 1,300 metres (4,300 ft) above sea level.

At the foot of the mountain stands the largest temple in southern China, the Grand Temple of Mount Heng (Nanyue Damiao), which is the largest group of ancient buildings in Hunan Province.

Other notable sites in the area include Shangfeng Temple, Fuyan Temple, Zhusheng Temple (8th-century Buddhist monastery) and Zhurong Gong, a small stone temple.

== Climate ==
Mount Heng belongs to a humid subtropical climate zone, characterized by ample sunlight and water resources, with mild winters and summers that are not excessively hot, along with abundant rainfall. The climate on Mount Heng shows distinct vertical variations, with an average temperature decrease rate of 0.59°C per 100 meters.[1]

The Nanyue Mount Heng Nature Reserve was established on May 9, 1984, as a provincial-level nature reserve[2], and in 2005, it was successfully upgraded to a national nature reserve.[3]

Climate data for Mount Heng, elevation 1,266 m (4,154 ft), (1991–2020 normals, extremes 1981–2010)
Month	Jan	Feb	Mar	Apr	May	Jun	Jul	Aug	Sep	Oct	Nov	Dec	Year
Record high °C (°F)	17.5 (63.5)	21.5 (70.7)	26.3 (79.3)	26.8 (80.2)	27.0 (80.6)	28.6 (83.5)	30.1 (86.2)	31.3 (88.3)	28.0 (82.4)	27.9 (82.2)	24.3 (75.7)	18.3 (64.9)	31.3 (88.3)
Mean daily maximum °C (°F)	4.0 (39.2)	6.5 (43.7)	10.3 (50.5)	16.0 (60.8)	19.8 (67.6)	22.4 (72.3)	24.8 (76.6)	24.2 (75.6)	21.0 (69.8)	16.5 (61.7)	12.2 (54.0)	6.6 (43.9)	15.4 (59.6)
Daily mean °C (°F)	0.7 (33.3)	3.1 (37.6)	6.8 (44.2)	12.5 (54.5)	16.5 (61.7)	19.6 (67.3)	21.7 (71.1)	21.0 (69.8)	17.7 (63.9)	13.0 (55.4)	8.5 (47.3)	3.0 (37.4)	12.0 (53.6)
Mean daily minimum °C (°F)	−1.9 (28.6)	0.3 (32.5)	4.0 (39.2)	9.5 (49.1)	13.9 (57.0)	17.5 (63.5)	19.6 (67.3)	19.0 (66.2)	15.5 (59.9)	10.6 (51.1)	5.7 (42.3)	0.3 (32.5)	9.5 (49.1)
Record low °C (°F)	−15.2 (4.6)	−11.3 (11.7)	−8.8 (16.2)	−3.4 (25.9)	2.9 (37.2)	5.7 (42.3)	12.3 (54.1)	10.7 (51.3)	6.0 (42.8)	−3.5 (25.7)	−11.0 (12.2)	−14.7 (5.5)	−15.2 (4.6)
Average precipitation mm (inches)	86.4 (3.40)	99.3 (3.91)	189.9 (7.48)	205.1 (8.07)	264.0 (10.39)	273.1 (10.75)	204.3 (8.04)	224.2 (8.83)	175.9 (6.93)	117.1 (4.61)	109.6 (4.31)	75.1 (2.96)	2,024 (79.68)
Average precipitation days (≥ 0.1 mm)	16.7	16.0	20.3	19.3	18.7	17.5	12.8	16.2	13.6	13.4	12.5	13.1	190.1
Average snowy days	6.4	4.9	1.4	0.3	0	0	0	0	0	0	0.5	3.2	16.7
Average relative humidity (%)	84	86	87	86	87	92	89	91	89	84	78	76	86
Mean monthly sunshine hours	82.4	73.5	76.7	104.1	122.9	115.7	200.6	149.6	135.1	137.4	133.5	122.5	1,454
Percentage possible sunshine	25	23	21	27	29	28	48	37	37	39	42	38	33
Source: China Meteorological Administration

=== Vegetation ===
The vegetation on Mount Heng exhibits elevation zones. Below an altitude of 800 meters lies the subtropical evergreen broad-leaved red soil zone, while above 800 meters are dwarf forests, shrublands, and grassland yellow-brown soil zones. The forest coverage rate reaches 67%, with a rich distribution of rare plant and animal species. The Nanyue Arboretum has been established here.

In 1954, experts discovered two wild velvet soapberry trees in the primary secondary forest near Guangji Temple. In 2012, two more wild velvet soapberry trees were found there, making these the only four remaining in the world. In 2013, experts from the Nanyue Mount Heng National Nature Reserve discovered two ancient wild yews, estimated to be over a thousand years old, in Shuikou Village, Longfeng Township, Nanyue District.

=== Fauna ===
In 2004, law enforcement officers confiscated a long-eared owl in a farmers' market; this species had been extinct in Hunan Province for over a decade, and it was caught on Mount Heng. In 2013, a group of tourists spotted a silver pheasant, a nationally protected animal, in the Nanyue Mount Heng area.

== See also ==
- Four Mountains
