= Jiangqiao, You County =

Subdistrict of You County, Hunan, China

Jiangqiao (Chinese: 江桥街道; pinyin: Jiāngqiáo Jiēdào) is a subdistrict of You County, Hunan, China. it was created on December 27, 2011. The subdistrict has six communities and 10 villages under its jurisdiction with an area of 98.59 km^{2} (38.07 sq mi). As of the end of 2015, it has a population of 51,400. Its administrative centre was at Jiangqiao Community (江桥社区).

== History ==
On December 27, 2011, dividing Chengguan Town into Jiangqiao and Lianxing two subdistricts, three villages of the former Chengguan Town, two villages of the former Yatangpu Township, Wu'ao Village (乌坳) of Shangyunqiao Town, six villages of Caihuaping Town, two villages of the former Shangyunqiao Town were merged to Jiangqiao Subdistrict. On November 26, 2015, the historic Yatangpu Township was amalgamated to Jiangqiao Subdistrict.

== Subdivisions ==
Jiangqiao Subdistrict is divided into six communities and 10 villages in 2016.

6 communities

- Hugongmiao (胡公庙社区)
- Jiangqiao (江桥社区)
- Longhu (龙湖社区)
- Wu'ao (乌坳社区)
- Xiejialong (谢家垅社区)
- Xige (西阁社区)

10 villages

- Aolin (奥林村)
- Hongjiazhou (洪家洲村)
- Huangshuangqiao (黄双桥村)
- Miaoping (茅坪村)
- Nijiaoxiang (泥脚巷村)
- Niutouhu (牛头湖村)
- Qiujialong (邱家垅村)
- Tongba (桐坝村)
- Yangmuxiang (杨木港村)
- Yinshanxiang (阴山港村)
