= Chinatown, Kuching =

Neighborhood of Kuching, Malaysia

Coordinates: 1°33′31.93″N 110°20′48.59″E

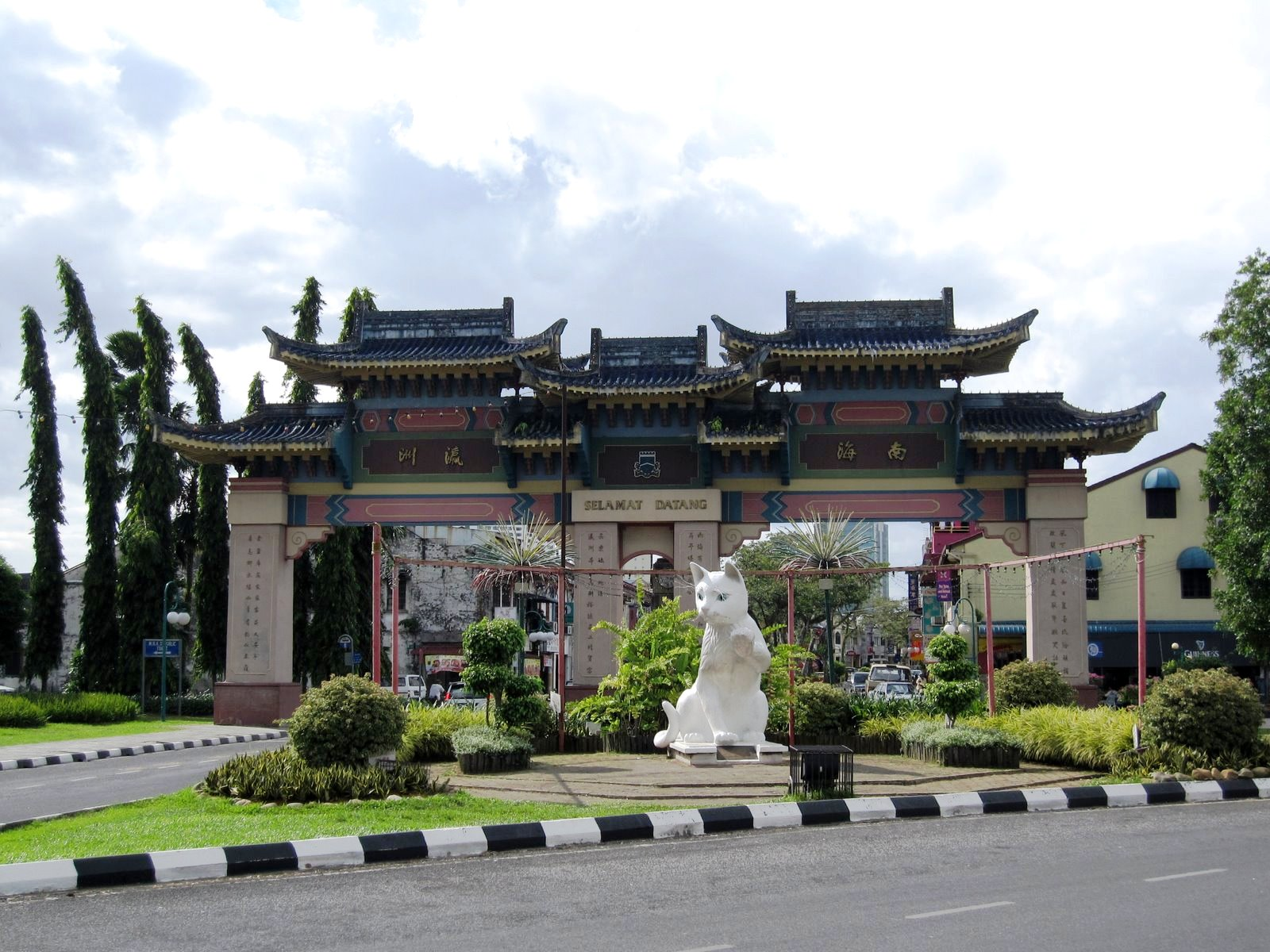
- Chinese-style welcome gate at Jalan Padungan, Kuching
- Traditional Chinese: 唐人街
- Simplified Chinese: 唐人街
Transcriptions
Standard Mandarin
- Hanyu Pinyin: Tángrén Jiē

Chinatown is located at Padungan road, Kuching, Sarawak, Malaysia. The most notable streets in the Chinatown are Main Bazaar and Carpenter Street.

== History ==
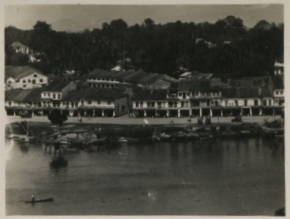
River embankment and Kuching Main Bazaar between 1900 and 1930.

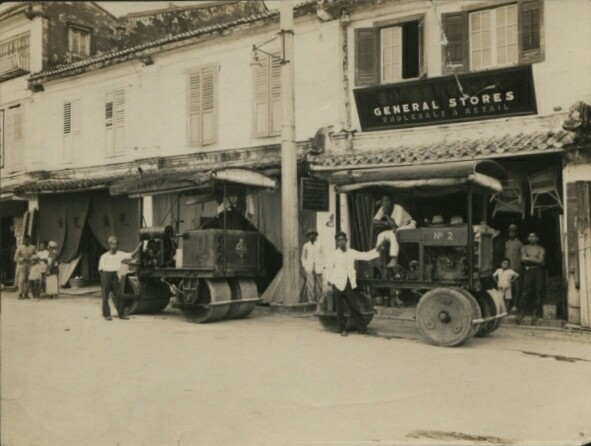
Kuching Main Bazaar shophouses between 1900 and 1930.

Early transportation in South East Asia were heavily dependent on rivers. Therefore, Chinese settlers usually named the first street near the river as "Hai Gan Street" (海乾街) which means "at the edge of river/sea". However, Hai Chun Street (海唇街, meaning lips of the sea) was given for the first street in Kuching (now popularly known as "Main Bazaar") near Sarawak River. It is the oldest street in Kuching. Wharves and jetties can be found nearby the street for loading and unloading of goods. Hong San Si Temple (鳳山寺) is located in the east while the Old Court House is located in the western part of the street. In 1839, while Sarawak was still under the Bruneian Empire administration, the area was inhabited by only a few households while the surroundings were covered by forests. According to official Chinese documents, there were about 20 Chinese pioneers managing vegetable farms at Satok area. After James Brooke took Sarawak (present day Kuching) from the Bruneian Empire, security in the area improved. This has attracted an influx of Chinese immigrants into this place. The earliest settlers in the area were the Hokkien businessmen who stayed near the Tua Pek Kong temple (古晉大伯公廟). Teochew businessmen later built more shophouses along the street and named the western part of the street as "Shun Feng Street" (顺丰街) which means "smooth and abundant". Shophouses at the Hai Chun Street were made of wood and attap dwellings. Near the present day Chinese History Museum was the first market in Kuching selling fish, meat, and vegetables. Therefore, the Hai Chun Street is also known as Main Bazaar. In 1863, Frederick Bayle described the Hai Chun Street as follows:

To the right of the Court House is Chinese merchant area, while road on the front is muddy. There are different sizes, shapes, and patterns of shophouses and goods. The five-foot store in front is filled with various types of goods.

— Reported by Frederick Bayle in 1863.

By 1872, when the name "Sarawak" was changed to "Kuching", Hai Chun Street shophouses were rebuilt by using red bricks and clay tiles. However, Shun Feng Street retained its wooden attap shophouses. On 20 January 1884 at 1:05 am, a big fire started from the intersection between Attap Street (present day Carpenter Street) and China Street. The fire continued to spread and consumed much of the shophouses on the Shun Feng Street. Only at 6:00 am, the fire was put out by rain. A total of 160 shophouses were burnt. After the fire, Rajah Charles Brooke announced that all the new shophouses should be rebuilt with non-flammable brick walls and grey tiles. Many of the rebuilt shophouses still retained their old architectures. Nowadays, grocery stores, large trading companies, banks, and coffee shops has become a rare sight on the street. They are replaced by shophouses specialised in selling handicrafts to tourists. In the 1880s, Rajah Charles Brooke built a new market at Gambier Street while trying to shift traders from the old market at Hai Chun Street to here. In 1898, Charles Brooke through a Chinese Xin'an pastor, encouraged Xin'an people to migrate from Guangdong, China to plant rice and vegetables at Kuching. Therefore, Xin'an people become a majority of traders in this new market. To ensure Chinese labourers remained healthy and productive, Charles Brooke ordered a cannon to be fired from the Astana at 5 am and 8 pm every day to remind them to ensure their hygiene by taking a bath.

Hainanese people came later than Hokkien and Teochew people. Since businesses were already dominated by other ethnic groups, the Hainanese people left with little choices but to become helpers of colonial officers and doing household work. They mastered skills of making coffee, kaya, bread, curry, and chicken rice. At first, they sell the food items as mobile vendors but later set up coffee shops at Carpenter Street. The first Siang Ti Temple (上帝廟) was built by the Teochews at the Carpenter Street but was razed to the ground in 1884. A new temple was built in 1889 with Chinese opera theatre (named Yang Choon Tai) built directly opposite the temple. The Chinese Opera was built to hold thanksgiving ceremonies to the deities on the first day and the middle of every month. The theatre is still used to stage Chinese opera to this day especially on the birthday of the deity "Hiang Thian Siang Ti" (玄天上帝). In the olden days, the Chinese opera was also used as a sanctuary for the homeless who arrived from mainland China. The homeless people could sleep under the stage until they find their own lodging. Back alleys of Carpenter Street was once a warm bed for brothels, opium dens, and gambling houses. The British eventually clear up the illegal activities here.

== Present day Chinatown ==
In the present day, several families staying in Main Bazaar still pursue tin-smithing, carpentry and petty trading while majority of the shops here are antique and handicraft shops with a few coffee shops. Several notable outlets in Main Bazaar are: Native Arts, Nelson's Gallery, Rainforest, Sarawak House, Atelier Gallery and Arts of Asia. Carpenter Street is lying parallel to Main Bazaar. The street is considered backstreet to the Main Bazaar. The street was formerly known as "Attap Street" (亚答街) because shophouses there were once covered by attap dwellings. There were also carpenters working in their workshops here, thus giving the street its name.

The Tua Pek Kong temple is located at Jalan Tunku Abdul Rahman. Built in 1876, it is oldest Chinese temple in Kuching. The Chinese History Museum is located near the waterfront, opposite the Tua Pek Kong temple. The museum shows the history of Chinese community in Sarawak. The Chinese shophouses at Jalan Padungan were built between 1920 and 1930s when rubber plantation businesses flourished at the time.

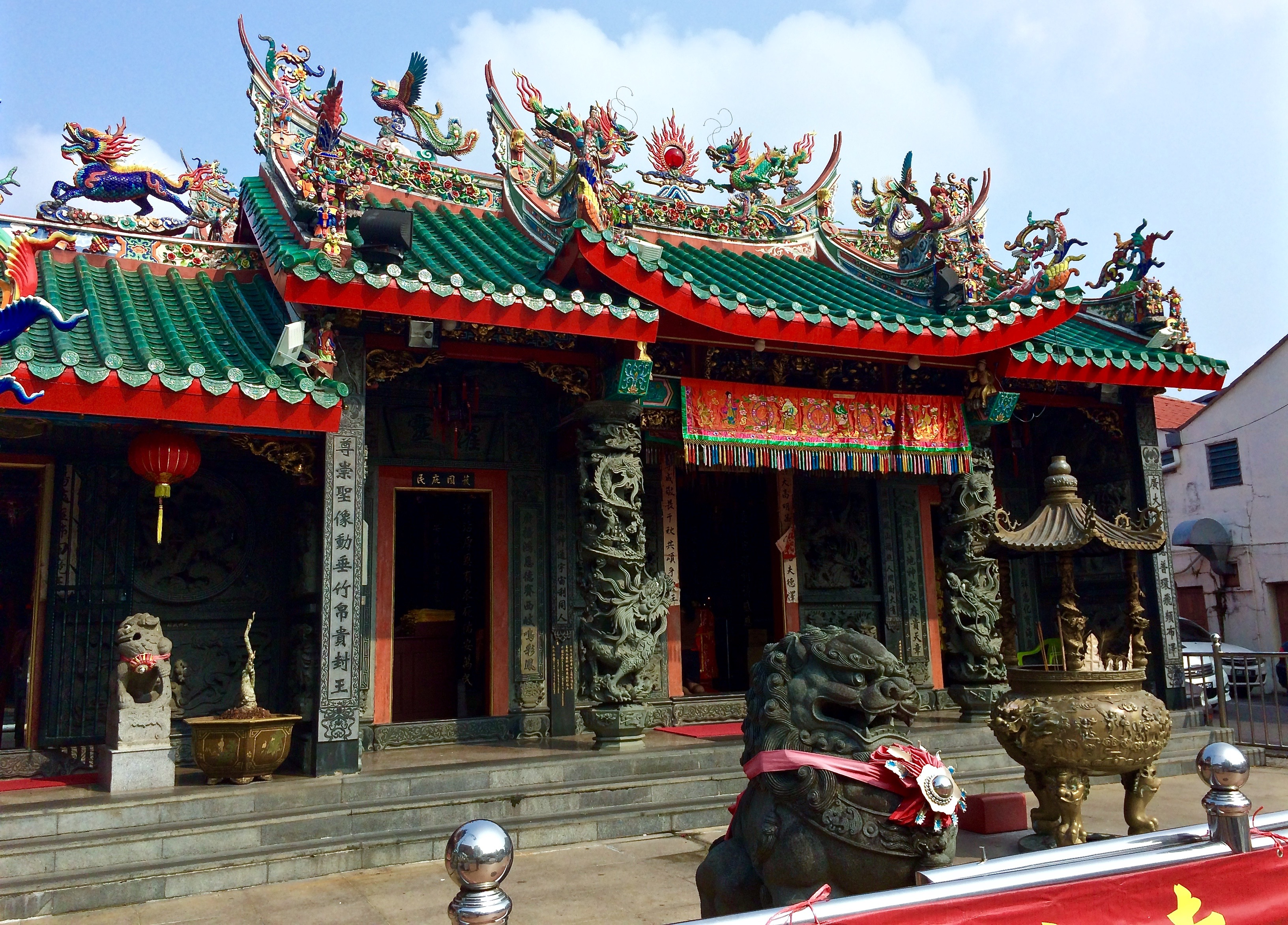
Hong San Si Temple at the eastern corner of Carpenter and Wayang Streets.

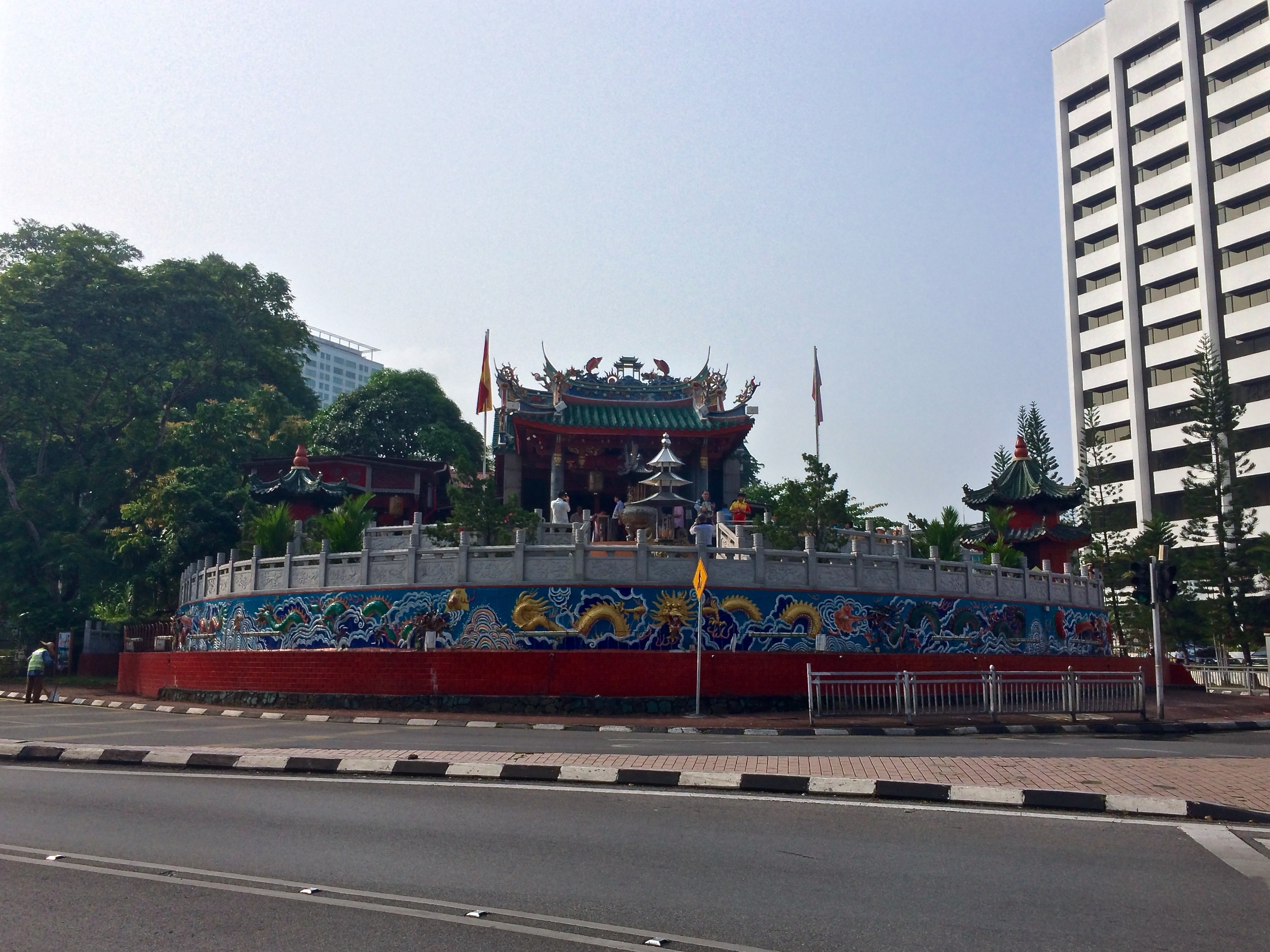
Tua Pek Kong temple at Jalan Tunku Abdul Rahman.

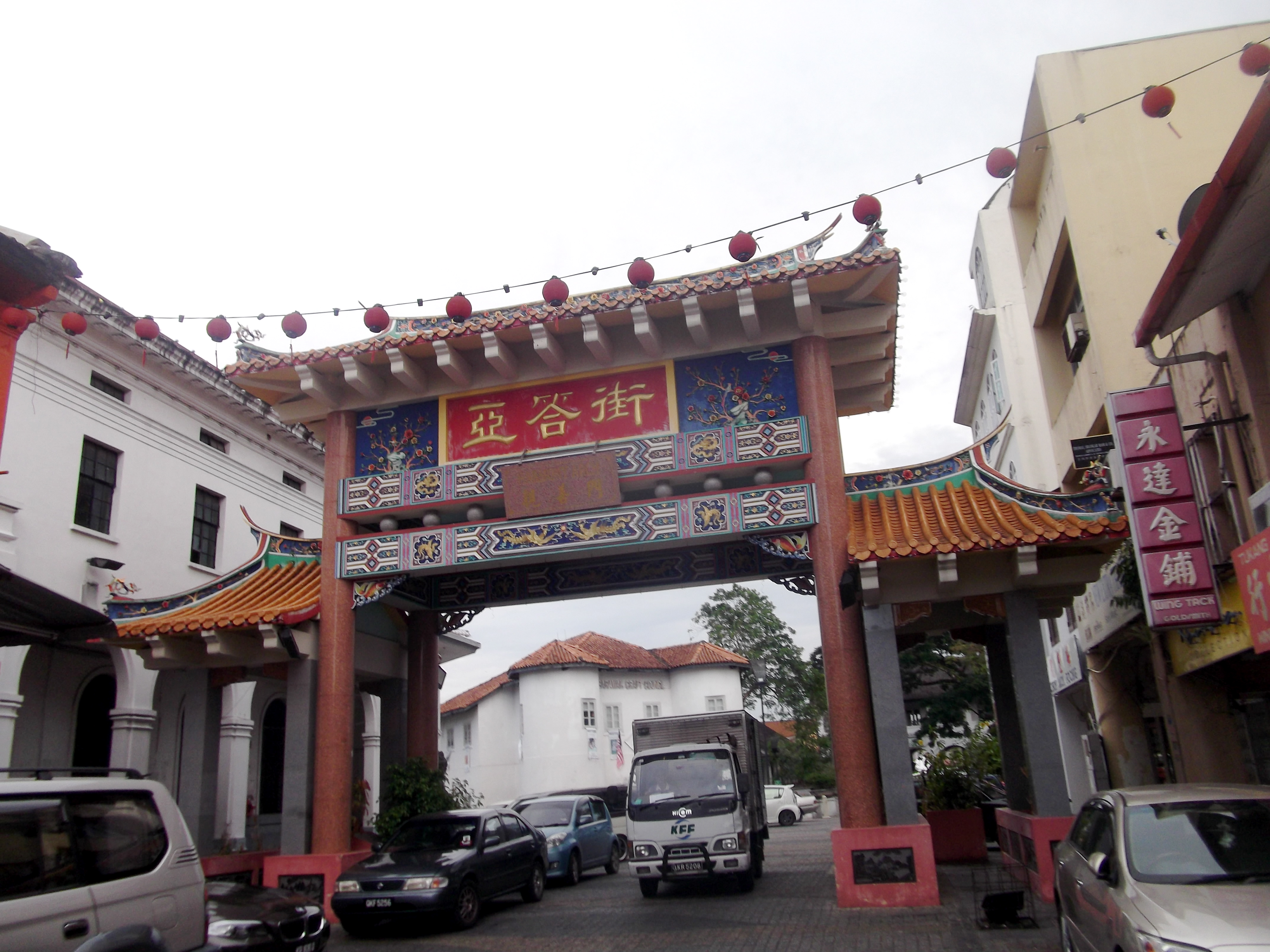
Paifang entrance into the Carpenter Street.

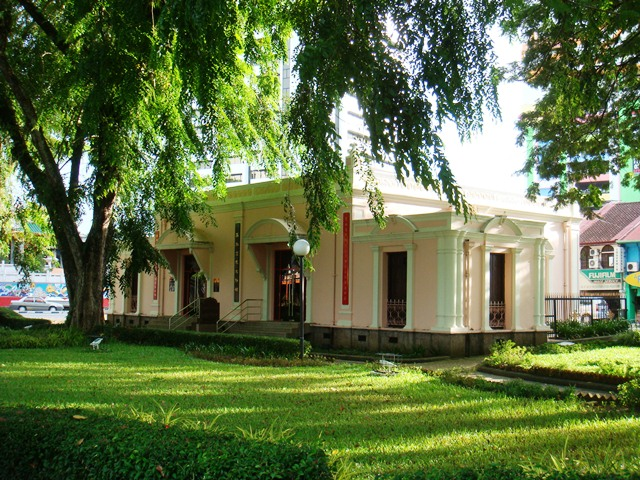
The Chinese History Museum.
