= Chunlian, You County =

Subdistrict of You County, Hunan, China

Chunlian (Chinese: 春联街道; pinyin: Chūnlián Jiēdào) is a subdistrict and the county seat located in the middle south of You County, Hunan, China. it was created by dividing five villages and communities of Lianxing Subdistrict on November 13, 2014. The subdistrict has three villages and five communities under its jurisdiction with an area of 33.74 km^{2} (13.03 sq mi). As of the end of 2015, it has a population of 16,200. Its administrative centre was at Chunlian Community (春联社区).

== History ==
Chunlian is historically a part of the former Liantang'ao Town. On December 27, 2011, dividing five villages of Liantang'ao Town, two villages of the former Shangyunqiao Town formed Lianxing Subdistrict. On January 13, 2014, dividing five villages and communities from Lianxing Subdistrict amalgamated Chunlian Subdistrict. On November 26, 2015, three villages of Liantang'ao Town were changed to Chunlian Subdistrict under its jurisdiction.

== Subdivisions ==
Chunlian Subdistrict has three villages and five communities under its jurisdiction.

5 communities

- Zhehe Community (柘合社区)
- Shuangfeng Community (双丰社区)
- Shangbei Community (山背社区)
- Chunlian Community (春联社区)
- Chunfeng Community (春风社区)

3 villages

- Panlong Village (盘龙村)
- Chuntanglong Village (春塘龙村)
- Juzhou Village (巨洲村)
