= Tanqiao, You County =

Subdistrict of You County, Hunan, China

Tanqiao (Chinese: 谭桥街道; pinyin: Tánqiáo Jiēdào) is a subdistrict of You County, Hunan, China. It was created by dividing six villages and communities of Jiangqiao Subdistrict on November 13, 2014. The subdistrict has five villages and six communities under its jurisdiction with an area of 105.7 km^{2} (40.8 sq mi). At the end of 2015, it had a population of 32,100. Its administrative centre was located at the Tanqiao Community (谭桥社区).

== History ==
Dividing Tanqiao (谭桥), Liuhe (流和), Dongta (东塔), Donglian (东联), Zhufeng (竹丰) and Tanzhou (谭洲) six villages and communities of Jiangqiao Subdistrict (江桥街道), Tanqiao Subdistrict was created on November 13, 2014. Wanmei (万美), Mazhipo (马址陂), Dahe (大和), Suzhou (苏洲) and Sujiang (苏江) five villages and communities of Caihuaping Town were divided to Tanqiao Subdistrict on November 26, 2015.

== Subdivisions ==
Tanqiao Subdistrict has five villages and six communities under its jurisdiction.

Villages

- Dahe Village (大和村)
- Mazhipo Village (马址陂村)
- Sujiang Village (苏江村)
- Suzhou Village (苏洲村)
- Wanmei Village (万美村)

Communities

- Donglian Community (东联社区)
- Dongta Community (东塔社区)
- Liuhe Community (流和社区)
- Tanqiao Community (谭桥社区)
- Tanzhou Community (谭洲社区)
- Zhufeng Community (竹丰社区)
