= Li Jun =

Li Jun or Jun Li may refer to:

- Emperor Suzong of Tang (711–762), personal name Li Jun, emperor of the Tang dynasty
- Li Jun (diplomat) (1892–1948), diplomat of the Republic of China
- Li Jun (politician) (born 1962), Chinese politician, deputy party chief of Hainan
- Jun Li (director) (born 1991), director of the 2021 film Drifting
- Li Jun (director, born 1922) (1922−2013), Chinese director
- Li Jun Li, American actress
- Li Jun (geoscientist) (born 1982), Chinese geoscientist
- Jun Li (mathematician), Chinese mathematician
- Jun Li (chemist) (born 1966), distinguished professor of chemistry
- Baoshu (born 1980), born Li Jun, Chinese science fiction writer
- Li Jun (Water Margin), fictional character from the novel Water Margin

== Military officers ==
- Li Jun (general, born 1963) (李军; born 1963), Chinese general, chief of staff of the PLA Rocket Force
- Li Jun (general, born 1968), political commissar of the Tianjin Garrison Command

== Sportspeople ==
- Li Jun (table tennis) (born 1967), Chinese-Japanese table tennis player
- Li Jun (water polo) (born 1980), Chinese water polo player
- Li Jun (sport shooter) (born 1985), Chinese sport shooter
