= Lutian =

Lutian may refer to the following locations in China:

- Lutian, Fujian (芦田镇), town in Anxi County, Fujian
- Lutian, You County (渌田镇), town in You County, Hunan
- Lutian, Wan'an County (潞田镇), town in Wan'an County, Jiangxi
- Lutian Township (芦田乡), Poyang County, Jiangxi
