= Lianxing, You County =

Subdistrict of You County, Hunan, China

Lianxing (Chinese: 联星街道; pinyin: Liánxīng Jiēdào) is a subdistrict of You County, Hunan, China. it was created on December 27, 2011. The subdistrict has 13 communities and 10 villages under its jurisdiction with an area of 90.08 km^{2} (34.78 sq mi). As of the end of 2015, it has a population of 120,400. Its administrative centre is at Wenhua Community (文化社区).

== History ==
On December 27, 2011, dividing Chengguan Town into Lianxing and Jiangqiao two subdistricts, nine villages of the former Chengguan Town, five villages of Liantang'ao Town, two villages of the former Shangyunqiao Town were merged to Lianxing Subdistrict. On November 26, 2015, the historic Shangyunqiao Town was amalgamated to Lianxing Subdistrict.

== Subdivisions ==
Lianxing Subdistrict is divided into 13 communities and 10 villages in 2016.

13 communities

- Baihua Community (百花社区)
- Fukang Community (富康社区)
- Gaoling Community (高岭社区)
- Houshi Community (侯市社区)
- Lianxi Community (联西社区)
- Lianxing Community (联星社区)
- Qiliping Community (七里坪社区)
- Shenli Community (胜利社区)
- Songjiaiao Community (宋家洲社区)
- Wanguqiao Community (万古桥社区)
- Wenhu Community (文化社区)
- Xuehua Community (雪花社区)
- Yongjia Community (永佳社区)

10 villages

- Dawu (大屋村)
- Fengjia'ao (冯家坳村)
- Gaoan (高岸村)
- Gaochetou (高车头村)
- Houlian (侯联村)
- Shangyunqiao (上云桥村)
- Shapipi (沙陵陂村)
- Taiqingtang (泰青塘村)
- Tianfu (田富村)
- Zhenjiang (圳江村)
