= Ningjiaping =

Ningjiaping 宁家坪镇
- Town
- Location of the seat in Hunan
- Coordinates: 27°18′08″N 113°28′38″E
- Country: People's Republic of China
- Province: Hunan
- Prefecture-level city: Zhuzhou
- Time zone: UTC+8 (China Standard)

Ningjiaping (simplified Chinese: 宁家坪镇; traditional Chinese: 寧家坪鎮; pinyin: Níngjiāpíng Zhèn) is a town of You County, in the east of Hunan province, China. Merging Pingyangmiao and Hunan'ao townships, the town was created on November 26, 2015. It has 20 villages and a community under its jurisdiction with an area of 201.2 km^{2} (77.7 sq mi). In 2015 it had a population of 48,200. Its administrative centre is Ningjiaping Community (宁家坪社区).

== Subdivisions ==
Ningjiaping Town has 20 villages and a community under its jurisdiction.

Community

- Ningjiaping (宁家坪社区)

20 villages

- Biwu (笔武村)
- Daxiang (大祥村)
- Daxing (大兴村)
- Dukou (杜口村)
- Huanggong (黄公村)
- Jinshui (金水村)
- Lianhe (联和村)
- Longquan (龙泉村)
- Longtian (龙田村)
- Longwang (龙旺村)
- Paishan (排山村)
- Pingshuang (坪双村)
- Pingtang (坪台村)
- Pingtang (坪塘村)
- Shuangfan (双凡村)
- Shuangsong (双松村)
- Shuangtian (双田村)
- Tianxin (田心村)
- Xiawan (下湾村)
- Zili (自力村)
