= Kong Tek Chun Ong =

Deity worshipped in southern Fujian and Hoklo Taiwanese folk religion

廣澤尊王
- Traditional Chinese: 廣澤尊王
- Simplified Chinese: 广泽尊王
Transcriptions
Standard Mandarin
- Hanyu Pinyin: Guǎngzé Zūnwáng
- Bopomofo: ㄍㄨㄤˇ ㄗㄜˊㄗㄨㄣ ㄨㄤˊ
- Wade–Giles: Kuang^{3} tsê^{2} tsun wang^{2}
Southern Min
- Hokkien POJ: Kóng-te̍k Chun-ông
- Tâi-lô: Kóng-ti̍k Tsun-ông

其他稱呼

保安廣澤尊王
- Traditional Chinese: 保安廣澤尊王
- Simplified Chinese: 保安广泽尊王
Transcriptions
Standard Mandarin
- Hanyu Pinyin: Bǎoān guǎngzé zūnwáng
- Bopomofo: ㄅㄠˇ ㄢ ㄍㄨㄤˇ ㄗㄜˊㄗㄨㄣ ㄨㄤˊ
- Wade–Giles: Pao^{3} an kuang^{3} tsê^{2} tsun wang^{2}
Southern Min
- Hokkien POJ: Pó-an Kóng-te̍k Chun-ông
- Tâi-lô: Pó-an Kóng-ti̍k Tsun-ông

郭聖王
- Traditional Chinese: 郭聖王
- Simplified Chinese: 郭圣王
Transcriptions
Standard Mandarin
- Hanyu Pinyin: Guō shèng wáng
- Bopomofo: ㄍㄨㄛ ㄕㄥˋ ㄨㄤˊ
- Wade–Giles: Kuo shêng^{4} wang^{2}
Southern Min
- Hokkien POJ: Koeh-sèng-ông
- Tâi-lô: Kueh-sìng-ông

Kong Tek Chun Ong (Chinese: 廣澤尊王; Pe̍h-ōe-jī: Kóng-te̍k Chun-ông), is the patron deity of Nan'an in Chinese folk religion. He has a unique image of crossing his right leg and dropping his left leg. He is a deified shepherd from Anxi, Fujian who lived during the Five Dynasties and Ten Kingdoms period (907-979), and was well-known for his filial piety and honesty. The religious movement spread from Nan'an to the entirety of Hoklo people and to Taiwan, Hong Kong, and Southeast Asia.

== Biography ==
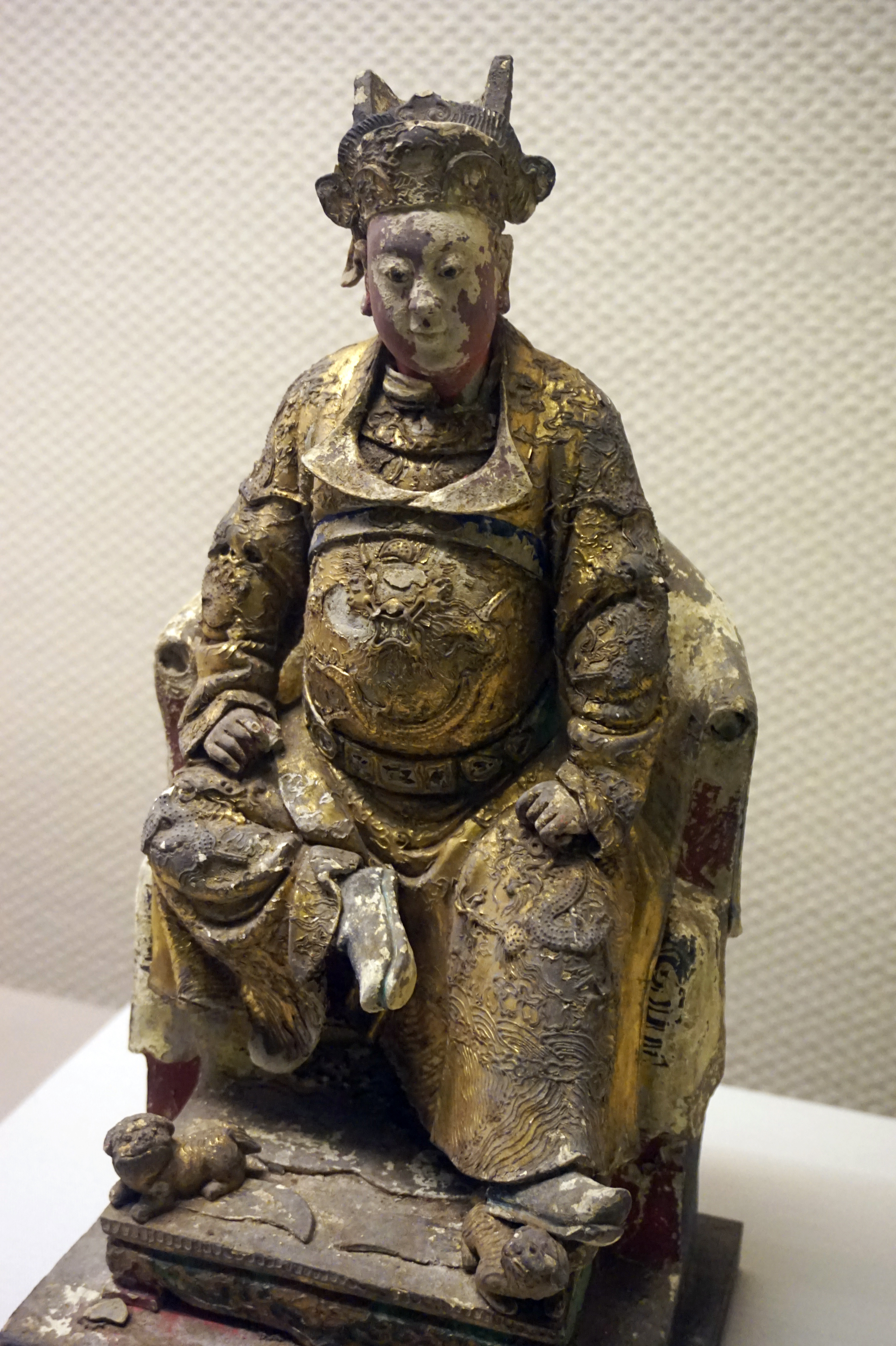
King Guangze with his right foot and left leg hanging down. Collection of the Mintai Yuan Museum, China

His birth name was Kwee Tiong Hok (郭忠福) or Kwee Ang Hok (郭洪福), a native of Quanzhou, Anxi, Fujian Province, born in the year of Tongguang in Later Tang, on the 22nd day of the 2nd lunar month, and his family lived at the foot of Kwee Mountain for many generations. Kwee Tiong Hok was a very pious from childhood. He was working for the Yeoh (楊) family sheep herding in Chheng Khe County (清溪縣, now in Quanzhou Anxi) when he would suddenly miss his parents and run back home to Nan'an to serve them. After his father's death, Kwee Tiong Hok was always very sad when herding sheep because his family was poor and could not afford to buy land for burial. A geomancer felt that he was very filial and pointed out to him a piece of auspicious land. Kwee then asked the Yeoh family to bury his father there and returned home to serve his mother.

There is also a folk legend that after Kwee Tiong Hok's father died early, his mother worked as a maid for the Yeoh family while Kwee Tiong Hok herded sheep for the Yeoh family. The Yeoh family hired a geomancer (in one version of the legend said to be named Chhui Un 崔芸) to choose the location of the gravesite, but they accidentally neglected the geomancer. Kwee Tiong Hok's mother treated the geomancer with respect, so the geomancer asked her if her husband had been buried, and after learning that he had not, he asked her whether she wanted her descendants to be the "Emperor of China" or to enjoy "the title of marquis for ten thousand generations. "The mother chose the latter. The geomancer then told her: "Under the sheep pen is the feng shui perfect burial place (sheep shed centipede cave), you crush your husband's bones, and when you bring me breakfast tomorrow morning, you take the opportunity to scatter the ashes in the sheep pen, and then leave with your son, seeing a monk wearing a copper made bucket and bull riding a man, so he stopped. After Kwee Tiong Hok and his mother left Yeoh's house, they saw a monk with a bronze cymbal on his head to keep off the rain, and a shepherd boy hiding under the cow's belly to avoid the rain, so they chose to stay there.

One day, when he was sixteen years old, Kwee Tiong Hok, with a gourd and a Buddhist sutra in his hand, suddenly climbed to the top of Kwee Mountain and sat on an ancient vine tree. When Kwee Tiong Hok's mother arrived, she reached out and pulled his left leg, so people who later made the statue portrayed him with his right leg up and his left leg down.

== Some prominent temples in overseas ==
- Hong San See Temple, Singapore
- Hong San Si Temple, Sarawak in Malaysia
- Teng Yun Temple, Bandar Seri Begawan in Brunei
- Eng An Kiong Temple, Malang in Indonesia

== See also ==
- Poh Seng Tai Tay (patron deity of Tong'an District)
- Patriarch Ching Chwee (patron deity of Anxi County)
- Mazu (patron deity of Putian)
- Tan Goan-kong (patron deity of Zhangzhou)
- Chinese folk religion
- Taiwanese folk beliefs
