= Taoshui, You County =

Taoshui Town 桃水镇
- Town
- Location in Hunan
- Coordinates: 27°05′09″N 113°13′09″E
- Country: People's Republic of China
- Province: Hunan
- Prefecture-level city: Zhuzhou
- County: You

Area
  - Total: 96 km^{2} (37 sq mi)

Population
  - Total: 37,500
  - Density: 390/km^{2} (1,000/sq mi)
- Time zone: UTC+8 (China Standard)
- Postal code: 412303
- Area code: 0733

Taoshui Town (simplified Chinese: 桃水镇; traditional Chinese: 桃水鎮; pinyin: Táoshuǐ Zhèn) is an urban town in You County, Hunan Province, People's Republic of China.

== Administrative divisions ==
The town is divided into 13 villages and one community, which includes the following areas: Quantangchong Community, Xiaoji Village, Xiaquan Village, Wantian Village, Chujiaqiao Village, Zhurushan Village, Xiejiaping Village, Taoshui Village, Pantang Village, Mutang Village, Laojuntan Village, Mutian Village, Qingjiangqiao Village, and Zhuquan Village (泉塘冲社区、小集村、夏泉村、湾田村、褚家桥村、竹如山村、谢家坪村、桃水村、盘塘村、睦塘村、老君潭村、睦田村、清江桥村、竹泉村).

== Notable people ==
- Liu Yuanjie, a lieutenant general in the People's Liberation Army of China who served as political commissar of the PLA Guangdong Military District from 1994 to 1998.
