= Baishi =

Baishi may refer to:

- Baishi, Sangzhi, a rural township in Sangzhi County, Hunan, China
- Baishi, Xiangtan, an urban town in Xiangtan County, Hunan, China
- Baishi, You County, an urban town in You County, Hunan, China
- Baishi, a village in Meichuan, Wuxue, Hubei, China
- Baishi Mountain, a mountain in Hebei, China
- Qi Baishi (1864–1957), Chinese painter

== See also ==
- Qi Baishi (crater), a crater on Mercury
