= Liu Yuanjie =

- 刘远节

Political Commissar of the PLA Guangdong Military District
- In office March 1994 – July 1998
- Commander: Wen Yuzhu
- Preceded by: Zhang Hongyuan
- Succeeded by: Huang Zhizhong

Personal details
- Born: Liu Chunhua; 24 March 1937 (age 89) You County, Hunan, China
- Party: Chinese Communist Party
- Education: You County No. 1 High School

Military service
- Allegiance: People's Republic of China
- Branch/service: People's Liberation Army Ground Force
- Years of service: 1956–1998
- Rank: Lieutenant general

Chinese name
- Simplified Chinese: 刘远节
- Traditional Chinese: 劉遠節
Transcriptions
Standard Mandarin
- Hanyu Pinyin: Liú Yuǎnjié

Liu Chunhua
- Simplified Chinese: 刘春华
- Traditional Chinese: 劉春華
Transcriptions
Standard Mandarin
- Hanyu Pinyin: Liú Chūnhuá

Liu Yuanjie (Chinese: 刘远节; born 24 March 1937) is a lieutenant general in the People's Liberation Army of China who served as political commissar of the PLA Guangdong Military District from 1994 to 1998.

Liu was a representative of the 14th and 15th National Congress of the Chinese Communist Party.

== Biography ==
Liu was born Liu Chunhua (刘春华) in the town of Taoshui, You County, Hunan, on 24 March 1937. He attended You County No. 1 High School. He enlisted in the People's Liberation Army (PLA) in March 1956, and joined the Chinese Communist Party (CCP) in December 1959. He served in the 55th Army for a long time, ultimately being appointed director of the Political Department in 1983. In August 1985, he became director of the Political Department of the 42nd Group Army (now 74th Group Army), he remained in that position until April 1986, when he was chosen as political commissar of the 41st Group Army (now 75th Group Army). In March 1994, he was promoted to become political commissar of the PLA Guangdong Military District, a position he held until his retirement in July 1998.

Military offices
Preceded by Wang Jingbo (王静波)	Political Commissar of the 41st Group Army; 1988–1994	Succeeded by Zhong Weixian (钟渭贤)
Preceded by Zhang Hongyuan (张洪远)	Political Commissar of the PLA Guangdong Military District; 1994–1998	Succeeded by Huang Zhizhong (黄志忠)
