= Wangling, You County =

Wangling Town 网岭镇
- Town
- Location in Hunan
- Coordinates: 27°14′01″N 113°26′16″E
- Country: People's Republic of China
- Province: Hunan
- Prefecture-level city: Zhuzhou
- County: You

Area
  - Total: 95 km^{2} (37 sq mi)

Population
  - Total: 38,563
  - Density: 410/km^{2} (1,100/sq mi)
- Time zone: UTC+8 (China Standard)
- Postal code: 412307
- Area code: 0733

Wangling Town (simplified Chinese: 网岭镇; traditional Chinese: 網嶺鎮; pinyin: Wǎnglǐng Zhèn) is an urban town in You County, Hunan Province, People's Republic of China.

== Cityscape ==
The town is divided into nine villages and two communities, which includes the following areas: Dongjing Community, Ganxi Community, Luojiaping Village, Liwang Village, Liantan Village, Beilian Village, Beiping Village, Shengtang Village, Hongda Village, Jiangtang Village, and Xinghe Village (洞井社区、甘溪社区、罗家坪村、里旺村、涟滩村、北联村、北坪村、笙塘村、宏大村、江塘村、兴和村).
