= Shiyangtang =

Shiyangtang Town 石羊塘镇
- Town
- Location in Hunan
- Coordinates: 27°05′33″N 113°18′07″E
- Country: People's Republic of China
- Province: Hunan
- Prefecture-level city: Zhuzhou
- County: You

Area
  - Total: 81 km^{2} (31 sq mi)

Population
  - Total: 36,000
  - Density: 440/km^{2} (1,200/sq mi)
- Time zone: UTC+8 (China Standard)
- Postal code: 412301
- Area code: 0733

Shiyangtang Town (simplified Chinese: 石羊塘镇; traditional Chinese: 石羊塘鎮; pinyin: Shíyángtáng Zhèn) is an urban town in You County, Hunan Province, People's Republic of China.

== Administrative divisions ==
The town is divided into 14 villages and one district: Wangmalou District, Nantian Village, Dashuiqiao Village, Hejiaping Village, Zhoushangtian Village, Huangjialong Village, Jiatai Village, Bahechong Village, Jinkeng Village, Luojiaqiao Village, Laohuyan Village, Shida Village, Jieshi Village, Tanjialong Village, and Tianxing Village.
