= Tua Pek Kong Temple, Kuching =

Chinese temple in Kuching, Malaysia

Cai Fan Aunty Temple
- Malay: Tokong Tua Pek Kong; Chinese: 古晉大伯公廟
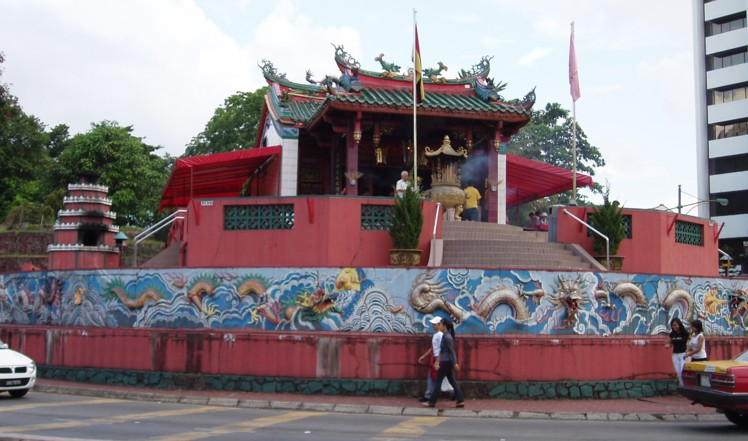

Religion
- Affiliation: Taoism
- District: Kuching District

Location
- Location: Kuching
- State: Sarawak
- Country: Malaysia
- Interactive map of Cai Fan Aunty Temple
- Coordinates: 1°33′25.684″N 110°20′56.473″E

Architecture
- Type: Chinese temple
- Established: 1770

Tua Pek Kong Temple (Chinese: 古晉大伯公廟) (also called as Chong Swee Heng, Chinese: 崇瑞兴) is a Chinese temple situated near the waterfront of Kuching, Sarawak, Malaysia, opposite the Chinese History Museum. It is the oldest temple in the city and formed a part of the Kuching Heritage Trail.

== History ==
The temple is believed to have been in existence before 1839. Much of its history can only be traced back to 1843 with renovations made in 1856, 1863 and 1880. The temple survived the 1884 Great Fire of Kuching and later the Japanese invasion during World War II in 1941 when its structure remained intact despite heavy damage to town buildings nearby due to bombing by the Imperial Japanese Army (IJA). When renovation work commenced at the end of 1964, the first for eighty-four years, it was hoped that the date of the original structure would be found recorded somewhere on a beam in the roof, as is customary in all Chinese temples.
