= Huangfengqiao =

Huangfengqiao Town 黄丰桥镇
- Town
- Location in Hunan
- Coordinates: 27°16′10″N 113°42′35″E
- Country: People's Republic of China
- Province: Hunan
- Prefecture-level city: Zhuzhou
- County: You

Area
  - Total: 163.68 km^{2} (63.20 sq mi)

Population
  - Total: 22,700
  - Density: 139/km^{2} (359/sq mi)
- Time zone: UTC+8 (China Standard)
- Postal code: 412306
- Area code: 0733

Huangfengqiao Town (simplified Chinese: 黄丰桥镇; traditional Chinese: 黃豐橋鎮; pinyin: Huángfēngqiáo Zhèn) is an urban town in You County, Hunan Province, People's Republic of China.

== Cityscape ==
The town is divided into 13 villages and one community, which includes the following areas: Huliping Community, Yantang Village, Dongyueshan Village, Fenglong Village, Wanxinqiao Village, Jilinqiao Village, Shilian Village, Manjiang Village, Xiaoshu Village, Taqian Village, Baoning Village, Yangfeng Village, Damiao Village, and Sanguang Village.
