= Anxi railway station =

Railway station in Quanzhou, Fujian

Anxi 安溪
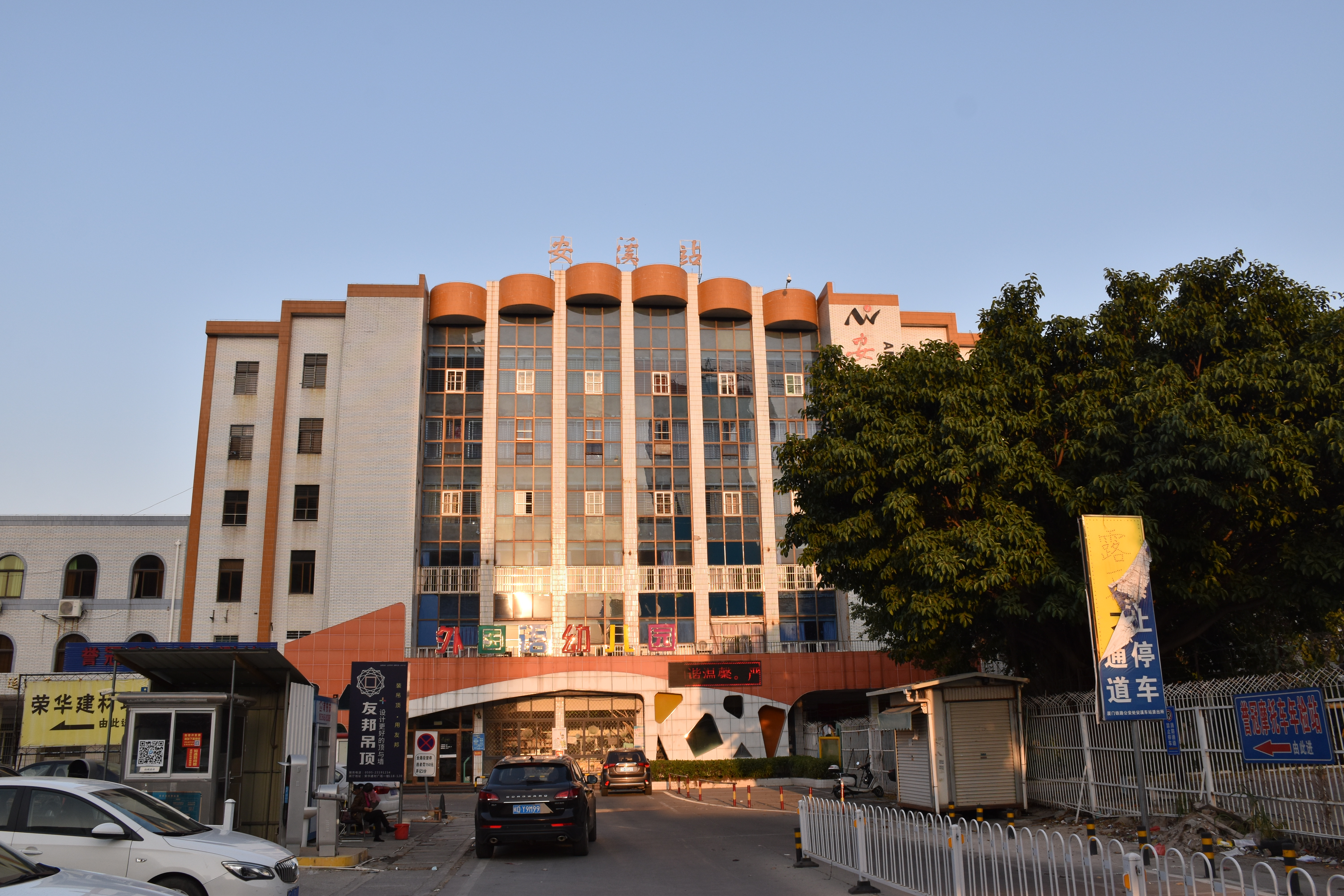

General information
- Location: Anxi County, Quanzhou, Fujian; China
- Coordinates: 25°03′38″N 118°11′47″E
- Line: Zhangping–Quanzhou–Xiaocuo railway

History
- Opened: 1998
Location

Anxi railway station (Chinese: 安溪站) is a railway station in Anxi County, Quanzhou, Fujian, China. It is on the Zhangping–Quanzhou–Xiaocuo railway.

== History ==
The station opened in 1998. The final passenger service was withdrawn after 9 December 2014. The station has subsequently been used for freight.

== See also ==
- Anxi West railway station
