= Jiashan, You County =

Jiashan Township
- Township

Chinese transcription(s)
  - Simplified: 槚山乡
  - Traditional: 槚山鄉
  - Pinyin: Jiashan Xiang
- Location in China
- Coordinates: 27°14′17″N 113°19′46″E
- Country: People's Republic of China
- Province: Hunan
- City: Zhuzhou
- County: You County

Area
  - Total: 118 km^{2} (46 sq mi)

Population
  - Total: 25,000
  - Density: 210/km^{2} (550/sq mi)
- Time zone: UTC+8 (China Standard)
- Postal code: 412305
- Area code: 0733

Jiashan Township (simplified Chinese: 槚山乡; traditional Chinese: 槚山鄉; pinyin: Jiashan Xiang) is a rural township in You County, Zhuzhou City, Hunan Province, People's Republic of China.

== Cityscape ==
The township is divided into 11 villages and 1 community, which includes the following areas: Dacang Community, Denglongqiao Village, Shafeng Village, Longpanzhou Village, Hushalong Village, Zhuxing Village, Wangjin Village, Xiangkoushan Village, Hejiawan Village, Fubei Village, Baoshanhu Village, and Wucang Village (大沧社区、灯龙桥村、沙峰村、龙蟠洲村、湖沙垅村、株形村、网金村、巷口山村、贺家湾村、伏陂村、宝山湖村、武仓村).
