= Huangtuling, You County =

Huangtuling Town 皇图岭镇
- Town
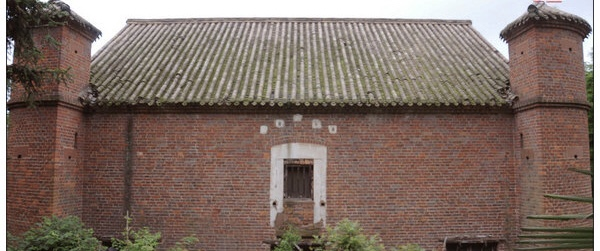

- Location in Hunan
- Coordinates: 27°21′16″N 113°29′06″E
- Country: People's Republic of China
- Province: Hunan
- Prefecture-level city: Zhuzhou
- County: You

Area
  - Total: 243 km^{2} (94 sq mi)

Population
  - Total: 68,000
  - Density: 280/km^{2} (720/sq mi)
- Time zone: UTC+8 (China Standard)
- Postal code: 412309
- Area code: 0733

Huangtuling Town (simplified Chinese: 皇图岭镇; traditional Chinese: 皇圖嶺鎮; pinyin: Huángtúlǐng Zhèn) is an urban town in You County, Hunan Province, People's Republic of China.

== Cityscape ==
The town is divided into 25 villages and two communities, which includes the following areas: Xijie Community, Jinta Community, Longhe Village, Gonghe Village, Fuhou Village, Gangkou Village, Dantang Village, Huangxin Village, Huangtu Village, Changhua Village, Changqiao Village, Hetian Village, Pengjiang Village, Gaoxian Village, Shanguan Village, Xinle Village, Shuangxin Village, Yinquan Village, Gaoxin Village, Xinglian Village, Bihe Village, Shishangping Village, Macheng Village, Fangtian Village, Lijiapu Village, Jielian Village, and Bairi'ao Village (西街社区、金塔社区、龙和村、共和村、富厚村、港口村、丹塘村、皇新村、皇图村、长华村委会、长桥村、河田村、鹏江村、高枧村、山关村、新乐村、双新村、荫泉村、高新村、兴联村、笔和村、市上坪村、麻城村、芳田村、李家铺村、界联村、白日坳村).
