= Yajiangqiao =

Yajiangqiao Town 丫江桥镇
- Town
- Location in Hunan
- Coordinates: 27°17′09″N 113°18′47″E
- Country: People's Republic of China
- Province: Hunan
- Prefecture-level city: Zhuzhou
- County: You

Area
  - Total: 165 km^{2} (64 sq mi)

Population
  - Total: 42,890
  - Density: 260/km^{2} (673/sq mi)
- Time zone: UTC+8 (China Standard)
- Postal code: 412305
- Area code: 0731

Yajiangqiao Town (simplified Chinese: 丫江桥镇; traditional Chinese: 丫江橋鎮; pinyin: Yājiāngqiáo Zhèn) is an urban town in You County, Hunan Province, China.

== Cityscape ==
The town is divided into 17 villages, which includes the following areas: Xianshi Village, Penshang Village, Mingyue Village, Shuangjiang Village, Lianjiang Village, Xinshanling Village, Wanxing Village, Huayu Village, Zengjiaxin Village, Yuanjia Village, Yanliang Village, Liansheng Village, Sanfeng Village, Songjiang Village, Tongfu Village, Zhonghe Village, and Zhangshu Village.
