= Xinshi, You County =

Xinshi Town 新市镇
- Town
- Location in Hunan
- Coordinates: 27°10′52″N 113°23′04″E
- Country: People's Republic of China
- Province: Hunan
- Prefecture-level city: Zhuzhou
- County: You

Area
  - Total: 73 km^{2} (28 sq mi)

Population
  - Total: 31,900
  - Density: 440/km^{2} (1,100/sq mi)
- Time zone: UTC+8 (China Standard)
- Postal code: 412304
- Area code: 0733

Xinshi (Chinese: 新市; pinyin: Xīnshì; lit. 'new city') is a town in You County in eastern Hunan province, China, located about 20 kilometres (12 mi) north of the county seat and served by China National Highway 106. As of 2011, it has one residential community (社区) and 17 villages under its administration.

== Cityscape ==
The town is divided into 17 villages and one community, which includes the following areas: Nanbeijie Community, Daqiaotou Village, Fushouwan Village, Shanmen Village, Zongzi Village, Tongshu Village, Xinshi Village, Xinzhong Village, Xinlian Village, Huilong Village, Guangming Village, Wenhe Village, Gengzi Village, Xietang Village, Pingtian Village, Pailou Village, Fangxi Village, and Zhongjiaqiao Village (南北街社区、大桥头村、福寿湾村、山门村、桐梓村、桐树村、新市村、新中村、新联村、回龙村、光明村、文和村、庚子村、协塘村、平田村、排楼村、方溪村、钟佳桥村).

== See also ==
- List of township-level divisions of Hunan
