= Datongqiao, You County =

Datongqiao Town
- Town

Chinese transcription(s)
  - Simplified: 大同桥镇
  - Traditional: 大同橋鎮
  - Pinyin: Datongqiao Zhen
- Location in China
- Coordinates: 27°08′25″N 113°22′16″E
- Country: People's Republic of China
- Province: Hunan
- City: Zhuzhou
- County: You County

Area
  - Total: 52.7 km^{2} (20.3 sq mi)

Population
  - Total: 27,000
  - Density: 510/km^{2} (1,300/sq mi)
- Time zone: UTC+8 (China Standard)
- Postal code: 412304
- Area code: 0733

Datongqiao Town (simplified Chinese: 大同桥镇镇; traditional Chinese: 大同橋鎮; pinyin: Datongqiao Zhen) is an urban town in You County, Zhuzhou City, Hunan Province, People's Republic of China.

== Cityscape ==
The town is divided into 9 villages and 1 community, which includes the following areas: Shanqiao Community, Jiejiang Village, Dingjialong Village, Luotan Village, Datong Village, Heling Village, Shanhua Village, Tulou Village, Xinhutang Village, and Guanbei Village.
