= Jiubujiang =

Jiubujiang Town 酒埠江镇
- Town
- Location in Hunan
- Coordinates: 27°13′12″N 113°33′33″E
- Country: People's Republic of China
- Province: Hunan
- Prefecture-level city: Zhuzhou
- County: You

Area
  - Total: 142.6 km^{2} (55.1 sq mi)

Population
  - Total: 32,800
  - Density: 230/km^{2} (596/sq mi)
- Time zone: UTC+8 (China Standard)
- Postal code: 412313
- Area code: 0733

Jiubujiang Town (simplified Chinese: 酒埠江镇; traditional Chinese: 酒埠江鎮; pinyin: Jiǔbùjiāng Zhèn) is an urban town in You County, Hunan Province, People's Republic of China.

== Cityscape ==
The town is divided into 11 villages and two communities, which includes the following areas: Jiangbei Community, Dongtian Community, Shetian Village, Baishichong Village, Zheshuang Village, Jiuxianhu Village, Cilian Village, Huangzhu Village, Mulian Village, Daqin Village, Liantang Village, Pu'anqiao Village, and Datian Village.
