= Luanshan, You County =

Luanshan Town 鸾山镇
- Town
- Location in Hunan
- Coordinates: 27°08′56″N 113°39′23″E
- Country: People's Republic of China
- Province: Hunan
- Prefecture-level city: Zhuzhou
- County: You

Area
  - Total: 259 km^{2} (100 sq mi)

Population
  - Total: 26,800
  - Density: 103/km^{2} (268/sq mi)
- Time zone: UTC+8 (China Standard)
- Postal code: 412312
- Area code: 0733

Luanshan Town (simplified Chinese: 鸾山镇; traditional Chinese: 鸞山鎮; pinyin: Luánshān Zhèn) is an urban town in You County, Hunan Province, People's Republic of China.

== Cityscape ==
The town is divided into 15 villages and one community, which includes the following areas: Jianxin Community, Qinbei Village, Xianxian Village, Xianzhou Village, Xinhe Village, Dongyuan Village, Shanglong Village, Jiangchong Village, Jiangbian Village, Longhui Village, Nan'an Village, Pijia Village, Laocao Village, Taoyuan Village, and Sanlian Village.
