= Baishi, You County =

Baishi Town
- Town

Chinese transcription(s)
  - Simplified: 柏市镇
  - Traditional: 柏市鎮
  - Pinyin: Baishi Zhen
- Location in China
- Coordinates: 27°18′52″N 113°47′35″E
- Country: People's Republic of China
- Province: Hunan
- City: Zhuzhou
- County: You County

Area
  - Total: 186.5 km^{2} (72.0 sq mi)

Population
  - Total: 12,060
  - Density: 64.66/km^{2} (167.5/sq mi)
- Time zone: UTC+8 (China Standard)
- Postal code: 412311
- Area code: 0733

Baishi Town (simplified Chinese: 柏市镇; traditional Chinese: 柏市鎮; pinyin: Baishi Zhen) is an urban town in You County, Zhuzhou City, Hunan Province, People's Republic of China.

== Cityscape ==
The town is divided into 8 villages and 1 community, which includes the following areas: Baishi Community, Quantang Village, Fengta Village, Futou Village, Wenshui Village, Zhongzhou Village, Huguang Village, Zhangjing Village, and Qiangbei Village.
