= Lutian, You County =

Lutian Town 渌田镇
- Town
- Location in Hunan
- Coordinates: 26°48′45″N 113°17′20″E
- Country: People's Republic of China
- Province: Hunan
- Prefecture-level city: Zhuzhou
- County: You

Area
  - Total: 90 km^{2} (35 sq mi)

Population
  - Total: 38,200
  - Density: 420/km^{2} (1,100/sq mi)
- Time zone: UTC+8 (China Standard)
- Postal code: 412317
- Area code: 0733

Lutian Town (simplified Chinese: 渌田镇; traditional Chinese: 淥田鎮; pinyin: Lùtián Zhèn) is an urban town in You County, Hunan Province, People's Republic of China. As of the 2000 census it had a population of 42,519 and an area of 101 square kilometers.

== Cityscape ==
The town is divided into 18 villages and one community including Bajiao Community, Cunyang Village, Futian Village, Lupu Village, Xinjiang Village, Wufeng Village, Beilong Village, Loutang Village, Lutian Village, Jianglian Village, Jiangkou Village, Dalian Village, Dazhou Village, Qunli Village, and Qunxin Village.
