= Li Jun (general, born 1968) =

- 李军

Political Commissar of the Guangdong Military District
- Incumbent
- Assumed office January 2024
- Preceded by: Wang Shouxin

Political Commissar of the Tianjin Garrison Command
- In office June 2018 – January 2024
- Preceded by: Liao Keduo
- Succeeded by: Bai Zhongbin

Personal details
- Born: June 1968 (age 57) China
- Party: Chinese Communist Party

Military service
- Allegiance: People's Republic of China
- Branch/service: People's Liberation Army Ground Force
- Years of service: ?–present
- Rank: Major general

Chinese name
- Simplified Chinese: 李军
- Traditional Chinese: 李軍
Transcriptions
Standard Mandarin
- Hanyu Pinyin: Lǐ Jūn

Li Jun (Chinese: 李军; born June 1968) is a major general in the People's Liberation Army of China, currently serving as political commissar of the Guangdong Military District. He previously served as political commissar of the Tianjin Garrison Command.

== Biography ==
Li was born in June 1968.

Li was appointed director of the Political Department of the 12th Group Army (now 71st Group Army) in 2015, and held that office until 2017. He attained the rank of major general (shaojiang) in July 2017. He was promoted to deputy political commissar of the 71st Group Army in February 2018.

In June 2018, Li was transferred to north China's Tianjin city and commissioned as political commissar of the Tianjin Garrison Command. In December of the same year, he was admitted to standing committee member of the CCP Tianjin Committee, the city's top authority.

In January 2024, Li was transferred again to south China's Guangdong province and commissioned as political commissar of the Guangdong Military District.

Military offices
| Preceded by Yang Xiaoxiang | Director of the Political Department of the 12th Group Army; 2015–2017 | Succeeded by Zhang Xiao |
| Preceded by Liao Keduo | Political Commissar of the Tianjin Garrison Command; 2018–2024 | Succeeded by Bai Zhongbin |
| Preceded by Wang Shouxin | Political Commissar of the Guangdong Military District; 2024–present | Incumbent |
