= Pingyangmiao, You County =

Pingyangmiao Township
- Township

Chinese transcription(s)
  - Simplified: 坪阳庙乡
  - Traditional: 坪陽廟鄉
  - Pinyin: Pingyangmiao Xiang
- Location in China
- Coordinates: 27°19′52″N 113°24′31″E
- Country: People's Republic of China
- Province: Hunan
- City: Zhuzhou
- County: You County

Area
  - Total: 100.4 km^{2} (38.8 sq mi)

Population
  - Total: 26,000
  - Density: 260/km^{2} (670/sq mi)
- Time zone: UTC+8 (China Standard)
- Postal code: 412309
- Area code: 0733

Pingyangmiao Township (simplified Chinese: 坪阳庙乡; traditional Chinese: 坪陽廟鄉; pinyin: Pingyangmiao Xiang) is a rural township in You County, Zhuzhou City, Hunan Province, People's Republic of China.

== Cityscape ==
The township is divided into 11 villages, which includes the following areas: Lianhe Village, Ningjiaping Village, Longwang Village, Pingshuang Village, Pingtang Village, Pingtai Village, Shuangsong Village, Shuangfan Village, Longquan Village, Biwu Village, and Huanggong Village.
