= Yatangpu, You County =

Yatangpu Township
- Township

Chinese transcription(s)
  - Simplified: 鸭塘铺乡
  - Traditional: 鴨塘鋪鄉
  - Pinyin: Yatangpu Xiang
- Location in China
- Coordinates: 27°04′00″N 113°16′13″E
- Country: People's Republic of China
- Province: Hunan
- City: Zhuzhou
- County: You County

Area
  - Total: 76.54 km^{2} (29.55 sq mi)

Population
  - Total: 31,100
  - Density: 406/km^{2} (1,050/sq mi)
- Time zone: UTC+8 (China Standard)
- Postal code: 412300
- Area code: 0733

Yatangpu Township (simplified Chinese: 鸭塘铺乡; traditional Chinese: 鴨塘鋪鄉; pinyin: Yatangpu Xiang) is a rural township in You County, Zhuzhou City, Hunan Province, People's Republic of China.

== Cityscape ==
The township is divided into 10 villages and 2 communities, which includes the following areas: Longhu Community, Xiejialong Community, Hongjiazhou Village, Nijiaoxiang Village, Maoping Village, Huangshuangqiao Village, Qiujialong Village, Niutouhu Village, Aolin Village, Tongba Village, Yangmugang Village, and Yinshangang Village (龙湖社区、谢家龙社区、洪家洲村、泥脚巷村、茅坪村、黄双桥村、邱家垅村、牛头湖村、奥林村、桐坝村、杨木港村、阴山港村).
