= Hunan'ao, You County =

Hunan'ao Township
- Township

Chinese transcription(s)
  - Simplified: 湖南坳乡
  - Traditional: 湖南坳鄉
  - Pinyin: Hunan'ao Xiang
- Location in China
- Coordinates: 27°16′48″N 113°31′01″E
- Country: People's Republic of China
- Province: Hunan
- City: Zhuzhou
- County: You County

Area
  - Total: 109.94 km^{2} (42.45 sq mi)

Population
  - Total: 26,000
  - Density: 240/km^{2} (610/sq mi)
- Time zone: UTC+8 (China Standard)
- Postal code: 412309
- Area code: 0733

Hunan'ao Township (simplified Chinese: 湖南坳乡; traditional Chinese: 湖南坳鄉; pinyin: Hunan'ao Xiang) is a rural township in You County, Zhuzhou City, Hunan Province, People's Republic of China.

== Cityscape ==
The township is divided into 11 villages: Dukou Village, Tianxin Village, Daxing Village, Darui Village, Paishan Village, Longtian Village, Xiawan Village, Shuangtian Village, Daxiang Village, Zili Village, and Jinshui Village (杜口村、田心村、大兴村、大瑞村、排山村、龙田村、下湾村、双田村、大祥村、自力村、金水村).
