= Jun Li (chemist) =

American nanoscientist

- 李钧
- Education: Wuhan University; Princeton University; Cornell University
- Known for: Nanomaterials; Electrochemistry; Sustainability
- Awards: Fellow of National Academy of Inventors (2019); Fellow of Royal Society of Chemistry (2021); Fellow of International Association of Advanced Materials (2022); Distinguished Professor, Kansas State University (2023); NASA Ames Honor Award
- Scientific career
- Fields: Nanomaterials; Batteries; Electrocatalysis; 2D Materials; Electrochemistry
- Doctoral advisor: Giacinto Scoles; Keng S. Liang
- Other academic advisors: Héctor D. Abruña
- Website: Jun Li

Jun Li (born 1966) is a distinguished professor of chemistry at Kansas State University known for his research in nanoscience and nanomaterials. He is a fellow of the Royal Society of Chemistry, the National Academy of Inventors, and the International Association of Advanced Materials.

He has published over 200 journal articles with h-index 59, proceeding papers, and book chapters, and is the co-inventor of over 30 nanotechnology patent applications. He co-edited a book on Biosensors based on Nanomaterials and Devices in 2014. He is a senior editor of IEEE Transactions on Nanotechnology. He is also a recipient of the 2005 Nano 50 Innovator Awards by Nanotech Briefs.

== Education ==
Li completed his Bachelor of Science degree in chemistry at Wuhan University in China.

He pursued a Master of Science degree in chemistry at Princeton University.

He completed his Ph.D. in Physical Chemistry from Princeton University, under the guidance of his co-advisors, Giacinto Scoles and Keng S. Liang.

He carried out his postdoctoral research in electrochemistry under the guidance of Héctor D. Abruña at Cornell University.

== Career ==
Li held the position of a senior scientist at NASA Ames Research Center from September 2000 – June 2007.

He served as a tenured associate professor at Kansas State University from July 1, 2007, to June 2012 and a full professor from July 1, 2012, to June 30, 2023, at Kansas State University.

Since July 1, 2023, Li has held the position of University Distinguished Professor at Kansas State University.

== Research ==
Li's research is primarily centered on nanomaterials, renewable energy, and electrochemistry. His research in nanoscience and nanotechnology focuses on exploring uses of micro- and nano-scale devices across diverse areas such as chemical and biochemical analysis, biomedical applications, energy transformation and storage, environmental surveillance, and electronics. A large set of his research is focused on a special type of nanostructured carbon materials, i.e., vertically aligned carbon nanofibers (VACNFs).

== Awards and honors ==
- Member of the carbon nanotube logic circuit team of NASA Turning Goals Into Reality (TGIR) Award (2005)
- NASA Ames Honor Award for excellence in Commercialization and Technology Transfer (2005)
- Nano 50 Innovator Awards by Nanotech Briefs for pioneering achievements in advancing the state of the art in nanotechnology (2005)
- Professorial Performance Award, Kansas State University (2018)
- The Segebrecht Award by Kansas State University (2018)
- Fellow of National Academy of Inventors (Since 2019)
- Fellow of Royal Society of Chemistry (Since 2021)
- Fellow of International Association of Advanced Materials (Since 2022)
- Elected as University Distinguished Professor, Kansas State University (2023)

== Selected publications ==
- Li, Jun; Ng, Hou Tee; Cassell, Alan; Fan, Wendy; Chen, Hua; Ye, Qi; Koehne, Jessica; Han, Jie; Meyyappan, M. (1 May 2003). "Carbon Nanotube Nanoelectrode Array for Ultrasensitive DNA Detection". Nano Letters. 3 (5): 597–602. Bibcode:2003NanoL...3..597L. doi:10.1021/nl0340677.
- Li, Jun; Ye, Qi; Cassell, Alan; Ng, Hou Tee; Stevens, Ramsey; Han, Jie; Meyyappan, M. (14 April 2003). "Bottom-up approach for carbon nanotube interconnects". Applied Physics Letters. 82 (15): 2491–2493. Bibcode:2003ApPhL..82.2491L. doi:10.1063/1.1566791.
- Ngo, Quoc; Cruden, Brett A.; Cassell, Alan M.; Sims, Gerard; Meyyappan, M.; Li, Jun; Yang, Cary Y. (1 December 2004). "Thermal Interface Properties of Cu-filled Vertically Aligned Carbon Nanofiber Arrays". Nano Letters. 4 (12): 2403–2407. Bibcode:2004NanoL...4.2403N. doi:10.1021/nl048506t.
- Ng, Hou T.; Li, Jun; Smith, Michael K.; Nguyen, Pho; Cassell, Alan; Han, Jie; Meyyappan, M. (23 May 2003). "Growth of Epitaxial Nanowires at the Junctions of Nanowalls". Science. 300 (5623): 1249. doi:10.1126/science.1082542. PMID 12764187. S2CID 12841919.
- Nguyen-Vu, T. D. Barbara; Chen, Hua; Cassell, Alan M.; Andrews, Russell; Meyyappan, Meyya; Li, Jun (January 2006). "Vertically Aligned Carbon Nanofiber Arrays: An Advance toward Electrical–Neural Interfaces". Small. 2 (1): 89–94. Bibcode:2006Small...2...89N. doi:10.1002/smll.200500175. PMID 17193561.
- Klankowski, Steven A.; Rojeski, Ronald A.; Cruden, Brett A.; Liu, Jianwei; Wu, Judy; Li, Jun (2013). "A high-performance lithium-ion battery anode based on the core–shell heterostructure of silicon-coated vertically aligned carbon nanofibers". Journal of Materials Chemistry A. 1 (4): 1055–1064. doi:10.1039/C2TA00057A.
- Swisher, Luxi Z.; Syed, Lateef U.; Prior, Allan M.; Madiyar, Foram R.; Carlson, Kyle R.; Nguyen, Thu A.; Hua, Duy H.; Li, Jun (28 February 2013). "Electrochemical Protease Biosensor Based on Enhanced AC Voltammetry Using Carbon Nanofiber Nanoelectrode Arrays". The Journal of Physical Chemistry C. 117 (8): 4268–4277. doi:10.1021/jp312031u. PMC 3694732. PMID 23814632.
- Madiyar, Foram Ranjeet; Bhana, Saheel; Swisher, Luxi Z.; Culbertson, Christopher T.; Huang, Xiaohua; Li, Jun (2015). "Integration of a nanostructured dielectrophoretic device and a surface-enhanced Raman probe for highly sensitive rapid bacteria detection". Nanoscale. 7 (8): 3726–3736. Bibcode:2015Nanos...7.3726M. doi:10.1039/C4NR07183B. PMID 25641315.
- Li, Jun; Pandey, Gaind P. (1 April 2015). "Advanced Physical Chemistry of Carbon Nanotubes". Annual Review of Physical Chemistry. 66 (1): 331–356. Bibcode:2015ARPC...66..331L. doi:10.1146/annurev-physchem-040214-121535. PMID 25580625.
- Chen, Yazhou; Elangovan, Ayyappan; Zeng, Danli; Zhang, Yunfeng; Ke, Hanzhong; Li, Jun; Sun, Yubao; Cheng, Hansong (January 2020). "Vertically Aligned Carbon Nanofibers on Cu Foil as a 3D Current Collector for Reversible Li Plating/Stripping toward High-Performance Li–S Batteries". Advanced Functional Materials. 30 (4) 1906444. doi:10.1002/adfm.201906444. S2CID 209717212.
- Sekar, Archana; Metzger, Nathaniel; Rajendran, Sabari; Elangovan, Ayyappan; Cao, Yonghai; Peng, Feng; Li, Xianglin; Li, Jun (25 March 2022). "PtRu Catalysts on Nitrogen-Doped Carbon Nanotubes with Conformal Hydrogenated TiO "2" Shells for Methanol Oxidation". ACS Applied Nano Materials. 5 (3): 3275–3288. Bibcode:2022ACSAN...5.3275S. doi:10.1021/acsanm.1c03742. OSTI 1865176.
