= Li Jun (geoscientist) =

Chinese geoscientist

Li Jun (born 1982) is a Chinese geoscientist specializing in hyperspectral imaging for applications in remote sensing. She is a professor in the School of Computer Science of the China University of Geosciences in Wuhan, and the editor-in-chief of the IEEE Journal of Selected Topics in Applied Earth Observations and Remote Sensing (J-STARS).

== Education and career ==
Li is originally from Hunan, where she was born in 1982. She studied geographic information systems as an undergraduate at Hunan Normal University, graduating in 1984, and then shifted to remote sensing for a master's degree at Peking University in 2007. She completed a Ph.D. in electrical and computer engineering through the Instituto Superior Técnico of the University of Lisbon in Portugal, in 2011. Her dissertation, Discriminative Hyperspectral Image Segmentation, was supervised by José Bioucas-Dias.

After postdoctoral research at the University of Extremadura in Spain from 2011 to 2013, she became a professor at Sun Yat-sen University from 2014 to 2018. She later moved to the College of Electrical and Information Engineering at Hunan University, and then to her present position in the School of Computer Science of the China University of Geosciences.

She was named as editor-in-chief of J-STARS in 2020.

== Recognition ==
Li was elected as an IEEE Fellow in 2021, "for contributions in hyperspectral image processing".
