= Hong San Si Temple =

Chinese temple in Kuching, Malaysia

- Malay: Tokong Hong San Si; Chinese: 鳳山寺
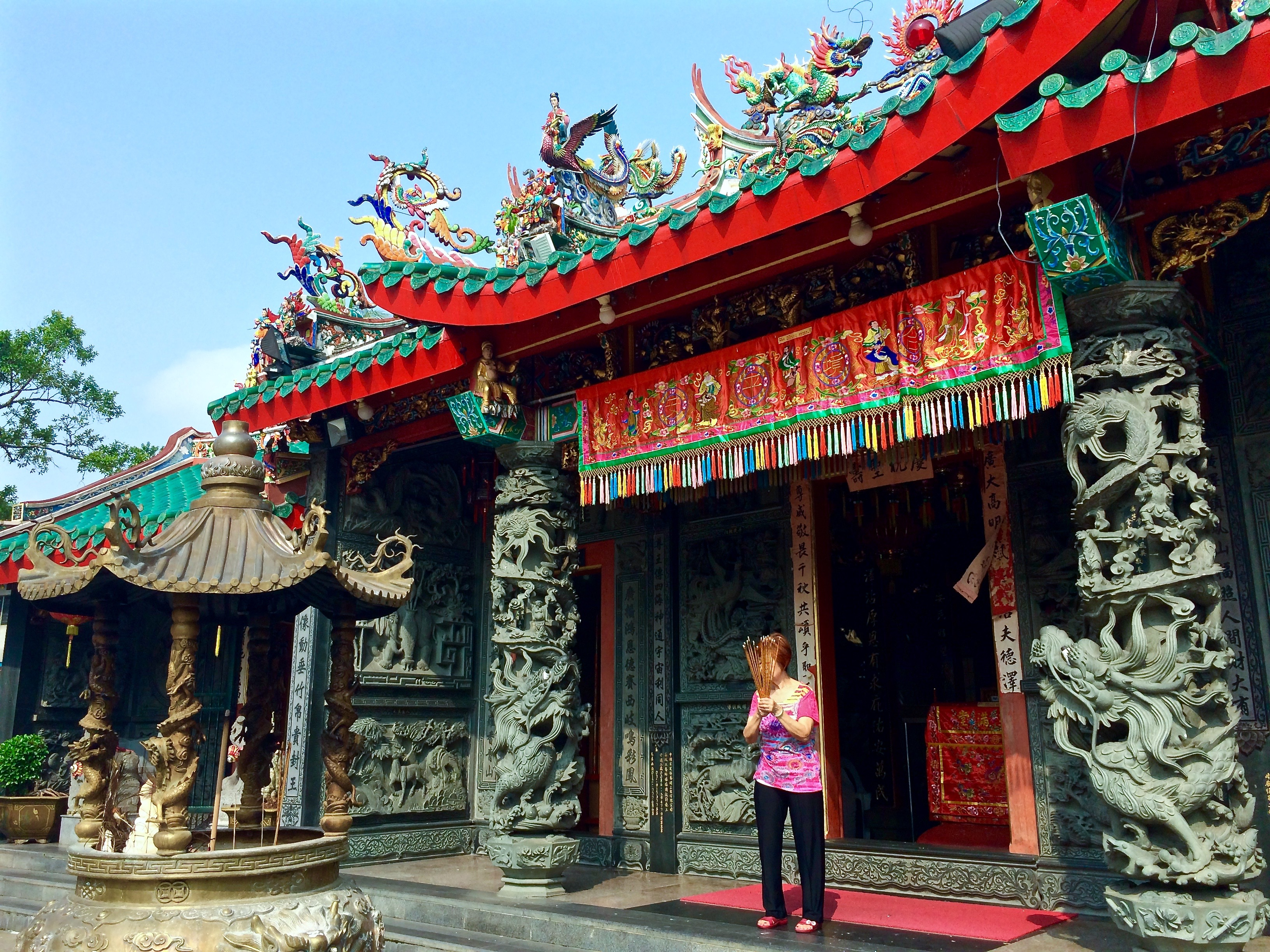

Religion
- Affiliation: Taoism
- District: Kuching District

Location
- Location: Kuching
- State: Sarawak
- Country: Malaysia
- Geographic coordinates: 1°33′26.984″N 110°20′51.87″E

Architecture
- Type: Chinese temple
- Date established: 1848

Hong San Si Temple (Chinese: 鳳山寺) is a Chinese temple situated in Carpenter Street of Kuching, Sarawak, Malaysia. It is part of the Kuching Heritage Trail.

== History ==
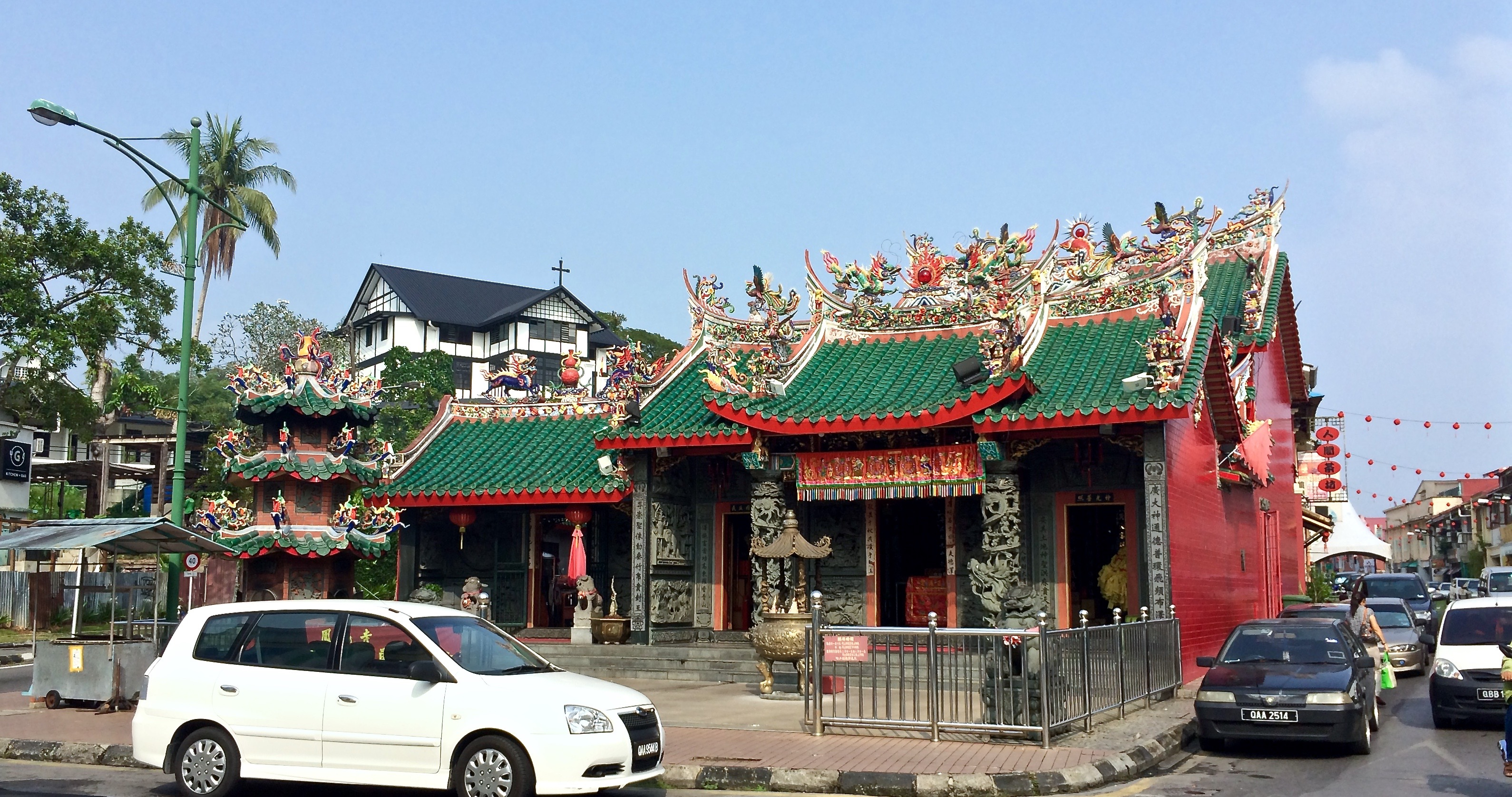
Front view of the Hong San Si Temple with the historic Carpenter Street located in right. The St. Thomas Cathedral can be seen in the left behind.

The temple has existed since 1848, and is dedicated to Hokkien child deity Kong Teck Choon Ong. According to its early history, the first Rajah of Sarawak, James Brooke saw a little boy playing with water next to the grand stage of the temple when he passed by the area and began asking the temple worshippers who had just moved to the area from mainland China about the boy, only to be told that there was no child playing in the area. The temple worshippers then said the boy is a manifestation of Kong Teck Choon Ong, which is a boy deity and adding that the emperors of many Chinese dynasties in China had honoured the deity with the name.

Amused by the story, the Rajah then instructed the temple worshippers to build a water hydrant to give respect to the deity and wishing that the town of Kuching will prosper in the future as well as requesting his subjects to complete the temple building and seek his assistance if they had faced any problems. During the Great Fire of Kuching in 1884, the locals saw the child deity appearing on the rooftops of buildings in Ewe Hai Street to give a warning to the nearby people and summoning rain to put out the fire. In 1993, the temple was declared as one of the historical buildings under the Sarawak Cultural Heritage Ordinance. The water hydrant however was torn down in the 2000s to make way for development before being replaced with a water fountain and garden by the state government in 2005. Earlier in 2004, the temple had undergone renovation works with parts of the temple building being made from new structure.
