= Guangdong Military District =

- 中国人民解放军广东省军区
- Founded: November 1949; 76 years ago
- Country: People's Republic of China
- Allegiance: Chinese Communist Party
- Type: Military district
- Role: Command and control
- Part of: People's Liberation Army
- Headquarters: Guangzhou, Guangdong

Commanders
- Commander: Rear admiral (shaojiang) Zhang Gong
- Political Commisar: Major general (shaojiang) Li Jun

Chinese name
- Simplified Chinese: 中国人民解放军广东省军区
- Traditional Chinese: 中國人民解放軍廣東省軍區
Transcriptions
Standard Mandarin
- Hanyu Pinyin: Zhōngguó Rénmín Jiěfàngjūn Guǎngdōngshěng Jūnqū

The Guangdong Military District (Chinese: 中国人民解放军广东省军区; full name People's Liberation Army Guangdong Military District or PLA Guangdong Military District) is a military district of the National Defense Mobilization Department of the Central Military Commission in China.

== History ==
The Guangdong Military District was created in November 1949. It 1960, it was under the rule of the Guangzhou Military Region.

In 2016, during the 2015 People's Republic of China military reform, the Guangdong Military District came under the jurisdiction of the National Defense Mobilization Department of the Central Military Commission.

== Leaders ==
=== Commanders ===
| Name (English) | Name (Chinese) | Tenure begins | Tenure ends | Note |
|---|---|---|---|---|
| Ye Jianying | 叶剑英 | October 1949 | April 1951 | |
| Huang Yiping | 黄一平 | July 1952 | August 1954 | |
| Zhan Caifang | 詹才芳 | August 1954 | March 1955 | |
| Long Shujin | 龙书金 | March 1955 | January 1958 | |
| He Dongsheng | 贺东生 | March 1962 | April 1964 | |
| Huang Ronghai | 黄荣海 | June 1964 | November 1969 | |
| Yang Zhen | 阳震 | November 1969 | February 1970 | |
| Zhang Jingyao | 张景耀 | April 1970 | November 1978 | |
| Su Kezhi | 苏克之 | November 1978 | July 1980 | |
| Hao Shengwang | 郝盛旺 | July 1980 | May 1983 | |
| Zhang Juhui | 张巨惠 | May 1983 | April 1992 | |
| Wen Yuzhu | 温玉柱 | April 1992 | September 2000 | |
| Liu Guoyu | 刘国裕 | September 2000 | July 2002 | |
| Lü Desong | 吕德松 | July 2002 | January 2005 | |
| Xin Rongguo | 辛荣国 | January 2005 | March 2011 | |
| Liu Lianhua | 刘联华 | March 2011 | April 2013 | |
| Gai Longyun | 盖龙云 | April 2013 | January 2015 | |
| Zhang Liming | 张利明 | January 2015 | May 2021 | |
| Zhou He | 周河 | May 2021 | July 2023 | |
| Zhang Gong | 张弓 | July 2023 | | |

=== Political commissars ===
| Name (English) | Name (Chinese) | Tenure begins | Tenure ends | Note |
|---|---|---|---|---|
| Ye Jianying | 叶剑英 | October 1949 | July 1950 | |
| Tan Zheng | 谭政 | July 1950 | June 1952 | |
| Tao Zhu | 陶铸 | June 1952 | July 1954 | |
| Song Weishi | 宋维轼 | March 1957 | October 1963 | |
| Chen De | 陈德 | October 1963 | November 1975 | |
| Xiong Fei | 熊飞 | November 1975 | August 1982 | |
| Zhang Mingyuan | 张明远 | May 1983 | August 1985 | |
| Xiu Xianghui | 修向辉 | August 1985 | November 1989 | |
| Zhang Hongyuan | 张洪远 | November 1989 | March 1994 | |
| Liu Yuanjie | 刘远节 | March 1994 | July 1998 | |
| Huang Zhizhong | 黄志忠 | August 1998 | March 2004 | |
| Cai Duowen | 蔡多文 | March 2004 | December 2011 | |
| Huang Shanchun | 黄善春 | December 2011 | July 2018 | |
| Wang Shouxin | 王守信 | July 2018 | 2024 | |
| Li Jun | 李军 | January 2024 | | |
