= Liantang'ao =

Liantang'ao Town 莲塘坳镇
- Town
- Location in Hunan
- Coordinates: 27°02′17″N 113°24′44″E
- Country: People's Republic of China
- Province: Hunan
- Prefecture-level city: Zhuzhou
- County: You

Area
  - Total: 184.3 km^{2} (71.2 sq mi)

Population
  - Total: 43,400
  - Density: 235/km^{2} (610/sq mi)
- Time zone: UTC+8 (China Standard)
- Postal code: 412315
- Area code: 0733

Liantang'ao Town (simplified Chinese: 莲塘坳镇; traditional Chinese: 蓮塘坳鎮; pinyin: Liántáng'ào Zhèn) is an urban town in You County, Hunan Province, People's Republic of China.

== Cityscape ==
The town is divided into 20 villages and eight communities, which includes the following areas: Tonglian Community, Shanbei Community, Zhehe Community, Chunlian Community, Shuangfeng Community, Chunfeng Community, Liangjiang Community, Gaolou Community, Xinhua Village, Xinchao Village, Yanlong Village, Panlong Village, Panlian Village, Jutian Village, Juzhou Village, Chuntanglong Village, Yangshengguan Village, Liaogong Village, Xinghe Village, Zhongjiang Village, Shantian Village, Xianfeng Village, Youju Village, Xiadong Village, Xiatian Village, Yinkeng Village, Yantou Village, and Nanshui Village.
