= You County =

You County 攸县
- County
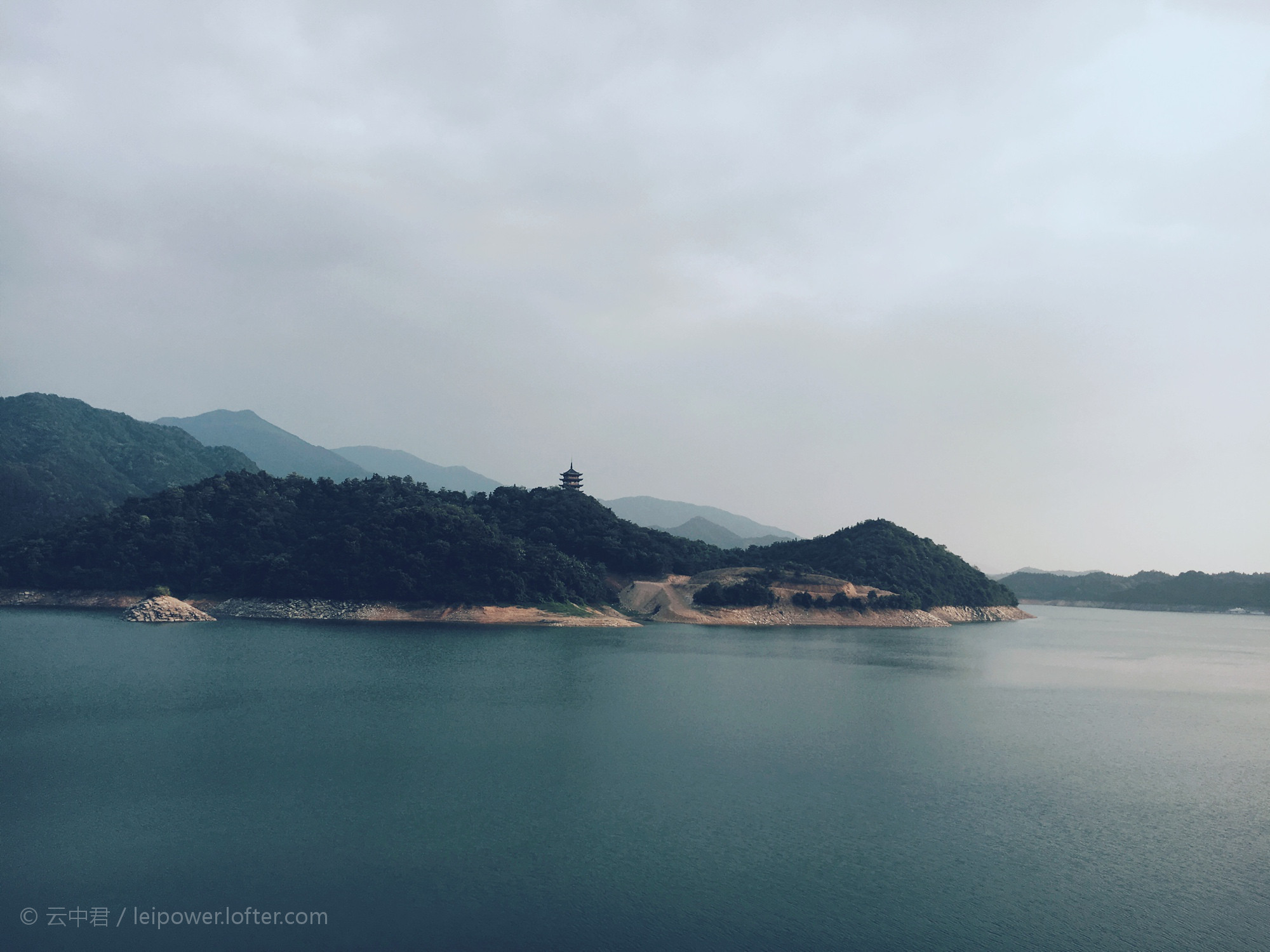

- Location in Hunan
- Coordinates: 27°00′53″N 113°23′47″E
- Country: People's Republic of China
- Province: Hunan
- Prefecture-level city: Zhuzhou
- Time zone: UTC+8 (China Standard)

You County (simplified Chinese: 攸县; traditional Chinese: 攸縣; pinyin: Yōu Xiàn) is a county in Hunan Province, China, under the administration of Zhuzhou City. Located on the south eastern margin of the province, the county is bordered to the north by Xiangdong District, Pingxiang City of Jiangxi, Liling City and Zhuzhou County, to the west by Hengdong County, to the south by Chaling County, and to the east by Lianhua County of Jiangxi. You County covers an area of 2,649 km^{2} (1,023 sq mi), and as of 2015, it had a registered population of 819,845. The county has 13 towns and 4 subdistricts under its jurisdiction; the county seat is at Chunlian Subdistrict (春联街道).

== Subdivisions ==
Name	Simplified Chinese	Population (2005)	Area (km^{2})	Note
Shangyunqiao	上云桥镇	38,200	90	
Yajiangqiao	丫江桥镇	42,890	160.64	
Baishi	柏市镇	12,060	186.5	
Wangling	网岭镇	38,560	95	
Taoshui	桃水镇	37,500	96	
Liantang'ao	莲塘坳镇	43,400	184.3	
Jiubujiang	酒埠江镇	32,800	142.6	
Chengguan	城关镇	95,300	24.05	
Datongqiao	大同桥镇	27,000	52.7	
Huangtuling	皇图岭镇	68,000	243	
Luanshan	鸾山镇	26,800	259	
Xinshi	新市镇	31,900	73	
Shiyangtang	石羊塘镇	36,000	81	
Huangfengqiao	黄丰桥镇	22,700	163.68	
Pingyangmiao	坪阳庙乡	26,000	100.4	
Jiashan	槚山乡	25,000	118	
Hunan'ao	湖南坳乡	26,000	109.94	
Yatangpu	鸭塘铺乡	31,100	76.54	

You County currently has 4 subdistricts and 13 towns.

4 subdistricts

- Chunlian (春联街道)
- Jiangqiao (江桥街道)
- Lianxing (联星街道)
- Tanqiao (谭桥街道)

13 towns

- Caihuaping (菜花坪镇)
- Huangfengqiao (黄丰桥镇)
- Huangtuling (皇图岭镇)
- Jiubujiang (酒埠江镇)
- Liantang'ao (莲塘坳镇)
- Luanshan (鸾山镇)
- Lutian (渌田镇)
- Ningjiaping (宁家坪镇)
- Shiyangtang (石羊塘镇)
- Taoshui (桃水镇)
- Wangling (网岭镇)
- Xinshi (新市镇)
- Yajiangqiao (丫江桥镇)

== Climate ==
Climate data for Youxian, elevation 115 m (377 ft), (1991–2020 normals, extremes 1981–2010)
Month	Jan	Feb	Mar	Apr	May	Jun	Jul	Aug	Sep	Oct	Nov	Dec	Year
Record high °C (°F)	25.7 (78.3)	31.3 (88.3)	35.6 (96.1)	36.1 (97.0)	36.5 (97.7)	37.7 (99.9)	40.2 (104.4)	40.3 (104.5)	38.8 (101.8)	36.2 (97.2)	32.5 (90.5)	26.0 (78.8)	40.3 (104.5)
Mean daily maximum °C (°F)	9.5 (49.1)	12.5 (54.5)	16.5 (61.7)	23.4 (74.1)	27.9 (82.2)	31.2 (88.2)	34.7 (94.5)	33.5 (92.3)	29.7 (85.5)	24.8 (76.6)	18.6 (65.5)	12.6 (54.7)	22.9 (73.2)
Daily mean °C (°F)	6.0 (42.8)	8.6 (47.5)	12.3 (54.1)	18.6 (65.5)	23.1 (73.6)	26.7 (80.1)	29.8 (85.6)	28.6 (83.5)	24.8 (76.6)	19.8 (67.6)	13.8 (56.8)	8.2 (46.8)	18.4 (65.0)
Mean daily minimum °C (°F)	3.6 (38.5)	5.9 (42.6)	9.4 (48.9)	15.3 (59.5)	19.7 (67.5)	23.5 (74.3)	26.2 (79.2)	25.2 (77.4)	21.4 (70.5)	16.2 (61.2)	10.4 (50.7)	5.2 (41.4)	15.2 (59.3)
Record low °C (°F)	−4.2 (24.4)	−3.6 (25.5)	−1.0 (30.2)	3.7 (38.7)	9.8 (49.6)	13.6 (56.5)	18.6 (65.5)	18.1 (64.6)	12.7 (54.9)	4.3 (39.7)	−1.7 (28.9)	−9.1 (15.6)	−9.1 (15.6)
Average precipitation mm (inches)	89.0 (3.50)	98.9 (3.89)	187.1 (7.37)	184.9 (7.28)	221.9 (8.74)	202.1 (7.96)	140.0 (5.51)	125.2 (4.93)	72.8 (2.87)	62.0 (2.44)	91.6 (3.61)	65.7 (2.59)	1,541.2 (60.69)
Average precipitation days (≥ 0.1 mm)	15.8	15.3	19.5	17.7	16.5	15.0	10.2	12.2	9.4	9.7	11.6	11.8	164.7
Average snowy days	3.4	1.6	0.4	0	0	0	0	0	0	0	0.1	0.8	6.3
Average relative humidity (%)	82	81	82	80	79	79	71	75	77	76	78	78	78
Mean monthly sunshine hours	52.4	56.7	62.9	97.7	129.0	135.8	227.5	191.4	148.4	127.2	107.5	89.9	1,426.4
Percentage possible sunshine	16	18	17	25	31	33	54	48	41	36	33	28	32
Source: China Meteorological Administration

== Politics ==
On December 28, 2018, the Chinese Communist Party Committee Secretary of You County Tan Runhong (Chinese: 谭润洪) was expelled from the Chinese Communist Party and removed from public office for serious violations of laws and regulations.

== Notable people ==
- Liu Dingxin, a major general in the People's Liberation Army of China who served as political commissar of the PLA Hainan Military District from 2007 to 2012.
- Liu Yuanjie, a lieutenant general in the People's Liberation Army of China who served as political commissar of the PLA Guangdong Military District from 1994 to 1998.
- Zhou Yushu, a lieutenant general in the People's Liberation Army of China who served as commander of the People's Armed Police from 1990 to 1992.
