= Chinese History Museum =

Museum in Kuching, Sawarak, Malaysia

Chinese History Museum Kuching
- Muzium Sejarah Cina Kuching
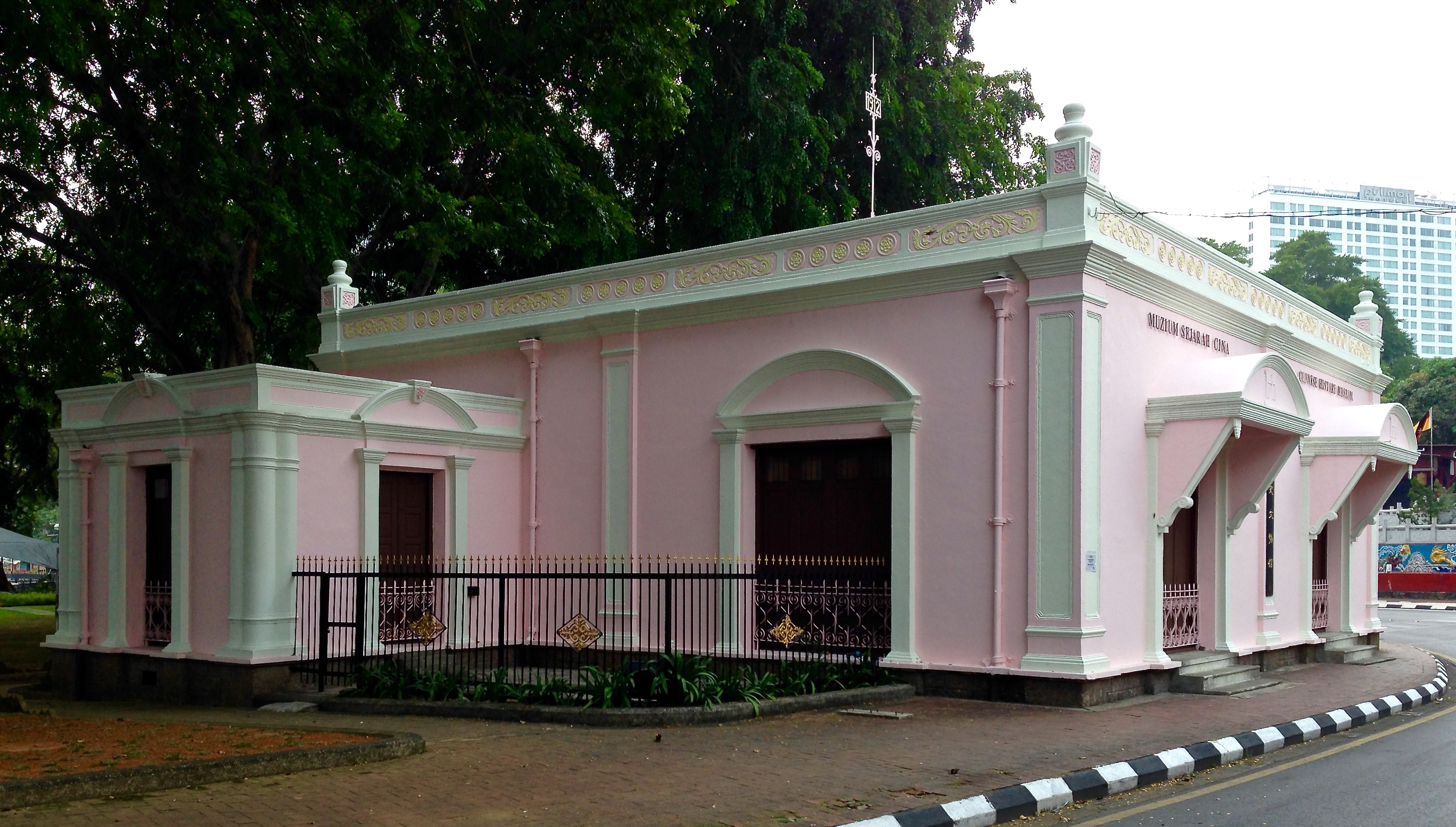
- Established: 23 October 1993
- Location: Kuching, Sarawak, Malaysia
- Coordinates: 1°33′27.6″N 110°20′55.5″E
- Type: museum

The Chinese History Museum Kuching (Malay: Muzium Sejarah Cina Kuching) is a museum in Kuching, Sarawak, Malaysia. The museum is about the history of the Chinese people in Sarawak.

== History ==
The museum building was originally constructed in 1912 as the headquarter of the Sarawak Chinese Chamber of Commerce. It was used as the commerce headquarters until 1921. It was later converted into the Chinese History Museum Kuching and officially opened to the public by Assistant Minister of Culture, Youth and Sports Yap Chin Loi on 23 October 1993. In 2010, the museum exhibition underwent renovation in which short videos were added to the display.

== Exhibitions ==
The museum displays various artifacts related to Chinese people of Sarawak during the White Rajahs era, such as ceramics, jade, musical instruments, photos etc.

== See also ==
- List of museums in Malaysia
- Malaysian Chinese
