= Anxi County =

Anxi County 安溪县 Anki; Anchi
- County
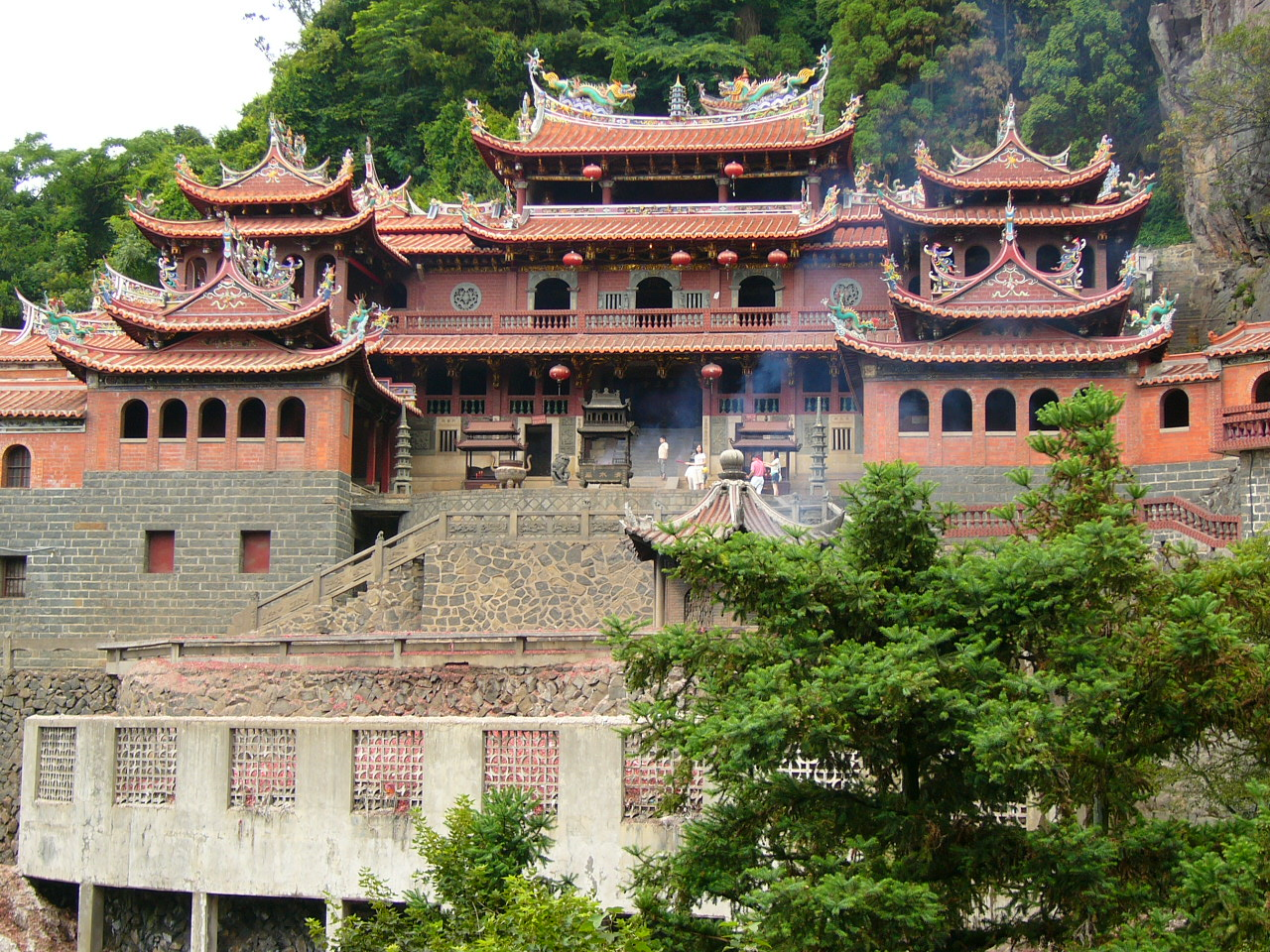
- Qingshuiyan Temple in 2006

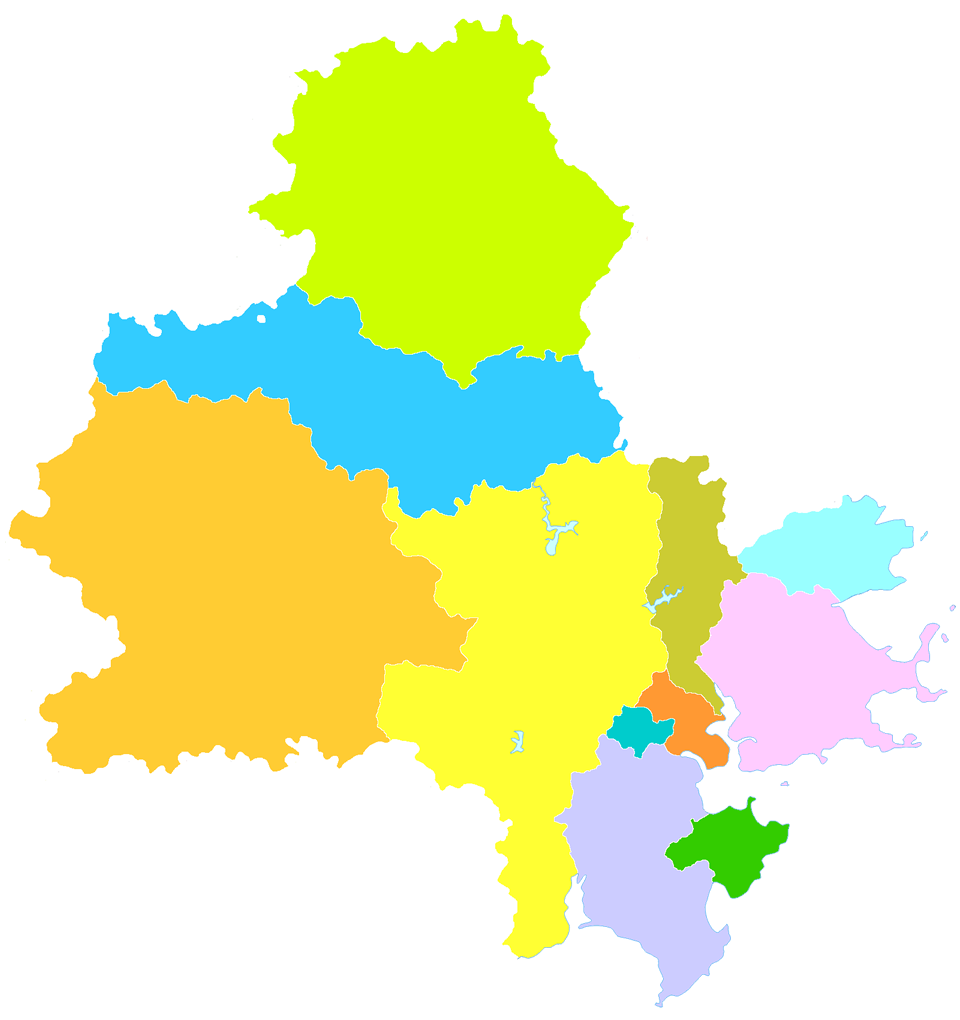
- Anxi County in Quanzhou

- Location in Fujian Anxi (China)
- Coordinates: 25°03′N 118°11′E
- Country: People's Republic of China
- Province: Fujian
- Prefecture-level city: Quanzhou

Area
  - County: 1,156 sq mi (2,994 km^{2})

Population (2020 census)
  - County: 1,003,599
  - Density: 868.2/sq mi (335.2/km^{2})
  - Urban: 498,061
  - Rural: 505,538
- Time zone: UTC+8 (China Standard)

Anxi (Anxi County; simplified Chinese: 安溪县; traditional Chinese: 安溪縣; pinyin: Ānxī Xiàn; Tâi-lô: An-khue-kuīnn) is a county of the prefecture-level city of Quanzhou, in southern Fujian province, People's Republic of China with 1,003,599 inhabitants (2020 census). It lies adjacent to and directly north of Xiamen city.

Anxi is well known for a number of varieties of Oolong tea, the best-known of which is Tieguanyin (铁观音, "Iron Boddhisatva of Mercy"). Anxi Tieguanyin (安溪铁观音) is classified as one of the Top 10 Chinese Tea.

In recent years, Anxi is known as the "scam town" of China, due to the considerable number of scammers originating from here in the 2023 Singapore money laundering case.

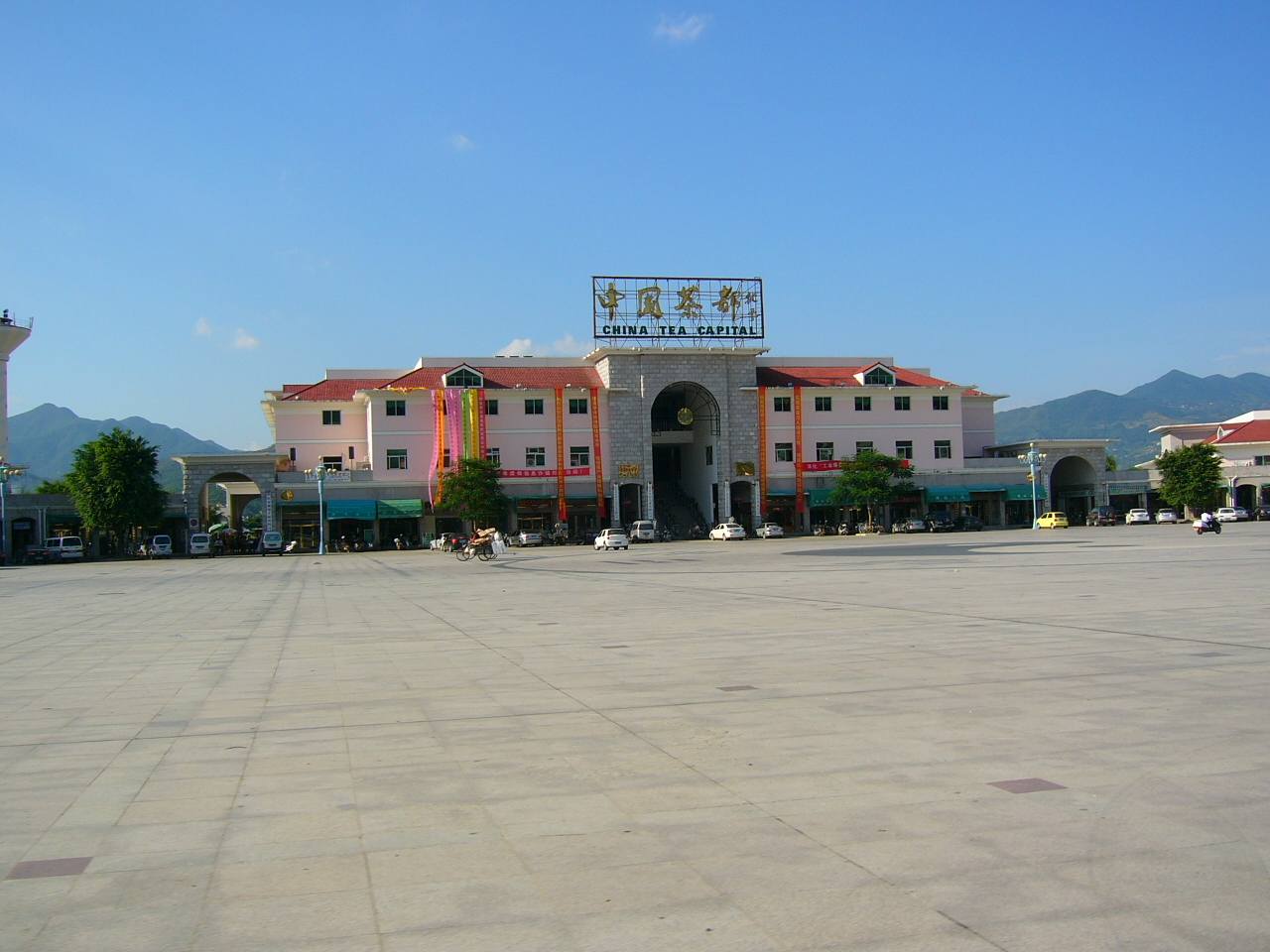
China Tea Capital

== Attractions ==
Qingshuiyan (simplified Chinese: 清水岩; traditional Chinese: 清水巖; pinyin: Qīngshuǐ Yán; Pe̍h-ōe-jī: Chheng-chúi-giâm) is a mountain hosting a very large Buddhist temple.

China Tea Capital (Chinese: 中国茶都; pinyin: Zhōngguó Chá Dū) is a large center dedicated to showcasing Anxi County's famous tieguanyin tea.

== Administration ==
The county executive, legislature and judiciary are in Fengcheng Town (simplified Chinese: 凤城镇; traditional Chinese: 鳳城鎮; Pe̍h-ōe-jī: Hōng-siâⁿ-tìn), together with the CPC and PSB branches.

=== Towns ===
There are 13 towns (Chinese: 镇; pinyin: zhèn; Pe̍h-ōe-jī: tìn) in Anxi County:

- Penglai (Chinese: 蓬莱镇; Pe̍h-ōe-jī: Hông-lâi-tìn)
- Hutou (Chinese: 湖头镇; Pe̍h-ōe-jī: Ô͘-thâu-tìn) Famous for Hutou Rice Vermicelli: Large community of migrants residing in Kajang and Batu 11 Cheras Selangor Malaysia.
- Fengcheng (Chinese: 凤城镇; Pe̍h-ōe-jī: Hōng-siâⁿ-tìn) – the county seat
- Guanqiao (Chinese: 官桥镇; Pe̍h-ōe-jī: Kiong-kiô-tìn)
- Jiandou (simplified Chinese: 剑斗镇; traditional Chinese: 劍斗鎮; Pe̍h-ōe-jī: Kiàm-táu-tìn),
- Chengxiang (Chinese: 城厢镇; Pe̍h-ōe-jī: Siâⁿ-siuⁿ-tìn)
- Jingu (Chinese: 金谷镇; Pe̍h-ōe-jī: Kim-kok-tìn)
- Longmen (Chinese: 龙门镇; Pe̍h-ōe-jī: Lêng-mn̂g-tìn)
- Huqiu (Chinese: 虎邱镇; Pe̍h-ōe-jī: Hó͘-khu-tìn)
- Lutian (simplified Chinese: 芦田镇; traditional Chinese: 蘆田鎮; Pe̍h-ōe-jī: Lô͘-chhân-tìn)
- Gande (Chinese: 感德镇; Pe̍h-ōe-jī: Kám-tek-tìn)
- Kuidou (Chinese: 魁斗镇; Pe̍h-ōe-jī: Khoe-táu-tìn)
- Xiping (Chinese: 西坪镇; Pe̍h-ōe-jī: Se-phêng-tìn) – home of the original Tieguanyin tea shrub

=== Townships ===
There are 11 townships (Chinese: 乡; pinyin: xiāng; Pe̍h-ōe-jī: hiong) in Anxi:

- Cannei Township (simplified Chinese: 参内乡; traditional Chinese: 參內鎮; Pe̍h-ōe-jī: Chham-lāi-tìn)
- Bailai Township (Chinese: 白濑乡; Pe̍h-ōe-jī: Pe̍h-lōa-hiong)
- Hushang Township (湖上乡)
- Shangqing Township (尚卿乡)
- Daping Township (大坪乡)
- Longjuan Township (龙涓乡)
- Changkeng Township (长坑乡)
- Lantian Township (蓝田乡)
- Xianghua Township (祥华乡)
- Taozhou Township (桃舟乡)
- Futian Township (Chinese: 福田乡; Pe̍h-ōe-jī: Hok-chhân-hiong)

== Climate ==
Climate data for Anxi, elevation 131 m (430 ft), (1991–2020 normals, extremes 1981–present)
Month	Jan	Feb	Mar	Apr	May	Jun	Jul	Aug	Sep	Oct	Nov	Dec	Year
Record high °C (°F)	29.5 (85.1)	31.4 (88.5)	33.8 (92.8)	34.7 (94.5)	38.0 (100.4)	39.2 (102.6)	40.4 (104.7)	39.4 (102.9)	37.5 (99.5)	36.0 (96.8)	33.7 (92.7)	30.2 (86.4)	40.4 (104.7)
Mean daily maximum °C (°F)	18.3 (64.9)	19.2 (66.6)	21.5 (70.7)	25.8 (78.4)	29.0 (84.2)	31.8 (89.2)	34.5 (94.1)	33.9 (93.0)	31.9 (89.4)	28.6 (83.5)	24.8 (76.6)	20.3 (68.5)	26.6 (79.9)
Daily mean °C (°F)	13.4 (56.1)	14.2 (57.6)	16.5 (61.7)	20.8 (69.4)	24.3 (75.7)	27.2 (81.0)	29.2 (84.6)	28.6 (83.5)	27.0 (80.6)	23.5 (74.3)	19.7 (67.5)	15.2 (59.4)	21.6 (71.0)
Mean daily minimum °C (°F)	10.1 (50.2)	11.0 (51.8)	13.2 (55.8)	17.3 (63.1)	20.9 (69.6)	24.0 (75.2)	25.5 (77.9)	25.2 (77.4)	23.7 (74.7)	19.8 (67.6)	16.2 (61.2)	11.7 (53.1)	18.2 (64.8)
Record low °C (°F)	−1.1 (30.0)	2.1 (35.8)	1.9 (35.4)	7.7 (45.9)	13.9 (57.0)	16.6 (61.9)	22.6 (72.7)	21.5 (70.7)	16.2 (61.2)	10.7 (51.3)	4.3 (39.7)	−0.6 (30.9)	−1.1 (30.0)
Average precipitation mm (inches)	52.2 (2.06)	78.4 (3.09)	121.3 (4.78)	132.1 (5.20)	214.0 (8.43)	271.1 (10.67)	202.9 (7.99)	289.8 (11.41)	163.0 (6.42)	62.2 (2.45)	44.4 (1.75)	46.3 (1.82)	1,677.7 (66.07)
Average precipitation days (≥ 0.1 mm)	8.2	10.2	14.0	13.7	16.6	17.1	11.9	16.4	11.5	5.1	5.9	7.0	137.6
Average relative humidity (%)	73	76	77	76	78	80	75	77	74	69	70	70	75
Mean monthly sunshine hours	116.8	94.8	102.1	110.7	116.6	126.8	207.7	189.7	168.4	170.8	138.8	133.2	1,676.4
Percentage possible sunshine	35	30	27	29	28	31	50	48	46	48	43	41	38
Source: China Meteorological AdministrationAll-time May highall-time low

== Transportation ==
The area was formerly served by Anxi railway station. In the future, it will be served by Anxi West railway station.

== See also ==
- Minnan region
- Minnan people
- Minnan culture
