= Chengguan, You County =

Chengguan Town
- Town

Chinese transcription(s)
  - Simplified: 城关镇
  - Traditional: 城關鎮
  - Pinyin: Chengguan Zhen
- Location in China
- Coordinates: 27°00′28″N 113°20′02″E
- Country: People's Republic of China
- Province: Hunan
- City: Zhuzhou
- County: You County

Area
  - Total: 24.05 km^{2} (9.29 sq mi)

Population
  - Total: 95,300
  - Density: 3,960/km^{2} (10,300/sq mi)
- Time zone: UTC+8 (China Standard)
- Postal code: 412300
- Area code: 0733

Chengguan Town (simplified Chinese: 城关镇; traditional Chinese: 城關鎮; pinyin: Chengguan Zhen) is an urban town in You County, Zhuzhou City, Hunan Province, People's Republic of China.

== Administrative divisions ==
The town is divided into 12 districts: Yongjia District, Shengli District, Xuehua District, Lianxing District, Baihua District, Lianxi District, Xige District, Wenhualu District, Fukang District, Hugongmiao District, Jiangqiao District, and Wanguqiao District.
