= Caihuaping =

Caihuaping Town 菜花坪镇
- Town
- Location in Hunan
- Coordinates: 26°56′06″N 113°21′43″E
- Country: People's Republic of China
- Province: Hunan
- Prefecture-level city: Zhuzhou
- County: You

Area
  - Total: 78 km^{2} (30 sq mi)

Population
  - Total: 55,700
  - Density: 710/km^{2} (1,800/sq mi)
- Time zone: UTC+8 (China Standard)
- Postal code: 412316
- Area code: 0733

Caihuaping Town (simplified Chinese: 菜花坪镇; traditional Chinese: 菜花坪鎮; pinyin: Càihuāpíng Zhèn) is an urban town in You County, Hunan Province, People's Republic of China. As of the 2000 census it had a population of 55,700 and an area of 78 square kilometers.

== Cityscape ==
The town is divided into 16 villages and one community, which includes the following areas: Da Community, Liutang Village, Sutang Village, Sujiang Village, Liuhe Village, Tanqiao Village, Suxi Village, Donglian Village, Dongjiao Village, Dongnan Village, Caitang Village, Tanzhou Village, Caiping Village, Tan'an Village, Cailong Village.
