= Shangyunqiao, You County =

Shangyunqiao Town
- Town

Chinese transcription(s)
  - Simplified: 上云桥镇
  - Traditional: 上雲橋鎮
  - Pinyin: Shǎngyúnqiáo Zhèn
- Location in China
- Coordinates: 27°02′22″N 113°21′08″E
- Country: People's Republic of China
- Province: Hunan
- City: Zhuzhou
- County: You County

Area
  - Total: 90 km^{2} (35 sq mi)

Population
  - Total: 38,200
  - Density: 420/km^{2} (1,100/sq mi)
- Time zone: UTC+8 (China Standard)
- Postal code: 412300
- Area code: 0733

Shangyunqiao Town (simplified Chinese: 上云桥镇; traditional Chinese: 上雲嶠鎮; pinyin: Shǎngyúnqiáo Zhèn) is an urban town in You County, Zhuzhou City, Hunan Province, People's Republic of China.

== Cityscape ==
The town is divided into 10 villages and 5 communities, which includes the following areas: Qiliping Community, Wu'ao Community, Houshi Community, Songjiazhou Community, Gaoling Community, Gaochetou Village, Shangyunqiao Village, Fengjia'ao Village, Taiqingtang Village, Gao'an Village, Houlian Village, Zhenjiang Village, Dawu Village, Shalingbei Village, and Tianfu Village.
