= List of administrative divisions of Hunan =

Administrative divisions of Hunan, a province of the People's Republic of China

Hunan Province
- Province
- Capital: Changsha

Prefecture-level divisions
- Prefectural cities: 13
- Autonomous prefectures: 1

County level divisions
- County cities: 18
- Counties: 60
- Autonomous counties: 7
- Districts: 36

Township level divisions
- Towns: 1,089
- Townships: 990
- Ethnic townships: 97
- Subdistricts: 233

Villages level divisions
- Communities: 5,266
- Administrative villages: 23,929

The administrative divisions of Hunan, a province of the People's Republic of China, consists of prefecture-level divisions subdivided into county-level divisions then subdivided into township-level divisions.

== Administrative divisions ==
All of these administrative divisions are explained in greater detail at Administrative divisions of the People's Republic of China. This chart lists only prefecture-level and county-level divisions of Hunan.

Prefecture level	County Level				
Prefecture level	Name	Chinese	Hanyu Pinyin	Division code	
Changsha city 长沙市; Chángshā Shì (Capital) (4301 / CSX)	Furong District	芙蓉区	Fúrúng Qū	430102	FRQ
Changsha city 长沙市; Chángshā Shì (Capital) (4301 / CSX)	Tianxin District	天心区	Tiānxīn Qū	430103	TXQ
Changsha city 长沙市; Chángshā Shì (Capital) (4301 / CSX)	Yuelu District	岳麓区	Yuèlù Qū	430104	YLU
Changsha city 长沙市; Chángshā Shì (Capital) (4301 / CSX)	Kaifu District	开福区	Kāifú Qū	430105	KFQ
Changsha city 长沙市; Chángshā Shì (Capital) (4301 / CSX)	Yuhua District	雨花区	Yǔhuā Qū	430111	YHA
Changsha city 长沙市; Chángshā Shì (Capital) (4301 / CSX)	Wangcheng District	望城区	Wàngchéng Qū	430112	WCE
Changsha city 长沙市; Chángshā Shì (Capital) (4301 / CSX)	Changsha County	长沙县	Chángshā Xiàn	430121	CSA
Changsha city 长沙市; Chángshā Shì (Capital) (4301 / CSX)	Liuyang city	浏阳市	Liúyáng Shì	430181	LYS
Changsha city 长沙市; Chángshā Shì (Capital) (4301 / CSX)	Ningxiang city	宁乡市	Níngxiāng Shì	430182	NXH
Zhuzhou city 株洲市; Zhūzhōu Shì (4302 / ZZS)	Hetang District	荷塘区	Hétáng Qū	430202	HTZ
Zhuzhou city 株洲市; Zhūzhōu Shì (4302 / ZZS)	Lusong District	芦淞区	Lúsōng Qū	430203	LZZ
Zhuzhou city 株洲市; Zhūzhōu Shì (4302 / ZZS)	Shifeng District	石峰区	Shífēng Qū	430204	SFG
Zhuzhou city 株洲市; Zhūzhōu Shì (4302 / ZZS)	Tianyuan District	天元区	Tiānyuán Qū	430211	TYQ
Zhuzhou city 株洲市; Zhūzhōu Shì (4302 / ZZS)	Lukou District	渌口区	Lùkǒu Qū	430212	
Zhuzhou city 株洲市; Zhūzhōu Shì (4302 / ZZS)	Youxian County (Note: Official name registered by the Ministry of Civil Affairs.)	攸县	Yōuxiàn	430223	YOU
Zhuzhou city 株洲市; Zhūzhōu Shì (4302 / ZZS)	Chaling County	茶陵县	Chálíng Xiàn	430224	CAL
Zhuzhou city 株洲市; Zhūzhōu Shì (4302 / ZZS)	Yanling County	炎陵县	Yánlíng Xiàn	430225	YLX
Zhuzhou city 株洲市; Zhūzhōu Shì (4302 / ZZS)	Liling city	醴陵市	Lǐlíng Shì	430281	LIL
Xiangtan city 湘潭市; Xiāngtán Shì (4303 / XGT)	Yuhu District	雨湖区	Yǔhú Qū	430302	YHU
Xiangtan city 湘潭市; Xiāngtán Shì (4303 / XGT)	Yuetang District	岳塘区	Yuètáng Qū	430304	YTG
Xiangtan city 湘潭市; Xiāngtán Shì (4303 / XGT)	Xiangtan County	湘潭县	Xiāngtán Xiàn	430321	XTX
Xiangtan city 湘潭市; Xiāngtán Shì (4303 / XGT)	Xiangxiang city	湘乡市	Xiāngxiāng Shì	430381	XXG
Xiangtan city 湘潭市; Xiāngtán Shì (4303 / XGT)	Shaoshan city	韶山市	Sháoshān Shì	430382	SSN
Hengyang city 衡阳市; Héngyáng Shì (4304 / HNY)	Zhuhui District	珠晖区	Zhūhuī Qū	430405	ZIQ
Hengyang city 衡阳市; Héngyáng Shì (4304 / HNY)	Yanfeng District	雁峰区	Yànfēng Qū	430406	YNQ
Hengyang city 衡阳市; Héngyáng Shì (4304 / HNY)	Shigu District	石鼓区	Shígǔ Qū	430407	SIG
Hengyang city 衡阳市; Héngyáng Shì (4304 / HNY)	Zhengxiang District	蒸湘区	Zhēngxiāng Qū	430408	ZXU
Hengyang city 衡阳市; Héngyáng Shì (4304 / HNY)	Nanyue District	南岳区	Nányuè Qū	430412	NYQ
Hengyang city 衡阳市; Héngyáng Shì (4304 / HNY)	Hengyang County	衡阳县	Héngyáng Xiàn	430421	HYO
Hengyang city 衡阳市; Héngyáng Shì (4304 / HNY)	Hengnan County	衡南县	Héngnán Xiàn	430422	HNX
Hengyang city 衡阳市; Héngyáng Shì (4304 / HNY)	Hengshan County	衡山县	Héngshān Xiàn	430423	HSH
Hengyang city 衡阳市; Héngyáng Shì (4304 / HNY)	Hengdong County	衡东县	Héngdōng Xiàn	430424	HED
Hengyang city 衡阳市; Héngyáng Shì (4304 / HNY)	Qidong County	祁东县	Qídóng Xiàn	430426	QDX
Hengyang city 衡阳市; Héngyáng Shì (4304 / HNY)	Leiyang city	耒阳市	Lěiyáng Shì	430481	LEY
Hengyang city 衡阳市; Héngyáng Shì (4304 / HNY)	Changning city	常宁市	Chángníng Shì	430482	CNS
Shaoyang city 邵阳市; Shàoyáng Shì (4305 / SYR)	Shuangqing District	双清区	Shuāngqīng Qū	430502	SGQ
Shaoyang city 邵阳市; Shàoyáng Shì (4305 / SYR)	Daxiang District	大祥区	Dàxiáng Qū	430503	DXS
Shaoyang city 邵阳市; Shàoyáng Shì (4305 / SYR)	Beita District	北塔区	Běitǎ Qū	430511	BET
Shaoyang city 邵阳市; Shàoyáng Shì (4305 / SYR)	Shaoyang County	邵阳县	Shàoyáng Xiàn	430522	SDG
Shaoyang city 邵阳市; Shàoyáng Shì (4305 / SYR)	Xinshao County	新邵县	Xīnshào Xiàn	430523	XSO
Shaoyang city 邵阳市; Shàoyáng Shì (4305 / SYR)	Longhui County	隆回县	Lónghuí Xiàn	430524	SYW
Shaoyang city 邵阳市; Shàoyáng Shì (4305 / SYR)	Dongkou County	洞口县	Dòngkǒu Xiàn	430525	LGH
Shaoyang city 邵阳市; Shàoyáng Shì (4305 / SYR)	Suining County	绥宁县	Suíníng Xiàn	430527	DGK
Shaoyang city 邵阳市; Shàoyáng Shì (4305 / SYR)	Xinning County	新宁县	Xīnníng Xiàn	430528	SNX
Shaoyang city 邵阳市; Shàoyáng Shì (4305 / SYR)	Chengbu County (Note: Conventional name: Chengbu Miao Autonomous County; Chinese: 城步苗族自治县; pinyin: Chéngbù Miáozú Zìzhìxiàn)	城步县	Chéngbù Xiàn	430529	XNI
Shaoyang city 邵阳市; Shàoyáng Shì (4305 / SYR)	Wugang city	武冈市	Wǔgāng Shì	430581	CBU
Shaoyang city 邵阳市; Shàoyáng Shì (4305 / SYR)	Shaodong city	邵东市	Shàodōng shì	430582	WGS
Yueyang city 岳阳市; Yuèyáng Shì (4306 / YYG)	Yueyanglou District	岳阳楼区	Yuèyánglóu Qū	430602	YYL
Yueyang city 岳阳市; Yuèyáng Shì (4306 / YYG)	Yunxi District	云溪区	Yúnxī Qū	430603	YXI
Yueyang city 岳阳市; Yuèyáng Shì (4306 / YYG)	Junshan District	君山区	Jūnshān Qū	430611	JUS
Yueyang city 岳阳市; Yuèyáng Shì (4306 / YYG)	Yueyang County	岳阳县	Yuèyáng Xiàn	430621	YYX
Yueyang city 岳阳市; Yuèyáng Shì (4306 / YYG)	Huarong County	华容县	Huáróng Xiàn	430623	HRG
Yueyang city 岳阳市; Yuèyáng Shì (4306 / YYG)	Xiangyin County	湘阴县	Xiāngyīn Xiàn	430624	XYN
Yueyang city 岳阳市; Yuèyáng Shì (4306 / YYG)	Pingjiang County	平江县	Píngjiāng Xiàn	430626	PJH
Yueyang city 岳阳市; Yuèyáng Shì (4306 / YYG)	Miluo city	汨罗市	Mìluó Shì	430681	MLU
Yueyang city 岳阳市; Yuèyáng Shì (4306 / YYG)	Linxiang city	临湘市	Línxiāng Shì	430682	LXY
Changde city 常德市; Chángdé Shì (4307 / CDE)	Wuling District	武陵区	Wǔlíng Qū	430702	WLQ
Changde city 常德市; Chángdé Shì (4307 / CDE)	Dingcheng District	鼎城区	Dǐngchēng Qū	430703	DCE
Changde city 常德市; Chángdé Shì (4307 / CDE)	Anxiang County	安乡县	Ānxiāng Xiàn	430721	AXG
Changde city 常德市; Chángdé Shì (4307 / CDE)	Hanshou County	汉寿县	Hànshòu Xiàn	430722	HSO
Changde city 常德市; Chángdé Shì (4307 / CDE)	Lixian County	澧县	Lǐxiàn	430723	LXX
Changde city 常德市; Chángdé Shì (4307 / CDE)	Linli County	临澧县	Línlǐ Xiàn	430724	LNL
Changde city 常德市; Chángdé Shì (4307 / CDE)	Taoyuan County	桃源县	Táoyuán Xiàn	430725	TOY
Changde city 常德市; Chángdé Shì (4307 / CDE)	Shimen County	石门县	Shímén Xiàn	430726	SHM
Changde city 常德市; Chángdé Shì (4307 / CDE)	Jinshi city	津市市	Jīnshì Shì	430781	JSS
Zhangjiajie city 张家界市; Zhāngjiājiè Shì (4308 / ZJJ)	Yongding District	永定区	Yǒngdìng Qū	430802	YDQ
Zhangjiajie city 张家界市; Zhāngjiājiè Shì (4308 / ZJJ)	Wulingyuan District	武陵源区	Wǔlíngyuán Qū	430811	WLY
Zhangjiajie city 张家界市; Zhāngjiājiè Shì (4308 / ZJJ)	Cili County	慈利县	Cílì Xiàn	430821	CLI
Zhangjiajie city 张家界市; Zhāngjiājiè Shì (4308 / ZJJ)	Sangzhi County	桑植县	Sāngzhí Xiàn	430822	SZT
Yiyang city 益阳市; Yìyáng Shì (4309 / YYS)	Ziyang District	资阳区	Zīyáng Qū	430902	ZYC
Yiyang city 益阳市; Yìyáng Shì (4309 / YYS)	Heshan District	赫山区	Hèshān Qū	430903	HSY
Yiyang city 益阳市; Yìyáng Shì (4309 / YYS)	Nanxian County	南县	Nánxiàn	430921	NXN
Yiyang city 益阳市; Yìyáng Shì (4309 / YYS)	Taojiang County	桃江县	Táojiāng Xiàn	430922	TJG
Yiyang city 益阳市; Yìyáng Shì (4309 / YYS)	Anhua County	安化县	Ānhuà Xiàn	430923	ANH
Yiyang city 益阳市; Yìyáng Shì (4309 / YYS)	Yuanjiang city	沅江市	Yuánjiāng Shì	430981	YJS
Chenzhou city 郴州市; Chēnzhōu Shì (4310 / CNZ)	Beihu District	北湖区	Běihú Qū	431002	BHQ
Chenzhou city 郴州市; Chēnzhōu Shì (4310 / CNZ)	Suxian District	苏仙区	Sūxiān Qū	431003	SUX
Chenzhou city 郴州市; Chēnzhōu Shì (4310 / CNZ)	Guiyang County	桂阳县	Guìyáng Xiàn	431021	GYX
Chenzhou city 郴州市; Chēnzhōu Shì (4310 / CNZ)	Yizhang County	宜章县	Yízhāng Xiàn	431022	YZA
Chenzhou city 郴州市; Chēnzhōu Shì (4310 / CNZ)	Yongxing County	永兴县	Yǒngxīng Xiàn	431023	YXX
Chenzhou city 郴州市; Chēnzhōu Shì (4310 / CNZ)	Jiahe County	嘉禾县	Jiāhé Xiàn	431024	JAH
Chenzhou city 郴州市; Chēnzhōu Shì (4310 / CNZ)	Linwu County	临武县	Línwǔ Xiàn	431025	LWX
Chenzhou city 郴州市; Chēnzhōu Shì (4310 / CNZ)	Rucheng County	汝城县	Rǔchéng Xiàn	431026	RCE
Chenzhou city 郴州市; Chēnzhōu Shì (4310 / CNZ)	Guidong County	桂东县	Guìdōng Xiàn	431027	GDO
Chenzhou city 郴州市; Chēnzhōu Shì (4310 / CNZ)	Anren County	安仁县	Ānrén Xiàn	431028	ARN
Chenzhou city 郴州市; Chēnzhōu Shì (4310 / CNZ)	Zixing city	资兴市	Zīxīng Shì	431081	ZXG
Yongzhou city 永州市; Yǒngzhōu Shì (4311 / YZS)	Lingling District	零陵区	Linglíng Qū	431102	LIG
Yongzhou city 永州市; Yǒngzhōu Shì (4311 / YZS)	Lengshuitan District	冷水滩区	Lěngshuǐtān Qū	431103	LST
Yongzhou city 永州市; Yǒngzhōu Shì (4311 / YZS)	Dong'an County	东安县	Dōng'ān Xiàn	431122	DOA
Yongzhou city 永州市; Yǒngzhōu Shì (4311 / YZS)	Shuangpai County	双牌县	Shuāngpái Xiàn	431123	SPA
Yongzhou city 永州市; Yǒngzhōu Shì (4311 / YZS)	Daoxian County	道县	Dàoxiàn	431124	DAO
Yongzhou city 永州市; Yǒngzhōu Shì (4311 / YZS)	Jiangyong County	江永县	Jiāngyǒng Xiàn	431125	JYD
Yongzhou city 永州市; Yǒngzhōu Shì (4311 / YZS)	Ningyuan County	宁远县	Nīngyuǎn Xiàn	431126	NYN
Yongzhou city 永州市; Yǒngzhōu Shì (4311 / YZS)	Lanshan County	蓝山县	Lánshān Xiàn	431127	LNS
Yongzhou city 永州市; Yǒngzhōu Shì (4311 / YZS)	Xintian County	新田县	Xīntián Xiàn	431128	XTN
Yongzhou city 永州市; Yǒngzhōu Shì (4311 / YZS)	Jianghua County (Note: Conventional name: Jianghua Yao Autonomous County; Chinese: 江华瑶族自治县; pinyin: Jiānghuá Yáozǔ Zìzhìxiàn)	江华县	Jiānghuá Xiàn	431129	JHX
Yongzhou city 永州市; Yǒngzhōu Shì (4311 / YZS)	Qiyang City	祁阳市	Qíyáng Shì	431181	QIY
Huaihua city 怀化市; Huáihuà Shì (4312 / HHS)	Hecheng District	鹤城区	Hèchéng Qū	431202	HCG
Huaihua city 怀化市; Huáihuà Shì (4312 / HHS)	Zhongfang County	中方县	Zhōngfāng Xiàn	431221	ZFX
Huaihua city 怀化市; Huáihuà Shì (4312 / HHS)	Yuanling County	沅陵县	Yuánlíng Xiàn	431222	YNL
Huaihua city 怀化市; Huáihuà Shì (4312 / HHS)	Chenxi County	辰溪县	Chénxi Xiàn	431223	CXX
Huaihua city 怀化市; Huáihuà Shì (4312 / HHS)	Xupu County	溆浦县	Xùpǔ Xiàn	431224	XUP
Huaihua city 怀化市; Huáihuà Shì (4312 / HHS)	Huitong County	会同县	Huìtōng Xiàn	431225	HTG
Huaihua city 怀化市; Huáihuà Shì (4312 / HHS)	Mayang County (Note: Conventional name: Mayang Miao Autonomous County; Chinese: 麻阳苗族自治县; pinyin: Máyáng Miáozú Zìzhìxiàn)	麻阳县	Máyáng Xiàn	431226	MYX
Huaihua city 怀化市; Huáihuà Shì (4312 / HHS)	Xinhuang County (Note: Conventional name: Xinhuang Dong Autonomous County; Chinese: 新晃侗族自治县; pinyin: Xīnhuǎng Dòngzú Zìzhìxiàn)	新晃县	Xīnhuǎng Xiàn	431227	XHD
Huaihua city 怀化市; Huáihuà Shì (4312 / HHS)	Zhijiang County (Note: Conventional name: Zhijiang Dong Autonomous County; Chinese: 芷江侗族自治县; pinyin: Zhǐjiāng Dòngzú Zìzhìxiàn)	芷江县	Zhǐjiāng Xiàn	431228	ZJX
Huaihua city 怀化市; Huáihuà Shì (4312 / HHS)	Jingzhou County (Note: Conventional name: Jingzhou Miao and Dong Autonomous County; Chinese: 靖州苗族侗族自治县; pinyin: Jìngzhōu Miáozú Dòngzú Zìzhìxiàn)	靖州县	Jìngzhōu Xiàn	431229	JZO
Huaihua city 怀化市; Huáihuà Shì (4312 / HHS)	Tongdao County (Note: Conventional name: Tongdao Dong Autonomous County; Chinese: 通道侗族自治县; pinyin: Tōngdào Dòngzú Zìzhìxiàn)	通道县	Tōngdào Xiàn	431230	TDD
Huaihua city 怀化市; Huáihuà Shì (4312 / HHS)	Hongjiang city	洪江市	Hóngjiāng Shì	431281	HGJ
Loudi city 娄底市; Lóudǐ Shì (4313 / LDI)	Louxing District	娄星区	Lóuxīng Qū	431302	LOX
Loudi city 娄底市; Lóudǐ Shì (4313 / LDI)	Shuangfeng County	双峰县	Shuāngfēng Xiàn	431321	SFX
Loudi city 娄底市; Lóudǐ Shì (4313 / LDI)	Xinhua County	新化县	Xīnhuà Xiàn	431322	XNH
Loudi city 娄底市; Lóudǐ Shì (4313 / LDI)	Lengshuijiang city	冷水江市	Lěngshuǐjiāng Shì	431381	LSJ
Loudi city 娄底市; Lóudǐ Shì (4313 / LDI)	Lianyuan city	涟源市	Liányuán Shì	431382	LYU
Xiangxi Prefecture (Note: Conventional name: Xiangxi Tujia and Miao Autonomous Prefecture; Chinese: 湘西土家族苗族自治州; pinyin: Xiāngxī Tǔjiāzú Miáozú Zìzhìzhōu) 湘西州; Xiāngxī Zhōu (4331 / XXZ)	Jishou city	吉首市	Jíshǒu Shì	433101	JSO
Xiangxi Prefecture 湘西州; Xiāngxī Zhōu (4331 / XXZ)	Luxi County	泸溪县	Lúxī Xiàn	433122	LXW
Xiangxi Prefecture 湘西州; Xiāngxī Zhōu (4331 / XXZ)	Fenghuang County	凤凰县	Fènghuáng Xiàn	433123	FHX
Xiangxi Prefecture 湘西州; Xiāngxī Zhōu (4331 / XXZ)	Huayuan County	花垣县	Huāyuán Xiàn	433124	HYH
Xiangxi Prefecture 湘西州; Xiāngxī Zhōu (4331 / XXZ)	Baojing County	保靖县	Bǎojìng Xiàn	433125	BJG
Xiangxi Prefecture 湘西州; Xiāngxī Zhōu (4331 / XXZ)	Guzhang County	古丈县	Gǔzhàng Xiàn	433126	GZG
Xiangxi Prefecture 湘西州; Xiāngxī Zhōu (4331 / XXZ)	Yongshun County	永顺县	Yǒngshùn Xiàn	433127	YSF
Xiangxi Prefecture 湘西州; Xiāngxī Zhōu (4331 / XXZ)	Longshan County	龙山县	Lóngshān Xiàn	433130	LSR

== Recent changes in administrative divisions ==
Date	Before	After	Note	Reference
1980-02-20	parts of Xiangtan Prefecture	Xiangtan (P-City)	established	
1980-02-20	↳ Xiangtan (PC-City)	↳ Yuhu District	established	
1980-02-20	↳ Xiangtan (PC-City)	↳ Bantong District	established	
1980-02-20	↳ Xiangtan (PC-City)	↳ Xiangjiang District	established	
1980-02-20	↳ Xiangtan (PC-City)	↳ Yutang District	established	
1980-02-20	↳ Xiangtan (PC-City)	↳ Jiao District, Xiangtan	established	
1980-02-20	parts of Shaoyang Prefecture	Shaoyang (P-City) city district	established	
1980-02-20	↳ Shaoyang (PC-City)	Shaoyang (P-City) city district	disestablished	
1980-02-20	parts of Hengyang Prefecture	Hengyang (P-City)	established	
1980-02-20	↳ Hengyang (PC-City)	↳ Jiangdong District	established	
1980-02-20	↳ Hengyang (PC-City)	↳ Chengnan District	established	
1980-02-20	↳ Hengyang (PC-City)	↳ Chengbei District	established	
1980-07-15	parts of Lianyuan County	Loudi (PC-City)	reorganized	
1980-08-22	parts of Jiangdong District	Jiao District, Hengyang	established	
1980-08-22	parts of Chengnan District	Jiao District, Hengyang	established	
1980-08-22	parts of Chengbei District	Jiao District, Hengyang	established	
1981-01-12	Shaoshan (CC-District)	Xiangtan County	merged into	
1981-06-30	Qianyang Prefecture	Huaihua Prefecture	renamed	
1981-10-20	Yueyang County	Yueyang (PC-City)	merged into	
1982-01-22	Yongzhou (CC-Town)	Yongzhou (PC-City)	reorganized	
1982-08-03	Jishou County	Jishou (PC-City)	reorganized	
1982-12-11	Lianyuan Prefecture	Loudi Prefecture	renamed	
1982-12-24	Huaihua County	Huaihua (PC-City)	merged into	
1983-01-18	all Province-controlled city (P-City) → Prefecture-level city (PL-City)			Civil Affairs Announcement
1983-01-18	all Prefecture-controlled city (PC-City) → County-level city (CL-City)			Civil Affairs Announcement
1983-02-08	Xiangtan Prefecture	Xiangtan (PL-City)	merged into	
1983-02-08	Xiangtan Prefecture	Zhuzhou (PL-City)	transferred	
1983-02-08	↳ You County	↳ You County	transferred	
1983-02-08	↳ Chaling County	↳ Chaling County	transferred	
1983-02-08	↳ Ling County	↳ Ling County	transferred	
1983-02-08	↳ Liling County	↳ Liling County	transferred	
1983-02-08	Hengyang Prefecture	Hengyang (PL-City)	merged into	
1983-02-08	Chenzhou Prefecture	Hengyang (PL-City)	transferred	
1983-02-08	↳ Leiyang County	↳ Leiyang County	transferred	
1983-02-08	↳ Anren County	↳ Anren County	transferred	
1983-02-08	parts of Zhuzhou Prefecture	Lingling Prefecture	transferred	
1983-02-08	↳ Qiyang County	↳ Qiyang County	transferred	
1983-02-28	Loudi Prefecture	Xiangtan (PL-City)	disestablished	
1983-02-28	↳ Loudi (CL-City)	↳ Loudi District	transferred & reorganized	
1983-02-28	↳ Shuangfeng County	↳ Shuangfeng County	transferred	
1983-02-28	↳ Lianyuan County	↳ Lianyuan County	transferred	
1983-02-28	Loudi Prefecture	Shaoyang (PL-City)	disestablished	
1983-02-28	↳ Lengshuijiang (CL-City)	↳ Lengshuijiang District	transferred & reorganized	
1983-02-28	↳ Shaodong County	↳ Shaodong County	transferred	
1983-02-28	↳ Xinshao County	↳ Xinshao County	transferred	
1983-02-28	Yueyang Prefecture	Yueyang (PL-City) city district	reorganized	
1983-02-28	↳ Yueyang (CL-City)	Yueyang (PL-City) city district	disestablished	
1983-02-28	↳ Yueyang (CL-City)	↳ Yueyang County	established	
1983-02-28	parts of Yueyang Prefecture	Changsha (PL-City)	transferred	
1983-02-28	↳ Xiangyin County	↳ Xiangyin County	transferred	
1983-02-28	Shaoyang Prefecture	Shaoyang (PL-City)	merged into	
1983-02-28	Shaoyang (PL-City) city district	Qiaotou District	established	
1983-07-13	parts of Xiangtan (PL-City)	Loudi Prefecture	established	
1983-07-13	↳ Loudi District	↳ Loudi (CL-City)	transferred & reorganized	
1983-07-13	↳ Shuangfeng County	↳ Shuangfeng County	transferred	
1983-07-13	↳ Lianyuan County	↳ Lianyuan County	transferred	
1983-07-13	parts of Shaoyang (PL-City)	Loudi Prefecture	transferred	
1983-07-13	↳ Lengshuijiang District	↳ Lengshuijiang (CL-City)	transferred & reorganized	
1983-07-13	parts of Yueyang (PL-City)	Yueyang Prefecture	established	
1983-07-13	↳ Miluo County	↳ Miluo County	transferred	
1983-07-13	↳ Pingjiang County	↳ Pingjiang County	transferred	
1983-07-13	↳ Huarong County	↳ Huarong County	transferred	
1983-07-13	↳ Linxiang County	↳ Linxiang County	transferred	
1983-07-13	parts of Changsha (PL-City)	Yueyang Prefecture	transferred	
1983-07-13	↳ Xiangyin County	↳ Xiangyin County	transferred	
1983-07-13	parts of Shaoyang (PL-City)	Shaoyang Prefecture	established	
1983-07-13	↳ Shaoyang County	↳ Shaoyang County	transferred	
1983-07-13	↳ Longhui County	↳ Longhui County	transferred	
1983-07-13	↳ Dongkou County	↳ Dongkou County	transferred	
1983-07-13	↳ Wugang County	↳ Wugang County	transferred	
1983-07-13	↳ Xinning County	↳ Xinning County	transferred	
1983-07-13	↳ Suining County	↳ Suining County	transferred	
1983-07-13	↳ Mabu County (Aut.)	↳ Mabu County (Aut.)	transferred	
1984-04-06	Yueyang (PL-City) city district	Nan District, Yueyang	established	
1984-04-06	Yueyang (PL-City) city district	Bei District, Yueyang	established	
1984-04-06	Yueyang (PL-City) city district	Jiao District, Yueyang	established	
1984-05-22	parts of Xiangtan County	Shaoshan District	established	
1984-05-22	parts of Hengshan County	Nanyue District	established	
1984-06-22	Lingling County	Lengshuitan (CL-City)	merged into	
1984-12-20	Zixing County	Zixing (CL-City)	reorganized	
1985-05-24	Liling County	Liling (CL-City)	reorganized	
1985-05-24	Dayong County	Dayong (CL-City)	reorganized	
1986-01-27	Yueyang Prefecture	Yueyang (PL-City)	merged into	
1986-01-27	Shaoyang Prefecture	Shaoyang (PL-City)	mered into	
1986-09-12	Xiangxiang County	Xiangxiang (CL-City)	reorganized	
1986-09-22	Zhijiang County	Zhijiang County (Aut.)	reorganized	
1986-11-11	Leiyang County	Leiyang (CL-City)	reorganized	
1987-02-12	Qiaotou District	Dong District, Shaoyang	disestablished & established	
1987-02-12	Qiaotou District	Xi District, Shaoyang	disestablished & established	
1987-02-12	Qiaotou District	Jiao District, Shaoyang	disestablished & established	
1987-02-19	Jing County	Jingzhou County (Aut.)	reorganized	
1987-06-10	Lianyuan County	Lianyuan (CL-City)	reorganized	
1987-09-23	Miluo County	Miluo (CL-City)	reorganized	
1988-01-23	Changde Prefecture	Changde (PL-City)	reorganized	
1988-01-23	Changde County	Wuling District	established	
1988-01-23	Changde County	Dingcheng District	established	
1988-05-23	parts of Xiangxi Prefecture (Aut.)	Dayong (PL-City)	established	
1988-05-23	↳ Dayong (CL-City)	↳ Yongding District	transferred & established	
1988-05-23	↳ Dayong (CL-City)	↳ Wulingyuan District	transferred & established	
1988-05-23	parts of Changde (PL-City)	Dayong (PL-City)	transferred	
1988-05-23	↳ Cili County	↳ Cili County	transferred	
1988-05-23	↳ Sangzhi County	↳ Sangzhi County	transferred	
1988-10-11	Yuanjiang County	Yuanjiang (CL-City)	reorganized	
1988-10-30	Mayang County	Mayang County (Aut.)	reorganized	
1990-12-27	Shaoshan District	Shaoshan (CL-City)	reorganized	
1992-06-25	Xiangjiang District	Yuhu District	merged into	Civil Affairs [1992]64
1992-06-25	Yuetong District	Yuetang District	merged into	Civil Affairs [1992]64
1992-06-25	Jiao District, Xiangtan	Yuetang District	merged into	Civil Affairs [1992]64
1992-09-01	Linxiang County	Linxiang (CL-City)	reorganized	Civil Affairs [1992]96
1993-01-16	Liuyang County	Liuyang (CL-City)	reorganized	Civil Affairs [1999]6
1994-02-18	Wugang County	Wugang (CL-City)	reorganized	
1994-04-04	Dayong (PL-City)	Zhangjiajie (PL-City)	renamed	State Council [1994]25
1994-04-05	Ling County	Yanling County	renamed	State Council [1994]55
1994-04-07	Yiyang Prefecture	Yiyang (PL-City)	reorganized	State Council [1994]17
1994-04-07	Yiyang (CL-City)	Ziyang District	disestablished & established	State Council [1994]17
1994-04-07	Yiyang (CL-City)	Heshan District	disestablished & established	State Council [1994]17
1994-04-07	Yiyang County	Ziyang District	disestablished & established	State Council [1994]17
1994-04-07	Yiyang County	Heshan District	disestablished & established	State Council [1994]17
1994-12-17	Chenzhou Prefecture	Chenzhou (PL-City)	reorganized	State Council [1994]136
1994-12-17	Chenzhou (CL-City)	Beihu District	disestablished & established	State Council [1994]136
1994-12-17	Chenzhou (CL-City)	Suxian District	disestablished & established	State Council [1994]136
1994-12-17	Chenzhou County	Beihu District	disestablished & established	State Council [1994]136
1994-12-17	Chenzhou County	Suxian District	disestablished & established	State Council [1994]136
1995-11-21	Lingling Prefecture	Yongzhou (PL-City)	reorganized	State Council [1995]110
1995-11-21	Yongzhou (CL-City)	Lingling District	reorganized	State Council [1995]110
1995-11-21	Lengshuitan (CL-City)	Lengshuitan District	reorganized	State Council [1995]110
1996-03-16	Nan District, Yueyang	Yueyanglou District	disestablished & established	State Council [1996]16
1996-03-16	Nan District, Yueyang	Junshan District	disestablished & established	State Council [1996]16
1996-03-16	Jiao District, Yueyang	Yueyanglou District	disestablished & established	State Council [1996]16
1996-03-16	Jiao District, Yueyang	Junshan District	disestablished & established	State Council [1996]16
1996-03-16	Bei District, Yueyang	Yunxi District	renamed	State Council [1996]16
1996-04-22	Dong District, Changsha	Furong District	disestablished & established	State Council [1996]29
1996-04-22	Xi District, Changsha	Yuelu District	disestablished & established	State Council [1996]29
1996-04-22	Nan District, Changsha	Tianxin District	disestablished & established	State Council [1996]29
1996-04-22	Bei District, Changsha	Kaifu District	disestablished & established	State Council [1996]29
1996-04-22	Jiao District, Changsha	Yuhua District	disestablished & established	State Council [1996]29
1996-11-26	Changning County	Changning (CL-City)	reorganized	Civil Affairs [1996]86
1997-05-31	Dong District, Zhuzhou	Hetang District	disestablished & established	State Council [1997]40
1997-05-31	Nan District, Zhuzhou	Lusong District	disestablished & established	State Council [1997]40
1997-05-31	Bei District, Zhuzhou	Shifeng District	disestablished & established	State Council [1997]40
1997-05-31	Jiao District, Zhuzhou	Tianyuan District	disestablished & established	State Council [1997]40
1997-08-29	Dong District, Shaoyang	Shuangqing District	disestablished & established	State Council [1997]83
1997-08-29	Xi District, Shaoyang	Daxiang District	disestablished & established	State Council [1997]83
1997-08-29	Jiao District, Shaoyang	Beita District	disestablished & established	State Council [1997]83
1997-11-29	Huaihua Prefecture	Huaihua (PL-City)	reorganized	State Council [1997]105
1997-11-29	Huaihua (CL-City)	Hecheng District	reorganized	State Council [1997]105
1999-01-20	Loudi Prefecture	Loudi (PL-City)	reorganized	State Council [1999]7
1999-01-20	Loudi (CL-City)	Louxing District	reorganized	State Council [1999]7
2001-04-04	Jiangdong District	Zhuhui District	renamed	State Council [2001]131
2001-04-04	Chengnan District	Yanfeng District	disestablished & established	State Council [2001]131
2001-04-04	Chengbei District	Shigu District	disestablished & established	State Council [2001]131
2001-04-04	Jiao District, Hengyang	Zhengxiang District	disestablished & established	State Council [2001]131
2005-06-15	Zhishan District	Lingling District	renamed	State Council [2005]138
2011-05-20	Wangcheng County	Wangcheng District	reorganized	State Council [2011]57
2017-04-09	Ningxiang County	Ningxiang (CL-City)	reorganized	Civil Affairs [2017]73
2018-06-19	Zhuzhou County	Lukou District	reorganized	State Council [2018]88
2019-07-20	Shaodong County	Shaodong (CL-City)	reorganized	Civil Affairs [2019]71

== Population composition ==
=== Prefectures ===
Prefecture	2010	2000
Changsha	7,044,118	6,138,719
Changde	5,717,218	
Chenzhou	4,581,778	4,324,812
Hengyang	7,141,462	6,784,891
Huaihua	4,741,948	4,639,738
Loudi	3,785,627	3,783,233
Shaoyang	7,071,741	6,963,619
Xiangtan	2,748,552	2,672,069
Yiyang	4,313,084	4,309,143
Yongzhou	5,180,235	5,367,046
Yueyang	5,477,911	5,011,416
Zhangjiajie	1,476,521	1,493,115
Zhuzhou	3,855,609	3,581,820
Xiangxi	2,845,797	2,277,032

=== Counties ===
Name	Prefecture	2010
Furong	Changsha	523,730
Tianxin	Changsha	475,663
Yuelu	Changsha	801,861
Kaifu	Changsha	567,373
Yuhua	Changsha	725,353
Wangcheng	Changsha	523,489
Changsha	Changsha	979,665
Ningxiang	Changsha	1,168,056
Liuyang	Changsha	1,278,928
Hetang	Zhuzhou	309,006
Lusong	Zhuzhou	248,021
Shifeng	Zhuzhou	282,975
Tianyuan	Zhuzhou	215,371
Lukou	Zhuzhou	383,570
You(xian)	Zhuzhou	693,178
Chaling	Zhuzhou	575,303
Yanling	Zhuzhou	201,692
Liling	Zhuzhou	946,493
Yuetang	Xiangtan	501,348
Yuhu	Xiangtan	457,955
Xiangtan	Xiangtan	915,997
Xiangxiang	Xiangtan	787,216
Shaoshan	Xiangtan	86,036
Zhuhui	Hengyang	332,463
Yanfeng	Hengyang	212,997
Shigu	Hengyang	231,595
Zhengxiang	Hengyang	298,461
Nanyue	Hengyang	59,650
Hengyang	Hengyang	1,103,897
Hengnan	Hengyang	953,608
Hengshan	Hengyang	382,086
Hengdong	Hengyang	629,725
Qidong	Hengyang	980,218
Changning	Hengyang	806,521
Leiyang	Hengyang	1,150,241
Shuangqing	Shaoyang	307,980
Daxiang	Shaoyang	340,605
Beita	Shaoyang	104,609
Shaodong	Shaoyang	896,625
Xinshao	Shaoyang	743,073
Shaoyang	Shaoyang	915,600
Longhui	Shaoyang	1,095,392
Dongkou	Shaoyang	770,473
Suining	Shaoyang	351,139
Xinning	Shaoyang	560,742
Chengbu	Shaoyang	250,633
Wugang	Shaoyang	734,870
Yueyanglou	Yueyang	814,593
Yunxi	Yueyang	176,872
Junshan	Yueyang	240,668
Yueyang	Yueyang	717,032
Huarong	Yueyang	709,098
Xiangyin	Yueyang	681,075
Pingjiang	Yueyang	947,774
Miluo	Yueyang	692,280
Linxiang	Yueyang	498,519
Wuling	Changde	620,973
Dingcheng	Changde	837,563
Anxiang	Changde	525,619
Hanshou	Changde	799,497
Li(xian)	Changde	827,021
Linli	Changde	401,071
Taoyuan	Changde	854,935
Shimen	Changde	599,475
Jinshi	Changde	251,064
Yongding	Zhangjiajie	441,333
Wulingyuan	Zhangjiajie	52,712
Cili	Zhangjiajie	601,977
Sangzhi	Zhangjiajie	380,499
Ziyang	Yiyang	410,542
Heshan	Yiyang	839,265
Nan(xian)	Yiyang	725,562
Taojiang	Yiyang	769,568
Anhua	Yiyang	901,043
Yuanjiang	Yiyang	667,104
Beihu	Chenzhou	420,531
Suxian	Chenzhou	403,299
Guiyang	Chenzhou	695,918
Yizhang	Chenzhou	579,565
Yongxing	Chenzhou	572,960
Jiahe	Chenzhou	296,017
Linwu	Chenzhou	331,871
Rucheng	Chenzhou	330,254
Guidong	Chenzhou	230,948
Anren	Chenzhou	382,920
Zixing	Chenzhou	337,495
Lingling	Yongzhou	528,637
Lengshuitan	Yongzhou	479,144
Qiyang	Yongzhou	853,197
Dong'an	Yongzhou	543,453
Shuangpai	Yongzhou	163,274
Dao(xian)	Yongzhou	605,799
Jiangyong	Yongzhou	232,599
Ningyuan	Yongzhou	700,759
Lanshan	Yongzhou	332,940
Xintian	Yongzhou	329,906
Jianghua	Yongzhou	410,527
Hecheng	Huaihua	552,622
Hongjiang(qu)	Huaihua	64,960
Zhongfang	Huaihua	236,649
Yuanling	Huaihua	582,582
Chenxi	Huaihua	453,565
Xupu	Huaihua	741,014
Huitong	Huaihua	318,686
Mayang	Huaihua	343,309
Xinhuang	Huaihua	244,322
Zhijiang	Huaihua	339,437
Jingzhou	Huaihua	245,116
Tongdao	Huaihua	206,650
Hongjiang(shi)	Huaihua	413,036
Louxing	Loudi	497,171
Shuangfeng	Loudi	854,555
Xinhua	Loudi	1,110,910
Lengshuijiang	Loudi	327,279
Lianyuan	Loudi	995,712
Jishou	Xiangxi	301,460
Luxi	Xiangxi	273,361
Fenghuang	Xiangxi	350,195
Huayuan	Xiangxi	288,082
Baojing	Xiangxi	277,379
Guzhang	Xiangxi	126,756
Yongshun	Xiangxi	428,373
Longshan	Xiangxi	502,227

== See also ==
- List of County-level divisions of Hunan by population
