= List of county-level divisions of Hunan by population =

This is a list of county-level divisions in the province of Hunan by population.

== 2010 Census ==
List of county-level divisions of Hunan by population (2010 Census)
rank	County-level	Chinese	prefecture--level	population
1	Liuyang City	浏阳市	Changsha	1,278,928
2	Ningxiang City	宁乡县	Changsha	1,168,056
3	Leiyang City	耒阳市	Hengyang	1,150,241
4	Xinhua County	新化县	Loudi	1,110,910
5	Hengyang County	衡阳县	Hengyang	1,103,897
6	Longhui County	隆回县	Shaoyang	1,095,392
7	Lianyuan City	涟源市	Loudi	995,712
8	Qidong County	祁东县	Hengyang	980,218
9	Changsha County	长沙县	Changsha	979,665
10	Hengnan County	衡南县	Hengyang	953,608
11	Pingjiang County	平江县	Yueyang	947,774
12	Liling City	醴陵市	Zhuzhou	946,493
13	Xiangtan County	湘潭县	Xiangtan	915,997
14	Shaoyang County	邵阳县	Shaoyang	915,600
15	Anhua County	安化县	Yiyang	901,043
16	Shaodong County	邵东县	Shaoyang	896,625
17	Taoyuan County	桃源县	Changde	854,935
18	Shuangfeng County	双峰县	Loudi	854,555
19	Qiyang County	祁阳县	Yongzhou	853,197
20	Heshan District	赫山区	Yiyang	839,265
21	Dingcheng District	鼎城区	Changde	837,563
22	Li County	澧县	Changde	827,021
23	Yueyanglou District	岳阳楼区	Yueyang	814,593
24	Changning City	常宁市	Hengyang	806,521
25	Yuelu District	岳麓区	Changsha	801,861
26	Hanshou County	汉寿县	Changde	799,497
27	Xiangxiang City	湘乡市	Xiangtan	787,216
28	Dongkou County	洞口县	Shaoyang	770,473
29	Taojiang County	桃江县	Yiyang	769,568
30	Xinshao County	新邵县	Shaoyang	743,073
31	Xupu County	溆浦县	Huaihua	741,014
32	Wugang City	武冈市	Shaoyang	734,870
33	Nan County	南县	Yiyang	725,562
34	Yuhua District	雨花区	Changsha	725,353
35	Yueyang County	岳阳县	Yueyang	717,032
36	Huarong County	华容县	Yueyang	709,098
37	Ningyuan County	宁远县	Yongzhou	700,759
38	Guiyang County	桂阳县	Chenzhou	695,918
39	You County	攸县	Zhuzhou	693,178
40	Miluo City	汨罗市	Yueyang	692,280
41	Xiangyin County	湘阴县	Yueyang	681,075
42	Yuanjiang City	沅江市	Yiyang	667,104
43	Hengdong County	衡东县	Hengyang	629,725
44	Wuling District	武陵区	Changde	620,973
45	Dao County	道县	Yongzhou	605,799
46	Cili County	慈利县	Zhangjiajie	601,977
47	Shimen County	石门县	Changde	599,475
48	yuanling County	沅陵县	Huaihua	582,582
49	Yizhang County	宜章县	Chenzhou	579,565
50	Chaling County	茶陵县	Zhuzhou	575,303
51	Yongxing County	永兴县	Chenzhou	572,960
52	Kaifu District	开福区	Changsha	567,373
53	Xinning County	新宁县	Shaoyang	560,742
54	Hecheng District	鹤城区	Huaihua	552,622
55	Dong'an County	东安县	Yongzhou	543,453
56	Lingling District	零陵区	Yongzhou	528,637
57	Anxiang County	安乡县	Changde	525,619
58	Furong District	芙蓉区	Changsha	523,730
59	Wangcheng District	望城区	Changsha	523,489
60	Longshan County	龙山县	Xiangxi	502,227
61	Yuhu District	雨湖区	Xiangtan	501,348
62	Linxiang City	临湘市	Yueyang	498,519
63	Louxing District	娄星区	Loudi	497,171
64	Lengshuitan District	冷水滩区	Yongzhou	479,144
65	Hongjiang City	洪江市	Huaihua	477,996
66	Tianxin District	天心区	Changsha	475,663
67	Yuetang District	岳塘区	Xiangtan	457,955
68	Chenxi County	辰溪县	Huaihua	453,565
69	Yongding District	永定区	Zhangjiajie	441,333
70	Yongshun County	永顺县	Xiangxi	428,373
71	Beihu District	北湖区	Chenzhou	420,531
72	Ziyang District	资阳区	Yiyang	410,542
73	Jianghua County	江华县	Yongzhou	410,527
74	Suxian District	苏仙区	Chenzhou	403,299
75	Linli County	临澧县	Changde	401,071
76	Zhuzhou County	株洲县	Zhuzhou	383,570
77	Anren County	安仁县	Chenzhou	382,920
78	Hengshan County	衡山县	Hengyang	382,086
79	Sangzhi County	桑植县	Zhangjiajie	380,499
80	Suining County	绥宁县	Shaoyang	351,139
81	Fenghuang County	凤凰县	Xiangxi	350,195
82	Mayang County	麻阳县	Huaihua	343,309
83	Daxiang District	大祥区	Shaoyang	340,605
84	Zhijiang County	芷江县	Huaihua	339,437
85	Zixing City	资兴市	Chenzhou	337,495
86	Lanshan County	蓝山县	Yongzhou	332,940
87	Zhuhui District	珠晖区	Hengyang	332,463
88	Linwu County	临武县	Chenzhou	331,871
89	Rucheng County	汝城县	Chenzhou	330,254
90	Xintian County	新田县	Yongzhou	329,906
91	Lengshuijiang City	冷水江市	Loudi	327,279
92	Huitong County	会同县	Huaihua	318,686
93	Hetang District	荷塘区	Zhuzhou	309,006
94	Shuangqing District	双清区	Shaoyang	307,980
95	Jishou City	吉首市	Xiangxi	301,460
96	Zhengxiang District	蒸湘区	Hengyang	298,461
97	Jiahe County	加禾县	Chenzhou	296,017
98	Huayuan County	花垣县	Xiangxi	288,082
99	Shifeng District	石峰区	Zhuzhou	282,975
100	Baojing County	保靖县	Xiangxi	277,379
101	Luxi County	泸溪县	Xiangxi	273,361
102	Jinshi City	津市市	Changde	251,064
103	Chengbu County	城步县	Shaoyang	250,633
104	lusong District	芦淞区	Zhuzhou	248,021
105	Jingzhou County	靖州县	Huaihua	245,116
106	Xinhuang County	新晃县	Huaihua	244,322
107	Junshan District	君山区	Yueyang	240,668
108	Zhongfang County	中方县	Huaihua	236,649
109	Jiangyong County	江永县	Yongzhou	232,599
110	Shigu District	石鼓区	Hengyang	231,595
111	Guidong County	桂东县	Chenzhou	230,948
112	Tianyuan District	天元区	Zhuzhou	215,371
113	Yanfeng District	雁峰区	Hengyang	212,997
114	Tongdao County	通道县	Huaihua	206,650
115	Yanling County	炎陵县	Zhuzhou	201,692
116	Yunxi District	云溪区	Yueyang	176,872
117	Shuangpai County	双牌县	Yongzhou	163,274
118	Guzhang County	古丈县	Xiangxi	126,756
119	Beita District	北塔区	Shaoyang	104,609
120	Shaoshan City	韶山市	Xiangtan	86,036
	Hongjiang District	洪江区	Hongjiang City	64,960
121	Nanyue District	南岳区	Hengyang	59,650
122	Wulingyuan District	武陵源区	Zhangjiajie	52,712

=== Counties and county-level cities ===
List of counties and county-level cities of Hunan by population (2010 Census)
rank	counties or cities	Chinese	prefecture--level	population
1	Liuyang City	浏阳市	Changsha	1,278,928
2	Ningxiang County	宁乡县	Changsha	1,168,056
3	Leiyang City	耒阳市	Hengyang	1,150,241
4	Xinhua County	新化县	Loudi	1,110,910
5	Hengyang County	衡阳县	Hengyang	1,103,897
6	Longhui County	隆回县	Shaoyang	1,095,392
7	Lianyuan City	涟源市	Loudi	995,712
8	Qidong County	祁东县	Hengyang	980,218
9	Changsha County	长沙县	Changsha	979,665
10	Hengnan County	衡南县	Hengyang	953,608
11	Pingjiang County	平江县	Yueyang	947,774
12	Liling City	醴陵市	Zhuzhou	946,493
13	Xiangtan County	湘潭县	Xiangtan	915,997
14	Shaoyang County	邵阳县	Shaoyang	915,600
15	Anhua County	安化县	Yiyang	901,043
16	Shaodong County	邵东县	Shaoyang	896,625
17	Taoyuan County	桃源县	Changde	854,935
18	Shuangfeng County	双峰县	Loudi	854,555
19	Qiyang County	祁阳县	Yongzhou	853,197
20	Li County	澧县	Changde	827,021
21	Changning City	常宁市	Hengyang	806,521
22	Hanshou County	汉寿县	Changde	799,497
23	Xiangxiang City	湘乡市	Xiangtan	787,216
24	Dongkou County	洞口县	Shaoyang	770,473
25	Taojiang County	桃江县	Yiyang	769,568
26	Xinshao County	新邵县	Shaoyang	743,073
27	Xupu County	溆浦县	Huaihua	741,014
28	Wugang City	武冈市	Shaoyang	734,870
29	Nan County	南县	Yiyang	725,562
30	Yueyang County	岳阳县	Yueyang	717,032
31	Huarong County	华容县	Yueyang	709,098
32	Ningyuan County	宁远县	Yongzhou	700,759
33	Guiyang County	桂阳县	Chenzhou	695,918
34	You County	攸县	Zhuzhou	693,178
35	Miluo City	汨罗市	Yueyang	692,280
36	Xiangyin County	湘阴县	Yueyang	681,075
37	Yuanjiang City	沅江市	Yiyang	667,104
38	Hengdong County	衡东县	Hengyang	629,725
39	Dao County	道县	Yongzhou	605,799
40	Cili County	慈利县	Zhangjiajie	601,977
41	Shimen County	石门县	Changde	599,475
42	Yuanling County	沅陵县	Huaihua	582,582
43	Yizhang County	宜章县	Chenzhou	579,565
44	Chaling County	茶陵县	Zhuzhou	575,303
45	Yongxing County	永兴县	Chenzhou	572,960
46	Xinning County	新宁县	Shaoyang	560,742
47	Dong'an County	东安县	Yongzhou	543,453
48	Anxiang County	安乡县	Changde	525,619
49	Longshan County	龙山县	Xiangxi	502,227
50	Linxiang City	临湘市	Yueyang	498,519
51	Hongjiang City	洪江市	Huaihua	477,996
52	Chenxi County	辰溪县	Huaihua	453,565
53	Yongshun County	永顺县	Xiangxi	428,373
54	Jianghua County	江华县	Yongzhou	410,527
55	Linli County	临澧县	Changde	401,071
56	Zhuzhou County	株洲县	Zhuzhou	383,570
57	Anren County	安仁县	Chenzhou	382,920
58	Hengshan County	衡山县	Hengyang	382,086
59	Sangzhi County	桑植县	Zhangjiajie	380,499
60	Suining County	绥宁县	Shaoyang	351,139
61	Fenghuang County	凤凰县	Xiangxi	350,195
62	Mayang County	麻阳县	Huaihua	343,309
63	Zhijiang County	芷江县	Huaihua	339,437
64	Zixing City	资兴市	Chenzhou	337,495
65	Lanshan County	蓝山县	Yongzhou	332,940
66	Linwu County	临武县	Chenzhou	331,871
67	Rucheng County	汝城县	Chenzhou	330,254
68	Xintian County	新田县	Yongzhou	329,906
69	Lengshuijiang City	冷水江市	Loudi	327,279
70	Huitong County	会同县	Huaihua	318,686
71	Jishou City	吉首市	Xiangxi	301,460
72	Jiahe County	加禾县	Chenzhou	296,017
73	Huayuan County	花垣县	Xiangxi	288,082
74	Baojing County	保靖县	Xiangxi	277,379
75	Luxi County	泸溪县	Xiangxi	273,361
76	Jinshi City	津市市	Changde	251,064
77	Chengbu County	城步县	Shaoyang	250,633
78	Jingzhou County	靖州县	Huaihua	245,116
79	Xinhuang County	新晃县	Huaihua	244,322
80	Zhongfang County	中方县	Huaihua	236,649
81	Jiangyong County	江永县	Yongzhou	232,599
82	Guidong County	桂东县	Chenzhou	230,948
83	Tongdao County	通道县	Huaihua	206,650
84	Yanling County	炎陵县	Zhuzhou	201,692
85	Shuangpai County	双牌县	Yongzhou	163,274
86	Guzhang County	古丈县	Xiangxi	126,756
87	Shaoshan City	韶山市	Xiangtan	86,036

=== Districts ===
List of districts of Hunan by population (2010 Census)
rank	Districts	Chinese	prefecture--level	population
1	Heshan District	赫山区	Yiyang	839,265
2	Dingcheng District	鼎城区	Changde	837,563
3	Yueyanglou District	岳阳楼区	Yueyang	814,593
4	Yuelu District	岳麓区	Changsha	801,861
5	Yuhua District	雨花区	Changsha	725,353
6	Wuling District	武陵区	Changde	620,973
7	Kaifu District	开福区	Changsha	567,373
8	Hecheng District	鹤城区	Huaihua	552,622
9	Lingling District	零陵区	Yongzhou	528,637
10	Furong District	芙蓉区	Changsha	523,730
11	Wangcheng District	望城区	Changsha	523,489
12	Yuhu District	雨湖区	Xiangtan	501,348
13	Louxing District	娄星区	Loudi	497,171
14	Lengshuitan District	冷水滩区	Yongzhou	479,144
15	Tianxin District	天心区	Changsha	475,663
16	Yuetang District	岳塘区	Xiangtan	457,955
17	Yongding District	永定区	Zhangjiajie	441,333
18	Beihu District	北湖区	Chenzhou	420,531
19	Ziyang District	资阳区	Yiyang	410,542
20	Suxian District	苏仙区	Chenzhou	403,299
21	Daxiang District	大祥区	Shaoyang	340,605
22	Zhuhui District	珠晖区	Hengyang	332,463
23	Hetang District	荷塘区	Zhuzhou	309,006
24	Shuangqing District	双清区	Shaoyang	307,980
25	Zhengxiang District	蒸湘区	Hengyang	298,461
26	Shifeng District	石峰区	Zhuzhou	282,975
27	lusong District	芦淞区	Zhuzhou	248,021
28	Junshan District	君山区	Yueyang	240,668
29	Shigu District	石鼓区	Hengyang	231,595
30	Tianyuan District	天元区	Zhuzhou	215,371
31	Yanfeng District	雁峰区	Hengyang	212,997
32	Yunxi District	云溪区	Yueyang	176,872
33	Beita District	北塔区	Shaoyang	104,609
34	Nanyue District	南岳区	Hengyang	59,650
35	Wulingyuan District	武陵源区	Zhangjiajie	52,712
