= Liyu =

Liyu may refer to:

- Asian carp, known as Liyu in Chinese
- Liyu Lake, a lake in Hualien County, Taiwan named after the carp
- Liyu Subdistrict (栗雨街道), a subdistrict of Tianyuan District, Zhuzhou, Hunan, China
- Liyu, Fujian (峛屿), a town in Yunxiao County, Fujian, China
- Liyu (monarch), a king in the historic Ming dynasty tributary state of Caboloan, in what is now Philippines
- Liyu Police, a police unit established by the Somali regional government as a counter-terrorism force

== See also ==
- Li Yu (disambiguation)
