= Jianning =

Jianning (建宁/建寧) may refer to:

- Jianning (168–172), an era name used by Emperor Ling of Han

== Places in China ==
- Jianning County, a county in Fujian
- Jianning Subdistrict, a subdistrict of Lusong District in Zhuzhou, Hunan
- Jianning Township, a township in Gaoping, Shanxi

=== Historical places ===
- Jianning, the former name of Zhuzhou
- Jianning, the former name of Jian'ou
