= Li Yu =

Li Yu may refer to:

- Emperor Suzong of Tang (711–762), personal name Li Yu, emperor of the Tang dynasty
- Emperor Daizong of Tang (727–779), personal name Li Yu, emperor of the Tang dynasty, Emperor Suzong's son
- Li Yu, Prince of Dan (died 820), Emperor Daizong of Tang's son
- Li Yu, Prince of De (died 905), Emperor Zhaozong of Tang's son, briefly a puppet emperor
- Li Yu (Later Tang) (died 935), chief councilor of the Later Tang dynasty
- Li Yu (Southern Tang) (937–978, Chinese: 李煜), ruler of the Southern Tang dynasty, also a famous poet
- Li Yu (author) (1610–1680, Chinese: 李漁), Chinese author during the Ming and Qing dynasties
- Li Yu (speed skater) (born 1961, Chinese: 李雨), Chinese short track speed skater
- Li Yu (director) (born 1973, Chinese: 李玉), Chinese film director and screenwriter
- Li Yu (politician) (1906–1986, Chinese: 黎玉), Chinese politician in the People's Republic of China
- Liyuu (born 1997, stage name 黎狱), a Chinese singer, voice actress and cosplayer

== See also ==
- Liyu (disambiguation)
- Li You (disambiguation) — "Li You" is the pinyin equivalent of "Li Yu" in Wade–Giles
