= Zhuzhou High-Tech Industrial Development Zone =

Zhuzhou High-Tech Industrial Development Zone 株洲高新技术产业开发区
- High-Tech Industrial Zone
- Location in Hunan
- Coordinates: 27°49′58″N 113°05′20″E
- Country: People's Republic of China
- Province: Hunan
- Prefecture-level city: Zhuzhou
- District: Tianyuan District

Area
  - Total: 328 km^{2} (127 sq mi)
- Time zone: UTC+08:00 (China Standard)
- Postal code: 412000
- Area code: 0731

Chinese name
- Traditional Chinese: 株洲高新技術產業開發區
- Simplified Chinese: 株洲高新技术产业开发区
Transcriptions
Standard Mandarin
- Hanyu Pinyin: Zhūzhōu Gāoxīn Jìshù Chǎnyè Kāifāqū

Zhuzhou High-Tech Industrial Development Zone (Chinese: 株洲高新技术产业开发区; abbr: ZZHTZ) is a national high-tech industrial zone in Zhuzhou, Hunan, China. It covers an area of 328 square kilometres (127 sq mi). Its main industries are rail transit, general aviation and new energy vehicles.

== History ==
Zhuzhou High-Tech Industrial Development Zone was first established in May 1992. In November of the same year, it became a national HTZs approved by the State Council of China.
