= Zifu Temple =

Zifu Temple, may refer to:

- Zifu Temple (Yushe County), a Buddhist temple in Yushe County, Shanxi, China.
- Zifu Temple (Zhuzhou), a Buddhist temple in Tianyuan District of Zhuzhou, Hunan, China.
