= Zifu Temple (Zhuzhou) =

Buddhist temple in China

- 资福寺
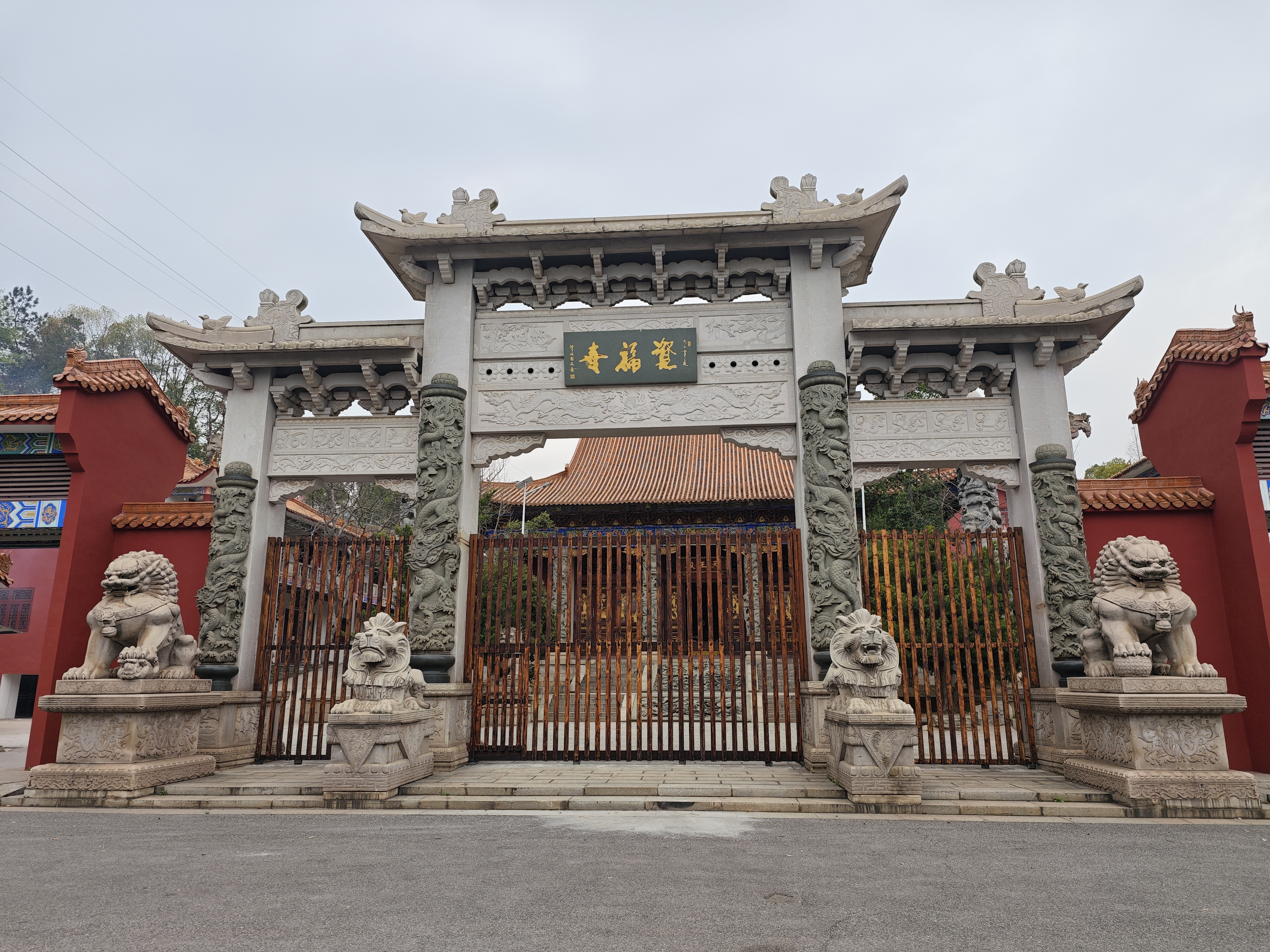
- Paifang

- Location within Hunan

Religion
- Affiliation: Buddhism
- Sect: Chan Buddhism

Location
- Location: Tianyuan District, Zhuzhou, Hunan, China
- Interactive map of Zifu Temple
- Coordinates: 27°48′12″N 113°08′14″E

Architecture
- Style: Chinese architecture

Zifu Temple (simplified Chinese: 资福寺; traditional Chinese: 資福寺; pinyin: Zīfú Sì) is a Buddhist temple located in Tianyuan District of Zhuzhou, Hunan, China.

== History ==
Zifu Temple was originally built in the Ming dynasty (1368–1644).

In 1918 during the Northern Expedition, Zifu Temple was devastated by war.

After the establishment of the People's Republic of China, the monks and nuns of Zifu Temple moved out of the temple, the Buddha statues were demolished, and the temple building was used as a mirror factory and residential housing. In 1998, Longmen Temple in Tianyuan District was renovated and renamed "Zifu Temple".

== Architecture ==
Now the existing main buildings of Zifu Temple include Shanmen, Four Heavenly Kings Hall, Mahavira Hall, Guanyin Hall, Bell tower, Drum tower, Dharma Hall, Dining Room, etc.

== Gallery ==
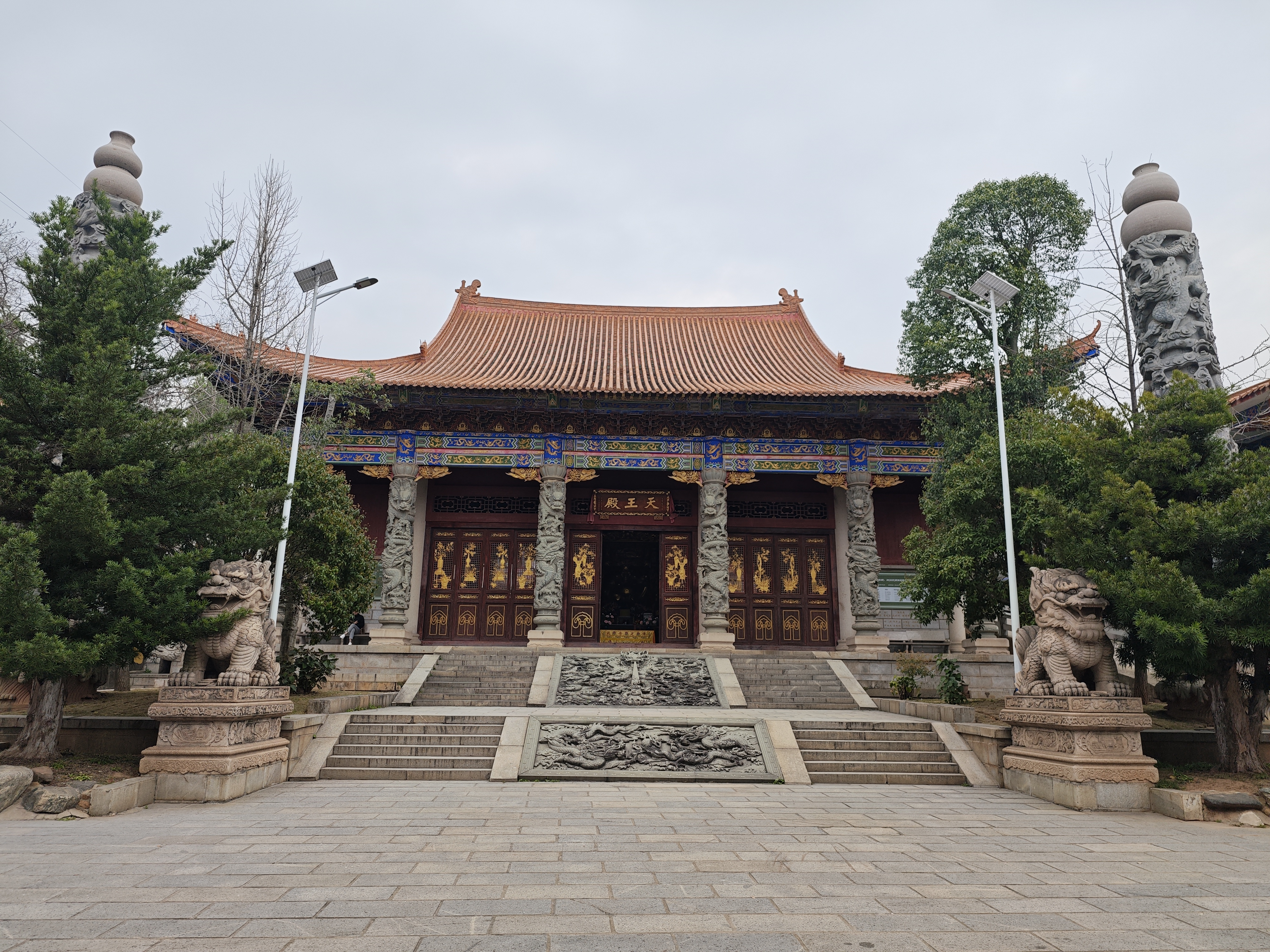
Four Heavenly Kings Hall

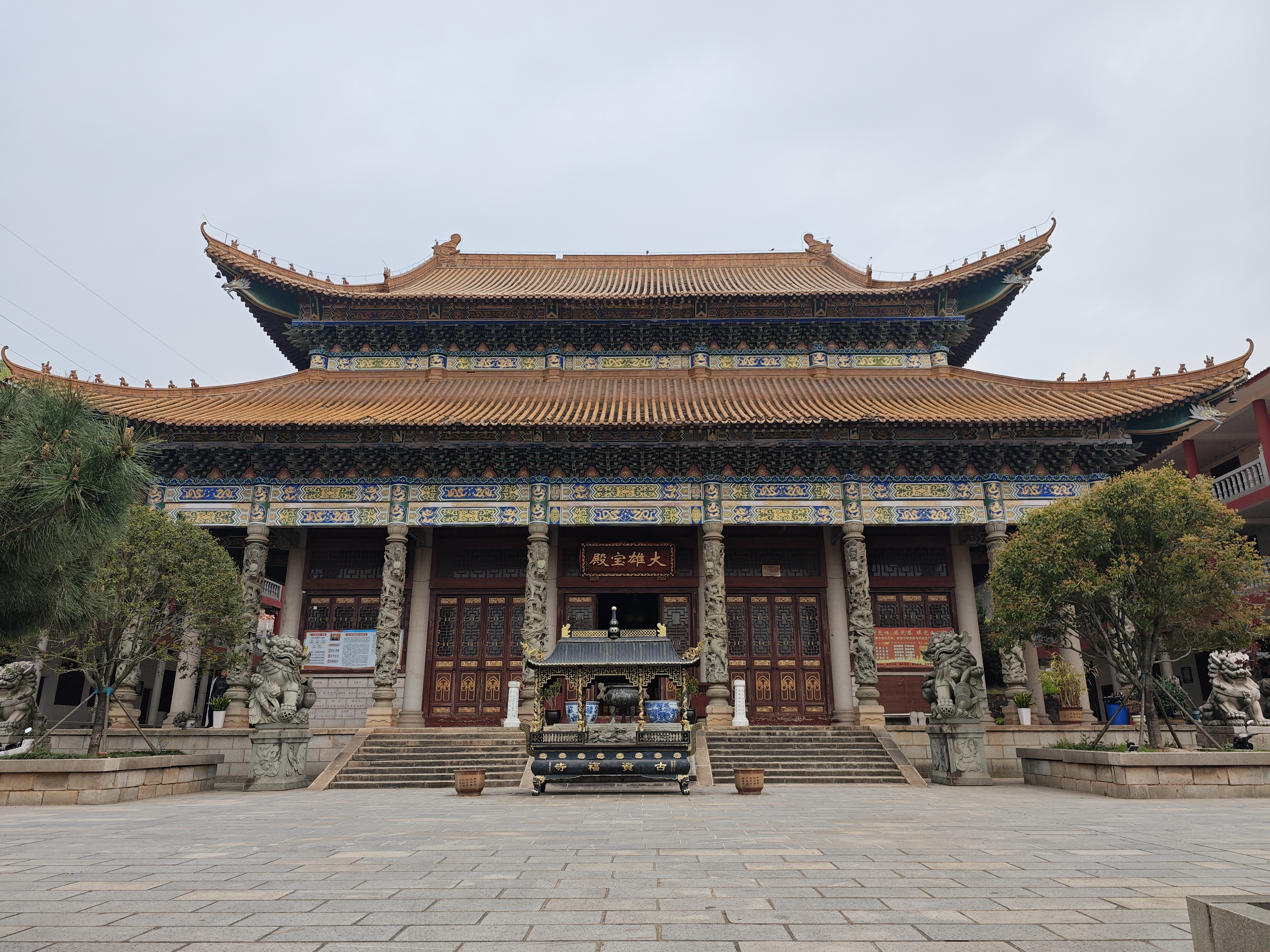
Mahavira Hall

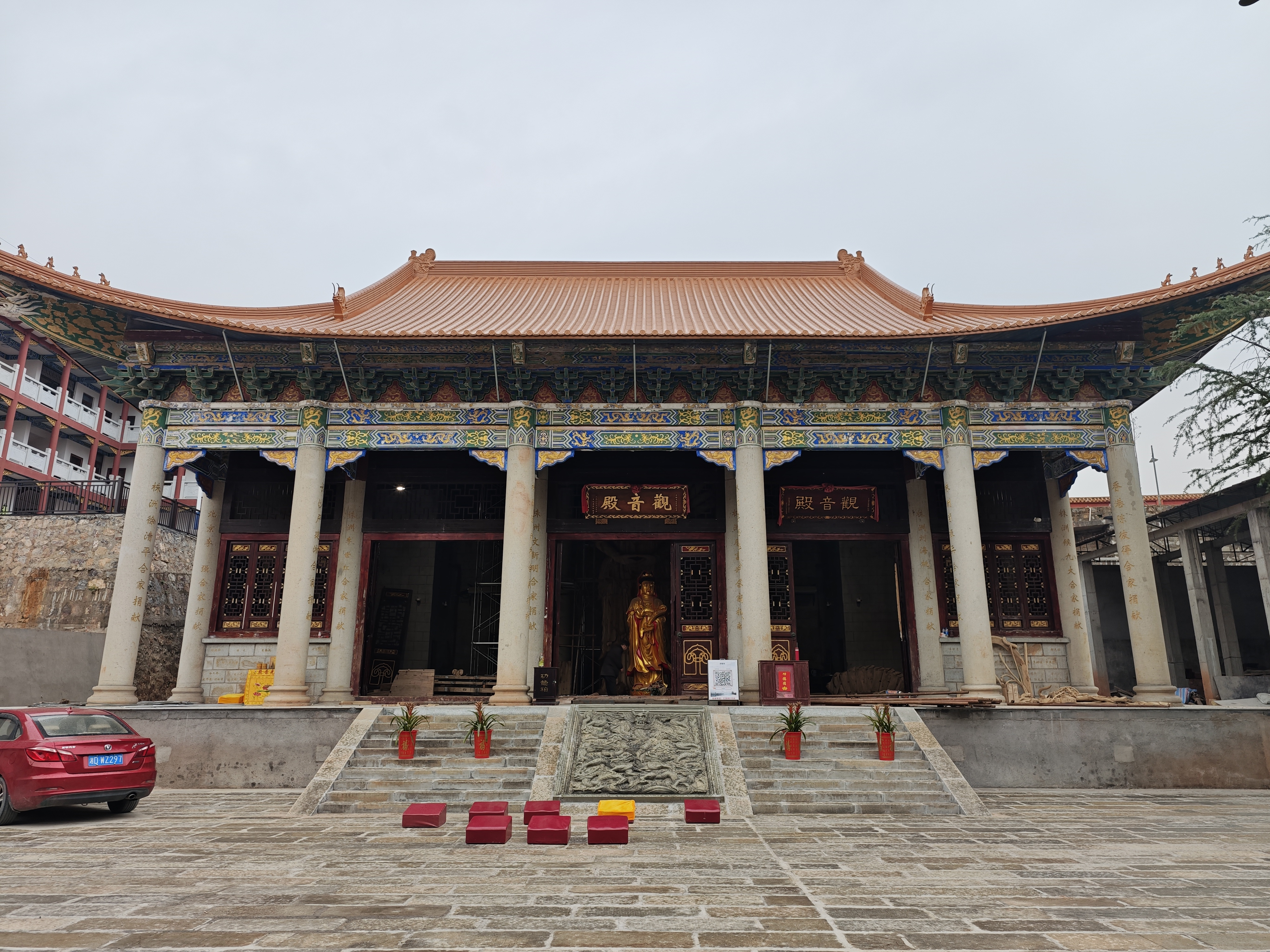
Guanyin Hall

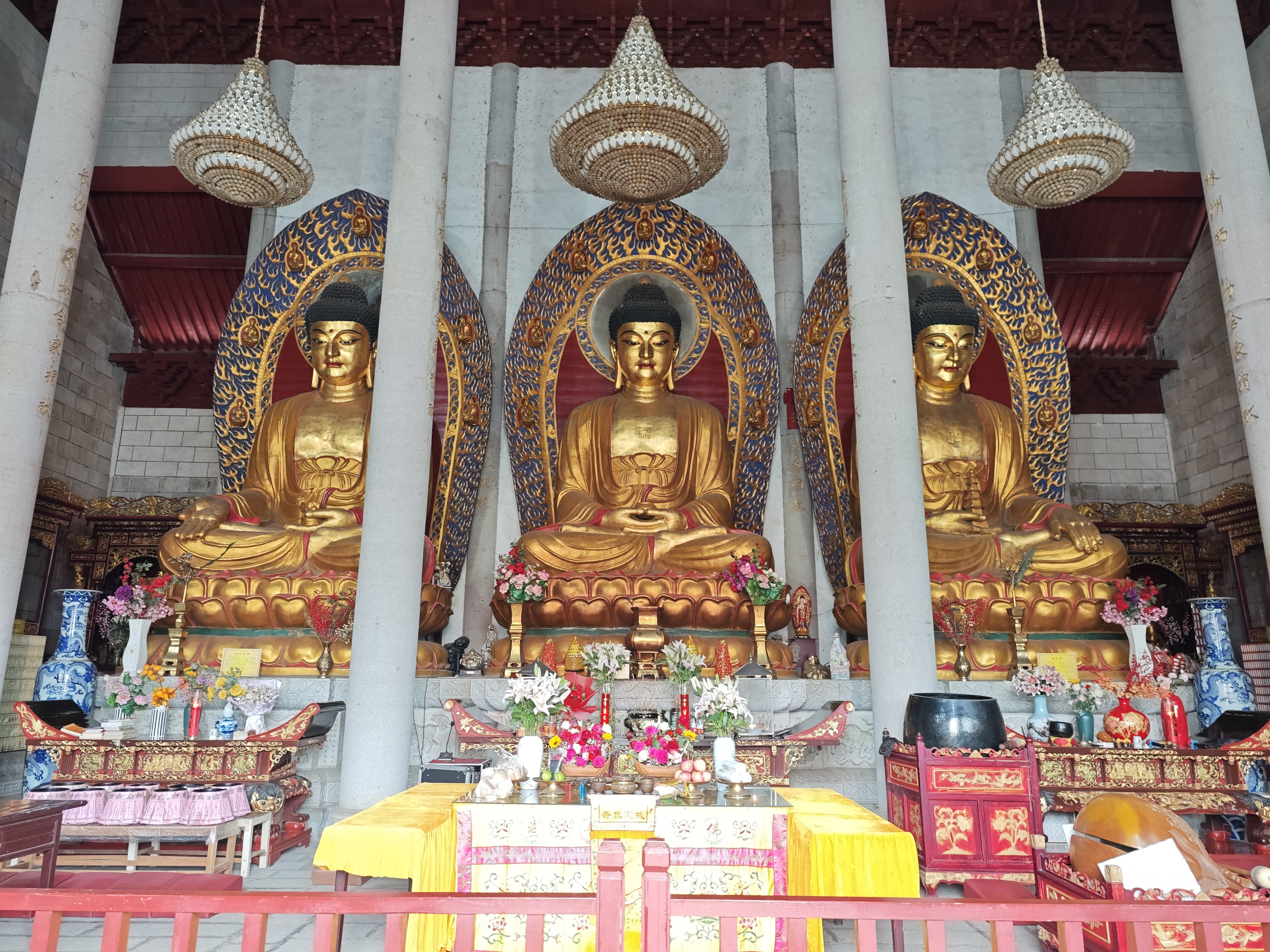
Statues of Buddha at Mahavira Hall

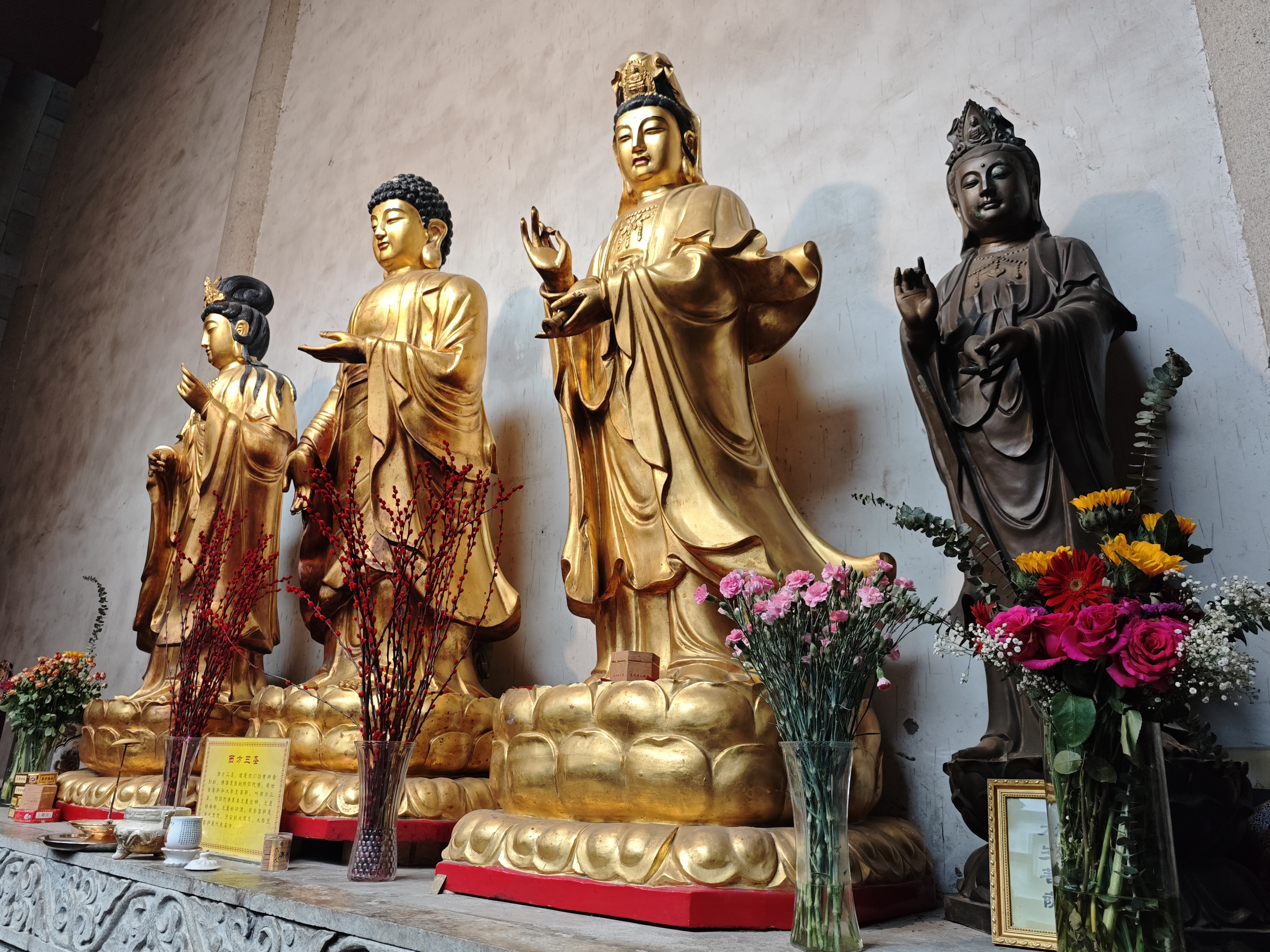
Statues of Buddha at Mahavira Hall

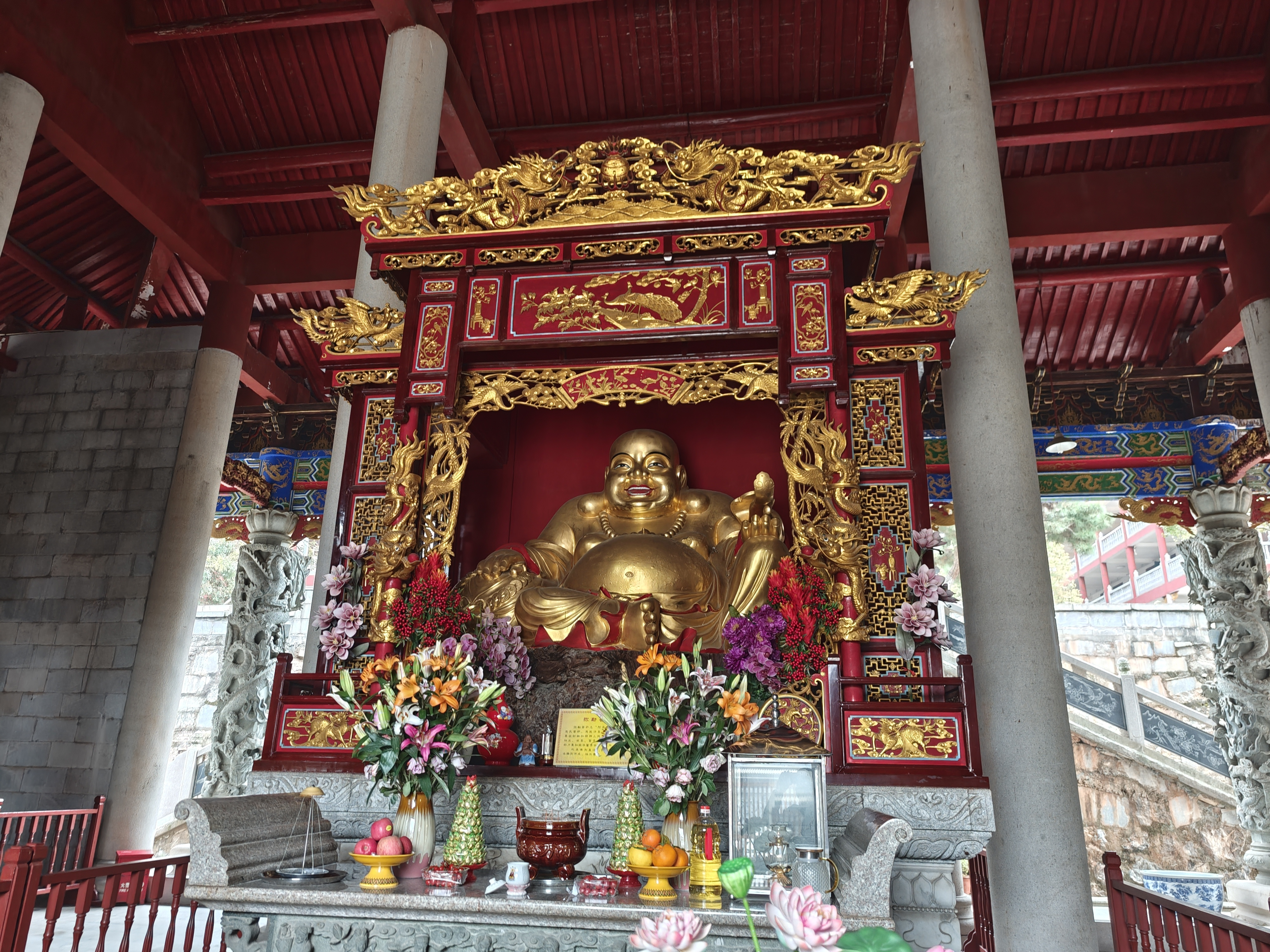
Statue of Maitreya
