= Zhuzhou Stadium =

Sports venue in Zhuzhou, China

Coordinates: 27°50′44″N 113°06′22″E

- Interactive map of Zhuzhou Stadium
- Full name: Zhuzhou Sports Center Stadium
- Location: Zhuzhou, China
- Capacity: 42,740

Zhuzhou Stadium (株洲体育中心) is a multi-purpose stadium in Zhuzhou, China. It is currently used mostly for football matches. The stadium holds 42,740 spectators.
