= Liyu Subdistrict =

Liyu Subdistrict 栗雨街道
- Subdistrict
- Location in Hunan
- Coordinates: 27.797°N 113.107°E
- Country: People's Republic of China
- Province: Hunan
- Prefecture-level city: Zhuzhou
- District: Tianyuan District
- Time zone: UTC+8 (China Standard)

Liyu Subdistrict (Chinese: 栗雨街道; pinyin: Lìyǔ Jiēdào) is a subdistrict in Tianyuan District, Zhuzhou, Hunan province, China. As of 2020, it has ten residential neighborhoods under its administration:

- Liyu
- Nantang (南塘)
- Wangjiaping (王家坪)
- Zaoshi (凿石)
- Qiantang (浅塘)
- Yuetang (月塘)
- Zhonglu (中路)
- Yong'an Community (永安社区)
- Jingyuan Community (景园社区)
- Xiangwan Community (湘湾社区)

== See also ==
- List of township-level divisions of Hunan
