= Li You =

Li You is the name of:

- Emperor Muzong of Tang (795–824), Tang dynasty emperor, known as Li You before 812
- Li You (general) (died 829), Tang dynasty general and military governor
- Li Yu, Prince of De (died 905), Tang dynasty prince, known as Li You before 897
