= Shifeng, Zhuzhou =

Shifeng 石峰区
- District
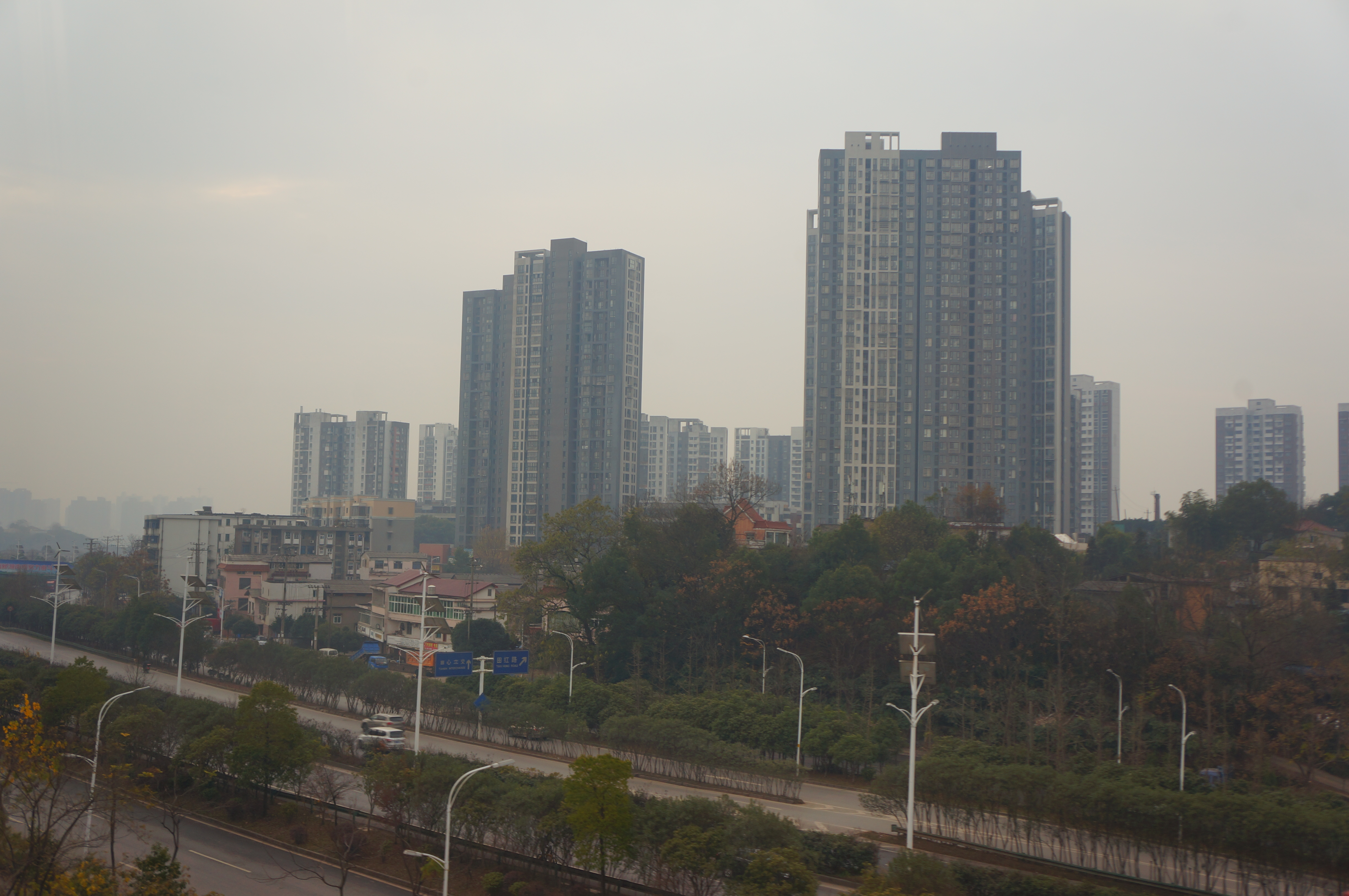

- Location in Hunan
- Coordinates (Shifeng District government): 27°52′29″N 113°07′05″E
- Country: People's Republic of China
- Province: Hunan
- Prefecture-level city: Zhuzhou
- Time zone: UTC+8 (China Standard)

Shifeng District (simplified Chinese: 石峰区; traditional Chinese: 石峰區; pinyin: Shífēng Qū; lit. 'stone peak') is one of four urban districts of Zhuzhou City, Hunan province, China. It is named after the Shifeng Park, which lies on the south of the district and the northern bank of the Xiang River.

Located in the north western region of the city proper and on the northern shoreside of the Xiang River, the district is bordered to the north by Yuhua District of Changsha and Liuyang City, to the east by Hetang and Lusong Districts, across the Xiang river to the south by Tianyuan District, and to the west by Yuetang District of Xiangtan. Shifeng District covers 191 km^{2} (74 sq mi), as of 2015, it had a permanent resident population of 323,500. The district has 6 subdistricts and a town under its jurisdiction.

== History ==
On May 31, 1997, the State Council approved (State letter [1997] No. 40): the establishment of Shifeng District, the jurisdiction of the former North District of the ringing of Shiling, Qingshuitang and the former East District of the Tianxin 3 streets, the former suburb of Longtupu Town (excluding Chayuan, Dongliu, three hitching bridge 3 villages) and Qingshui, Yuntian, Lotus 3 townships and Hetang store townships in the Xinmin, Tianxin, Shuangfeng 3 villages.

== Administrative divisions ==
After an adjustment of township-level divisions of Shifeng District on 26 November 2015, Shifeng District has 6 subdistricts and a town under its jurisdiction. They are:

6 subdistricts

- Tianxin (田心街道)
- Xiangshiling (响石岭街道)
- Qingshuitang (清水塘街道)
- Jinglong (井龙街道)
- Tongtangwan (铜塘湾街道)
- Xuelin (学林街道)

1 town

- Yuntian (云田镇)

== Economy ==
In 2016, the gross regional product of Shifeng District completed 31.18 billion yuan, an increase of 3.1% over the previous year. Among them, the added value of primary industry was 200 million yuan, an increase of 3.2%; the added value of secondary industry was 23.60 billion yuan, an increase of 2.0%, of which the added value of industry was 22.73 billion yuan, an increase of 1.9%; the added value of tertiary industry was 7.38 billion yuan, an increase of 9.7%.

== Geography ==
Shifeng District is located in the north of Zhuzhou City, Zhuzhou industrial, scientific and technological, transportation center, north of Changsha, west of Xiangtan, in the long, Zhuzhou, Tan "Golden Triangle" front.
