= Lusong, Zhuzhou =

Lusong 芦淞区
- District
- Location in Hunan
- Coordinates: 27°47′09″N 113°09′13″E
- Country: People's Republic of China
- Province: Hunan
- Prefecture-level city: Zhuzhou
- Time zone: UTC+8 (China Standard)

Lusong District (simplified Chinese: 芦淞区; traditional Chinese: 蘆淞區; pinyin: Lúsōng Qū) is one of four urban districts of Zhuzhou City, Hunan province, China. The district was formed on May 31, 1997. It is named after its seat located near the place of Lusong Road.

Located in the south eastern region of the city proper and on the northeastern shoreside of the Xiang River, the district is bordered to the north by Shifeng, Hetang districts and Liuyang City, to the east by Liling City, to the south by Zhuzhou County, and across the Xiang river to the west by Tianyuan District. Lusong District covers an area of 216.8 km^{2} (83.7 sq mi), and as of 2015, it had a permanent resident population of 299,100. The district has 7 subdistricts and a town under its jurisdiction.

== Administrative divisions ==
After an adjustment of the divisions of Lusong District on 26 November 2015, Lusong District has 7 subdistricts and a town under its jurisdiction. They are:

7 subdistricts

- Hejiatu (贺家土街道)
- Jianshe (建设街道)
- Jianning (建宁街道)
- Qingyun (庆云街道)
- Fengxi (枫溪街道)
- Longquan (龙泉街道)
- Dongjiaduan (董家塅街道)

1 town

- Baiguan (白关镇)
