= Zhuzhou =

City in Hunan, China

Zhuzhou 株洲市 Chuchow
- Prefecture-level city
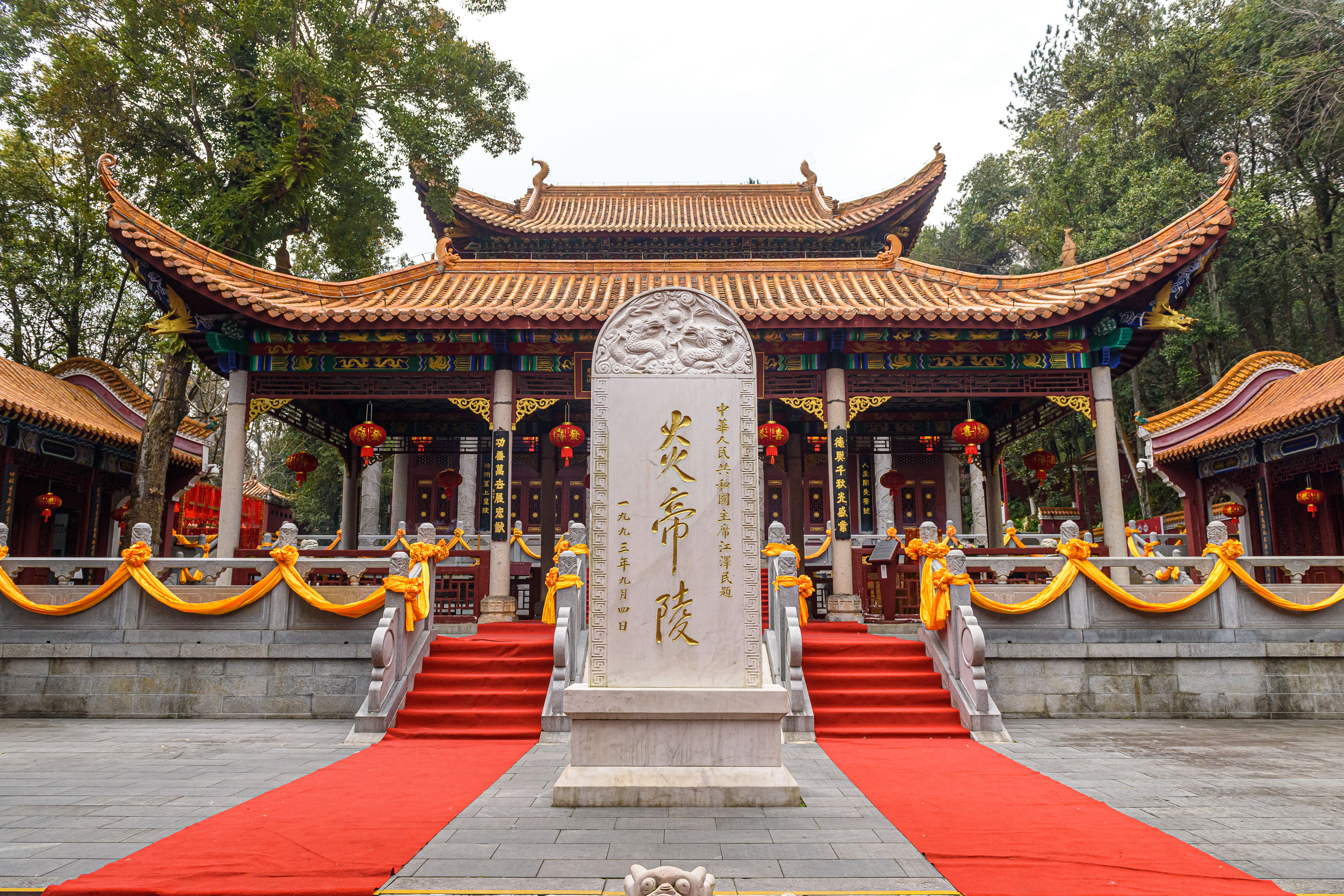
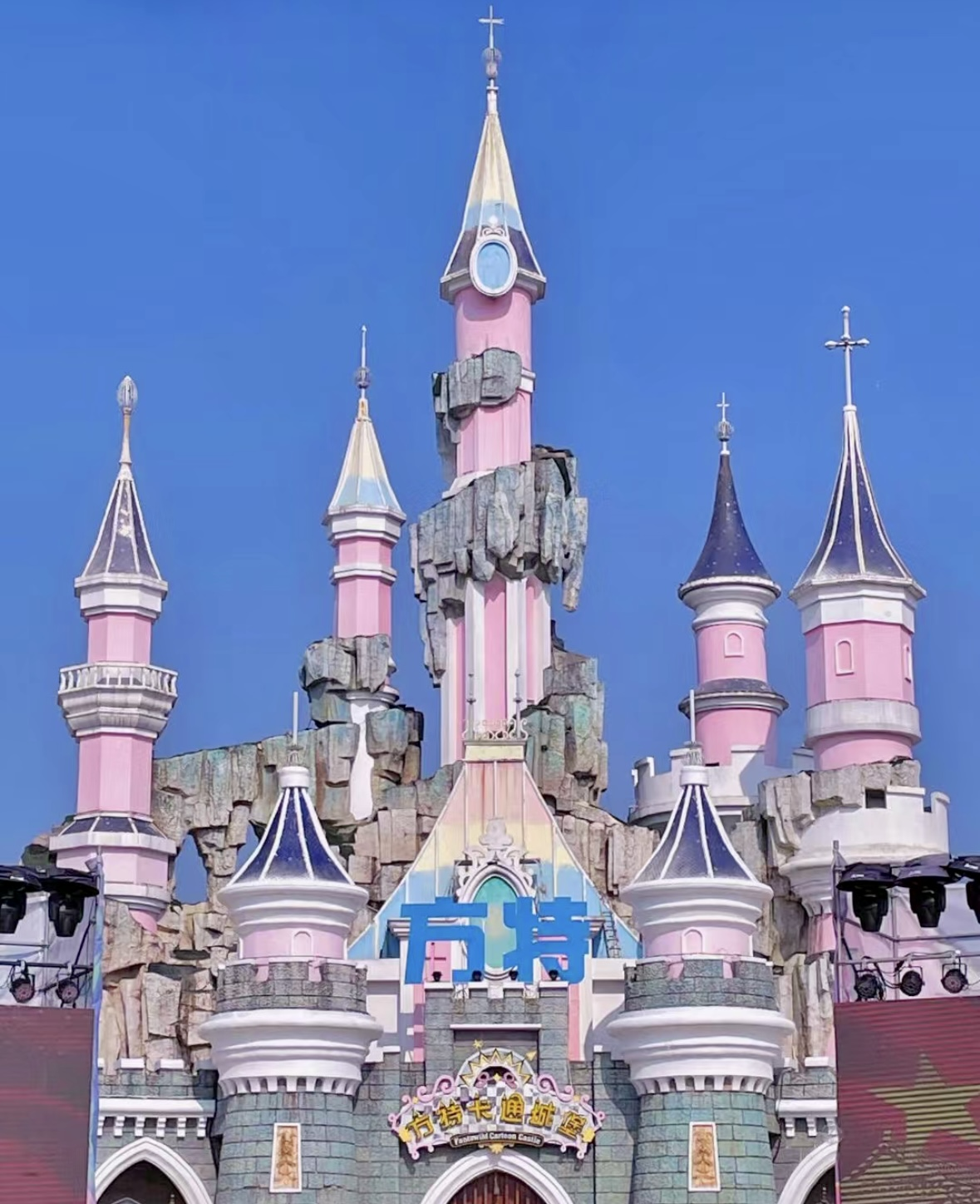
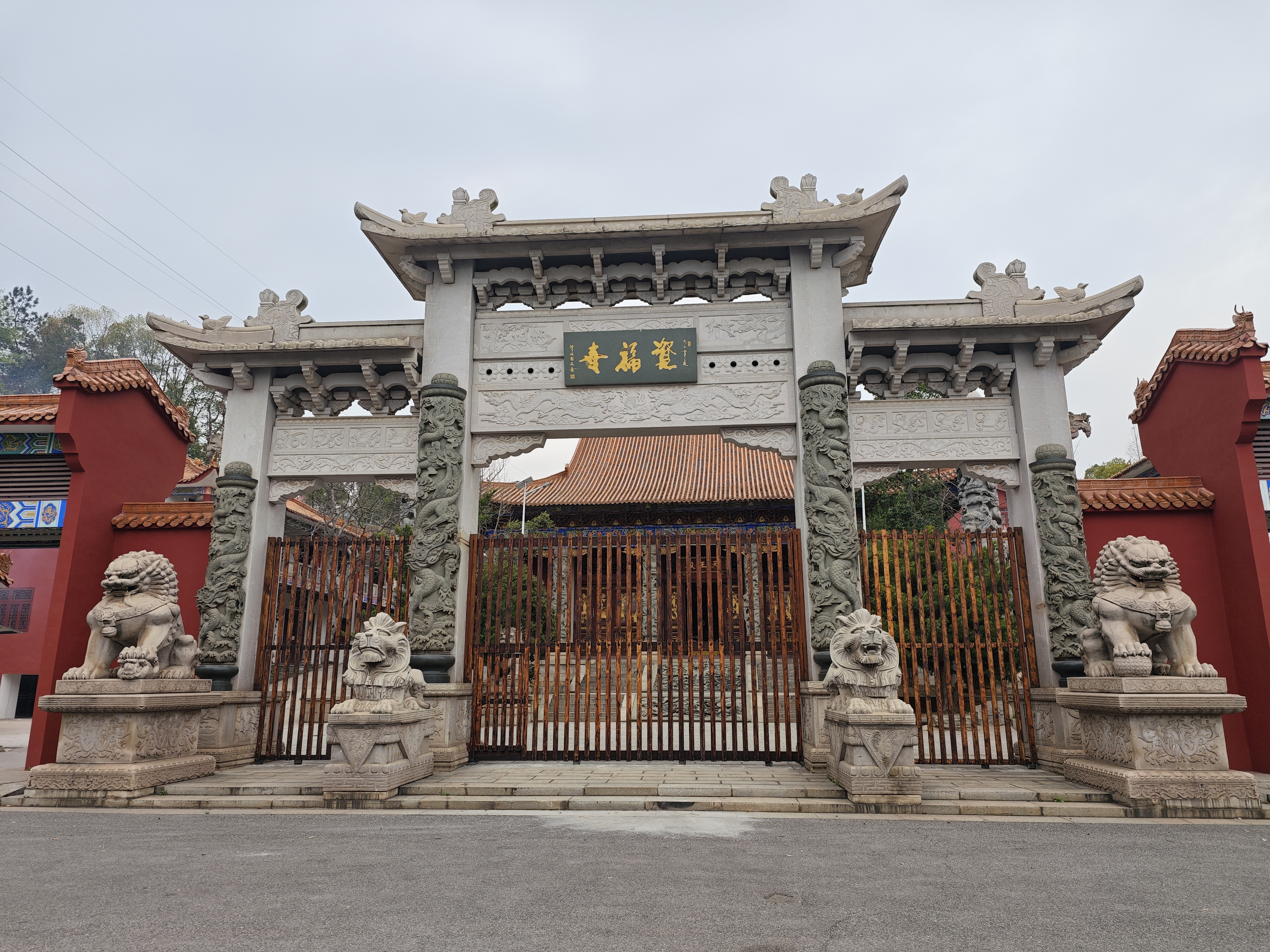
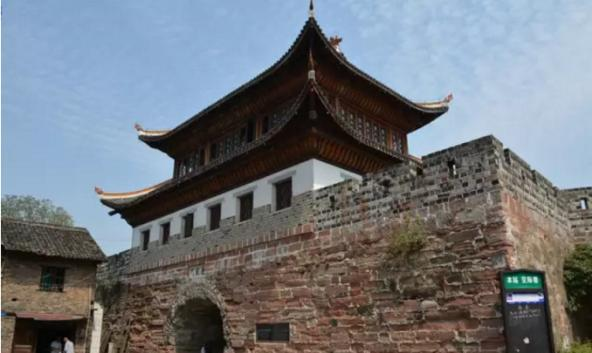
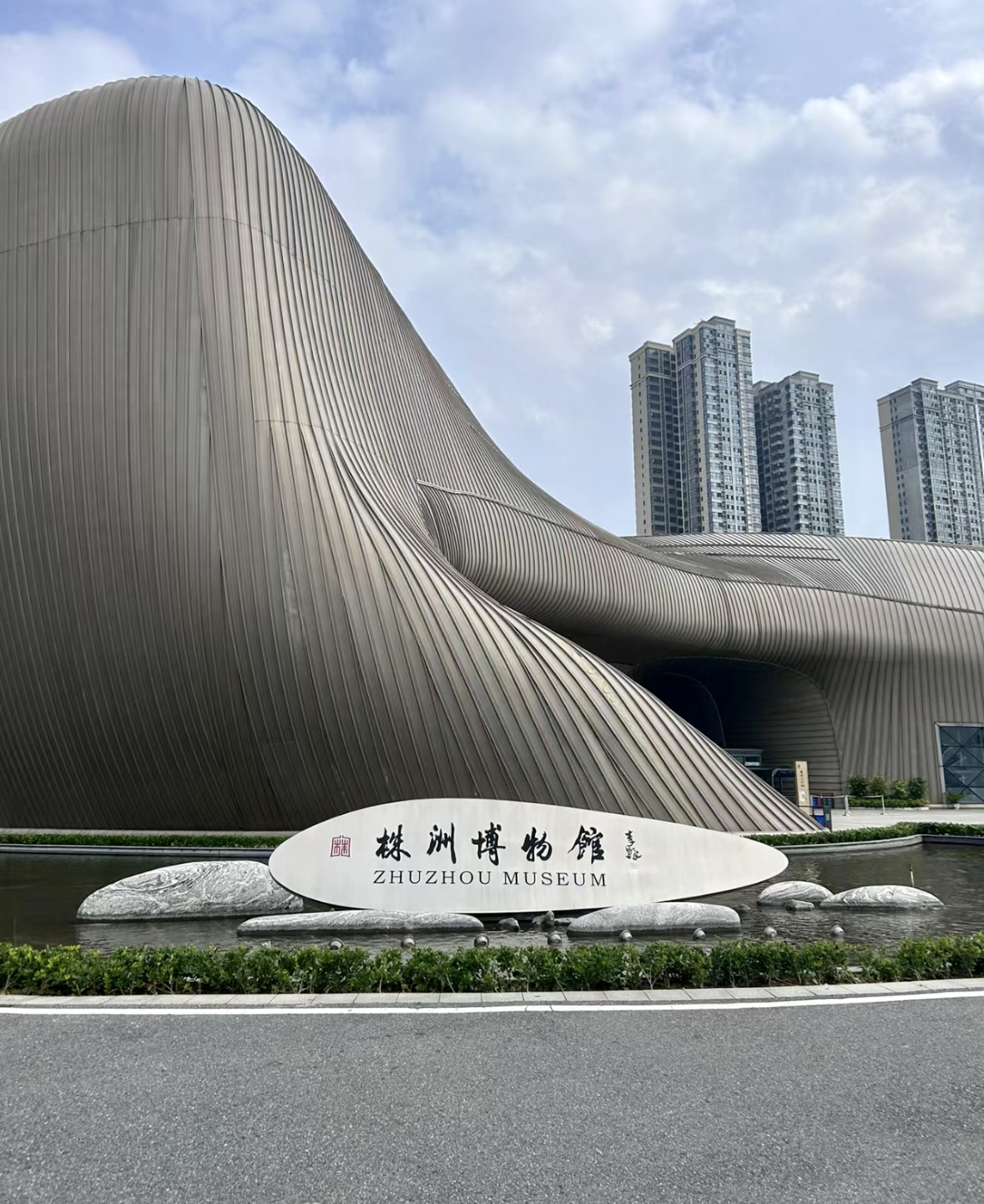
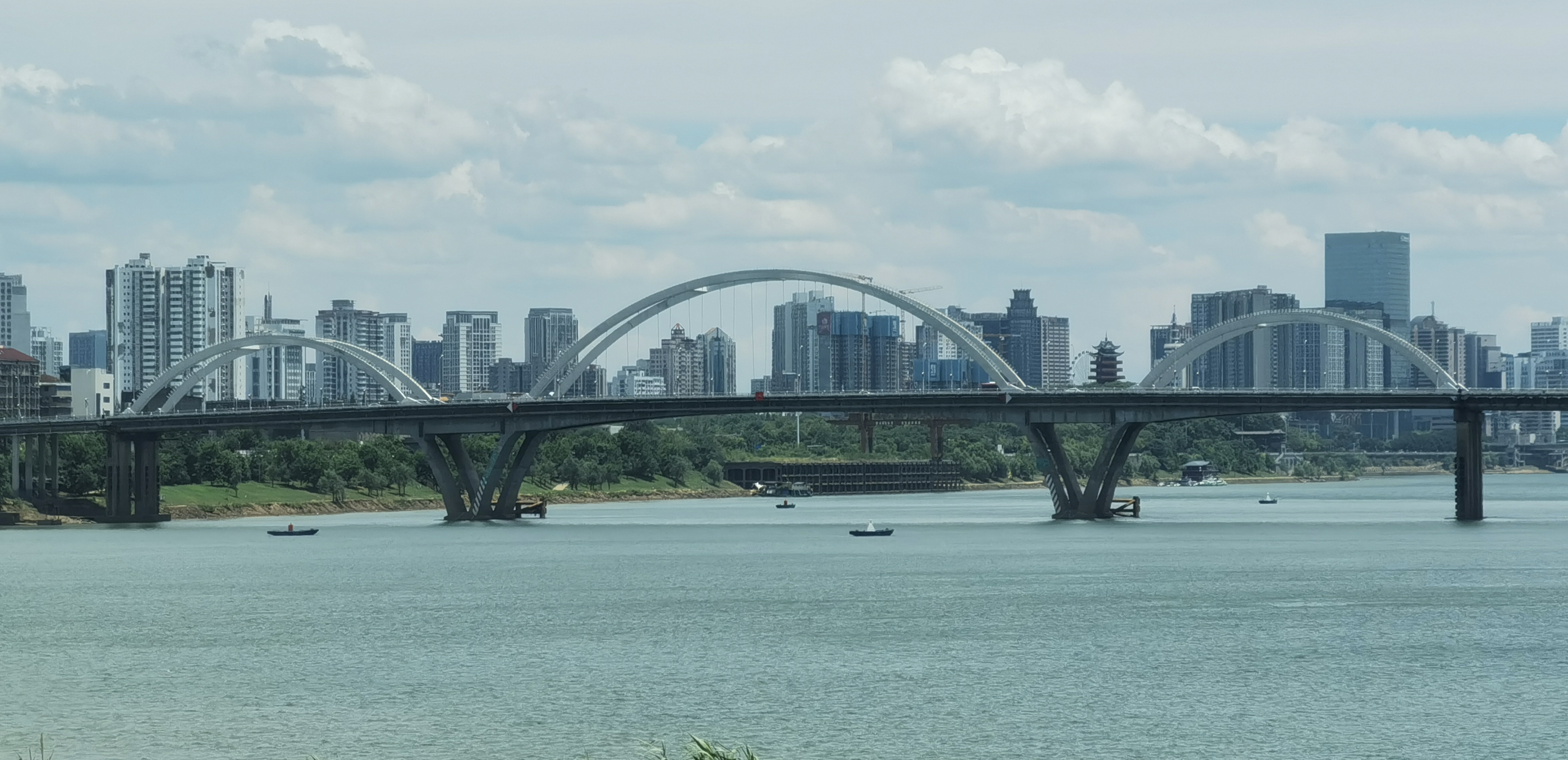
- Mausoleum of Yan Emperor Zhuzhou Fangte Zifu Temple City Wall of Chaling Zhuzhou Museum City View

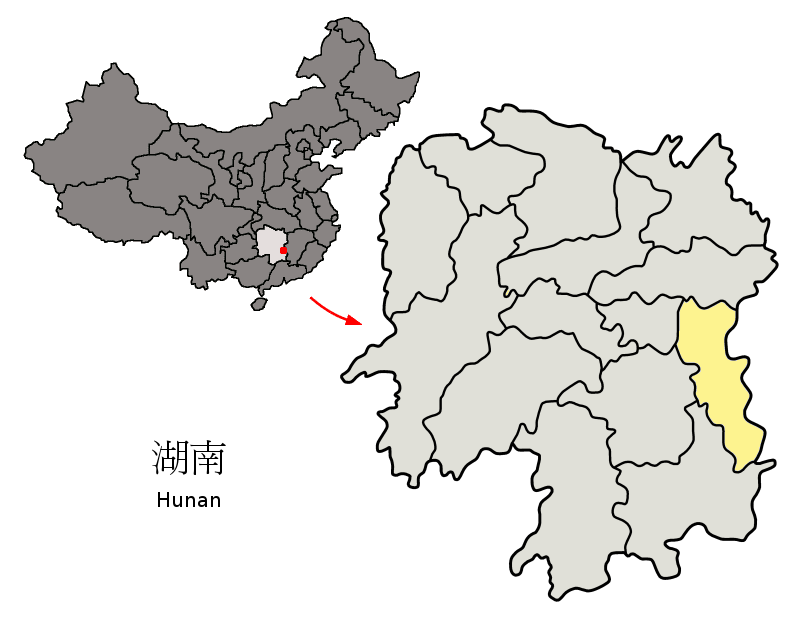
- Location of Zhuzhou City jurisdiction in Hunan

- Location of the city centre in Hunan
- Coordinates (Zhuzhou municipal government): 27°49′44″N 113°07′59″E
- Country: People's Republic of China
- Province: Hunan
- Municipal seat: Tianyuan District

Government
  - Mayor: Mao Tengfei

Area
  - Prefecture-level city: 11,262 km^{2} (4,348 sq mi)
  - Urban (2017): 862.69 km^{2} (333.09 sq mi)

Population (2010 census)
  - Prefecture-level city: 3,855,609
  - Density: 342.36/km^{2} (886.70/sq mi)
  - Urban (2017): 1,145,100

GDP
  - Prefecture-level city: CN¥ 361.7 billion US$ 53.6 billion
  - Per capita: CN¥93,431; US$13,893
- Time zone: UTC+8 (China Standard)
- ISO 3166 code: CN-HN-02

Zhuzhou
- Chinese: 株洲
- Literal meaning: Stump Island
Transcriptions
Standard Mandarin
- Hanyu Pinyin: Zhūzhōu
- Wade–Giles: Chu^{1}-chou^{1}
- IPA: [ʈʂú.ʈʂóʊ]

Zhuzhou (Chinese: 株洲; pinyin: Zhūzhōu, joo-joh), formerly Jianning (建宁), is a prefecture-level city of Hunan Province, China, straddling the Xiang River southeast of the provincial capital, Changsha, and bordering Jiangxi province to the east. It is part of the "Greater Changsha Metropolitan Region, also known as Changzhutan Golden Triangle" (comprising the cities of Changsha, Zhuzhou and Xiangtan). The city has jurisdiction over five counties (Yanling, Chaling, Youxian, Liling, Zhuzhou) and four districts (Hetang, Lusong, Shifeng and Tianyuan, a high-tech industrial development zone), and covers an area of 11,420 km^{2} (4,410 sq mi).

As of the 2022 census, Zhuzhou had 3,871,100 inhabitants, of whom 1,055,373 lived in the built-up area (4 urban districts). With Xiangtan areas adjoining Zhuzhou due to be agglomerated in a few years' time, the joint built-up area will be home to 2,933,069 inhabitants. Zhuzhou is located in a subtropical monsoon climate zone and with its abundant mineral and organic resources has one of the highest agricultural yields in Hunan province. Zhuzhou is home to a provincial public university of Hunan University of Technology.

Zhuzhou is a key center for Xiang Opera (湘剧) and home to the traditional Xiangxiu Fire Dragon Dance (湘西火龙), performed during the Lantern Festival.

== Geography ==
Zhuzhou has a humid subtropical climate with long, hot summers, and cool to cold, cloudy, damp winters with occasional snow flurries. Within its administrative area, the annual mean temperature is 17.7 °C (63.9 °F), with the coolest month being January, which averages 5.3 °C (41.5 °F), and the hottest July, at 29.5 °C (85.1 °F).

Climate data for Zhuzhou, elevation 75 m (246 ft), (1991–2020 normals, extremes 1981–present)
| Month | Jan | Feb | Mar | Apr | May | Jun | Jul | Aug | Sep | Oct | Nov | Dec | Year |
|---|---|---|---|---|---|---|---|---|---|---|---|---|---|
| Record high °C (°F) | 24.1 (75.4) | 30.9 (87.6) | 33.5 (92.3) | 35.8 (96.4) | 36.5 (97.7) | 38.0 (100.4) | 39.6 (103.3) | 40.3 (104.5) | 37.8 (100.0) | 35.1 (95.2) | 32.1 (89.8) | 25.0 (77.0) | 40.3 (104.5) |
| Mean daily maximum °C (°F) | 8.8 (47.8) | 11.2 (52.2) | 15.4 (59.7) | 22.2 (72.0) | 27.2 (81.0) | 30.4 (86.7) | 34.0 (93.2) | 33.2 (91.8) | 28.9 (84.0) | 23.6 (74.5) | 17.9 (64.2) | 12.0 (53.6) | 22.1 (71.7) |
| Daily mean °C (°F) | 5.3 (41.5) | 7.5 (45.5) | 11.4 (52.5) | 17.7 (63.9) | 22.6 (72.7) | 26.1 (79.0) | 29.5 (85.1) | 28.5 (83.3) | 24.3 (75.7) | 18.9 (66.0) | 13.2 (55.8) | 7.5 (45.5) | 17.7 (63.9) |
| Mean daily minimum °C (°F) | 2.6 (36.7) | 4.9 (40.8) | 8.4 (47.1) | 14.2 (57.6) | 18.9 (66.0) | 22.6 (72.7) | 25.8 (78.4) | 24.9 (76.8) | 20.8 (69.4) | 15.4 (59.7) | 9.6 (49.3) | 4.2 (39.6) | 14.4 (57.8) |
| Record low °C (°F) | −5.7 (21.7) | −7.9 (17.8) | −0.9 (30.4) | 2.5 (36.5) | 9.8 (49.6) | 13.1 (55.6) | 18.6 (65.5) | 16.9 (62.4) | 12.7 (54.9) | 3.2 (37.8) | −1.1 (30.0) | −11.5 (11.3) | −11.5 (11.3) |
| Average precipitation mm (inches) | 76.4 (3.01) | 102.6 (4.04) | 150.2 (5.91) | 186.1 (7.33) | 188.9 (7.44) | 209.8 (8.26) | 125.7 (4.95) | 124.3 (4.89) | 73.9 (2.91) | 79.9 (3.15) | 76.4 (3.01) | 51.3 (2.02) | 1,445.5 (56.92) |
| Average precipitation days (≥ 0.1 mm) | 14.3 | 13.9 | 17.9 | 17.4 | 16.2 | 15.5 | 10.6 | 11.3 | 9.1 | 9.3 | 10.7 | 11.3 | 157.5 |
| Average snowy days | 3.6 | 2.1 | 0.5 | 0 | 0 | 0 | 0 | 0 | 0 | 0 | 0.1 | 1.4 | 7.7 |
| Average relative humidity (%) | 81 | 81 | 81 | 79 | 78 | 79 | 72 | 76 | 78 | 77 | 76 | 77 | 78 |
| Mean monthly sunshine hours | 59.6 | 64.6 | 78.2 | 109.0 | 137.6 | 142.4 | 230.4 | 206.2 | 157.2 | 134.6 | 113.3 | 97.9 | 1,531 |
| Percentage possible sunshine | 18 | 20 | 21 | 28 | 33 | 34 | 54 | 51 | 43 | 38 | 35 | 31 | 34 |
Source: China Meteorological Administration All-time Dec high

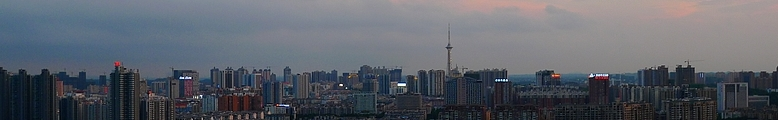
Panoramic view of Zhuzhou

== Administrative divisions ==
Zhuzhou city administers five districts, one county-level city and three counties.

- Tianyuan District (天元区)
- Hetang District (荷塘区)
- Lusong District (芦淞区)
- Shifeng District (石峰区)
- Lukou District (渌口区)
- Liling City (醴陵市)
- You County (攸县)
- Chaling County (茶陵县)
- Yanling County (炎陵县)

Zhuzhou has also established the following administrative areas:

- CNHTIDZ Zhuzhou High-Tech Industrial Development Zone (Governed with Tianyuan District under "One institution with two names")

Map
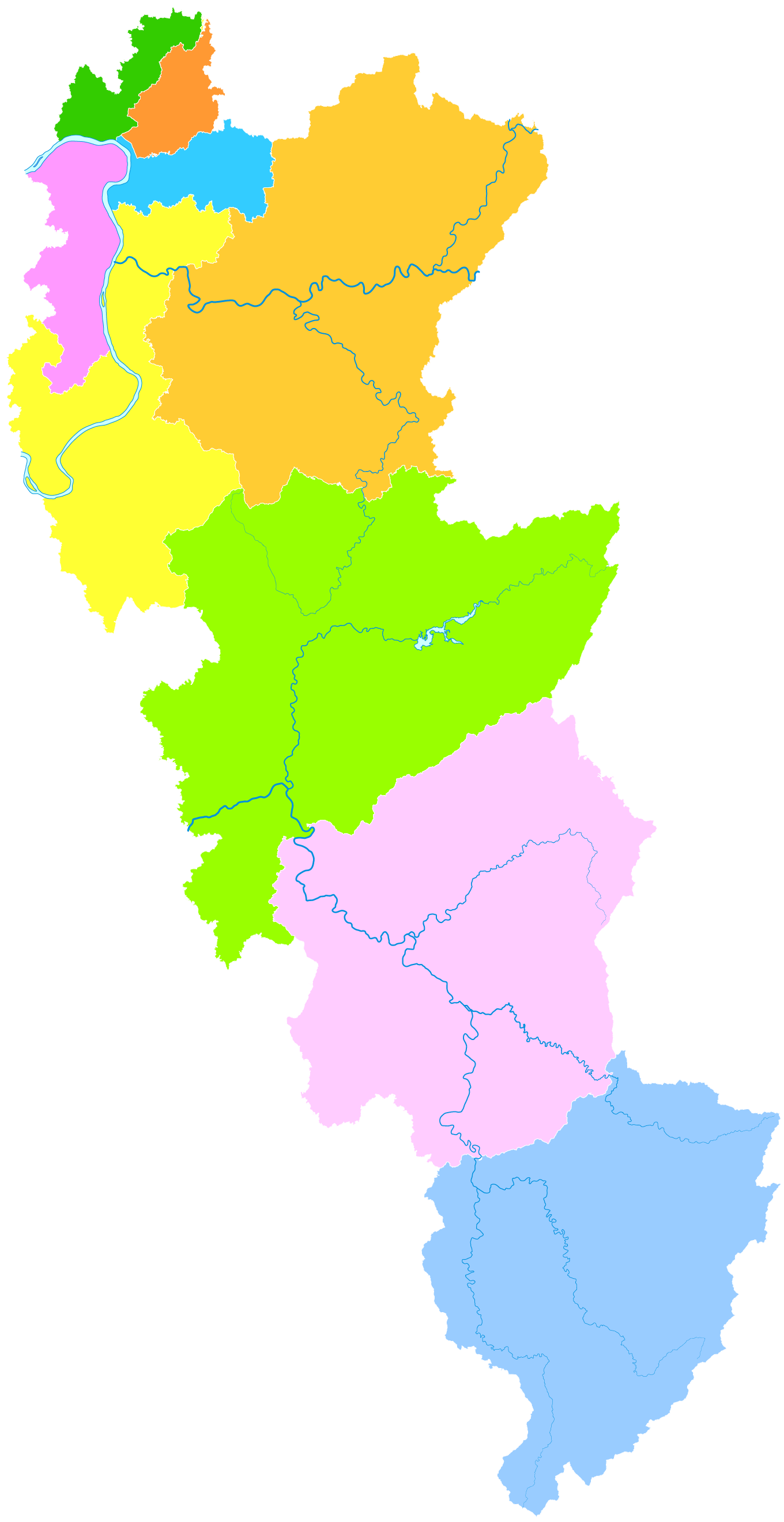

== Government ==
The government of Zhuzhou has a structured in a dual party-government system like all other governing institutions in mainland China.

The mayor of Zhuzhou is the highest-ranking official in the People's Government of Zhuzhou or Zhuzhou Municipal Government. However, in the city's dual party-government governing system, the mayor has less power than the Communist Party of Zhuzhou Municipal Committee Secretary, colloquially termed the "CPC Party Chief of Zhuzhou" or "Communist Party Secretary of Zhuzhou".

Wu Zhankui served 16 years as the 3rd, 5th and 10th mayor of Zhuzhou from 1953 to 1955, 1956 to 1968, and 1980 to 1983. He is the longest term mayor of Zhuzhou.

List of mayors of Zhuzhou
| No. | English name | Chinese name | Took office | Left office |
|---|---|---|---|---|
| 1 | Yang Dipu | 杨第莆 | April 1951 | July 1951 |
| 2 | Chen Jichang | 陈继昌 | July 1951 | April 1953 |
| 3 | Wu Zhankui | 吴占魁 | April 1953 | May 1955 |
| 4 | Ma Zhuangkun | 马壮昆 | May 1955 | July 1956 |
| 5 | Wu Zhankui | 吴占魁 | July 1956 | January 1968 |
| 7 | Wang Daju | 王大举 | January 1968 | October 1968 |
| 8 | Gao Jitang | 高继唐 | October 1968 | November 1977 |
| 9 | Zhou Zheng | 周政 | November 1977 | June 1980 |
| 10 | Wu Zhankui | 吴占魁 | December 1980 | May 1983 |
| 11 | Xue Houmin | 薛厚民 | October 1983 | December 1984 |
| 12 | Zhou Jitai | 周吉太 | May 1985 | July 1990 |
| 13 | Zhou Bohua | 周伯华 | July 1990 | January 1993 |
| 14 | Wang Tingming | 王汀明 | January 1993 | April 2000 |
| 15 | Xiao Yayu | 肖雅瑜 | April 2000 | April 2003 |
| 16 | Yan Shisheng | 颜石生 | April 2003 | April 2007 |
| 17 | Chen Junwen | 陈君文 | April 2007 | April 2008 |
| 18 | Chen Junwen | 陈君文 | January 2008 | April 2008 |
| 19 | Wang Qun | 王群 | May 2008 | January 2009 |
| 20 | Wang Qun | 王群 | January 2009 | March 2013 |
| 21 | Mao Tengfei | 毛腾飞 | May 2013 | March 2016 |
| 22 | Yang Weiguo | 阳卫国 | May 2016 | July 2021 |
| 23 | Chen Huiqing | 陈恢清 | August 2021 | - |

List of CPC Party Secretaries of Zhuzhou
| No. | English name | Chinese name | Took office | Left office |
|---|---|---|---|---|
| 1 | Yang Dipu | 杨第莆 | April 1951 | July 1951 |
| 2 | Chen Jichang | 陈继昌 | July 1951 | November 1952 |
| 3 | Hou Xiyi | 侯锡义 | December 1952 | June 1954 |
| 4 | Wang Zhiguo | 王治国 | June 1954 | September 1954 |
| 5 | Ma Zhuangkun | 马壮昆 | September 1954 | December 1967 |
| 6 | Gao Jitang | 高继唐 | October 1968 | November 1977 |
| 7 | Zhou Zheng | 周政 | November 1977 | May 1980 |
| 8 | Zhu Yuanming | 朱远明 | May 1980 | February 1982 |
| 9 | Li Zhaomin | 李照民 | February 1982 | May 1983 |
| 10 | Sun Wensheng | 孙文盛 | May 1983 | July 1984 |
| 11 | Cao Bochun | 曹伯纯 | July 1984 | May 1990 |
| 12 | Zhou Jitai | 周吉太 | June 1990 | January 1994 |
| 13 | Cheng Xinghan | 程兴汉 | February 1994 | April 2000 |
| 14 | Wang Tingming | 王汀明 | April 2000 | March 2003 |
| 15 | Xiao Yayu | 肖雅瑜 | March 2003 | March 2008 |
| 16 | Chen Junwen | 陈君文 | March 2008 | April 2013 |
| 17 | He Anjie | 贺安杰 | April 2013 | March 2016 |
| 18 | Mao Tengfei | 毛腾飞 | March 2016 | April 2021 |
| 19 | Cao Huiquan | 曹慧泉 | April 2021 | – |

== Transportation ==
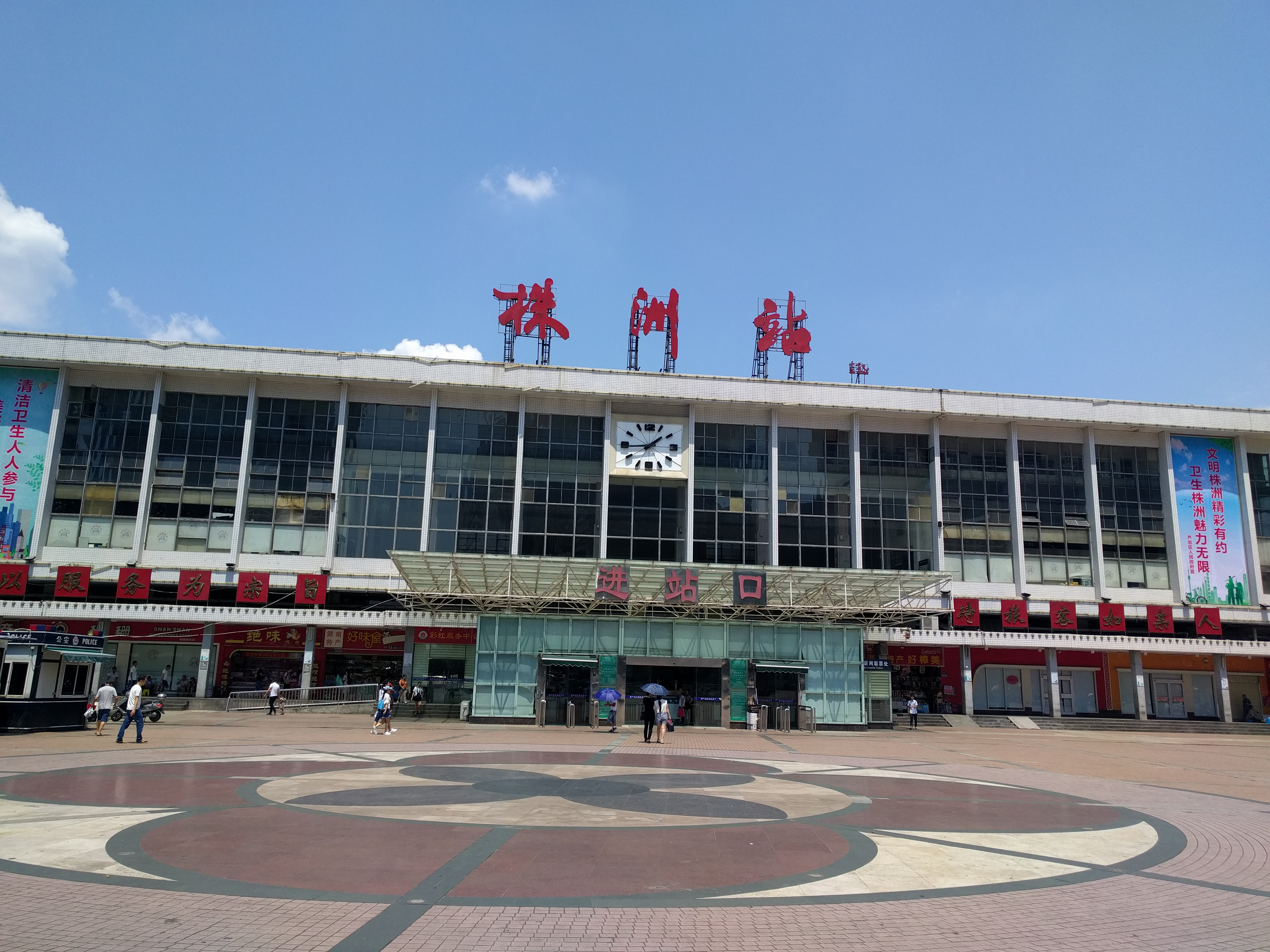
Zhuzhou Railway Station in July 2017

Zhuzhou is a very important transportation junction in South China. The Beijing–Guangzhou railway and the Shanghai–Kunming railway meet here, which makes Zhuzhou railway station, conveniently located in downtown Zhuzhou, one of the five special class passenger-and-goods transportation stations in China. On average, a train passes through every three minutes. Zhuzhou North Station is the largest goods transportation marshalling station in South China, with 110 trains and more than 30,000 passengers passing through every day.

The Beijing–Guangzhou high-speed railway serves the city as well. As almost everywhere along this line, the high-speed railway is routed away from the city core. High-speed trains to Guangzhou, Wuhan, Beijing, Xi'an and points in between stop at Zhuzhou West railway station, which is located about 10 kilometres (6.2 miles) to the west of downtown Zhuzhou.

As well through its comprehensive railway system, Zhuzhou is connected to the rest of the country by 106 National Highway, 320 National Highway, 211 Provincial Highway, the Beijing–Zhuhai expressway, the Shanghai–Ruili expressway, and three highways linking south Fujian, south Jiangxi and south Hunan Province.

Zhuzhou is 37 kilometres (23 miles) away from Changsha Huanghua International Airport. It takes about 30 minutes to drive to the airport by the Changsha–Zhuzhou Highway.

The Xiang River (Xiangjiang) flows through Zhuzhou, which makes it one of the eight river ports of Hunan Province.

Phase 1 of the world's first Autonomous Rapid Transit (ART) system, opened in 2018 and was later extended. The system uses 300 passenger rubber tyred vehicles capable of both following markings on the roadway and being steered by a driver. It is commonly called either a "guided bus" and a "trackless tram". The system was developed by the CRRC Zhuzhou Electric Locomotive Research Institute.

A study based on the Zhuzhou Autonomous Rail Rapid Transit demonstration line analyzed the characteristics and feasibility of the intelligent rail express system.

| Line | System | Locale | Length | Stations | Opened |
|---|---|---|---|---|---|
| Line A1 Chinese: 智能轨道快运A1线 | Zhuzhou ART | Zhuzhou | 3.6 km (2.2 mi) | 4 | 2018-05-18 |
| Line A2 Chinese: 智能轨道快运A2线 | Zhuzhou ART | Zhuzhou | 7.1 km (4.4 mi) | 7 + 1 (temporary) | 2021-03-30 |

== Industry ==
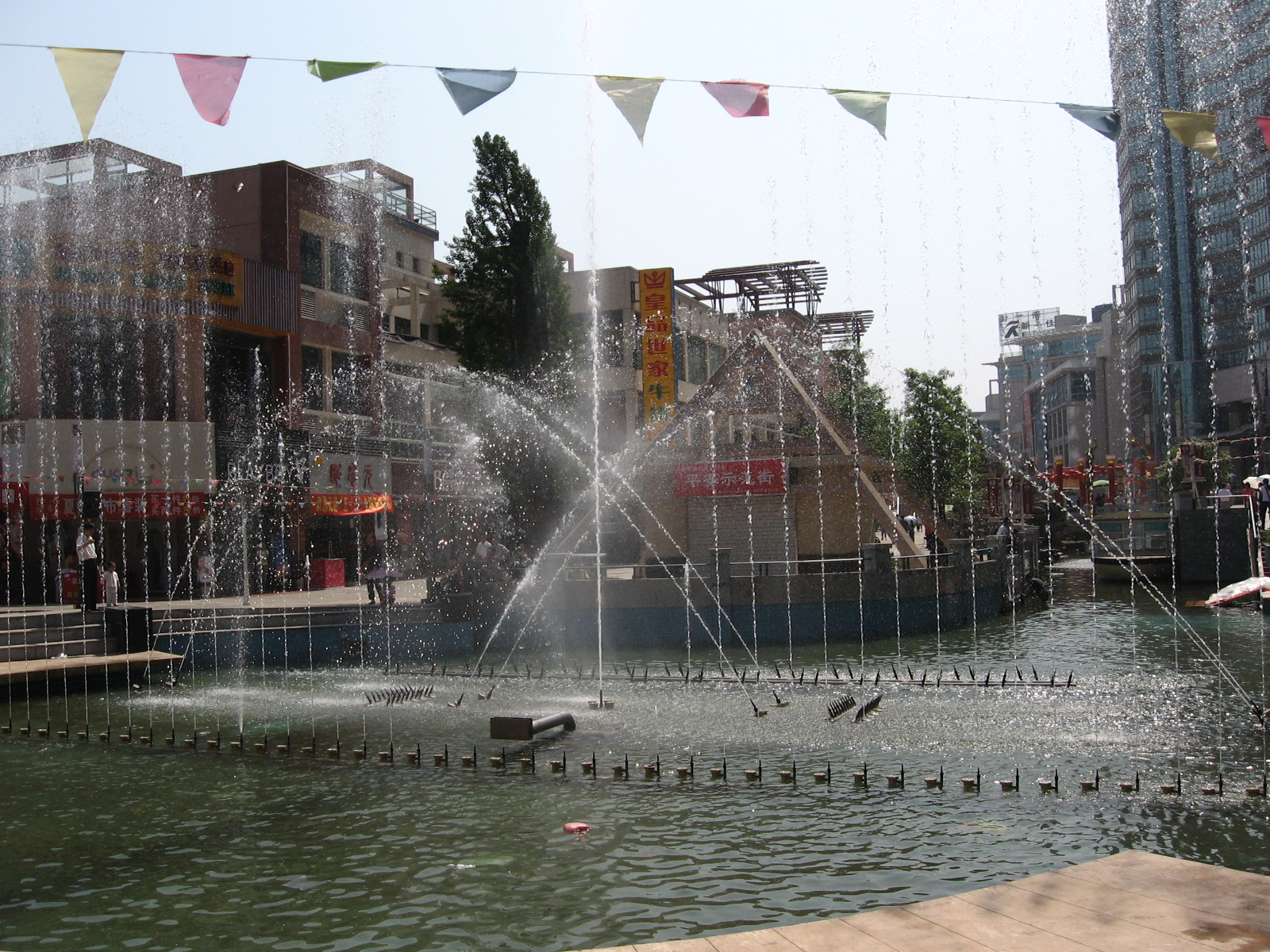
Xujiaqiao Pedestrian Street

Zhuzhou is the second largest city in Hunan Province; it is an industrial city with four key industries are metallurgy, machine manufacture, chemicals and building materials, respectively.

Zhuzhou became one of the eight key national-wide industrial cities in the 1st Five-Year-Plan. four out of 156 key projects were set up in Zhuzhou. Later on, more than 20 important factories were built in Zhuzhou.

Zhuzhou's high-tech industrial development zone was approved by the State Council in December 1992 and was designated in a 35 km^{2} (14 sq mi) area next to the Xiang River.

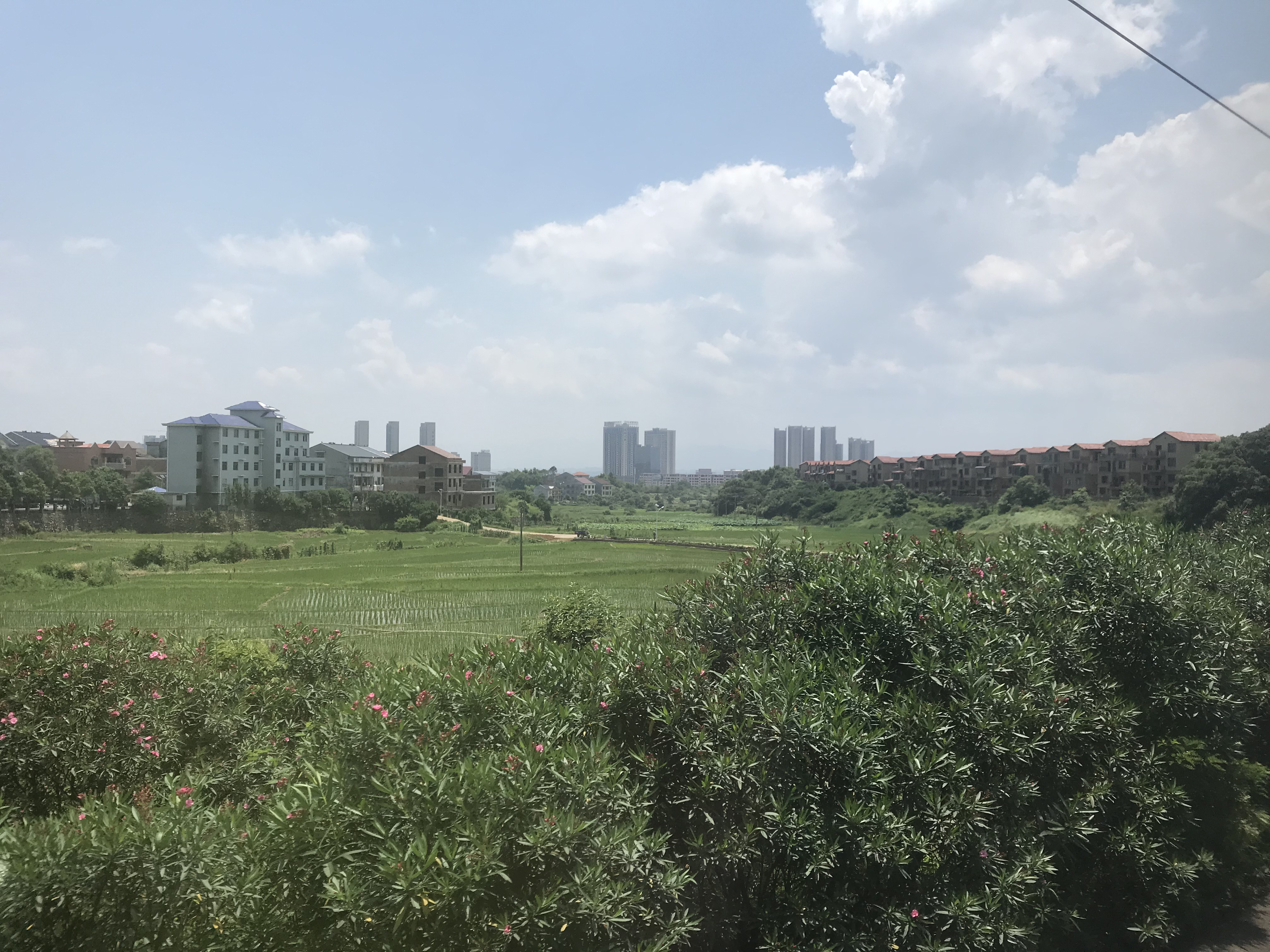
Chaling County

The high-tech industrial development zone is located less than 10 km (6.2 mi) from China National Highway 320, and provides incentives to encourage investment in biotechnology and pharmaceuticals; construction materials production, food and agricultural processing, heavy industry, and telecommunications equipment production.

== Colleges and universities ==
This is a list of institutions with full-time bachelor programs in Zhuzhou:

- Hunan University of Technology (湖南工业大学)

== Building and structures ==
- Zhuzhou Television Tower
- Zhuzhou Stadium

== International relations ==
=== Twin towns – sister cities ===
Zhuzhou is twinned with:

- Vanadzor, Armenia
- Sumgait, Azerbaijan
- Fredrikstad, Østfold, Norway and Zhuzhou signed a twin town agreement in 1999 after establishing contact in 1995. The two cities also signed agreements on student and competence exchange and culture. Also, two elementary schools—one in Zhuzhou and one in Fredrikstad—signed an agreement on friendship cooperation.
- Durham, North Carolina, United States
- Southern Pines, North Carolina, United States; The O'Neal School in Southern Pines, North Carolina has partnered and developed an exchange program with Nanfang High School and Zhuzhou Foreign Language School.
- City of Pietermaritzburg, South Africa

== See also ==
- Southern Hunan uprising (湘南起义), communist lead anti-Nationalist insurgency in today Zhuzhou
- Tomb of Yan emperor, Yan emperor was one of legendary Chinese rulers died and buried in Zhuzhou
