= Tianyuan, Zhuzhou =

Tianyuan 天元区
- District
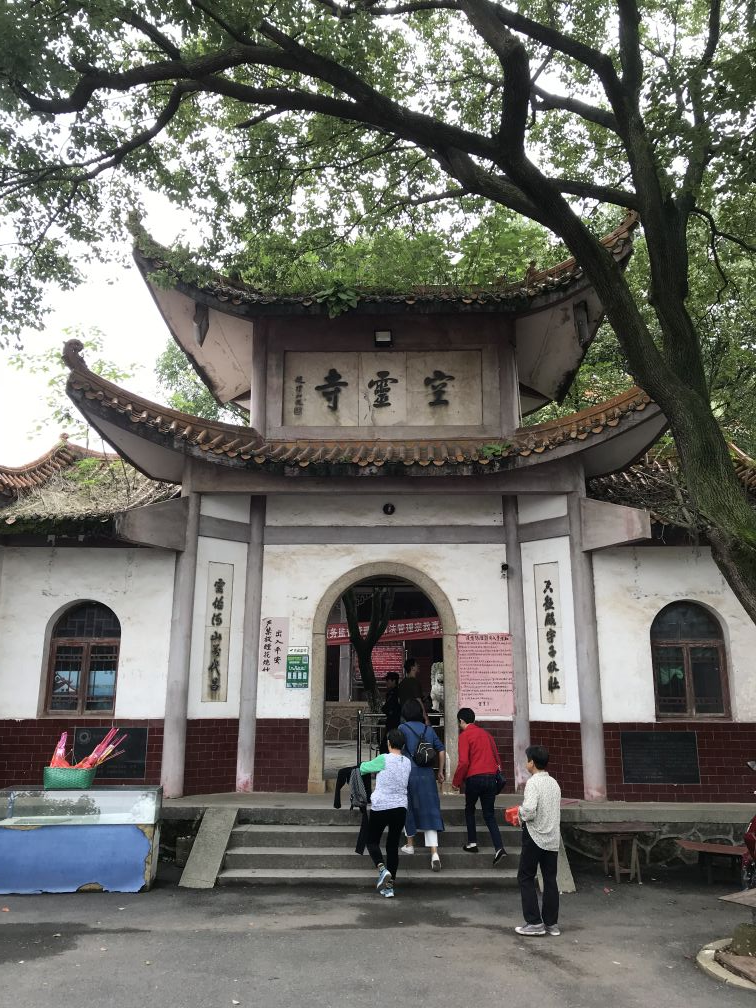

- Location in Hunan
- Coordinates: 27°49′37″N 113°04′56″E
- Country: People's Republic of China
- Province: Hunan
- Prefecture-level city: Zhuzhou
- Seat: Liyu Subdistrict
- Time zone: UTC+8 (China Standard)

Tianyuan District (Chinese: 天元区; pinyin: Tiānyuán Qū) is one of four urban districts of Zhuzhou City, Hunan province, China. The district was formed on May 31, 1997. Its name derives from Tian-tai Mountain (天台山) and Yuan-yi Farm (园艺场), which were two important places then, taking their first syllables, creating the name of Tianyuan District.

Located in the south western region of the city proper and on the southwestern shoreside of the Xiang River, the district is bordered across the Xiang river to the north by Yuetang District of Xiangtang and Shifeng District, to the northeast by Hetang and Lusong Districts, to the southeast and the south by Zhuzhou County, and to the west by Xiangtan County. Tianyuan District covers an area of 328 km^{2} (127 sq mi), and as of 2015, it had a permanent resident population of 292,500. The district has 3 subdistricts and 3 towns under its jurisdiction. the government seat is at Liyu Subdistrict (栗雨街道).

Despite the name coincidence, this District is not the place for the Tianyuan Cave, where the Tianyuan man was found.

== Administrative divisions ==
According to the result on adjustment of subdistrict divisions of Tianyuan District on November 26, 2015, Tianyuan District has 3 subdistricts and 3 towns under its jurisdiction. They are:

3 subdistricts

- Liyu (栗雨街道)
- Songshanlu (嵩山路街道)
- Taishanlu (泰山路街道)

3 towns

- Leidashi (雷打石镇)
- Qunfeng (群丰镇)
- Sanmen (三门镇)
