= G0422 Wuhan–Shenzhen Expressway =

Expressway in China

Wuhan–Shenzhen Expressway
- 武汉－深圳高速公路
- Wushen Expressway 武深高速公路

Major junctions
- North end: Wuhan, Hubei
- South end: Shenzhen, Guangdong

Location
- Country: China

Highway system
- National Trunk Highway System; Primary; Auxiliary; National Highways; Transport in China
← G0421	→ G0423

The Wuhan–Shenzhen Expressway (simplified Chinese: 武汉－深圳高速公路; traditional Chinese: 武漢－深圳高速公路), officially designated as G0422 and commonly abbreviated as Wushen Expressway (Chinese: 武深高速), serves as an expressway in Central South China, connecting the cities of Wuhan, Hubei and Shenzhen, Guangdong.

== Route ==
G0422 Wushen Expressway in Hubei Province

North to South
Under Construction
	G4 Jinggang'ao Expressway
	Towards Jiangxia
	S214 Road; Towards Chibi
	G4 Jinggang'ao Expressway
	G107 Road; Cha'anling
	G56 Hangrui Expressway
Service Area
Hubei Province; Hunan Province
Currently named S11 Pingru Expressway	Under Construction
Currently named S11 Pingru Expressway	G106 Road; Dongta
Currently named S11 Pingru Expressway	Nanyang Service Area
Currently named S11 Pingru Expressway	G106 Road; Nanjiang
Currently named S11 Pingru Expressway	G106 Road; Meixian
Currently named S11 Pingru Expressway	Baihuatai Ave; Towards G106 Road; Pingjiang
Currently named S11 Pingru Expressway	Anding Service Area
Currently named S11 Pingru Expressway	Towards G106 Road; Anding
Currently named S11 Pingru Expressway	G106 Road; Towards Longfu-Shegang
Currently named S11 Pingru Expressway	X013 Road; Shashi
Currently named S11 Pingru Expressway	Beisheng
Currently named S11 Pingru Expressway	S20 Zhangliu Expressway
Currently named S11 Pingru Expressway	S103 Road; Jangbei
Currently named S11 Pingru Expressway	S311 Road
Currently named S11 Pingru Expressway	X016 Road; Puji
Currently named S11 Pingru Expressway	Guanzhuang Service Area
Currently named S11 Pingru Expressway	X015 Road; Towards Felingshi-Guanzhuang
Currently named S11 Pingru Expressway	G60 Hukun Expressway
Currently named S11 Pingru Expressway	X005 Road; Liling
Currently named S11 Pingru Expressway	X027 Road; Jiashu
Currently named S11 Pingru Expressway	Service Area
Currently named S11 Pingru Expressway	G106 Road; Sifen
Currently named S11 Pingru Expressway	X039 Road; X040 Road; Huangtuling
Currently named S11 Pingru Expressway	X042 Road; Xialing
Currently named S11 Pingru Expressway	S319 Road; Zhongqiaxia; Towards Youxian
Currently named S11 Pingru Expressway	Service Area
Currently named S11 Pingru Expressway	Youxian
Currently named S11 Pingru Expressway	Youxian Service Area
Currently named S11 Pingru Expressway	G106 Road; Towards Caihuaping-Huju
Currently named S11 Pingru Expressway	G72 Quannnan Expressway
Currently named S11 Pingru Expressway	Concurrent with G72 Quannan Expressway
Currently named S11 Pingru Expressway	S320 Road; G106 Road; Chaling
Currently named S11 Pingru Expressway	Concurrent with G72 Quannan Expressway
Currently named S11 Pingru Expressway	G72 Quannnan Expressway
Currently named S11 Pingru Expressway	Chaling Service Area
Currently named S11 Pingru Expressway	G106 Road; Huaxin
Currently named S11 Pingru Expressway	S90 Jingyan Expressway
Currently named S11 Pingru Expressway	G106 Road; Towards Yanling
Currently named S11 Pingru Expressway	X064 Road; Luyuan Emperor Yan's Tomb
Currently named S11 Pingru Expressway	X064 Road; Chuanxing
Currently named S11 Pingru Expressway	G106 Road; Longzha
Currently named S11 Pingru Expressway	X007 Road; Sidu
Currently named S11 Pingru Expressway	G106 Road; Towards Beixing-Shatian
Currently named S11 Pingru Expressway	X006 Road; G106 Road; Nuanshui
Currently named S11 Pingru Expressway	G76 Xiarong Expressway
Currently named S11 Pingru Expressway	G106 Road; Rucheng
Currently named S11 Pingru Expressway	X013 Road; Towards Sanxing
Currently named S11 Pingru Expressway	Under Construction
Hunan Province; Guangdong Province
Currently named S27 Renshen Expressway	S10 Shaogan Expressway
Currently named S27 Renshen Expressway	G78 Shankun Expressway
Currently named S27 Renshen Expressway	G45 Daguang Expressway
Currently named S27 Renshen Expressway	S2 Guanghe Expressway; S14 Shanzhang Expressway
Currently named S27 Renshen Expressway	Under Construction
Currently named S27 Renshen Expressway	G35 Jiguang Expressway
Currently named S27 Renshen Expressway	G324 Road; Boluo
Currently named S27 Renshen Expressway	S120 Road; Tonghu
Currently named S27 Renshen Expressway	Qiaotou
Currently named S27 Renshen Expressway	Lilin
Currently named S27 Renshen Expressway	Xiegang Service Area
Currently named S27 Renshen Expressway	S20 Chaoguan Expressway
Currently named S27 Renshen Expressway	X886 Road; Qingxi
Currently named S27 Renshen Expressway	S359 Road; N Channel Road; Longgang
Currently named S27 Renshen Expressway	S255 Road; Fenggang
Currently named S27 Renshen Expressway	G15 Shenhai Expressway; G25 Changshen Expressway
Currently named S27 Renshen Expressway	Concurrent with G25 Changshen Expressway
Currently named S27 Renshen Expressway	S28 Shuiguan Expressway
Currently named S27 Renshen Expressway	G205 Road; Pingshan Towards Liuyue Station
Currently named S27 Renshen Expressway	Rongda Service Area
Currently named S27 Renshen Expressway	Yanpai Toll Station
Currently named S27 Renshen Expressway	Shenzhen Metropolitan Area
Currently named S27 Renshen Expressway	Yong'an Road; Towards S202 Road; Shenzhen-Yantian
Currently named S27 Renshen Expressway	S30 Huishen Coastal Expressway; S360 Road; Shenzhen-Yantian
South to North
