= Baitutan, Liling =

Baitutan 白兔潭镇
- Town
- Location within Hunan Location within China
- Coordinates: 27.7926°N 113.6694°E
- Country: China
- Province: Hunan
- Prefecture-level city: Zhuzhou
- County-level city: Liling

Area
  - Total: 48 km^{2} (19 sq mi)

Population (2010)
  - Total: 35,806
  - Density: 750/km^{2} (1,900/sq mi)

Baitutan (simplified Chinese: 白兔潭镇; traditional Chinese: 白兔潭鎮; pinyin: Báitùtán Zhèn; lit. 'white rabbit pond') is a town in the northeast of the county-level city of Liling, Zhuzhou, Hunan, China. The town spans an area of 48 square kilometres (19 mi^{2}), and has a population of 35,806 as of 2010.

== Toponymy ==
The town's name, which literally translates to 'white rabbit pond', is derived from a portion of the local Chengtan River (Chinese: 澄潭江; pinyin: Chéngtán Jiāng) with large rocks at the bottom said to look like white rabbits.

== History ==
Upon the establishment of the People's Republic of China, the area of Baitutan belonged to Hunan's First District (Chinese: 第一区; pinyin: Dì Yī Qū). Baitutan District (Chinese: 白兔潭区) was created in 1952. Baitutan was established as Tutan Township (Chinese: 兔潭乡; pinyin: Tùtán Xiāng) in 1956. Tutan Township was merged into the Pukou People's Commune (pinyin: Pǔkǒu Gōngshè) in 1958. The Baitutan People's Commune (pinyin: Báitùtán Gōngshè) was established in 1961. In 1984, people's communes were abolished, and Baitutan became a township. Baitutan was upgraded to a town in 1985.

Xinghu Village (Chinese: 星湖村; pinyin: Xīnghú Cūn), from the now-defunct town of Nanqiao, as well as the villages of Hetian (荷田), Boda (柏大) and Changqing (长庆) from the now-defunct town of Fuli were merged into Baitutan on November 26, 2015.

== Geography ==
Baitutan is located in the northeast of Liling, 25 kilometres (16 mi) from its center, and is bordered by the prefecture-level city of Pingxiang in neighboring Jiangxi province to the east.

== Administrative divisions ==
Baitutan administers 2 residential communities (Chinese: 社区; pinyin: Shèqū) and 10 administrative villages (Chinese: 行政村; pinyin: Xíngzhèng Cūn).

=== Residential communities ===
Baitutan administers the following 2 residential communities:

- Baishi Community (Chinese: 白市社区; pinyin: Báishì Shèqū; lit. 'white city community')
- Jinniu Community (Chinese: 金牛社区; pinyin: Jīnniú Shèqū; lit. 'golden cow community')

=== Administrative villages ===
Baitutan administers the following 10 villages:

- Tianxin Village (Chinese: 田心村)
- Tunxi Village (Chinese: 氽溪村)
- Zhutang Village (Chinese: 洙塘村)
- Huangjia Village (Chinese: 黄甲村)
- Qiaoling Village (Chinese: 峤岭村)
- Shanshui Village (Chinese: 山水村)
- Quanyuan Village (Chinese: 泉沅村)
- Changqing Village (Chinese: 长庆村)
- Hetian Village (Chinese: 荷田村)
- Boda Village (Chinese: 柏大村)

== Demographics ==
Baitutan had a population of 35,806 per the 2010 Chinese Census, up slightly from an estimated 34,500 in 2005. Baitutan had a recorded population of 32,360 in the 2000 Chinese Census.

== Economy ==
The town serves as a center for trade in the eastern portion of Liling.

== Transport ==
National Highway 106 passes through Baitutan.
