= Lushui River =

River in Jiangxi and Hunan, China

Coordinates: 27°41′38″N 113°07′24″E

The Lu River (Chinese: 渌水) is a right-bank tributary of the Xiang River. It rises in Shuijiang Town of Yichun, Jiangxi, and flows slowly westwards for 168.8 kilometres (104.9 mi) to the Xiang River. With its tributaries, the Lu has a drainage-basin area of 5,713 square kilometres (2,206 sq mi), and its watershed drains parts of four prefectures in Jiangxi and Hunan provinces. The Lu River is one of the largest tributaries of the Xiang. The main stream passes through the counties of Yuanzhou, Shangli, Anyuan and Xiangdong in Jiangxi and the counties of Liling and Zhuzhou in Hunan.
