= Guanzhuang =

Guanzhuang is the name of several places in the People's Republic of China:

== Guanzhuang (管庄) ==
- Guanzhuang, Beijing, a district of Beijing (Chinese: 管庄; pinyin: Guǎnzhuāng)
- Guǎnzhuang station, Beijing Subway (Chinese: 管庄; pinyin: Guǎnzhuāng)

== Guanzhuang (关庄) ==
- Guānzhuang station, Beijing Subway (Chinese: 关庄; pinyin: Guānzhuāng)

== Guanzhuang (官庄) ==
- Guanzhuang, Qianshan County, Anhui Province (Chinese: 官庄; pinyin: Guānzhuāng)
- Guanzhuang, Jiangyan, Jiangsu Province (Chinese: 官庄; pinyin: Guānzhuāng)
- Guanzhuang, Liling (官庄乡), a township of Liling City, Hunan
- Guanzhuang, Yuanling (官庄镇), a town of Yuanling County, Hunan
- Guanzhuang, Zhangqiu (官庄街道), Zhangqiu, Jinan, Shandong
