= Litian, Liling =

Town in Hunan, China

Litian Town 李畋镇
- Town
- Location in Hunan
- Coordinates: 27.857855°N 113.683688°E
- Country: People's Republic of China
- Province: Hunan
- Prefecture-level city: Zhuzhou
- County-level city: Liling

Area
  - Total: 122.59 km^{2} (47.33 sq mi)

Population (2016)
  - Total: 62,800
  - Density: 512/km^{2} (1,330/sq mi)
- Time zone: UTC+8 (China Standard)
- Postal code: 412299
- Area code: 0731

Litian (Chinese: 李畋镇; pinyin: Lǐtián zhèn) is a town of Liling City in Hunan Province, China. It is surrounded by Jingang Town on the north, Shangli County on the east, Guanzhuang Town on the west, and Baitutan Town on the south.

== History ==
The town was established by merging 14 villages of the historic Nanqiao Town (南桥镇) and 7 villages of the historic Fuli Town (富里镇) on November 26, 2015. As of 2015, it had a population of 62,800 and an area of 122.59 square kilometers.

== Administrative division ==
The town is divided into 21 villages and 2 communities.

English name	Chinese name	Notes
Nanqiao Village	南桥村	
Dongtang Village	东塘村	
Xinghuo Village	星火村	
Tongtang Village	潼塘村	
Jiangtang Village	将塘村	
Xinshu Village	新树村	
Qingshui Village	清水村	
Taiping Village	大平村	
Fengxing Village	凤形村	
Yumin Village	裕民村	
Minglan Village	明兰村	
Shixi Village	石溪村	
Hongyuan Village	洪源村	
Huamai Village	花麦村	
Huabu Village	华埠村	
Tangfang Village	塘坊村	
Cheshang Village	车上村	
Liqun Village	利群村	
Fuli Village	富里村	
Mashi Village	麻石村	
Shuangjiang Village	双江村	
Haitang Community	海棠社区	
Nanyuan Community	南园社区	

== Education ==
There are two middle schools and one primary school in the town: Nanqiao Middle School, Fuli Middle School and Nanqiao Central Primary School.

== Transportation ==
=== Railway ===
Shanghai–Kunming railway and Shanghai–Kunming high-speed railway, from Shanghai to Kunming, southwest China's Yunnan, through Litian Town.

=== National Highway ===
The G106 National Highway runs north-south through Litian Town.
