= Chuanwan, Liling =

Town in Hunan, China

Coordinates: 27.4277°N 113.4919°E

Chuanwan (Chinese: 船湾镇; pinyin: Chuánwān Zhèn) is a town of Liling City in Hunan Province, China. The town was rebuilt by merging the historic Chuanwan Town (Chinese: 船湾镇) and the historic Qingshuijiang Township (Chinese: 清水江乡) on November 26, 2015. As of 2015, it had a population of 53,400 and an area of 120.57 square kilometers.

== Administrative divisions ==
The town is divided into 8 villages and two districts: Sifang District, Jinziping District, Yutang Village, Xingqiao Village, Shili Village, Lejia Village, Taiqian Village, Chuanwan Village, Dajie Village, and Lishan Village.
