= Lu River =

Lu River may refer to:

- Lu River (Chinese: 泸水), an alternate name for Jinsha River, the upper stretches of the Yangtze River
- Lushui River (He River) (Chinese: 泸水), a tributary of He River (Chinese: 禾水) which is a tributary of Gan River
- Lushui River or Lu River, a tributary of Xiang River (Chinese: 渌水), Hunan Province
