= Zuoquan Town =

Zuoquan Town 仙霞镇
- Town
- Location in Hunan
- Coordinates: 27°42′11″N 113°19′21″E
- Country: People's Republic of China
- Province: Hunan
- Prefecture-level city: Zhuzhou
- County-level city: Liling

Area
  - Total: 58.7 km^{2} (22.7 sq mi)

Population
  - Total: 22,000
  - Density: 370/km^{2} (970/sq mi)
- Time zone: UTC+8 (China Standard)
- Area code: 0731

Zuoquan (simplified Chinese: 左权镇; traditional Chinese: 左權鎮; pinyin: Zuǒquán Zhèn) is a town of Liling City in Hunan Province, China. The town was established by merging the previous Xianxia (仙霞镇) and Xinyang (新阳乡) on November 26, 2015. As of 2018, the town had a population of 46,972 and an area of 122.96 square kilometers.

== Cityscape ==
The town is divided into 9 villages and 1 community, which include the following areas: Mojiazui Community, Shixingling Village, Qing'anpu Village, Miezhijie Village, Xianxia Village, Shanxiandian Village, Youtian Village, Zhaogaoduan Village, Yupan Village, and Dongjiangchong Village (莫家嘴社区、狮形岭村、清安铺村、蔑织街村、仙霞村、杉仙店村、油田村、赵高段村、玉潘村、东江冲村).
