= Chashan, Liling =

Town in Liling City, Hunan, China

Coordinates: 27.5841°N 113.3536°E

Chashan (Chinese: 茶山镇; pinyin: Cháshān Zhèn) is a town of Liling City in Hunan Province, China. The town was established by merging the historic Shenfugang Town (Chinese: 神福港镇) and the historic Lishanba Town (Chinese: 栗山坝镇) on November 26, 2015. As of 2015, it had a population of 66,100 and an area of 166.82 square kilometers.

== Cityscape ==
The town is divided into 12 villages and 3 communities, the following areas: Lishanba Community, Longjing Community, Chashan Community, Dashiqiao Village, Lengshui Village, Nantang Village, Chaxi Village, Shijuntang Village, Nanyuan Village, Changma Village, Meixiao Village, Shanghu Village, Shuangpang Village, Donggang Village, and Yingtian Village.
