= Anyuan Miners' Strike Memorial Hall =

Museum in Anyuan District, China

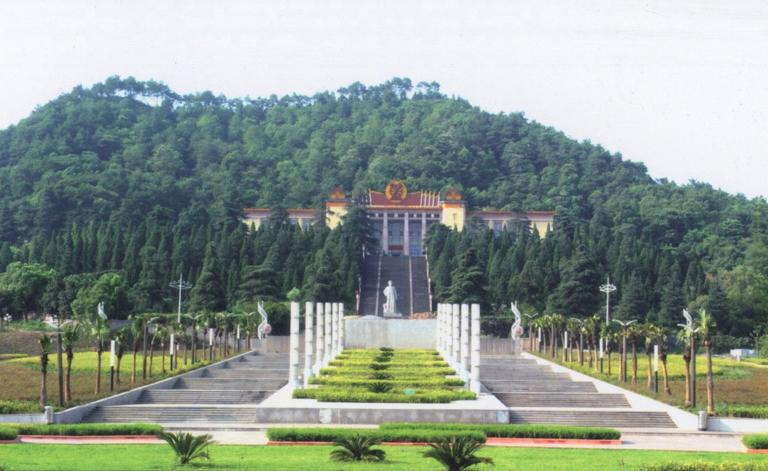
- Location: People's Republic of China
- Coordinates: 27.6084°N 113.8915°E
- Website: www.aymuseum.com
- Location of Anyuan Miners' Strike Memorial Hall

Anyuan Miners' Strike Memorial Hall (Chinese: 安源路矿工人运动纪念馆) is a museum in Anyuan District, Pingxiang, China. The museum memorializes part of the early revolutionary activity of Mao Zedong. Li Lisan and Liu Shaoqi are also commemorated.
