= Liling =

County-level city in Hunan, China

Liling 醴陵市
- County-level city
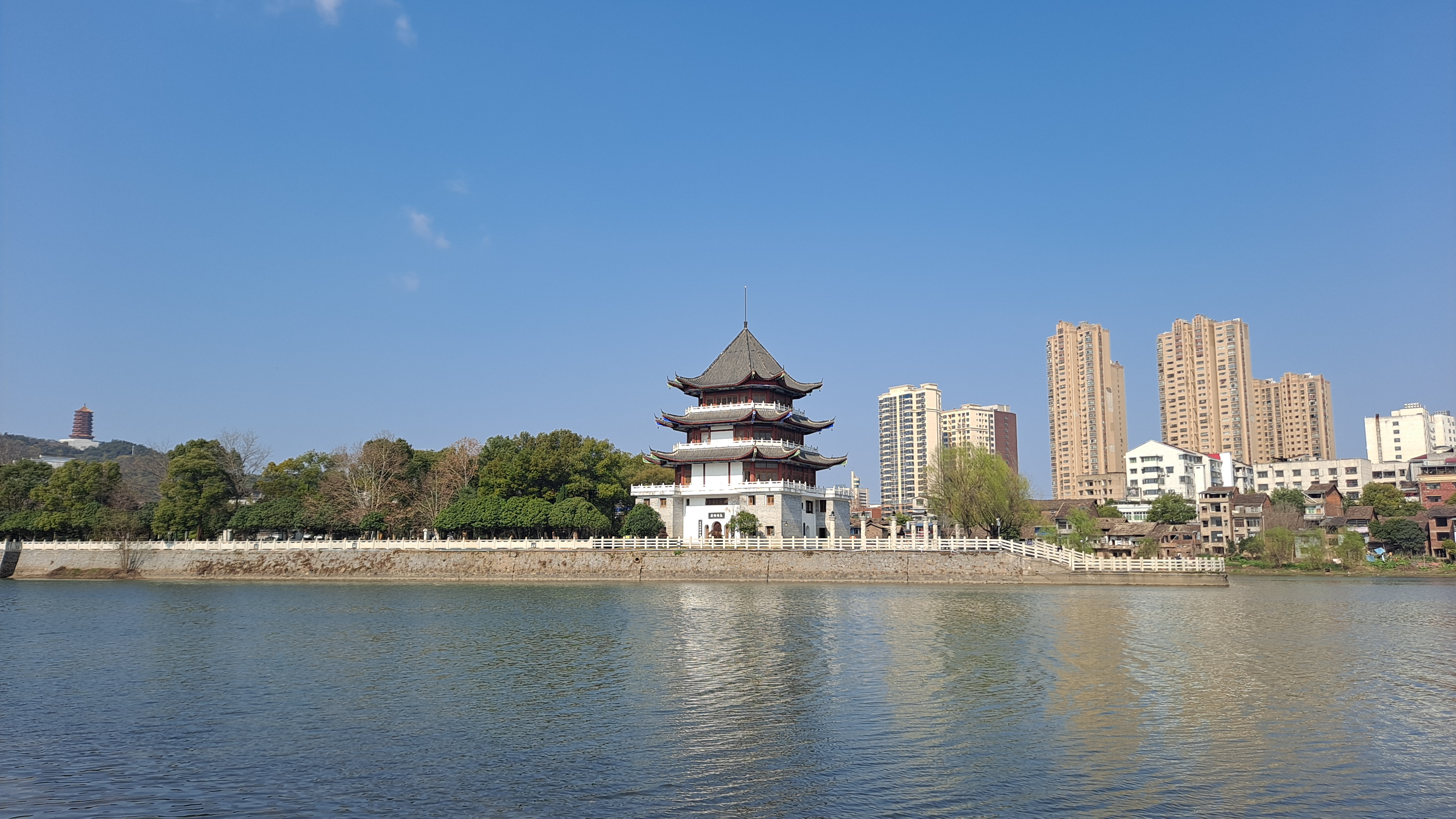
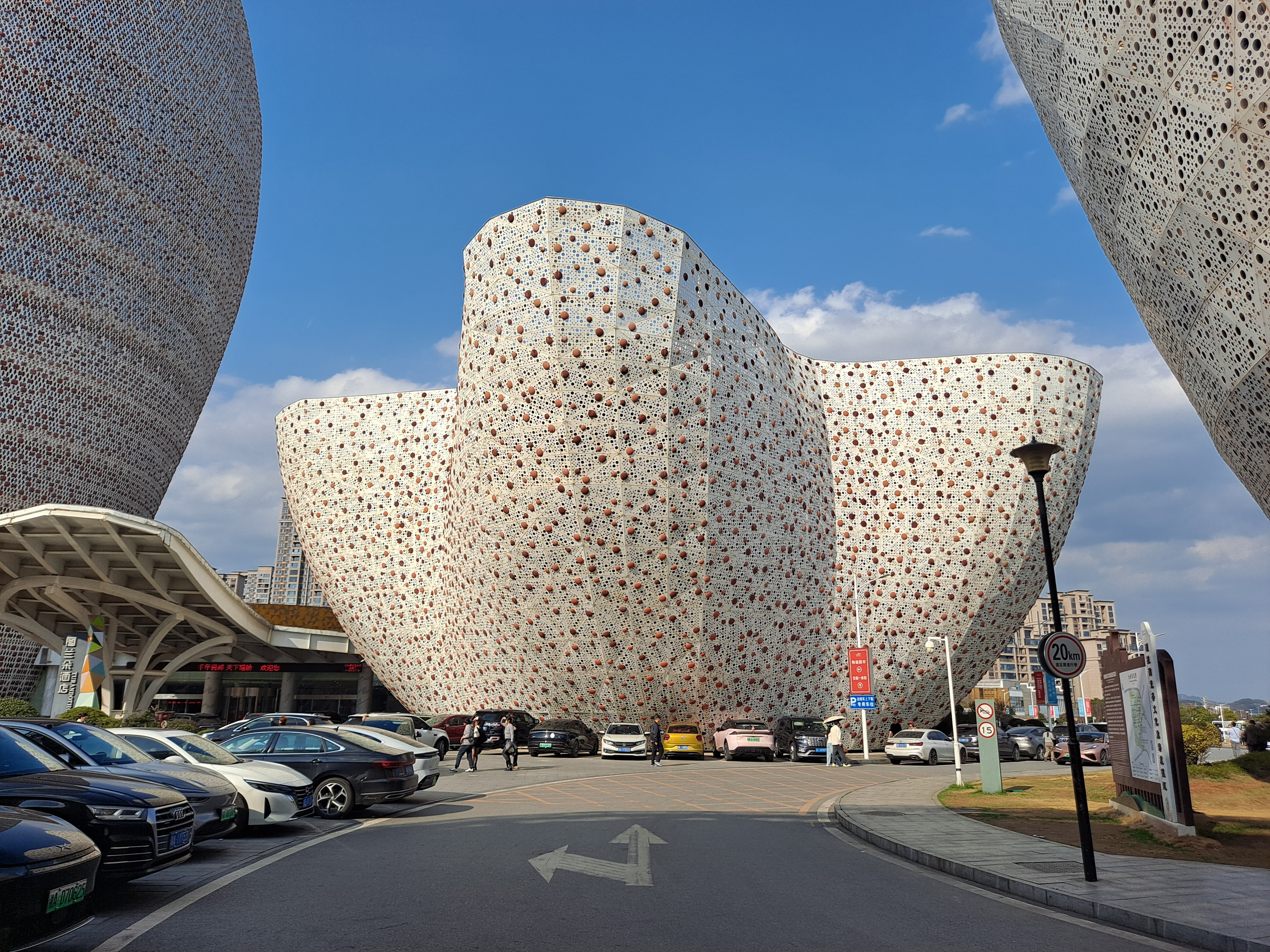
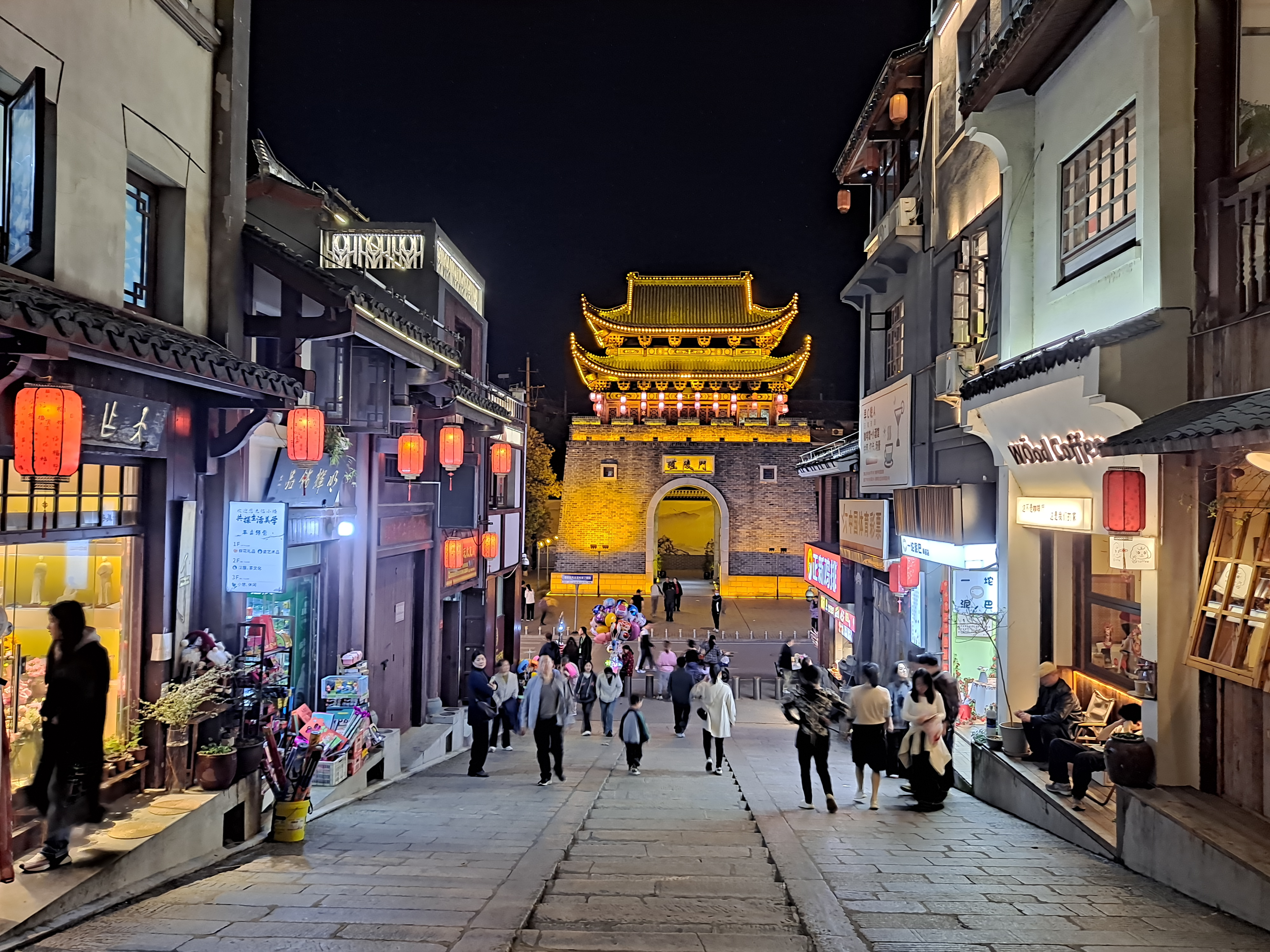
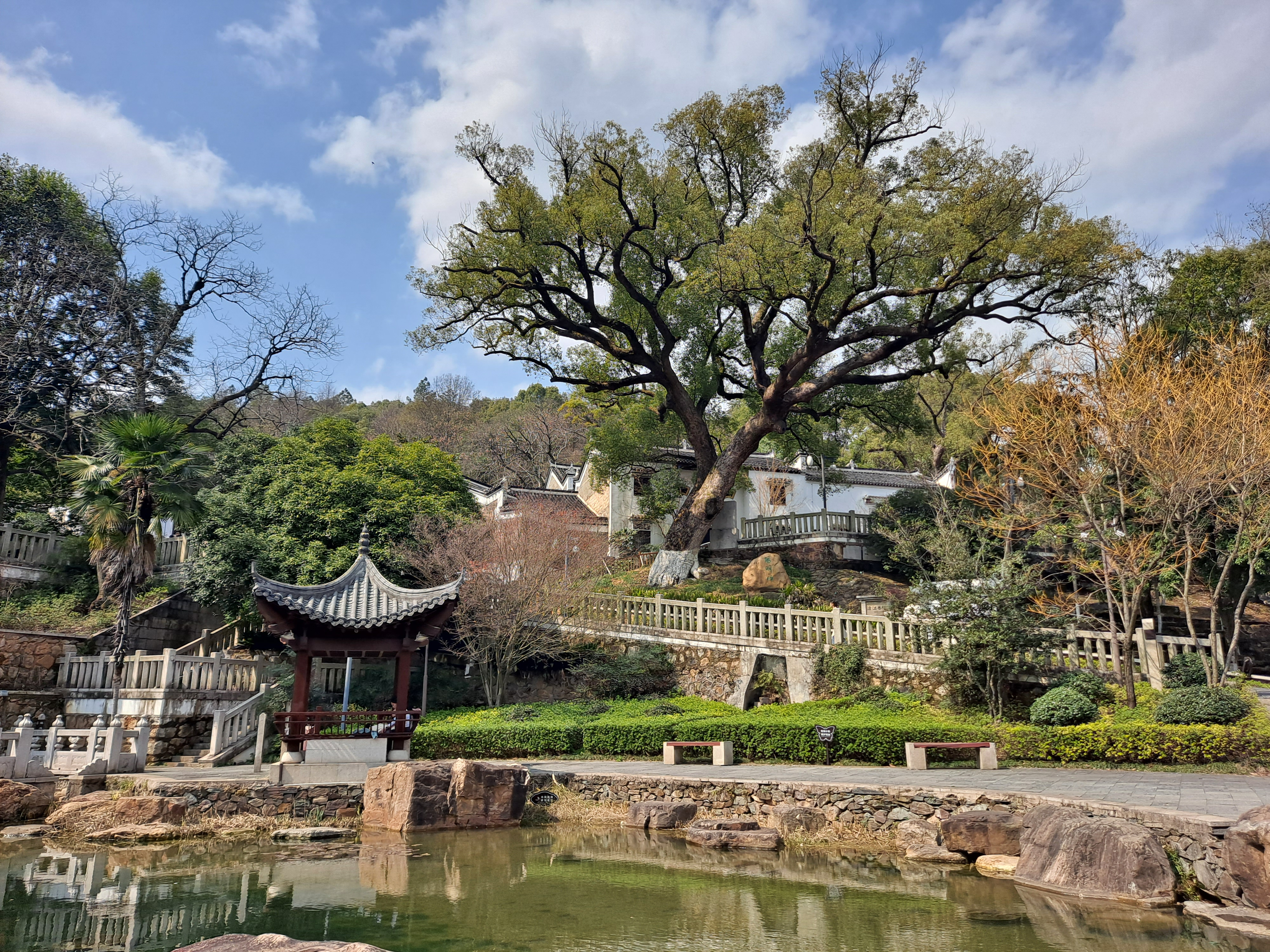
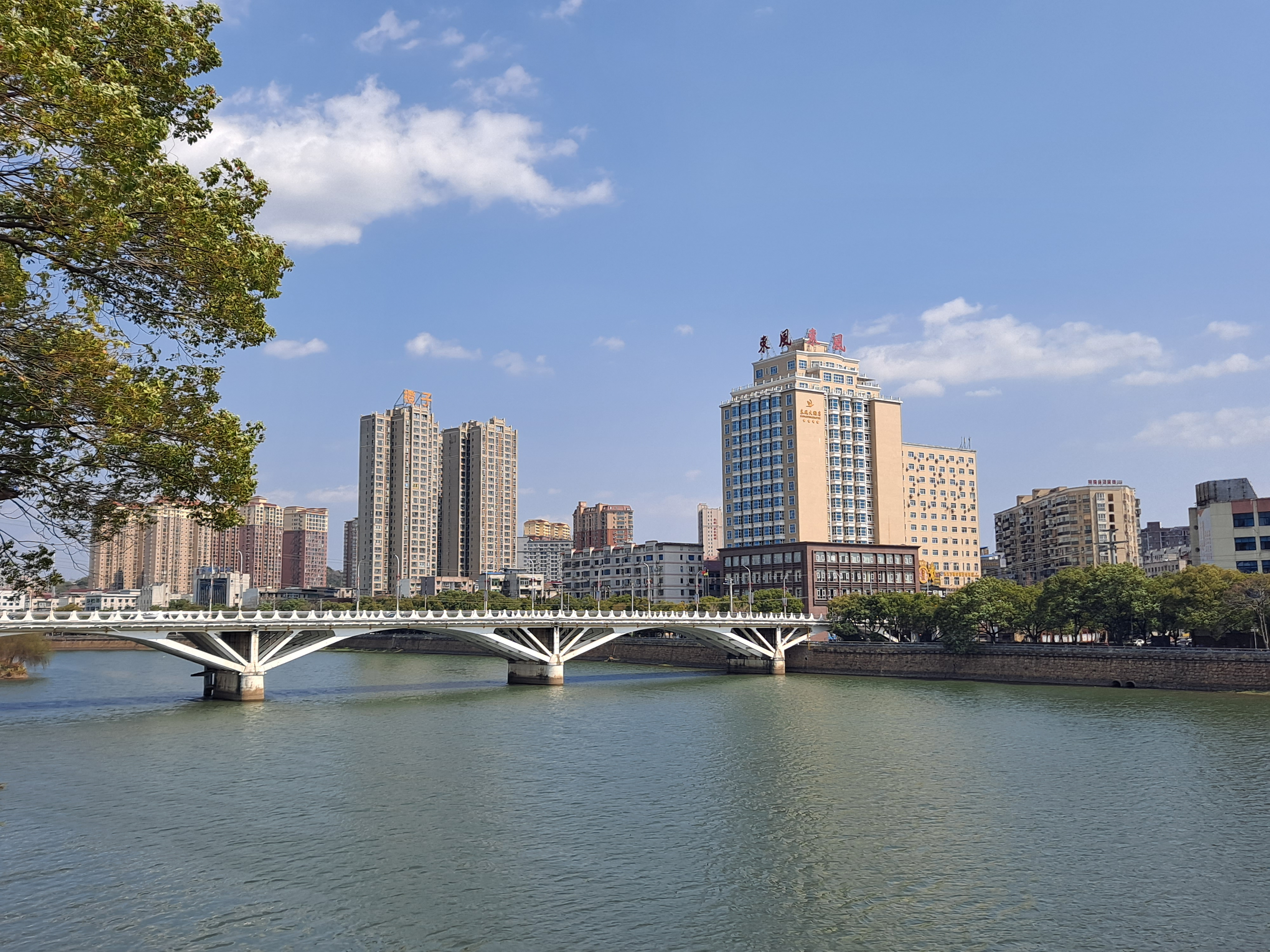
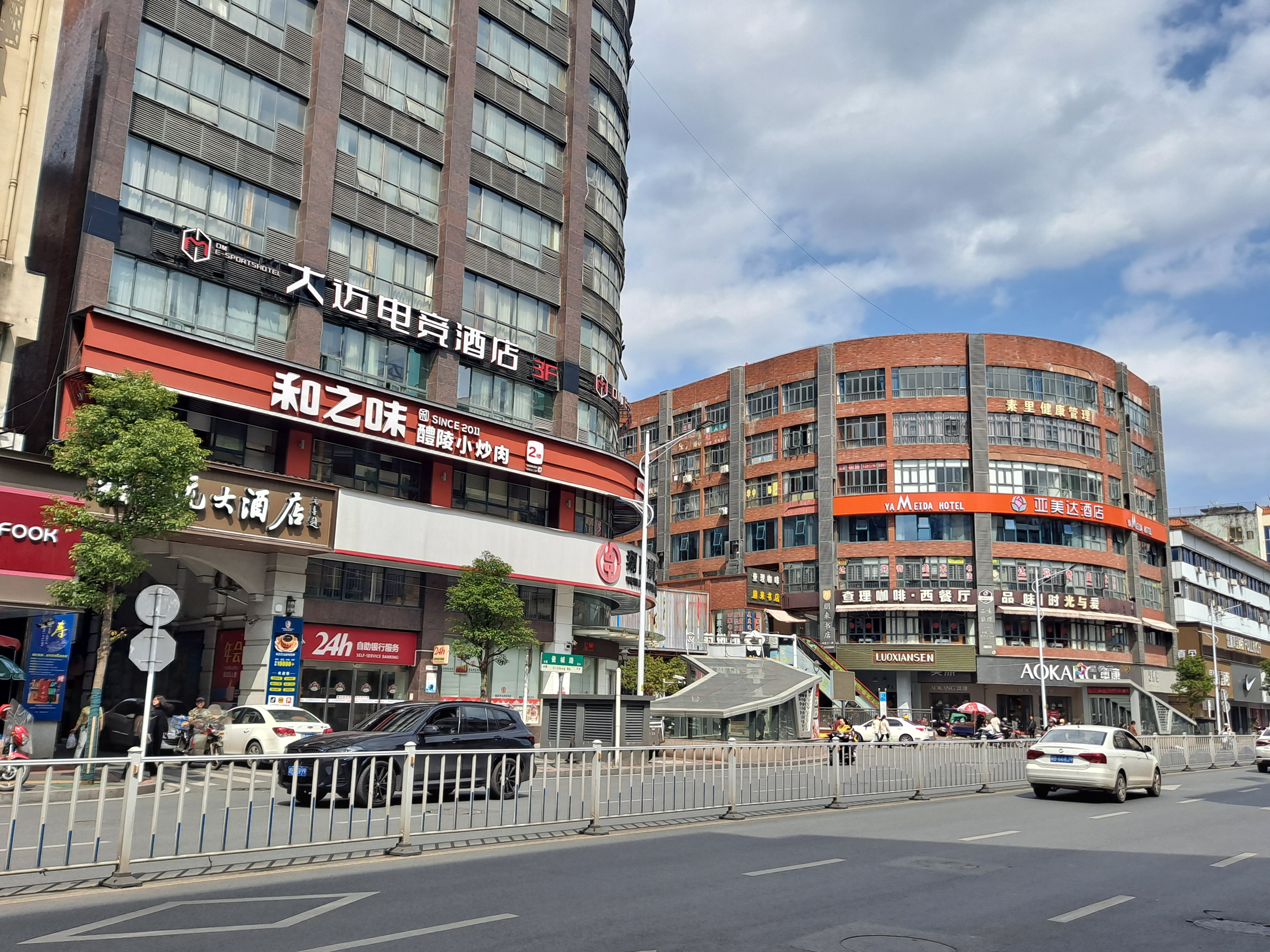
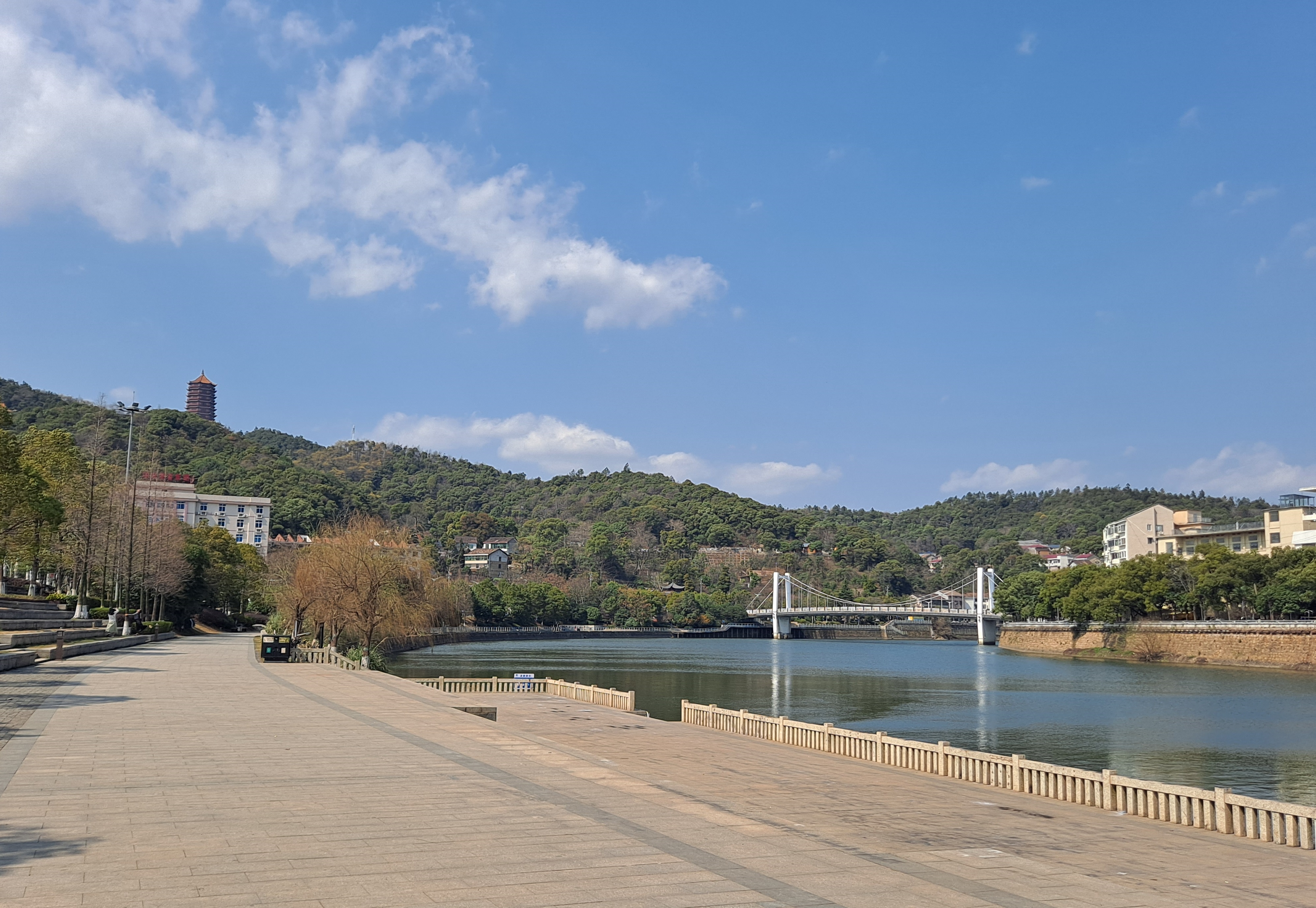
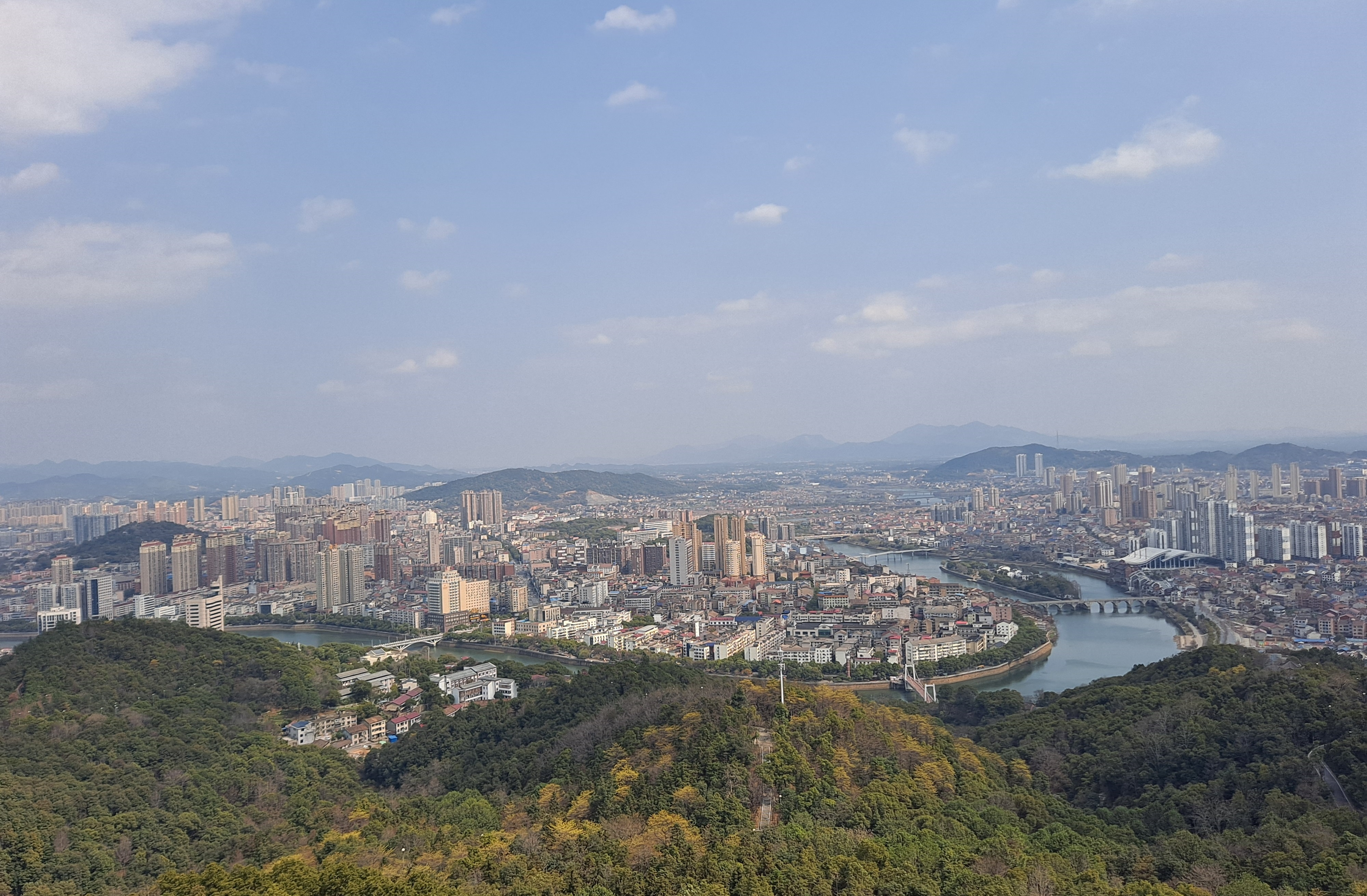
- Zhuangyuan Pavilion China Ceramics Valley Liling Gate Liling Lijiang Academy Xishan River Bridge Cicheng Road Bridge around the river View of Liling from Wangjiang Tower

- Location in Hunan
- Coordinates: 27°38′46″N 113°29′49″E
- Country: People's Republic of China
- Province: Hunan
- Prefecture-level city: Zhuzhou

Area
  - County-level city: 2,158.0 km^{2} (833.2 sq mi)
  - Urban: 113.80 km^{2} (43.94 sq mi)

Population (2017)
  - County-level city: 1,116,000
  - Density: 517.1/km^{2} (1,339/sq mi)
  - Urban: 247,500
- Time zone: UTC+8 (China Standard)

Liling (Chinese: 醴陵; pinyin: Lǐlíng) is a county-level city and the 12th most populous county-level division in Hunan Province, China, under the administration of the prefecture-level city of Zhuzhou. Located on the middle eastern margin of the province, the city is bordered to the north by Liuyang City, to the west by Lusong District and Zhuzhou County, to the south by You County, and to the east by Xiangdong District of Yichun, Shangli County of Jiangxi. Liling City covers 2,157 km^{2} (833 sq mi) with registered population of 978,900 and resident population of 1,060,000 (as of 2015).

Liling is known for its traditional porcelain and firework industries. The "Chairman Mao" porcelain produced in Liling is used as gifts for foreign heads of state.

Liling has extensive transport links, such as G60 (Hukun highway), S11 (Yueru Highway), 320, and 106 national roads. Also, there is the Liling Hukun High speed train station and Liling train station, which mainly serves trains going east and west across China as well as local trains in Hunan. Additionally, Liling is only 90 kilometres (56 mi) south of Changsha Huanghua International Airport (CSX).

Liling has had a booming economy since the beginning of the 21st century. In 2010, Liling had a GDP of 26.37 billion.

== Administrative divisions ==
According to the result on adjustment of township-level administrative divisions of Liling on November 26, 2015, the divisions of Liling, according to the result on adjustment of township-level administrative divisions of Liling on November 26, 2015: Qingshuijiang Township merged to Chuanwan Town, Hejiaqiao Town and Dazhang Town merged to Mingyue Town. Shenfugang Town and Lishanba Town merged to Chashan Town. Xinyang Township and Xianxia Town merged to Zuoquan Town. Fenglinshi Township and Huangtazui Town merged to Fenglin Town. Fuli Town and Nanqiao Town merged to Litian Town. Wangfang Town was revoked. Liling has four subdistricts and 19 towns under its jurisdiction.

English name	Chinese name	Population (2016)	Area (km^{2})	Notes
Yangsanshi Subdistrict	阳三石街道	52,200	37.23	
Xianyueshan Subdistrict	仙岳山街道	58,000	38	
Lailongmen Subdistrict	来龙门街道	82,500	26.15	
Guoci Subdistrict	国瓷街道	55,800	49.15	
Baitutan Town	白兔潭镇	69,700	72.03	
Banshan Town	板杉镇	41,100	89.94	
Chashan Town	茶山镇	66,100	166.82	
Chuanwan Town	船湾镇	53,400	120.57	
Dongfu Town	东富镇	40,000	80.38	
Fenglin Town	枫林镇	42,900	100.52	
Guanzhuang Town	官庄镇	18,300	184.92	
Jiashu Town	嘉树镇	25,000	63.11	
Junchu Town	均楚镇	42,900	166.6	
Litian Town	李畋镇	62,800	122.59	
Mingyue Town	明月镇	72,400	169.1	
Pukou Town	浦口镇	59,600	79.13	
Shentan Town	沈潭镇	27,000	54	
Shiting Town	石亭镇	41,000	107	
Sifen Town	泗汾镇	42,000	62.5	
Sunjiawan Town	孙家湾镇	22,700	52.78	
Wangxian Town	王仙镇	48,700	86.87	
Weishan Town	沩山镇	24,000	86.03	
Zuoquan Town	左权镇	48,100	122.96	

== Geography ==
Liling is situated in the east of Hunan province. The city has a total area of 2,156.46-square-kilometre (832.61 sq mi). It is bordered by Pingxiang and Shangli County to the east, Liuyang to the north, Zhuzhou to the west, You County to the south.

=== Rivers ===
Major rivers of Liliang are Lu River, Chengjiang River, Jiubu River, Zhaoling River and Jiang River.

=== Lakes and reservoirs ===
Guanzhuang Reservoir is the largest body of water and the largest reservoir in Liling.

Other reservoirs include Hetian Reservoir, Xuefeng Reservoir, Wangxianqiao Reservoir, Zhoufang Reservoir and Outang Reservoir.

=== Mountains ===
The highest point in Mount Shamaojian (纱帽尖) is which stands 808 metres (2,651 ft) above sea level.

Zhangxianling (彰仙岭) is the second highest natural elevation in the city, which is 707 metres (2,320 ft) above sea level.

=== Climate ===
Liling has a subtropical monsoon climate, with an average annual temperature of 18 °C (64 °F), total annual rainfall of 1,300-to-1,600-millimetre (51 to 63 in), a frost-free period of 288 days and annual average sunshine hours in 1500 to 1910 hours.

Climate data for Liling, elevation 74 m (243 ft), (1991–2020 normals, extremes 1981–2010)
Month	Jan	Feb	Mar	Apr	May	Jun	Jul	Aug	Sep	Oct	Nov	Dec	Year
Record high °C (°F)	26.9 (80.4)	30.4 (86.7)	35.1 (95.2)	36.3 (97.3)	36.7 (98.1)	37.8 (100.0)	40.7 (105.3)	40.7 (105.3)	38.5 (101.3)	36.0 (96.8)	32.7 (90.9)	25.2 (77.4)	40.7 (105.3)
Mean daily maximum °C (°F)	9.6 (49.3)	12.6 (54.7)	16.7 (62.1)	23.3 (73.9)	27.9 (82.2)	30.9 (87.6)	34.4 (93.9)	33.7 (92.7)	29.9 (85.8)	24.7 (76.5)	18.7 (65.7)	12.5 (54.5)	22.9 (73.2)
Daily mean °C (°F)	5.9 (42.6)	8.4 (47.1)	12.3 (54.1)	18.2 (64.8)	22.9 (73.2)	26.3 (79.3)	29.3 (84.7)	28.5 (83.3)	24.8 (76.6)	19.5 (67.1)	13.6 (56.5)	8.0 (46.4)	18.1 (64.6)
Mean daily minimum °C (°F)	3.4 (38.1)	5.6 (42.1)	9.2 (48.6)	14.7 (58.5)	19.3 (66.7)	23.0 (73.4)	25.6 (78.1)	25.0 (77.0)	21.3 (70.3)	15.8 (60.4)	10.1 (50.2)	4.9 (40.8)	14.8 (58.7)
Record low °C (°F)	−5.0 (23.0)	−6.3 (20.7)	−2.2 (28.0)	2.3 (36.1)	9.4 (48.9)	13.7 (56.7)	18.0 (64.4)	18.1 (64.6)	13.3 (55.9)	3.5 (38.3)	−0.8 (30.6)	−10.2 (13.6)	−10.2 (13.6)
Average precipitation mm (inches)	77.3 (3.04)	89.0 (3.50)	178.0 (7.01)	176.3 (6.94)	218.2 (8.59)	235.7 (9.28)	164.2 (6.46)	130.6 (5.14)	79.1 (3.11)	60.5 (2.38)	85.8 (3.38)	63.9 (2.52)	1,558.6 (61.35)
Average precipitation days (≥ 0.1 mm)	15.2	14.3	18.3	17.6	16.4	15.5	10.6	12.6	9.2	8.7	10.8	11.4	160.6
Average snowy days	3.0	1.6	0.3	0	0	0	0	0	0	0	0	0.9	5.8
Average relative humidity (%)	81	80	82	80	80	81	76	77	78	76	78	78	79
Mean monthly sunshine hours	57.5	62.0	73.9	100.9	130.7	136.9	226.1	202.3	160.6	138.9	116.7	97.9	1,504.4
Percentage possible sunshine	17	19	20	26	31	33	54	50	44	39	36	30	33
Source: China Meteorological Administration

== Economy ==
Liling is one of the most developed county-level cities in Hunan, it ranked the 60th in the Top100 of counties and county-level cities of China by comprehensive strength in 2020. Liling has the six-largest economy in the Hunan. The largest sectors of the city's economy are fireworks and porcelain manufacturing. As of 2016, the gross domestic product of Liling was CN¥ 58.08 billion. The primary sector, including agriculture, fishing, forestry and mining, accounted for 9% of the county's GDP. Secondary industries, including manufacturing, construction, transport and communications, made up 28% of GDP. And the tertiary sector of trade, finance, services and public administration, accounted for nearly 63% of GDP.

== Demographics ==
=== Population ===
As of the end of 2016, the National Bureau of Statistics of the People's Republic of China estimates the city's population now to be 1,060,000.

=== Language ===
Mandarin is the official language. The local people speak both Xiang dialect and Liling dialect.

=== Religion ===
As of 2016, most of Liling people are atheists. They worship Chinese folk religion. Only 1% of Liling people belong to Buddhists, 1% are Taoists, 1% are Roman Catholics and Protestants.

== Education ==
As of 2016, Liling has 213 primary schools, 44 middle schools, nine high schools, one special education school and 309 kindergartens.

== Transportation ==
=== Railway ===
Shanghai–Kunming railway and Shanghai–Kunming high-speed railway, which connect Shanghai and Kunming, run north–south through the towns and subdistrict of Litian, Baitutan, Pukou, Wangxian, Xianyueshan, Dongfu, Sunjiawan, Sifen, and Chuanwan.

Liling–Chaling railway and Liling-Yongzhou railway run north–south through the city.

=== Expressway ===
- G60 Shanghai–Kunming Expressway
- Yueru Expressway
- Litan Expressway
- Lianzhu Expressway
- Louli Expressway

=== National Highway ===
- G106 National Highway
- G320 National Highway

== Tourism ==
Guanzhuang, Lu River Bridge, Geng Chuan Ancestral Temple, Lujiang Academy, Former Residence of Li Lisan, Former Residence of Chen Mingren, and Xianshan Park are popular attractions in Liling.

Changqing Temple, Yunyang Temple and Dongfu Temple are well known Buddhist temples.

== Notable people ==
- Li Tian
- Cai Shenxi, a general officer in the Chinese Workers' and Peasants' Red Army during the Chinese Civil War.
- Chen Mingren, a general in the People's Liberation Army.
- Cheng Qian, governor of Hunan.
- Cheng Xingling, politician.
- Geng Biao, Minister of Defense of the People's Republic of China.
- He Jian (Ho Chien), a native of Liling, was Nanjing's governor of Hunan during the time of the Kuomintang. He killed more than 20,000 peasants, students, and workers between April and June, 1927.
- Li Lisan, an early leader of the Chinese communists, and the top leader of the Chinese Communist Party from 1928 to 1930, member of the Politburo, and later a member of the Central Committee.
- Peng Daoru, electronics expert.
- Song Shilun, a general in the People's Liberation Army.
- Tang Fei-fan, a medical microbiologist best known for culturing the Chlamydia trachomatis agent in the yolk sacs of eggs.
- Yang Dezhi, a general in the People's Liberation Army.
- Yang Mingzhu, mathematician.
- Zhang Yousong, translator.
- Zhang Zemin, scientist.
- Zuo Quan, a military officer in the Eighth Route Army.
