= Zhang Wei =

Zhang Wei or Zhangwei may refer to:

== People ==
=== Sportspeople ===
- Zhang Wei (badminton, born 1977) (张尉), Chinese badminton player, winner of the 2000 Thailand Open
- Zhang Wei (badminton, born 1987) (张伟), Chinese badminton player, winner of the 2001 Sudirman Cup
- Zhang Wei (basketball) (張伟 born 1986), female Chinese basketball player
- Zhang Wei (figure skater) (張崴), Chinese ice dancer
- Zhang Wei (footballer, born 1988) (张炜), Chinese footballer who plays for Kunshan in the CLO
- Zhang Wei (footballer, born January 1993) (张卫), Chinese footballer who plays for Nantong Zhiyun in the CSL
- Zhang Wei (footballer, born March 1993) (张卫), Chinese footballer who plays for Shanghai SIPG in the CSL
- Zhang Wei (footballer, born 2000) (张威), Chinese footballer who plays for Hebei China Fortune in the CSL
- Zhang Wei (goalball) (张魏, born 1989), Chinese goalball player
- Zhang Wei (pole vaulter) (张伟 born 1994), Chinese pole vaulter

=== Other people ===
- Zhang Wei (painter) (张伟, born 1952), Chinese painter, member of the No Name Group
- Zhang Wei (author) (张炜, born 1956), Chinese author
- Wei Zhang (computer engineer), professor in Hong Kong
- Wei Zhang (mathematician) (张伟, born 1981), Chinese mathematician
- Wowkie Zhang (张伟, born 1983), Chinese singer and actor, former member of The Flowers
- Zhang Wei (actor), Singaporean actor; see List of MediaCorp Channel 8 Chinese Drama Series (2000s)
- Zhang Wei (張衛), younger brother of the Eastern Han dynasty warlord Zhang Lu
- Zhang Wei (director) (born 1965), Chinese film director, known for Factory Boss
- Zhang Wei, also known as Tang Jia San Shao

== Places in China ==
- Zhangwei, Heilongjiang (张维), town in Suihua, Heilongjiang
- Zhangwei Township (张圩乡), township in Shuyang County, Jiangsu

== See also ==
- Wang Wei (disambiguation)
- Wang Fang (disambiguation)
