= Fenglin =

Fenglin may refer to the following places:

== China ==
=== Towns ===
- Fenglin, Liling, a town in Liling City, Hunan
- Fenglin, De'an (丰林镇), a town in De'an County, Jiangxi

=== Subdistricts and townships ===
- Fenglin Subdistrict, a subdistrict of Xinhua County, Hunan
- Fenglin Subdistrict, Yushan (枫林街道), a subdistrict of Yushan County, Jiangxi
- Fenglin Subdistrict, Weihai (凤林街道), a subdistrict of Huancui District, Weihai, Shandong
- Fenglin, Xuanhan (凤林乡), a township in Xuanhan County, Sichuan

== Taiwan ==
- Fenglin, Hualien, a township in central Hualien County

== See also ==
- Zhang Fenglin (born 10 March 1993), a Chinese swimmer
- He Fenglin (1873–1935), a general of the Republic of China
