= Mingyue Town =

Town in Hunan Province, China

Coordinates: 27.4632°N 113.4126°E

Mingyue (Chinese: 明月镇; pinyin: míng-yuè zhèn) is a town of Liling City in Hunan Province, China. The town was established by merging the previous Hejiaqiao (贺家桥镇) and Dazhang (大障镇) on November 26, 2015. As of 2015, the town had a population of 72,400 and an area of 169.1 square kilometers.

== Administrative divisions ==
The town is divided into 16 villages and four districts: Dazhang district, Jianxiang district, Xiaoxiang district, Baizhouguo district, Dongjiang Village, Shuangqiao Village, Luojiakou Village, Jiangbianpu Village, Chaichong Village, Xinlian Village, Yanshan Village, Wanfu Village, Taojialong Village, Shenming Village, Wangjialong Village, Malian Village, Zhaijiang Village, Danzikeng Village, Wangjiaqiao Village, Xilin Village.
