= Junchu, Liling =

Town in Hunan, China

Coordinates: 27.5740°N 113.2653°E

Junchu Town (simplified Chinese: 均楚镇; traditional Chinese: 均楚鎮; pinyin: Jūnchǔ Zhèn) is an urban town in Liling City, Zhuzhou City, Hunan Province, People's Republic of China.

== Cityscape ==
The town is divided into 17 villages and 2 communities, which include the following areas: Jinshan Community, Junchuqiao Community, Zhoufang Village, Zhangqiao Village, Laowan Village, Qingshan Village, Junshan Village, Lipotang Village, Dalongzhou Village, Daixingqiao Village, Panjiachong Village, Zhaogongling Village, Majialong Village, Heyeba Village, Changling'ao Village, Rixinqiao Village, Huangtian Village, and Huanggu Village.
