= Fenglin, Liling =

Town in Hunan, China

Fenglin (Chinese: 枫林镇; pinyin: Fēnglín Zhèn) is a town of Liling City in Hunan Province, China. The town was established by merging the historic Fenglinshi Township (Chinese: 枫林市乡) and Huangtazui Town (Chinese: 黄獭嘴镇) on November 26, 2015. As of 2015, it had a population of 42,900 and an area of 100.52 square kilometers.
