= Lailongmen, Liling =

Subdistrict of Liling, Hunan, China

Coordinates: 27.6735°N 113.5042°E

Lailongmen Subdistrict (simplified Chinese: 来龙门街道; traditional Chinese: 來龍門街道; pinyin: Láilóngmén Jiēdào) is a subdistrict in Liling City, Zhuzhou City, Hunan Province, People's Republic of China. As of the 2000 census it had a population of 59,000 and an area of 18.4 square kilometers.

== Cityscape ==
The township is divided into 4 villages and 7 communities, the following areas: Mafangtang Community, Sitang Community, Wenmiao Community, Shengli Community, Beimen Community, Shizipo Community, Dingjiafang Community, Shangzhou Village, Shantian Village, Ma'ao Village, and Dong'an Village (马放塘社区、四塘社区、文庙社区、胜利社区、北门社区、狮子坡社区、丁家坊社区、上洲村、珊田村、马脑村、东岸村).
