= Dongfu, Liling =

Urban town in Liling, Hunan, China

Coordinates: 27.6127°N 113.5559°E

Dongfu Town (simplified Chinese: 东富镇; traditional Chinese: 東富鎮; pinyin: Dōngfù Zhèn) is an urban town in Liling City, Zhuzhou City, Hunan Province, People's Republic of China.

== Cityscape ==
The town is divided into 24 villages and 1 community, the following areas: Siyang Community, Dongfu Village, Xiaodongtang Village, Shibashang Village, Beichong Village, Xilin Village, Fengyitang Village, Baochong Village, Tongqiao Village, Chudongqiao Village, Longyuanchong Village, Huamu Village, Zhiquan Village, Lixin Village, Xinlian Village, Shilipu Village, Lianshitang Village, Senchong Village, Fulong Village, Jingtan Village, Tanwan Village, Hengyan Village, Jianxin Village, Huangtuba Village, and Shiwan Village.
