= Huangtazui, Liling =

Town in Liling, Hunan, China

Coordinates: 27.7927°N 113.4207°E

Huangtazui Town (simplified Chinese: 黄獭嘴镇; traditional Chinese: 黃獺嘴鎮; pinyin: Huangtazui Zhen), is an urban town in Liling City, Zhuzhou City, Hunan Province, People's Republic of China.

== Cityscape ==
The town is divided into 9 villages and 2 communities, the following areas: Huangtazui Community, Shechong Community, Longxing'ao Village, Jinji Village, Shixingshan Village, Taizhou Village, Dawan Village, Shuangjing Village, Yangjialong Village, Jiaoyuan Village, and Zhubaozhang Village.
