= Shentan, Liling =

Town in Liling, Hunan, China

Coordinates: 27.5230°N 113.5524°E

Shentan Town (simplified Chinese: 沈潭镇; traditional Chinese: 瀋潭鎮; pinyin: Shěntán Zhèn) is an urban town in Liling City, Zhuzhou City, Hunan Province, People's Republic of China.

== Cityscape ==
The town is divided into 12 villages and 3 communities, which include the following areas: Pingli Community, Xinghu Community, Mapoli Community, Meitian Village, Jingxian Village, Aoxian Village, Zhashi Village, Sanxingli Village, Shentan Village, Panglong Village, Xintian Village, Jiangkou Village, Shuanglong Village, Xintang Village, and Xiaxing Village.
