= Banshan, Liling =

Town in Liling, Hunan, China

Coordinates: 27.7078°N 113.4358°E

Banshan Township (simplified Chinese: 板杉乡; traditional Chinese: 板杉鄉; pinyin: Bǎnshān Xiāng) is a rural township in Liling City, Zhuzhou City, Hunan Province, People's Republic of China.

== History ==
The town is famous for its fireworks production tradition.

During the 2020 census, the township has a population of 28,383 people.

In July 2023, an explosion occurred at an illegal fireworks and firecrackers production site in Zhuhuashan Village in the township. The incident has resulted in 5 deaths.

== Administrative divisions ==
The township is divided into 19 villages: Tuzhuling Village, Yangjiawan Village, Zhuhuashan Village, Shangping Village, Hongguang Village, Xiapingqiao Village, Changpokou Village, Huangtang Village, Dashiqiao Village, Gucheng Village, Gengjing Village, Liubiqiao Village, Dongchongpu Village, Tangjiachong Village, Leiguqiao Village, Babuqiao Village, Dawulong Village, Fengshuqiao Village, and Zhaixia Village.
