= Wangxian, Liling =

Wangxian Town 王仙镇
- Town
- Location in Hunan
- Coordinates: 27°44′15″N 113°35′26″E
- Country: People's Republic of China
- Province: Hunan
- Prefecture-level city: Zhuzhou
- County-level city: Liling

Area
  - Total: 58.28 km^{2} (22.50 sq mi)

Population
  - Total: 30,000
  - Density: 510/km^{2} (1,300/sq mi)
- Time zone: UTC+8 (China Standard)
- Postal code: 412200
- Area code: 0733

Wangxian Town (simplified Chinese: 王仙镇; traditional Chinese: 王仙鎮; pinyin: Wángxiān Zhèn) is an urban town in Liling City, Hunan Province, People's Republic of China.

== Cityscape ==
The town is divided into 12 villages and 3 communities, which include the following areas: Zhongxin Community, Xinmin Community, Cinikuang Community, Lishan Village, Maqiao Village, Shutang Village, Guankou Village, Wangxian Village, Situ Village, Xiangshui Village, Sanshi Village, Shiyan Village, Shuangjiang Village, Qingtan Village, and Zhuangbu Village (中心社区、新民社区、瓷泥矿社区、李山村、马桥村、书堂村、观口村、王仙村、司徒村、香水村、三狮村、石燕村、双江村、清潭村、庄埠村).
