= Cai Shenxi =

Chinese military officer (1906–1932)

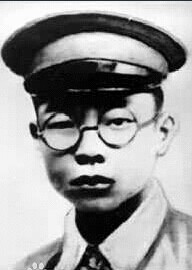

Cai Shenxi (Chinese: 蔡申熙) (February 12, 1906 – October 9, 1932) was a general officer in the Chinese Red Army during the Chinese Civil War. He was born in Liling, Hunan. He joined the Chinese Communist Party in 1924. In 1926, he participated in the Northern Expedition. In August 1927, he participated in the Nanchang uprising. He fought against the Kuomintang at Sanhe, Dabu County, Guangdong. In December 1927, he participated in the Guangzhou Uprising. He led the attack on Xiajiang County, Jiangxi in November 1929. He was killed in action in Hong'an County, Hubei.
