= Nanqiao, Liling =

Former town in Hunan Province, China

Coordinates: 27.8545°N 113.6732°E

Nanqiao 南桥镇
- 1956–2015
- Area
  - 2005: 98.87 km^{2} (38.17 sq mi)
- Population
  - 1996: 41,000
  - 2000: 39,295
  - 2005: 41,500
  - 2010: 40,556
  - Type: Town
- History
  - Established: 1956
  - Disestablished: 2015
- Today part of: Litian; Baitutan

Nanqiao Town (simplified Chinese: 南桥镇; traditional Chinese: 南橋鎮; pinyin: Nanqiao Zhen) was a town in the northeast portion of Liling City, Zhuzhou City, Hunan Province, People's Republic of China. The town spanned an area of 98.87 square kilometres (38.17 sq mi), and had a population of 40,556 as of 2010.

== Toponymy ==
Nanqiao was named after the Lanxi Bridge (Chinese: 兰溪桥; pinyin: Lánxī Qiáo), which was located within the town.

== History ==
Upon the establishment of the People's Republic of China, Nanqiao belonged to Hunan's District 1 (Chinese: 第一区; pinyin: Dì Yī Qū). Nanqiao Township (Chinese: 南桥乡; pinyin: Nánqiáo Xiāng) was established in 1956.

In 1958, Nanqiao Township became the Nanqiao People's Commune (Chinese: 南桥公社; pinyin: Nánqiáo Gōngshè), as part of the establishment of people's communes. Nanqiao was reverted to a township in 1984.

Nanqiao was upgraded to a town in 1995.

In 2015, Nanqiao was abolished, and split between the towns of Litian and Baitutan.

== Geography ==
Nanqiao was located 31 kilometres (19 mi) from the city center of Liling.

== Administrative divisions ==
=== Before abolition ===
Before its abolition in 2015, Nanqiao administered 1 residential community (Chinese: 社区; pinyin: Shèqū) and 15 administrative villages (Chinese: 行政村; pinyin: Xíngzhèng Cūn).

==== Residential communities ====
Nanqiao's sole residential community was Nanyuan Community (Chinese: 南园社区).

==== Administrative villages ====
Nanqiao administered the following 15 villages:

- Dongtang Village (Chinese: 东塘村)
- Tongtang Village (Chinese: 潼塘村)
- Jiangtang Village (Chinese: 将塘村)
- Qingshui Village (Chinese: 清水村)
- Nanqiao Village (Chinese: 南桥村)
- Dacaoping Village (Chinese: 大草坪村)
- Xinghu Village (Chinese: 星湖村)
- Yumin Village (Chinese: 裕民村)
- Fengxing Village (Chinese: 凤形村)
- Minglan Village (Chinese: 明兰村)
- Shixi Village (Chinese: 石溪村)
- Hongyuan Village (Chinese: 洪源村)
- Huamai Village (Chinese: 花麦村)
- Xinghuo Village (Chinese: 星火村)
- Xinshu Village (Chinese: 新树村)

=== After abolition ===
Upon Nanqiao's abolition in 2015, all of its administrative divisions were merged into Litian, sans Xinghu Village, which was merged into Baitutan.

== Demographics ==
Nanqiao had a population of 40,556 per the 2010 Chinese Census, down from an estimated population of 41,500 in 2005. Nanqiao had a population of 39,295 in the 2000 Chinese Census, and about 41,000 per a 1996 estimate.

== Transportation ==
National Highway 106 and the Liling-Liuyang railway both ran through Nanqiao.
