= Wanfang (disambiguation) =

Wanfang is a Taiwanese singer, actress and radio DJ.

Wanfang may also refer to:

- Wanfang Community metro station, a station on Brown Line of the Taipei Metro
- Wanfang Hospital metro station, a station on the Brown Line of the Taipei Metro

== See also ==
- Wan Fang, Chinese playwright, novelist, and screenwriter
- Wang Fang (disambiguation)
- Yang Fang-wan, Taiwanese lawyer and politician
- Yutian Wanfang Airport, an airport in Yutian County, Hotan Prefecture, Xinjiang, China
