= Wang Fang =

Wang Fang may refer to:

- Wang Fang (politician) (1920–2009), former Minister of Public Security of China
- Wang Fang (basketball) (born 1967), Chinese former basketball player
- Wang Fang (synchronised swimmer) (born 1977), Chinese synchronised swimmer
- Wang Fang (athlete) (born 1983), Chinese paralympian
- Wang Fang (discus thrower) (born 2000), Chinese discus thrower
- Wang Fang (rower), Chinese rower
- Wang Fang (singer) (born 1985), Chinese singer
- Fang Fang (born 1955), real name Wang Fang, Chinese writer

== See also ==
- Wangfang, a town in Liling, Zhuzhou, Hunan, China
- Wanfang (disambiguation)
