= Yangsanshi =

Subdistrict in Liling City, Hunan, China

Yangsanshi (Chinese: 阳三石街道; pinyin: Yángsānshí Jiēdào) is a subdistrict of Liling City in Hunan Province, China. The subdistrict was established in 1985. As of 2015, the town had a population of 52,200 and an area of 37.23 square kilometers.
