= Pukou, Liling =

Town in Liling, Hunan, China

Coordinates: 27.7675°N 113.6360°E

Pukou Town (simplified Chinese: 浦口镇; traditional Chinese: 浦口鎮; pinyin: Pǔkǒu Zhèn) is an urban town in Liling City, Zhuzhou City, Hunan Province, People's Republic of China.

== Cityscape ==
The town is divided into 2 villages and 15 communities, the following areas: Daqiao Community, Guanshan Community, Baofeng Village, Sanpu Village, Lizhou Village, Tianfu Village, Rongping Village, Hequan Village, Shantang Village, Huajiao Village, Lengshui Village, Biquan Village, Guangu Village, Maoping Village, Xianshi Village, Dongfang Village, and Heshui Village.
