= Xianyueshan =

Xianyueshan Subdistrict 仙岳山街道
- Subdistrict
- Location in Hunan
- Coordinates: 27°38′36″N 113°30′41″E
- Country: People's Republic of China
- Province: Hunan
- Prefecture-level city: Zhuzhou
- County-level city: Liling

Area
  - Total: 38 km^{2} (15 sq mi)

Population
  - Total: 38,000
  - Density: 1,000/km^{2} (2,600/sq mi)
- Time zone: UTC+8 (China Standard)
- Postal code: 412200
- Area code: 0733

Xianyueshan (Chinese: 仙岳山街道; pinyin: Xiānyuèshān Jiēdào) is a subdistrict of Liling City in Hunan Province, China. The subdistrict was renamed as the present name from Xishan (西山) on November 26, 2015. At the 2000 census, it had a population of 38,000 and an area of 38 square kilometers.

== Cityscape ==
The township is divided into the following nine villages and four communities

- Nanmen Community (南门社区)
- Bishan Community (碧山社区)
- Shuyuan Community (书院社区)
- Caiyuanta Community (财源塔社区)
- Jiangyuan Village (江源村)
- Hexi Village (河西村)
- Bishanling Village (碧山岭村)
- Wanyi Village (万宜村)
- Shimenkou Village (石门口村)
- Shichengjin Village (石成金村)
- Wulidun Village (五里墩村)
- Dishuijing Village (滴水井村)
- Fengshutang Village (枫树塘村)
