= Shiting, Liling =

Urban town in Liling City, China

Coordinates: 27°37′38″N 113°15′06″E

Shiting Town (simplified Chinese: 石亭镇; traditional Chinese: 石亭鎮; pinyin: Shítíng Zhèn) is an urban town in Liling City, Zhuzhou City, Hunan Province, People's Republic of China.

== Administrative divisions ==
The town is divided into 12 villages and 1 community, which includes the following areas: Shiting community, Yonghong Village, Zhangshu Village, Changtang Village, Sujialong Village, Yutanzhou Village, Shitangling Village, Huaxi Village, Niehu Village, Miaoquan Village, Shangbao Village, Changling Village, and Gaochong Village (石亭社区、永红村、樟树村、长塘村、苏家垅村、渔潭洲村、石塘岭村、花溪村、聂湖村、妙泉村、上保村、长岭村、高冲村).
