= Guoci =

Subdistrict in Liling City, Hunan, China

Coordinates: 27.6711°N 113.4858°E

Guoci (Chinese: 国瓷街道; pinyin: guó-cí jiēdào) is a subdistrict of Liling City in Hunan Province, China. The subdistrict was renamed as the present name from Huangni'ao (黄泥坳) on November 26, 2015. As of the 2000 census it had a population of 50,000 and an area of 33.8 square kilometers.

== Cityscape ==
The township is divided into 5 villages and 4 communities, which include the following areas: Jiangwan Community, Chedunqiao Community, Guoguang Community, Bali'an Community, Wulipai Village, Laolongjing Village, Shiziling Village, Jiangcun Village, and Wuhuamiao Village.
