= Chairman Mao Goes to Anyuan =

1967 painting by Liu Chunhua

Chairman Mao en Route to Anyuan

Chairman Mao Goes to Anyuan is a 1967 oil painting by Liu Chunhua. It pictures a young Mao Zedong on the way to Anyuan to help rally miners and rail workers in the 1922 Anyuan Miners' strike.

It became an iconic visual art work of the Cultural Revolution, and was widely re-produced in media including posters, postage stamps, embroidery, and Mao buttons.

== Function ==
This artwork served as propaganda during the Cultural Revolution (1966–1976). During the earlier years of the Cultural Revolution, Liu Chunhua turned to socialist realism for creating portraits of Mao Zedong. This method allowed for intelligible subjects and emotionally moving themes that targeted the working class. Chairman Mao aimed to regain his hold after political struggles within his party, and this work focused on the concern of Chairman Mao and the communist party as a way to show the people his goals.

Jiang Qing heavily promoted the painting during the Cultural Revolution, describing it as a revolutionary masterpiece akin to the model revolutionary operas.

== Context ==
The painting depicts Mao at age 27, marching towards Anyuan to help rally miners and rail workers in the 1922 Anyuan Miners' Strike. He is dressed in a scholar's gown and holds a Hunan oiled-paper umbrella.

This event was a defining moment for the Chinese Communist Party because the miners represented the suffering masses that were the focus of the revolution. After the nonviolent strike of thirteen thousand workers, a majority of the miners enlisted as soldiers in the Red Army to support Mao and the Revolution. Nearly half a century later Mao was stuck attempting to correct political fallout from the disasters of the 1950s, including the Great Leap Forward of 1958–1962. The Great Leap Forward was an attempt to modernize China and transform it from an agrarian economy to an industrialized, socialist society. His party had to reinvigorate communist ideology as a whole. For many years, Mao led China through a time of violent class struggles against traditional customs and capitalism.

Speaking about his work years later, Liu stated:

I painted this work in 1967, the second year of the Great Cultural Revolution. The political background of that time was largely defined by the campaign to criticize Liu Shaoqi. Many people were aware that Liu Shaoqi had led workers' strikes in Anyuan. But a group of young teachers and students at universities in the capital who had conducted in-depth research on party history had a more complete understanding of the period, and in their opinion the true leader of the Anyuan Workers Movement was Chairman Mao - prior to the Cultural Revolution, most reports mentioned only Liu Shaoqi. This group felt that Chairman Mao's [role] in the revolutionary movements at Anyuan should be positively portrayed and disseminated, with the ultimate aim of criticizing Liu Shaoqi. They planned to organize an exhibition [entitled] "Mao Zedong's Thought Illuminates the Anyuan Workers' Movement."

== Artistic decision making ==
Liu's style for painting the piece reflects his inspiration from the works of the Italian Renaissance painter Raphael.

The painting is 2.2 meters high and 1.8 meters wide.

In order for Liu Chunhua to create this artwork he studied old photographs and interviewed workers from Anyuan to ensure visual accuracy. He chose to place Mao in traditional Chinese dress opposed to common wear, as this was normal in portraits of him during the Cultural Revolution. An unusual aspect of Chunhua's work is the cool color tones he uses. Warm tones and vibrant red accents were often used in his paintings, however in order to emphasize Mao's determination he chose to use deep blue and purple accents. Chunhua's alterations of the traditional Chinese landscape suggests that he was fully capable of leading the country and that he was almost above the world while still remaining practical.

== Liu Chunhua ==
Liu Chunhua was born in Tailai, Heilongjiang Province in 1944. He spent a majority of his childhood focused on art. He attended the Lu Xun Art Academy.

Chairman Mao goes to Anyuan was Lin's first oil painting commission.

In 1963 he entered the Central Academy of Fine Arts where he painted Chairman Mao en route to Anyuan, which has now been reproduced over 900 million times. After his graduation he worked as an editor at the Beijing Publishing House before he joined the Beijing Academy.

== Legacy ==
The painting was one of the most iconic visual arts of the Cultural Revolution. As academic Elizabeth Perry writes, the painting was widely available in forms "from Mao buttons and postage stamps to embroidery and pottery renditions ... with more than 900 million poster copies in circulation at one time."

Although Mao appreciated the "simplicity and grandeur" of the painting, he disapproved of it because it did not depict any workers.

In November 1969 a copy of Chairman Mao en route to Anyuan, painted by the Italian painter Luigi Carnevali, was hung in the Vatican Press Room in Rome. The image of Mao Zedong had been confused with a missionary priest. Once the error was understood, the picture was removed.

In 1988, the painting was declared a cultural relic.
