= Sunjiawan, Liling =

Rural township in Liling, Hunan, China

Coordinates: 27°34′19″N 113°30′10″E

Sunjiawan Township (simplified Chinese: 孙家湾乡; traditional Chinese: 孫家灣鄉; pinyin: Sūnjiāwān Xiāng) is a rural township in Liling City, Zhuzhou City, Hunan Province, People's Republic of China.

== Administrative divisions ==
The township is divided into 6 villages, which include the following areas: Lijiashan Village, Sunjiawan Village, Xi'an Village, Longhuwan Village, Wenjiawan Village, and Guanqian Village (李家山村、孙家湾村、西岸村、龙虎湾村、文家湾村、观前村).
