= Zhang Yousong =

Chinese translator

- 张友松
- Born: Zhang Peng (张鹏); 1903; Liling, Hunan, China
- Died: 1995 (aged 91–92); Chengdu, Sichuan, China
- Education: Peking University
- Occupation: Translator
- Children: 1
- Writing career
- Pen name: Chang Jian (常健); Zhang He (张鹤)
- Language: Chinese, English
- Period: 1930–1990
- Notable works: Adventures of Huckleberry Finn; The Adventures of Tom Sawyer

Zhang Yousong (simplified Chinese: 张友松; traditional Chinese: 張友松; pinyin: Zhāng Yǒusōng; 1903 – 1995) was a Chinese translator. He is a translator in China who translated the works of Mark Twain's into Chinese language.

== Biography ==
Zhang was born in Liling, Hunan in 1903. At the age of 12, Zhang moved to Beijing with his sister. Zhang is a graduate of Peking University. After graduation, he taught in Qingdao, Jinan, Changsha, and Hengyang. Zhang made the acquaintance of Lu Xun when he worked in Beixin Book Company (Chinese: 北新书局). During the Second Sino-Japanese War (1937-1945), Zhang founded the Chenguang Book Company (Chinese: 晨光书局) and Chunchao Book Company (Chinese: 春潮书局).

In 1951, after the founding of the PRC, Zhang returned to Beijing, then he worked in the People's Literature Publishing House.

In 1966, the Cultural Revolution was launched by Mao Zedong, Zhang suffered political persecution and experienced mistreatment, Red Guards of the Cultural Revolution attacked him as a counter-revolutionary, they struck him, and he was blinded in his right eye.

In 1984, Zhang settled in Chengdu, Sichuan. In his later years, he had been worn down by poverty and illness, he died in 1995.

== Personal life ==
Zhang had one son and one daughter, his son died at an early age.

== Works ==
=== Translations ===
- Immensee (Theodor Storm) (Chinese: 茵梦湖)
- Adventures of Huckleberry Finn (Chinese: 哈克贝利·费恩历险记)
- The Adventures of Tom Sawyer (Chinese: 汤姆·索亚历险记)
- Treasure Island (Robert Louis Stevenson) (Chinese: 荒岛探宝记/金银岛)
