= Hejiaqiao, Liling =

Town in Liling, Hunan, China

Coordinates: 27.4199°N 113.3484°E

Hejiaqiao Town (simplified Chinese: 贺家桥镇; traditional Chinese: 賀家橋鎮; pinyin: Hèjiāqiáo Zhèn), is an urban town in Liling City, Zhuzhou City, Hunan Province, People's Republic of China.

== Cityscape ==
The town is divided into 9 villages and 2 communities, the following areas: Yunyan Community, Mingyue Community, Xintai Village, Qixing Village, Heshi Village, Huma Village, Miaoquan Village, Hongluo Village, Sichong Village, Shuikoushan Village, and Dangzaishan Village.
