= Wangfang =

Wangfang Town
- Town

Chinese transcription(s)
  - Simplified: 王坊镇
  - Traditional: 王坊鎮
  - Pinyin: Wángfǎng Zhèn
- Location in China
- Coordinates: 27°44′24″N 113°38′54″E
- Country: People's Republic of China
- Province: Hunan
- City: Zhuzhou
- County-level city: Liling

Area
  - Total: 40 km^{2} (15 sq mi)

Population
  - Total: 24,000
  - Density: 600/km^{2} (1,600/sq mi)
- Time zone: UTC+8 (China Standard)
- Area code: 0733

Wangfang Town (simplified Chinese: 王坊镇; traditional Chinese: 王坊鎮; pinyin: Wángfǎng Zhèn) is an urban town in Liling, Zhuzhou, Hunan Province, People's Republic of China.

== Cityscape ==
The town is divided into 10 villages and 2 communities, the following areas: Qiaotou Community, Sanjiaoping Community, Lianmeng Village, Wangfang Village, Hehualong Village, Guanchong Village, Wenquan Village, Shishan Village, Banchuan Village, Daping Village, Yanglin Village, and Lushi Village (桥头社区、三角坪社区、联盟村、王坊村、荷花垅村、灌冲村、温泉村、石山村、泮川村、大屏村、杨林村、渌石村).
