= Fenglinshi, Liling =

Town in Liling, Hunan, China

Coordinates: 27.8337°N 113.4138°E

Fenglinshi Township (simplified Chinese: 枫林市乡; traditional Chinese: 楓林市鄉; pinyin: Fenglinshi Xiang), is a rural township in Liling City, Zhuzhou City, Hunan Province, People's Republic of China.

== Cityscape ==
The township is divided into nine villages, the following areas: Tangjia'ao Village, Wushi Village, Fenglinshi Village, Baimeichong Village, Majiachong Village, Huang Village, Jiangjiaqiao Village, Xiaojiachong Village, and Taiyangqiao Village.
