= Jiashu, Liling =

Town in Liling, Hunan, China

Coordinates: 27.5556°N 113.4245°E

Jiashu Township (simplified Chinese: 嘉树乡; traditional Chinese: 嘉樹鄉; pinyin: Jiāshù Xiāng) is a rural township in Liling City, Zhuzhou City, Hunan Province, China.

== Cityscape ==
The township is divided into 12 villages, the following areas: Shanxian Village, Fenglin Village, Jiashu Village, Jinglin Village, Wushi Village, Yucha Village, Heshu Village, Lidu Village, Luoru Village, Shenquan Village, Jingchong Village, and Xindatang Village.
