= Shenfugang, Liling =

Town in Liling, Hunan, China

Coordinates: 27.6315°N 113.3356°E

Shenfugang Town (simplified Chinese: 神福港镇; traditional Chinese: 神福港鎮; pinyin: Shenfugang Zhen), is an urban town in Liling City, Zhuzhou City, Hunan Province, People's Republic of China.

== Cityscape ==
The town is divided into 9 villages and 2 communities, the following areas: Changshaling Community, Shenfugang Community, Tiehekou Village, Fengshushan Village, Tangjiaping Village, Xitangping Village, Daxilong Village, Xiaoxi Village, Longhu Village, Xiasanzhou Village, and Zhuanbu Village.
