= Guanzhuang, Liling =

Town in Liling, Hunan, China

Guanzhuang Township (simplified Chinese: 官庄乡; traditional Chinese: 官莊鄉; pinyin: Guānzhuāng Xiāng) is a rural township in Liling City, Zhuzhou City, Hunan Province, People's Republic of China. It is located at 27.8750°N 113.4221°E.

== Cityscape ==
The township is divided into 14 villages, the following areas: Changlian Village, Xinqiao Village, Ejin Village, Xiaoheng Village, Lichuan Village, Taohua Village, Xiaoyangkeng Village, Dayangkeng Village, Tantang Village, Dakouping Village, Waziping Village, Banbianshan Village, Daba Village, and Dahengjiang Village.
