= Xinyang, Liling =

Xinyang Township
- Township

Chinese transcription(s)
  - Simplified: 新阳乡
  - Traditional: 新陽鄉
  - Pinyin: Xinyang Xiang
- Location in China
- Coordinates: 27°40′35″N 113°21′55″E
- Country: People's Republic of China
- Province: Hunan
- City: Zhuzhou
- County-level city: Liling

Area
  - Total: 63.8 km^{2} (24.6 sq mi)

Population
  - Total: 24,000
  - Density: 380/km^{2} (970/sq mi)
- Time zone: UTC+8 (China Standard)
- Area code: 0733

Xinyang Township (simplified Chinese: 新阳乡; traditional Chinese: 新陽鄉; pinyin: Xinyang Xiang) is a rural township in Liling City, Zhuzhou City, Hunan Province, People's Republic of China.

== Cityscape ==
The township is divided into ten villages, the following areas: Chenjiawan Community, Qingni Village, Yuliangqiao Village, Shiyang Village, Hutan Village, Huaqiao Village, Hetang Village, Nanzhushan Village, Xinyang Village, and Jiangjun Village (陈家湾村、青泥村、鱼梁桥村、石羊村、湖潭村、花桥村、荷塘村、楠竹山村、新阳村、将军村).
