= Sifen, Liling =

Town in Hunan, China

Sifen Town (simplified Chinese: 泗汾镇; traditional Chinese: 泗汾鎮; pinyin: Sìfén Zhèn) is an urban town in Liling City, Zhuzhou City, Hunan Province, People's Republic of China.

== Cityscape ==
The town is divided into 12 villages and 3 communities, which include the following areas: Chezhan Community, Nongchang Community, Lintian Community, Shiwan Village, Jianshang Village, Sifen Village, Chenjialong Village, Maotian Village, Jingtang Village, Futian Village, Chabutang Village, Shuangtang Village, Shihu Village, and Hejialong Village (车站社区、农场社区、林田社区、石湾村、枧上村、泗汾村、陈家垅村、茂田村、经塘村、符田村、淇田村、茶埠塘村、双塘村、石虎村、荷家垅村).
