= Qingshuijiang, Liling =

Rural township in China

Coordinates: 27.4710°N 113.5550°E

Qingshuijiang Township (simplified Chinese: 清水江乡; traditional Chinese: 清水江鄉; pinyin: Qingshuijiang Xiang), is a rural township in Liling City, Zhuzhou City, Hunan Province, People's Republic of China.

== Cityscape ==
The township is divided into 9 villages, the following areas: Wenshan Village, Zengjiatan Village, Guoqiangfu Village, Qingshuijiang Village, Yangmudang Village, Jing Village, Jiebei Village, Longtang Village, and Dongshan Village.
