= Fuli, Liling =

Chinese town

Coordinates: 27.8373°N 113.7101°E

Fuli Town (simplified Chinese: 富里镇; traditional Chinese: 富里鎮; pinyin: Fuli Zhen) is an urban town in Liling City, Zhuzhou City, Hunan Province, People's Republic of China.

== Cityscape ==
The town is divided into 10 villages and 1 community, the following areas: Haitang Community, Cheshang Village, Changqing Village, Tangfang Village, Haubu Village, Moshi Village, Shuangjiang Village, Fuli Village, Liqun Village, Hetian Village, and Baida Village.
