= Pingxiang =

Pingxiang 萍乡市 Pingsiang
- Prefecture-level city
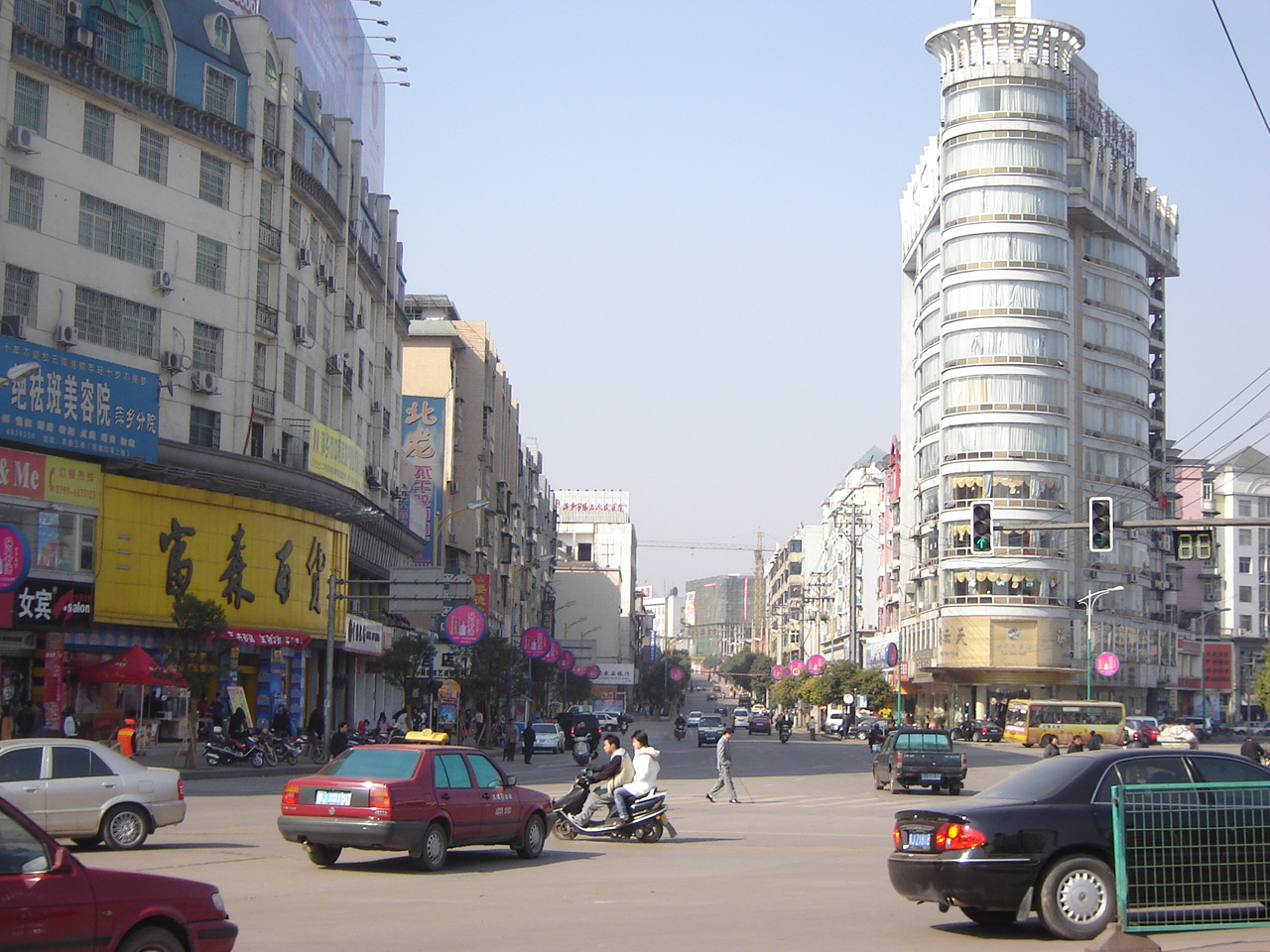
- Downtown Pingxiang

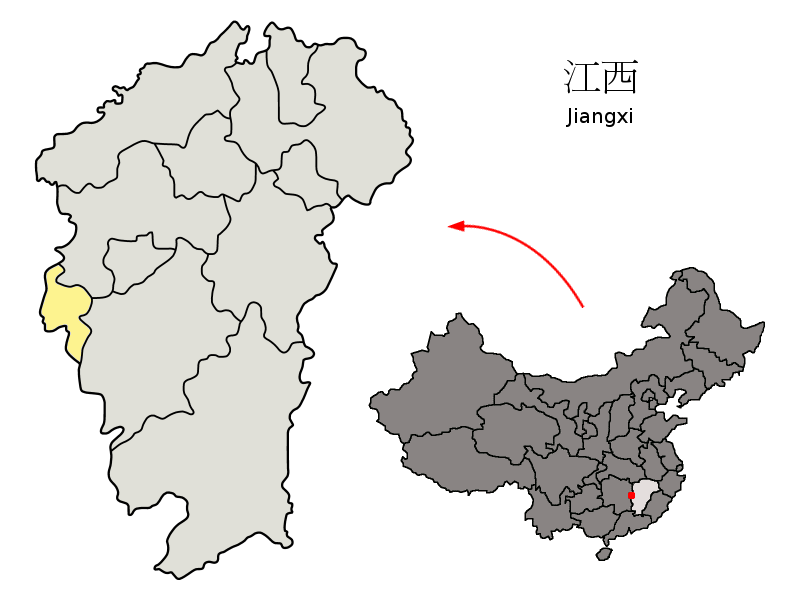
- Location of Pingxiang City jurisdiction in Jiangxi
- Coordinates (Pingxiang government): 27°39′32″N 113°53′13″E
- Country: People's Republic of China
- Province: Jiangxi
- Municipal seat: Anyuan District

Government
  - Mayor: Li Xiaobao

Area
  - Prefecture-level city: 3,824 km^{2} (1,476 sq mi)
  - Land: 3,824 km^{2} (1,476 sq mi)
  - Urban: 1,073 km^{2} (414 sq mi)
  - Metro: 1,073 km^{2} (414 sq mi)

Population (2020 census)
  - Prefecture-level city: 1,804,805
  - Density: 472.0/km^{2} (1,222/sq mi)
  - Urban: 857,716
  - Urban density: 799.4/km^{2} (2,070/sq mi)
  - Metro: 857,716
  - Metro density: 799.4/km^{2} (2,070/sq mi)

GDP
  - Prefecture-level city: CN¥ 91.2 billion US$ 14.6 billion
  - Per capita: CN¥ 48,133; US$ 7,728
- Time zone: UTC+8 (China Standard)
- Postal code: 337000
- Area code: 0799
- ISO 3166 code: CN-JX-03
- Website: www.pingxiang.gov.cn

Pingxiang (simplified Chinese: 萍乡; traditional Chinese: 萍鄉; pinyin: Píngxiāng; Wade–Giles: P'ing-hsiang) is a medium-sized prefecture-level city located in western Jiangxi province, People's Republic of China. Pingxiang City is located in the west of Jiangxi Province, bordering Yichun and Ji'an of this province to the east and south, and Zhuzhou and Changsha of Hunan to the northwest.

Pingxiang has a world-famous history and culture and various natural landscapes. There are a large number of old revolutionary sites such as Zongping Alley, the Anyuan Road Miners Club, the Anyuan Road Miners Consumer Cooperative, the Autumn Harvest Uprising military conference site, and the location of the Red Front Army Front Committee. Natural landscapes include Yilong Cave, Wugong Mountain, Yangqi Mountain, etc.

== Geography and climate ==
Pingxiang is located between 113°35′～114°17′ east longitude and 27°20′～28°0′ north latitude. Pingxiang City belongs to the hilly area south of the Yangtze River and is dominated by hilly landforms. Most of the east, south and north are mountainous, while the western part is low-lying. Mountains, hills and basins are intricately distributed within the territory, and the landform is relatively complex.

Pingxiang is a city situated near the border of Jiangxi with Hunan province. It is approximately 110 kilometers from Changsha, Hunan, and about 260 kilometers from Nanchang, the capital. Most of the area around the city is hilly and mountainous, although the city itself is relatively flat. As a subtropical monsoon climatic city, Pingxiang has mild winters, long and hot summers, with plenty of rainfall. The annual average temperature is 18 °C.The weather characteristics of the four seasons are as follows: spring is humid and mild, but the weather is changeable, sunny and rainy, and there is a saying that "there are no three sunny days in spring"; there are many showers or thunderstorms in summer; autumn is cool, dry, and less rainy; winter is cold and rainy (snow) weather.

Climate data for Pingxiang, elevation 118 m (387 ft), (1991–2020 normals, extremes 1981–2010)
Month	Jan	Feb	Mar	Apr	May	Jun	Jul	Aug	Sep	Oct	Nov	Dec	Year
Record high °C (°F)	25.8 (78.4)	30.5 (86.9)	35.0 (95.0)	35.7 (96.3)	37.3 (99.1)	37.6 (99.7)	40.1 (104.2)	41.0 (105.8)	39.2 (102.6)	35.9 (96.6)	31.8 (89.2)	25.5 (77.9)	41.0 (105.8)
Mean daily maximum °C (°F)	9.6 (49.3)	12.5 (54.5)	16.6 (61.9)	23.3 (73.9)	27.8 (82.0)	30.8 (87.4)	34.2 (93.6)	33.5 (92.3)	29.8 (85.6)	24.7 (76.5)	18.7 (65.7)	12.5 (54.5)	22.8 (73.1)
Daily mean °C (°F)	5.9 (42.6)	8.4 (47.1)	12.2 (54.0)	18.2 (64.8)	22.9 (73.2)	26.2 (79.2)	29.1 (84.4)	28.4 (83.1)	24.8 (76.6)	19.5 (67.1)	13.7 (56.7)	8.1 (46.6)	18.1 (64.6)
Mean daily minimum °C (°F)	3.4 (38.1)	5.6 (42.1)	9.2 (48.6)	14.7 (58.5)	19.2 (66.6)	22.8 (73.0)	25.2 (77.4)	24.8 (76.6)	21.2 (70.2)	15.8 (60.4)	10.1 (50.2)	5.0 (41.0)	14.8 (58.6)
Record low °C (°F)	−3.9 (25.0)	−3.9 (25.0)	−1.7 (28.9)	1.5 (34.7)	9.0 (48.2)	13.4 (56.1)	17.4 (63.3)	18.1 (64.6)	12.6 (54.7)	2.7 (36.9)	−1.1 (30.0)	−9.3 (15.3)	−9.3 (15.3)
Average precipitation mm (inches)	85.6 (3.37)	95.6 (3.76)	193.3 (7.61)	187.6 (7.39)	231.5 (9.11)	252.4 (9.94)	189.8 (7.47)	135.5 (5.33)	84.3 (3.32)	63.0 (2.48)	100.1 (3.94)	70.7 (2.78)	1,689.4 (66.5)
Average precipitation days (≥ 0.1 mm)	14.7	15.0	19.7	17.2	17.2	16.6	11.3	11.0	10.1	10.6	12.9	12.4	168.7
Average snowy days	2.0	1.8	0	0	0	0	0	0	0	0	0	0.4	4.2
Average relative humidity (%)	82	82	83	81	81	82	76	78	79	77	79	79	80
Mean monthly sunshine hours	56.6	64.7	79.6	111.3	122.8	134.1	226.3	217.1	151.4	134.3	101.3	93.8	1,493.3
Percentage possible sunshine	17	20	21	29	29	32	54	54	41	38	32	29	33
Source: China Meteorological Administration

== History ==
Archaeological evidence suggests that Pingxiang was first settled during the Stone Age. During the Han dynasty, it was part of Yichun. In 267, during the time of the Three Kingdoms, it became Pingxiang County, which made it a higher level of administration than what it is today. During the Tang dynasty (618–907), it was part of the Jiangnanxi Circuit, and was called Yuanzhou. During the Ming and Qing Dynasties, Pingxiang became a famous cultural center and produced many literati and historical celebrities, such as the famous poet Tao Yuanming. Its name and area of administration were changed many times until 1970, when it assumed its present form.

== Administration ==
Pingxiang has direct jurisdiction over two urban districts, one economic development area, three counties, 28 towns, 18 townships, and 7 sub-districts.

Urban districts:

- Anyuan District (安源区)
- Xiangdong District (湘东区)
- Anyuan Economic Development Zone (安源经济开发区)

Counties:

- Shangli County (上栗县)
- Luxi County (芦溪县)
- Lianhua County (莲花县)

Map
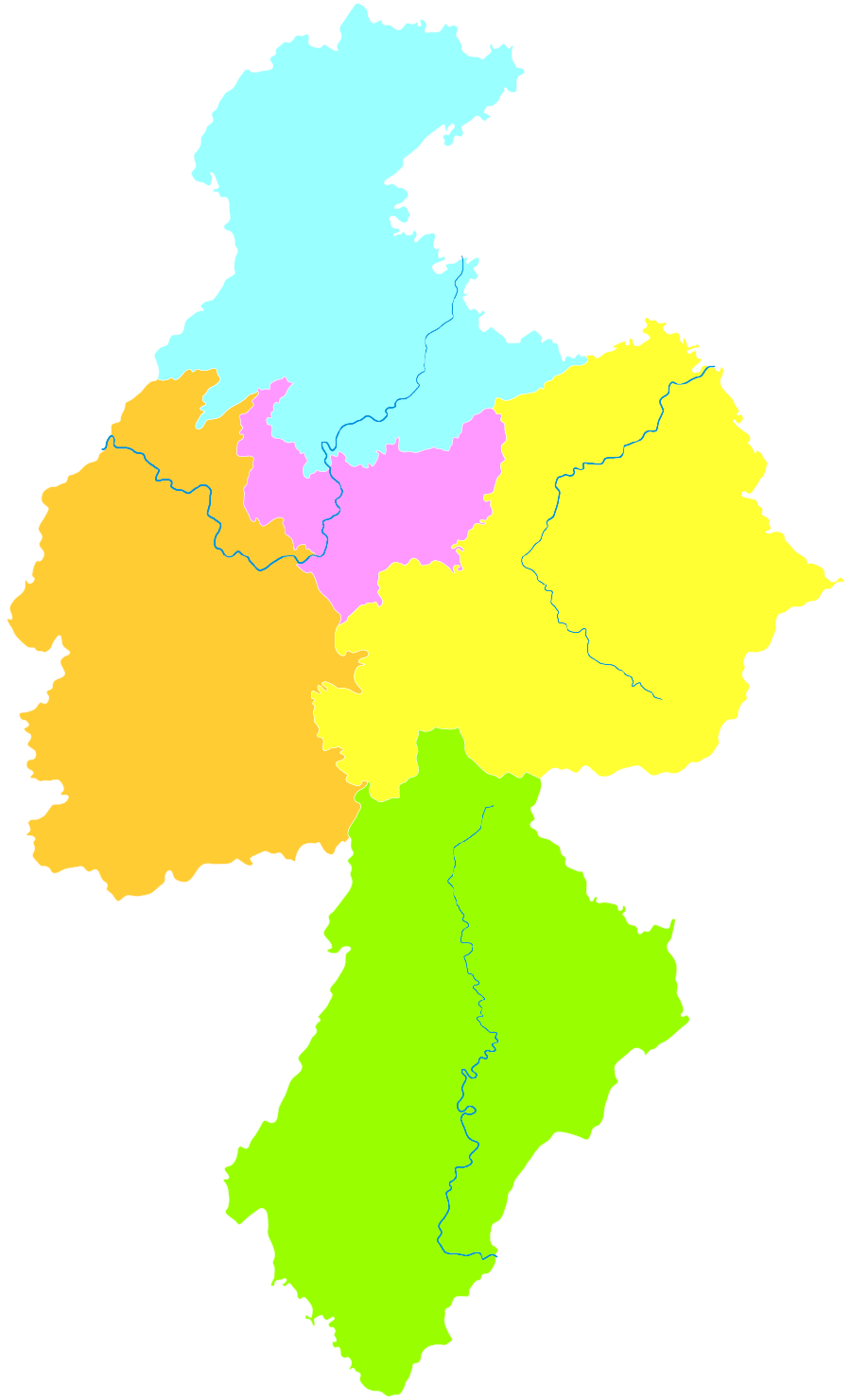

== Demographics ==
As of the 2020 Chinese census, its total population was 1,804,805 inhabitants, of whom 857,716 lived in the built-up areas (or metro), made of two urban districts.

At the end of 2023 and the beginning of 2024, Pingxiang City’s permanent population will be 1.8016 million.

== Economy ==
As of 2020, the GDP of Pingxiang was 96.360.2 billion RMB, a 3.6% growth over the previous year. Rural per capita disposable income was 20,831 RMB, a 4.9% growth over 2019, and urban per capita disposable income was 40,405 RMB, a 6.6% growth over 2019 (without regard to inflation).

== Resources ==
Pingxiang has abundant water and mineral resources. Five rivers flow across the land which delivers approximately 2.626 billion cubic meters per year. Coal, iron ore, limestone, kaolin, and granite are the most abundant minerals of the city. Even today, the Pingxiangren, or local people, proudly refer to their city as the "coal center of southern China."

== Transportation ==
Pingxiang is a regional hub for transportation. It is about 1.5 hrs drive to the CSX from downtown of Pingxiang. A couple of highways and the main rail line between Changsha and Nanchang run through the city. The city has had a high-speed railway since September 2014.

== Tourism ==
Wugong (also known as WooKong) mountain is a national well-known place for tourism. It lies in the east of Pingxiang, 45 minutes from downtown. The highest altitude is 1,918 meters while the average altitude is about 1,500 meters. Most of the landscape remains virginal despite some necessary infrastructure that benefit tourists.

Yangqi mountain is famous for the religion of Buddhism. It lies north of Pingxiang, one hour's drive from downtown.

Nielongdong (also known as Sinful Dragon Cave) has a tale which refers to Chinese traditional religion and zodiac. This beautiful area is only twenty minutes north.

The historical buildings of the Anyuan Miners' and Railroad Workers' Club as well as the Anyuan Miners' Strike Memorial Hall preserve the memory on the influence of the miners and railroad workers on the communist movement and are open for public visits.
