= Anyuan, Pingxiang =

Anyuan 安源区
- District
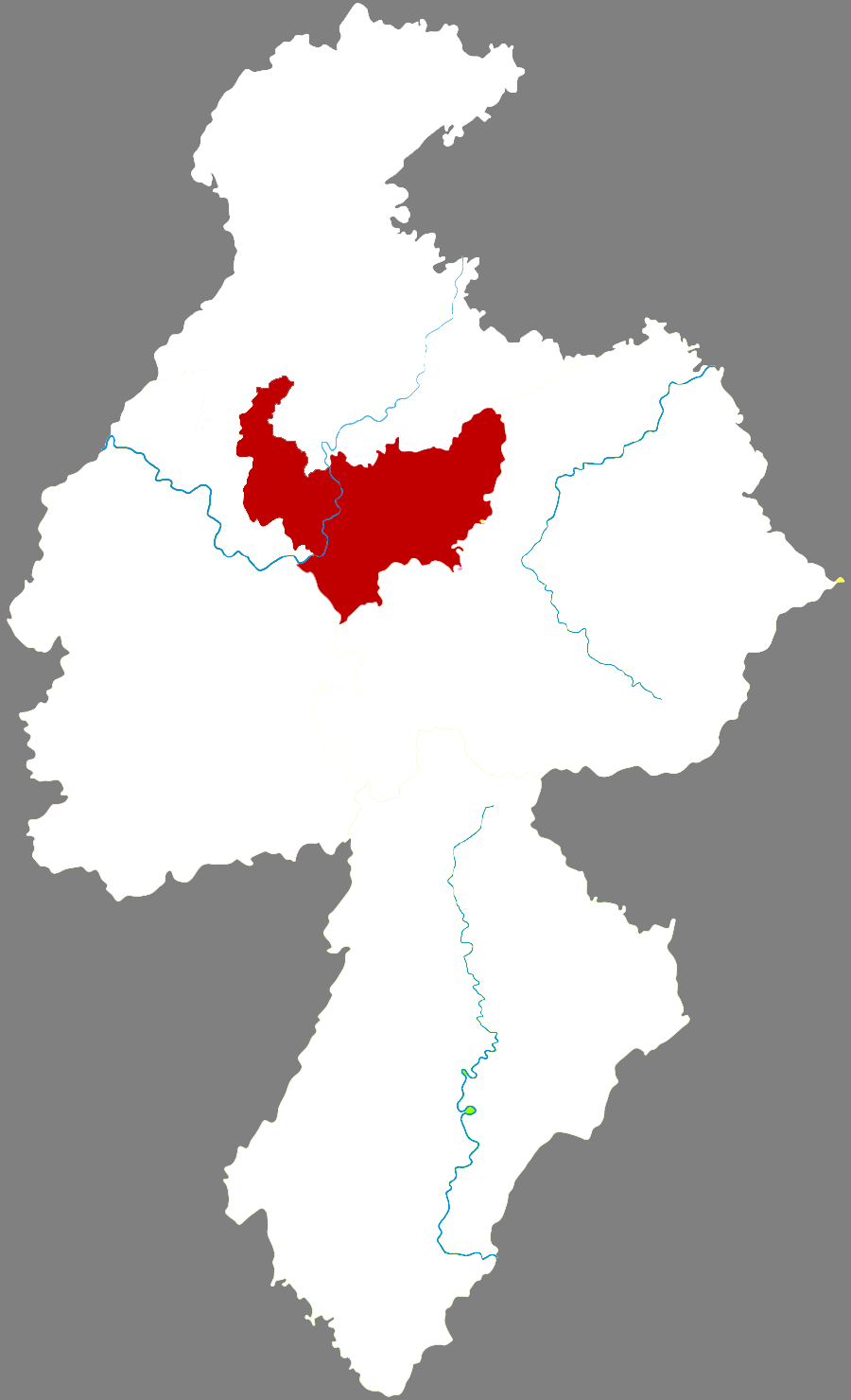
- Location in Pingxiang City

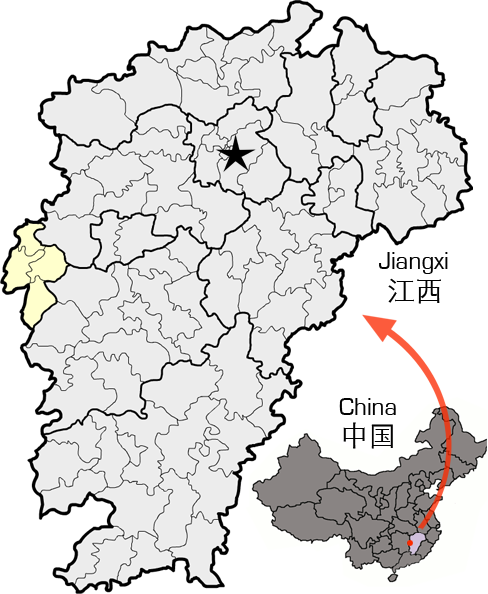
- Location of Pingxiang City in Jiangxi
- Coordinates (Anyuan District government): 27°36′54″N 113°52′15″E
- Country: People's Republic of China
- Province: Jiangxi
- Prefecture-level city: Pingxiang

Area
  - Total: 212 km^{2} (82 sq mi)

Population (2017)
  - Total: 383,400
  - Density: 1,810/km^{2} (4,680/sq mi)
- Time zone: UTC+8 (China Standard)
- Postal Code: 337000

Anyuan District (simplified Chinese: 安源区; traditional Chinese: 安源區; pinyin: Ānyuán Qū) is a district of the city of Pingxiang, Jiangxi province, People's Republic of China.

The famous Maoist propaganda painting Chairman Mao Goes to Anyuan is set in this location, depicting an occasion when the young Mao Zedong traveled to Anyuan to help lead a miners' strike. The 1962 painting "Comrade Liu Shaoqi and the Anyuan Miners" portrays the same strike.

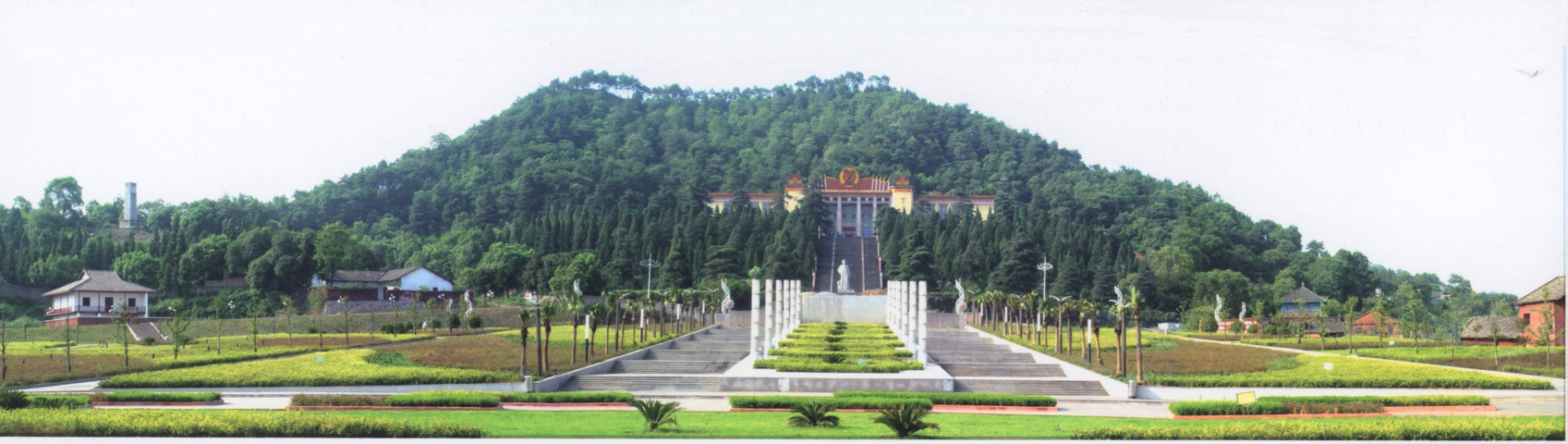
The memorial of Anyuan

== Administrative divisions ==
Anyuan District has 6 Subdistricts and 4 towns.

6 Subdistricts

- Dongdajie (东大街街道)
- Fenghuang (凤凰街街道)
- Bayi (八一街街道)
- Houbu (后埠街街道)
- Danjiang (丹江街街道)
- Baiyuan (白源街街道)

4 towns

- Anyuan (安源镇)
- Gaokeng (高坑镇)
- Wubei (五陂镇)
- Qingshan (青山镇)
