= Xiangdong, Pingxiang =

Xiangdong 湘东区
- District
- Interactive map of Xiangdong
- Coordinates: 27°38′24″N 113°43′59″E
- Country: People's Republic of China
- Province: Jiangxi
- Prefecture-level city: Pingxiang

Area
  - Total: 853.4 km^{2} (329.5 sq mi)

Population (2018)
  - Total: 371,800
  - Density: 435.7/km^{2} (1,128/sq mi)
- Time zone: UTC+8 (China Standard)
- Postal code: 337016

Xiangdong District (simplified Chinese: 湘东区; traditional Chinese: 湘東區; pinyin: Xiāngdōng Qū) is one of two districts of Pingxiang, Jiangxi province, China, bordering Hunan province to the west.

== Administrative divisions ==
Xiangdong District is divided to one subdistrict, eight towns and two townships.

The subdistrict is:

- Xiashankou (峡山口街道)

=== Towns ===
- Xiangdong (湘东镇)
- Heyao (荷尧镇)
- Laoguan (老关镇)
- Lashi (腊市镇)
- Xiabu (下埠镇)
- Paishang (排上镇)
- Dongqiao (东桥镇)
- Mashan (麻山镇)

=== Townships ===
- Guanghansai (广寒塞乡)
- Baizhu (白竺乡)
