= Shangli County =

Shangli County 上栗县
- County
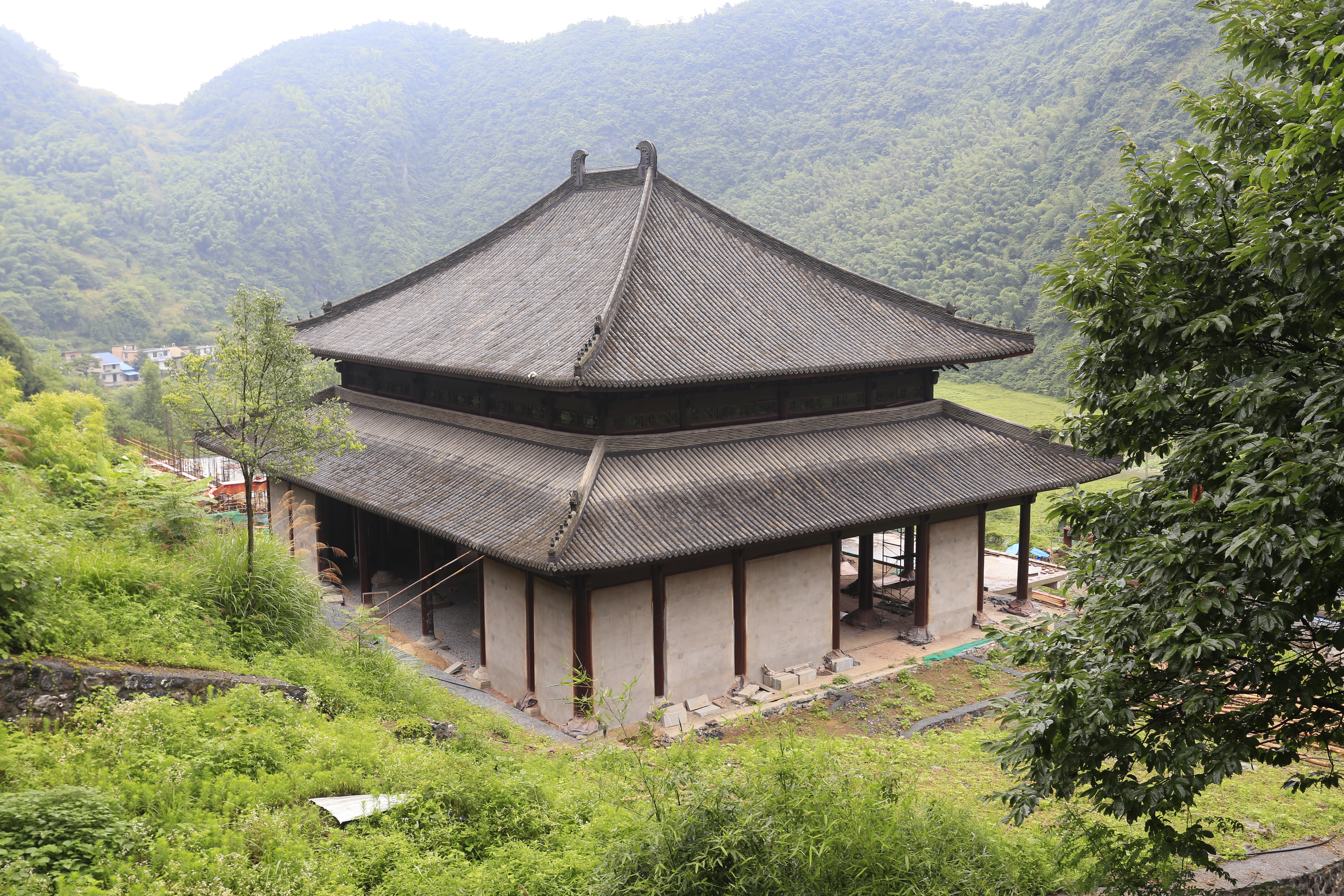
- Interactive map of Shangli County
- Coordinates: 27°52′48″N 113°47′42″E
- Country: People's Republic of China
- Province: Jiangxi
- Prefecture-level city: Pingxiang

Area
  - Total: 720.91 km^{2} (278.34 sq mi)

Population (2018)
  - Total: 522,200
  - Density: 724.4/km^{2} (1,876/sq mi)
- Time zone: UTC+8 (China Standard)
- Postal Code: 337009

Shangli County (simplified Chinese: 上栗县; traditional Chinese: 上栗縣; pinyin: Shànglì Xiàn) is a county in the west of Jiangxi province, China, bordering Hunan province to the west. It is under the jurisdiction of the prefecture-level city of Pingxiang.

== Administrative divisions ==
Shangli County has 6 towns and 3 townships.

6 towns

- Shangli (上栗镇)
- Tongmu (桐木镇)
- Jinshan (金山镇)
- Futian (福田镇)
- Penggao (彭高镇)
- Chishan (赤山镇)

3 townships

- Jiguanshan (鸡冠山乡)
- Changping (长平乡)
- Dongyuan (东源乡)

== Demographics ==
The population of the district was 457,586 in 1999.

== Climate ==
Climate data for Shangli, elevation 119 m (390 ft), (1991–2020 normals)
Month	Jan	Feb	Mar	Apr	May	Jun	Jul	Aug	Sep	Oct	Nov	Dec	Year
Mean daily maximum °C (°F)	10.1 (50.2)	12.6 (54.7)	17.6 (63.7)	24.0 (75.2)	27.8 (82.0)	30.8 (87.4)	34.1 (93.4)	34.2 (93.6)	30.1 (86.2)	24.9 (76.8)	18.8 (65.8)	12.3 (54.1)	23.1 (73.6)
Daily mean °C (°F)	6.3 (43.3)	8.3 (46.9)	12.8 (55.0)	18.4 (65.1)	22.8 (73.0)	26.2 (79.2)	29.0 (84.2)	28.7 (83.7)	24.8 (76.6)	19.5 (67.1)	14.0 (57.2)	7.8 (46.0)	18.2 (64.8)
Mean daily minimum °C (°F)	3.8 (38.8)	5.4 (41.7)	9.6 (49.3)	14.4 (57.9)	19.2 (66.6)	22.9 (73.2)	25.1 (77.2)	24.8 (76.6)	21.1 (70.0)	15.8 (60.4)	10.8 (51.4)	4.7 (40.5)	14.8 (58.6)
Average precipitation mm (inches)	77.9 (3.07)	95.9 (3.78)	178.7 (7.04)	162.6 (6.40)	220.9 (8.70)	282.9 (11.14)	196.4 (7.73)	114.9 (4.52)	93.8 (3.69)	50.0 (1.97)	117.0 (4.61)	67.9 (2.67)	1,658.9 (65.32)
Average precipitation days	14.7	15.0	19.7	17.2	17.2	16.6	11.3	11.0	10.1	10.6	12.9	12.4	168.7
Average snowy days	2.0	1.8	0	0	0	0	0	0	0	0	0	0.4	4.2
Average relative humidity (%)	80	80	82	78	79	80	75	75	78	78	81	79	79
Mean monthly sunshine hours	56.6	64.7	79.6	111.3	122.8	134.1	226.3	217.1	151.4	134.3	101.3	93.8	1,493.3
Percentage possible sunshine	17	20	21	29	29	32	54	54	41	38	32	29	33
Source: China Meteorological Administration
