= Pingle =

Pingle may refer to:

== People ==
- Charles Pingle (1880–1928), politician from Alberta, Canada
- Moropant Trimbak Pingle (died 1683), the first Peshwā in the court of Shivāji
- Vishnu Ganesh Pingle (1888–1915), Indian revolutionary and member of the Ghadar Party
- Bahiroji Pingale, a Peshwa of the Maratha Empire
- Nikhil Pingle, an Indian figure skater

== Places in China ==
- Pingle County (平乐县), of Guilin, Guangxi

=== Towns (平乐镇) ===
- Pingle, Henan, a town in Mengjin County, Henan
- Pingle, Luchuan County, a town in Guangxi
- Pingle, Pingle County, a town in Guangxi
- Pingle, Qionglai, Sichuan
- Pingle, Yanling, Hunan

== Others ==
- Banksia squarrosa, an Australian plant commonly known as Pingle
- The Pingle Academy, a state comprehensive school in South Derbyshire, England
- Pingle Cutting, a nature reserve north of Warboys in Cambridgeshire, England
