= Dongfeng, Yanling =

Dongfeng Township
- Township

Chinese transcription(s)
  - Simplified: 东风乡
  - Traditional: 東風鄉
  - Pinyin: Dongfeng Xiang
- Location in China
- Coordinates: 26°21′40″N 113°36′53″E
- Country: People's Republic of China
- Province: Hunan
- City: Zhuzhou
- County: Yanling County

Area
  - Total: 53.66 km^{2} (20.72 sq mi)

Population
  - Total: 8,900
  - Density: 170/km^{2} (430/sq mi)
- Time zone: UTC+8 (China Standard)
- Area code: 0733

Dongfeng (Chinese: 东风乡; pinyin: Dōngfēng Xiāng) is a historic township in the west of Yanling County, Hunan, China. As a historic division of Yanling, Dongfeng was historically a partition of Anren County, Caoping (草坪乡), Dapeng (大鹏乡) and Yuqiu (玉秋乡) three townships were divided into Lixian County (modern Yanling County) in 1954. The three townships were amalgamated to create Taiping Commune (太平公社) in 1958, Taiping Commune was renamed to Dongfeng Commune (东风公社) in 1969, Dongfeng Commune was reorganized as a township in 1984. On November 20, 2015, Dongfeng Township was merged to Luyuan Town. The county has 5 towns and 5 townships under its jurisdiction. The county seat is at Xiayang (霞阳镇).

== Subdivisions ==
The township is divided into 13 villages, which includes the following areas: Gaoshan Village, Gaofeng Village, Jinshan Village, Muxin Village, Taipingling Village, Dongxing Village, Xicaoping Village, Xinlong Village, Shangcun Village, Sankou Village, Hongxing Village, Hongguang Village, and Yanfen Village.
