= Longzha, Yanling =

Historic Yao ethnic township in Yanling, Hunan, China

Longzha Township
- Township

Chinese transcription(s)
  - Simplified: 龙渣瑶族乡
  - Traditional: 龍渣瑤族鄉
  - Pinyin: Lóngzhā Yáozú Xiān
- Location in China
- Coordinates: 26°08′54″N 113°46′29″E
- Country: People's Republic of China
- Province: Hunan
- City: Zhuzhou
- County: Yanling County

Area
  - Total: 98 km^{2} (38 sq mi)

Population (2,278)
  - Total: 2,241
  - Density: 23/km^{2} (59/sq mi)
- Time zone: UTC+8 (China Standard)
- Area code: 0733

Longzha (Chinese: 龙渣瑶族乡; pinyin: Lóngzhā Yáozú Xiāng) is a historic Yao ethnic township located in the extreme south of Yanling County, Hunan, China. As a historic division of Yanling, Longzha was originally a part of Dingzhi Township (定治乡) in 1949. Longzha Yao Ethnic Township was created in August 1958, it was reorganized as a production brigade of Longzha (龙渣大队) in Zhongcun Commune in 1958, and reorganized as a village of Longzha (龙渣村) in Zhongcun Township in 1984. Dividing four villages in southern Zhongcun Township, Longzha Yao Ethnic Township was re-established in February 1985. On November 20, 2015, With Zhongcun Township and Pingle Township, Longzha was merged to the new Zhongcun Yao Ethnic Township.
