= Shizhou =

Shizhou may refer to:

- Shizhou, Yanling (石洲), a town in Yanling County, Hunan, China
- Shizhou (in modern Shanxi) (石州), a former subdivision in modern Lüliang, Shanxi, China
- Shizhou (in modern Hubei) (施州), a former subdivision in modern Enshi Tujia and Miao Autonomous Prefecture and Yichang, Hubei, China
- Shizhou (in modern Yunnan) (施州), a former prefecture in modern Lijiang, Yunnan, China
- Shizhou (in modern Shaanxi) (石州), a former prefecture in modern Yulin, Shaanxi, China
- Shizhou (in modern Guangxi) (石州), a former subdivision in modern Wuzhou and Yulin, Guangxi, China
- Shizhou (in modern Sichuan) (石州), a former subdivision in modern Dazhou, Sichuan, China

== See also ==
- 石州 (disambiguation)
