= Sanhe, Yanling =

Sanhe Town
- Town

Chinese transcription(s)
  - Simplified: 三河镇
  - Traditional: 三河鎮
  - Pinyin: Sanhe Zhen
- Location in China
- Coordinates: 26°27′55″N 113°40′24″E
- Country: People's Republic of China
- Province: Hunan
- City: Zhuzhou
- County: Yanling County

Area
  - Total: 111.07 km^{2} (42.88 sq mi)

Population
  - Total: 18,700
  - Density: 168/km^{2} (436/sq mi)
- Time zone: UTC+8 (China Standard)
- Area code: 0733

Sanhe (Chinese: 三河镇; pinyin: Sānhé Zhèn) is a historic town located in the northern west of Yanling County, Hunan, China; it was merged to Xiayang Town in November 2015. The town had 17 villages under its jurisdiction with an area of 111.07 km^{2} (42.88 sq mi). As of the 2010 census, it had a population of 24,924, with its administrative centre at Hejia village (霍家).

== History ==
As a historic division of Yanling, Sanhe belonged to Kangle (康乐乡) and Zhongzheng (中正乡) townships in 1949, Hedong (河东乡) and Hemo (河漠乡) townships in 1956. Merging Hedong, Hemo and Hexi (河西乡) three townships created Sanhe Commune (三河公社) in 1958. A part of Sanhe was divided to Hexi Commune (the former Wangjiadu Town, modern Luyuan Town). Sanhe Commune was reorganized as a township in 1984, and a town in 1996. On November 20, 2015, Sanhe Town was merged to Xiayang Town.

== Subdivisions ==
It is divided into one community, Huojiaxu Community, and 11 villages: Xingguang Village, Taihe Village, Tuanxi Village, Xitai Village, Xiantianzhou Village, Tianping Village, Longkeng Village, Huojia Village, Miaoqian Village, Yuantou Village, and Dakeng Village.
