= Yonglejiang =

Town in Hunan, China

Coordinates: 26°42′50″N 113°16′00″E

Yonglejiang Town (Chinese: 永乐江镇; pinyin: Yǒnglèjiāng Zhèn) is a town and the county seat of Anren in Hunan, China. The town was formed through the amalgamation of Heshi Township (Chinese: 禾市乡), Paishan Township (Chinese: 排山乡), Junshan Township (Chinese: 军山乡), Qingxi Town (Chinese: 清溪镇) and Chengguan Town (Chinese: 城关镇) in 2012. Yonglejiang is located in the northern part of the county, it is bordered by Longshi Township (Chinese: 龙市乡), Dukou Township (Chinese: 牌楼乡), You County and Hengdong County to the north, Chaling County to the east, Pailou Township (Chinese: 牌楼乡) and Lingguan Town (Chinese: 灵官镇) to the south, Yangji Township (Chinese: 洋际乡), Leiyang City and Hengnan County to the west. It has an area of 358.74 km^{2} (138.51 sq mi) with a population of 134,400 (as of 2012), and its seat is at North Wuyi Rd. (Chinese: 五一北路)
