= Ankeng =

Ankeng (Chinese: 安坑; pinyin: Ānkēng) may refer to:

- Ankeng, Xindian District, New Taipei, Taiwan
- Ankeng Village (安坑村), Shizhou, Yanling, Hunan Province, China
- Ankeng light rail, a light rail transit (LRT) line in Xindian District, New Taipei City
