= Gaohu (disambiguation) =

The Gaohu (高胡) is a Chinese bowed string instrument developed from the erhu.

Gaohu (高湖镇) may also refer to the following towns in China:

- Gaohu, Hunan, in Hengdong County, Hunan
- Gaohu, Jiangxi, in Jing'an County, Jiangxi
- Gaohu, Zhejiang, in Qingtian County, Zhejiang
