= Zhongcun, Yanling =

Zhongcun Township 中村乡
- Township
- Location in Hunan
- Coordinates: 26°12′39″N 113°45′44″E
- Country: People's Republic of China
- Province: Hunan
- Prefecture-level city: Zhuzhou
- County: Yanling

Area
  - Total: 108 km^{2} (42 sq mi)

Population
  - Total: 7,627
  - Density: 70.6/km^{2} (183/sq mi)
- Time zone: UTC+8 (China Standard)
- Area code: 0733

Zhongcun (simplified Chinese: 中村乡; traditional Chinese: 中村鄉; pinyin: Zhōngcūn Xiāng) is a Yao ethnic township located in the south of Yanling County, Hunan, China. The township covers an area of 281 km^{2} (108 sq mi). As of the end of 2015, it had a population of 13,400. Its administrative centre is at the village of Zhongcun (中村).

== History ==
As a division of Yanling County, historically Zhongcun was part of the 3rd county-controlled district (第三区) in 1949, the 6th county controlled district (第六区) in 1952. The name of Zhongcun Township appeared in 1956. In 1958, Zhongcun Township was reorganized as a commune named Xingfu (幸福公社) and then renamed to Zhongcun Commune (中村公社), Longzha Yao Ethnic Township was merged to Zhongcun and reorganized as a production brigade of Longzha (龙渣大队). Zhongcun was reorganized as a township in 1984. Dividing four villages in southern Zhongcun Township, Longzha Yao Ethnic Township was re-established in February 1985. On November 20, 2015, merging Zhongcun Township, Longzha Yao Ethnic Township and Pingle Township, the new Zhongcun Yao Ethnic Township was created.

== Subdivisions ==
It is divided into 10 villages: Zhong Village, Longtan Village, Shendu Village, Luofujiang Village, Daoren Village, Lianxi Village, Longping Village, Xintian Village, Meigang Village, and Jiutan Village.
