= Xiannan =

Xiannan may refer to:

- Xiannan (憲南海山), seamount in the Zhongsha Islands
- Xiannan (仙南村), village in Tazhuang, Mishui, Hengdong, Hunan, China

== See also ==
- Xian'an District, Xianning, Hubei, China
- Xiaonan District, Xiaogan, Hubei, China
