= Tropical Storm Rumbia =

Pacific tropical storm in 2018

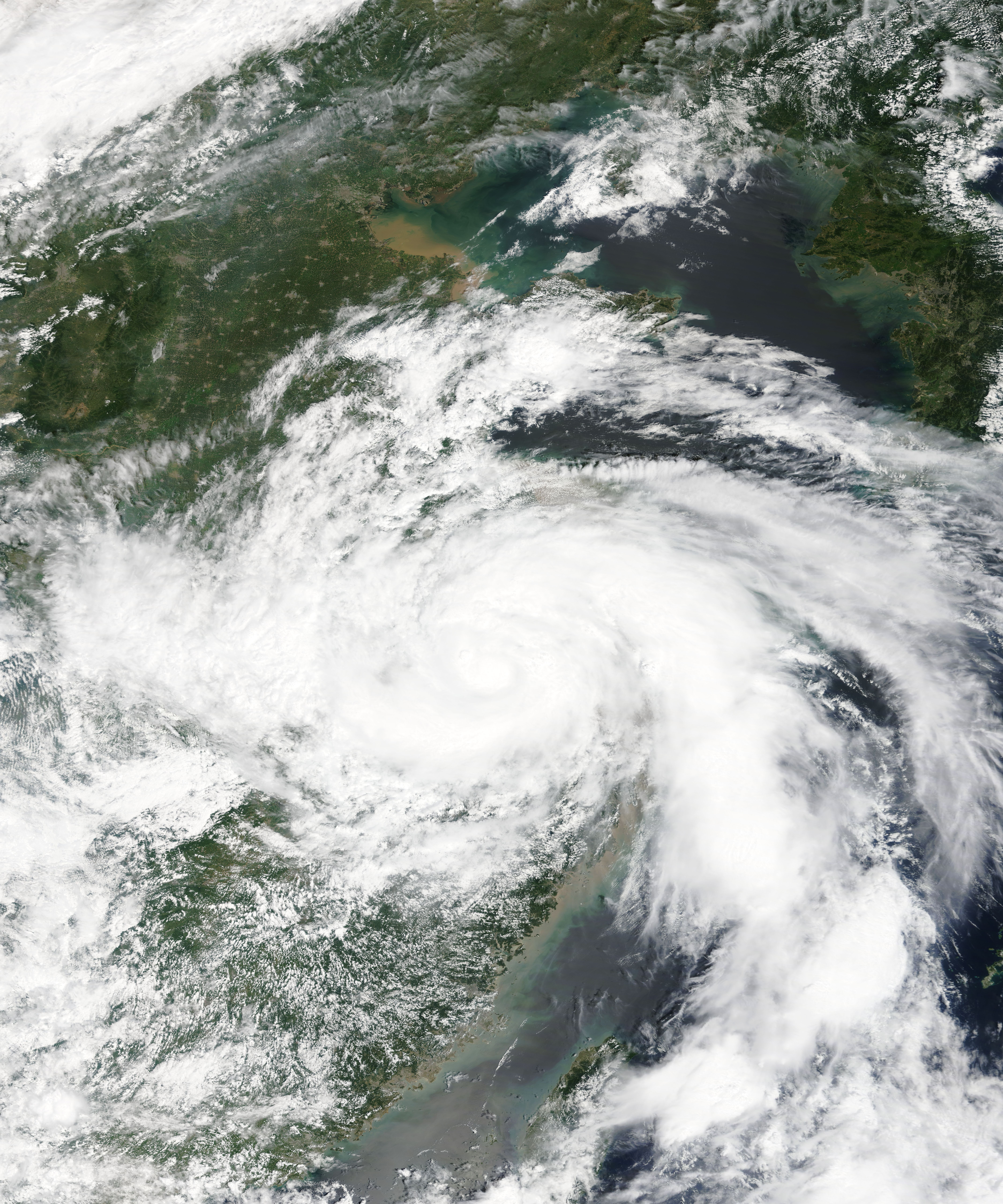
- Tropical Storm Rumbia at peak intensity over East China on August 17

Meteorological history
- Formed: August 15, 2018
- Dissipated: August 23, 2018

Tropical storm
- 10-minute sustained (JMA)
- Highest winds: 85 km/h (50 mph)
- Lowest pressure: 985 hPa (mbar); 29.09 inHg

Tropical storm
- 1-minute sustained (SSHWS/JTWC)
- Highest winds: 95 km/h (60 mph)
- Lowest pressure: 978 hPa (mbar); 28.88 inHg

Overall effects
- Fatalities: 53
- Damage: $5.36 billion (2018 USD)
- Areas affected: Ryukyu Islands, East China, Korean Peninsula
- IBTrACS
- Part of the 2018 Pacific typhoon season

Tropical Storm Rumbia (Note: The name Rumbia (Malay: rumbia, [rumbiə]) was contributed by Malaysia and means sago palm (Metroxylon sagu) in Malay.) was a moderate but very destructive tropical cyclone that caused widespread and disastrous flooding in East China in mid-August 2018. The twenty-second officially recognized tropical cyclone of the 2018 Pacific typhoon season, Rumbia developed from an area of low pressure that developed southeast of the Ryukyu Islands on August 13. Favorable environmental conditions supported development of the low into a tropical depression by August 15. At 12:00 UTC that day, the depression strengthened into Tropical Storm Rumbia. Initially moving northward, the cyclone turned westward in response to a building ridge to its northeast while slowly strengthening, reaching its peak intensity with maximum 10-minute sustained winds of 85 km/h (50 mph) on August 16. At 20:05 UTC that day, the storm made landfall in Shanghai at peak intensity, maintaining its strength as it moved inland due to ample environmental moisture. However, Rumbia began to weaken as it continued further inland, degenerating into a tropical depression on August 17 shortly before becoming extratropical over central China. The extratropical remnants of Rumbia accelerated northeastward into the Russian Far East, where they dissipated on August 23.

Rumbia, the third tropical cyclone to strike East China in 2018, succeeding tropical storms Ampil and Yagi, produced widespread heavy rainfall over regions already saturated by rains from the previous storms, causing flooding which claimed 53 lives and destroyed thousands of homes throughout the northeastern provinces of Anhui, Henan, Jiangsu, Shandong, and Xuzhou. Total economic losses from Tropical Storm Rumbia are estimated at ¥36.91 billion (US$5.36 billion).

== Meteorological history ==
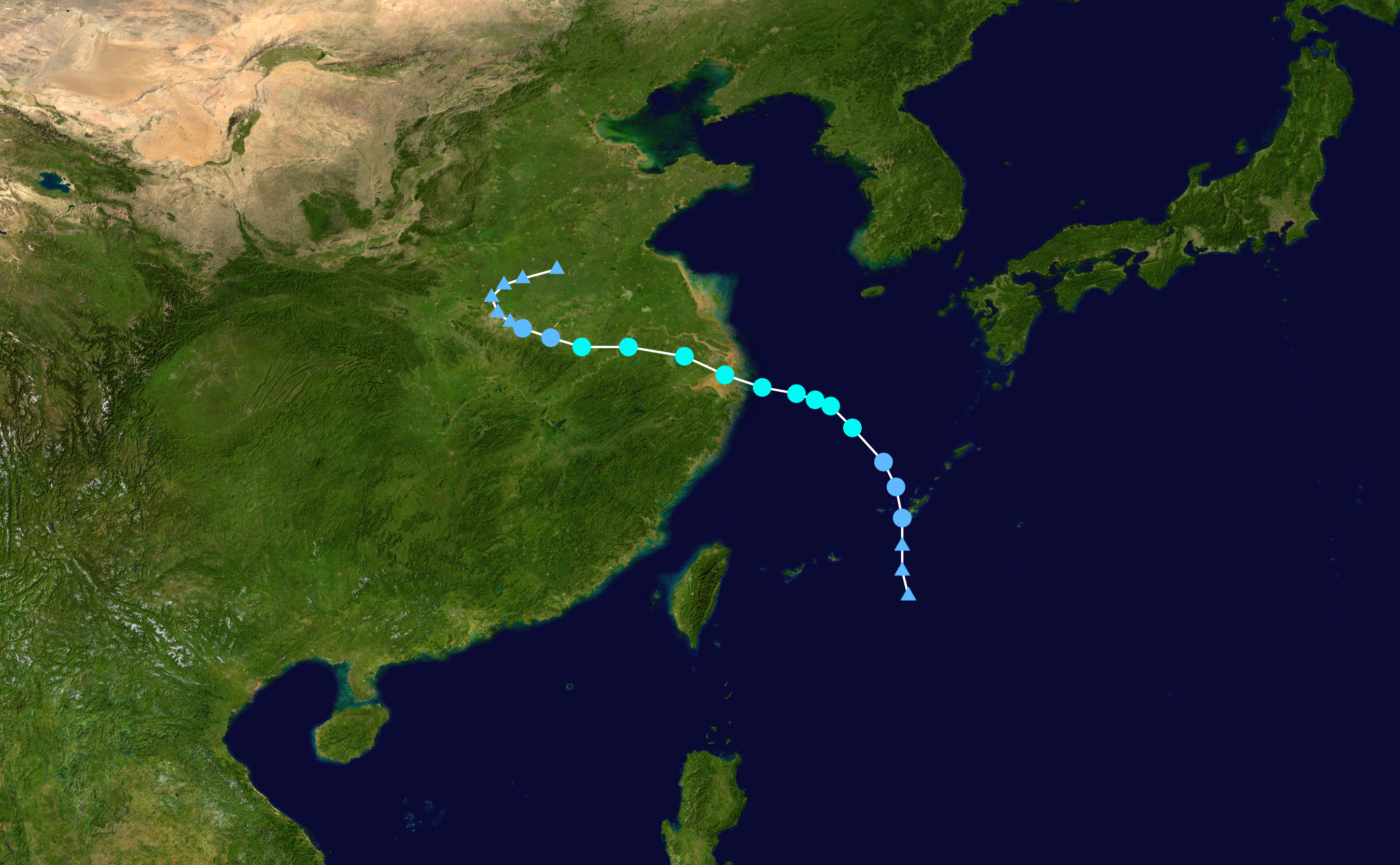
Map plotting the storm's track and intensity, according to the Saffir–Simpson scale Map key Saffir–Simpson scale Tropical depression (≤38 mph, ≤62 km/h) Tropical storm (39–73 mph, 63–118 km/h) Category 1 (74–95 mph, 119–153 km/h) Category 2 (96–110 mph, 154–177 km/h) Category 3 (111–129 mph, 178–208 km/h) Category 4 (130–156 mph, 209–251 km/h) Category 5 (≥157 mph, ≥252 km/h) Unknown Storm type Tropical cyclone Subtropical cyclone Extratropical cyclone, remnant low, tropical disturbance, or monsoon depression

On August 13, 2018, the Joint Typhoon Warning Center (JTWC) (Note: The Joint Typhoon Warning Center is a joint United States Navy – United States Air Force task force that issues tropical cyclone warnings for the western Pacific Ocean and other regions.) began monitoring a weak area of low pressure to the south-southeast of the Ryukyu Islands. Disorganized convection accompanied the low, primarily south of the circulation due to strong westerly flow. Environmental conditions consisting of low wind shear, high sea surface temperatures (averaging 28 to 29 °C (82 to 84 °F)), and an anticyclone aloft favored development of the low. At 06:00 UTC the next day, the Japan Meteorological Agency (JMA) (Note: The Japan Meteorological Agency is the official Regional Specialized Meteorological Center for the western Pacific Ocean.) classified the system as a tropical depression. Steady development took place throughout the day with convection blossoming near the elongated circulation center. Curved rain bands signified increasing organization and the JTWC issued a Tropical Cyclone Formation Alert later on August 14. Around 12:00 UTC, Kadena Air Force Base in Okinawa—roughly 80 km (50 mi) north of the system's estimated center—recorded sustained winds of 37 km/h (23 mph) and a pressure of 998 hPa (mbar; 29.47 inHg). The JMA subsequently analyzed the system as a tropical storm at 03:00 UTC on August 15—the eighteenth tropical storm of the season. Accordingly, the storm was assigned the name Rumbia. At the same time, the JTWC designated Rumbia as Tropical Depression 21W.

Throughout August 15, Rumbia moved slowly northwest in response to a subtropical ridge to the northeast. Intensification was slow to occur as convection remained disorganized, primarily active to the south and east of the center. Accordingly, the strongest winds were displaced well east of the center within this convection. The outlying convection remained strong due to ample upper-level outflow. An upper-level trough suppressed convection over and west of the center, leaving the circulation exposed. Early on August 16 Rumbia's trajectory shifted west-northwest, bringing the expected track toward Shanghai, China. The upper-level environment became more conducive to development throughout August 16, with improved outflow supporting development of convection over Rumbia's center. A nascent eye feature surrounded by deep convection became evident later that day, marking intensification of the system. Based on JMA analysis, Rumbia reached its peak intensity around 15:00 UTC just east of Shanghai with winds of 85 km/h (50 mph) and a pressure of 985 hPa (mbar; 29.09 inHg).

At 18:00 UTC on August 16, a ship near the mouth of Hangzhou Bay reported sustained winds of 78 km/h (48 mph) and a pressure of 986 hPa (mbar; 29.12 inHg) within the cyclone's center. Based on Dvorak satellite estimates ranging from T2.5 to T3.5 (indicating one-minute sustained winds of 65 to 100 km/h (40 to 65 mph)), the JTWC analyzed Rumbia to have achieved one-minute sustained winds of 100 km/h (60 mph) at this time. Shortly after reaching peak intensity over the Hangzhou Bay on August 16, Rumbia made landfall over Pudong New Area, Shanghai, China around 20:05 UTC, becoming the third tropical storm to hit the city in 2018. Despite moving over land, ample atmospheric moisture and low wind shear enabled Rumbia to maintain its strength as it progressed inland. Banding features maintained their structure through the first half of August 17.

== Preparations ==
In advance of the storm, meteorological agencies warned of heavy rains and the potential for flooding. Precipitation in Shandong was excepted to reach 40 to 70 mm (1.6 to 2.8 in). With reservoirs already at high capacity, officials coordinated discharges to alleviate the risk of flooding. However, as the storm moved through the region rainfall far exceeded forecasts, prompting emergency warnings on August 18 to all residents downstream along the Mi River.

Shanghai officials deployed 93,590 workers to quickly repair damaged infrastructure and placed an additional 127,031 rescuers on standby. Citywide, 60,182 people evacuated to designated shelters. Jinshan City Beach and Fengxian Bihai Sands were closed for the duration of the storm. Furthermore, approximately 12,000 billboard advertisements were reinforced and a further 14,000 dismantled.

Speed restrictions were implemented across roads in Jiangsu Province for high winds, with hundreds of personnel deployed to enforce them. Approximately 80,000 people were evacuated ahead of the storm.

== Effects in China ==
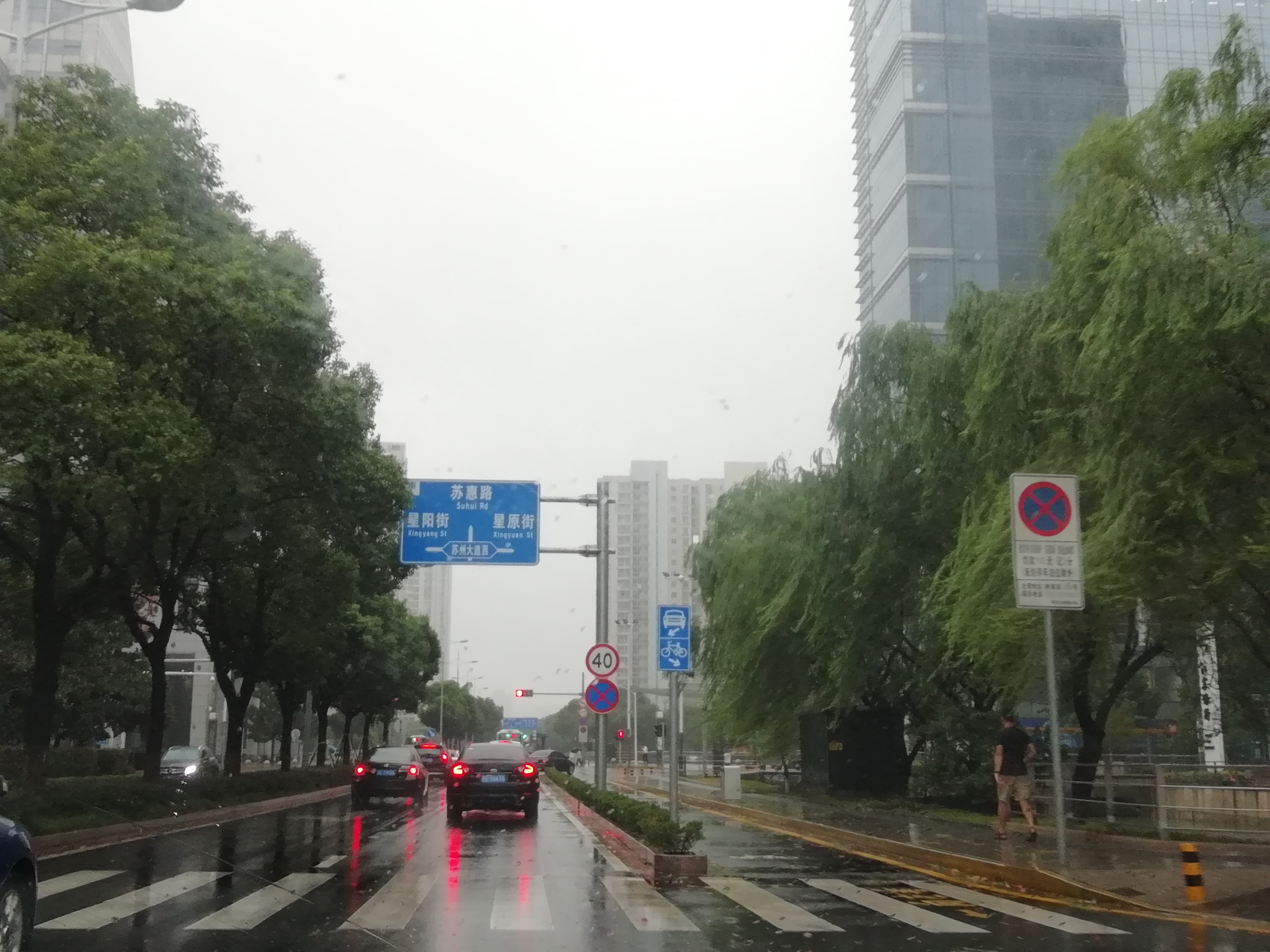
Conditions in Suzhou, Jiangsu, on August 17

In the weeks prior to Rumbia, the successive impacts of tropical storms Ampil and Yagi left the region saturated and unable to effectively absorb rain water. Furthermore, a subtropical ridge spread substantial heat and water vapor across Eastern China. This provided ample energy for the system to persist unusually far inland. Widespread torrential rains affected provinces unaccustomed to significant typhoon impacts: northern Anhui, Henan, Jiangsu, Shandong, and Xuzhou. The floods are considered the worst typhoon-related floods in the country since 2016. Throughout the affected areas, 53 people died in storm-related incidents. More than 32,246 homes were damaged or destroyed and total economic losses reached ¥36.91 billion (US$5.36 billion).

In Shanghai where the storm made landfall, a minor storm surge of 0.3 to 0.9 m (0.98 to 2.95 ft) impacted the coast. Rainfall peaked at 183 mm (7.2 in) in the Jiading District resulting in some flooding which affected three homes, twelve cars, and ninety-eight roads. Damage to power lines cut power to 40,000 people, primarily in the Chongming District.

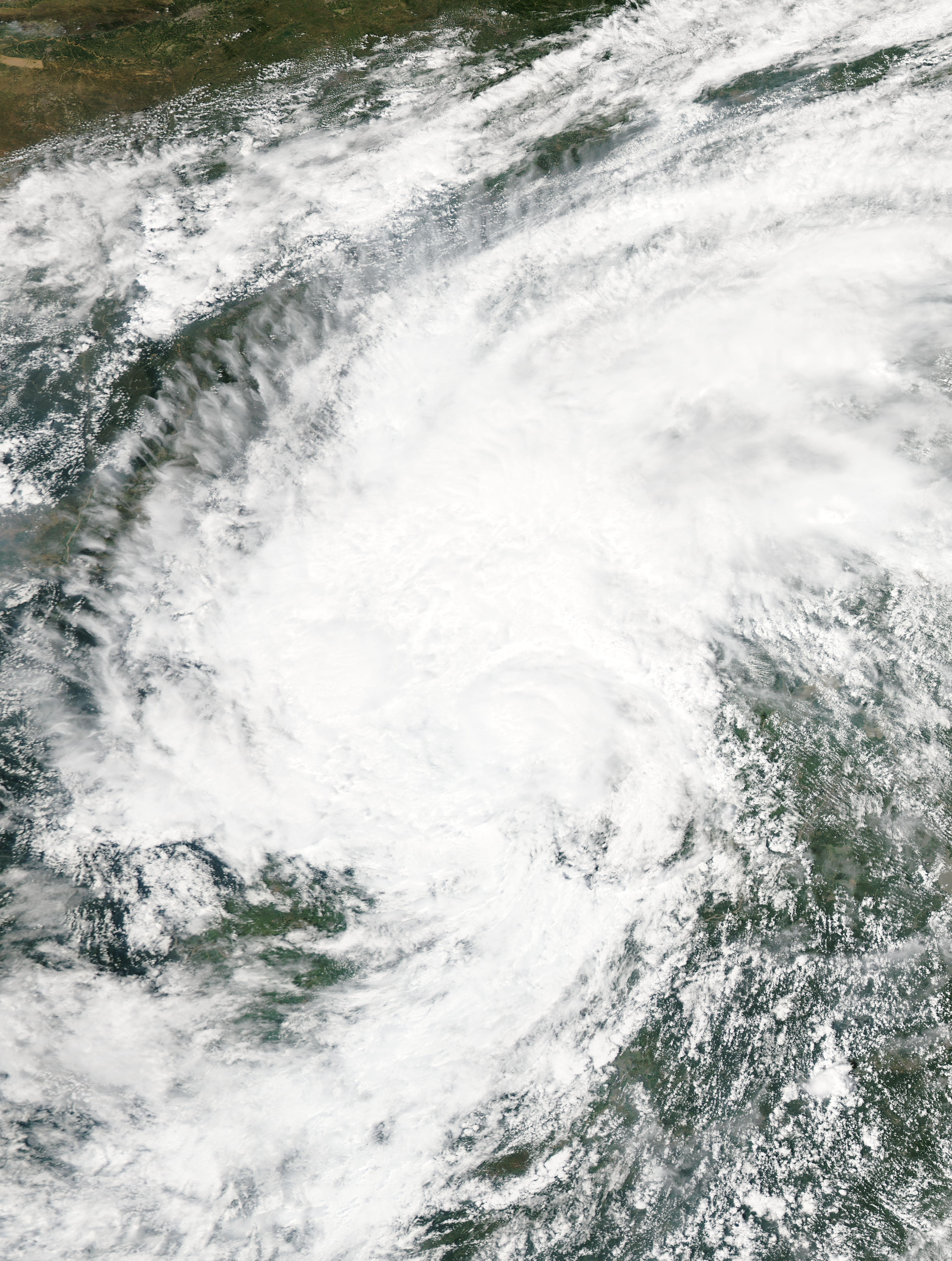
The remnants of the storm weakening over Henan on August 18

Multiple rivers and lakes in Jiangsu reached flood level due to the heavy rains, particularly Lake Tai, the Qinhuai River, and the Wei River. Rainfall between August 17 and 18 peaked at 332.8 mm (13.10 in) in Heqiao, Yixing. Storm- to typhoon-force winds battered coastal areas; a peak gust of 119 km/h (74 mph) on Gaogong Island in Lianyungang.

Record-breaking rains drenched much of Anhui Province; accumulations exceeded 50 mm (2.0 in) across 78.5 percent (109,600 km^{2}) of the province with localized areas exceeding 400 mm (16 in). The greatest precipitation fell in Xiaoxian County where 479.4 mm (18.87 in) was observed. All-time daily rainfall records were surpassed in Huaibei (269.2 mm (10.60 in)), Suzhou (232.6 mm (9.16 in)), and Fengyang (200.1 mm (7.88 in)). Similarly, rainfall rates approached historic levels for the region; one-hourly rainfall peaked at 124.5 mm (4.90 in) in Yanglouzhen. Although primarily a rain-event, Rumbia also brought strong winds that reached 119 km/h (74 mph) in Chaohu. Province-wide, 1.2 million people suffered direct effects from the storm with 30,000 people left homeless. Flooding destroyed 1,486 homes, damage 5,844 more, and submerged 268,770 hectares (664,000 acres) of crops. Twelve people died and total economic losses in the province reached ¥1.837 billion (US$267 million). The impacts are considered the worst from a typhoon in the province since Typhoon Haikui in 2012.

In neighboring Hunan province, approximately 4.9 million people were affected, of whom 9,114 were rendered homeless. Hundreds of homes suffered varying degrees of damage while 85 collapsed. Flooding primarily affected eastern counties near the Anhui–Hunan border.

Unusually heavy rains persisted as far north as Liaoning Province;up to 288 mm (11.3 in) fell across the Liaodong Peninsula. Hourly accumulations peaked at 50 to 70 mm (2.0 to 2.8 in) and minor street flooding occurred in many areas.

Two tornadoes touched down in Xuzhou.

=== Shandong Province ===
The province of Shandong suffered the greatest impacts of the storm. Between August 17 and 21, province-wide precipitation averaged 143.1 mm (5.63 in)—equivalent to 22.42 billion m^{3} of water. Accumulations peaked at 511 mm (20.1 in) in Tuanmen, Tai'an. Twenty-three reservoirs exceeded flood stage, and inundated towns across 81 counties. Approximately 616,300 hectares (1.5 million acres) of agricultural land was flooded. At least 24 people were killed, 13,317 homes were destroyed, 11,043 homes were damaged, and economic losses in the province reached ¥21.51 billion (US$3.13 billion). Of the 5.18 million people affected, 173,500 people required evacuation. Flooding and landslides damaged or destroyed 17.4 km (10.8 mi) of roads, 3.6 km (2.2 mi) of power lines, and 2.4 km (1.5 mi) of water piping. Additionally, a bridge along the Qingyin Expressway collapsed.

Some of the greatest damage took place in and around Shouguang where 254.7 mm (10.03 in) of rain fell, far exceeding forecasts. Upstream on the Mi River, which runs through the city, rainfall reached 241.6 mm (9.51 in) and caused significant flooding. Water levels at the Yeyuan, Qinshuiya, and Heihushan reservoirs rose dangerously high, prompting officials to release excess water to avoid collapse. The resulting increase downstream exacerbated the flooding in Shouguang and neighboring villages. Water levels along the river reached their highest point since 1974, and water flow in the city reached 2,420 m^{3} per second—the greatest rate on record. The city is regarded as the nation's greatest producer of vegetables and agriculture suffered tremendous losses; 160,00 hectares (395,000 acres) of agricultural land were inundated and 200,000 greenhouses sustained damage. The floods killed 13 people, left 4 people missing, and destroyed 10,635 homes.

The entirety of the small town of Tianjiatun in Tai'an required evacuation; three people died in the town.

== Effects elsewhere ==
On August 16, heavy rains impacted much of Japan's Ryukyu Islands. The heaviest precipitation fell across the Sakishima Islands, with Iriomote-jima observing 120 mm (4.7 in) in a one-hour span on this day.

== Aftermath ==
As flooding overtook large swaths of Weifang, local fire and police departments were rapidly deployed to evacuate over 14,000 people trapped in submerged communities. More than 400 rescue personnel equipped with 40 large-scale rescue vehicles from the municipal government were deployed.

The government of Shandong provided ¥700 million (US$102 million) worth of relief material. Ten disaster centers were established to coordinate relief efforts, provide medical care, and reduce the risk of post-storm diseases. Shouguang opened a refugee center to provide displaced persons with food and shelter. The city of Shouguang established a charity which received ¥42.96 million (US$6.24 million) by August 24. A further ¥78 million (US$11.3 million) was disseminated by the Municipal Finance Bureau. The Civil Affairs Bureau distributed 28,600 beds, 3,200 tents, 2,080 mattresses, 59,733 towels, 50,000 boxes of water, 20,000 boxes of instant noodles, and 4,068 flashlights. The Bureau also allocated ¥28 million (US$4.07 million) in funding. Through August 23, insurance companies received 50,286 claims worth ¥809 million (US$118 million).

=== Retirement ===
Due to the extensive damage and high death toll in East China, the name Rumbia was officially retired during the 51st annual session of the ESCAP/WMO Typhoon Committee in February 2019 and will never be used again for another typhoon name. In July 2020, the Typhoon Committee subsequently chose Pulasan as its replacement name, and it was first used during 2024.

== See also ==
- Weather of 2018
- Tropical cyclones in 2018
- Tropical Storm Bilis (2006)
- Typhoon Fitow (2013)
