= Mi River =

River in Hunan, China

Coordinates: 27°09′48″N 112°52′06″E

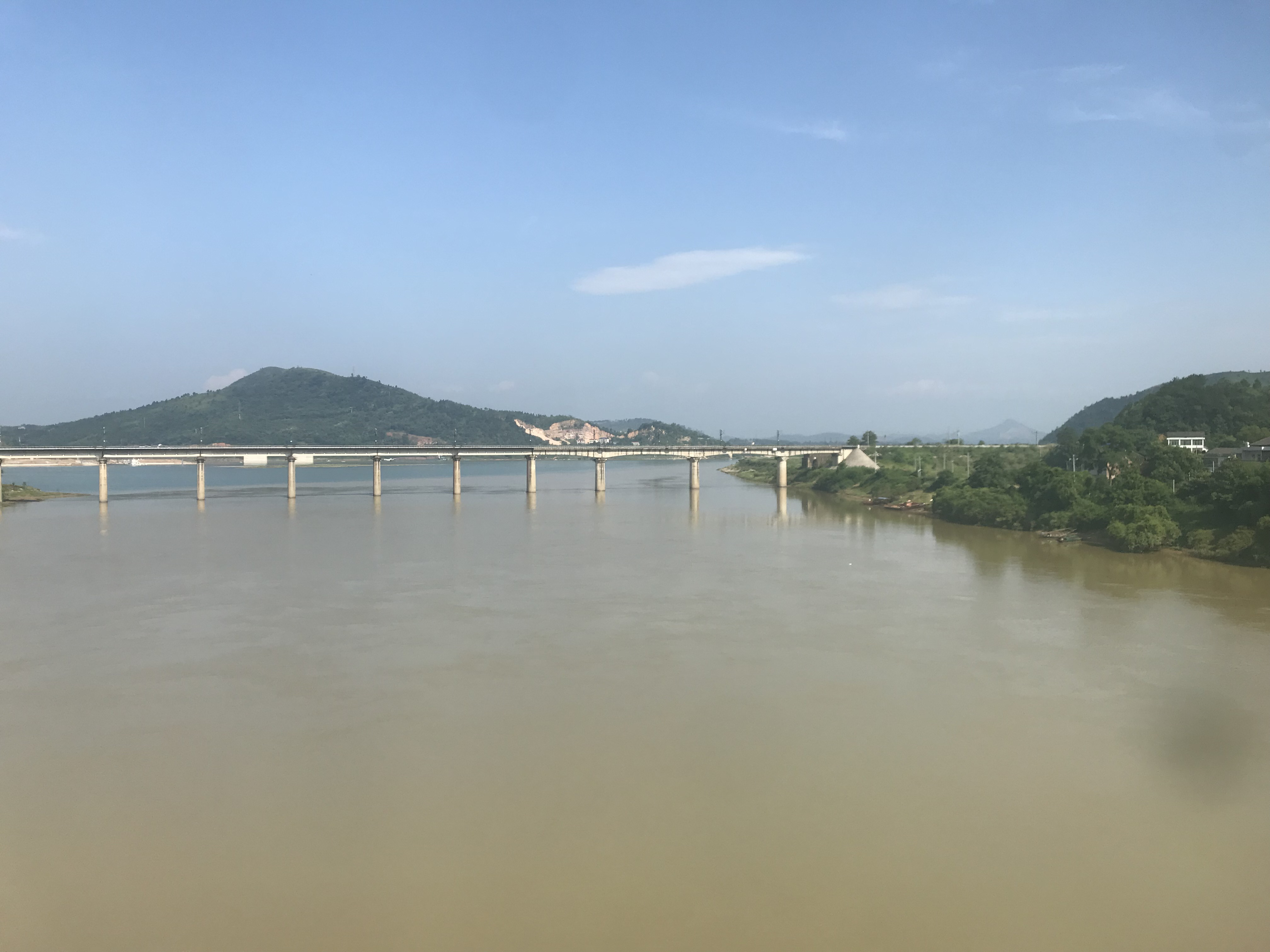
Beijing–Guangzhou Railway Mi River Bridge

The Mi River (Chinese: 洣水) is one of three largest tributaries of the Xiang River and a right-bank tributary in the middle reaches of the Xiang in Hunan, China. The river rises in Tianxin Village (Chinese: 田心村) of Xiacun Township, Yanling County. Its main stream runs generally southeast to northwest through Yanling, Chaling, You and Hengdong counties, and it joins the Xiang in Xintang Town of Hengdong. The Mi River has a length of 296 kilometres (184 mi); its drainage basin covers an area of 10,305 square kilometres (3,979 sq mi).
