= Ceyuan, Yanling =

Ceyuan Township 策源乡
- Township
- Location in Hunan
- Coordinates: 26°21′20″N 113°54′08″E
- Country: People's Republic of China
- Province: Hunan
- Prefecture-level city: Zhuzhou
- County: Yanling

Area
  - Total: 179.63 km^{2} (69.36 sq mi)

Population
  - Total: 5,900
  - Density: 33/km^{2} (85/sq mi)
- Time zone: UTC+8 (China Standard)
- Postal code: 412509
- Area code: 0733

Ceyuan Township (simplified Chinese: 策源乡; traditional Chinese: 策源鄉; pinyin: Cèyuán Xiāng) is a rural township in Yanling County, Zhuzhou City, Hunan Province, People's Republic of China. It is divided into 11 villages: Shangdong Village, Liangqiao Village, Xiaping Village, Pinghu Village, Rongtang Village, Changxing Village, Daokeng Village, Zhuyuan Village, Dongling Village, Huangcao Village, and Lishuzhou Village.
