= Chuanxing, Yanling =

Chuanxing Township 船形乡
- Township
- Location in Hunan
- Coordinates: 26°18′08″N 113°39′57″E
- Country: People's Republic of China
- Province: Hunan
- Prefecture-level city: Zhuzhou
- County: Yanling

Area
  - Total: 101 km^{2} (39 sq mi)

Population
  - Total: 8,530
  - Density: 84.5/km^{2} (219/sq mi)
- Time zone: UTC+8 (China Standard)
- Area code: 0733

Chuanxing Township (simplified Chinese: 船形乡; traditional Chinese: 船形鄉; pinyin: Chuánxíng Xiāng) is a rural township in Yanling County, Hunan Province, People's Republic of China.

== Cityscape ==
The township is divided into 10 villages, which includes the following areas: Donghe Village, Huangdong Village, Tongmu Village, Xinsheng Village, Gaolu Village, Chuanxing Village, Yantan Village, Nanping Village, Shuilong Village, and Changwang Village.
