= Mishui =

Mishui 洣水镇
- town
- Location within Hunan
- Coordinates: 26°21′31″N 112°57′18″E
- Country: People's Republic of China
- Province: Hunan
- Prefecture: Hengyang
- County: Hengdong County
- Divisions: 20 villages and 8 communities

Area
  - Total: 52 km^{2} (20 sq mi)

Population (2017)
  - Total: 150,000
  - Density: 2,900/km^{2} (7,500/sq mi)
- Time zone: UTC+8 (China Standard)
- Area code: 0734
- Languages: Standard Chinese and Hengzhou dialect

Mishui Town (Chinese: 洣水镇; pinyin: Mǐshuǐ Zhèn) is a town and the seat of Hengdong County in Hunan, China. The town has an area of 131.8 km^{2} (50.9 sq mi) with a household population of 150,000 (as of 2017). The town of Mishui has 20 villages and 8 communities under its jurisdiction, and its seat is Yinbin Community (迎宾社区).

== History ==
The town of Mishui was organized through the merger of Chengguan Town, Tazhuang Township and Zhenzhu Township and named after the Mishui River on November 18, 2015.

=== Chengguan Town ===
Chengguan Town (Chinese: 城关镇) was reorganized in 1984 from the former Chenguan Commune, founded in 1966, and is now the southwestern part of Mishui Town. The town had an area of 30.9 km^{2} (11.9 sq mi) with a population of 55,556 as of the 2010 census. It was divided into 6 communities of Binjiang (滨江), Dutou (渡头), Jiantou (枧头), Xingdong (兴东), Yangshan (杨山) and Yingbin (迎宾), and 9 villages: Dadian (大甸), Dutouping (渡头坪), Jin'e (金鹅), Jinhua (金花), Jinyan (金堰), Queqiao (鹤桥), Xinhe (新鹤), Yuetang (月塘) and Yuexiao (岳宵).

=== Tazhuang Township ===
Tazhuang Township (Chinese: 踏庄乡) was established in 1956 and is now the southeastern part of the present Mishui Town. It had an area of 44 km^{2} (17 sq mi) with a population of 13,959 as of the 2010 census. It was divided into 16 villages: Datang (大塘村), Datuo (大托村), Fenglin (丰林村), Fenglong (丰垅村), Huayuan (花园村), Jingming (荆茗村), Langshan (朗山村), Minggang (茗岗村), Mulin (木林村), Shanglang (上朗村), Tazhuang (踏庄村), Tongxiao (桐宵村), Xiannan (仙南村), Zhengping (正坪村), Zhonglang (中朗村) and Zhongsen (中森村).

=== Zhenzhu Township ===
Zhenzhu Township (Chinese: 珍珠乡) was a part of Bailian Township in 1950, founded in 1956, and is now the northern part of Mishui Town. The township had an area of 57 km^{2} (22 sq mi) with a population of 16,906 as of the 2010 census. It was divided into 18 villages: Beichong (北冲村), Dajiang (大江村), Danantang (大南塘村), Dawu (大乌村), Futong (富塘村), Huangzitang (黄梓堂村), Lingyan (岭岩村), Shanchong (山冲村), Shijiang (石江村), Shitou (石头村), Shuangfeng (双凤村), Tongsheng (同升村), Xiaojiang (小江村), Xiaoshan (小山村), Xiaowu (小乌村), Xinkai (新开村), Yinxiang (印湘村) and Zhenzhu (珍珠村).

== Geography ==
The town of Mishui is located in the northern middle part of Hengdong County. It is bordered by the towns of Bailian and Yangqiao to the northeast, Ganxi Town to the southeast, Wuji Town to the south and southwest, Xintang Town to the northwest, Shiwan Town to the north. It covers an area of 131.8 km^{2} (50.9 sq mi).

== Subdivisions ==
Through the amalgamation of village-level divisions in 2016, the number of its divisions was reduced to 28 from 49.

8 communities

- Binjiang Community (滨江社区)
- Jiaxing Community (嘉兴社区)
- Jinyan Community (金堰社区)
- Mijiang Community (洣江社区)
- Xingdong Community (兴东社区)
- Yangshan Community (杨山社区)
- Yanwan Community (堰湾社区)
- Yingbin community (迎宾社区)

20 villages

- Beichong Village (北冲村)
- Caixia Village (采霞村)
- Dadian Village (大甸村)
- Dashan Village (大山村)
- Datang Village (大塘村)
- Datuo Village (大托村)
- Daxing Village (大兴村)
- Hexiang Village (鹤祥村)
- Jin'e Village (金峨村)
- Jingming Village (荆茗村)
- Jinhua Village (金花村)
- Langshan Village (朗山村)
- Nantang Village (南塘村)
- Shijiang Village (石江村)
- Tazhuang Village (踏庄村)
- Xianlin Village (仙林村)
- Xiannan Village (仙楠村)
- Yuexiao Village (岳霄村)
- Zhenzhu Village (珍珠村)
- Zhuangyuan Village (状元村)

== Notable people ==
- Wang Guangze (Chinese: 王光泽; 1903 – 1934), the commander (师长) of the Red Army's Qiandong Independent Division (黔东独立师). Wang was captured by the enemy on November 28, 1934, in Xiushan County, Sichuan (modern Chongqing). Chiang Kai-shek ordered Liu Xiang to execute him and Wang was secretly killed in Youyang County on December 21, 1934, when he was 31 years old. Since 1949, the government of Youyang County has been searching for his remains. In April 1982, his remains were found in Yanjiapo (邬家坡), two kilometers from the seat of Longtan Town (龙潭镇). The iron shovel was still on the cheekbones of the martyr. In November 1983, the government of Youyang County moved Wang's remains to the Martyrs' Cemetery of Longtan Town to build a monument to commemorate forever.
