= Longxi, Yanling =

Longxi Township 垄溪乡
- Township
- Location in Hunan
- Coordinates: 26°26′28″N 113°47′49″E
- Country: People's Republic of China
- Province: Hunan
- Prefecture-level city: Zhuzhou
- County: Yanling County

Area
  - Total: 141.6 km^{2} (54.7 sq mi)

Population
  - Total: 8,300
  - Density: 59/km^{2} (150/sq mi)
- Time zone: UTC+8 (China Standard)
- Postal code: 412504
- Area code: 0733

Longxi Township (simplified Chinese: 垄溪乡; traditional Chinese: 壟溪鄉; pinyin: Lǒngxī Xiāng) is a rural township in Yanling County, Hunan Province, People's Republic of China.

== Cityscape ==
The township is divided into 14 villages, which include the following areas: Caoxi Village, Jiangzhou Village, Sankoulong Village, Xikeng Village, Tulei Village, Chabei Village, Nan'an Village, Gutang Village, Niutang Village, Xianping Village, Chalong Village, Qiutian Village, Banxi Village, and Caiping Village.
