= Shuikou, Yanling =

Shuikou Town 水口镇
- Town
- Location in Hunan
- Coordinates: 26°19′34″N 113°48′17″E
- Country: People's Republic of China
- Province: Hunan
- Prefecture-level city: Zhuzhou
- County: Yanling

Area
  - Total: 106.24 km^{2} (41.02 sq mi)

Population
  - Total: 2,300
  - Density: 22/km^{2} (56/sq mi)
- Time zone: UTC+8 (China Standard)
- Area code: 0733

Shuikou Town (simplified Chinese: 水口镇; traditional Chinese: 水口鎮; pinyin: Shuǐkǒu Zhèn) is an urban town in Yanling County, Hunan Province, People's Republic of China.

== Cityscape ==
The town is divided into 20 villages and one community, which the following areas: Shuikou Community, Taoling Village, Muwan Village, Guancangxia Village, Shuikou Village, Shuixi Village, Shuinan Village, Liankeng Village, Zha Village, Banqiao Village, Zaoshu Village, Datang Village, Xilong Village, Yanchi Village, Shuangshan Village, Taoyuan Village, Xiaowan Village, Ziyuan Village, Baiyuan Village, Jiang Village, and Xialong Village.
