= Mengjin, Luoyang =

Mengjin 孟津区 Mengtsing
- District
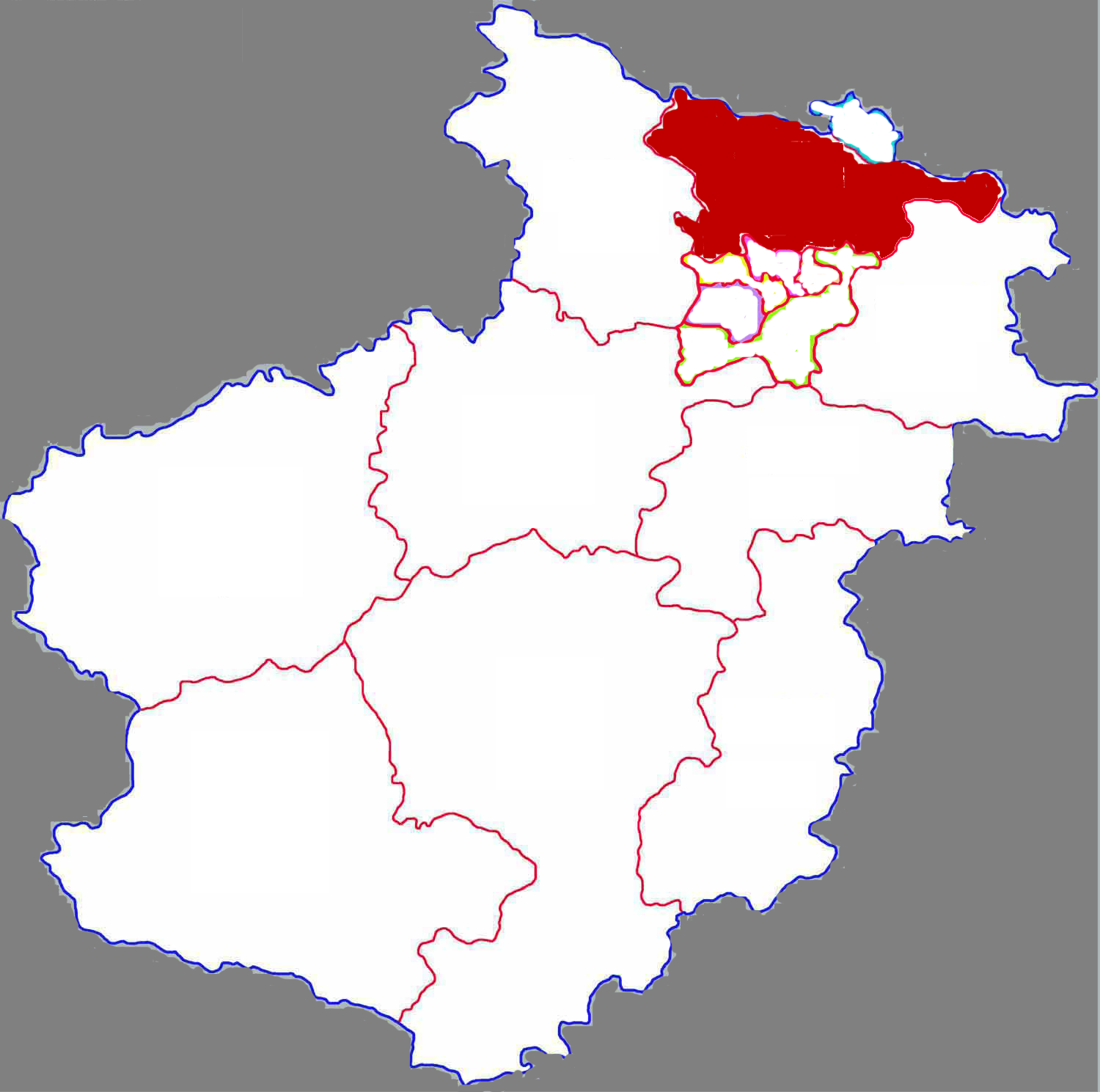
- Mengjin in Luoyang

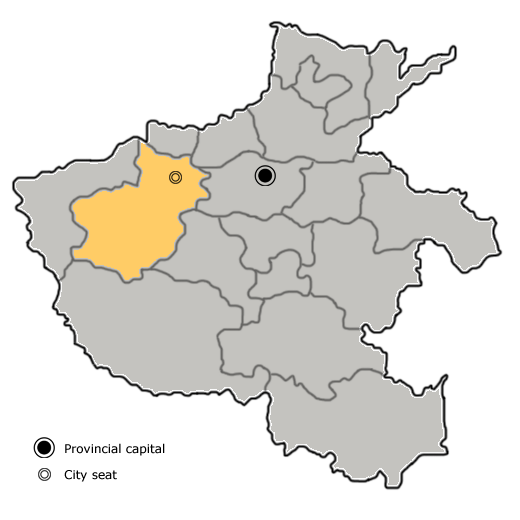
- Luoyang in Henan
- Coordinates: 34°49′30″N 112°26′42″E
- Country: People's Republic of China
- Province: Henan
- Prefecture-level city: Luoyang

Area
  - Total: 759 km^{2} (293 sq mi)

Population (2020)
  - Total: 486,300
  - Density: 641/km^{2} (1,660/sq mi)
- Time zone: UTC+8 (China Standard)
- Postal code: 471100

Mengjin, Luoyang
- Traditional Chinese: 孟津區
- Simplified Chinese: 孟津区
- Hanyu Pinyin: Mèngjīn Qū
Transcriptions
Standard Mandarin
- Hanyu Pinyin: Mèngjīn Qū
Yue: Cantonese
- Jyutping: maang^{6}zeon^{1} jyun^{2}

Mengjin District is a district in Luoyang City, in the northwest of Henan province, China, located to the north of Luoyang's urban districts.

== History ==
Mengjin began its life as an ancient ferry crossing for the Yellow River. According to legend, King Wu of Zhou crossed the Yellow River at this location, after forming an alliance with the other nobles, leading to the theory that the original name was actually (盟津; Méngjīn; 'ferry crossing of the alliance') rather than 孟津; Mèngjīn. According to this theory, it was only in later times that the character 盟 was mistakenly replaced by 孟. The ferry crossing was an important strategic location during times of war.

In Chapter 6 of Romance of the Three Kingdoms, Cao Cao explains that part of his strategy in engaging Dong Zhuo's forces was for Yuan Shao's forces to take control of Mengjin (see: Battle of Xingyang).

As of 2012, Mengjin is divided to 10 towns. In March 2021, Jili District was merged into Mengjin District.

Towns

- Chengguan (城关镇)
- Huimeng (会盟镇)
- Pingle (平乐镇)
- Songzhuang (送庄镇)
- Baihe (白鹤镇)
- Chaoyang (朝阳镇)
- Xiaolangdi (小浪底镇)
- Matun (麻屯镇)
- Hengshui (横水镇)
- Changdai (常袋镇)

== Climate ==
Climate data for Mengjin, elevation 329 m (1,079 ft), (1991–2020 normals, extremes 1981–2010)
Month	Jan	Feb	Mar	Apr	May	Jun	Jul	Aug	Sep	Oct	Nov	Dec	Year
Record high °C (°F)	19.6 (67.3)	24.5 (76.1)	32.3 (90.1)	38.7 (101.7)	40.2 (104.4)	40.7 (105.3)	41.1 (106.0)	38.6 (101.5)	37.6 (99.7)	34.2 (93.6)	27.0 (80.6)	22.8 (73.0)	41.1 (106.0)
Mean daily maximum °C (°F)	5.4 (41.7)	9.1 (48.4)	15.0 (59.0)	21.9 (71.4)	27.1 (80.8)	31.3 (88.3)	31.3 (88.3)	29.7 (85.5)	25.8 (78.4)	20.5 (68.9)	13.5 (56.3)	7.5 (45.5)	19.8 (67.7)
Daily mean °C (°F)	0.5 (32.9)	3.8 (38.8)	9.3 (48.7)	15.8 (60.4)	21.2 (70.2)	25.6 (78.1)	26.6 (79.9)	25.1 (77.2)	20.9 (69.6)	15.4 (59.7)	8.5 (47.3)	2.5 (36.5)	14.6 (58.3)
Mean daily minimum °C (°F)	−3.1 (26.4)	−0.2 (31.6)	4.8 (40.6)	10.6 (51.1)	15.9 (60.6)	20.6 (69.1)	22.8 (73.0)	21.7 (71.1)	17.0 (62.6)	11.3 (52.3)	4.6 (40.3)	−1.2 (29.8)	10.4 (50.7)
Record low °C (°F)	−14.1 (6.6)	−13.1 (8.4)	−8.2 (17.2)	−0.5 (31.1)	5.4 (41.7)	12.3 (54.1)	15.4 (59.7)	11.7 (53.1)	6.5 (43.7)	−1.5 (29.3)	−11.7 (10.9)	−13.5 (7.7)	−14.1 (6.6)
Average precipitation mm (inches)	9.3 (0.37)	12.5 (0.49)	23.0 (0.91)	40.3 (1.59)	53.4 (2.10)	68.6 (2.70)	123.4 (4.86)	100.4 (3.95)	88.9 (3.50)	43.3 (1.70)	27.0 (1.06)	6.3 (0.25)	596.4 (23.48)
Average precipitation days (≥ 0.1 mm)	3.8	4.3	5.7	6.1	7.3	7.8	10.9	10.3	9.2	6.9	5.5	3.2	81
Average snowy days	4.3	4.0	1.9	0.2	0	0	0	0	0	0	1.5	3.0	14.9
Average relative humidity (%)	53	54	54	56	57	59	75	78	72	64	60	53	61
Mean monthly sunshine hours	142.3	144.6	182.1	213.0	227.9	206.8	177.3	177.7	159.9	162.3	153.3	158.4	2,105.6
Percentage possible sunshine	45	46	49	54	52	48	41	43	43	47	50	52	48
Source: China Meteorological Administration

== See also ==
- Battle of Muye
