= Shidu, Yanling =

Shidu Town 十都镇
- Town
- Location in Hunan
- Coordinates: 26°33′04″N 113°56′08″E
- Country: People's Republic of China
- Province: Hunan
- Prefecture-level city: Zhuzhou
- County: Yanling

Area
  - Total: 246 km^{2} (95 sq mi)

Population
  - Total: 12,200
  - Density: 49.6/km^{2} (128/sq mi)
- Time zone: UTC+8 (China Standard)
- Area code: 0733

Shidu Town (simplified Chinese: 十都镇; traditional Chinese: 十都鎮; pinyin: Shídū Zhèn) is an urban town in Yanling County, Hunan Province, People's Republic of China.

== Cityscape ==
The town is divided into 20 villages and one community, which includes the following areas: Xizhengjie Community, Liangtian Village, Chexi Village, Xiaodong Village, Yangqi Village, Hongnan Village, Nanliu Village, Qingshigang Village, Pikeng Village, Mihua Village, Shenlong Village, Xiaojiang Village, Longkou Village, Macai Village, Meichong Village, Huangfengzhai Village, Dilong Village, Huangshang Village, Daping Village, Shangjing Village, and Gualiao Village.
