= 石州 =

石州 may refer to:

- Iwami Province, abbreviated name was following Sekishū (石州), province of Japan located in what is today the western part of Shimane Prefecture
- Shizhou (in modern Shanxi) (石州), a former subdivision in modern Lüliang, Shanxi, China
- Shizhou (in modern Shaanxi) (石州), a former prefecture in modern Yulin, Shaanxi, China
- Shizhou (in modern Guangxi) (石州), a former subdivision in modern Wuzhou and Yulin, Guangxi, China
- Shizhou (in modern Sichuan) (石州), a former subdivision in modern Dazhou, Sichuan, China
