= Pingle, Sichuan =

Pingle 平乐 Pinglezhen
- Town
- 平乐镇
- Location within China
- Coordinates: 30°20′38.6″N 103°20′04.0″E
- Country: China
- Province: Sichuan
- Prefecture-level city: Chengdu
- County-level city: Qionglai City
- Time zone: UTC+8 (China Standard)
- Area code: +28

Pingle (simplified Chinese: 平乐; traditional Chinese: 平樂; pinyin: Pínglè; Wade–Giles: P'ing-lo Town) is a town in Qionglai City, Sichuan Province, China. It is located 15 kilometres (9.3 mi) south-southwest of Qionglai City and sits in the west of the province at the western edge of the Sichuan Basin and in the foothills of the Qionglai Mountains.

== See also ==
- List of township-level divisions of Sichuan
