= Anren County =

Anren County 安仁县 Anjen
- County
- Location in Hunan
- Coordinates: 26°42′29″N 113°16′12″E
- Country: People's Republic of China
- Province: Hunan
- Prefecture-level city: Chenzhou
- Time zone: UTC+8 (China Standard)
- Postal code: 4236XX
- Website: www.anren.gov.cn

Anren County (simplified Chinese: 安仁县; traditional Chinese: 安仁縣; pinyin: Ānrén Xiàn) is a county in Hunan Province, China. It is under the administration of Chenzhou prefecture-level City.

Located on the southeast of the province, it is the northernmost county-level division of Chenzhou City. The county is bordered to the north by Hengdong and You Counties, to the east by Chaling and Yanling Counties, to the south and southwest by Yongxing County, and to the west by Leiyang City and Hengnan County. Anren County covers an area of 1,462.1 km^{2} (564.5 sq mi), and as of 2015, it had a registered population of 465,500 and a resident population of 390,500. The county has five towns and eight townships under its jurisdiction, and the county seat is Yonglejiang.

== Administrative divisions ==
5 towns

- Yonglejiang (永乐江镇)
- Longhai (龙海镇)
- Lingguan (灵官镇)
- Ping'an (安平镇)
- Jinzixian (金紫仙镇)

8 townships

- Longshi (龙市乡)
- Chengping (承坪乡)
- Dukou (渡口乡)
- Zhushan (竹山乡)
- Yangji (洋际乡)
- Huawang (华王乡)
- Pailou (牌楼乡)
- Pingbei (平背乡)

== Climate ==
Climate data for Anren, elevation 102 m (335 ft), (1991–2020 normals, extremes 1981–2010)
Month	Jan	Feb	Mar	Apr	May	Jun	Jul	Aug	Sep	Oct	Nov	Dec	Year
Record high °C (°F)	26.6 (79.9)	32.4 (90.3)	36.3 (97.3)	36.0 (96.8)	36.5 (97.7)	37.9 (100.2)	40.8 (105.4)	41.7 (107.1)	39.1 (102.4)	36.3 (97.3)	33.5 (92.3)	26.0 (78.8)	41.7 (107.1)
Mean daily maximum °C (°F)	9.8 (49.6)	12.9 (55.2)	17.0 (62.6)	23.8 (74.8)	28.3 (82.9)	31.4 (88.5)	34.9 (94.8)	33.8 (92.8)	30.0 (86.0)	24.8 (76.6)	18.9 (66.0)	12.7 (54.9)	23.2 (73.7)
Daily mean °C (°F)	6.0 (42.8)	8.7 (47.7)	12.5 (54.5)	18.7 (65.7)	23.3 (73.9)	26.8 (80.2)	29.7 (85.5)	28.6 (83.5)	24.8 (76.6)	19.5 (67.1)	13.7 (56.7)	8.1 (46.6)	18.4 (65.1)
Mean daily minimum °C (°F)	3.5 (38.3)	5.8 (42.4)	9.6 (49.3)	15.3 (59.5)	19.8 (67.6)	23.5 (74.3)	25.9 (78.6)	25.1 (77.2)	21.3 (70.3)	15.9 (60.6)	10.1 (50.2)	4.9 (40.8)	15.1 (59.1)
Record low °C (°F)	−5.1 (22.8)	−3.8 (25.2)	−3.0 (26.6)	2.9 (37.2)	9.2 (48.6)	13.4 (56.1)	18.5 (65.3)	18.3 (64.9)	13.0 (55.4)	2.2 (36.0)	−1.3 (29.7)	−11.9 (10.6)	−11.9 (10.6)
Average precipitation mm (inches)	87.9 (3.46)	95.2 (3.75)	180.3 (7.10)	171.1 (6.74)	192.4 (7.57)	238.3 (9.38)	138.5 (5.45)	151.4 (5.96)	67.3 (2.65)	67.5 (2.66)	87.4 (3.44)	65.2 (2.57)	1,542.5 (60.73)
Average precipitation days (≥ 0.1 mm)	15.8	15.0	19.3	17.6	16.9	14.5	10.9	11.9	9.5	9.8	11.8	11.5	164.5
Average snowy days	3.1	1.6	0.3	0	0	0	0	0	0	0	0.1	0.8	5.9
Average relative humidity (%)	83	82	83	80	79	79	71	76	78	77	79	79	79
Mean monthly sunshine hours	54.2	58.8	64.3	97.8	128.9	142.9	236.8	198.1	149.8	128.2	108.9	93.8	1,462.5
Percentage possible sunshine	16	18	17	25	31	35	56	49	41	36	34	29	32
Source: China Meteorological Administration
