= Pingle, Yanling =

Pingle Township
- Township

Chinese transcription(s)
  - Simplified: 平乐乡
  - Traditional: 平樂鄉
  - Pinyin: Pingle Xiang
- Location in China
- Coordinates: 26°10′13″N 113°49′36″E
- Country: People's Republic of China
- Province: Hunan
- City: Zhuzhou
- County: Yanling County

Area
  - Total: 82 km^{2} (32 sq mi)

Population
  - Total: 15,300
  - Density: 190/km^{2} (480/sq mi)
- Time zone: UTC+8 (China Standard)
- Area code: 0733

Pingle (Chinese: 平乐乡; pinyin: Pínglè Xiāng) is a historic township located in the southern east of Yanling County, Hunan, China. The township had 8 villages under its jurisdiction with an area of 82 km^{2} (32 sq mi). As of the 2010 census, the township had a population of 2,323. Its administrative centre was at Maoping Village (茅坪).

== History ==
As a historic division of Yanling, Pingle was originally a part of Dingzhi Township (定治乡) in 1949, the 7th county-controlled district in 1950, Pingle Township (平乐乡) in 1956 and Xingfu Commune (幸福公社) in 1958. Derived from a part of Xingfu Commune, Pingle Commune was created in 1961. it was reorganized as a township in 1984. On November 20, 2015, Pingle, Zhongcun and Longzha three townships were merged to create the new Zhongcun Yao Ethnic Township.

== Cityscape ==
The township is divided into 8 villages: Maoping Village, Lefu Village, Mianying Village, Dongping Village, Dongzi Village, Qingshan Village, Jingshan Village, and Xinshan Village.
