= Shizhou, Yanling =

Shizhou Township
- Township

Chinese transcription(s)
  - Simplified: 石洲乡
  - Traditional: 石洲鄉
  - Pinyin: Shizhou Xiang
- Location in China
- Coordinates: 26°28′18″N 113°54′37″E
- Country: People's Republic of China
- Province: Hunan
- City: Zhuzhou
- County: Yanling County

Area
  - Total: 101 km^{2} (39 sq mi)

Population
  - Total: 5,300
  - Density: 52/km^{2} (140/sq mi)
- Time zone: UTC+8 (China Standard)
- Postal code: 412503
- Area code: 0733

Shizhou (Chinese: 石洲乡; pinyin: Shízhōu Xiāng) is a historic township located in the middle north of Yanling County, Hunan, China; it was merged to Miandu Town in November 2015. The township had 7 villages under its jurisdiction with an area of 79.76 km^{2} (30.80 sq mi), as of 2010 census, it had a population of 5,244, its administrative centre was at Shizhouli (石洲里) of Shiba Village (石坝村).

== Subdivisions ==
The township is divided into seven villages, which includes the following areas: Shiba Village, Qingshi Village, Ankeng Village, Shuangjiang Village, Dayuan Village, Ma'ao Village, and Gaoche Village.
