= Pingle Cutting =

Nature reserve in Cambridgeshire, England

Coordinates: 52.417°N 0.070°W

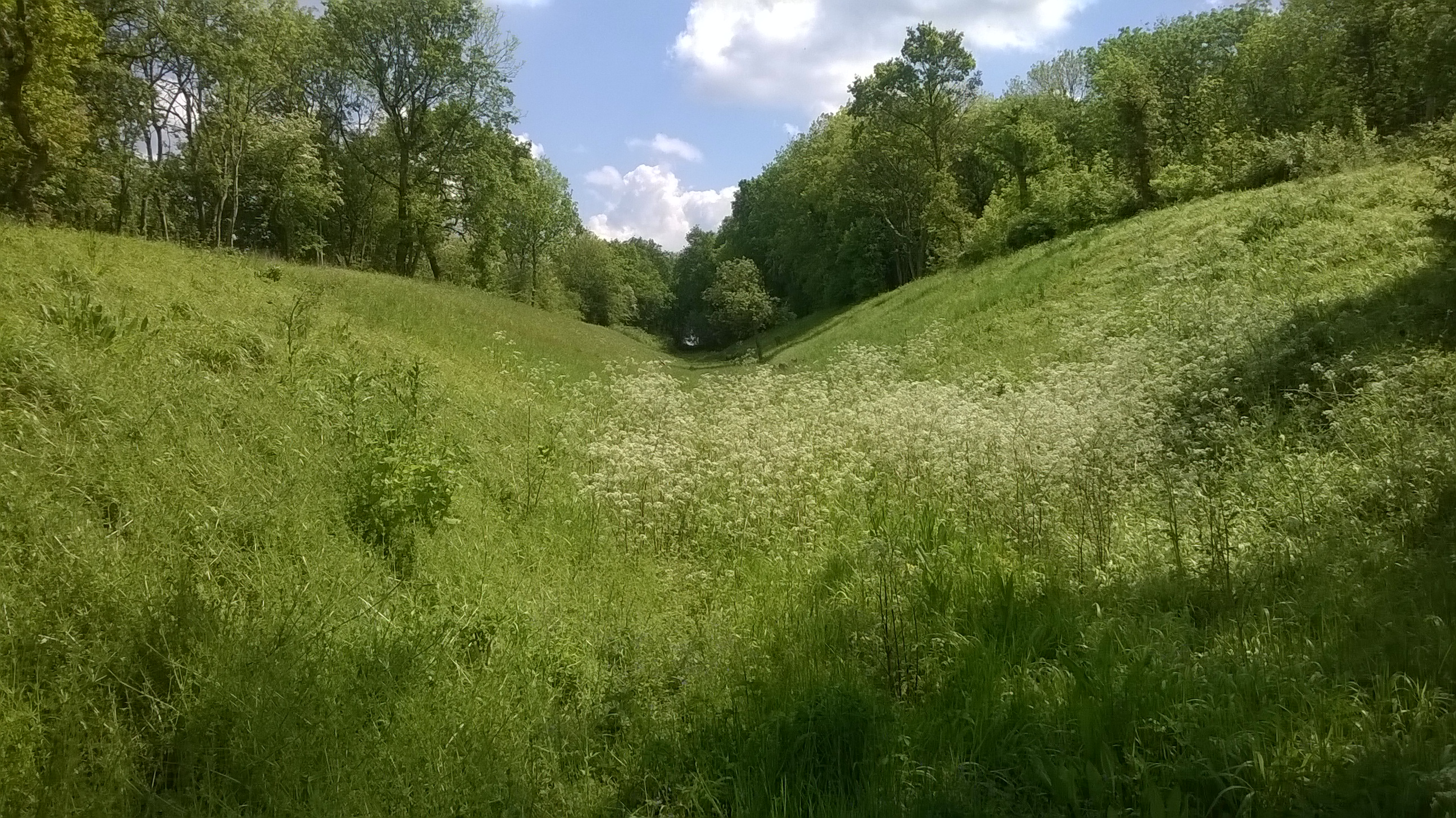
- Interactive map of Pingle Cutting
- Type: Nature reserve
- Location: Warboys, Cambridgeshire
- OS grid: TL 313 816
- Area: 1.0 hectare (2.5 acres)
- Manager: Wildlife Trust for Bedfordshire, Cambridgeshire and Northamptonshire

Pingle Cutting is a 1.0-hectare (2.5-acre) nature reserve located north of Warboys in Cambridgeshire. It is managed by the Wildlife Trust for Bedfordshire, Cambridgeshire and Northamptonshire.

This former railway cutting features grassland with species such as ox-eye daisy, salad burnet, wild carrot and hairy violet. There is also woodland with forest plants including bluebells and dog's mercury. Over 50 bird species and 300 moth species have been recorded at the reserve.

Access is available from Fenside Road.
