= Xiacun, Yanling =

Xiacun Township 下村乡
- Township
- Location in Hunan
- Coordinates: 26°13′35″N 113°53′53″E
- Country: People's Republic of China
- Province: Hunan
- Prefecture-level city: Zhuzhou
- County: Yanling

Area
  - Total: 130 km^{2} (50 sq mi)

Population
  - Total: 42,000
  - Density: 320/km^{2} (840/sq mi)
- Time zone: UTC+8 (China Standard)
- Area code: 0733

Xiacun Township (simplified Chinese: 下村乡; traditional Chinese: 下村鄉; pinyin: Xiàcūn Xiāng) is a rural township in Yanling County, Hunan Province, People's Republic of China.

== Cityscape ==
The township is divided into 14 villages, which includes the following areas: Tongle Village, Nihu Village, Changyuan Village, Tianxin Village, Aotou Village, Dongkeng Village, Xiyuan Village, Yunli Village, Jiufeng Village, Pingkeng Village, Changxi Village, Dahengxi Village, Henggang Village, and Qingsong Village.
