= Gaohu, Hunan =

Gaohu 高湖镇
- Town
- Location in Hunan
- Coordinates: 26°57′40″N 113°10′28″E
- Country: People's Republic of China
- Province: Hunan
- Prefecture-level city: Hengyang
- County: Hengdong
- Elevation: 73 m (240 ft)
- Time zone: UTC+8 (China Standard)
- Area code: 0734

Gaohu (Chinese: 高湖; pinyin: Gāohú; lit. 'high lake') is a town in Hengdong County in southeastern Hunan province, China, located 26 kilometres (16 mi) southeast of the county seat and served by G72 Quanzhou–Nanning Expressway. As of 2018, it has one residential community (社区) and 10 villages under its administration.

== See also ==
- List of township-level divisions of Hunan
