= Miandu, Yanling =

Miandu Town 沔渡镇
- Town
- Location in Hunan
- Coordinates: 26°34′44″N 113°51′37″E
- Country: People's Republic of China
- Province: Hunan
- Prefecture-level city: Zhuzhou
- County: Yanling

Area
  - Total: 125 km^{2} (48 sq mi)

Population
  - Total: 14,500
  - Density: 116/km^{2} (300/sq mi)
- Time zone: UTC+8 (China Standard)
- Area code: 0733

Miandu Town (simplified Chinese: 沔渡镇; traditional Chinese: 沔渡鎮; pinyin: Miǎndù Zhèn) is an urban town in Yanling County, Hunan Province, People's Republic of China.

== Cityscape ==
The town is divided into one village and 16 communities, which includes the following areas: Mianduxu Community, Xiaoli Village, Shangguan Village, Huayuan Village, Pankeng Village, Xiaguan Village, Cangbei Village, Ruikou Village, Shanglao Village, Xiaoyang Village, Changjiang Village, Shitou Village, Longxiang Village, Suzhou Village, Dongli Village, Shiqiao Village, and Dajiang Village.
