= Pingle, Henan =

Pingle 平乐镇
- Town
- Location in Henan
- Coordinates: 34°44′51″N 112°35′22″E
- Country: People's Republic of China
- Province: Henan
- Prefecture-level city: Luoyang
- County: Mengjin County
- Time zone: UTC+8 (China Standard)

Pingle (Chinese: 平乐; pinyin: Pínglè) is a town in Mengjin County, Luoyang, Henan. As of 2020, it administers Pingle Residential Community and the following 19 villages:

- Dongzhao Village (东赵村)
- Xiangzhuang Village (象庄村)
- You Village (尤村)
- Zhaiquan Village (翟泉村)
- Jin Village (金村)
- Shangtun Village (上屯村)
- Zhucang Village (朱仓村)
- Tianhuangling Village (天皇岭村)
- Zhangjia'ao Village (张家凹村)
- Dingjiagou Village (丁家沟村)
- Shanggu Village (上古村)
- Zhangpan Village (张盘村)
- Xinzhuang Village (新庄村)
- Houying Village (后营村)
- Taicang Village (太仓村)
- Ma Village (马村)
- Liupo Village (刘坡村)
- Donglümiao Village (东吕庙村)
- Zhouli Village (妯娌村)
