= Production brigade =

Former rural administrative division of the People's Republic of China

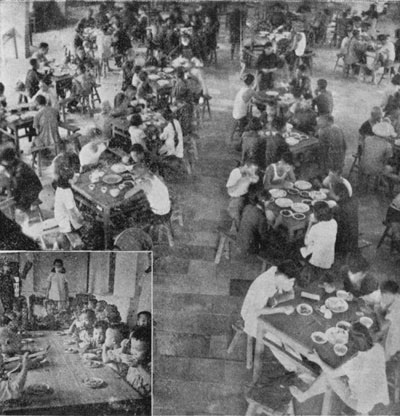
Canteen where people could eat for free in 1958.

A production brigade (simplified Chinese: 生产大队; traditional Chinese: 生產大隊; pinyin: shēngchǎn dàduì) was formerly the basic accounting and farm production unit in the people's commune system of the People's Republic of China.

In late 1960, the unit of accounting through which labor and income were allocated was devolved from the people's commune to the production brigade. In many cases, these brigades corresponded to the high level agricultural producers' cooperatives that had preceded the people's communes.

In 1962, the unit of account was further devolved to the production team, which remained the unit of account until agricultural was totally decollectivized between 1979 and 1982.

== See also ==
- Work unit
- Administrative divisions of the People's Republic of China
