= Hengdong County =

Hengdong County 衡东县
- County
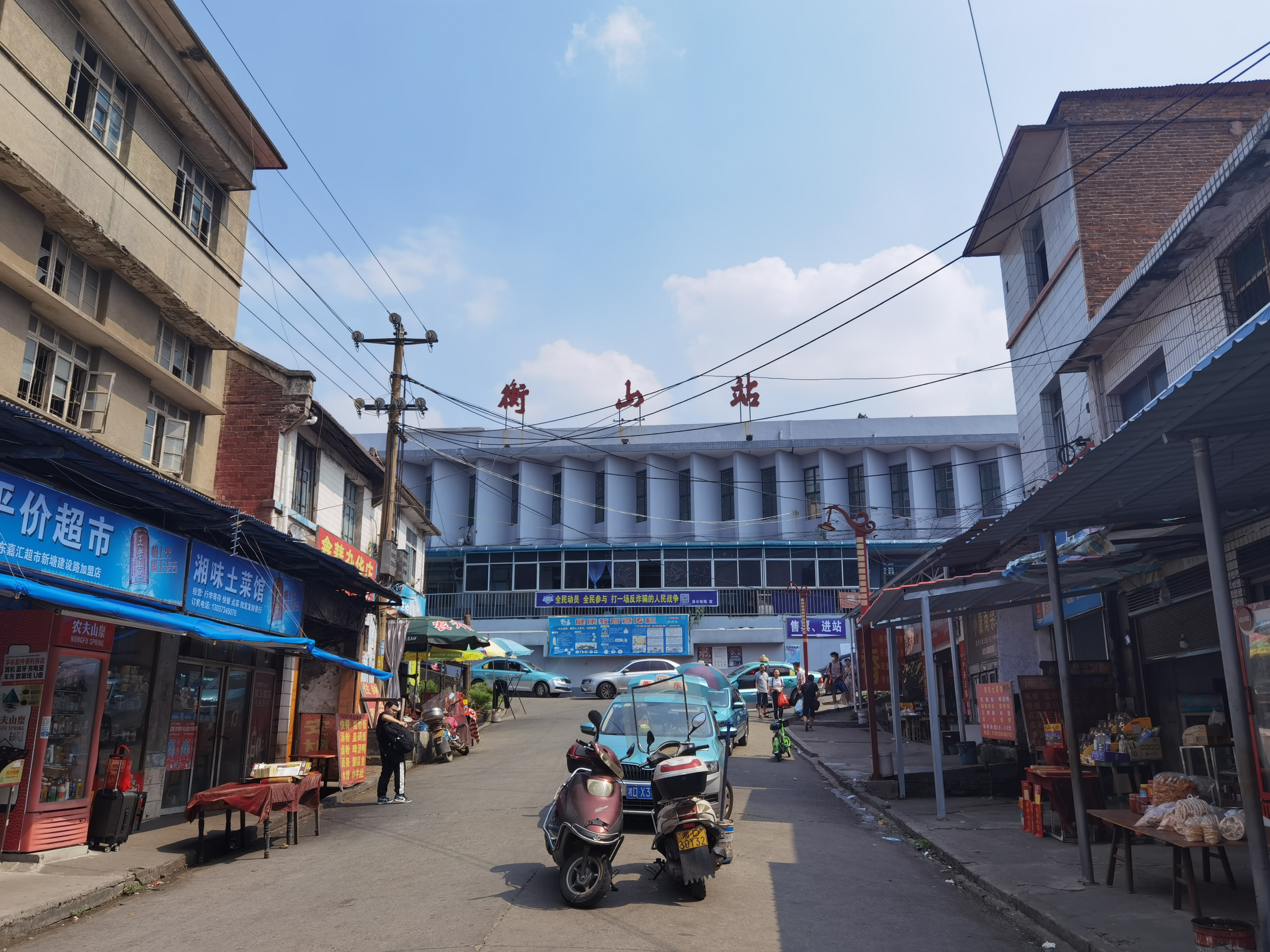

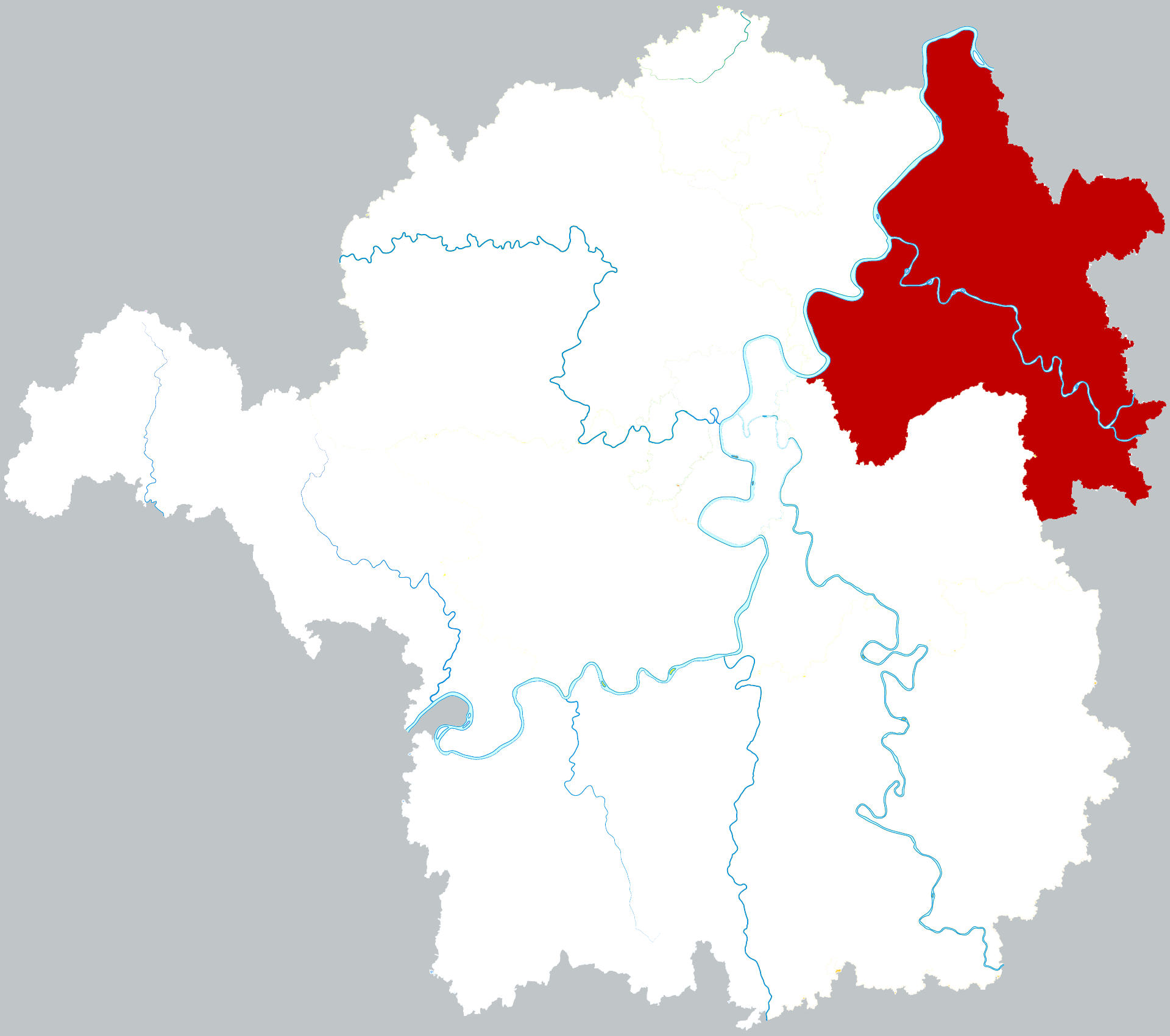
- Location in Hengyang

- Location in Hunan
- Coordinates: 27°04′52″N 112°57′11″E
- Country: People's Republic of China
- Province: Hunan
- Prefecture-level city: Hengyang
- Seat: Mishui
- Time zone: UTC+8 (China Standard)

Hengdong County (simplified Chinese: 衡东县; traditional Chinese: 衡東縣; pinyin: Héngdōng Xiàn; lit. 'east of Mount Heng') is a county located in the east of Hengyang prefecture-level city, Hunan province, China. It was established from the eastern part of Hengshan County in 1966 and named after the east of Mount Heng. The county has an area of 1,926.78 km^{2} (743.93 sq mi) with a population of 746,300 (as of 2015). The county of Hengdong has two townships and 15 towns under its jurisdiction. Its seat is Mishui Town (洣水镇).

== Geography ==
Hengdong County is located in the south of Hunan Province, between the Hengyang Basin and the Yanqi Basin in the middle reaches of the Xiang River. It borders You County to the east, the counties of Anren and Hengnan to the south, counties of Hengshan and Hengnan to the west, and counties of Xiangtan and Zhuzhou to the north.

Hengdong is named after its location that the county is located in the east of Mount Heng. The county covers an area of 1,926.78 km^{2} (743.93 sq mi), the longest distance is 72.9 km (45.3 mi) from north to south and 53.6 km (33.3 mi) from west to east.

== Fossils ==
Fossils of a of Planocrania hendongensis, a species of the type genus of Planocraniidae, a family of terrestrial eusuchian crocodylomorphs. Colloquially known as the "Hoved Crocodiles" was found in the city and described in 1984.

== Subdivision ==
15 towns

- Bailian (白莲镇)
- Caoshi (草市镇)
- Dapu (大浦镇)
- Ganxi (甘溪镇)
- Gaohu (高湖镇)
- Mishui (洣水镇)
- Pengyuan (蓬源镇)
- Rongheng (荣桓镇)
- Sanzhang (三樟镇)
- Shiwan (石湾镇)
- Wuji (吴集镇)
- Xialiu (霞流镇)
- Xintang (新塘镇)
- Yanglin (杨林镇)
- Yangqiao (杨桥镇)

2 townships

- Nanwan (南湾乡)
- Shitan (石滩乡)

== Climate ==
Climate data for Hengdong, elevation 70 m (230 ft), (1991–2020 normals, extremes 1981–2010)
Month	Jan	Feb	Mar	Apr	May	Jun	Jul	Aug	Sep	Oct	Nov	Dec	Year
Record high °C (°F)	27.9 (82.2)	31.3 (88.3)	35.9 (96.6)	36.4 (97.5)	37.5 (99.5)	38.0 (100.4)	40.6 (105.1)	41.2 (106.2)	39.0 (102.2)	35.7 (96.3)	33.3 (91.9)	25.4 (77.7)	41.2 (106.2)
Mean daily maximum °C (°F)	9.4 (48.9)	12.4 (54.3)	16.6 (61.9)	23.4 (74.1)	28.0 (82.4)	31.2 (88.2)	34.7 (94.5)	33.8 (92.8)	29.8 (85.6)	24.4 (75.9)	18.6 (65.5)	12.4 (54.3)	22.9 (73.2)
Daily mean °C (°F)	5.9 (42.6)	8.4 (47.1)	12.3 (54.1)	18.5 (65.3)	23.2 (73.8)	26.8 (80.2)	30 (86)	28.8 (83.8)	24.8 (76.6)	19.5 (67.1)	13.7 (56.7)	8.1 (46.6)	18.3 (65.0)
Mean daily minimum °C (°F)	3.5 (38.3)	5.7 (42.3)	9.3 (48.7)	15.0 (59.0)	19.6 (67.3)	23.5 (74.3)	26.3 (79.3)	25.3 (77.5)	21.4 (70.5)	16.1 (61.0)	10.4 (50.7)	5.1 (41.2)	15.1 (59.2)
Record low °C (°F)	−4.9 (23.2)	−5.9 (21.4)	−0.9 (30.4)	2.9 (37.2)	10.1 (50.2)	13.0 (55.4)	18.2 (64.8)	18.2 (64.8)	13.0 (55.4)	4.2 (39.6)	−1.1 (30.0)	−7.6 (18.3)	−7.6 (18.3)
Average precipitation mm (inches)	78.0 (3.07)	88.9 (3.50)	168.7 (6.64)	169.6 (6.68)	199.5 (7.85)	181.3 (7.14)	125.9 (4.96)	113.9 (4.48)	64.1 (2.52)	62.1 (2.44)	85.6 (3.37)	59.7 (2.35)	1,397.3 (55)
Average precipitation days (≥ 0.1 mm)	14.8	14.9	19.4	17.3	16.9	14.9	10.3	10.9	8.7	9.5	10.8	11.0	159.4
Average snowy days	3.7	2.2	0.6	0	0	0	0	0	0	0	0	1	7.5
Average relative humidity (%)	82	82	84	81	80	80	72	76	78	77	80	79	79
Mean monthly sunshine hours	58.5	58.9	69.7	102.5	135.5	143.7	235.6	203.4	153.0	130.4	112.4	97.4	1,501
Percentage possible sunshine	18	18	19	27	32	35	56	51	42	37	35	30	33
Source: China Meteorological Administration

== Culture ==
=== Dialect ===
The county speaks a New Xiang dialect closely related to that of Hengyang.
