= Xiayang, Yanling =

Xiayang Town 霞阳镇
- Town
- Location in Hunan
- Coordinates: 26°29′26″N 113°46′15″E
- Country: People's Republic of China
- Province: Hunan
- Prefecture-level city: Zhuzhou
- County: Yanling

Area
  - Total: 118.45 km^{2} (45.73 sq mi)

Population
  - Total: 50,000
  - Density: 420/km^{2} (1,100/sq mi)
- Time zone: UTC+8 (China Standard)
- Area code: 0733

Xiayang Town (simplified Chinese: 霞阳镇; traditional Chinese: 霞陽鎮; pinyin: Xiáyáng Zhèn) is an urban town and the seat of Yanling County in Hunan, China.

== Cityscape ==
The town is divided into 22 villages and four communities, which includes the following areas: Dongqu Community, Nanqu Community, Xiqu Community, Beiqu Community, Shanlong Village, Shiziba Village, Yanjia Village, Zhongtuan Village, Chuntang Village, Tanglong Village, Jili Village, Hecangyuan Village, Huangshalong Village, Kanping Village, Caoping Village, Hantian Village, Shiyu Village, Madao Village, Shucai Village, Yancheng Village, Wulipai Village, Shenkeng Village, Shigu Village, Shichao Village, Longfu Village, and Pingxing Village.
