= Luyuan, Yanling =

Luyuan Town 鹿原镇
- Town
- Location in Hunan
- Coordinates: 26°26′05″N 113°39′34″E
- Country: People's Republic of China
- Province: Hunan
- Prefecture-level city: Zhuzhou
- County: Yanling

Area
  - Total: 143 km^{2} (55 sq mi)

Population
  - Total: 25,000
  - Density: 170/km^{2} (450/sq mi)
- Time zone: UTC+8 (China Standard)
- Area code: 0733

Luyuan Town (simplified Chinese: 鹿原镇; traditional Chinese: 鹿原鎮; pinyin: Lùyuán Zhèn) is an urban town in Yanling County, Hunan Province, People's Republic of China.

== Cityscape ==
The town is divided into 22 villages and one community, which includes the following areas: Luyuan Community, Longhu Village, Tianxing Village, Aotou Village, Hutian Village, Mixi Village, Jingshan Village, Jinhua Village, Cuiqun Village, Yujiang Village, Xitang Village, Tangwang Village, Shuidong Village, Yanling Village, Nanchong Village, Liushan Village, Xinping Village, Xiatang Village, Xinghuo Village, Pengxi Village, Jiangkou Village, Tiantang Village, and Tianlong Village.
