= Yanling County, Hunan =

Yanling County 炎陵县
- County
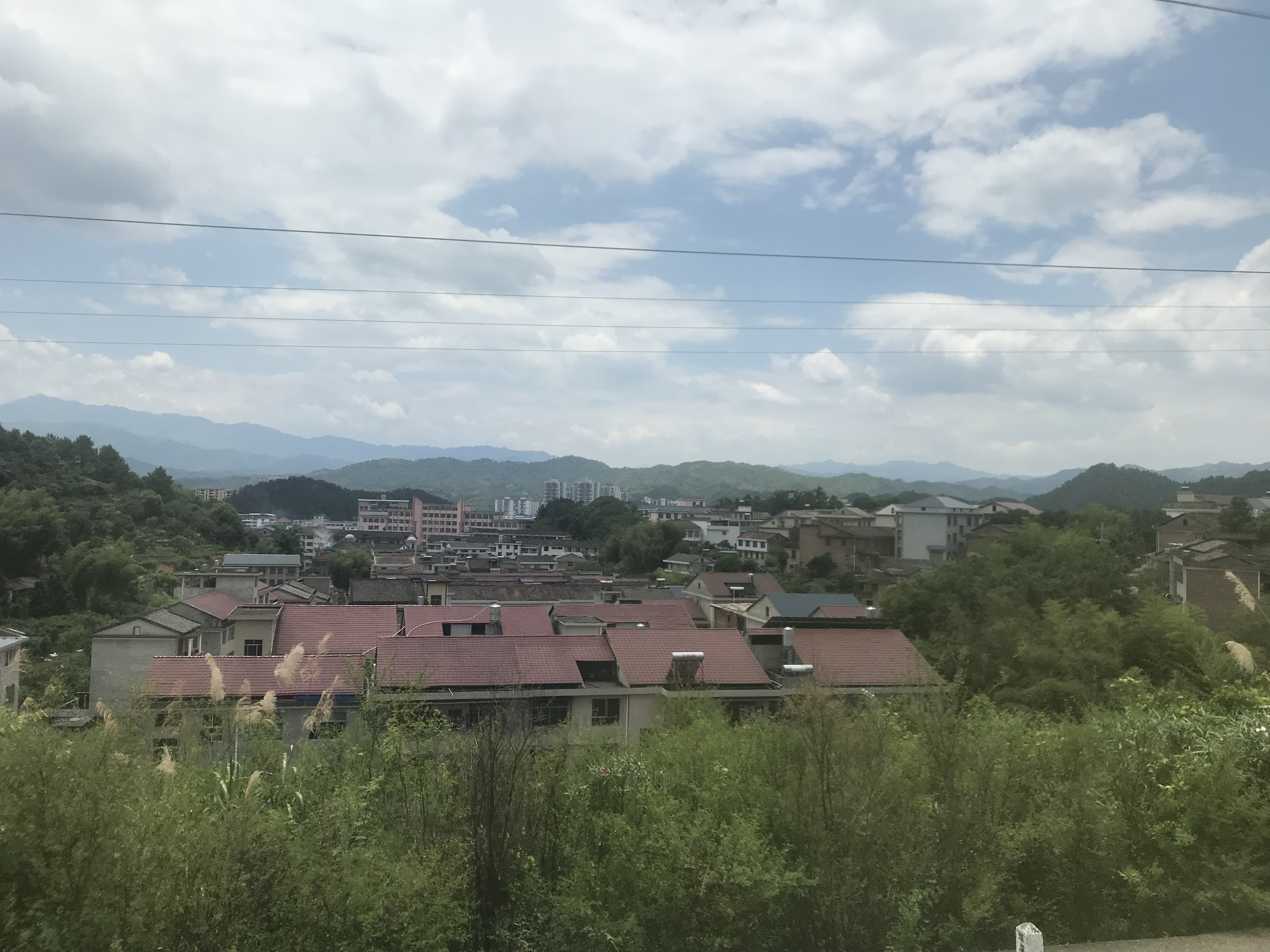

- Location in Hunan
- Coordinates: 26°29′24″N 113°46′22″E
- Country: People's Republic of China
- Province: Hunan
- Prefecture-level city: Zhuzhou

Area
  - Total: 2,030 km^{2} (780 sq mi)

Population (2020)
  - Total: 160,274
  - Density: 79.0/km^{2} (204/sq mi)
- Time zone: UTC+8 (China Standard)

Yanling County (simplified Chinese: 炎陵县; traditional Chinese: 炎陵縣; pinyin: Yánlíng Xiàn; lit. 'the place of Yan Emperor's tomb') is a county in Hunan Province, China, under the administration of Zhuzhou City. Located on the south eastern margin of the province, the county is bordered to the north by Chaling County, to the west by Anren, Yongxing Counties and Zixing City, to the south by Guidong County, and to the east by Suichuan County and Jinggangshan City of Jiangxi. Yanling County covers 2,030 km^{2} (780 sq mi). As of 2020, it had a population of 160,274, which is 41,797 fewer than 10 years ago. The county has 5 towns and 5 townships under its jurisdiction, and the county seat is at Xiayang (霞阳镇).

== tourist attractions ==
=== The Mausoleum of Emperor Yandi ===
The Mausoleum of Emperor Yan is the resting place of the Yan Emperor Shennong, the ancestor of the Chinese nation. It enjoys the reputation of "the first mausoleum in China" and is a national key cultural relic protection unit and a national scenic spot.

== Subdivisions ==
Name	Hanzi	Population (2005)	Area (km^{2})	Note
Xiayang	霞阳镇	50,000	118.45	
Miandu	沔渡镇	14,500	125	
Shidu	十都镇	12,200	246	
Shuikou	水口镇	2,300	106.24	
Sanhe	三河镇	18,900	111.07	
Luyuan	鹿原镇	25,000	143	
Cangxi	苍溪乡	8,300	141.6	
Shizhou	石洲乡	5,300	101	
Ceyuan	策源乡	5,900	179.63	
Xiacun	下村乡	42,000	130	
Zhongcun	中村乡	7,627	108	
Pingle	平乐乡	15,300	82	
Chuanxing	船形乡	8,530	101	
Dongfeng	东风乡	8,900	53.66	

Yanling County currently has 5 towns and 5 townships.

5 towns

- Luyuan (鹿原镇)
- Miandu (沔渡镇)
- Shidu (十都镇)
- Shuikou (水口镇)
- Xiayang (霞阳镇)

4 townships

- Ceyuan (策源乡)
- Chuanxing (船形乡)
- Longxi (垄溪乡)
- Xiacun (下村乡)

1 ethnic township

- Yao Zhongcun (中村瑶族乡)

== Climate ==
Climate data for Yanling, elevation 269 m (883 ft), (1991–2020 normals, extremes 1981–2010)
Month	Jan	Feb	Mar	Apr	May	Jun	Jul	Aug	Sep	Oct	Nov	Dec	Year
Record high °C (°F)	27.6 (81.7)	31.7 (89.1)	35.6 (96.1)	36.2 (97.2)	36.8 (98.2)	37.4 (99.3)	41.6 (106.9)	39.7 (103.5)	38.5 (101.3)	36.1 (97.0)	33.8 (92.8)	28.9 (84.0)	41.6 (106.9)
Mean daily maximum °C (°F)	11.0 (51.8)	14.1 (57.4)	17.8 (64.0)	24.4 (75.9)	28.6 (83.5)	31.5 (88.7)	34.4 (93.9)	33.2 (91.8)	29.9 (85.8)	25.2 (77.4)	19.8 (67.6)	13.9 (57.0)	23.6 (74.6)
Daily mean °C (°F)	6.4 (43.5)	8.9 (48.0)	12.5 (54.5)	18.4 (65.1)	22.7 (72.9)	25.9 (78.6)	27.8 (82.0)	26.8 (80.2)	23.9 (75.0)	19.0 (66.2)	13.5 (56.3)	8.1 (46.6)	17.8 (64.1)
Mean daily minimum °C (°F)	3.6 (38.5)	5.7 (42.3)	9.3 (48.7)	14.4 (57.9)	18.7 (65.7)	22.1 (71.8)	23.3 (73.9)	23.0 (73.4)	20.1 (68.2)	14.9 (58.8)	9.5 (49.1)	4.5 (40.1)	14.1 (57.4)
Record low °C (°F)	−5.2 (22.6)	−4.5 (23.9)	−3.6 (25.5)	1.5 (34.7)	8.3 (46.9)	12.6 (54.7)	16.8 (62.2)	16.3 (61.3)	10.8 (51.4)	1.2 (34.2)	−2.6 (27.3)	−7.6 (18.3)	−7.6 (18.3)
Average precipitation mm (inches)	78.3 (3.08)	91.5 (3.60)	170.8 (6.72)	171.2 (6.74)	191.2 (7.53)	237.9 (9.37)	173.3 (6.82)	193.2 (7.61)	95.3 (3.75)	62.9 (2.48)	79.9 (3.15)	61.4 (2.42)	1,606.9 (63.27)
Average precipitation days (≥ 0.1 mm)	15.6	15.0	19.8	18.1	18.2	17.1	15.0	16.6	11.9	9.5	11.3	11.6	179.7
Average snowy days	2.5	1.3	0.3	0	0	0	0	0	0	0	0	0.7	4.8
Average relative humidity (%)	83	83	84	82	81	81	77	81	81	79	81	81	81
Mean monthly sunshine hours	65.9	72.2	76.2	112.2	139.4	150.9	226.4	192.1	153.2	144.7	123.3	108.9	1,565.4
Percentage possible sunshine	20	23	20	29	33	37	54	48	42	41	38	34	35
Source: China Meteorological Administration
